= List of restaurants in Paris =

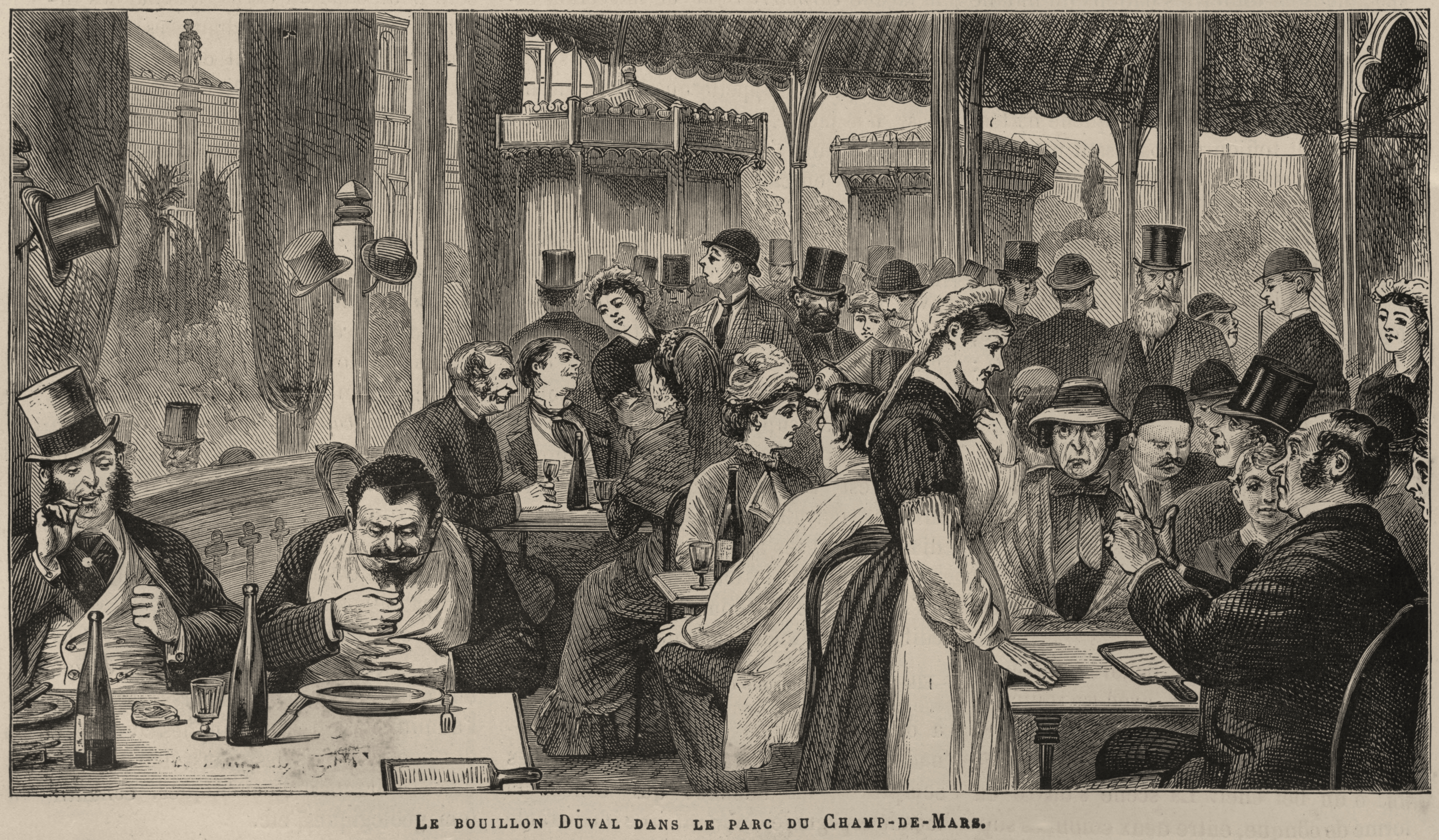
The restaurant Duval was one of the many eateries at the 1878 Paris World Fair.

This is a list of notable restaurants in Paris, France. It includes a listing of notable cafés.

== Restaurants ==
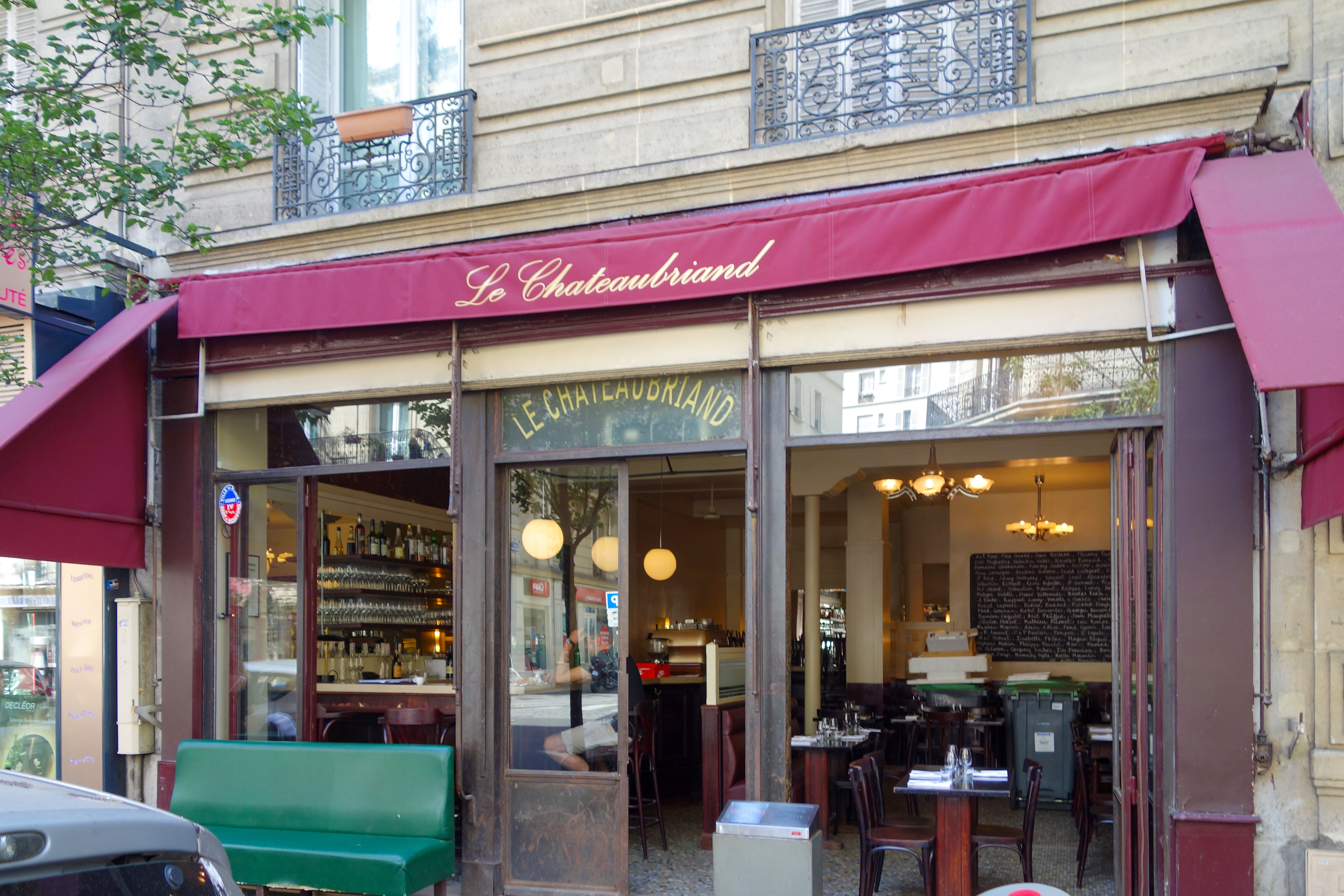
Le Chateaubriand

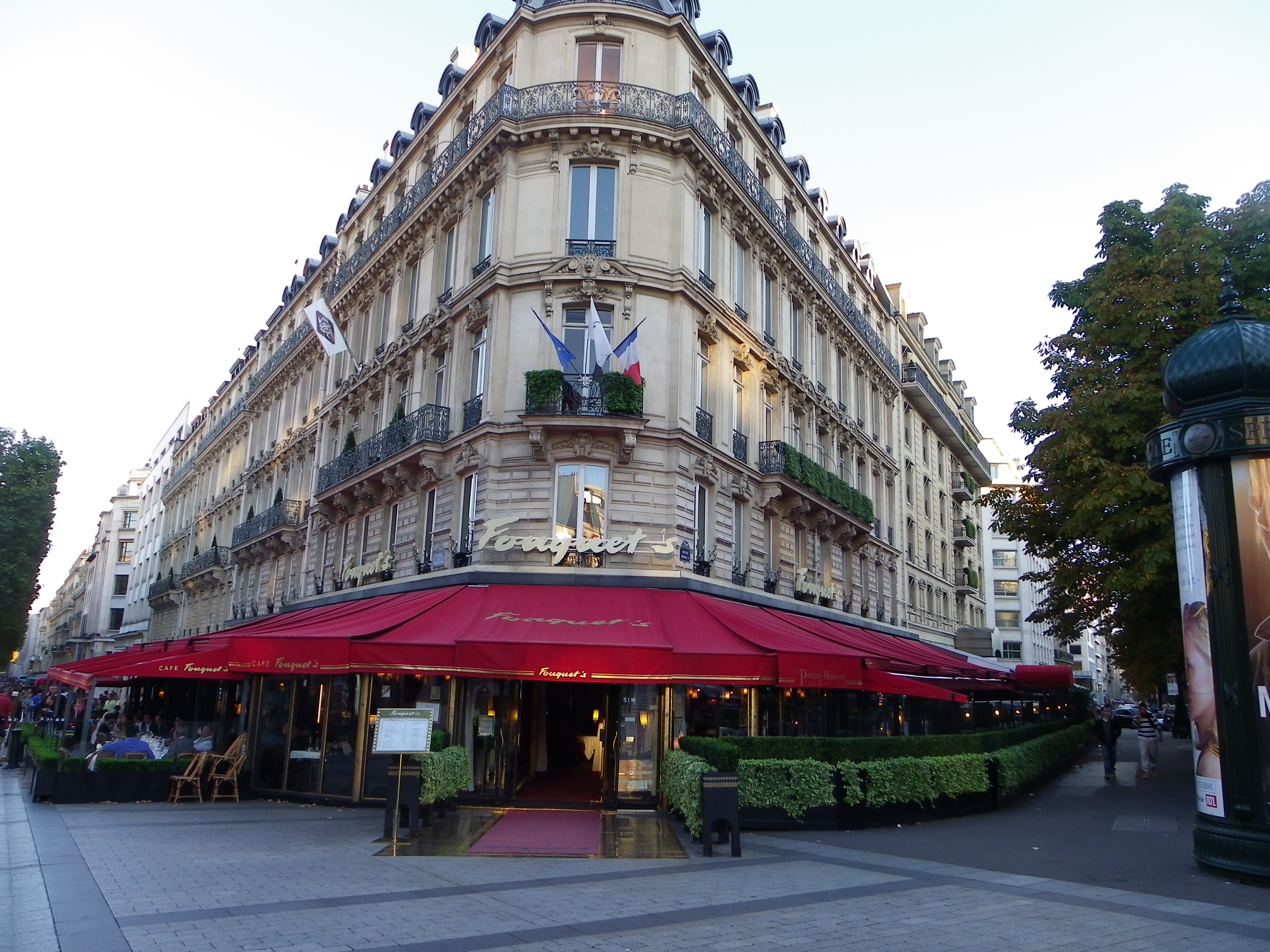
Both sides of Fouquet's, Avenue des Champs-Élysées turning left and Avenue George V turning right

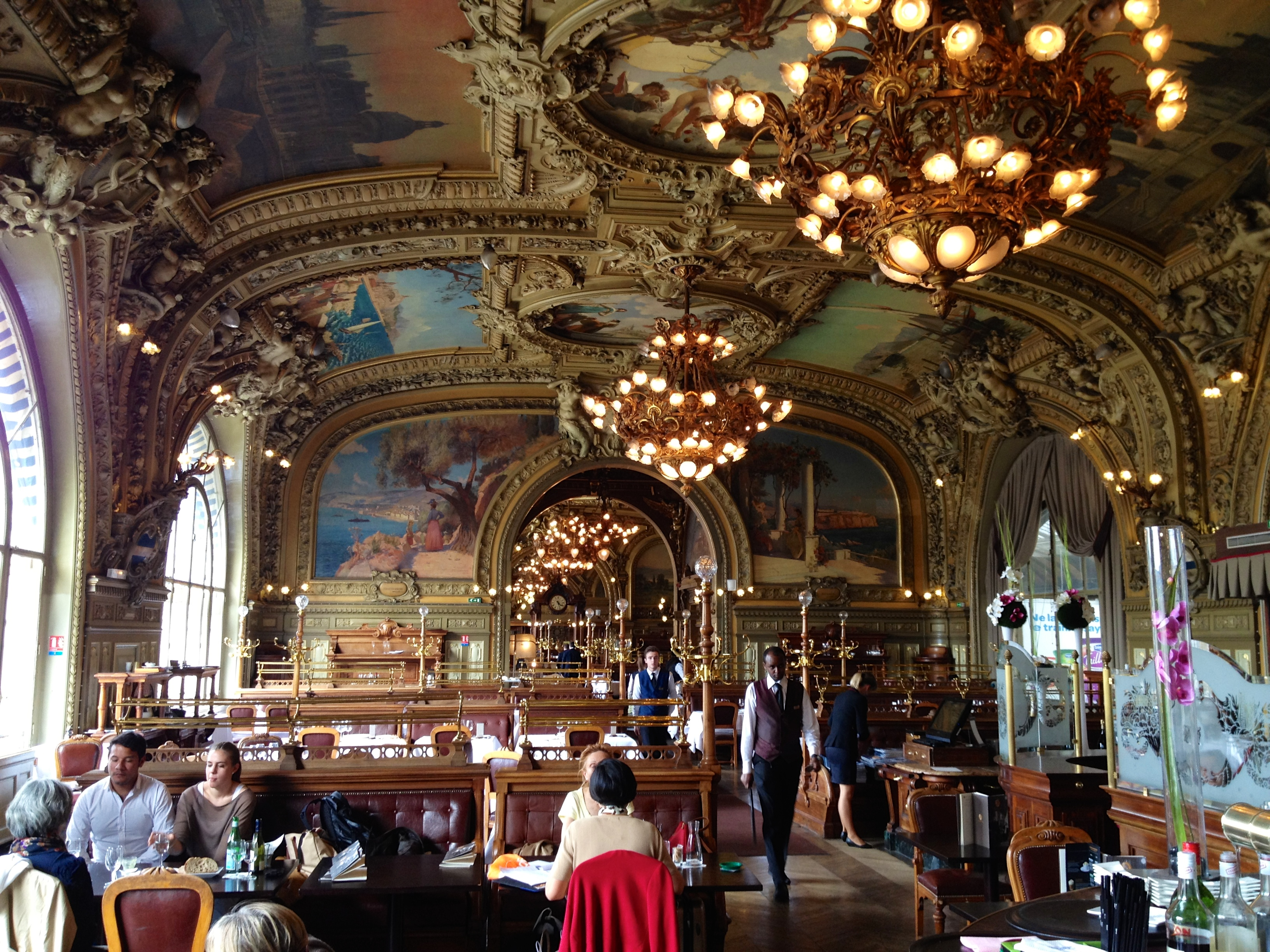
The dining room at Le Train Bleu

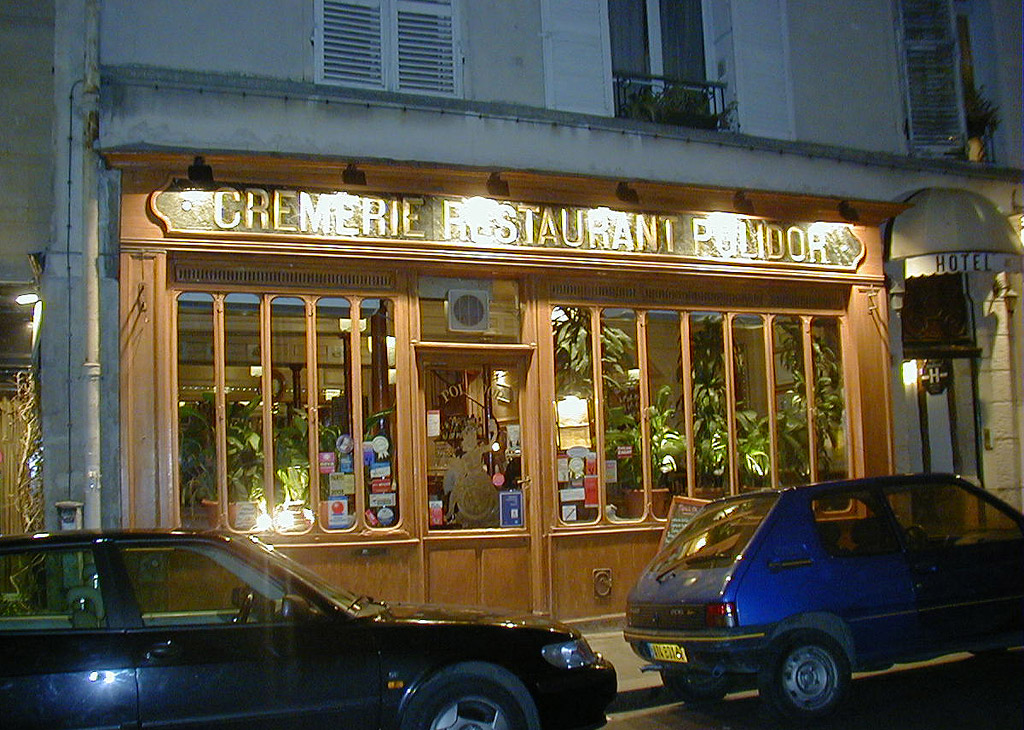
The front of Polidor

- Les Ambassadeurs
- L'Ambroisie – Michelin three-starred restaurant
- L'Arpège – earned one star in the Michelin Guide in its first year, and earned two soon thereafter. It earned three Michelin stars in 1996, which it has maintained since.
- L'As du Fallafel
- L'Astrance
- Bel Canto – chain of restaurants, based in Paris, where singers perform live opera arias for the diners.
- Le Boeuf sur le Toit (cabaret)
- Bouillon – classified as a monument historique since 1989.
- Bouillon Chartier
- Buddha Bar
- Le Chateaubriand
- Le Cinq – opened in 2001 to much fanfare and rapidly achieved 1, 2, then 3 Michelin Red Guide stars under the direction of chef Philippe Legendre before being demoted to 2 stars.
- Clown Bar – opened 1902 near Cirque d'hiver, classed as monument historique in 1995
- Dalloyau
- Les Deux Magots
- Dingo Bar – opened in 1923
- L'Entrecôte
- Fouquet's – founded in 1899
- Le Grand Véfour – opened in the arcades of the Palais-Royal in 1784 by Antoine Aubertot, as the Café de Chartres. When it lost one of its three Michelin stars under the régime of Guy Martin for the Taittinger Group, it was headline news.
- Chez l'Ami Louis – founded in 1924
- La Tour d'Argent – historic restaurant in Paris that has a rating of one star from the Guide Michelin.
- Lapérouse – established in 1766, the restaurant was awarded the prestigious 3 Michelin stars between 1933 and 1968, although it was briefly 2 stars from 1949 to 1951.
- Le Chat Qui Pêche – jazz club and restaurant founded in the mid-1950s, located in a cellar in rue de la Huchette in the Latin Quarter, on the left bank of the Seine.
- Ledoyen – one of the oldest restaurants in Paris
- Ma Bourgogne – bistro
- Maison dorée – former famous restaurant located at 20 Boulevard des Italiens, Paris
- Man Ray – former restaurant-bar
- Maxim's – founded as a bistro in 1893, it is known for its Art Nouveau interior decor
- L'Opéra restaurant
- Polidor – historic restaurant in the 6th arrondissement of Paris, its predecessor was founded in 1845, and it has had its present name since the beginning of the 20th century.
- La Mère Catherine – brasserie in the 18th arrondissement of Paris, France. It is the oldest restaurant located at place du Tertre.
- Restaurant Guy Savoy – Opened in 1980. Ranked the #1 restaurant in the world by La Liste
- Taillevent – founded in 1946, it has received Michelin Stars through the years
- Le Train Bleu – designated a Monument Historique in 1972.

== Cafés ==
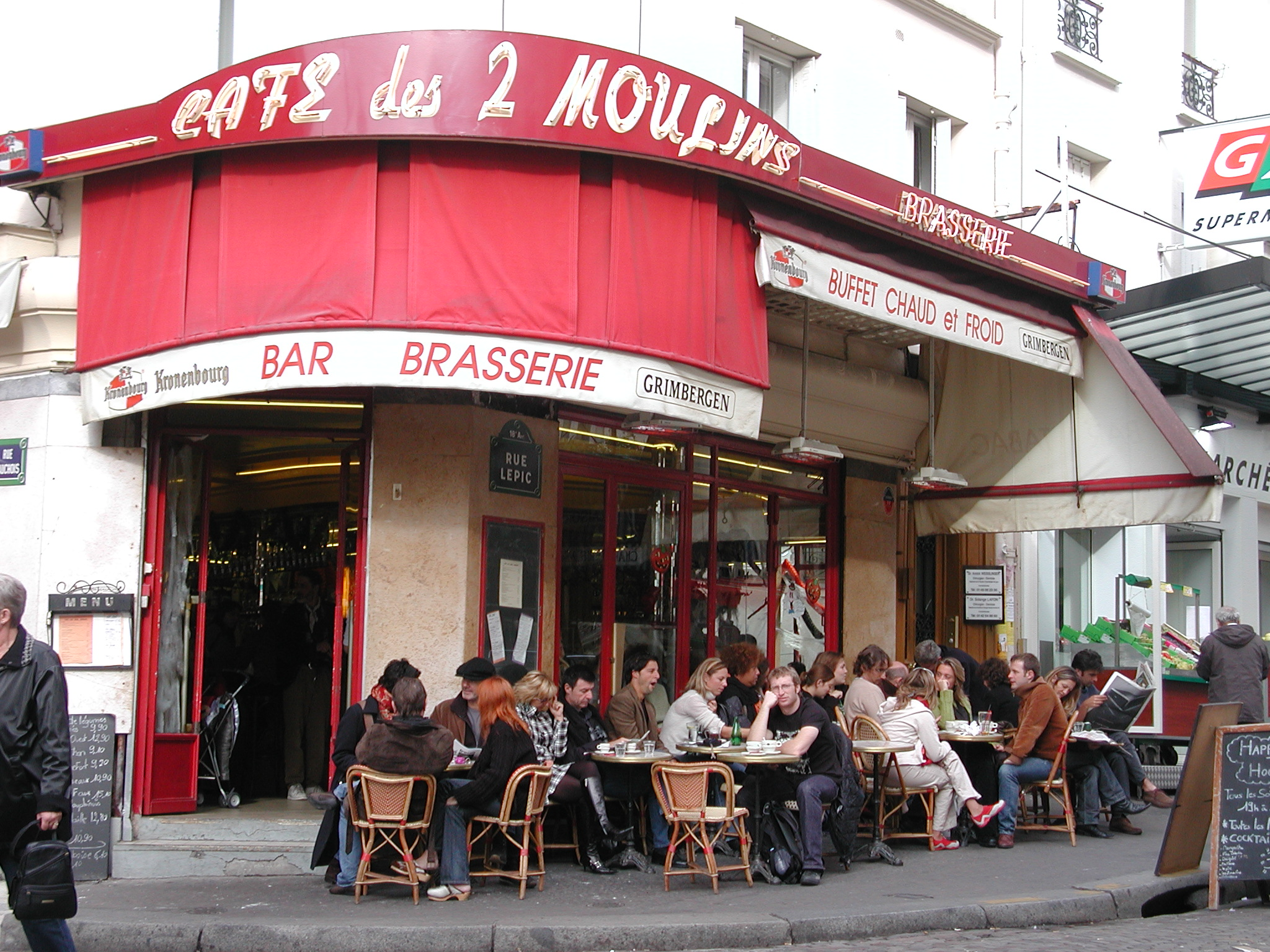
Café des 2 Moulins

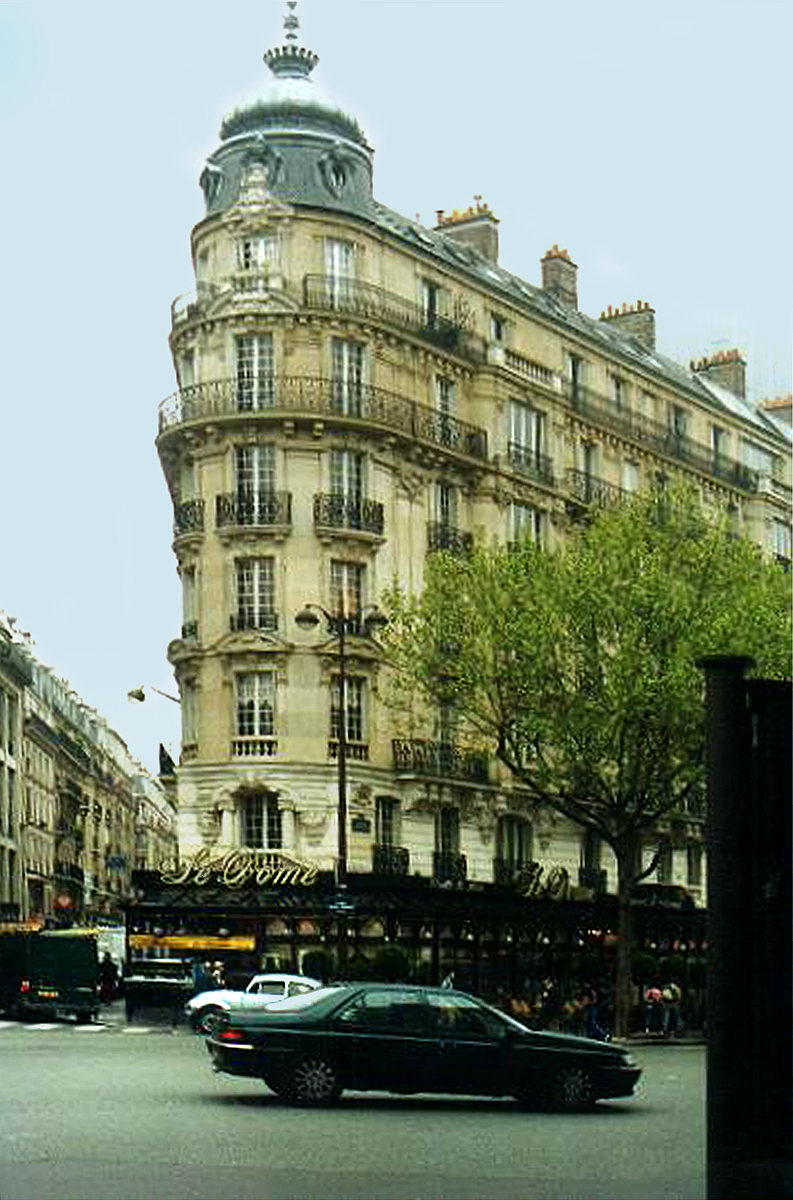
Le Dôme Café

- Angelina – tea house founded in 1903
- Boughnat – term for a person who moved from rural France to Paris, that was later expanded in meaning to include the sense of Parisian cafés owned by bougnats, which would both sell drinks and deliver coal.
- Brasserie Lipp – established in 1880
- Café Anglais
- Café de Flore
- Café de la Nouvelle Athènes
- Café de la Paix
- Café de la Rotonde
- Café des 2 Moulins
- Café du Tambourin
- Café Procope – has been referred to as the oldest restaurant of Paris in continuous operation
- Café Terminus
- Les Deux Magots
- Le Bal Café
- Le Dôme Café – beginning in the 1900s, it was renowned as an intellectual gathering place. Widely known as "the Anglo-American café."
- Le Rat Mort – popular with artists, Bohemians, and intellectuals 1837-1920s
- Parisian café
- Salon Indien du Grand Café

== See also ==
- Bistro
- French cuisine
- List of French restaurants
- List of Michelin-starred restaurants in Paris
- Lists of restaurants
