= Guy Savoy =

French chef (born 1953)

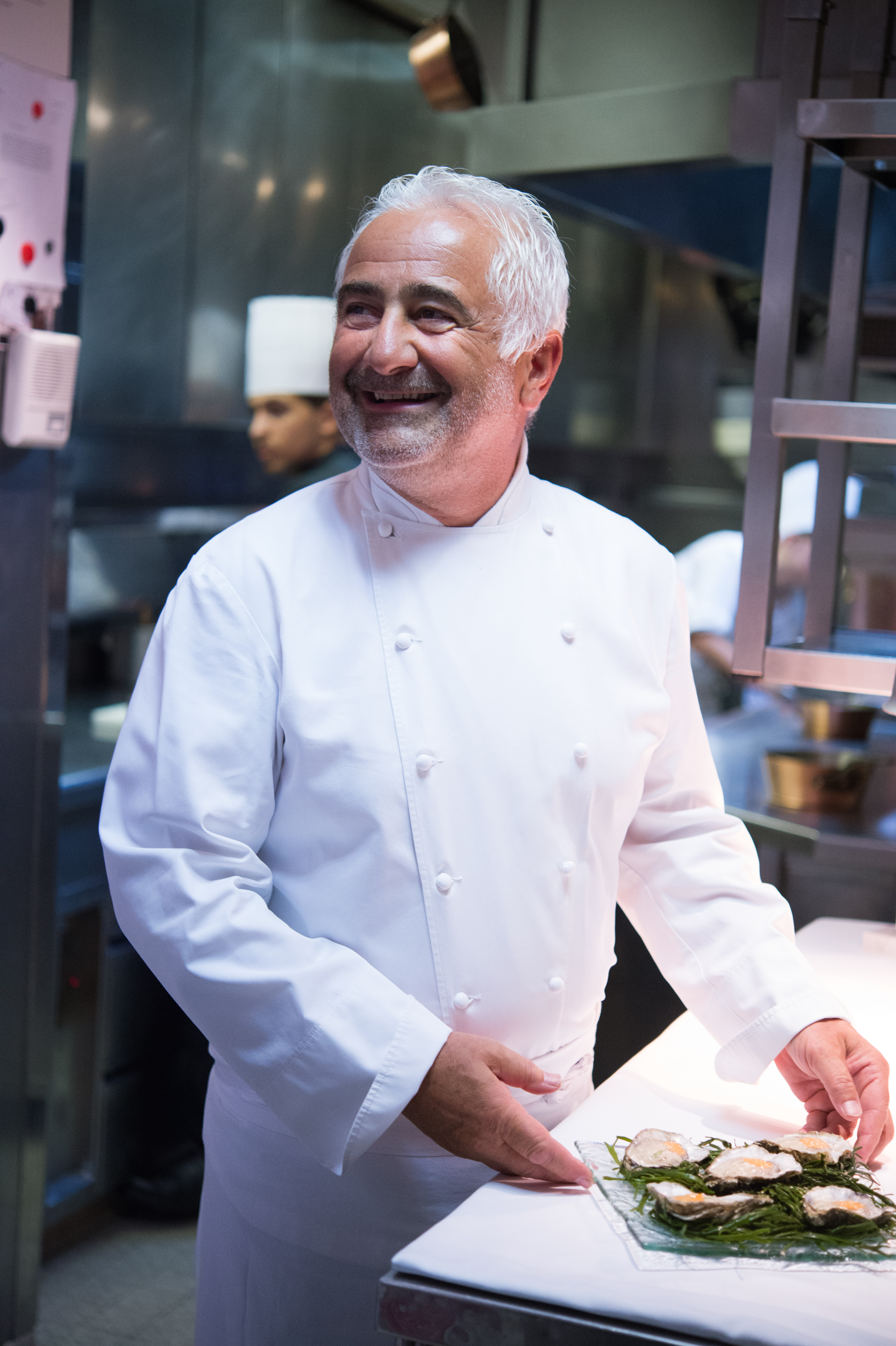
- Guy Savoy on 7 August 2013
- Born: Guy Patrice Savoy; 24 July 1953 (age 73); Nevers, Burgundy, France
- Culinary career
- Cooking style: Nouvelle cuisine
- Ratings
- Paris location Michelin stars, (previously); Las Vegas location Michelin stars none, (previously)
- Current restaurants
- Restaurant Guy Savoy (Paris); Restaurant Guy Savoy (Las Vegas)
- Website: www.guysavoy.com

Guy Patrice Savoy (French: [ɡi savwa]; born 24 July 1953) is a French chef who is the head chef and owner of the eponymous Restaurant Guy Savoy in Paris, France, and its sister restaurant in Las Vegas, U.S., both of which have earned multiple Michelin stars. He owns three other restaurants in Paris.

== Early life ==
Guy Savoy was born on 24 July 1953 in Nevers. In 1955, his parents moved to Bourgoin-Jallieu, a town in Isère, where his father was a gardener and his mother owned a taproom that she would transform into a restaurant. At the age of 16, he began his career as a chocolatier with Louis Marchand in Bourgoin-Jallieu. After a three-year apprenticeship with the Troisgros brothers in Roanne and multiple experiences at prestigious restaurants such as Lasserre, he opened his own restaurant in New York before opening in rue Duret, Paris, in 1980, which received two Michelin stars in 1985. Savoy earned his third Michelin star in 2002. From 2017 to 2026, La Liste named Restaurant Guy Savoy the best restaurant in the world.

== Career ==
Gordon Ramsay was trained under Guy Savoy, and has described him as his culinary mentor.

Savoy opened Restaurant Guy Savoy in Paris in 1980.

Savoy opened the Las Vegas establishment in May 2006 at the Augustus tower of the Caesars Palace then followed by two breakfast take-away bars, Brioche in 2016 at Caesars and then in 2021 at Paris Las Vegas. He opened a restaurant at Porto Arabia, Pearl Qatar in 2012 which closed two years later.

Savoy recorded the voice of sous-chef Horst for the French version of the Pixar animated film Ratatouille, released in August 2007.

Savoy is on the board of directors of the French Mission for Food Culture & Heritage (Mission Française du Patrimoine et des Cultures Alimentaires), which successfully applied for inscription of the "gastronomic meal of the French" on UNESCO's Representative List of the Intangible Cultural Heritage of Humanity.

In 2017 and 2018, Savoy was a member of the Prix Versailles World Judges Panel.

Just days before the release of the 2023 Michelin Guide for France, news broke that Savoy’s eponymous flagship restaurant in Paris was being demoted from three Michelin stars to two.

His favorite vegetable is the artichoke and, according to the New York Times, Savoy's signature dish is "an artichoke soup with black truffle and Parmesan, served with a toasted mushroom brioche slicked in truffle butter."

== Restaurants ==
=== Flagship ===
- Restaurant Guy Savoy – Monnaie de Paris, 11 Quai de Conti – 6th arrondissement of Paris
- Restaurant Guy Savoy – Caesars Palace, Las Vegas, U.S.A.

=== Other ===
- Atelier Maître Albert – 5th arrondissement of Paris
- Le Chiberta – 8th arrondissement of Paris
- Supu Ramen – 6th arrondissement of Paris
- Brioche by Guy Savoy - Caesars Palace & Paris Las Vegas, Las Vegas, U.S.A.

=== Closed ===
- Quisine, Porto Arabia, Pearl-Qatar

== Awards and accolades ==
Savoy received the Legion of Honour (Legion d’Honneur) medal in 2008.

The Las Vegas restaurant has garnered two Michelin stars (2008-2009), the AAA Five Diamond Award, the Forbes Five Star Award, and the Wine Spectator Grand Award.

In 2018, he won the Prix du Rayonnement Gastronomique Français (French Influence Award for Gastronomy).

Restaurant Guy Savoy in Paris was awarded its third Michelin star in 2002; 21 years later, it was demoted to two stars. The restaurant was ranked amongst the Restaurant Top 50 Restaurants in the world in 2004 and 2005.

In 2020, La Liste named it the Best Restaurant in the World for the fourth year in a row. It has five Gault Millau toques and three Pudlowski Guide plates, and is ranked amongst the "best restaurants in Paris" in the Lebey Guide.

In 2026, he was the first chef to be installed a member of the Académie des Beaux-Arts. Savoy holds the seat previously occupied by Michel David-Weill, an investment banker and art collector, in the "free" section, where members are elected who do not meet the traditional categories of painting, sculpture, music, etc. His custom-designed academician's sword was decorated on the bronze hilt with the leaves of the artichoke and inscribed with the motto "Cuisine is the art of instantly transforming products steeped in history into joy."

== Books ==
- Vegetable Magic with Guy Langlois, Ebury Press (1987) ISBN 978-0852236260
- Guy Savoy: Simple French Recipes for the Home Cook (2004) ISBN 978-1584793625
