= List of Michelin-starred restaurants in Paris =

As of the 2026 guide, there are 127 restaurants in Paris with a Michelin-star rating, a rating system that is used by the Michelin Guide to grade restaurants based on their quality.

== 2021–2026 Lists ==
Key
1 Michelin star	One Michelin star
2 Michelin stars	Two Michelin stars
3 Michelin stars	Three Michelin stars
—	The restaurant did not receive a star that year
Closed	The restaurant is no longer open

Michelin-starred restaurants
Name	Cuisine	Location	2021	2022	2023	2024	2025	2026
114 Faubourg	French	Paris – 8th Élysée	1 Michelin star	1 Michelin star	1 Michelin star	1 Michelin star	1 Michelin star	1 Michelin star
Abri	Asian Fusion	Paris – 10th Entrepôt	1 Michelin star	1 Michelin star	Closed			
Accents Table Bourse	French / Japanese	Paris – 2nd Bourse	1 Michelin star	1 Michelin star	1 Michelin star	1 Michelin star	1 Michelin star	1 Michelin star
Aida	Japanese	Paris – 7th Palais-Bourbon	1 Michelin star	1 Michelin star	1 Michelin star	1 Michelin star	1 Michelin star	1 Michelin star
Agapé	French	Paris – 17th Batignolles-Monceau	1 Michelin star	1 Michelin star	—	—	1 Michelin star	1 Michelin star
Akrame	French	Paris – 8th Élysée	1 Michelin star	1 Michelin star	1 Michelin star	1 Michelin star	1 Michelin star	1 Michelin star
Alain Ducasse au Plaza Athénée	French	Paris – 8th Élysée	3 Michelin stars	Closed				
Alan Geaam	Lebanese	Paris – 16th Passy	1 Michelin star	1 Michelin star	1 Michelin star	1 Michelin star	1 Michelin star	1 Michelin star
Aldehyde	Tunisian	Paris – 4th Hôtel-de-Ville	—	—	—	—	1 Michelin star	1 Michelin star
Alliance	French	Paris – 5th Panthéon	1 Michelin star	1 Michelin star	1 Michelin star	1 Michelin star	1 Michelin star	2 Michelin stars
Alléno Paris au Pavillon Ledoyen	French	Paris – 8th Élysée	3 Michelin stars	3 Michelin stars	3 Michelin stars	3 Michelin stars	3 Michelin stars	3 Michelin stars
Amâlia	Italian	Paris – 11th Popincourt	—	—	—	—	1 Michelin star	1 Michelin star
Anne	French	Paris – 3rd Temple	1 Michelin star	1 Michelin star	1 Michelin star	1 Michelin star	1 Michelin star	1 Michelin star
Anona	French	Paris – 17th Batignolles-Monceau	—	—	1 Michelin star	1 Michelin star	1 Michelin star	1 Michelin star
Apicius	French	Paris – 8th Élysée	1 Michelin star	1 Michelin star	1 Michelin star	1 Michelin star	1 Michelin star	1 Michelin star
Armani Ristorante	Italian	Paris – 6th Luxembourg	1 Michelin star	1 Michelin star	1 Michelin star	1 Michelin star	1 Michelin star	1 Michelin star
Arpège	French	Paris – 7th Palais-Bourbon	3 Michelin stars	3 Michelin stars	3 Michelin stars	3 Michelin stars	3 Michelin stars	3 Michelin stars
Aspic	French	Paris – 9th Opéra	1 Michelin star	1 Michelin star	1 Michelin star	—	—	—
Astrance	French	Paris – 16th Passy	—	—	1 Michelin star	1 Michelin star	1 Michelin star	1 Michelin star
AT	French / Japanese	Paris – 5th Panthéon	—	1 Michelin star	1 Michelin star	1 Michelin star	1 Michelin star	1 Michelin star
Auberge Nicolas Flamel	French	Paris – 3rd Temple	—	1 Michelin star	1 Michelin star	—	—	—
Auguste	French	Paris – 7th Palais-Bourbon	1 Michelin star	1 Michelin star	1 Michelin star	1 Michelin star	1 Michelin star	1 Michelin star
Automne	French / Japanese	Paris – 11th Popincourt	1 Michelin star	1 Michelin star	1 Michelin star	1 Michelin star	1 Michelin star	1 Michelin star
Baieta	Mediterranean	Paris – 5th Panthéon	1 Michelin star	1 Michelin star	1 Michelin star	1 Michelin star	1 Michelin star	1 Michelin star
Bellefeuille	French	Paris – 16th Passy	—	1 Michelin star	1 Michelin star	1 Michelin star	1 Michelin star	1 Michelin star
Benoit	French	Paris – 4th Hôtel-de-Ville	1 Michelin star	1 Michelin star	1 Michelin star	1 Michelin star	—	—
Blanc	French	Paris – 16th Passy	—	—	—	1 Michelin star	2 Michelin stars	2 Michelin stars
Carré des Feuillants	French	Paris – 15th Vaugirard	1 Michelin star	Closed				
Chakaiseki Akiyoshi	Japanese	Paris – 15th Vaugirard	—	—	—	1 Michelin star	1 Michelin star	1 Michelin star
Comice	Canadian / French	Paris – 16th Passy	1 Michelin star	1 Michelin star	1 Michelin star	1 Michelin star	1 Michelin star	1 Michelin star
Contraste	French	Paris – 8th Élysée	—	1 Michelin star	1 Michelin star	1 Michelin star	1 Michelin star	1 Michelin star
Copenhague	Danish	Paris – 8th Élysée	1 Michelin star	Closed				
Datil	French	Paris – 3rd Temple	—	—	—	1 Michelin star	1 Michelin star	1 Michelin star
David Toutain	French	Paris – 7th Palais-Bourbon	2 Michelin stars	2 Michelin stars	2 Michelin stars	2 Michelin stars	2 Michelin stars	2 Michelin stars
Divellec	Seafood	Paris – 7th Palais-Bourbon	1 Michelin star	1 Michelin star	1 Michelin star	1 Michelin star	1 Michelin star	1 Michelin star
Dominique Bouchet	French	Paris – 8th Élysée	1 Michelin star	1 Michelin star	Closed			
Don Juan II	French	Paris – 16th Passy	—	1 Michelin star	1 Michelin star	1 Michelin star	1 Michelin star	1 Michelin star
Épicure	French	Paris – 8th Élysée	3 Michelin stars	3 Michelin stars	3 Michelin stars	3 Michelin stars	3 Michelin stars	3 Michelin stars
Episodes (Note: Was named Oka until 2024)	French	Paris – 17th Batignolles-Monceau	1 Michelin star	1 Michelin star	1 Michelin star	1 Michelin star	1 Michelin star	1 Michelin star
ERH	French	Paris – 2nd Bourse	1 Michelin star	1 Michelin star	1 Michelin star	—	—	—
ES	French	Paris – 7th Palais-Bourbon	1 Michelin star	1 Michelin star	1 Michelin star	1 Michelin star	1 Michelin star	1 Michelin star
Espadon	African / French	Paris – 1st Louvre	—	—	—	1 Michelin star	1 Michelin star	1 Michelin star
Étude	French / Japanese	Paris – 16th Passy	1 Michelin star	—	—	—	—	—
FIEF	French	Paris – 11th Popincourt	—	1 Michelin star	1 Michelin star	1 Michelin star	1 Michelin star	1 Michelin star
Fleur de Pavé	French	Paris – 2nd Bourse	1 Michelin star	1 Michelin star	1 Michelin star	1 Michelin star	1 Michelin star	1 Michelin star
Frédéric Simonin	French	Paris – 17th Batignolles-Monceau	1 Michelin star	1 Michelin star	1 Michelin star	1 Michelin star	1 Michelin star	1 Michelin star
Frenchie	French	Paris – 2nd Bourse	1 Michelin star	1 Michelin star	1 Michelin star	1 Michelin star	1 Michelin star	1 Michelin star
Galanga	Mediterranean	Paris – 8th Élysée	—	—	—	1 Michelin star	1 Michelin star	1 Michelin star
Gaya	French	Paris – 7th Palais-Bourbon	1 Michelin star	1 Michelin star	1 Michelin star	1 Michelin star	1 Michelin star	1 Michelin star
Geoélia	Seafood	Paris – 16th Passy	—	—	—	—	—	1 Michelin star
Géosmine	French	Paris – 11th Popincourt	—	—	—	1 Michelin star	1 Michelin star	1 Michelin star
Granite	French	Paris – 1st Louvre	—	1 Michelin star	1 Michelin star	1 Michelin star	1 Michelin star	1 Michelin star
Guy Savoy	French	Paris – 6th Luxembourg	3 Michelin stars	3 Michelin stars	2 Michelin stars	2 Michelin stars	2 Michelin stars	2 Michelin stars
Hakuba	Japanese	Paris – 1st Louvre	—	—	—	—	1 Michelin star	2 Michelin stars
Hanada	Japanese	Paris – 7th Palais-Bourbon	—	—	—	—	—	1 Michelin star
Helen	Seafood	Paris – 8th Élysée	1 Michelin star	1 Michelin star	1 Michelin star	1 Michelin star	1 Michelin star	—
Hémicycle	French / Italian	Paris – 7th Palais-Bourbon	—	—	—	1 Michelin star	1 Michelin star	Closed
Héritages	Modern	Paris – 8th Élysée	—	—	—	—	—	1 Michelin star
Il Carpaccio	Italian	Paris – 8th Élysée	—	1 Michelin star	1 Michelin star	1 Michelin star	1 Michelin star	1 Michelin star
Imperial Treasure	Chinese	Paris – 8th Élysée	—	—	—	—	—	1 Michelin star
Irwin	Modern	Paris – 8th Élysée	—	—	—	—	—	1 Michelin star
Jacques Faussat	French	Paris – 17th Batignolles-Monceau	1 Michelin star	1 Michelin star	1 Michelin star	1 Michelin star	1 Michelin star	1 Michelin star
Jean Imbert	French	Paris – 8th Élysée	—	1 Michelin star	1 Michelin star	1 Michelin star	1 Michelin star	1 Michelin star
Jin	Japanese	Paris – 1st Louvre	1 Michelin star	1 Michelin star	1 Michelin star	—	—	1 Michelin star
Kei	French	Paris – 1st Louvre	3 Michelin stars	3 Michelin stars	3 Michelin stars	3 Michelin stars	3 Michelin stars	3 Michelin stars
Ken Kawasaki	Japanese	Paris – 17th Batignolles-Monceau	1 Michelin star	Closed				
L'Abysse au Pavillon Ledoyen	Japanese	Paris – 8th Élysée	2 Michelin stars	2 Michelin stars	2 Michelin stars	2 Michelin stars	2 Michelin stars	2 Michelin stars
L'Ambroisie	French	Paris – 4th Hôtel-de-Ville	3 Michelin stars	3 Michelin stars	3 Michelin stars	3 Michelin stars	3 Michelin stars	2 Michelin stars
L'Arcane	French	Paris – 18th Butte-Montmartre	1 Michelin star	1 Michelin star	1 Michelin star	1 Michelin star	Closed	
L'Archeste	French	Paris – 16th Passy	1 Michelin star	1 Michelin star	1 Michelin star	1 Michelin star	1 Michelin star	1 Michelin star
L'Arôme	French	Paris – 8th Élysée	1 Michelin star	1 Michelin star	1 Michelin star	1 Michelin star	1 Michelin star	1 Michelin star
L'Atelier de Joël Robuchon - Étoile	French	Paris – 7th Palais-Bourbon	1 Michelin star	1 Michelin star	1 Michelin star	1 Michelin star	1 Michelin star	1 Michelin star
L'Atelier de Joël Robuchon - St. Germain	French	Paris – 8th Élysée	1 Michelin star	1 Michelin star	1 Michelin star	—	—	—
L'Écrin	French	Paris – 8th Élysée	1 Michelin star	1 Michelin star	1 Michelin star	1 Michelin star	1 Michelin star	—
L'Innocence	French	Paris – 9th Opéra	1 Michelin star	1 Michelin star	Closed			
L'Oiseau Blanc	French	Paris – 16th Passy	1 Michelin star	2 Michelin stars	2 Michelin stars	2 Michelin stars	2 Michelin stars	2 Michelin stars
L'Orangerie	French	Paris – 8th Élysée	1 Michelin star	1 Michelin star	1 Michelin star	2 Michelin stars	2 Michelin stars	2 Michelin stars
La Condesa	Mexican	Paris – 9th Opéra	1 Michelin star	1 Michelin star	1 Michelin star	—	—	—
La Dame de Pic	French	Paris – 1st Louvre	1 Michelin star	1 Michelin star	1 Michelin star	1 Michelin star	1 Michelin star	—
La Grande Cascade	French	Paris – 16th Passy	1 Michelin star	1 Michelin star	1 Michelin star	1 Michelin star	1 Michelin star	1 Michelin star
La Scène	French	Paris – 8th Élysée	2 Michelin stars	2 Michelin stars	2 Michelin stars	2 Michelin stars	—	2 Michelin stars
La Scène Thélème	Japanese	Paris – 17th Batignolles-Monceau	1 Michelin star	—	1 Michelin star	1 Michelin star	1 Michelin star	1 Michelin star
La Table d’Eugène	French	Paris – 18th Butte-Montmartre	1 Michelin star	Closed				
La Table de l'Espadon	French	Paris – 1st Louvre	2 Michelin stars	Closed				
Lasserre	French	Paris – 8th Élysée	1 Michelin star	1 Michelin star	1 Michelin star	1 Michelin star	1 Michelin star	1 Michelin star
Le Baudelaire	French	Paris – 1st Louvre	1 Michelin star	1 Michelin star	1 Michelin star	1 Michelin star	1 Michelin star	1 Michelin star
Le Chiberta	French	Paris – 8th Élysée	1 Michelin star	1 Michelin star	1 Michelin star	1 Michelin star	1 Michelin star	Closed
Le Cinq	French	Paris – 8th Élysée	3 Michelin stars	3 Michelin stars	3 Michelin stars	3 Michelin stars	3 Michelin stars	3 Michelin stars
Le Clarence	French	Paris – 8th Élysée	2 Michelin stars	2 Michelin stars	2 Michelin stars	2 Michelin stars	2 Michelin stars	2 Michelin stars
Le Faham	Réunionnaise	Paris – 17th Batignolles-Monceau	1 Michelin star	1 Michelin star	1 Michelin star	1 Michelin star	1 Michelin star	1 Michelin star
Le Gabriel	French	Paris – 8th Élysée	2 Michelin stars	2 Michelin stars	2 Michelin stars	3 Michelin stars	3 Michelin stars	3 Michelin stars
Le George	Italian	Paris – 8th Élysée	1 Michelin star	1 Michelin star	1 Michelin star	1 Michelin star	1 Michelin star	1 Michelin star
Le Grand Restaurant	French	Paris – 8th Élysée	2 Michelin stars	2 Michelin stars	2 Michelin stars	2 Michelin stars	2 Michelin stars	2 Michelin stars
Le Jules Verne	French	Paris – 7th Palais-Bourbon	1 Michelin star	1 Michelin star	1 Michelin star	2 Michelin stars	2 Michelin stars	2 Michelin stars
Le Pré Catelan	French	Paris – 16th Passy	3 Michelin stars	3 Michelin stars	3 Michelin stars	3 Michelin stars	3 Michelin stars	3 Michelin stars
Le Rigmarole	Asian Fusion	Paris – 11th Popincourt	1 Michelin star	1 Michelin star	—	—	—	—
Le Sergent Recruteur	French	Paris – 5th Panthéon	1 Michelin star	1 Michelin star	1 Michelin star	1 Michelin star	1 Michelin star	1 Michelin star
Le Taillevent	French	Paris – 8th Élysée	2 Michelin stars	2 Michelin stars	2 Michelin stars	2 Michelin stars	2 Michelin stars	2 Michelin stars
Le Tout-Paris	French	Paris – 1st Louvre	—	—	—	1 Michelin star	1 Michelin star	1 Michelin star
Le Violon d'Ingres	French	Paris – 7th Palais-Bourbon	1 Michelin star	1 Michelin star	1 Michelin star	1 Michelin star	1 Michelin star	1 Michelin star
Les Climats	French	Paris – 7th Palais-Bourbon	1 Michelin star	1 Michelin star	1 Michelin star	Closed		
Louis	French	Paris – 9th Opéra	1 Michelin star	1 Michelin star	1 Michelin star	1 Michelin star	—	Closed
Loiseau Rive Gauche	French	Paris – 7th Palais-Bourbon	1 Michelin star	Closed				
Lucas Carton	French	Paris – 8th Élysée	1 Michelin star	1 Michelin star	1 Michelin star	1 Michelin star	1 Michelin star	1 Michelin star
Maison Dubois	French	Paris – 8th Élysée	—	—	—	1 Michelin star	1 Michelin star	1 Michelin star
Maison Rostang	French	Paris – 17th Batignolles-Monceau	2 Michelin stars	2 Michelin stars	2 Michelin stars	2 Michelin stars	2 Michelin stars	2 Michelin stars
Maison Ruggieri (Note: Was located in Paris 8th until its temporary closure and re-location in 2025)	French / Italian	Paris – 1st Louvre	—	—	1 Michelin star	2 Michelin stars	Closed	1 Michelin star
Mallory Gabsi	French	Paris – 17th Batignolles-Monceau	—	—	1 Michelin star	1 Michelin star	1 Michelin star	1 Michelin star
Marcore	French	Paris – 2nd Bourse	1 Michelin star	1 Michelin star	Closed			
Marsan	French	Paris – 6th Luxembourg	2 Michelin stars	2 Michelin stars	2 Michelin stars	2 Michelin stars	2 Michelin stars	2 Michelin stars
Mavrommatis	Greek	Paris – 9th Opéra	1 Michelin star	1 Michelin star	1 Michelin star	1 Michelin star	1 Michelin star	1 Michelin star
Monsieur Dior	French	Paris – 8th Élysée	—	—	—	—	—	1 Michelin star
MoSuke	West African / Japanese	Paris – 14th Observatoire	1 Michelin star	1 Michelin star	1 Michelin star	1 Michelin star	1 Michelin star	1 Michelin star
Nakatani	French	Paris – 7th Palais-Bourbon	1 Michelin star	1 Michelin star	1 Michelin star	1 Michelin star	1 Michelin star	1 Michelin star
Neige d'Été	French	Paris – 15th Vaugirard	1 Michelin star	1 Michelin star	1 Michelin star	1 Michelin star	1 Michelin star	1 Michelin star
NESO	French	Paris – 9th Opéra	1 Michelin star	1 Michelin star	1 Michelin star	1 Michelin star	1 Michelin star	1 Michelin star
Nhome	Nordic	Paris – 1st Louvre	—	—	—	1 Michelin star	1 Michelin star	1 Michelin star
Nomicos	Mediterranean	Paris – 16th Passy	1 Michelin star	1 Michelin star	1 Michelin star	1 Michelin star	1 Michelin star	1 Michelin star
Ogata	French	Paris – 3rd Temple	—	1 Michelin star	1 Michelin star	—	—	—
Omar Dhiab	Egyptian / French	Paris – 1st Louvre	—	—	1 Michelin star	1 Michelin star	1 Michelin star	1 Michelin star
Onor	Asian Fusion / French	Paris – 8th Élysée	—	—	—	1 Michelin star	1 Michelin star	1 Michelin star
Origines	French	Paris – 8th Élysée	—	—	—	—	1 Michelin star	1 Michelin star
Ōrtensia	French	Paris – 16th Passy	—	—	1 Michelin star	1 Michelin star	1 Michelin star	1 Michelin star
Oxte	Mexican	Paris – 17th Batignolles-Monceau	1 Michelin star	1 Michelin star	1 Michelin star	1 Michelin star	1 Michelin star	1 Michelin star
Pages	French / Japanese	Paris – 16th Passy	1 Michelin star	1 Michelin star	1 Michelin star	1 Michelin star	1 Michelin star	1 Michelin star
Palais Royal Restaurant	French	Paris – 1st Louvre	1 Michelin star	2 Michelin stars	2 Michelin stars	2 Michelin stars	2 Michelin stars	Closed
Pantagruel	French	Paris – 2nd Bourse	1 Michelin star	1 Michelin star	1 Michelin star	1 Michelin star	1 Michelin star	1 Michelin star
Pavyllon	French	Paris – 8th Élysée	1 Michelin star	1 Michelin star	1 Michelin star	1 Michelin star	1 Michelin star	1 Michelin star
Pertinence	Asian Fusion / French	Paris – 7th Palais-Bourbon	1 Michelin star	1 Michelin star	1 Michelin star	1 Michelin star	1 Michelin star	1 Michelin star
Pierre Gagnaire	French	Paris – 8th Élysée	3 Michelin stars	3 Michelin stars	3 Michelin stars	3 Michelin stars	3 Michelin stars	3 Michelin stars
Pilgrim	French / Japanese	Paris – 15th Vaugirard	1 Michelin star	—	—	—	—	1 Michelin star
Plénitude	French	Paris – 1st Louvre	—	3 Michelin stars	3 Michelin stars	3 Michelin stars	3 Michelin stars	3 Michelin stars
Prévelle	French	Paris – 7th Palais-Bourbon	—	—	—	—	—	1 Michelin star
Pur'	French	Paris – 2nd Bourse	1 Michelin star	1 Michelin star	1 Michelin star	1 Michelin star	1 Michelin star	1 Michelin star
Qui Plume la Lune	French	Paris – 11th Popincourt	1 Michelin star	1 Michelin star	1 Michelin star	1 Michelin star	1 Michelin star	1 Michelin star
Quinsou	French	Paris – 6th Luxembourg	1 Michelin star	1 Michelin star	1 Michelin star	1 Michelin star	1 Michelin star	1 Michelin star
Relais Louis XIII	French	Paris – 6th Luxembourg	1 Michelin star	1 Michelin star	1 Michelin star	1 Michelin star	1 Michelin star	1 Michelin star
Restaurant Le Meurice	French	Paris – 1st Louvre	2 Michelin stars	2 Michelin stars	2 Michelin stars	2 Michelin stars	2 Michelin stars	2 Michelin stars
Restaurant H	French	Paris – 4th Hôtel-de-Ville	1 Michelin star	1 Michelin star	1 Michelin star	1 Michelin star	1 Michelin star	1 Michelin star
Septime	French / Nordic	Paris – 11th Popincourt	1 Michelin star	1 Michelin star	1 Michelin star	1 Michelin star	1 Michelin star	1 Michelin star
Shabour	Israeli	Paris – 2nd Bourse	1 Michelin star	1 Michelin star	1 Michelin star	1 Michelin star	1 Michelin star	1 Michelin star
Shang Palace	Chinese	Paris – 16th Passy	1 Michelin star	1 Michelin star	1 Michelin star	1 Michelin star	—	—
Sola	Japanese	Paris – 5th Panthéon	1 Michelin star	1 Michelin star	1 Michelin star	1 Michelin star	1 Michelin star	1 Michelin star
Solstice	French	Paris – 5th Panthéon	1 Michelin star	1 Michelin star	1 Michelin star	1 Michelin star	1 Michelin star	1 Michelin star
Substance	French	Paris – 16th Passy	—	1 Michelin star	1 Michelin star	1 Michelin star	1 Michelin star	1 Michelin star
Sur Mesure	French	Paris – 1st Louvre	2 Michelin stars	2 Michelin stars	2 Michelin stars	Closed		
Sushi B	Japanese	Paris – 2nd Bourse	1 Michelin star	1 Michelin star	1 Michelin star	1 Michelin star	1 Michelin star	1 Michelin star
Sushi Shunei	Japanese	Paris – 18th Butte-Montmartre	—	1 Michelin star	—	—	1 Michelin star	1 Michelin star
Sushi Yoshinaga	Japanese	Paris – 2nd Bourse	—	—	—	1 Michelin star	2 Michelin stars	2 Michelin stars
Table Bruno Verjus	French	Paris – 12th Reuilly	1 Michelin star	2 Michelin stars	2 Michelin stars	2 Michelin stars	2 Michelin stars	2 Michelin stars
Tomy & Co	French	Paris – 7th Palais-Bourbon	1 Michelin star	1 Michelin star	1 Michelin star	1 Michelin star	1 Michelin star	1 Michelin star
La Tour d'Argent	French	Paris – 5th Panthéon	1 Michelin star	1 Michelin star	1 Michelin star	1 Michelin star	1 Michelin star	1 Michelin star
Trente-Trois	French	Paris – 8th Élysée	1 Michelin star	1 Michelin star	1 Michelin star	1 Michelin star	1 Michelin star	1 Michelin star
Vaisseau	Creative	Paris – 11th Popincourt	—	—	—	—	1 Michelin star	1 Michelin star
Virtus	French	Paris – 12th Reuilly	1 Michelin star	1 Michelin star	1 Michelin star	1 Michelin star	1 Michelin star	2 Michelin stars
Yam'Tcha	Asian Fusion	Paris – 1st Louvre	1 Michelin star	1 Michelin star	1 Michelin star	1 Michelin star	1 Michelin star	Closed
Yoshinori	French / Japanese	Paris – 6th Luxembourg	1 Michelin star	1 Michelin star	1 Michelin star	1 Michelin star	1 Michelin star	1 Michelin star
Ze Kitchen Galerie	Asian Fusion	Paris – 6th Luxembourg	1 Michelin star	1 Michelin star	1 Michelin star	1 Michelin star	1 Michelin star	1 Michelin star
Zostera	Seafood	Paris – 16th Passy	—	—	—	—	—	1 Michelin star
Reference(s)								

== See also ==
- List of Michelin 3-star restaurants
- List of Michelin-starred restaurants in France
- List of restaurants in Paris
- Lists of restaurants
