= Table by Bruno Verjus =

Restaurant in Paris, France

Coordinates: 48°50′56″N 2°22′33″E

- Interactive map of Table by Bruno Verjus

Restaurant information
- Head chef: Bruno Verjus
- Food type: Creative
- Rating: (Michelin Guide)
- Location: 3 R. de Prague, Paris, 75012, France
- Website: table.paris

Table by Bruno Verjus (French: [tabl]) is a restaurant in Paris. It has earned two stars in the Michelin Guide and has ranked in the top 10 of The World's 50 Best Restaurants list.

== See also ==
- List of Michelin-starred restaurants in Paris
