= La Liste =

List of the world's best restaurants

La Liste is a French privately owned ranking and restaurant guide. Launched in Paris in 2015, and initially a list of the 1,000 best restaurants in the world, it lists 20,000 restaurants in 195 countries by aggregating over 700 guides and publications and is often cited as the reply to the British-published gastronomic guide World's 50 Best Restaurants. La Liste guide and results are available on their website and through La Liste iOS and Android apps.

The founder of La Liste, Ambassador Philippe Faure, was previously the CEO of Gault & Millau, and the former Head of the French Tourist Board. He also served as the ambassador of France to Japan from 2007 to 2011, as well as to Mexico and Morocco. Corporate sponsors of La Liste include Moët Hennessy, American Express, ABInbev, Marché International de Rungis and Accor Hotels.

== Methodology ==
La Liste is compiled using a data processing algorithm. The list factors in more than 700 international dining guides, crowd-sourced sites (such as Yelp and TripAdvisor) or press reviews (The New York Times, Washington Post...). Among those sources, La Liste also takes into consideration Zagat, Michelin Guide, the James Beard Award, Gault & Millau, OpenTable.

== LA LISTE 2026 ==
Top ten restaurants
Rank	Restaurant	Location	Score
1	Cheval Blanc by Peter Knogl – Grand Hôtel Les Trois Rois	Basel, Switzerland	99.50
1	Da Vittorio	Brusaporto, Italy	99.50
1	Restaurant Guy Savoy	Paris, France	99.50
1	Le Bernardin	New York, United States	99.50
1	Lung King Heen	Hong Kong, China	99.50
1	Martin Berasategui	Lasarte-Oria, Spain	99.50
1	Matsukawa	Minato-ku, Japan	99.50
1	Robuchon au Dome	(Macau) Macao, China	99.50
1	Schwarzwaldstube	Baiersbronn, Germany	99.50
1	SingleThread	Healdsburg, United States	99.50

== LA LISTE 2025 ==
Top nine restaurants
Rank	Restaurant	Location	Score
1	Cheval Blanc by Peter Knogl – Grand Hôtel Les Trois Rois	Basel, Switzerland	99.50
1	Restaurant Guy Savoy	Paris, France	99.50
1	L'Enclume	Grange-over Sandis, United Kingdom	99.50
1	La Vague d'Or - Le Cheval Blanc	Saint-Tropez, France	99.50
1	Le Bernardin	New York, United States	99.50
1	Lung King Heen	Hong Kong, China	99.50
1	Matsukawa	Minato-ku, Japan	99.50
1	Schwarzwaldstube	Baiersbronn, Germany	99.50
1	SingleThread	Healdsburg, United States	99.50

== LA LISTE 2023 ==
Top nine restaurants
Rank	Restaurant	Location	Score
1	Frantzén	Stockholm, Sweden	99.50
1	Restaurant Guy Savoy	Paris, France	99.50
1	Le Bernardin	New York, United States	99.50
4	Cheval Blanc by Peter Knogl – Grand Hôtel Les Trois Rois	Basel, Switzerland	99.00
4	L'Assiette Champenoise	Tinqueux, France	99.00
4	La Vague d'Or - Le Cheval Blanc	Saint-Tropez, France	99.00
4	Martín Berasategui	Lasarte-Oria, Spain	99.00
4	Restaurant de l'Hôtel de Ville	Crissier, Switzerland	99.00
4	鮨さいとう - Sushi Saito	Minato-ku, Japan	99.00

Top 10 countries by number of restaurants in the list
Rank	Country	Number of restaurants	Highest rank
1	Japan	135	4
2	China total (China) (Hong Kong) (Macau)	120 (82) (23) (15)	(34) (142) (34)
3	France	107	1
4	United States	106	1
5	Italy	78	10
6	United Kingdom	68	19
7	Spain	59	4
8	Germany	58	10
9	Switzerland	39	1
10	South Korea	36	189

Top 10 restaurants in France
Rank	Overall rank	Restaurant	Location	Score
1	1	Restaurant Guy Savoy	Paris	99.5
2	4	L'Assiette Champenoise	Tinqueux	99
2	4	La Vague d'Or - Le Cheval Blanc	Saint-Tropez	99
4	10	L'Ambroisie	Paris	98.5
4	10	L'Auberge du Vieux Puits	Fontjoncouse	98.5
4	10	Plénitude	Paris	98.5
7	19	Georges Blanc	Vonnas	98
7	19	Maison Pic	Valence	98
7	19	Mirazur	Menton	98
7	19	Régis et Jacques Marcon	Saint-Bonnet-le-Froid	98

Top 11 restaurants in the United States
Rank	Overall rank	Restaurant	Location	Score
1	1	Le Bernardin	New York	99.5
2	19	Manresa	Los Gatos	98.0
2	19	The French Laundry	Yountville	98.0
4	34	SingleThread	Healdsburg	97.5
5	58	Daniel	New York	97.0
6	78	Alinea	Chicago	96.5
6	78	Atelier Crenn	San Francisco	96.5
6	78	The Inn at Little Washington	Washington, Virginia	96.5
9	118	Harbor House Inn	Elk, California	96.0
9	118	Jean-Georges	New York	96.0
9	118	Chef's Table at Brooklyn Fare	New York	96.0

== LA LISTE 2019 ==
Top 10 restaurants
Rank	Restaurant	Location	Score
1	Guy Savoy	Paris, France	99.75
1	Le Bernardin	New York, United States	99.75
3	Alain Ducasse au Plaza Athénée	Paris, France	99.50
3	Martín Berasategui	Lasarte-Oria, Spain	99.50
3	Matsukawa	Tokyo, Japan	99.50
6	L'Arpège	Paris, France	99.25
6	Restaurant de l'Hôtel de Ville	Crissier, Switzerland	99.25
6	The French Laundry	Yountville, United States	99.25
6	Eleven Madison Park	New York, United States	99.25
10	L'Auberge du Vieux Puits	Fontjoncouse, France	99.00
10	La Vague d'Or	Saint-Tropez, France	99.00
10	Schwarzwaldstube	Baiersbronn-Tonbach, Germany	99.00
10	Kyubey	Tokyo, Japan	99.00
10	Kyo Aji	Tokyo, Japan	99.00

Top 10 countries by number of restaurants in the list
Rank	Country	Number of restaurants	Highest rank
1	Japan	148	3
2	China (Hong Kong) (Macau)	134 (22) (4)	19 (56) (158)
3	France	116	1
4	United States	91	1
5	Spain	63	3
6	United Kingdom	60	83
7	Germany	53	10
8	Italy	51	15
9	Switzerland	35	6
10	Mexico	31	64

Top 10 restaurants in France
Rank	Overall rank	Restaurant	Location	Score
1	1	Guy Savoy	Paris	99.75
2	3	Alain Ducasse au Plaza Athénée	Paris	99.50
3	6	L'Arpège	Paris	99.25
4	10	L'Auberge du Vieux Puits	Fontjoncouse	99.00
4	10	La Vague d'Or	Saint-Tropez	99.00
6	15	Le Pré Catelan	Paris	98.75
6	15	L'Assiette Champenoise	Tinqueux	98.75
8	19	L'Ambroisie	Paris	98.50
8	19	Régis et Jacques Marcon	Saint-Bonnet-le-Froid	98.50
10	27	Pavillon Ledoyen - Yannick Alleno	Paris	98.25

Top 10 restaurants in the United States
Rank	Overall rank	Restaurant	Location	Score
1	1	Le Bernardin	New York	99.75
2	6	The French Laundry	Yountville	99.25
2	6	Eleven Madison Park	New York	99.25
4	15	The Inn at Little Washington	Washington, Virginia	98.75
5	39	Blue Hill at Stone Barns	Tarrytown	97.75
6	45	Jean-Georges	New York	97.50
7	45	The Restaurant at Meadowood	Napa Valley	97.50
8	56	Alinea	Chicago	97.00
9	70	Daniel	New York	96.50
10	103	Manresa	Los Gatos	95.25

Highest rank restaurants by country
Rank	Restaurant	Country	Score
1	Restaurant Guy Savoy	France	99.75
1	Le Bernardin	United States	99.75
3	Matsukawa	Japan	99.50
3	Martín Berasategui	Spain	99.50
6	Restaurant de l'Hôtel de Ville	Switzerland	99.25
10	Schwarzwaldstube	Germany	99.00
15	Calandre	Italy	98.75
19	Hertog Jan	Belgium	98.50
19	京华阁 The Capital	China	98.50
19	Le Louis XV - Alain Ducasse	Monaco	98.50
19	Inter Scaldes	Netherlands	98.50
32	Attica	Australia	98.00
32	Alo	Canada	98.00
51	Don Alfonso 1890	Italy	97.25
56	Geranium	Denmark	97.00
56	龙景轩 Lung King Heen	Hong Kong	97.00
64	Dulce Patria	Mexico	96.75
70	Obauer	Austria	96.50
77	Frantzén	Sweden	96.25
83	Maní	Brazil	96.00
83	The Ocean	Portugal	96.00
83	Gordon Ramsay	United Kingdom	96.00
96	Maido	Peru	95.50
96	Savva at Hotel Metropol	Russia	95.50
114	Maaemo	Norway	94.75
119	Nicole	Turkey	94.50
135	Le Normandie	Thailand	93.75
146	Lumina by Meir Adoni	Israel	93.25
158	Mosconi	Luxembourg	92.75
158	京花轩 Golden Flower at Encore Macau	Macau	92.75
158	The Test Kitchen	South Africa	92.75
204	La Grande Table Marocaine- Royal Mansour	Morocco	91.00
216	The French Café	New Zealand	90.50
239	Patrick Guilbaud	Ireland	89.75
275	Waku Ghin	Singapore	88.50
344	La Yeon - The Shilla	South Korea	86.50
359	MAK	Slovenia	86.25
371	祥雲龍吟 RyuGin Taipei	Taiwan	86.00
399	Idam - An Alain Ducasse Restaurant	Qatar	85.50
435	Spondi	Greece	84.75
574	Onyx	Hungary	83.00
627	Marée	Liechtenstein	82.25
657	Mishiguene	Argentina	81.75
696	Rafael	Colombia	81.25
696	Monte	Croatia	81.25
696	Koks Restaurant	Faroe Islands	81.25
696	Gallery Vask	Philippines	81.25
696	Amber Room	Poland	81.25
761	Boragó	Chile	81.00
761	Alcron	Czech Republic	81.00
761	Indian Accent - The Manor	India	81.00
761	Métis	Indonesia	81.00
761	Haft Khan	Iran	81.00
830	Ask	Finland	80.75
830	Café Littera	Georgia	80.75
861	Dill	Iceland	80.50
861	Tugra	Saudi Arabia	80.50
861	La Petite Maison	United Arab Emirates	80.50
861	Square One at Park Hyatt Saigon	Vietnam	80.50
998	Kook	Angola	80.00
998	Rasoi by Vineet, Gulf Hotel Bahrain	Bahrain	80.00
998	The Planter's at The Danna	Malaysia	80.00
998	Velaa Private Island	Maldives	80.00
998	De Mondion at The Xara Palace	Malta	80.00
998	NOK by Alara	Nigeria	80.00
998	La Case Pitey	Réunion	80.00
998	Tri	Sri Lanka	80.00
998	La Bourgogne	Uruguay	80.00

== LA LISTE 2017 ==
The 2017 ranking was released on December 5, 2016, in Paris. Restaurants are now rated on a Parker-style scale ranging from 80 to 100, with 0,25 increments. Japan is still in the lead with 116 restaurants in the top 1000, followed by France with 113 and China with 100. Actual number of restaurants listed is 1,076 because the score 83.25 is shared by 87 restaurants from rank 990 to 1,076.

Restaurants rated 99 or above
Rank	Restaurant	Location	Score
1	Guy Savoy	Paris, France	99.75
2	Le Bernardin	New York City, United States	99.50
2	Kyo Aji	Tokyo, Japan	99.50
4	El Celler de Can Roca	Girona, Spain	99.25
4	Alain Ducasse au Plaza Athénée	Paris, France	99.25
4	Jean Georges	New York City, United States	99.25
4	Osteria Francescana	Modena, Italy	99.25
4	Kyubey	Tokyo, Japan	99.25
9	Restaurant de l'Hôtel de Ville	Crissier, Switzerland	99
9	Joël Robuchon	Tokyo, Japan	99
9	Cheval Blanc - Hôtel Les Trois Rois	Basel, Switzerland	99
9	Régis & Jacques Marcon	Saint-Bonnet-le-Froid, France	99
9	L'Assiette champenoise	Tinqueux, France	99
9	Da Vittorio	Brusaporto, Italy	99

== LA LISTE 2016 ==
Japan tops the list with 127 restaurants followed by France with 118 and the United States with 101.

Top 10 restaurants
Rank	Restaurant	Location	Score
1	Restaurant de l'Hôtel de Ville	Crissier, Switzerland	82.35
2	Per Se	New York City, United States	82.30
3	Kyo Aji	Tokyo, Japan	82.00
4	Guy Savoy	Paris, France	81.44
5	Schauenstein	Fürstenau, Switzerland	81.37
6	El Celler de Can Roca	Girona, Spain	81.17
7	Kyubey	Tokyo, Japan	79.88
8	La Maison Troisgros	Roanne, France	79.81
9	Auberge du Vieux Puits	Fontjoncouse, France	79.80
10	Joël Robuchon	Tokyo, Japan	79.77

Top 10 restaurants in France
Rank	Overall rank	Restaurant	Location	Score
1	4	Restaurant Guy Savoy	Paris	81.44
2	8	La Maison Troisgros	Roanne	79.81
3	9	Auberge du Vieux Puits	Fontjoncouse	79.80
4	11	Régis et Jacques Marcon	St-Bonnet-le-Froid	79.75
5	12	Flocons de Sel	Leutaz	79.47
6	13	Les Prés d'Eugénie - Michel Guérard	Eugénie-les-Bains	79.32
7	16	Pierre Gagnaire	Paris	77.96
8	20	Le Pré Catelan	Paris	77.28
9	29	Lameloise	Chagny	76.66
10	31	Maison Pic	Valence	76.49

Top 10 restaurants in Switzerland
Rank	Overall rank	Restaurant	Location	Score
1	1	Restaurant de l'Hôtel de Ville	Crissier	82.35
2	5	Schauenstein	Fürstenau	81.37
3	67	Cheval Blanc - Hôtel Les Trois Rois	Basel	73.73
4	93	Adelboden	Steinen	72.60
5	113	The Restaurant	Zürich	72.08
6	131	Domaine de Châteauvieux	Peney-Dessus	71.48
7	140	Georges Wenger	Le Noirmont	71.23
8	146	Stucki - Tanja Grandits	Basel	71.09
9	147	Bumanns Gourmetrestaurant Chesa Pirani	La Punt Chamues-ch	71.09
10	159	L'Ermitage de Bernard Ravet	Vufflens-le-Chateau	70.75

Top 10 restaurants in Japan
Rank	Overall rank	Restaurant	Location	Score
1	3	Kyo Aji	Tokyo	82.00
2	7	Kyubey	Tokyo	79.88
3	10	Joël Robuchon	Yebisu Garden Place	79.77
4	14	Nihonryori Ryugin	Tokyo	78.74
5	24	Kyo-ryori Nakamura	Kyoto	76.96
6	25	Matsukawa	Tokyo	76.92
7	28	Quintessence	Tokyo	76.70
8	37	Oryouri Hayashi	Kyoto	75.55
9	39	Kikunoi Honten	Kyoto	75.41
10	50	Maruyama (Gion)	Kyoto	74.61

Top 10 restaurants in the United States
Rank	Overall rank	Restaurant	Location	Score
1	2	Per Se	New York City	82.30
2	19	Le Bernardin	New York	77.44
3	51	Jean-Georges	New York	74.53
4	241	Eleven Madison Park	New York	68.83
5	268	Joël Robuchon	Las Vegas	68.29
6	275	Saison	San Francisco	68.17
7	282	The Restaurant at Meadowood	St. Helena, California	68.05
8	305	Atera	New York	67.37
9	310	The French Laundry	Yountville, California	67.31
10	320	Daniel	New York	67.12

Top 10 countries by number of restaurants in the list
Rank	Country	Number of restaurants	Highest rank
1	Japan	127	3
2	France	118	4
3	United States	101	2
4	China (Hong Kong) (Macao)	69 (22) ( 4)	42
5	Spain	59	6
6	Germany	52	30
7	Italy	50	18
8	United Kingdom	46	41
9	Switzerland	30	1
10	India	29	591

== See also ==
- World’s 50 Best Restaurants
- List of Michelin 3-star restaurants
- Lists of restaurants
