= Jean-Georges =

Restaurant in New York City

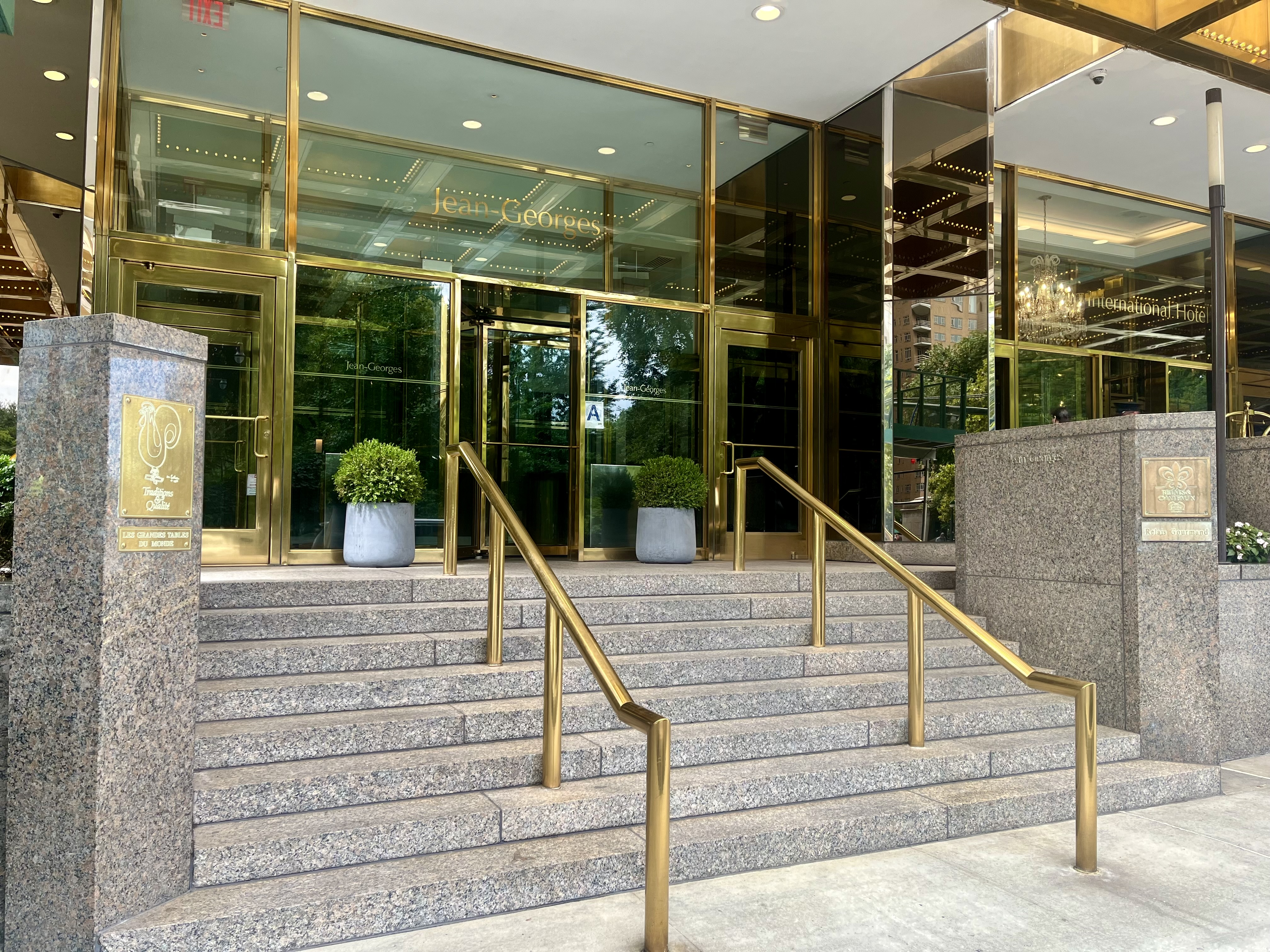
- The restaurant's exterior in 2024
- Interactive map of Jean-Georges

Restaurant information
- Established: 1997; 29 years ago
- Head chef: Mark LaPico
- Food type: New French
- Dress code: Jackets are encouraged
- Rating: Michelin Guide
- Location: 1 Central Park West (between West 60th Street and West 61st Street), on the lobby level of the Trump International Hotel and Tower, on the Upper West Side of Manhattan, New York City, New York, 10023, United States
- Coordinates: 40°46′8.5″N 73°58′54″W
- Website: www.jean-georgesrestaurant.com

Jean-Georges is a two-Michelin-star restaurant at 1 Central Park West (between West 60th Street and West 61st Street), on the lobby level of the Trump International Hotel and Tower, on the Upper West Side of Manhattan, New York City, named after its owner Jean-Georges Vongerichten.

According to the Michelin Guide, it is one of the top five best French restaurants in the Americas. It also remains one of the few restaurants in the city awarded four stars by The New York Times. The current executive chef is Mark LaPico and executive pastry chef is Sean Considine.

== Awards ==
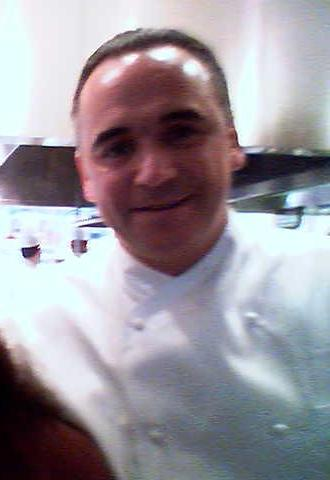
Jean-Georges Vongerichten at his flagship restaurant Jean-Georges

Besides four stars from The New York Times, Jean-Georges has received the James Beard award for Best Chef and Best New Restaurant, and Esquire voted Chef Vongerichten the Chef of the Year in 1997. Jean-Georges restaurant formerly held three Michelin stars.

Since 1998, it has been the recipient of the AAA Five Star Award.

In 2008 it received an 18/20 "Excellent" rating. In 2009 it won the James Beard Foundation Award for outstanding restaurant.

In 2007, Jean-Georges' executive sous chef Lia Bardeen was featured as a contestant on season three of Top Chef, the cooking reality competition on the Bravo network.

In 2010, Jean-Georges won the James Beard Award for "Outstanding Wine Service".

In 2013, Zagat's gave it a food rating of 28, the second-highest in the West 60s, and rated it the sixth-best restaurant in New York City.

In December 2015 Jean-Georges was ranked number 3 in the United States and 51st in the world by La Liste; in the inaugural edition of the list of the 1,000 best restaurants in the world sanctioned by France's Foreign Ministry.

== See also ==
- List of French restaurants
- List of Michelin-starred restaurants in New York City
