= Bistro =

Small restaurant

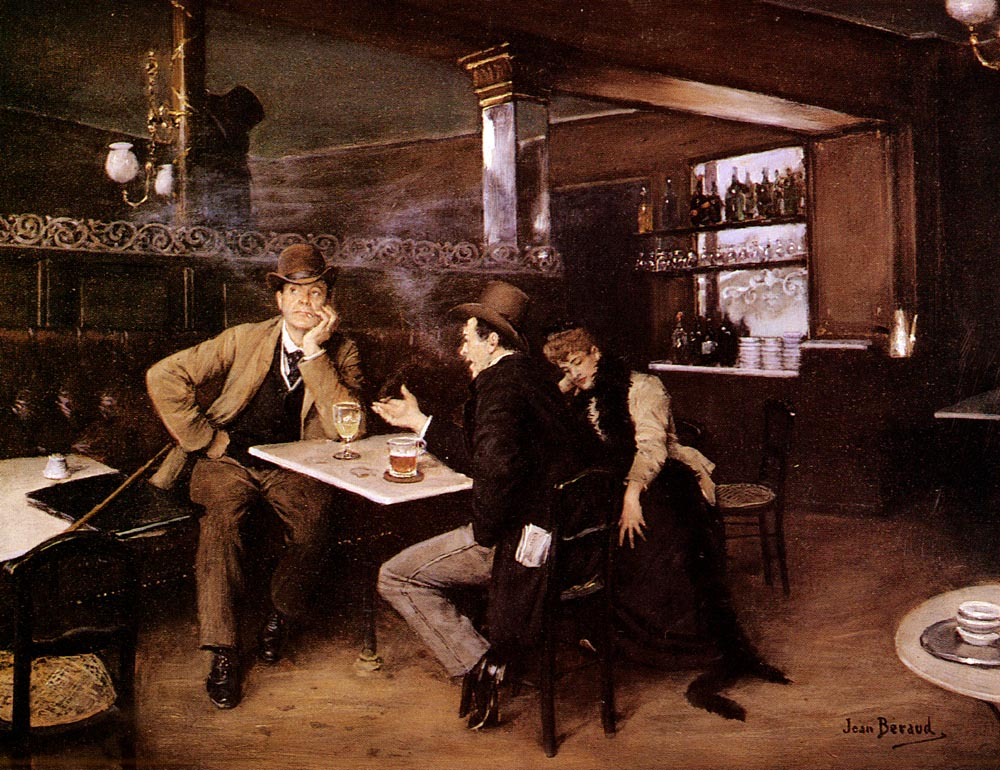
At the Bistro, Jean Béraud

A bistro or bistrot (/ˈbiːstroʊ/), in its original Parisian form, is a small restaurant serving moderately priced, simple meals in a modest setting.

== Style ==
In a 2007 survey of national cuisines, a bistro is characterised as typically:

a neighborhood restaurant where one can partake of French home cooking, typically robust, earthy dishes such as cassoulet .... Bistros are not temples of haute cuisine, but places for affordable and simple country food.

A Paris newspaper in 1892 referred to dishes served at a bistro, including escargots, veal with sauce ravigote, navarin of lamb, hachis Parmentier, eggs, sausages and hot roast chicken.

The Oxford Companion to Food comments that the idea of simple inexpensive food served in a French atmosphere has wide appeal, so that by the end of the 20th century the term had "begun to be annexed by more pretentious premises". (Note: In the 21st century a Parisian bistro, Le Benoit, has a Michelin Guide star rating.)

== Etymology ==
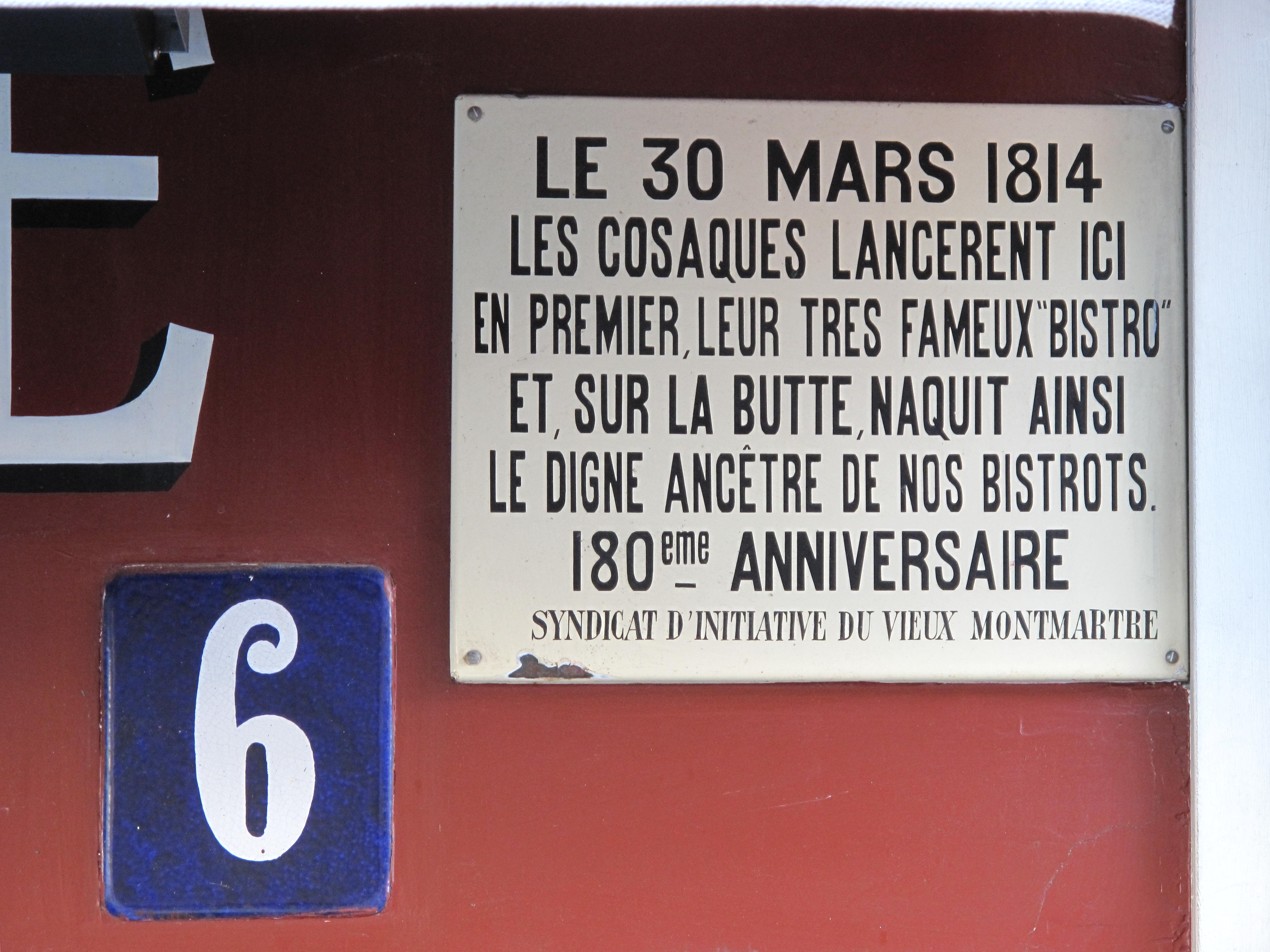
Plaque about the legend of the origin of the word "Bistro" at La Mère Catherine, 6, place du Tertre, Paris. (English: On March 30, 1814, the Cossacks were the first to launch their very famous "bistro" here and, on the hill, the worthy ancestor of our bistros was born. 180th anniversary. Tourist Office of Old Montmartre)

The etymology is unclear. The Dictionnaire de l'Académie française dates the word from the 19th-century term bistro ("innkeeper") and suggests that it may be linked to the Poitevin word bistraud ("little servant") or to bistrouille ("cheap liquor"). It recommends the spelling "bistrot" in preference to "bistro".

The word was used to describe a drinking establishment, estaminet ("saloon"), or small popular local restaurant where alcoholic beverages were served. In the early part of the 19th century, the term "gargote" signified a basic style of restaurant, (Note: Defined by the Dictionnaire de l'Académie française as a "Restaurant à bas prix, où l'on sert une nourriture médiocre" − a low-cost restaurant, serving mediocre food.) but the term "bistro" or "bistrot" was not recorded until toward the end of the century. An early appearance of the term in print is in Les deux gosses by Pierre Decourcelle, published in 1880. (Note: "un 'bistrot' à côté de chez elle ou ils se réunissent tous." – "a 'bistrot' next to her house where they all meet".)

A popular folk etymology, not attested by the Dictionnaire de l'Académie française, claims that the word originated among Russian troops who, following the Battle of Paris in March 1814, occupied the city and visited these tiny places to drink a coffee. They might have shouted Bistro! Bistro! (Russian: быстро, lit. 'quickly') when they wished to be served quickly. This etymology has been dismissed by linguists, because there is no attestation to the occurrence of the term until the late 19th century.

== Evolution ==
The bistro became familiar in France throughout the 19th century. During this period, the Auvergnats (French people originating from the Auvergne region), often called the "bougnats", transformed and developed the French bistro. Indeed, they started to offer meats with their choice of wines and spirits. Another older definition of bistro is a wine merchant serving simple cuisine along with tasting samples of offered wines to potential buyers.

In the 20th century these places became very popular and widely represented the diversity of Parisian life. More than that, bistros became the hallmark of the French lifestyle and inspired a multitude of artists (painters, photographers, writers, etc.).

== See also ==
- Brasserie, a slightly more formal French restaurant that may brew its own beer
- Diner, an inexpensive restaurant in North America that is well-known for offering breakfast foods
- Parisian café, centers of French social and culinary life
- Sidewalk cafe, a serviced portion of a bar or restaurant located on a sidewalk
