= Restaurant Guy Savoy =

French restaurant in Paris, France and Las Vegas, Nevada, US

Restaurant information
- Established: Paris 1980; 46 years ago Las Vegas 2006; 20 years ago
- Owner: Guy Savoy
- Food type: Gourmet French
- Dress code: Jacket Requested
- Rating: (Paris) (Michelin Guide); (Las Vegas) (Michelin Guide)
- Location: 11 quai de Conti, Paris, France
- Website: guysavoy.com

Restaurant Guy Savoy (French: [ɡi savwa]; is a French restaurant located in Paris, France created by Guy Savoy in 1980. A second location opened at Caesars Palace on the Las Vegas Strip in 2006.

== History ==
The Paris location opened in 1980 and moved to a larger space in 1987 and eventually moved to the French national mint building, Monnaie de Paris, in May 2015. Designed by French architect Jean-Michel Wilmotte, the restaurant features six dining rooms, and a backdrop of the Seine with many works of art loaned by François Pinault.

The Las Vegas location opened in 2006, located in the Augustus Tower inside Caesars Palace on the Las Vegas Strip, was designed to replicate the Paris location.

== Menu ==
Restaurant Guy Savoy offers an à la carte menu along with a 13-course tasting menu.

== Awards and accolades ==
The Paris location was awarded 3 Michelin stars in 2002 and maintained the rating until 2023 when it was downgraded to 2 stars. The Paris location was ranked #1 on the list of Top 1,000 restaurants in 2017-2026.

The Las Vegas location was awarded 2 Michelin stars in 2008 and 2009. The Las Vegas location has earned Wine Spectator’s Grand Award, the Forbes Five-Star Restaurant award and the AAA Five Diamond Designation every year since 2008.

== See also ==
- List of Michelin-starred restaurants in the American Southwest
- List of Michelin-starred restaurants in Paris
- List of restaurants in the Las Vegas Valley
- List of restaurants in Paris
