= Hotel Les Trois Rois =

Building in Basel, Switzerland

Grand Hôtel Les Trois Rois Hotel Drei Könige/Hotel of the Three Kings
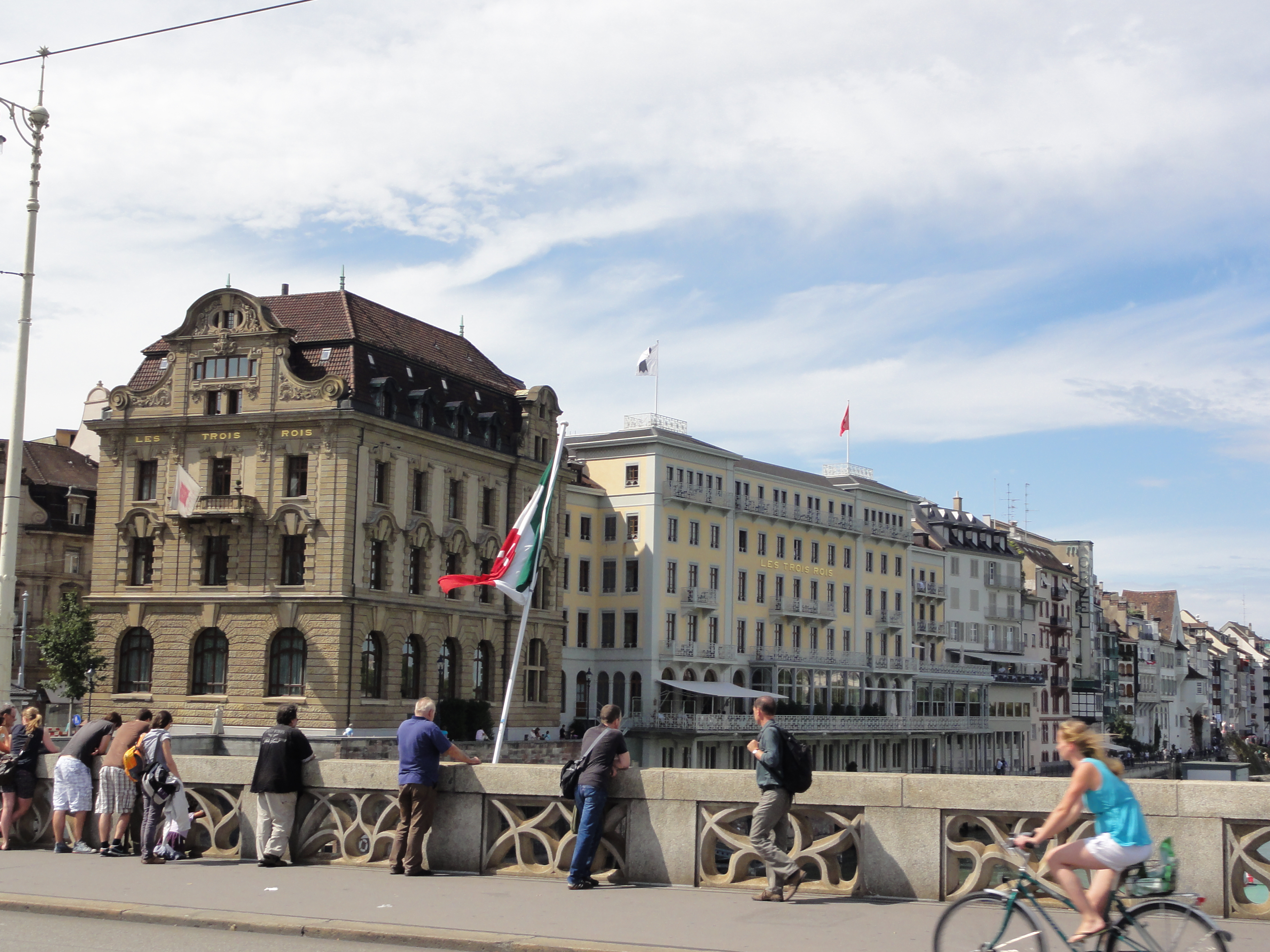
- Hôtel Les Trois Rois in 2012

- Location within Switzerland

General information
- Location: Basel, BS, Switzerland
- Coordinates: 47°33′37.6″N 7°35′15.6″E
- Opening: 1681 (with present name)
- Owner: Thomas Straumann

Design and construction
- Architects: Amadeus Merian (1844 rebuild); Christian Lang (2006 renovations)

Website
- lestroisrois.com/Grand-Hotel-Les-Trois-Rois.377+M5e34df5a01a.0.html

Grand Hôtel Les Trois Rois (Hotel of the Three Kings) in Basel, until 1986 usually identified by its German-language name, Hotel Drei Könige, is often cited as one of Switzerland's oldest hotels. It is located on the left bank of the Rhine, a few paces downstream of the city's first bridge across the river.

== Early history ==
Before the railways were built, the Rhine was the most important trade artery in western Europe, and Basel was the principal terminal point at its southern end. Beside the transshipment jetties where merchandise was off-loaded from the boats on the northeast bank of the river, there was already a guest house, identified in 1255 as "domus zem blumen in vico crucis" ("House of Flowers at the Cross Street"), which was probably built a decade or so after the ferry crossings of the river were complemented at this point by a road bridge. However, the guest house and adjacent buildings had to be demolished after the 1356 earthquake.

The first surviving record of a hotel on this site with its modern name dates from 1681, when the "Drei Könige" Inn was identified as a place where itinerant merchants lodged. The name "Drei Könige" means "Three Kings" and is a common name for city hotels in Switzerland and southern Germany. It is thought to be a reference to the Magi (popularly, "Three Kings"), who visited Jesus shortly after his birth. The Magi, like the merchants who stayed overnight in medieval hotels, were notable for the precious merchandise they carried with them.

In 1841–42, the entire site was acquired by Johann Jakob Senn, hitherto a successful master tailor who foresaw possibilities for a massive expansion in leisure travel that would follow from the revolutions in transportation brought about by the river steamer and the coming of the railways. Senn demolished the hotel and had it rebuilt in a much more luxurious style, employing the fashionable Basel architect Amadeus Merian to design what would later be seen as an early example of Belle Époque architecture. The rebuilt hotel reopened on 16 February 1844. From then on, it would present itself as a "Grand Hotel", with a guest list that included many leading figures from the worlds of politics and the arts.

== Later history ==
In 1915, the southern block of the hotel building was sold to the Basler Kantonalbank and renovated accordingly. Twenty-three years later, in 1938, the bankers moved out and the building became the City Tourist Information Office. In 2004, the hotel, together with the block that had been separated and sold to the bank in 1915, was acquired by entrepreneur and dental implants magnate Thomas Straumann. The hotel was closed for two years while it was comprehensively rebuilt, incorporating the southern block and with a view to recapturing as much as possible the state of the 1844 original, insofar as this was possible without abandoning the more modern luxury features considered appropriate for the 21st century. The hotel reopened on 20 March 2006. In 2012, Straumann announced that he was looking for a buyer for the hotel. A suitable buyer had still not been found two years later, and in December 2014 it was announced that the hotel was no longer for sale.

== Celebrity clientele ==
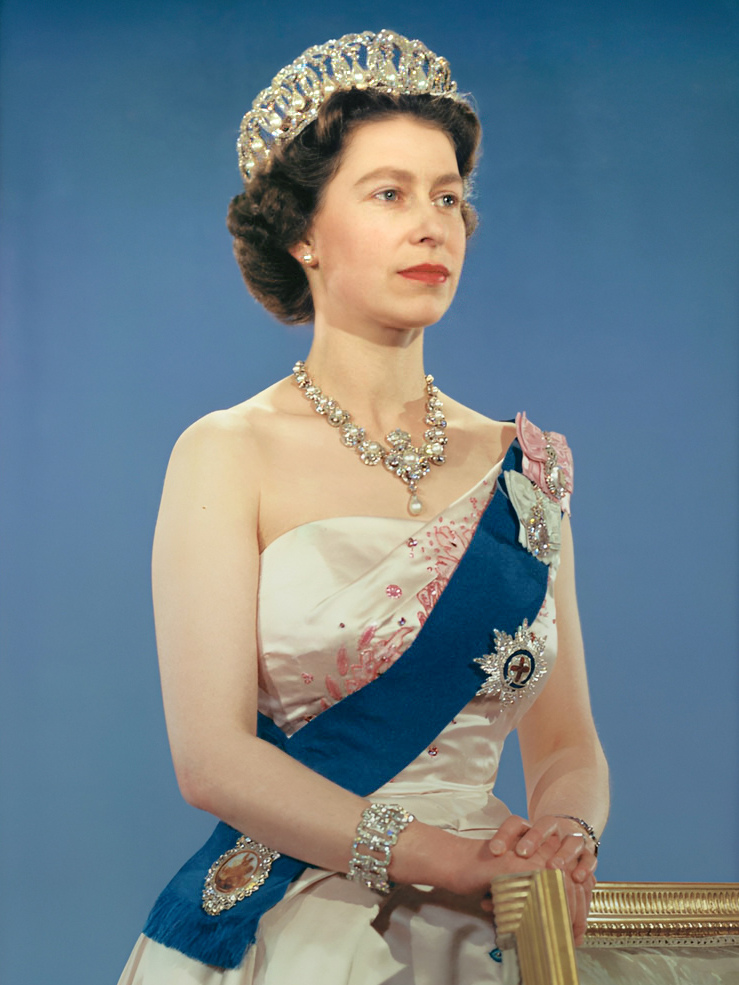
On 1 May 1980, Queen Elizabeth II and her husband Prince Philip, Duke of Edinburgh, were guests at the Grand Hôtel Les Trois Rois, as part of their visit to the horticultural exhibition Grün 80 in Basel.

Political leaders who have stayed at the hotel include Willy Brandt, Helmut Schmidt, Valéry Giscard d'Estaing, and the Dalai Lama. Heads of state claimed as guests include King Farouk of Egypt and Queen Elizabeth II. In 1798 Napoleon Bonaparte had a business lunch here with Basel officials "to discuss French-Swiss relations". A more recent guest was Britain's General Montgomery. Guests from the worlds of the arts and literature have included Voltaire, Jean-Paul Sartre, Charles Dickens, Herbert von Karajan, Duke Ellington, and Marc Chagall. Theodor Herzl stayed at the hotel in August 1897 while attending the First Zionist Congress. The American scientist and philosopher Charles S. Peirce stayed there in January 1870.

The composer and conductor Pierre Boulez was awakened by police at six in the morning in his room at the Hotel Les Trois Rois late in 2001; the officers confiscated his passport and disappeared. In 1967, Boulez had given an interview to Der Spiegel in which he said that "the opera houses should be blown up". The law enforcement officials picked up on it during a routine check of hotel guest registrations. The passport was returned after a few hours.

=== From the Grand Hôtel Les Trois Rois back to the Royal Court of Versailles ===
On 20 July 1789, Jacques Necker, the former finance minister of King Louis XVI, arrived at the Grand Hôtel Les Trois Rois with a large entourage, following his dismissal on 11 July by the king. After being dismissed by the king, Jacques Necker stopped in Basel on his way to his country estate, the Château de Coppet. However, just one day later, on 21 July, a royal courier delivered a letter to Jacques Necker from the king, in which the king asked Necker to return to his service as finance minister. Necker accepted the king's request in a letter dated 23 July and returned to Versailles, where he arrived on 29 July. A decision that was not without consequences for the French Revolution.

== See also ==
- List of hotels in Switzerland
- Tourism in Switzerland
