= La Mère Catherine =

Restaurant in Paris, France

Coordinates: 48.8867°N 2.3408°E

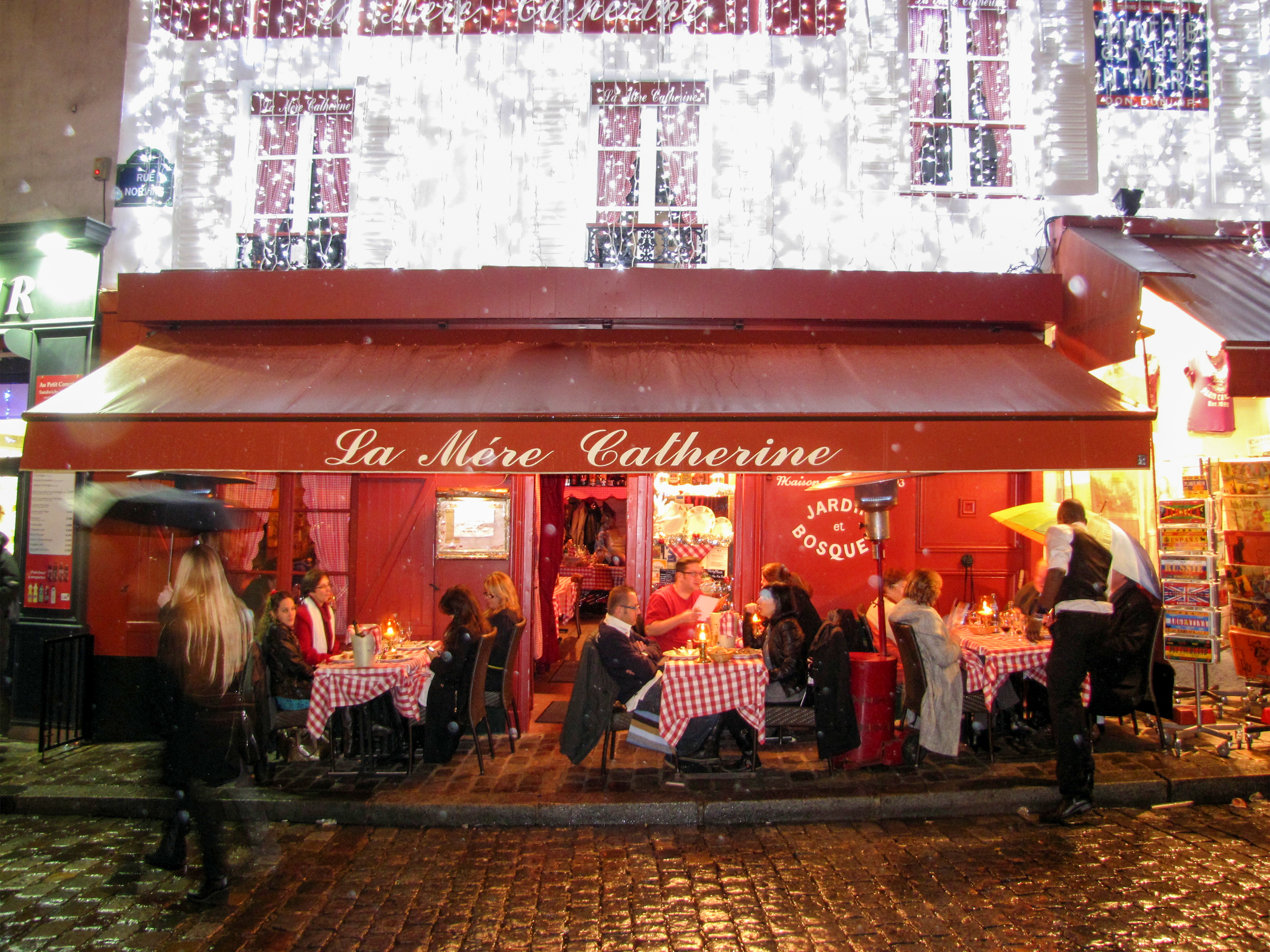
La Mère Catherine

La Mère Catherine (French pronunciation: [la mɛʁ katʁin]) is a brasserie in the 18th arrondissement of Paris, France. It is the oldest still-operating restaurant at the Place du Tertre. It is situated in a building that previously served as the church presbytery of Saint-Pierre de Montmartre.

== History ==
Founded in 1793, it is one of the oldest restaurants in Paris. A plaque at its entrance gives a folk etymology of the word "bistro": that on March 30, 1814, while a group of Russian soldiers were dining at Mère Catherine, they asked for drinks, bystro (Cyrillic: быстро; Russian: "quickly"). Thereafter, "bistro" became a description of a restaurant where an individual could get food or drink quickly. In the early twentieth century, the bistro was managed by Mr. Lemoine and owned by Père Labille. During the French Revolution, Georges Danton met his disciples at Mère Catherine. During the Nazi occupation of Paris, 1941–1944, Ernst Jünger was a patron. At one time, guests could enjoy a game of billiards at Mère Catherine; an old postcard depicts billiards players posing in front of the bar. Today, the restaurant is frequented mostly by tourists.

== Architecture and fittings ==
The interior is characterized by dark wood walls, terra cotta tiles, and exposed wooden ceiling beams. It is furnished with large crocks, framed oil paintings of Montmartre landmarks, wooden chairs, and red-and-white checked linens.
