= Brasserie =

Type of French restaurant with a relaxed setting

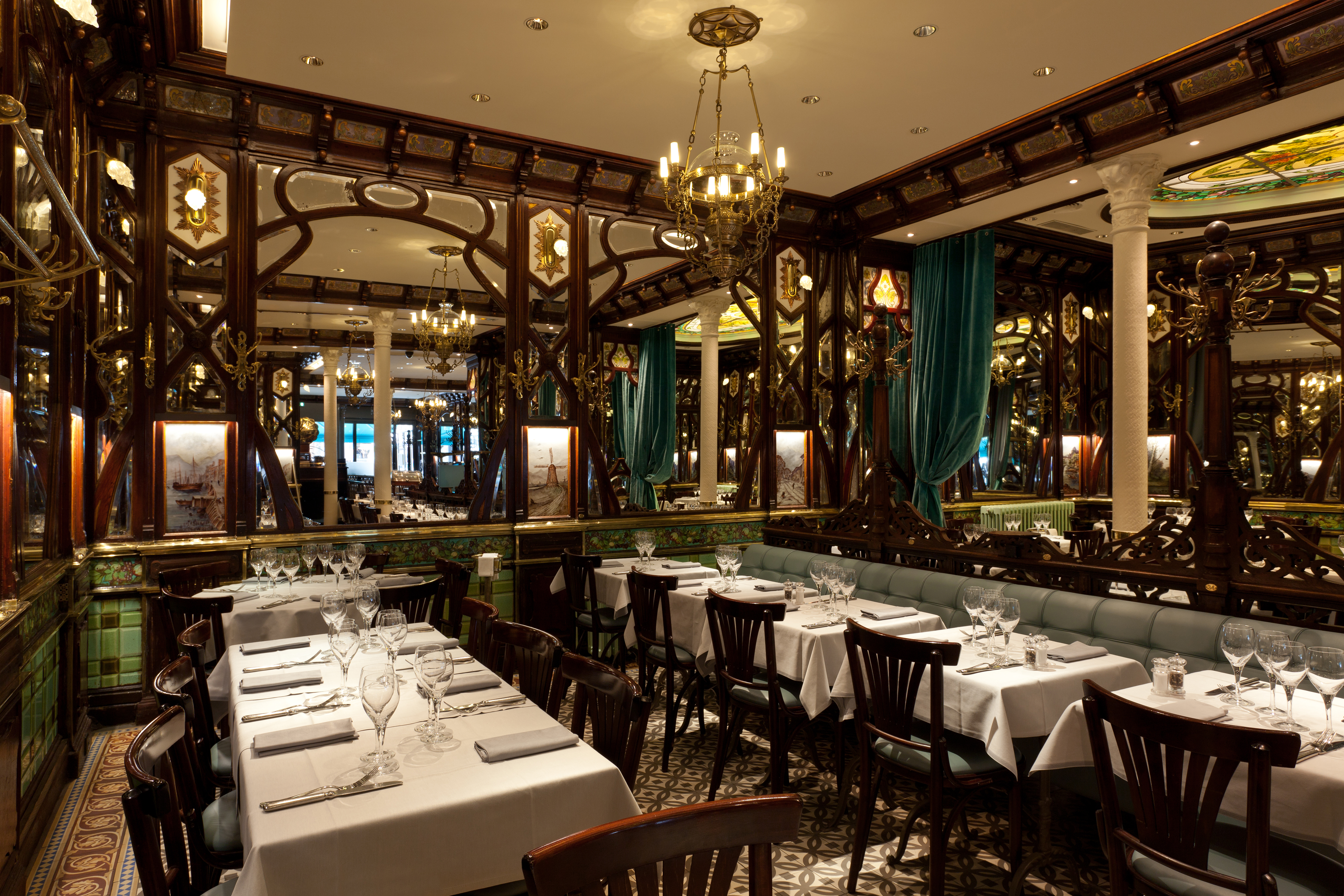
The interior of Le Vagenende on Boulevard Saint-Germain in Paris

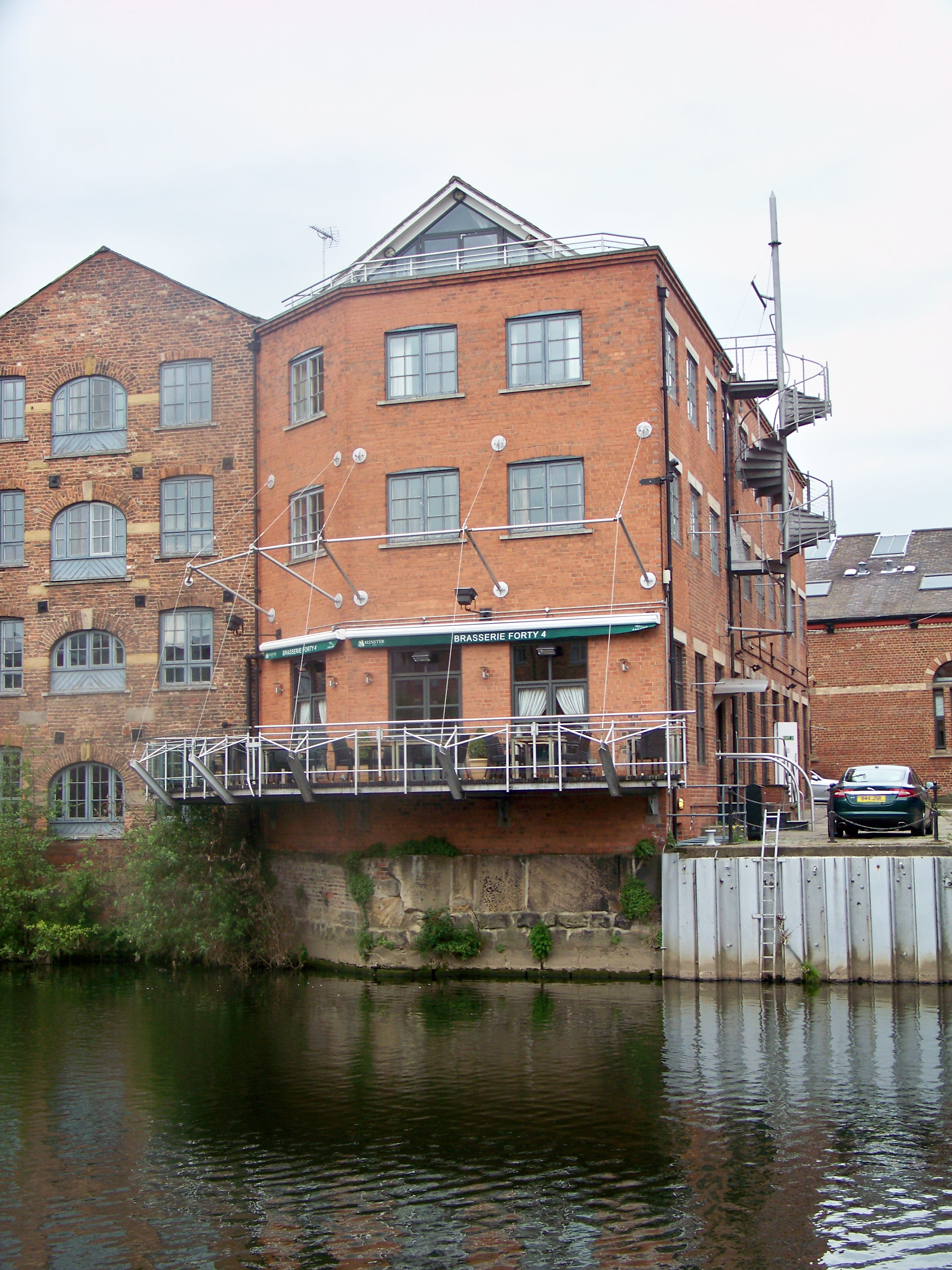
A riverside brasserie in Leeds, England

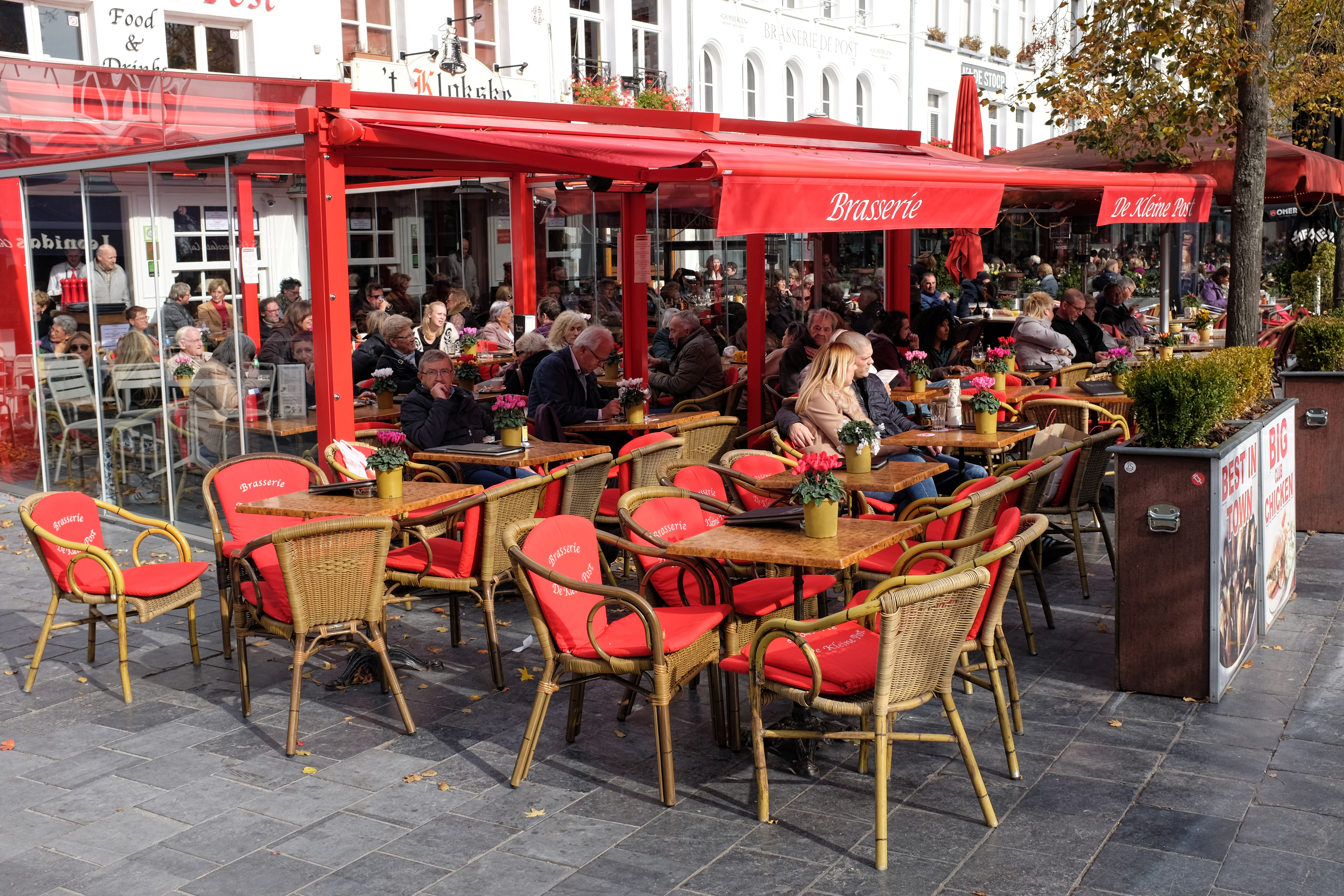
The terrace of a brasserie on Groenplaats, Antwerp, Belgium

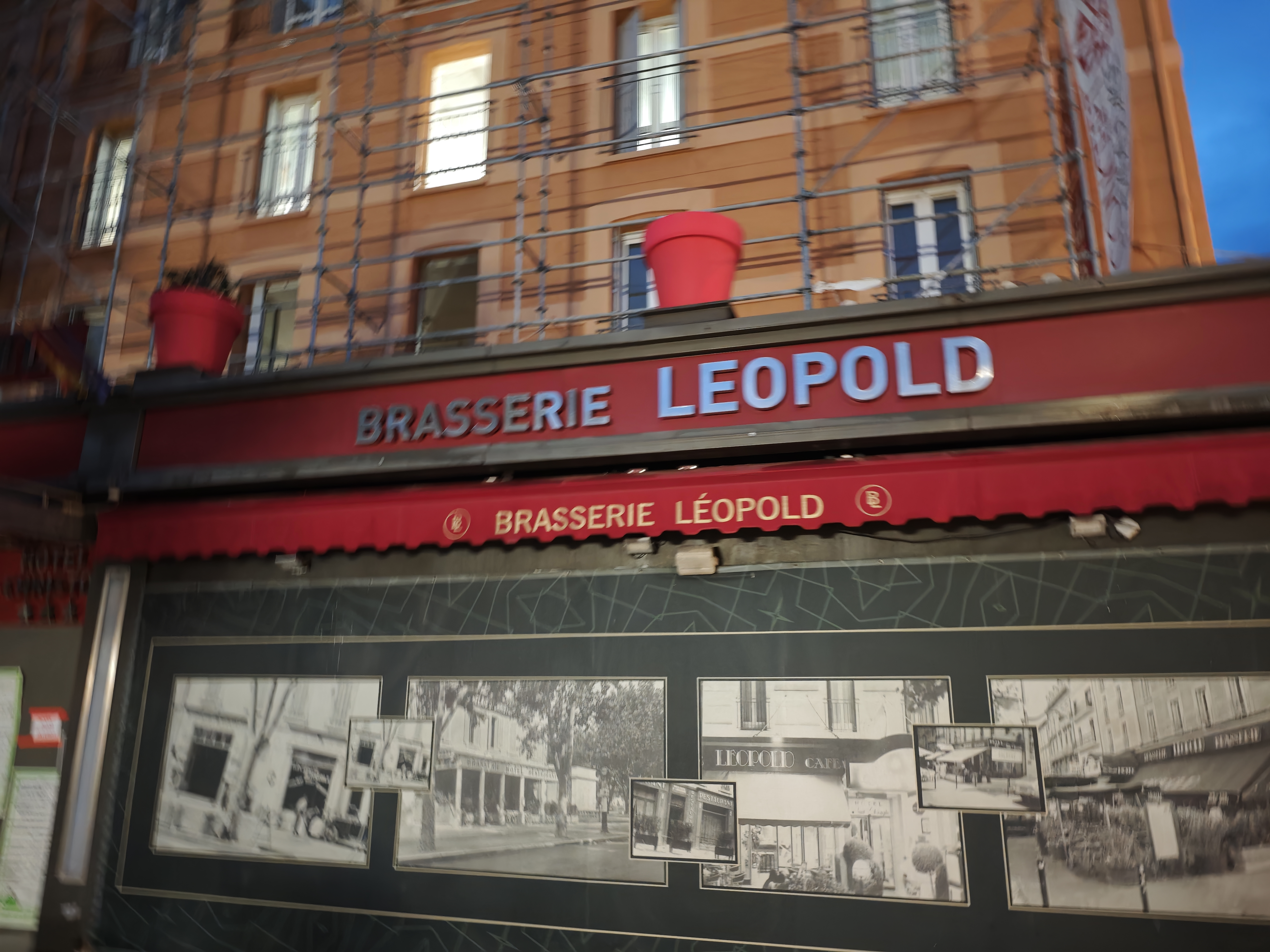
Brasserie Léopold in Aix-en-Provence

In France, Belgium, and parts of the Francophone world, a brasserie (pronounced [bʁas(ə)ʁi]) is a type of French restaurant with a relaxed setting that serves dishes and other meals.

The word brasserie is French for "brewery" and, by extension, "the brewing business". Although most brasseries still serve a large selection of beers, most of them offer a wider choice of beverages such as wines and liquors. A brasserie can be expected to have professional service, printed menus, and traditionally white linen—unlike a bistro which may have none of these. Typically a brasserie is open every day and serves the same menu, generally composed of a few traditional French dishes, all day. A classic example of a brasserie dish is steak frites.

== Etymology ==
The term brasserie is French for "brewery", from Middle French brasser "to brew", from Old French bracier, from Vulgar Latin braciare, of Celtic origin; braxator = Latin for brewer. Its first usage in English was in 1864.

In 1901 Chambers's Twentieth Century Dictionary of the English Language defined "brasserie" as "in France, any beer-garden or saloon". In 2000 The New Penguin English Dictionary included this definition of "brasserie": "a small informal French-style restaurant".

== Parisian examples ==
Amongst the most renowned places considered to be brasseries, Bouillon Chartier is probably the most emblematic. Located in the 9th arrondissement in Paris, it was opened in 1896 by the brothers Frédéric and Camille Chartier. The brand soon expanded to over ten brasseries in Paris; three remain today: the founding location on Rue du Faubourg-Montmartre, on Boulevard du Montparnasse in the 6th arrondissement, and on Rue du 8-Mai-1945 in the 10th arrondissement. Former locations still operating include

- Café Procope in the 6th arrondissement, first opened in 1686, becoming a revolutionary meeting place during the French Revolution;
- Bouillon Julien in the 10th arrondissement, noted for its Art Nouveau interior;
- Bouillon Racine in the 6th arrondissement, also noted for its Art Nouveau interior, attracting students and staff of Sorbonne University nearby;
- Le Vagenende, on Boulevard Saint-Germain in the 6th arrondissement, also noted for its Art Nouveau interior.

To this day, both locals and tourists visit the Bouillon Chartier establishments, decorated in the Belle Époque style, to eat traditional and cheap dishes.

The Closerie des Lilas, located in the 6th arrondissement, opened in 1847 and has been visited by many creatives such as Pablo Picasso, Jean-Paul Sartre, Oscar Wilde, Louis Aragon, Ernest Hemingway, Émile Zola, Paul Cézanne, and F. Scott Fitzgerald.

La Mère Catherine, a brasserie founded in 1793, is the oldest still-operating restaurant at the Place du Tertre in Montmartre. The Grand Café des Capucines, opened in 1875 on the Boulevard des Capucines in the 9th arrondissement, soon became a well-known place for dinner after shows at the Opéra Garnier nearby.

== See also ==
- Gastropub
- Café
- Parisian café
- Restaurant
