= Cuisine of Réunion =

Culinary traditions of Réunion

Gastronomy of la Réunion
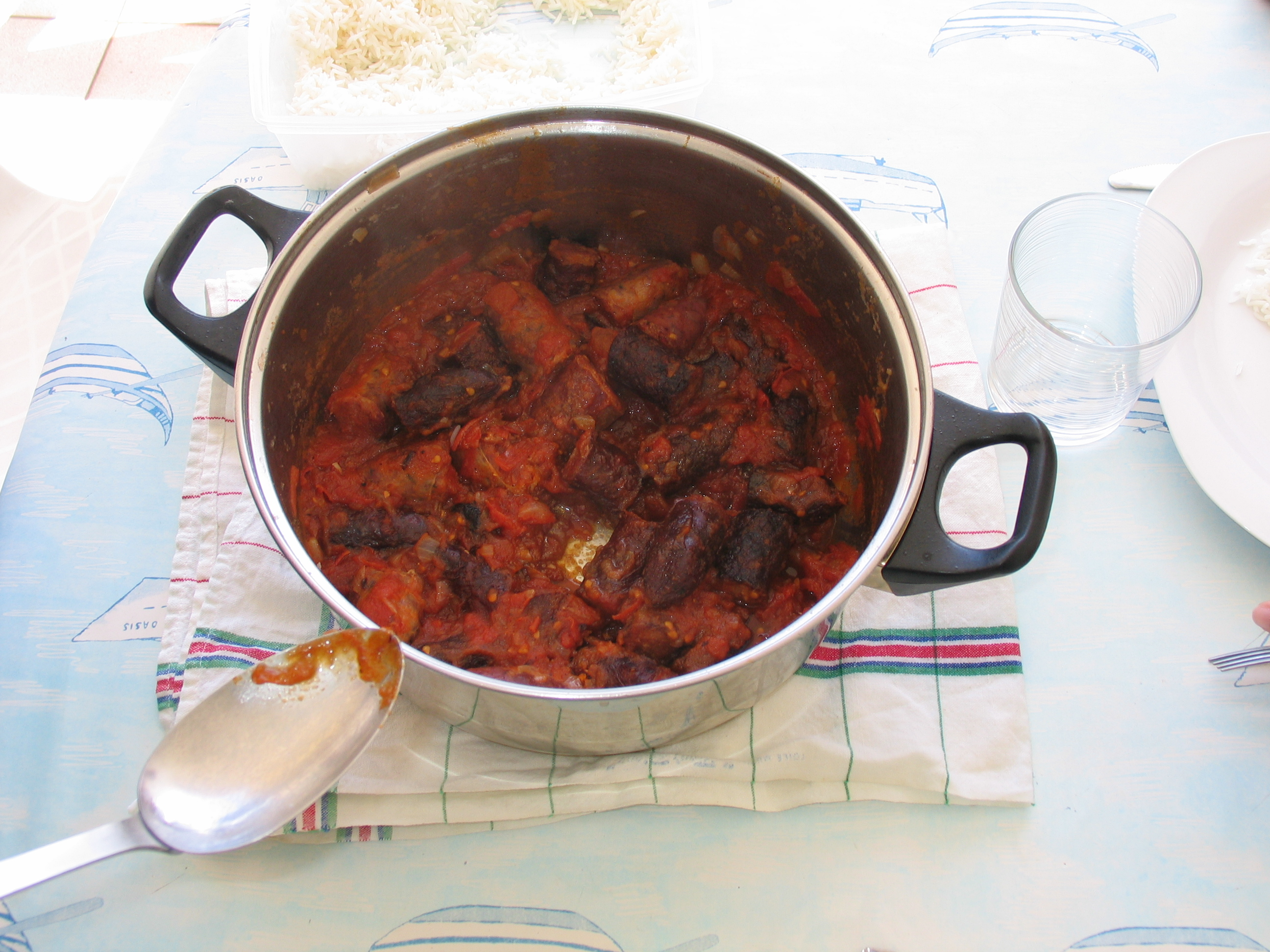
- salchichas Rogail
- Alternative names: Cuisine réunionnaise
- Place of origin: Réunion France
- Associated cuisine: French cuisine

The Creole cuisine of Réunion is the food, culinary technique and typical dishes of the island of Réunion, France's dependency in the Indian Ocean. It is identified as Creole cuisine (in French, Créole) because it is a mixture of eating habits and colonial culinary customs with native ingredients. It is strongly influenced by Malagasy cuisine (from Madagascar), as well as other cuisines from East Africa. It also incorporates elements of French cuisine, due to colonization, as well as more recently Indian and Chinese, brought by Indian and Chinese immigrants respectively. The Réunion diet is naturally spicy, flavorful, and relatively consistent.

== Appetizers ==
In La Reunion, the aperitif (appetizer) or entrée plays an important role as an integral part of a meal. Fries are especially popular, although there are notable exceptions such as steamed bouchons. Some typical snacks are:

- Samosas, called samoussas, a fried dumpling with a multitude of different fillings typical of the Middle East. Cheese, chicken, fish and potato are very popular, but there are also varieties like pizza, or sweet samoussas with chocolate and banana or pineapple.
- The bonbon piment ("bonbon enchilado"), fried salty and spicy cookies, typically made of lima beans or other legumes, herbs and spices like chili and cumin.
- The bouchon, a dumpling of Chinese origin and stuffed with minced meat. They are served with siaw (soy sauce). Also typical is the bouchon sandwich.
- Pain bouchon
- Stuffed pepper peanuts, a simple popular snack
- Chicken croquette

== Dishes ==
Always accompanied by white rice, the most common dishes are cari (a local version of the Indian curry), rougail and jugged meats (civets in French). Curry consists of a base of onion, garlic and spices such as turmeric (called safran péï on the island) and masalé (the local version of garam masala), in which fish, meat, eggs, and tomato are cooked. Dishes can also be optionally flavored with ginger. Combava zest and curry leaf (called kaloupilé) are also very popular. Chop suey (rice, not pasta) and other Asian dishes like pork with pineapple are also very common.

It is almost always served with some type of legume (grains), such as broad beans, locust beans or the famous lentils from Cilaos, for example, but also with cooked vegetables (brèdes) or raw, such as bleda (also called yerba de Pará, paracres or morning bleda).

Other common garnishes are pickles (called achard de legumes, derived from the Indian achaar; often made with cabbage, carrots and green beans or palm hearts and spiced with garlic, chili, cumin, turmeric, ginger and vinegar), rougail (a mixture of chopped tomato, onion, chili, and ginger) or fresh tomatoes, aubergines, or green mango, all highly seasoned.

A popular dish is rougail saucisses, made with rougail chicken or pork sausage, a tomato sauce, chili, spices, and ginger. It will preferably be accompanied by white or zembrocal rice (rice cooked with turmeric, which incorporates red beans or peas).

In general, vegetarian dishes are rare in the Reunion diet, although there are choices, such as gratin de chouchou (chayote gratin). Various kinds of poultry are consumed. Although there are others; one of the local specialties is the civet de tenrec. The traditional way of preserving meat is boucanage, and cooking is done in cast iron pots. Traditionally, the main course was also prepared in the patio, over a wood fire, or in a small out-of-home unit, called the boucan. Then it was eaten on a banana leaf and often eaten by hand.

Cari tangue

While the people of Réunion generally have similar lifestyles and eating habits, there are variations among the population's different ethnic and religious communities. For instance, Réunion Muslims follow Islamic dietary law, abstaining from pork and, consequently, not consuming rougail saucisse. However, they do share more recipes with the neighboring Mauritius than other Réunionais groups, including dishes like the briani. The Petit blancs des hauts, a Réunion ethnic group traditionally considered to be lower-class, consume small pickles or curry spices, unlike malbares (Indian community).

== Drinks ==
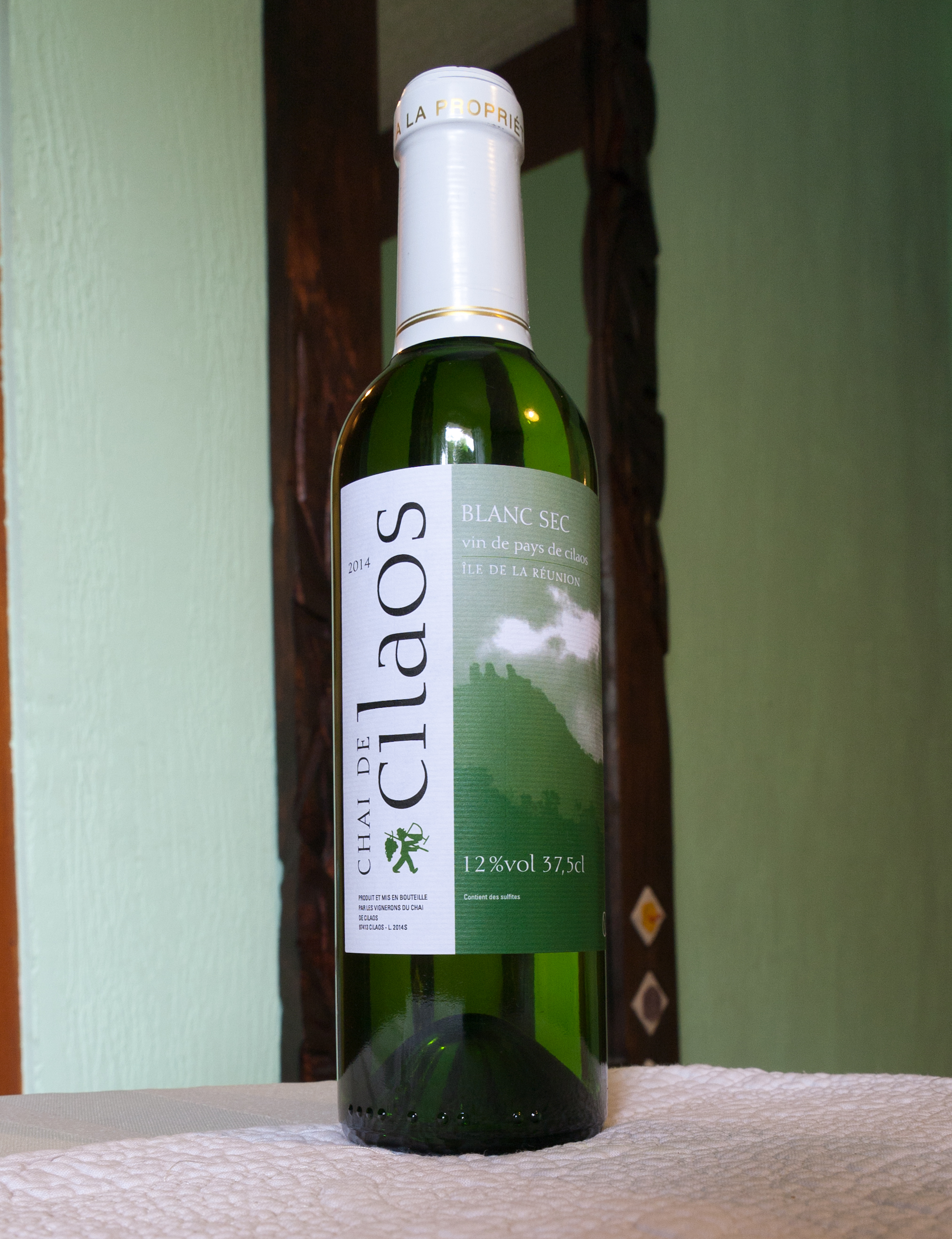
Wine of Cilaos

An aperitif or snack is usually accompanied by a punch (blow) or an "arranged rum" (rhum arrangé). It is a white rum that usually carries some fruit (such as lychee, mango, or pineapple), leaves, and seeds macerated for weeks. It is taken at any time of the day, even in the morning.

Another typical drink is tamarind syrup. The sodas made from pineapple, lychee, lemon, and other fruits grown on the island are also popular, although sometimes they are replaced by international drinks.

In Réunion a wine is produced, the Cilaos. It is red, white or rosé and the dominant varieties are pinot noir, malbec and chenin. It comes from Cilaos, in the mountainous area of the island and its production is very low (14 ha).

The Brasseries de Bourbon, which is now owned by Heineken, is the only major producer of beer. Bourbon beer is locally known as Dodo, and around the island, the slogan "la Dodo lé la” (the dodo is here) is commonly painted on snack shops. Other popular beers include Phoenix from Mauritius and Kronenbourg 1664.

== Desserts ==
Seasonal fruits are a very common and simple dessert: in the summer mangoes, lychees, longans and Victoria-type pineapple, a sweet variety from nearby Mauritius; in winter, goyaviers (small guavas, that are an invasive plant in much of Réunion’s forests).

As for pastries, several local cookies that are very popular, including the bonbon la rouroute ("arrowroot bonbon"), the "bonbon tie", and the bonbon honey ("honey bonbon").

In pastry, the gâteau patate ("potato pie"), the gâteau ti'son (corn pie), the seasonal fruit tart, the beignets de bananes ("banana fritters") are famous. Starch cakes, cassava, yams, and sweet potatoes are also common.

== Special occasions ==
For the New Year, typical pâté créole (Creole pate), whose filling is made of pork curry, called godivo, the dough is a mixture of curry sauce with flour and lard, and flavored with turmeric, accompanied by a little anise liqueur.
