= Le Chateaubriand =

Restaurant in Paris, France

Coordinates: 48.8693°N 2.3713°E

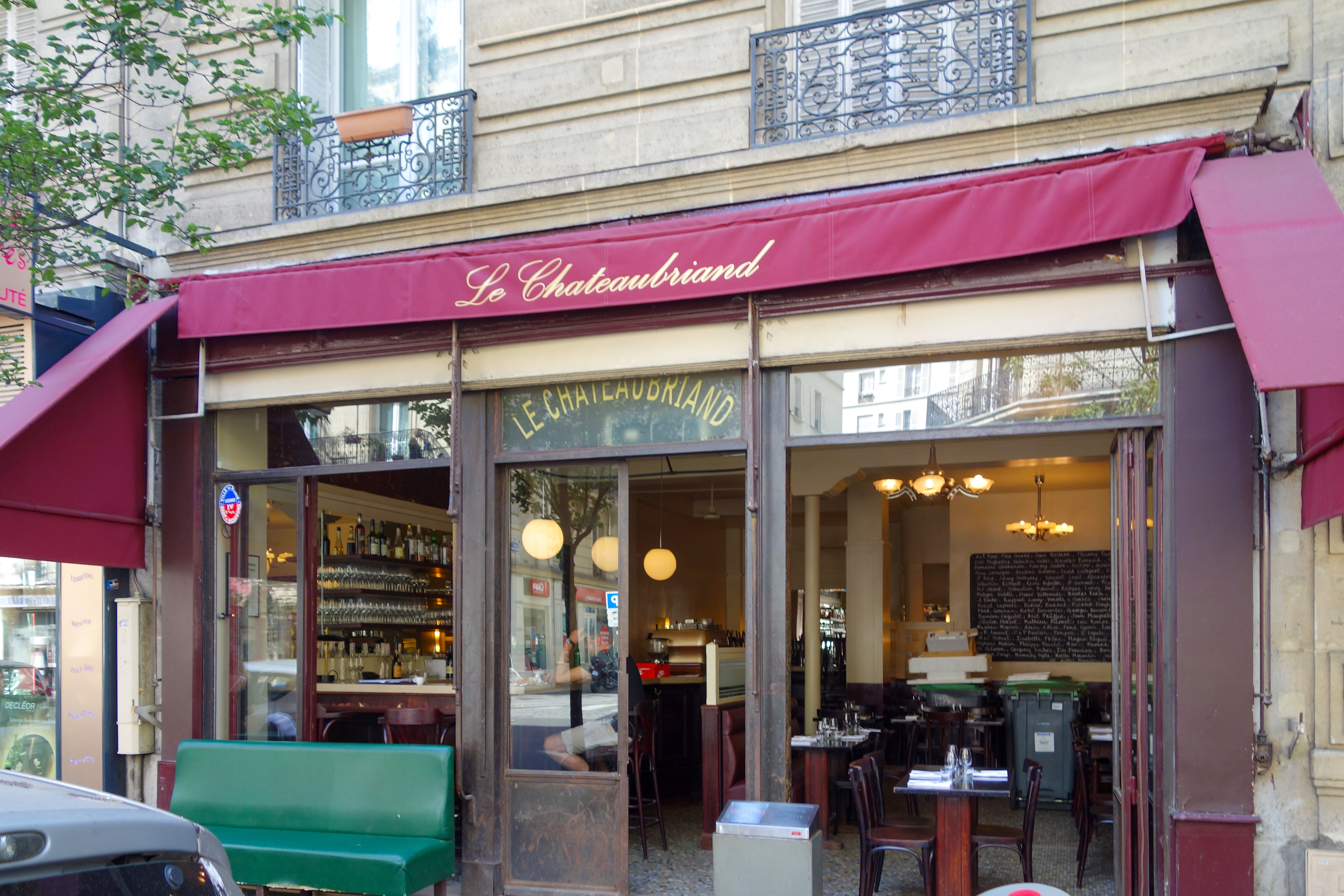
Le Chateaubriand

Le Chateaubriand (French pronunciation: [lə ʃɑtobʁijɑ̃]) is a restaurant on Avenue Parmentier in Paris, France. Its chef is Iñaki Aizpitarte. Le Chateaubriand eschews traditional Parisian À la carte menus in favor of prix fixe offerings, paired with wines which include biodynamic and organic vintages from South Africa, the United States, Georgia, and France (examples of wine offerings include a Saumur blanc, a Roussillon red, a Volnay, a Meursault, and a Côte-Rôtie).

In 2008 Le Chateaubriand was selected as the Breakthrough Restaurant in the annual Restaurant magazine poll of chefs and critics. In the 2009 poll, it was voted the 40th best restaurant in the world. In the 2010 poll, it was voted the 11th best restaurant in the world. Most recently, it has climbed into the top 10, ranking in at 9th in 2011.
