= Lapérouse (restaurant) =

Restaurant in Paris, France

Coordinates: 48.8551°N 2.3416°E

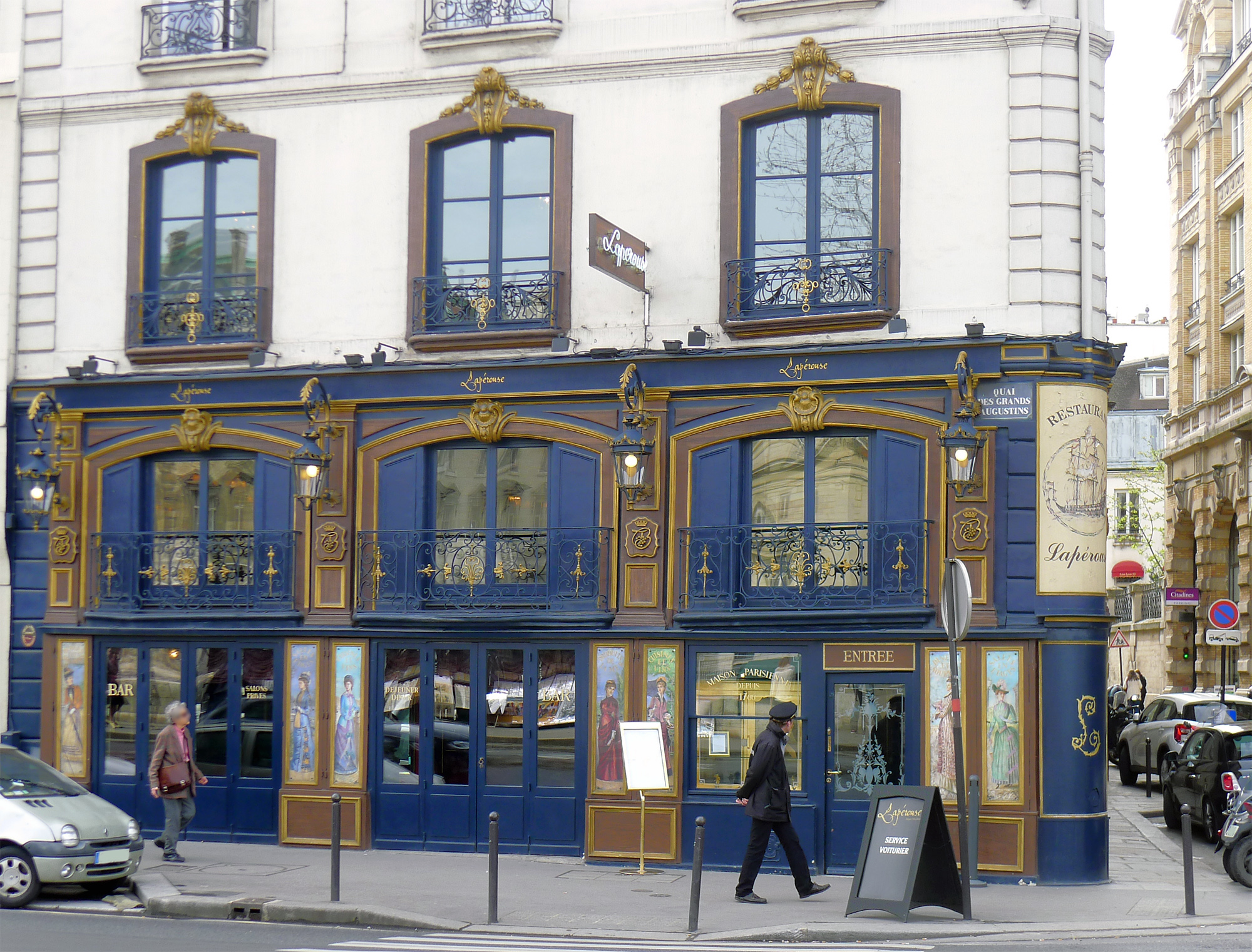
Restaurant Lapérouse

Lapérouse is a restaurant located at 51 Quai des Grands Augustins in 6th arrondissement of Paris, France. Established in 1766, the restaurant was awarded the prestigious 3 Michelin stars between 1933 and 1968, although it was briefly 2 stars from 1949 to 1951. The Michelin Guide downgraded it back to two stars in 1969.

== See also ==
- List of Michelin starred restaurants
