= Nicolas Sale =

French chef

- Born: 29 July 1972 (age 52); Paris, France
- Culinary career
- Rating(s): Michelin stars
- Current restaurant(s): La Table de l'Espadon Le Jardin de l'Espadon (Hôtel Ritz Paris)

Nicolas Sale (born 29 July 1972) is a French chef. He is the chef of the two gastronomic restaurants of the Hôtel Ritz Paris: La Table de l'Espadon (2 Michelin stars) and Le Jardin de l'Espadon (1 Michelin star). He was named "Chef of the Year" in 2017.

== Life and career ==
=== Early life and education ===
Nicolas Sale was born rue des Martyrs in the 9th arrondissement of Paris, underneath the butte Montmartre. He grew up in Aubervilliers and Pantin. He spent his holiday at the farm of his grandparents, near Molières and Château-Gontier in the department of Mayenne and developed an interest for cooking. He dreamt of becoming a cyclist, but after middle school, he turned by default into a CAP in cooking at the Lycée Hôtelier Eugénie-Cotton in Montreuil, in which he did his training course with Freddy Faverot and Pascal de Pericot at the Écurie in Villemomble. He pursued his training course in CFA Médéric at the École hôtelière de Paris, working with Jean-Claude Meunier at Comme chez soi.

=== Early career in restaurants ===
He began his career as a cooking assistant at the Vaudeville, a Parisian brasserie and then became a cooking assistant at the Pavillon Royal with David Frémondière, where he discovered the gastronomic cuisine. He stayed there for two years and at age 22 became a cooking assistant at the entries and desserts in his first Michelin starred restaurant Les Magnolias at Le Perreux-sur-Marne. He then became a cooking assistant at the garde manger with José Martinez at the Maison Blanche. After six months, he became chef de partie at the fish service but refused to become a sous-chef when the chef suggested him, feeling not ready. He then went with Alain Senderens and Bertrand Guéneron at the Lucas Carlton (3 Michelin stars), where after one year he became a sauce chef. He then became an external chef with Jean-Pierre Biffi at the Potel & Chabot and as a chef de partie for Pierre Gagnaire.

=== Career in palaces ===
Nicolas Sale then worked as an executive chef with Philippe Legendre at the George V, and became the sous-chef of Marc MEurand at Le Meurice, where he stayed for two years. In 2003, he became for the first time chef at the Hyatt Paris-Madeleine. In 2006, he joined the Monte Cristo at the Hôtel du Castellet where he obtained one Michelin star in 2007 at age 34. In 2010, he went to Antibes at the Maison du Pêcheur of the Beach Hôtel, and the same year at Courchevel, where he kept the Michelin star at the Kilimandjaro before obtaining a second one in 2013 with Glenn Viel. The same year, Nicolas Sale also became the executive chef of the K2 Palace where he obtained one Michelin star for the restaurant Le Kintessence, and later a second one.

In 2015, Nicolas Sale returned to Paris to join the kitchens of the Hôtel Ritz Paris, held until their closing in 2012 by Michel Roth. He became the tenth chef of the Ritz, where the first one was Auguste Escoffier. The restaurants La Table de l'Espadon and Les Jardins de l'Espadon re-opened in June 2016. In January 2017, Nicolas Sale obtained two Michelin stars for La Table de l'Espadon and one Michelin star for Les Jardins de l'Espadon. The same year, he was elected "Chef of the Year" by the restaurant professionals, election organized by the magazine Le Chef.
