= Éric Briffard =

French chef

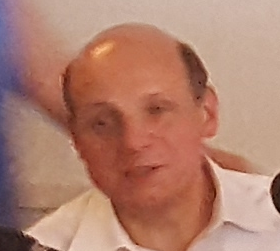
- Born: 30 November 1961 (age 64); Auxerre, Yonne, France
- Culinary career
- Rating: Michelin stars
- Previous restaurant: Le Cinq (Paris)

Éric Briffard (French pronunciation: [eʁik bʁifaʁ]; born 30 November 1961) is a French chef. He is the executive chef and director of the Culinary Arts at the school Le Cordon Bleu since January 2016.

== Career ==
Éric Briffard began his career at 19 as a cooking assistant at the Concorde Lafayette, and then at the restaurant Relais Saint Fiacre in Appoigny in 1976.

In 1988, he went to Japan for about a year and joined the restaurant Palazzo Royal Park Hotel.

In 1990, he was hired as a sous-chef of Joël Robuchon at the restaurant Jamin in Paris.

In 1994, he obtained the title of Meilleur Ouvrier de France, delivered by François Mitterrand at the Palais de l'Élysée.

In 2004, he obtained a second Michelin star at the Plaza Athénée in Paris, and then joined the restaurant Les Élysées du Vernet.

He joined in 2008 the restaurant Le Cinq (2 stars at the Guide Michelin) at the Hotel George V in Paris. In October 2014, he left the restaurant and was replaced by chef Christian Le Squer.

In January 2016, he joined the cooking school Le Cordon Bleu as the executive chef and director of the Culinary Arts.
