= Jay Rayner's review of Le Cinq =

2017 restaurant review

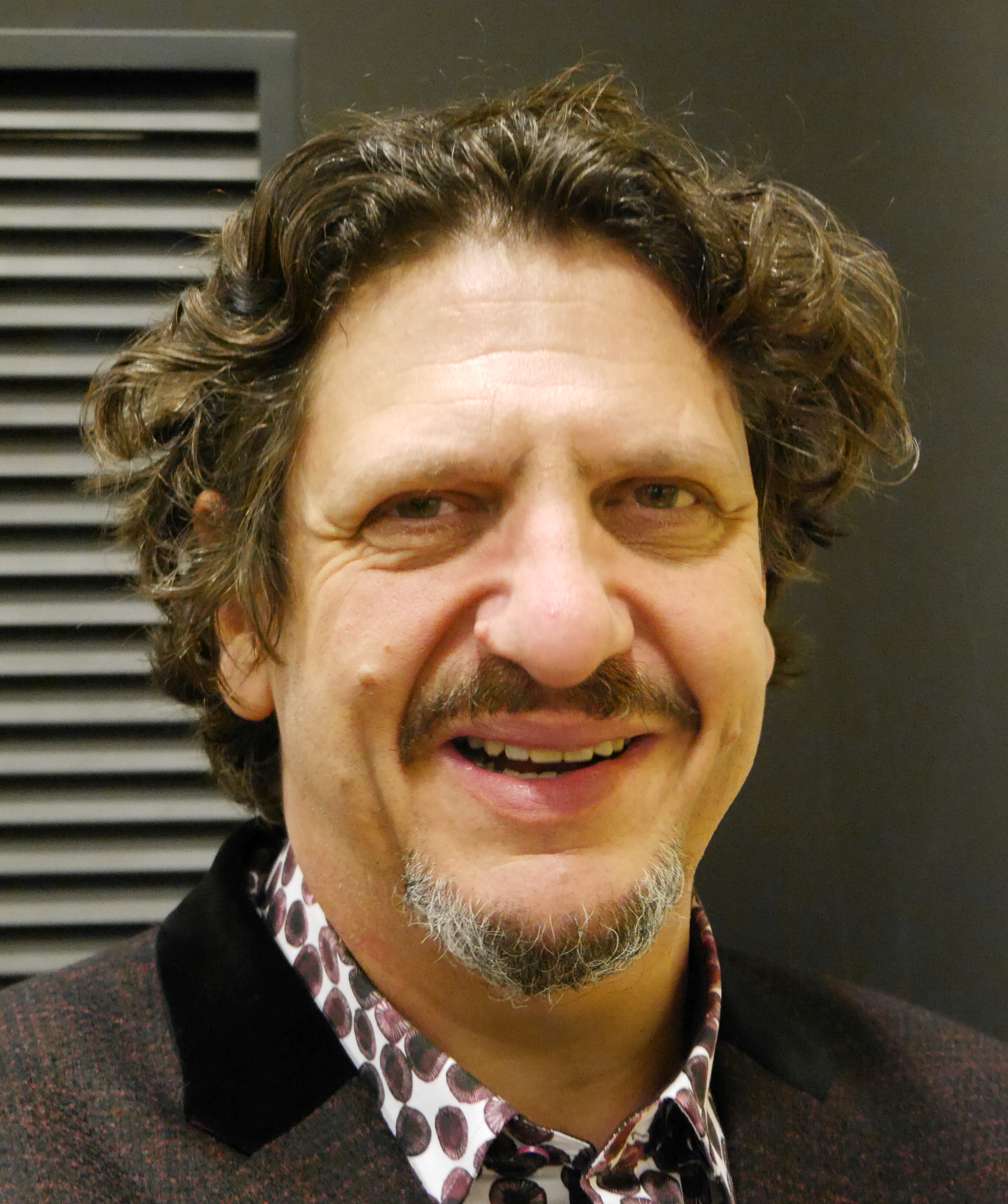
Rayner in 2019

On 9 April 2017, the British newspaper The Observer published an article by Jay Rayner, its restaurant critic, describing a meal for two at Le Cinq, a luxury restaurant in Paris. Rayner visited with the intention of writing an observational piece on how expensive some restaurants were, as he had been irritated by people complaining about the cost of eating out. The review described his experience as by far the worst of his 18-year career, exacerbated by the earnestness of the waitstaff. The piece went viral and was praised by writers from Vox and Vice, though many reviewers from French outlets criticised Rayner. The food website Eater listed the review on their Best Bad Restaurant Reviews of 2017 listicle.

== History ==
Jay Rayner became The Observer's restaurant critic in 1999; by April 2017, his reviews for them were averaging 60,000 online views. After tiring of people complaining about the cost of eating out, he visited Le Cinq, a three-Michelin-star restaurant in the luxury Hotel George V in Paris, with the intention of writing an observational piece on how expensive some restaurants were. His review described the restaurant as decorated in "various shades of taupe, biscuit and fuck you", with thick carpet to "muffle the screams", and featured press shots supplied by the restaurant throughout as the restaurant had not allowed The Observer to photograph their food. According to his review, what Rayner ate included the following:

- A brioche, which he complimented
- A tart filled with whipped chicken liver mousse
- Scallops that tasted like iodine
- A spherification that tasted of "stale air with a tinge of ginger" and reminded him of a "Barbie-sized silicone breast implant" and his companion of an abandoned condom in a dusty greengrocer's
- A hollowed out passionfruit with bitter watercress purée that made his lips purse "like a cat's arse that's brushed against nettles"
- Gratinated onions that were "mostly black, like nightmares, and sticky, like the floor at a teenager's party"
- Pigeon requested medium but severely undercooked
- Frozen chocolate mousse cigars wrapped in tuile draped in a blister-like flap of milk skin
- A cheesecake with frozen parsley powder he described as one of the worst things he had ever eaten and subsequently had removed from his bill
- Mint tea and kouign-amann that had been "burnt around the edges"

Jayner's meal cost €600. He described it as "by far the worst restaurant experience I have endured in my 18 years in this job", exacerbated by the earnestness of the waitstaff, and wrote that he had been left with such unpleasant memories he would be lucky to forget them. He also criticised the restaurant for giving his female companion a menu without prices and ended the review with several iPhone pictures of what he ate, which also appeared on his website.

Rayner's review went viral and received around 3,000 comments within three days; the extra traffic caused his website to crash. By 17 May, the review had been viewed more than 2,000,000 times and he had been dubbed "the world's most feared food critic". Rayner subsequently published to Twitter an itemised receipt.

Rayner included the review in his 2018 book Wasted Calories and Ruined Nights, a compendium of 20 of his negative reviews. In the foreword, he explained that he had written the review because he had been made "eye-gougingly, bone-crunchingly, teeth-grindingly angry" by the experience, so much so that it made him wonder what he could do to Le Cinq with "a can of kerosene and a box of matches".

The review was described by Vox as "a glorious 'the Emperor has no clothes' exercise", while Vice described it as "worth a read, in a craning-your-neck-to-look-at-a-very-expensive-car-crash kind of way". The Sydney Morning Herald described his images as depicting "piles of slime on plates". However, Libération's Elvire von Bardeleben felt Rayner was hypocritical for criticising the restaurant's opulence given that he had dined there for that reason and dismissed his review as contrarianism, while François-Régis Gaudry accused Rayner of bitterness and Alice Bosio of Le Figaro described Rayner's critique as a "diatribe as violent as it is a caricature". A "source close to" Christian Le Squer, the restaurant's head chef, described Rayner's review as "rich bashing". The review was listed by food website Eater on its "Best Bad Restaurant Reviews of 2017" listicle and described in 2023 by Sean Thomas of The Spectator as "one of the most famous British restaurant reviews of the last decade".
