= Alain Senderens =

French chef

- Born: 2 December 1939
- Died: 25 June 2017 (aged 77)

Alain Senderens (French pronunciation: [alɛ̃ sɑ̃dʁɛ̃s], 2 December 1939 – 25 June 2017) was a French chef and practitioner of Nouvelle Cuisine. Le Figaro credited him as the inventor of food and wine pairings.

== Biography ==
Senderens was born in Hyères, Var, France and completed secondary school in Labatut-Rivière. Before moving to Paris, he apprenticed at the Ambassador Hotel in Lourdes. In Paris, Senderens worked at well-known restaurants La Tour d'Argent and Lucas Carton, which he would later own. He later became the sous-chef at a Hilton restaurant near Orly Airport.

In 1968, Alain Senderens opened L'Archestrate in Paris, which he operated until 1985. In 1978, the restaurant earned three Michelin stars. He was the chef at Lucas Carton from 1985 until 2005, when he acquired ownership of the restaurant and renamed it Senderens. In 2005, he became the first chef to hand back his three Michelin stars after the restaurant was relaunched. At the time he said he could not charge an affordable price for meals while keeping up the standards Michelin required. As a result, Senderens stated that the customers pay a third of the former prices, return more often, generating profits that were nearly four times of what they were. Despite handing back his three star rating, Senderens was later awarded two stars by Michelin. In 2013, Senderens sold the restaurant, which reverted to its Lucas Carton name.

Senderens died at his home in Corrèze on 25 June 2017.

== Influence ==
The New York Times called him a founding father of Nouvelle Cuisine and he is recognized as a pioneer of food and wine pairings. He worked with his sommelier Didier Bureau and the wine magazine La Revue du vin de France “to make the wine happy”. Senderens trained a number of notable chefs, including: Alain Passard, who took over L'Archestrate and renamed it Arpège, Alain Solivérès of Taillevent, Christian Le Squer of Le Cinq, and Christopher Hache of Hôtel de Crillon.
