= Le Cinq =

Restaurant in Paris, France

Coordinates: 48°52′08″N 2°18′02″E

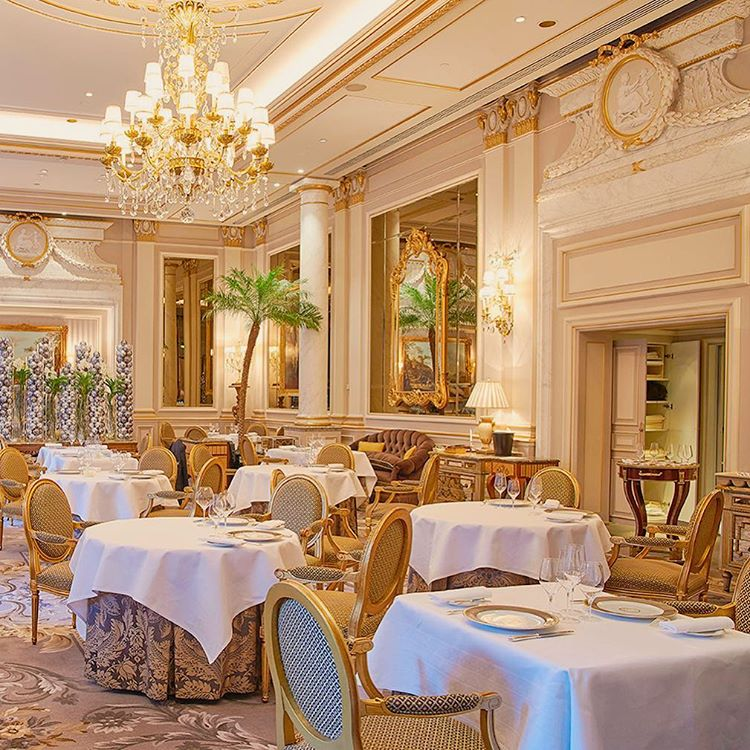
Dining room of Le Cinq restaurant

Le Cinq ([lə sɛ̃k], 'The Five') is a restaurant in Paris, France. One of three restaurants on the grounds of the Four Seasons Hotel George V, the restaurant reopened in December 1999 following a comprehensive refit of the hotel. The restaurant received positive reviews in The Arbuturian, Libération, and The Daily Telegraph and a viral negative review by Jay Rayner of The Observer.

== History ==
Le Cinq is one of three restaurants in Hotel George V, along with Le George and L'Orangerie. The hotel opened in 1928 and spent four decades popular with celebrities. By the 1980s, the hotel had been taken over by Forte Group, who were in turn taken over by Granada plc. The hotel festered under their ownership and was bought for $170 million in 1996 by Prince Al Waleed bin Talal bin Abdulaziz al Saud of Saudi Arabia, who had spent much of his childhood there. Both the hotel and the restaurant reopened in December 1999; its reopening took twice as long as expected as its construction workers were shackled by gentlemen's office hours by the hotel's wealthy and powerful neighbours, meaning they could only work between 10 am and 5:30 pm.

The restaurant hired Philippe Legendre as head chef, who had previously spent ten years working at Taillevent in Paris, which had held three Michelin stars while he was working there. Under Legendre's watch, Le Cinq won a Michelin star in 2000, a second in 2001, and held a third between 2003 and 2007. Éric Briffard took over from Legendre in summer 2008; a book of his recipes, Le Cinq, was published in 2014. Christian Le Squer took over from Briffard in October 2014; The restaurant regained its third Michelin star in 2016, and Le Squer was voted Chef of the Year by his peers.

== Reception ==
Jonesy of The Arbuturian reviewed Le Cinq in June 2012 and described his experience as "like dining in a grand French chateau". In 2015, Libération's Elvire von Bardeleben enjoyed a meal there. In July 2016, The Daily Telegraph's Jade Conroy wrote that her experience had benefited from the theatrical spectacle and the jazz music occasionally flowing in from the hotel's neighbouring lounge. In 2017, Le Cinq was ranked the 80th best place to eat on the planet.

On 9 April 2017, the restaurant was the subject of a review by The Observer's Jay Rayner. His review described the restaurant as "the scene of the crime" that had been decorated in "various shades of taupe, biscuit, and fuck you", with thick carpet to "muffle the screams". Having paid €600, he described his experience as "by far the worst restaurant experience I have endured in my 18 years in this job", exacerbated by having been served "by earnest waiters who have no idea just how awful the things they are doing to you are". Rayner's review went viral and received around 3,000 comments within three days; the extra traffic caused his website to crash. By 17 May, the review had been viewed more than 2,000,000 times and he had been dubbed "the world's most feared food critic". The review was praised by Vox and Vice but criticised by von Bardeleben, François-Régis Gaudry, and by Le Figaro. Rayner's review was listed by Eater as one of "The Best Bad Restaurant Reviews of 2017" and described by Sean Thomas of The Spectator in 2023 as "one of the most famous British restaurant reviews of the last decade".

== See also ==
- List of Michelin-starred restaurants in Paris
