= Hugo Birger =

Swedish painter (1854–1887)

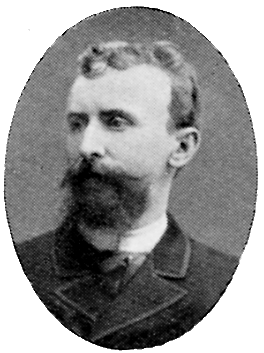
- Born: Hugo Birger Peterson; 12 January 1854; Stockholm, Sweden
- Died: 17 June 1887 (aged 33); Helsingborg, Sweden
- Education: Royal Swedish Academy of Arts
- Known for: painting
- Patrons: Pontus Fürstenberg

Signature
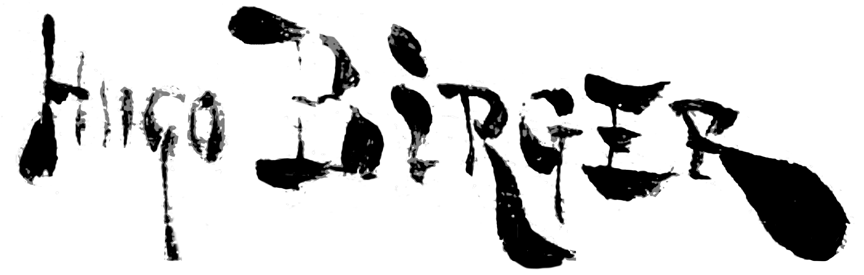

Frukosten hos Ledoyen (1886), Birger's most famous work

Hugo Birger (né Birger Peterson; 12 January 1854 – 17 June 1887) was a Swedish painter.

== Biography ==
=== Youth ===
Born in Stockholm, his father was printmaker Sven August Peterson who, among other things, printed securities. By accompanying his father around Stockholm's pubs, Birger became familiar with many artistic personalities already at the age of 10. This and the association with his father at his lithographic workshop gave Birger both a literary and artistic interest.

As a 13-year-old, Birger began his education at the Royal Swedish Academy of Fine Arts' preparatory school, which was the preparatory education for the academy. Birger spent three years drawing on "Principen". In 1870, he was then accepted as a student at the Royal Swedish Academy of Fine Arts, where he stayed for 6.5 years. Birger was weak early on from rheumatism, so he needed more time for his studies. Among his peers at the academy were Carl Larsson, Per Ekström and Ernst Josephson . It was here at the Royal Swedish Academy of Fine Arts, led by Professor Georg von Rosen, that Birger and his schoolmates laid the foundation for their talents and commitment to art. In the last year he received a gold medal for his painting "Syndafallet". It was praised for its strong colors and shininess.

=== To Paris ===
Birger moved to Paris in 1877, and spent the summer of 1878 in Barbizon with Carl Larsson and Carl Skånberg. It was here that he began to call himself Hugo Birger. When the painter Ernst Josephson moved from Rome to Paris, Birger became a resident with him on Rue Gabrielle(Gothenburg Museum of Art) in Montmartre where Josephson had taken over August Hagborg's studio house. There, Birger painted small pictures of the quiet street, the small corner of the garden or interior from the studio, preferably with elegant young ladies.

He debuted at the Paris Salon the following year with Rue Gabrielle (1879, now in the Gothenburg Museum of Art). He submitted his painting Toaletten (English: The Toilet), in which a lady is being redecorated by her hairdresser surrounded by her friends in front of the toilet mirror, to the Paris Salon in 1880. From 1881 to 1882, Birger visited Spain and Northern Africa. His largest painting from Spain was La feria ("The Feast Day", 1882, Gothenburg Museum of Art), which depicts a breakfast in Granada.

Hugo Birger's biggest supporter was Pontus Fürstenberg, who was a wholesaler in Gothenburg . Fürstenberg gave Birger a monthly fee that would be enough for rent, food and paints. Much of what Birger painted is preserved in Gothenburg's Museum of Art thanks to Fürstenberg.

=== To Spain ===
Because Birger suffered from severe rheumatism, he found it increasingly difficult to cope with the winters in Paris. Josephson even had to help Birger tape the brushes to his wrists in order to continue working. Birger therefore asked Fürstenberg for extra contributions to come down to warmer climates. In Paris, Birger had been inspired by the Spanish masters such as Diego Velasquez, Jusepe de Ribera, Francico de Zurbaran and Francisco Goya, and the trip therefore took off to Granada together with his friend Christian Skredsvig . It was difficult to find a hotel there so they looked up to the Alhambra Hill and found a tourist hotel.

The owner of the hotel had two adult daughters, one of whom was named Matilda, who became Hugo Birger's great love. They became engaged in Gibraltar, and in the spring of 1883 they were married in Paris . Just before the wedding, Birger completes "La Feria" - Breakfast in Granada - which depicts a breakfast on the veranda outside the small hotel with the whole host family gathered to enjoy the guitar and flamenco dance . The painting was purchased by Pontus Fürstenberg for 10,000 Swedish riksdaler - which can be seen at Gothenburg's art museum today.

Birger was then no longer satisfied by Parisian art. He had longed for Italy for a long time but had not dared to go there without the academy's support. He had applied for the state scholarship repeatedly since 1877 and applied for it again, again in vain. Until the end of 1884, Birger and his family stayed partly in Tangier, partly in the Alhambra, until an earthquake forced them to flee to Paris. In the summer of 1885, he saw his homeland again, painted west coast motifs, rock formations, green meadows, red cottages and the summer villas of Gothenburg magnates.

In 1885, Birger became one of the most ardent among the Opponenterna, a group of artists who demanded reform of the Royal Swedish Academy of Fine Arts . Ernst Josephson and Carl Larsson led the work against the academy. At the "Opponenterna's exhibition" in Blanch's art salon in Stockholm on September 15, 1885, Birger contributed several paintings. In 1886, the Artists' Union was formed as a counter-movement to the strict Academy of Arts.

=== the Big Painting ===
Despite this enthusiasm in Birger's life, he grew weaker and weaker. At times, Birger had severe ailments from his rheumatism. He wanted to fight on and took on the challenge that came to mean the most to him as an artist "Scandinavian artists' breakfast in Café Ledoyen". The work took just over 4 months to complete. The painting shows the Nordic artists' celebratory breakfast on the day of the opening (Vernissage), the day when the Salon opens and when the compatriots used to gather in Ledoyen's restaurant on the Champs Elysées . Birger had high hopes of finally receiving a prize with this painting. The painting was hung above a door in the salon and the jury's prize instead went to Richard Bergh's "Portrait of my wife". "Breakfast" then came to the Artists' Union's first exhibition in Stockholm in 1886, and at its opening Birger himself was also present. It was his last visit to Stockholm.

Birger's paintings were fairly well and fairly valued by the Swedish critics. Handelstidningen's critic admitted that "Breakfast at Ledoyen" was one of the "mature and most beautiful works the artist produced".

During the following winter in Paris, he was unable to work due to illness. In December 1886, Birger's doctor and friend Axel Munthe did an examination of Birger where the earlier fears came true. In addition to rheumatism, he had pulmonary tuberculosis that had been lurking for a long time, which turned into so-called galloping pneumonia . When the summer was in, Munthe brought him to Sweden by steamboat from Lübeck . Three days after arriving in Helsingborg, Hugo Birger died at Hotel Mollberg on June 17, 1887. He was then 33 years old and his artistic activity had only spanned a decade.

Hugo Birger is buried in the New cemetery in Helsingborg, near the chapel. The tombstone was previously decorated with a relief made by the good friend Carl Larsson . Due to an increased number of thefts in the area, the original relief was removed in 2008 and is now replaced by a copy.

== Gallery ==
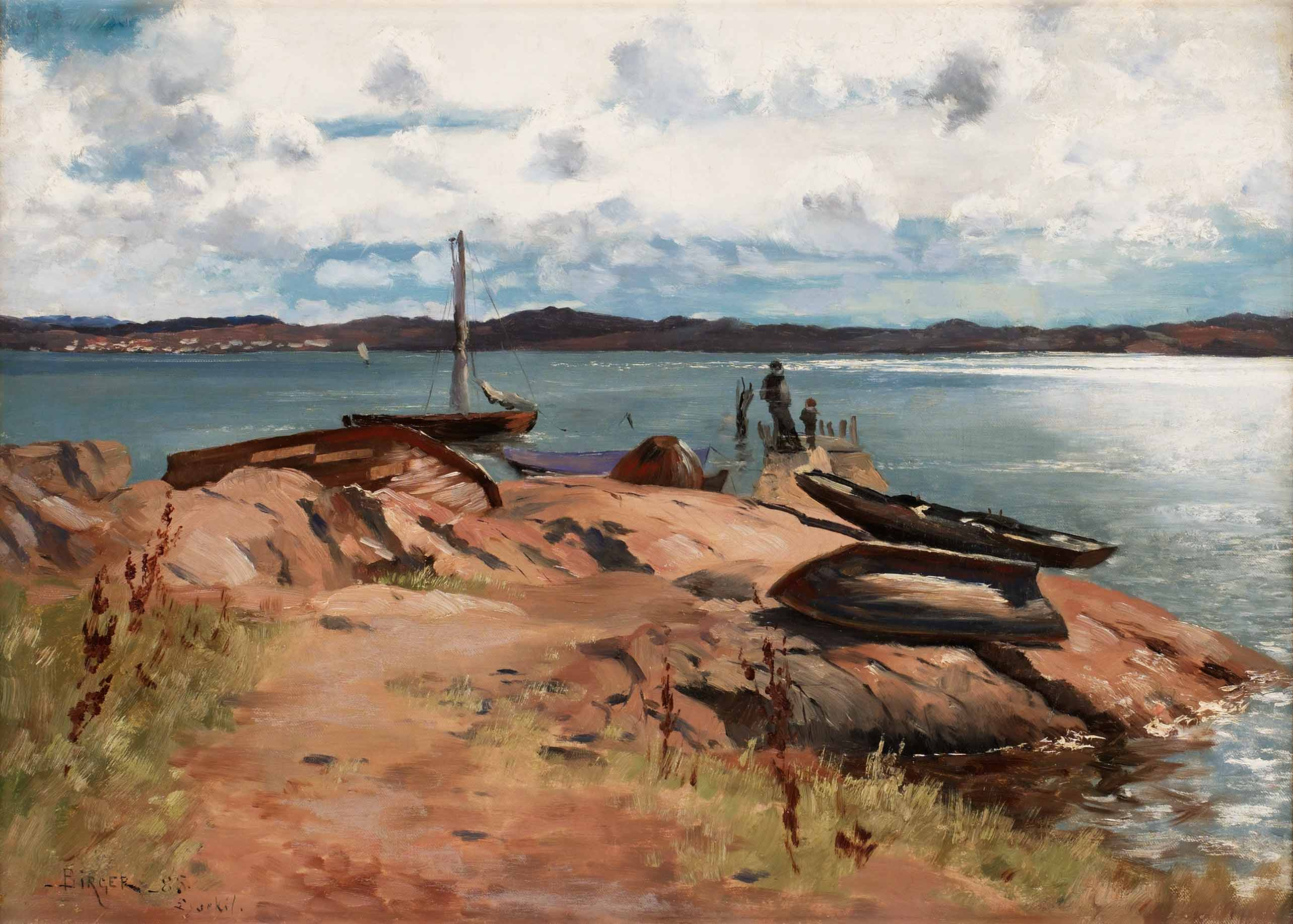
Vid bryggan, Lysekil (1885)

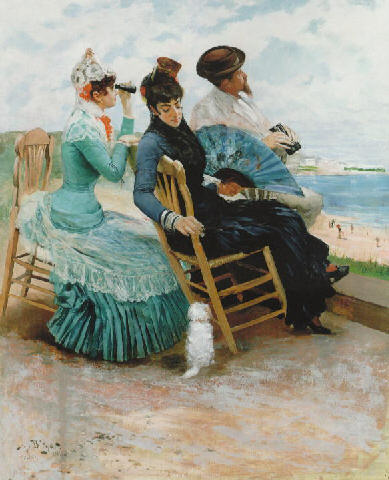
Damer och kavaljer vid stranden (1883)

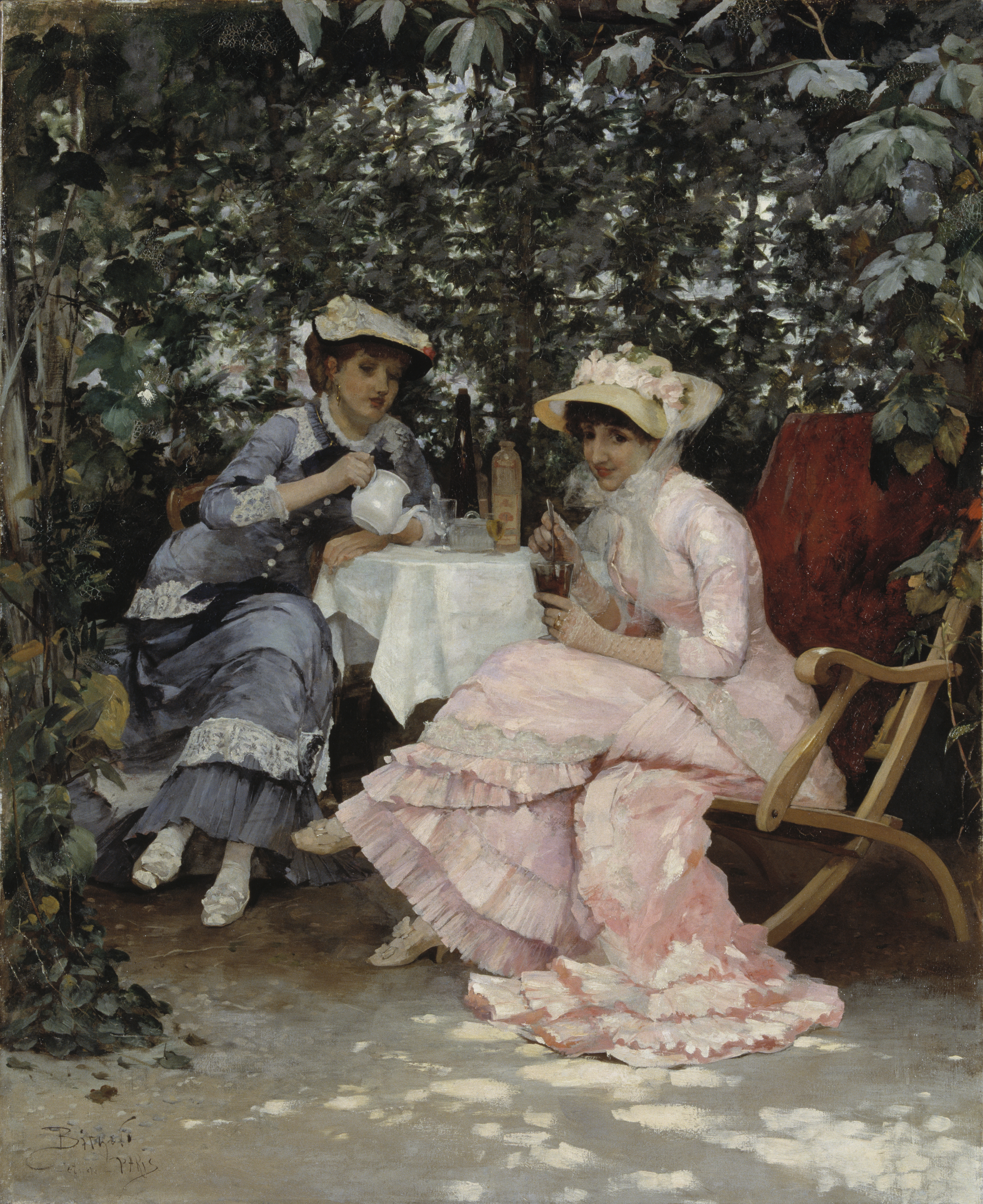
I bersån (1880)

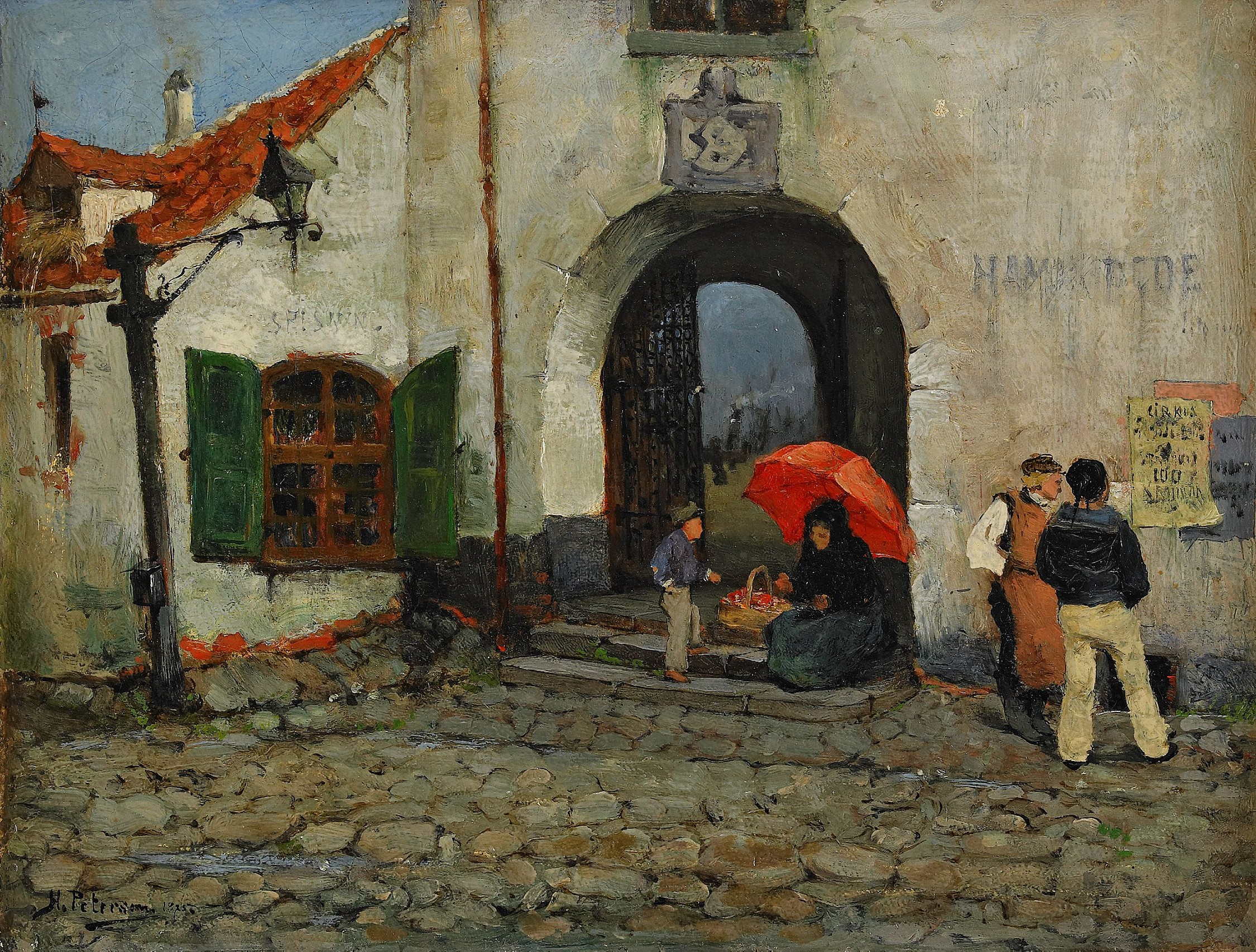
Utanför hamnfogdekontoret (1875)

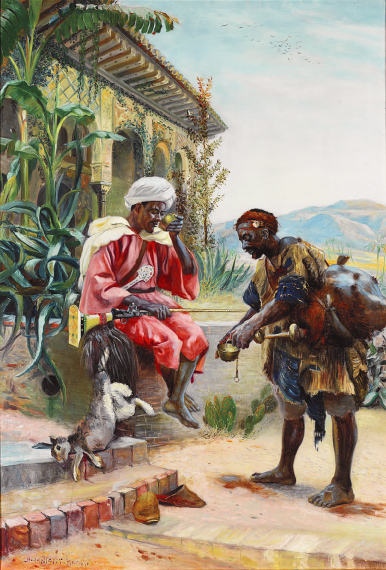
Nordafrikanska jägare rastar

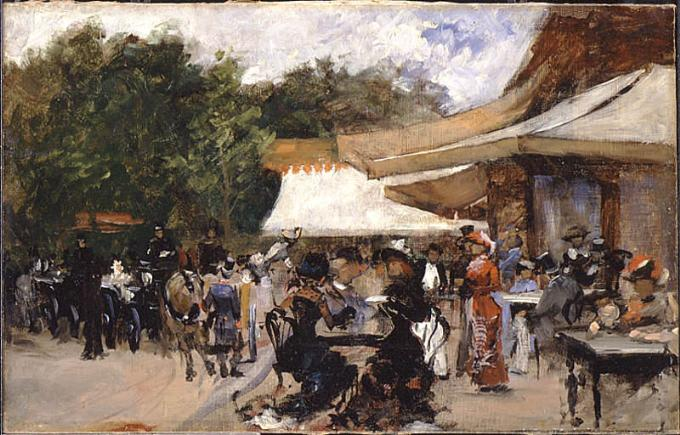
Utanför en restaurang i Bois de Boulogne
