= La Mazille =

French writer

La Mazille (born Andrée Maze, 1891–1984) was a French writer best remembered as the writer of the cookbook La Bonne Cuisine du Périgord.

== Biography ==
Andrée Maze was born in 1891 in Puteaux in the suburbs of Paris. Both of her parents had family roots in the Périgord near Périgueux on the Isle river. She spent her childhood and youth with her parents and sister between Paris and the Périgord.

Much of the information she gathered and recorded came directly from local people who, back then, were sometimes illiterate or had little or no education on writing skills. She herself was not a cook, but she had always had curiosity for good cuisine. Her parents had excellent regional cooks working for them long before World War I and Andrée learned from observing these women in the kitchen and from seeing their cooking methods.

Andrée Maze married Albert Mallet, who was also from that part of the Périgord, and they lived together in Paris. After the birth of their two daughters, Albert suggested to his wife writing down the recipes for the dishes which were served in their homes in the Périgord, with the idea of putting them together in a cookbook.

At the time there was no such thing as a regional cookbook with these recipes in written form. Albert Mallet had connections in the publishing circles in Paris and got a contract with the publishing house Flammarion for his wife. The book was titled La Bonne Cuisine du Périgord and went on sale in 1929. It was illustrated with fine black and white drawings by Renée Maze. Andrée Mallet-Maze chose the pen name of La Mazille, as an homage to a great aunt of hers.

The book soon was a success and much talked about. It has since become a basic reference work because it contains recipes which were collected first hand and directly transcribed by La Mazille from cooks who worked in various kitchens from fine estates. La Bonne Cuisine du Périgord has been reprinted several times with different covers. A Dutch translation is also available.

La Mazille had a unique sense of understanding the spirit of cooking and a very charming way of describing the way to cook. Because of her work and research many of these traditional dishes are still remembered and served. Her book also contains some folklore which otherwise would have been lost and is precious to keep.

La Mazille continued all through the years to be part of the literary life in the Périgord. She owned a lovely home there called Le Cluseau set on the top of a hill in the village of Planèze where she loved to spend time with her large family. She never ceased to write about the Périgord, novels, tales, stories and poems. She also wrote an autobiography.

Andrée Mallet-Maze died in 1984 near Paris.

== Prize La Mazille ==
Every two years, the Salon International du Livre Gourmand of Périgueux gives out a number of prizes to the best recently published cookbooks.

The prize La Mazille has been given to the following releases:

- 2010 : Yannick Alléno, Terroir Parisien (Laymon)
- 2010 : Pascal Aussignac, Cuisinier Gascon (Sud Ouest)
- 2008 : Jean-Marie Baudic, Juliette Baudic, Osez! L'antimanuel de cuisine (Menu Fretin)
- 2006 : Trish Deseine, Ma Petite Robe Noire et autres recettes (Marabout)
- 2004 : Christine Ferber, Philippe Model, Bernhard Winkelmann, Merveilles: Délicieuses recettes au pays d'Alice (Chêne)
