= Brasserie Julien =

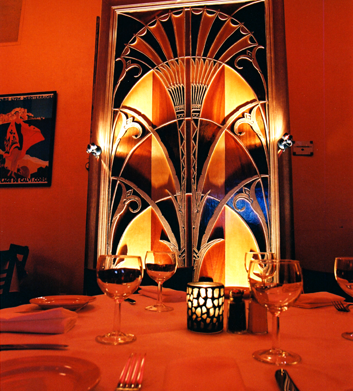
- Chrysler Building replica in Brasserie Julien
- Interactive map of Brasserie Julien

Restaurant information
- Established: 1999; 27 years ago
- Owners: Philippe Feret and Cecilia Pineda Feret
- Chef: Philippe Feret
- Food type: French cuisine
- Location: 1422 Third Avenue (between East 80th Street and East 81st Street), Upper East Side, Manhattan, New York City, New York, 10028, United States
- Coordinates: 40.775449°N 73.956726°W
- Website: brasseriejulien.com

Brasserie Julien was a brasserie-style French cuisine restaurant located at 1422 Third Avenue (between East 80th Street and East 81st Street) on the Upper East Side of Manhattan in New York City, as well as a jazz club. The establishment closed at the end of 2012.

== Restaurant ==
The restaurant was named after the son of co-owners Cecilia Pineda Feret and Chef Philippe Feret, who was an executive chef of Windows on the World restaurant, located in New York City, and a pastry chef at Taillevent restaurant, located in Paris, France.

The art-deco wooden decor was handmade by Chef Feret, including a replica of the elevator door of New York City's Chrysler Building.

The 2013 edition of Zagats gave it a food rating of 18 based on 2012 data. The establishment closed in November 2012.

== Jazz club ==
It was one of the few venues offering no-cover live music in the neighborhood, with resident jazz musician Sedric Choukroun, and notable vocalists including gospel-music artist Ayana Love and French chanteuse Flo Ankah.

== See also ==
- List of jazz clubs
- List of restaurants
