= Jean-Claude Vrinat =

French restaurateur (1936–2008)

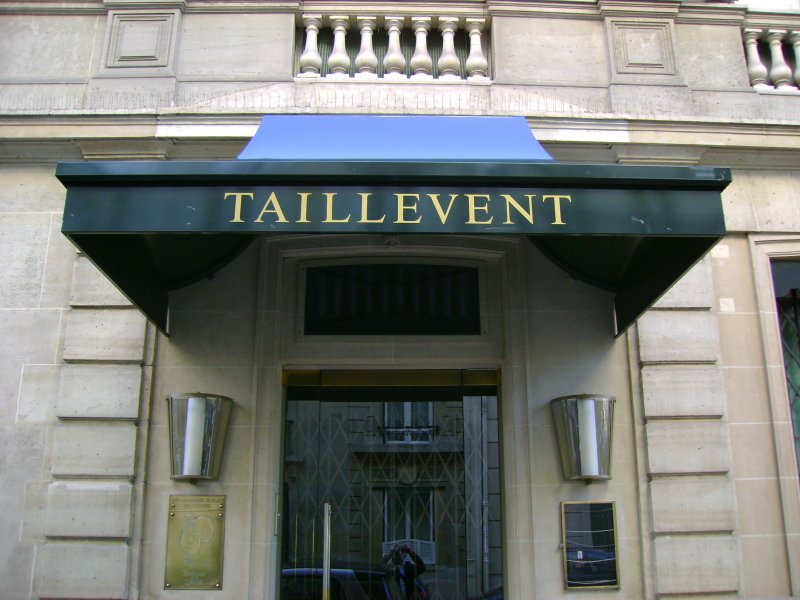
Jean-Claude Vrinat ran the Taillevent restaurant in Paris.

Jean-Claude Vrinat (12 April 1936 – 7 January 2008) was the owner of the Taillevent restaurant founded by his father André Vrinat in Paris. This two star restaurant, named after the court chef to King Charles V in the fourteenth century, has long been considered the epitome of haute cuisine and is also known for its excellent service and its comprehensive wine list. It held three stars from 1973 to 2007.

He served as a judge in the Paris Wine Tasting of 1976.

Born in Villeneuve-l'Archevêque near Chablis in Bourgogne, Vrinat was educated by the Oratorians and received his diploma from HEC Paris (l’Ecole des Hautes Etudes Commerciales) in 1959. He joined his father at the Taillevent in 1962 and inherited the restaurant on 3 September 1972. Vrinat branched out into retail wine sales with a shop called Les Caves Taillevent in 1987. He opened a smaller second Parisian restaurant L'Angle du Faubourg in March 2001.

Vrinat had a wife, Sabine, and they had one daughter. He died of lung cancer at a Parisian hospital on January 7, 2008, at the age of 71. His funeral was held at Église de la Madeleine in central Paris.

== See also ==
- List of wine personalities
