= Otto Hagborg =

Swedish genre painter and diver

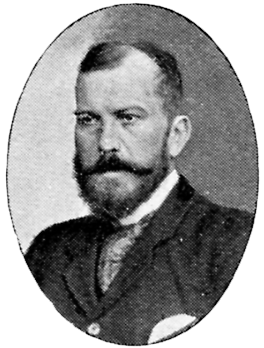
Otto Hagborg

Otto Josias Engelbrekt Hagborg (31 August 1854, Gothenburg - 5 January 1927, London) was a Swedish genre painter and diver. His brother was the painter, August Hagborg.

== Biography ==
After studying at Uppsala University, he travelled to Paris in 1880, where his brother was already a successful painter. Although he participated in exhibitions at the Salon des Artistes Français and at the Royal Academy of Arts in London, he never achieved the same level of success.

Around 1890, he settled in London with his friend, the athlete Hjalmar Johansson. There, he introduced "fancy diving" at the National Graceful Diving Competition, held by the Royal Life Saving Society in 1895.

Due to his love for landscape paintings, he travelled multiple times in Britanny during 1883 and 1886. He met Paul Gauguin.

He married the artist, Hannah Posener (1876–1957), in 1905. The following year, he went to Athens to participate in the 1906 Olympic Games in diving. He came 12th, even though, at the age of 51 years and nine months, he was the oldest participant in either swimming or diving. At club level, Hagborg represented Upsala S.

He became a British subject in 1926, almost exactly a year before his death. His works may be seen at the Göteborgs konstmuseum, among others.

== Gallery ==
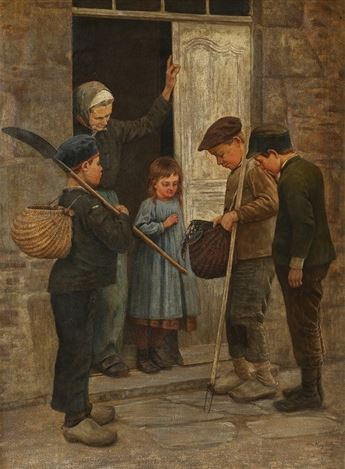
Presenting the Catch

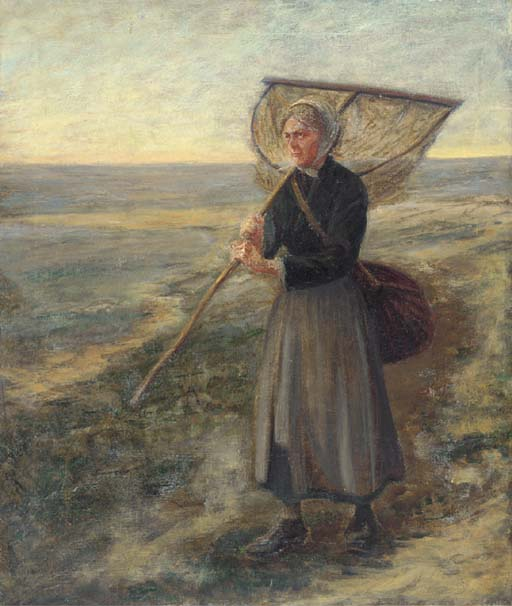
Shrimping

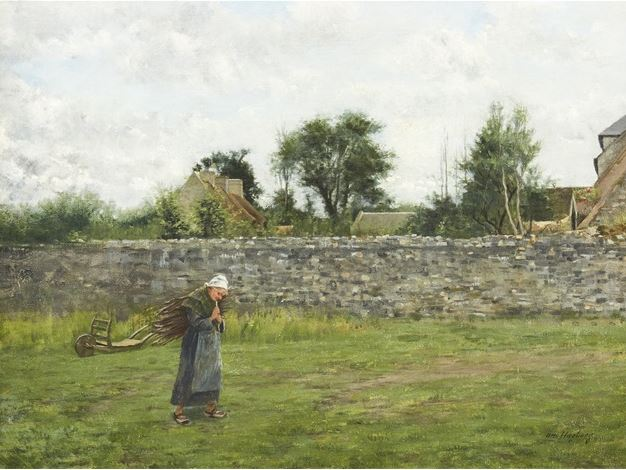
Village

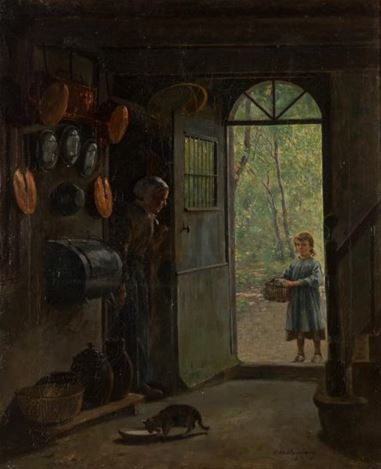
Visitor

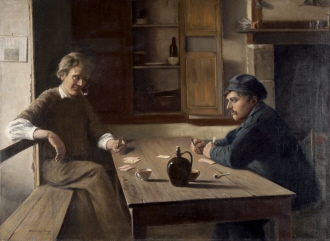
Players

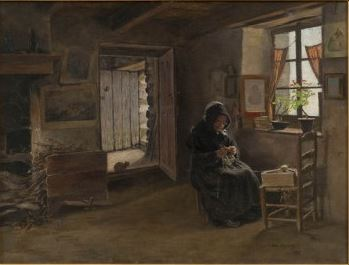
Grandma

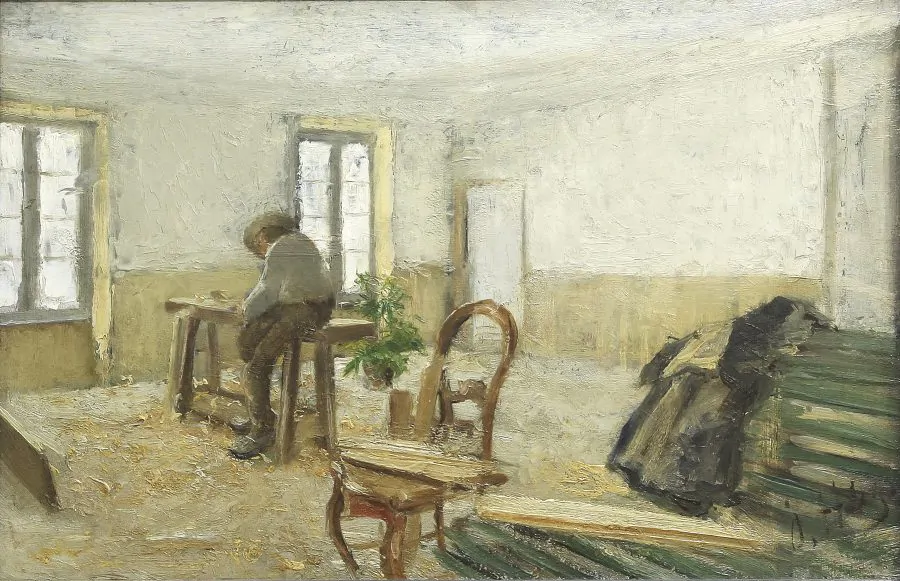
Carpentry in Pont-Aven
