= Pavillon Ledoyen =

Restaurant in Paris, France

Coordinates: 48°51′57.9″N 2°18′59.1″E

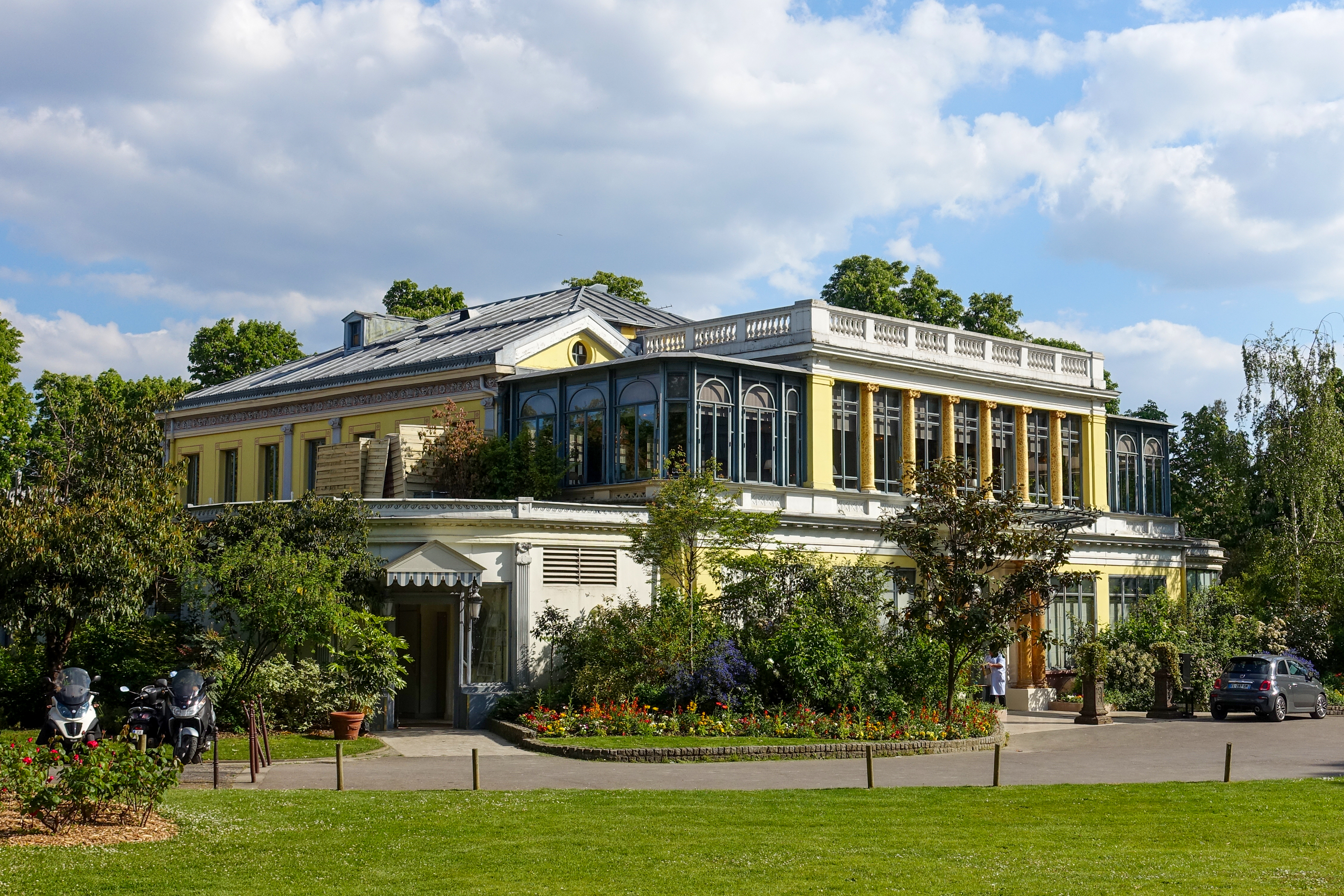
Pavillon Ledoyen in 2017

Alléno Paris au Pavillon Ledoyen, in the square gardens in the eastern part of the Champs-Élysées in the 8th arrondissement, is one of the oldest restaurants in Paris. Its long history places it on the Champs-Élysées before the street's beautification.

In a two-story pavilion with gardens, Ledoyen is considered to be one of Paris's best gourmet restaurants, and boasts three Michelin stars. The building is owned by the City of Paris. It is operated by the company Carré des Champs Elysées.

== History ==
Initially, it began in 1779 as a very small inn named Au Dauphin. It was near the Place Louis XV (current Place de la Concorde), near the Café des Ambassadeurs (between Avenue des Champs-Élysées and the current Avenue Gabriel). At that time it was a country inn on the outskirts of Paris and cows grazed in the fields outside. On 4 August 1791, Pierre-Michel Ledoyen, a son of caterers, rented it and established it as a formal restaurant.

Scandinavian Artists' Lunch at Cafe Ledoyen, by Hugo Birger, 1886

Ledoyen, a dishwasher in his early years, renamed the restaurant after himself in 1814, and it was owned by the Desmazures for many years. In 1842, architect Jacques Hittorff, responsible for the development of the gardens of the Champs-Élysées, transferred the restaurant to its present location. Six years later, it was repaired and renovated following a fire.

Today, the building's walls are owned by the city of Paris. It received three Michelin Star status under Christian Le Squer since 2002.

It is operated by Yannick Alléno, who in his first year achieved three Michelin stars.

== Architecture and fittings ==
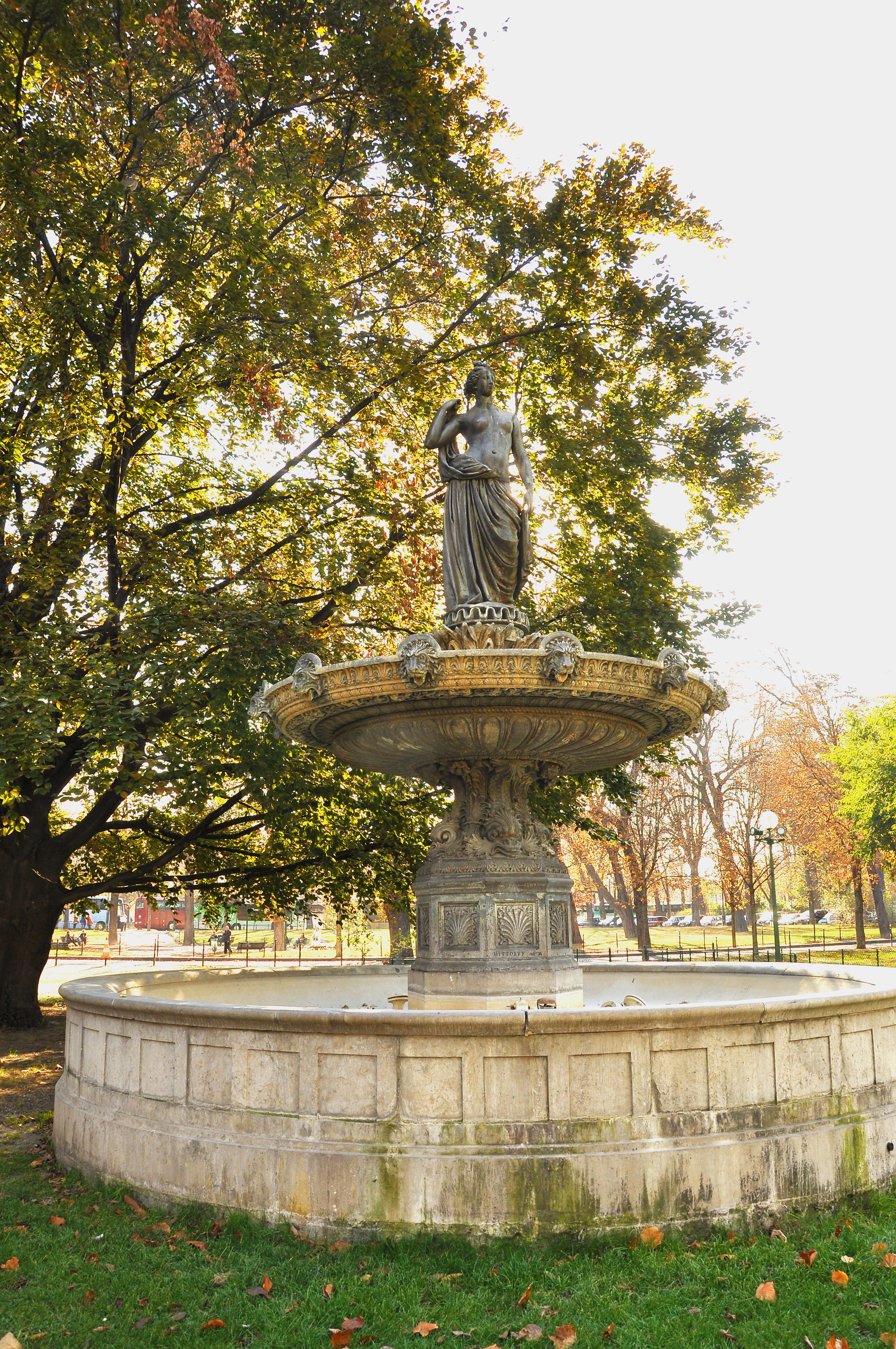
Diane's Fountain, next to Ledoyen, was built in 1840 by Jacques Hittorff and decorated by the sculptor Louis Desprez.

The original building was 13 by 4 metres (43 by 13 ft), with white walls and green shutters. When the restaurant was relocated in 1784 it was to a two-story pavilion with terraced gardens, designed in the Neoclassical style. The 1886 oil-on-canvas, Scandinavian Artists' Lunch at Cafe Ledoyen, Paris, on Varnishing Day by the Swedish painter Hugo Birger suggests something of the appearance of the restaurant in the late 19th century. Its features include many huge windows, ornate ceilings, and historic second floor rooms. Dining areas include outdoor seating, interior salons, and a 1950s-style grill room.

== Notable patrons ==
During the late 18th century, it was a haunt of Louis de Saint-Just and Maximilien Robespierre and they dined there on 26 July 1794, two days before their execution. Napoleon and Joséphine de Beauharnais reportedly met at the restaurant and the restaurant was also a favourite of artists and writers such as Danton, Marat, Degas, Monet, Zola, Flaubert and Guy de Maupassant. A mid-19th-century account states that the restaurant was also the breakfast place of duellists, who, after shooting at each other in the Bois de Boulogne, reconciled over breakfast at Ledoyen.

== See also ==
- List of Michelin three starred restaurants
