= Jay Rayner =

English journalist and food critic (born 1966)

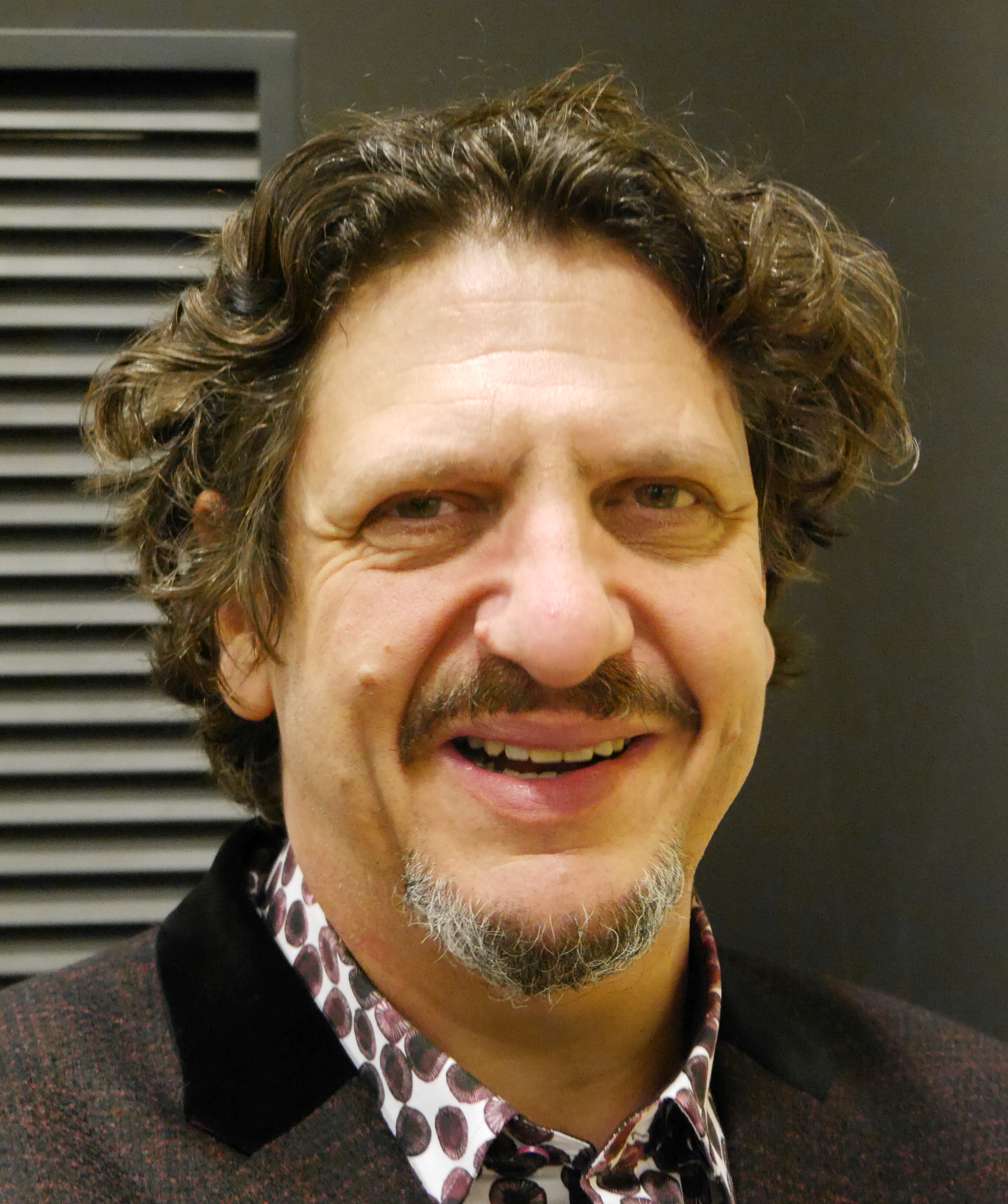
- Rayner in 2019
- Born: 14 September 1966 (age 59); Brent, London, England
- Education: University of Leeds
- Occupations: Broadcaster, writer, journalist, food critic
- Years active: 1988–present
- Employers: Financial Times; BBC; Channel 4; The Observer; The Mail on Sunday; The Independent on Sunday
- Spouse: Pat Gordon-Smith
- Children: 2
- Mother: Claire Rayner
- Awards: British Press Awards

Jay Rayner (born 14 September 1966) is an English journalist and food critic. After editing the Leeds Student newspaper while at university, he wrote for The Observer, The Independent on Sunday, and The Mail on Sunday before returning to The Observer in 1996.

Rayner became a restaurant critic in 1999 and developed a reputation for acerbity. Several of his reviews have been widely shared online, including a takedown of the Paris restaurant Le Cinq. Rayner has also been published in Esquire, Granta and Cosmopolitan, the last as a sex columnist. In 2025, he transferred from The Observer to the Financial Times.

Rayner has published books, including a book about the 1947 BSAA Avro Lancastrian Star Dust accident, three compendiums of his columns, several works of fiction, and several works about food, including a cookbook. Rayner has presented the BBC program The Kitchen Cabinet and the podcast Out to Lunch and has judged numerous cooking shows for broadcasters including MasterChef, where he was nicknamed "Acid Rayner". In 2012, he founded a jazz band, the Jay Rayner Quartet, which changed its name to the Jay Rayner Sextet in 2022.

== Early life and newspaper journalism ==
Rayner was born in the London Borough of Brent on 14 September 1966 to actor Desmond Rayner and journalist Claire Rayner, and was raised in Harrow on the Hill, London. He and his brother and sister are of Jewish descent, though he is non-observant. Rayner attended the independent Haberdashers' Aske's Boys' School and attracted headlines after being suspended in May 1983 for smoking cannabis. He was inspired to become a writer aged 14 by the Daily Mail miscellany column Dermot Purgavie's America and studied politics at the University of Leeds, where he was editor of the Leeds Student newspaper, having selected the university with the intention of holding the post. While there, he met Pat Gordon-Smith, whom he subsequently married.

After graduating in 1988, Rayner spent a year editing a tabloid student newspaper before being hired as a researcher by The Observer, a Sunday magazine then owned by The Guardian newspaper. He spent a few months there as its diary columnist, once making the front page of The Observer's arts section with an interview with Sammy Davis Jr., before spending a few years working freelance and for other newspapers including the Independent on Sunday and the Night and Day supplement of The Mail on Sunday. Among his works during this period was an Esquire piece co-written with Gordon-Smith about their fertility troubles. He also spent time as a sex columnist for Cosmopolitan before returning to The Observer in 1996 as a generalist.

Rayner contributed a piece for Granta 65 about Shirley Porter in March 1999. That month, after deciding to develop a specialism, and about three seconds after being told by The Observer's editor that Kathryn Flett would no longer be its restaurant critic, Rayner offered himself for the job, and got it. His reviews were described by The New Yorker in 2014 "sometimes incendiary, often crass, always cheeky" and by the Radio Times in 2016 as "providing a dyspeptic counter-note to the custard sweetness of Nigel Slater’s cookery pages". In October 2014, Rayner's review of the Beast in London was widely shared online. He made international headlines for a scathing April 2017 review of the Paris restaurant Le Cinq, shortly after which he was described as "the world's most feared food critic". He stated in 2018 that around a fifth of his reviews were negative.

During the COVID-19 pandemic, when many restaurants were forced to close, Rayner announced he would no longer publish reviews if he could not be generally positive about them. He resumed the following year after objecting to the cost of a Polo Lounge popup at the Dorchester Hotel. In a November 2024 article about the sale of The Observer to Tortoise Media, Sky News described him as "arguably The Observer's highest-profile writer". That month, Rayner announced his departure from The Observer for the Financial Times, citing The Observer's pending sale, the antisemitism of some Guardian staff, and The Observer's online opinion section "too often" being a "juvenile hellscape of salami-sliced identity politics". He transferred in March 2025.

== Books and broadcasting career ==
In 1994, Rayner published his debut book The Marble Kiss, an art history-based romance thriller based in Florence. The book had been researched via a trip to Italy funded by a £5,000 Cecil King travel bursary he had won for being named Young Journalist of the Year at the British Press Awards. A subsequent novel, 1998's Day of Atonement, was shortlisted for the Jewish Quarterly Prize for Fiction and republished as an e-book in 2015 to coincide with Rosh Hashanah, and was followed in 2002 by Star Dust Falling, a book about the 1947 BSAA Avro Lancastrian Star Dust accident. He then published The Apologist in 2004, about a fat, sexually incompetent journalist who becomes chief apologist for the United Nations, followed by The Oyster House Siege in 2007, about two burglars holding up a restaurant in Jermyn Street the day before the 1983 United Kingdom general election.

- Thou shalt eat with thy hands
- Thou shalt always worship leftovers
- Thou shalt covet thy neighbour's oxen
- Thou shalt cook—sometimes
- Thou shalt not cut off the fat
- Thou shalt choose thy dining companion bloody carefully
- Thou shalt not sneer at meat-free cookery
- Thou shalt celebrate the stinky
- Thou shalt not mistake food for pharmaceuticals
- Honour thy pig

— Rayner's Ten Food Commandments

Rayner's subsequent books were about food: The Man Who Ate the World (2008) comprised a year of experiences at Michelin starred restaurants in Las Vegas, Moscow, Dubai, Tokyo, New York, London, and Paris; A Greedy Man In a Hungry World (2014) was about food sustainability; The Ten (Food) Commandments (2016) comprised ten food laws he exhorted readers to observe; My Last Supper (2019) used the question of his last meal to explore his food past; and Nights Out at Home (2024) and Nights Out in the Kitchen were cookbooks based on meals that had impressed him. The last of these was announced in November 2025 and is scheduled for September 2026. He has also published the compilations My Dining Hell: Twenty Ways to Have a Lousy Night Out (2012) and Wasted Calories and Ruined Nights (2018), which each featured 20 of his negative restaurant reviews, and Chewing the Fat (2021), which comprised 40 of his earlier columns.

Rayner also presented nearly 200 films for The One Show between 2009 and 2016. He also presented BBC Radio 4's The Food Quiz and the station's food panel programme The Kitchen Cabinet; by 2023, the latter was airing its 40th series. In March 2019, he began presenting Out to Lunch, a podcast created by The Kitchen Cabinet co-producer Jez Nelson. Most episodes featured Rayner inviting a guest out to a restaurant of his choosing, although some episodes filmed during the COVID-19 pandemic were filmed remotely using takeaways and retitled In for Lunch. Adrian Edmondson took over the podcast in October 2023. Rayner also periodically appeared as a critic on episodes of the UK version of MasterChef and won its 2023 Battle of the Critics edition, for which he won a gold trophy shaped like a knife and fork. The latter was his idea, as he felt readers of Nights Out at Home would not believe his recipes were his. He has also judged the BBC Two series Eating With the Enemy, the first two series of the American show Top Chef Masters, and the Channel 4 series Tried and Tasted. His sour television demeanour earned him the nickname "Acid Rayner".

In 2011, Rayner won the Beard Liberation Front's Beard of the Year, beating Brian Blessed into second place. The following year, he was listed at No. 90 on the Independent's Twitter 100, a listing of the most influential users of that platform, and founded the Jay Rayner Quartet, a jazz band. Initially comprising himself on piano, Gordon-Smith on vocals, Rob Rickenberg on double bass, and Dave Lewis on saxophone, the band were hired from people he had met at a private members club he used to jam at. In September 2017, the quartet released a live album, A Night of Food and Agony, which had been recorded at Crazy Coqs in London. Drummer Sophie Alloway and guitarist Chris Cobbson joined the band in 2022, at which point it changed its name to the Jay Rayner Sextet; subsequent performances incorporated pop tracks from the 1980s.

== Bibliography ==
=== Fiction ===
- Rayner, Jay (1994). The Marble Kiss. Macmillan. ISBN 9780333621349.
- Rayner, Jay (1998). Day of Atonement. Black Swan. ISBN 9780552997836.
- Rayner, Jay (2004). The Apologist. McArthur & Company. ISBN 9781552784167.
- Rayner, Jay (2007). The Oyster House Siege. Atlantic Books. ISBN 9781843545668.

=== Non-fiction ===
- Rayner, Jay (2002). Star Dust Falling. Black Swan. ISBN 9780552999083.
- Rayner, Jay (2008). The Man Who Ate the World. Holt Paperbacks. ISBN 9780805086690.
- Rayner, Jay (2012). My Dining Hell: Twenty Ways to Have a Lousy Night Out. Penguin Books. ISBN 9780241963203.
- Rayner, Jay (2014). A Greedy Man in a Hungry World. HarperCollins. ISBN 9780007237609.
- Rayner, Jay (2016). The Ten (Food) Commandments. Penguin Books. ISBN 9780241976692.
- Rayner, Jay (2018). Wasted Calories and Ruined Nights. Biteback Publishing. ISBN 9781783351763.
- Rayner, Jay (2019). My Last Supper. Biteback Publishing. ISBN 9781783351466.
- Rayner, Jay (2021). Chewing the Fat: Tasting Notes from a Greedy Life. Biteback Publishing. ISBN 9781783352395.
- Rayner, Jay (2024). Nights Out at Home. Penguin Books. ISBN 9780241639580.

== Filmography ==
Title	Year	Role	Network
Paper Talk	1996–1998	Presenter	BBC Radio 5 Live
The Food Quiz	2003–2005	Presenter	BBC Radio 4
Masterchef	2007–present	Critic	BBC One/BBC Two
The Weakest Link	2008, 2022 (2 episodes)	Contestant	BBC One
Eating With the Enemy	2008	Judge	BBC Two
Top Chef Masters	2009–2010	Judge	Bravo
Great British Waste Menu	2010	Judge	BBC Two
Celebrity Mastermind	2011-2024 (3 episodes)	Contender	BBC One
Christmas University Challenge	2012, 2025 (2 episodes)	Contestant	BBC Two
Jewish Mum of the Year	2012 (1 episode)	Judge	Channel 4
Tried and Tasted	2017	Judge	Channel 4
The Final Table	2018 (1 episode)	Judge	Netflix
The World Cook	2022 (1 episode)	Judge	Amazon Prime

== Awards ==
- Restaurant Critic of the Year, Glenfiddich Food and Drink Awards (2001)
- Critic of the Year, British Press Awards (2006)
