= Christian Le Squer =

French chef (born 1962)

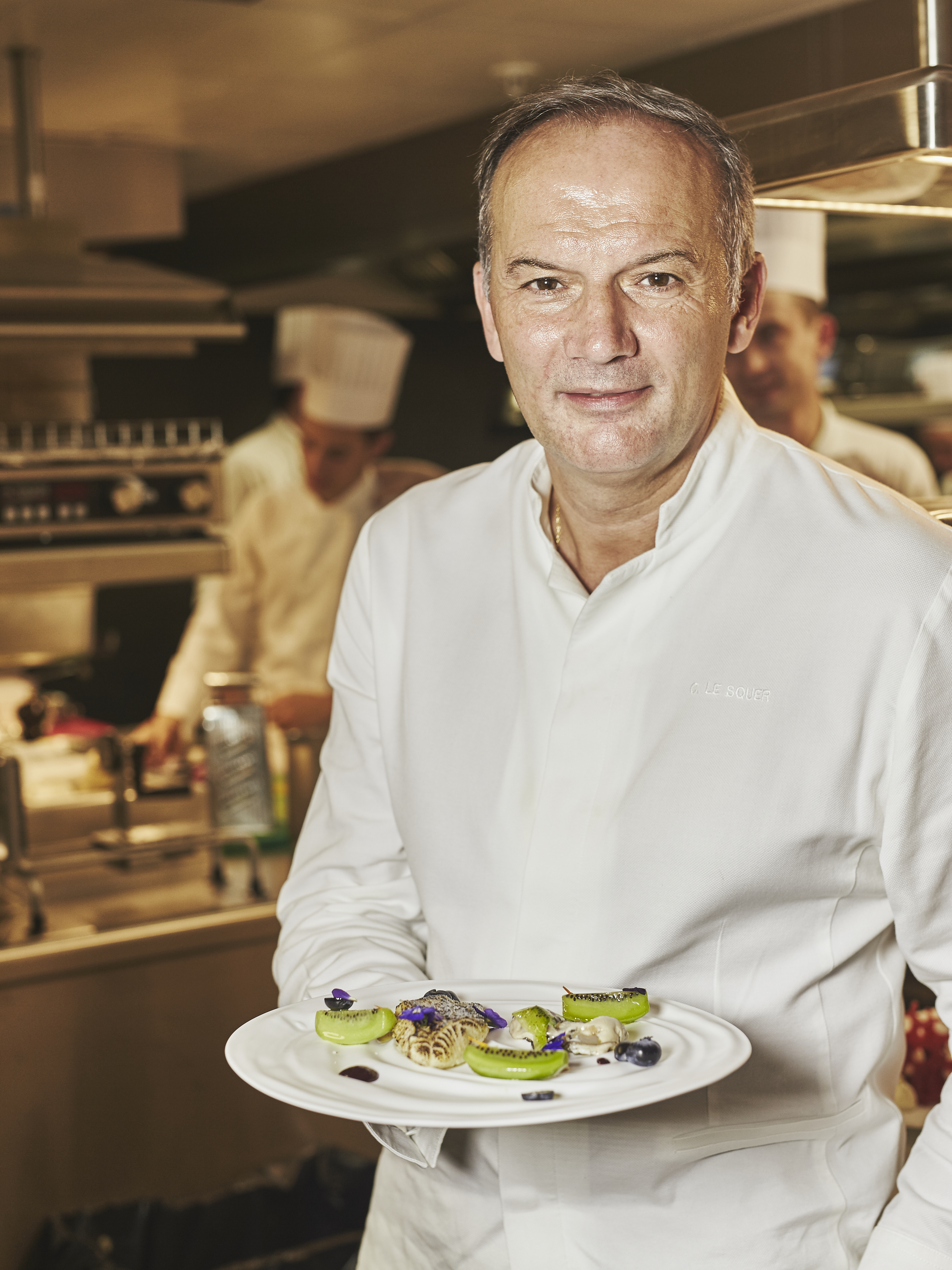
- Christian Le Squer
- Born: 30 September 1962 (age 64); Plouhinec, Morbihan, France
- Culinary career
- Cooking style: Haute cusine
- Rating
- Michelin stars
- Current restaurants
- Etc (Paris); La Grande Verrière (Paris); Le Cinq (Paris); Le Paris-Brest (Rennes); Onze (Toronto)
- Website: Chef Christian Le Squer

Christian Le Squer (born 30 September 1962) is a French chef. He is head chef at Restaurant Le Cinq in Paris, which holds three Michelin stars.

== Early life and education ==
Le Squer was born in Plouhinec in the department of Morbihan in Brittany. He first wanted to become a sailor and embarked at the age of 14 on his uncle's fishing trawler for two weeks where a sailor introduced him to cooking. He then hesitated between cooking and pastry, but a baking internship made him decide on a culinary career.

He joined a hotel school and graduated in 1986 with a Certificat d'Aptitude Professionnelle) and a Brevet d'Études Professionnelles) in cooking at a professional high school in Vannes.

== Professional career ==
After a training course in several prestigious restaurants located in Paris such as Le Divellec, Lucas Carton, Taillevent and Le Ritz, he became the chef of the Café de la Paix Restaurant Opéra, where he obtained in 1996 his first Michelin star and the second one in 1998.

In 1999, succeeding to Ghislaine Arabian, he became the chef of the Pavillon Ledoyen located at the avenue des Champs-Élysées in the 8th arrondissement of Paris. In 2000, he received two Michelin stars in this establishment, and obtained in 2002 his third star at the Guide Michelin. In 2008, he founded a new restaurant in Paris, the Etc. (Épicure traditionnelle cuisine), where he received one Michelin star the following year. In 2011, he founded the restaurant La Grande Verrière at the Jardin d'Acclimatation next to the Bois de Boulogne. In 2013, he was awarded with "five toques" by the Gault et Millau for the Restaurant Ledoyen.

Since 2014, he has held the position of head chef at restaurant Le Cinq at the Four Seasons Hotel George V in Paris, where he received two Michelin stars in 2015 and three in 2016.

In 2024, Le Squer opened LSL restaurant in Toronto, Canada alongside fellow Michelin-starred chef Masaki Saito. While Le Squer does not manage day-to-day cooking operations, he is in charge of menu development and concept, while serving as co-executive chef alongside Saito.

== Signature dishes ==
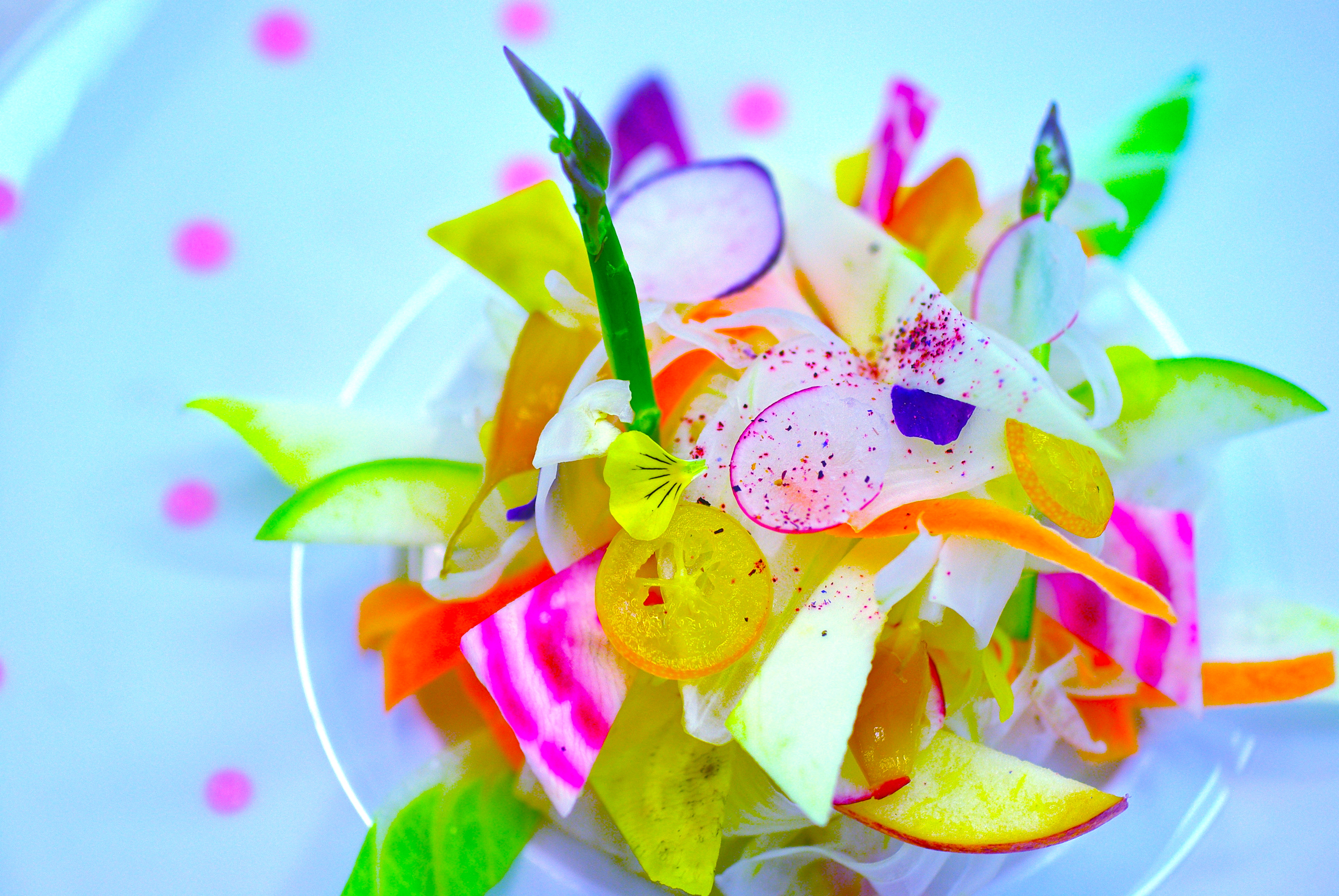
Sparkling vegetable garden

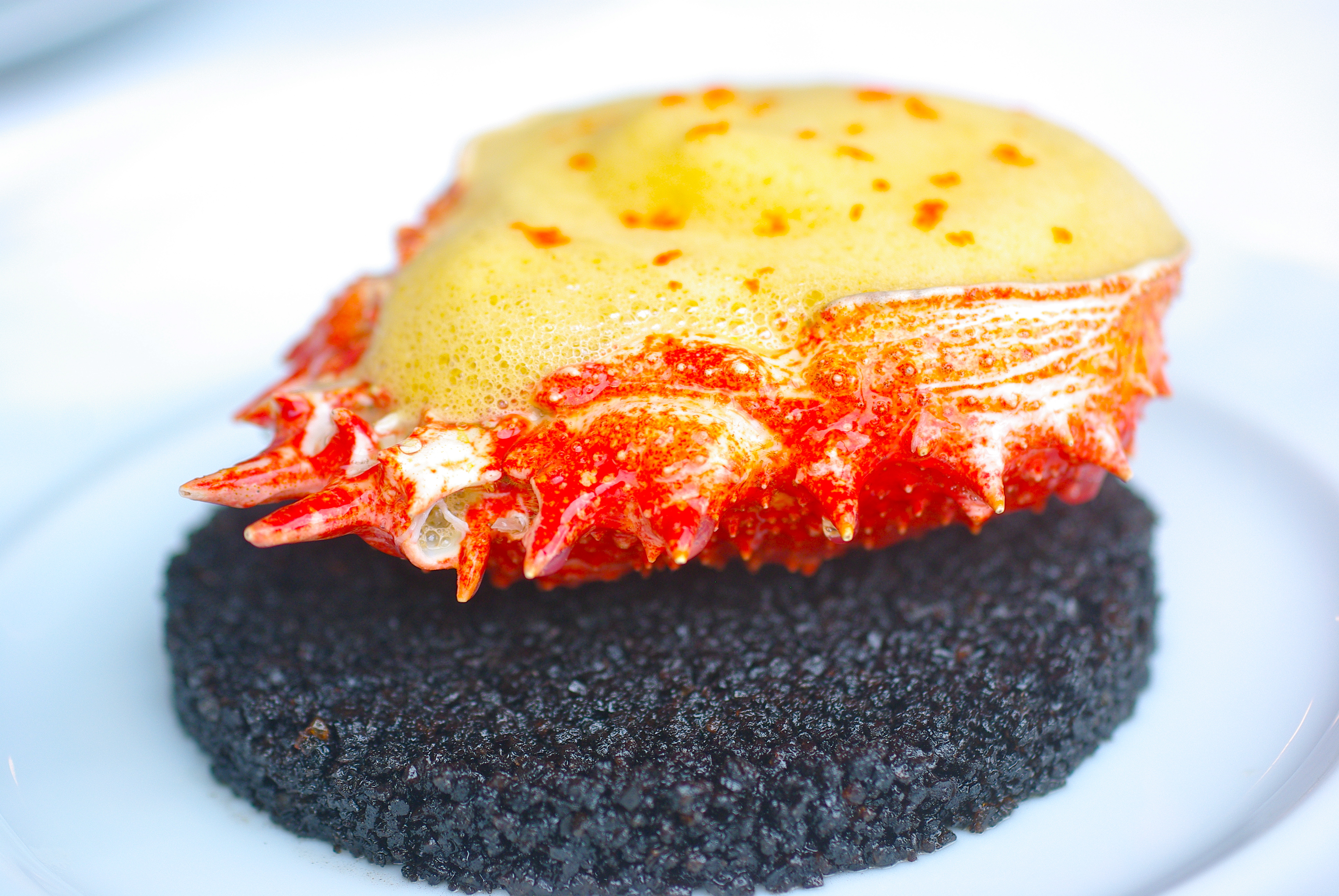
Spider crab in ice shell with pressed juice

- Turbot flesh with truffled emulsion of Ratte potatoes
- Small sole fillets with vin jaune
- Big crunchy scampis with citrus emulsion
- Chantilly of oysters
