= August Hagborg =

Swedish artist (1852–1921)

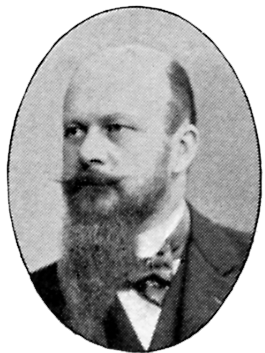
August Hagborg, from the Svenskt Porträttgalleri XX

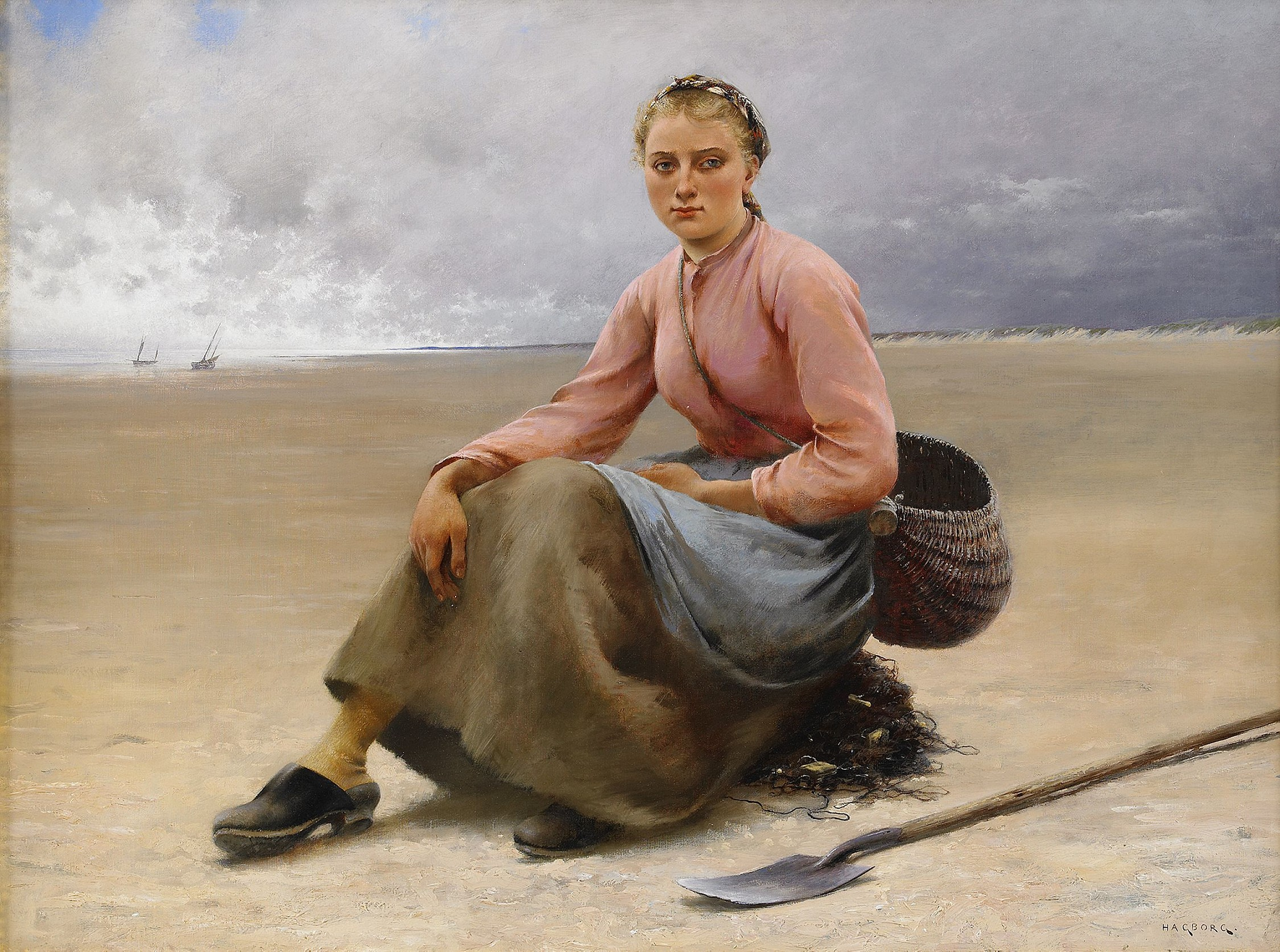
Oyster Picker in Brittany, a signature work that embodies Hagborg's ability to find quiet dignity in the labour of coastal people

Vilhelm Nikolaus August Hagborg (26 May 1852 – 30 April 1921) was a Swedish painter who spent the greater part of his professional life in France. He is most celebrated for his naturalistic depictions of the fishermen, oyster pickers, and coastal dwellers of Normandy and Brittany, and for his elegant genre scenes set in the French 18th century. A regular exhibitor at the Paris Salon for over three decades, Hagborg represented Sweden at several international exhibitions and became a respected member of the Scandinavian expatriate artistic community in Paris. His work bridges Swedish academic tradition and French naturalism, earning him honours such as the purchase of a painting by the Luxembourg Museum and royal patronage from King Oscar II.

== Early life and family background ==
=== Childhood in Gothenburg ===
Vilhelm Nikolaus August Hagborg was born on 26 May 1852 in the port city of Gothenburg, on the west coast of Sweden. His father, Nils Hagborg, was an associate professor at a gymnasium (secondary school), teaching subjects likely to have included Latin, history, or natural sciences. The Hagborg household valued learning and the pursuit of a respectable profession. August, however, displayed an early and unshakeable passion for drawing. Family anecdotes suggest that as a boy he filled the margins of his schoolbooks with sketches of ships, horses, and human figures, and that he spent much of his free time copying prints and illustrations.

Gothenburg in the 1850s and 1860s was a growing commercial centre, its docks crowded with vessels from across Europe. The young Hagborg was exposed to the sights and sounds of a working port, an experience that may well have planted the seed for his later fascination with fishermen, boats, and the sea. Despite his father's misgivings about the precarious life of an artist, the family eventually agreed to let him pursue formal training.

=== Support and opposition ===
The decision was not taken lightly. In mid-nineteenth-century Sweden, a career in the arts was often seen as unsuitable for a boy from an academic family. Nils Hagborg wanted his son to enter the church, the law, or the civil service. August's mother, whose name is less frequently recorded, appears to have been more sympathetic. After prolonged discussions, a compromise was reached: August would be allowed to try the Academy, but if he failed to distinguish himself, he would return to a conventional career. He never looked back.

== Education ==
=== The Royal Swedish Academy of Fine Arts (1872–1874) ===
In 1872, at the age of twenty, Hagborg enrolled at the Royal Swedish Academy of Fine Arts in Stockholm. The Academy was the principal institution for artistic training in Sweden, founded in the 18th century and steeped in the traditions of European academicism. Students progressed through a rigid curriculum: first, copying from plaster casts of classical sculptures; then, drawing from live models; finally, painting under the supervision of established masters.

Hagborg's principal teacher at the Academy was Vicente Palmaroli, a Spanish painter who had settled in Stockholm. Palmaroli was a versatile artist, adept at both historical compositions and lively contemporary scenes. His palette was warm, his brushwork fluid, and his teaching emphasized the importance of colour and light alongside correct draughtsmanship. This early exposure to a southern European sensibility left a lasting mark on Hagborg, who would later be drawn to the bright, muted light of the French coast.

Despite Palmaroli's guidance, Hagborg found the Academy stifling. The curriculum was conservative, focused on the production of large-scale history paintings in the Neo-Classical mould. There was little room for the direct observation of nature or for the kind of everyday subjects that Hagborg was already beginning to favour. He was not alone in his discontent; a generation of Swedish artists, including Ernst Josephson, Carl Larsson, and Anders Zorn, would soon rebel against the Academy's methods. Hagborg, however, chose a quieter path: he would simply leave Sweden for the broader horizons of Paris.

=== Move to Paris and atelier training (1875) ===
In 1875, Hagborg travelled to Paris, then the undisputed capital of the art world. He brought with him letters of introduction, a modest stipend from his family, and the ambition to complete his training in the ateliers of the leading French masters. He enrolled as a student in the atelier of a well-known academic painter, most likely Léon Bonnat or Jean-Léon Gérôme, though the exact name is not consistently recorded. These ateliers taught the rigorous techniques of figure construction, the handling of paint, and the composition of large narrative canvases that were expected at the official Salon.

Hagborg absorbed these lessons thoroughly. His early Parisian works show a command of anatomy and perspective that he had not fully attained in Stockholm. At the same time, he frequented the galleries of Paul Durand-Ruel and the annual Impressionist exhibitions, where he saw the work of Édouard Manet, Claude Monet, and their circle. While he never adopted the broken brushwork or pure colours of Impressionism, the emphasis on painting modern life, and on working outdoors, gradually reshaped his own artistic goals.

== Artistic career ==
=== Early success in genre painting ===
Hagborg's first exhibits at the Salon, beginning in 1876, were meticulously painted scenes of a bygone era. He specialised in episodes from the 18th century, a genre that was extremely popular with the French public. These pictures showed elegant ladies and gentlemen in silk and velvet, playing music, reading letters, or strolling in manicured gardens. The settings were often adorned with Rococo furniture, porcelain vases, and billowing draperies. While these works lacked the psychological depth of the Dutch genre masters, they were executed with an undeniable charm and technical assurance.

The Swedish market took note. One of these early historical genre scenes was purchased by King Oscar II, who was an active patron of the arts. The king, a man of broad cultural interests, had a particular fondness for paintings that combined technical skill with a pleasing subject matter. His purchase signalled to the Swedish aristocracy and bourgeoisie that Hagborg was an artist worth collecting, and it helped to sustain the painter through his first lean years in Paris.

=== Discovery of the coast and the break-through at the 1879 Salon ===
The pivotal moment in Hagborg's career occurred during a summer trip to Normandy in the late 1870s. He had left Paris, as many artists did, to escape the heat and to seek new motifs. On the beaches of the English Channel, he found a world that captivated him entirely. The fishing villages, with their granite cottages, their beached boats, and their inhabitants toiling under an immense, changeable sky, offered an inexhaustible source of subjects.

He began to paint the fishermen and their families, the oyster pickers at low tide, the children gathering driftwood, and the women mending nets. He worked outdoors in all weathers, making rapid oil sketches that he would later develop into finished studio canvases. The muted palette of the Channel coast (grey-greens, silver-blues, and chalky whites) entered his work, replacing the warm, confectionary tones of his genre pieces.

At the Salon of 1879, Hagborg exhibited a painting that crystallised this new direction. The picture, titled "Low Tide in the English Channel" (sometimes called "Low Tide on the Coast of the Channel"), depicted a broad expanse of wet sand under a pale sky. In the foreground, figures bent over their baskets, gathering shellfish. The composition was simple, almost austere, but the rendering of light and the sense of atmosphere were remarkable. The Luxembourg Museum, which served as the state's museum of contemporary art, purchased the painting directly from the exhibition. This was a tremendous honour for a young foreign painter, and it effectively launched his career.

=== International exhibitions and honours ===
Following the success of 1879, Hagborg became a sought-after exhibitor. In 1878, even before his Salon breakthrough, he had been selected to represent Sweden at the Exposition Universelle in Paris. For that exhibition he painted a monumental canvas, "Fisherman Carrying His Daughter", showing a bearded fisherman in oilskins striding through the surf, his small daughter cradled in his arms. The combination of heroic scale, naturalistic detail, and sentimental appeal made the painting a focal point of the Swedish section.

At the Salon of 1880, a marble portrait bust of Hagborg by the Swedish sculptor Ingel Fallstedt was exhibited. The bust presented the artist as a thoughtful, handsome man of thirty, with a full moustache and a direct gaze. It was an unusual public recognition, and it reinforced Hagborg's status within the Scandinavian artistic community.

In 1885, Hagborg joined the "Opponenterna", a group of Swedish artists who formally protested the rigid teaching methods and exhibition policies of the Royal Academy in Stockholm. The Opponenterna demanded, among other things, that the Academy embrace the principles of French naturalism and allow students greater freedom. Hagborg's participation, given his established reputation, lent credibility to the movement. While he was never a firebrand, he supported the cause through his signature and his moral backing, and the Opponenterna eventually succeeded in forcing reforms.

Hagborg also exhibited at the Exposition Universelle of 1889, which was dominated by the newly built Eiffel Tower. His paintings were hung in the Palace of Fine Arts, and he received a favourable mention from the international jury. Over the course of his career, he also showed works in Munich, Vienna, London, and Stockholm, ensuring a truly international audience.

=== Major works and thematic analysis ===
Hagborg's mature oeuvre can be divided into several thematic groups.

==== Coastal labour ====
The heart of his production consists of scenes of fishermen and their families. "Oyster Picker in Brittany" (also called "Oyster Gatherer in Brittany") is perhaps his most iconic image. It depicts a young woman in a traditional white coiffe (headdress), standing alone on the beach, a wicker basket under her arm. Her expression is calm and introspective, her figure modelled with an almost sculptural solidity against the pale, luminous sea and sky. The painting avoids anecdote and sentimentality; instead, it elevates the everyday labour of the coastal people to a timeless, universal plane.

Other notable works in this vein include "The Return of the Fishing Fleet", "Waiting for the Boats", "Fisherfolk on the Shore", and "The Net Menders". In each, Hagborg focuses on the human figure in relation to the vast, empty space of the beach and sea. He was particularly skilled at rendering the texture of wet sand, the gleam of fish scales, and the weight of heavy, salt-stained clothing.

==== Genre and history scenes ====
Hagborg continued to paint 18th-century genre scenes throughout his career, partly for financial reasons and partly because he genuinely enjoyed the subject. Works such as "The Music Lesson", "The Love Letter", and "A Game of Cards" were exhibited at the Salon and sold to private collectors. They are skilful but derivative, reflecting the pervasive influence of French artists like Ernest Meissonier and Jean-Baptiste Camille Corot.

==== Swedish landscapes ====
During his summers in Sweden, Hagborg painted landscapes in Skåne and Dalarö. These pictures are less dramatic than his French coastal scenes. They show flat fields under wide skies, rows of birch trees, and red wooden farmhouses reflected in calm water. The palette is slightly warmer, with soft greens and golden ochres predominating. These works, while rarely discussed in the art historical literature, demonstrate his ability to adapt his naturalist approach to the quieter landscape of his homeland.

=== Style and technique ===
Hagborg's technique was rooted in the academic tradition. He drew with precision, constructing his compositions through numerous preparatory studies. He painted on fine, tightly woven canvas, building up his surfaces in thin, even layers of oil paint. His brushwork was smooth and controlled, leaving little trace on the finished surface. He favoured a subdued palette, achieving harmony through careful modulations of tone rather than through strong colour contrasts.

His treatment of light, however, was distinctly modern. He studied the effects of the overcast sky and the moist sea air on the appearance of objects, achieving a sense of atmosphere that places his work within the broader current of 19th century naturalism. He was influenced, indirectly, by the Barbizon school and by painters such as Jules Bastien-Lepage, who combined academic finish with a sincere engagement with rural life. Unlike the Impressionists, Hagborg never dissolved form in light; his figures remain solid, his compositions orderly, his world a place of calm and enduring stability.

== The Scandinavian circle in Paris ==
Hagborg was an active member of the large expatriate Scandinavian community in Paris. This community included painters, sculptors, writers, and musicians, many of whom gathered regularly in the cafés of Montparnasse and in the studios of the more established artists.

His closest friend was Prince Eugen, Duke of Närke (1865–1947), the youngest son of King Oscar II. Prince Eugen was a talented landscape painter who had studied in Paris and who would later become one of Sweden's most important art patrons and collectors. The prince and Hagborg painted together on several occasions, and their correspondence, part of which is preserved in the Swedish National Archives, reveals a warm and mutually respectful friendship. Prince Eugen's own landscape style, with its emphasis on mood and atmosphere, owes something to Hagborg's influence, though the prince would eventually develop a more Symbolist approach.

Hagborg was also acquainted with Anders Zorn, Carl Larsson, and Bruno Liljefors, the three giants of Swedish painting at the turn of the century. While Hagborg's work was more conservative than Zorn's bravura Impressionism or Larsson's decorative modernism, the men respected each other's professionalism. Hagborg participated in group exhibitions with them and occasionally dined at Zorn's studio.

Among the Norwegians, he knew Frits Thaulow, the painter of snow scenes and rivers, and Christian Krohg, the social realist. The exchange of ideas between the Scandinavian artists in Paris was intense, and Hagborg absorbed something of each of them without losing his own distinctive voice.

== Personal life ==
=== Marriage and family ===
In 1885, during a summer visit to Sweden, Hagborg married Gerda Christina Göthberg (1863–1934) in Stockholm. Gerda was the daughter of a well-to-do Stockholm merchant, and the marriage brought Hagborg financial security and a stable home life. The couple had at least one son, who is mentioned in genealogical records but did not follow his father into the arts.

The Hagborgs maintained a residence in Paris, an apartment in the 9th arrondissement, not far from the studios of many of his colleagues. They also kept a summer house in Sweden, first in the Stockholm archipelago and later in Dalarna. The family travelled frequently, and Gerda often accompanied August on his painting trips to Normandy and Brittany.

=== Personality and interests ===
Contemporary accounts describe Hagborg as a mild-mannered, quietly humorous man, with a deep love for music and literature. He was an accomplished amateur violinist, and he often played chamber music with friends. He read widely in Swedish and French literature, and he was particularly fond of the novels of Gustave Flaubert and the poetry of Charles Baudelaire. These literary tastes, with their emphasis on precision and on the beauty of everyday life, are reflected in his paintings.

He was not a man of strong political convictions, but he was a patriot, and he remained deeply attached to Sweden. He followed the developments of Swedish art closely, and he was instrumental in helping young Swedish artists find their footing in Paris. He was remembered by his friends as a generous host and a loyal companion.

=== Brother Otto Hagborg ===
His younger brother, Otto Hagborg (1854–1927), was both a painter and a professional diver. He specialised in marine subjects and underwater scenes, and his unusual combination of occupations made him a minor celebrity. The two brothers were close, and Otto occasionally accompanied August on his coastal painting expeditions, contributing his knowledge of the sea and its workings to his brother's art.

== Later years and final works ==
=== Return to Sweden ===
In 1909, after more than three decades in Paris, Hagborg and his wife decided to return to Sweden. The reasons for the move are not fully documented, but they likely included a desire to be closer to family and a growing weariness with the Parisian art scene, which had changed dramatically with the rise of Fauvism, Cubism, and other avant-garde movements. Hagborg was now in his late fifties, and his style was no longer at the forefront of contemporary taste.

The couple settled in Stockholm but spent long periods in the province of Dalarna, in central Sweden. Dalarna is a region of forests, lakes, and small, red-painted farmsteads, a landscape utterly different from the salt marshes of Brittany. Hagborg embraced the new setting with enthusiasm. He painted the rolling hills, the dark spruce forests, and the traditional Midsummer celebrations of the local people. His palette lightened, and his brushwork became looser, more expressive, as if the clear northern light had released him from the tonal sobriety of his French years.

=== Late style and abstraction ===
From about 1914 onward, Hagborg's work became increasingly abstract in its treatment of form. He began to dissolve the outlines of trees and buildings in shimmering planes of colour, moving tentatively toward a style that bordered on the decorative. These late paintings puzzled some of his contemporaries but have since been recognised as an intriguing coda to a career spent in faithful observation of the natural world. A few of these late works were exhibited at the Liljevalchs konsthall in Stockholm in 1918, to mixed reviews.

=== Death and burial ===
August Hagborg died in Paris on 30 April 1921, at the age of sixty-eight. He had travelled back to France for medical treatment and to settle some remaining affairs. His death was widely reported in the Swedish press, and obituaries praised him as one of the most successful Swedish painters to have worked abroad. His body was returned to Sweden and buried in the family plot at the Norra begravningsplatsen (Northern Cemetery) in Stockholm, the final resting place of many of Sweden's cultural and political figures.

== Posthumous reputation and legacy ==
=== Critical reassessment ===
For much of the 20th century, Hagborg's reputation languished. The triumph of modernism, with its emphasis on formal innovation and its rejection of academic naturalism, made his serene, well-crafted scenes appear dated. His works were relegated to the storerooms of museums and were rarely reproduced in surveys of Swedish art.

In the 1980s and 1990s, however, a revival of interest in 19th-century Salon painting brought Hagborg back into the light. Art historians began to reassess the naturalist tradition, recognising that painters like Hagborg had been unjustly marginalised. Exhibitions such as "French Naturalism and the Scandinavian Imagination" (Stockholm, 1987) included his paintings alongside those of his better-known contemporaries, and scholars began to appreciate the quiet integrity of his work.

=== Auctions and the art market ===
Hagborg's paintings have appeared with some regularity at auction houses in Sweden and internationally. His coastal scenes, in particular, have fetched strong prices. In 2004, a large version of "Oyster Picker in Brittany" sold at Bukowskis in Stockholm for 1.2 million Swedish kronor. In 2018, a smaller coastal scene achieved a price well above its estimate at Sotheby's London. These results suggest that a new generation of collectors has discovered the appeal of Hagborg's art.

=== Museum collections ===
His works are held in the following public collections:

- Nationalmuseum, Stockholm – several coastal scenes and genre paintings.
- Göteborgs konstmuseum, Gothenburg – a fine selection of his French and Swedish subjects.
- Musée d'Orsay, Paris – the painting "Low Tide in the English Channel" (formerly in the Luxembourg Museum).
- Waldemarsudde, Stockholm – a landscape once owned by Prince Eugen.
- Malmö Art Museum – a small collection of drawings and one oil painting.

=== Memorial exhibitions ===
A memorial exhibition was held at the Royal Academy in Stockholm in 1922, bringing together some eighty of his paintings. A more focused retrospective was mounted at the Gothenburg Museum of Art in 1935, on the fiftieth anniversary of his marriage. In 2002, the Nationalmuseum in Stockholm organised a smaller, focused display titled "August Hagborg: A Swede in Paris", which helped to introduce his work to a new public.

== Detailed chronology of major exhibitions ==
Selected exhibitions
Year	Exhibition	Location	Notable Works Shown
1876	Salon	Paris	"The Music Lesson" (debut)
1878	Exposition Universelle	Paris	"Fisherman Carrying His Daughter"
1879	Salon	Paris	"Low Tide in the English Channel" (Luxembourg Museum purchase)
1880	Salon	Paris	"The Net Menders", and bust by Ingel Fallstedt
1885	Opponenterna exhibition	Stockholm	Several coastal scenes
1889	Exposition Universelle	Paris	"Oyster Picker", "Return of the Fleet"
1893	World's Columbian Exposition	Chicago, USA	"Waiting for the Boats"
1900	Exposition Universelle	Paris	"Fisherfolk of Brittany"
1909	Salon	Paris	Last regular Salon showing; "Dalarna Landscape"
1918	Liljevalchs konsthall	Stockholm	Late, more abstract Swedish landscapes
1922	Memorial Exhibition	Stockholm	Retrospective of 80 works
1935	Gothenburg Museum of Art	Gothenburg	"August Hagborg: A Retrospective"
2002	Nationalmuseum	Stockholm	"August Hagborg: A Swede in Paris"

== Gallery of described works (selected) ==
As images cannot be fully reproduced here, the following are detailed verbal descriptions of several key paintings:

- Low Tide in the English Channel (1879) – A horizontal composition showing a wide, flat beach under a high, pale sky. In the middle distance, two women stoop to gather shellfish, their reflections caught in the shallow water left by the receding tide. To the right, a fishing boat rests on the sand. The palette is restricted to silvery greys, muted blues, and soft browns. The overall effect is one of calm and spaciousness.
- Oyster Picker in Brittany (c. 1885) – A single, life-size figure of a young woman, shown full-length, standing on the beach. She wears a white linen coiffe and a simple, dark blue dress. A wicker basket hangs from her arm. Behind her, the sea and sky merge into a pearly, indistinct horizon. The woman's face, tilted slightly downward, bears an expression of quiet weariness and dignity. The brushwork is smooth and the modelling of the figure solid, giving her an almost sculptural presence.
- Fisherman Carrying His Daughter (1878) – A large vertical canvas. A burly fisherman, dressed in heavy oilskins and a woollen cap, strides through the shallow water of the shore. In his arms he carries a small girl, perhaps four or five years old, who clings to his neck. The man's face is weathered and unsmiling; the child's is pressed against his shoulder. Behind them, a grey sea and a lowering sky. The painting combines the heroic and the intimate, appealing to both national pride and domestic sentiment.
- The Return of the Fleet (c. 1890) – Shows a group of women and children gathered on a stone quay, watching as several fishing boats approach the harbour. The boats are dark silhouettes against a luminous evening sky. The women's poses convey a mixture of hope and anxiety. The painting is notable for its handling of the fading light and for the carefully observed details of the fishing gear.
- Dalarna Landscape, Summer Evening (c. 1915) – One of his late Swedish works. A view across a lake toward a line of dark spruce trees. The sky is a pale pink and gold, reflected in the still water. The paint is applied in broad, fluid strokes, with little attention to fine detail. The mood is tranquil, almost dreamlike.
