= The Arbuturian =

Daily online magazine

- The Arbuturian Logo
- Categories: Gourmet, Lifestyle, Culture, Travel
- Frequency: Daily
- Founded: 2009
- Country: United Kingdom
- Based in: London
- Language: English
- Website: www.arbuturian.com

The Arbuturian is a daily online magazine covering food and drink, arts and culture, exotic travel and luxury living. The magazine's remit is to provide "intelligent content for a cultured readership who seek a playful approach to a diverse range of subject matter." The magazine takes its inspiration from Jerome K. Jerome and specialises in narrative feature editorial.

== History ==
Established in London in 2009, their remit and readership quickly grew and the magazine is now internationally recognised with notable audiences in the United States, Europe and Japan. They remain independently owned and operated.

== Content ==
The magazine has a liberal bias and takes a playful approach to luxury lifestyle topics, combining food, culture and travel features with some literary fiction and humorous narratives in a single edition. The content is primarily produced by contributing writers; most articles employ a style of narrative journalism, while informative pieces are written in short-form method. Their reviews include restaurants, hotels, theatre, art, music and general travel features.

== Awards ==
In 2012 the magazine was shortlisted as a finalist at the British Travel Press Awards for Best Online Consumer Travel Publication of the Year, alongside The Telegraph, The Guardian and Condé Nast Traveller.

In 2013 the magazine's Food & Drink Editor, Noah May, won an award for Food Journalist of the Year at the Guild of Food Writers Awards for work published in The Arbuturian.

Also in 2013, Cigar Editor Nick Hammond won The Spectator's Cigar Journalist of the Year Award.

== Demographic ==
The publication strongly appeals to an AB / High-Net-Worth demographic with a cultured background and disposable income. The content is not gender biased and appeals equally to men and women.

== Contributors ==
Various broadsheet journalists, magazine writers, critics and authors contribute to the magazine, including theatre critic and broadcaster Al Senter and the writer, photographer and filmmaker Paul Joyce, the great-grand-nephew of James Joyce.
