= Philippe Legendre =

French chef

Philippe Legendre was head chef of the Michelin three-star (2003-2007) restaurant Le Cinq at the George V Hotel in the 8th arrondissement in Paris, France.

== Biography ==
Philippe Legendre was born in Vendée. He arrived in Paris at the age of 16 and began working in some of the city's great Parisian hotels and gastronomic establishments, such as the Sheraton, Lucas Carton, Ritz, and Taillevent, where he worked for 18 years.

In 1999 Philippe Legendre became the head of the restaurant Le Cinq of the Hotel George V, where he was head of a brigade of 70 cooks. He had won the restaurant three Michelin stars during the years 2003–2007, before being demoted to 2 stars in 2008.
