= Yannick Alléno =

French chef

- Alléno in 2023
- Born: 16 December 1968 (age 57); Puteaux, France
- Culinary career
- Cooking style: Haute cuisine

Yannick Alléno (born 16 December 1968) is a French chef who operates the restaurants Pavillon Ledoyen and L'Abysse in Paris and Le 1947 in Courchevel. His restaurants have earned sixteen Michelin stars.

== Biography ==
Alléno in 2011

Born on 16 December 1968 in Puteaux, Yannick Alléno studied at the Lycée Santos-Dumont in Saint-Cloud. He began his career at the Royal Monceau working with Gabriel Biscay before joining the Hotel Sofitel Sèvres and working closely with chefs Roland Durand and Martial Henguehardm. After entering Drouant and studying under Chef Louis Grondard, he started the Scribe kitchens.

In 2003, the Hotel Le Meurice appointed Alléno chef de cuisine, where he stayed for 10 years. In 2008 he founded the restaurant Le 1947 at Cheval Blanc Courchevel, and in July 2014 he took over the kitchens of Pavillon Ledoyen on the Champs-Elysées in Paris.

In 2008, with Florence Cane, he launched Le Groupe Yannick Alléno, with clients in Saint-Tropez and Paris, at the Royal Mansour in Marrakech, at the One&Only The Palm in Dubai, at the Shangri-La in Beijing and in the 101 tower in Taipei. He also launched the magazine Yam, and published in 2014 "Sauces Réflexion d'un cuisinier" in which he described new methods of flavor extraction for sauces.

Alléno's restaurants Pavillon Ledoyen and Le 1947 each earned three Michelin stars, and STAY and L'Abysse have each earned one.

In 2015, former staff of Pavillon Ledoyen, along with the CGT trade union, filed a suit in labour relations court accusing Alléno and second-in-command Sébastien Lefort of harassment and violent behavior including kicking one employee in the thigh. Alléno, Lefort and Cane denied the allegations.

== Restaurants ==
- Pavillon Ledoyen – Carré des Champs-Élysées, 8th arrondissement of Paris – France:
  - Alléno Paris: 3 stars Michelin Guide since 2015
  - L'Abysse: sushi bar. 2 stars
- Beaupassage – 7th arrondissement of Paris – France:
  - Allénothèque: contemporary restaurant and wine cellar
- Hôtel Le Cheval Blanc – Courchevel – France:
  - 1947: 3 stars Michelin Guide since 2017
  - Le Triptyque: contemporary restaurant
- Royal Mansour – Marrakesh:
  - Gastronomic Restaurant La Grande Table Française
  - Gastronomic Restaurant La Grande Table Marocaine
  - Restaurant La Table: French cuisine
- One&Only The Palm – Dubai:
  - STAY by Yannick Alléno. 2 stars
  - ZEST
  - 1O1: Mediterranean contemporary restaurant
- Signiel Seoul – Lotte World Tower 79F – Korea:
  - STAY, Modern Restaurant by Yannick Alléno
  - The Lounge of SIGNIEL, casual all-day dining restaurant
  - SIGNIEL Seoul's Pastry Salon, deli shop and dessert
  - Restaurant FRE en Monforte d'Alba (1 étoile par la Guide Michelin ) avec le CEO de REVA RESORT Daniele Scaglia
- Hôtel Hermitage Monte-Carlo:
  - Yannick Alléno à l’Hôtel Hermitage Monte-Carlo, Michelin 1-star

== Michelin-starred restaurants associated with Yannick Alléno and their highest rating ==
Key
| 1 Michelin star | One Michelin star |
| 2 Michelin stars | Two Michelin stars |
| 3 Michelin stars | Three Michelin stars |

| No. | Name | Country | Rating |
|---|---|---|---|
| 1 | Le 1947 à Cheval Blanc (Courchevel) | France | 3 Michelin stars |
| 2 | Yannick Alléno au Pavillon Ledoyen (Paris) | France | 3 Michelin stars |
| 3 | La Table de Pavie (Saint-Emilion) | France | 2 Michelin stars |
| 4 | L'Abysse au Pavillon Ledoyen (Paris) | France | 2 Michelin stars |
| 5 | L'Abysse (Monte-Carlo) | Monaco | 2 Michelin stars |
| 6 | STAY by Yannick Alléno (Dubai) | UAE | 2 Michelin stars |
| 7 | Pavyllon (Paris) | France | 1 Michelin star |
| 8 | Monsieur Dior by Yannick Alléno (Paris) | France | 1 Michelin star |
| 9 | Pavyllon (Monte-Carlo) | Monaco | 1 Michelin star |
| 10 | Pavyllon (London) | England | 1 Michelin star |

== Bibliography ==
- 2006: Quatre saisons à la table N5, Yannick Alléno et Kazuko Masui, Éditions Glénat
- 2009: 1.01 billionéations, Yannick Alléno co-écrit par Kazuko Masui, Éditions Glénat – Prix spécial du jury 2010 Pierre-Christian Taittinger – Antonin Carême
- 2009: Le carnet des tapas des montagnes, Yannick Alléno, Éditions Glénat
- 2010: Terroir Parisien, Yannick Alléno, photos de Jean-François Mallet, Éditions Laymon – Prix La Mazille Beau Livre
- 2013: "Ma Cuisine Française" by Yannick Alléno. The most emblematic book for a whole generation – 1200 pages – €1500
- 2014: Best in the world – Beijing Cookbook fair – May 2014
- 2014: "Sauces, reflections of a chef" by Yannick Alléno
