= Taillevent (restaurant) =

Restaurant in Paris, France

Coordinates: 48°52′26.70″N 02°18′08.85″E

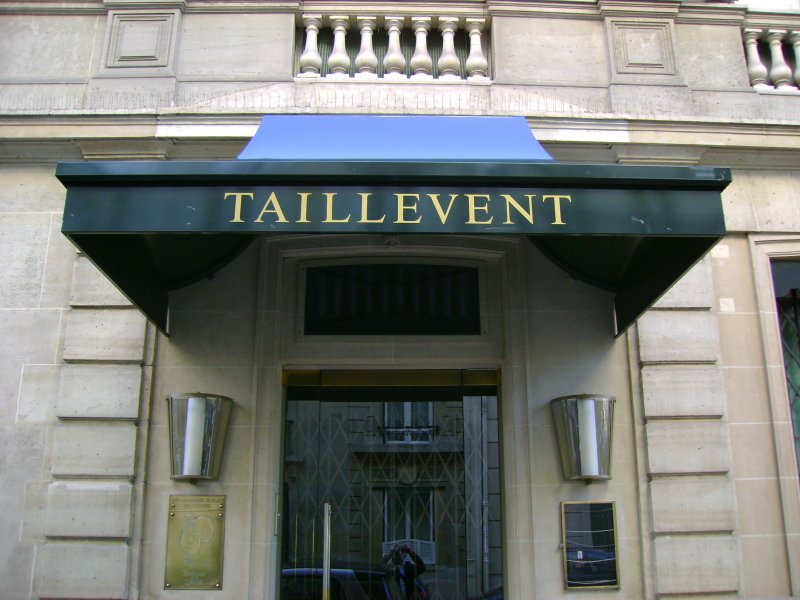
Restaurant "Taillevent" in Paris, France

Taillevent is a restaurant in Paris, founded in 1946 by André Vrinat, and now owned by the Gardinier family.

== Origin ==
The restaurant was named in a tribute to Guillaume Tirel, called Taillevent, a cook in the 14th century known to have written the first cuisine book in French, Le Viandier, ordered by Charles V of France.

== History ==
In 1946 the Taillevent restaurant was founded by André Vrinat in a dining room of the Worms, located in the rue Saint-Georges, 9th arrondissement of Paris; the chef was then Paul Cosnie. In 1948, it won its first star given by the French restaurant guide Guide Michelin. In 1950 the restaurant moved to the mansion of the Duc de Morny, built in 1852, which was a family house before becoming the embassy of Paraguay. The restaurant is located in the rue Lamennais, in the 8th arrondissement of Paris.

In 1954 Taillevent restaurant received its second star under the chef Lucien Leheu. Jean-Claude Vrinat, son of the founder and a graduate of HEC Paris, began working there in 1962. In 1973 the Guide Michelin awarded three stars to Taillevent restaurant, under the direction of the chef Claude Deligne. The restaurant pastry chefs have included Philippe Feret from Brasserie Julien. The chef Philippe Legendre began working at Taillevent in 1991.

Since 1984, Taillevent has been a recipient of the Wine Spectator Grand Award.

The 2026 Guide Michelin called Taillevent a "legendary establishment ... the epitome of French classicism", with "a superb wine list":

Run by the Gardinier family (also owners of Les Crayères in Reims), Taillevent is nothing short of an institution. In the hushed and intimate setting of what used to be the Duke of Morny's private mansion (19C) you feel at a remove from the world outside.

The guide says of the food:

Chef Giuliano Sperandio (previously Christophe Pelé's sous-chef at Le Clarence) is now in charge in the kitchen. On the menu: turbot from small-scale fishing, chanterelles and summer truffles; "Taillevent tradition" langoustine boudin; and veal fillet à la ficelle [i.e. held on a string and supended in hot consommé to poach] , artichoke and periwinkles. The desserts are heavenly, especially the crêpes Suzette, flambéed first with Grand Marnier and then with Cognac.

== Diversification ==
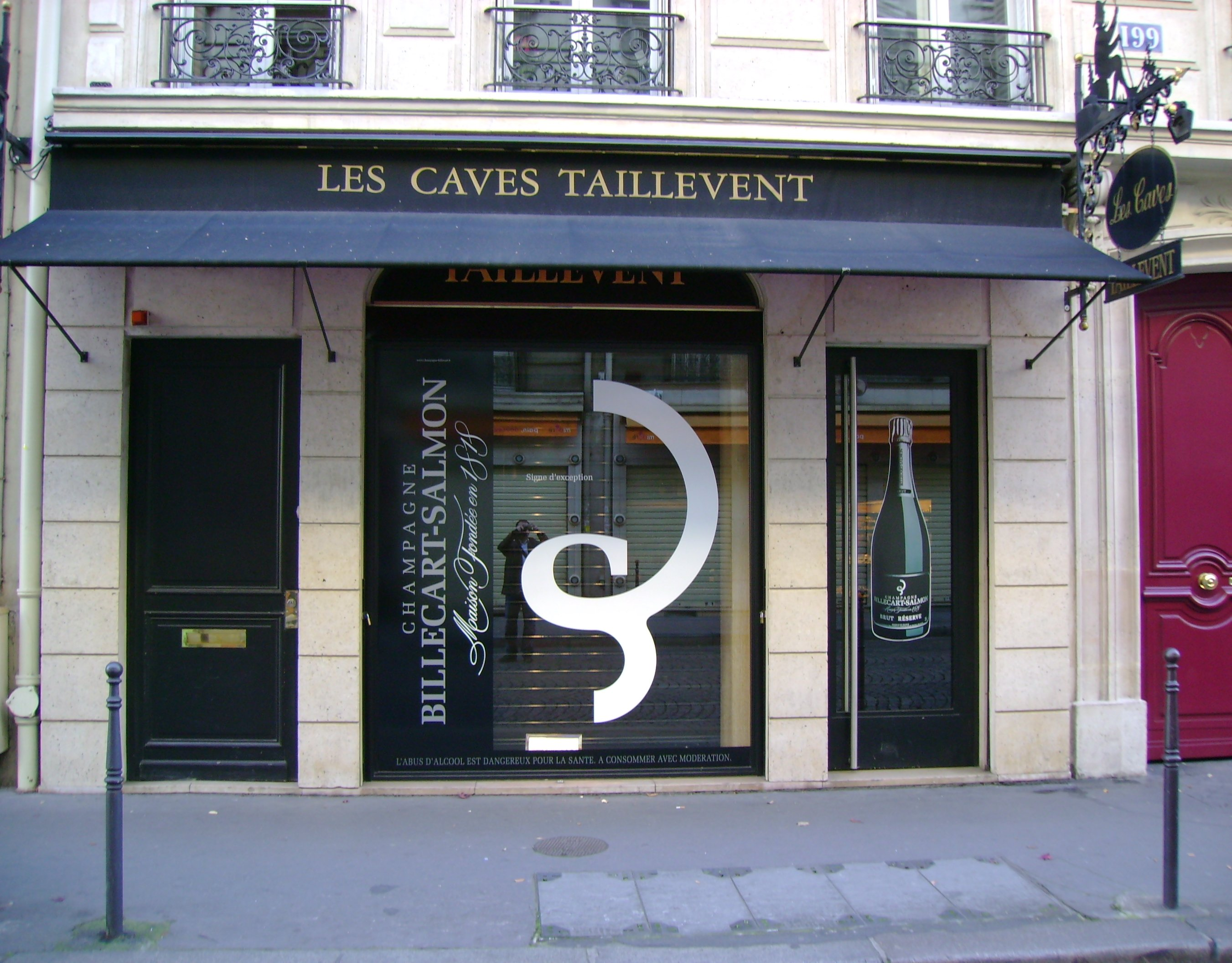
The wine shop "Les Caves Taillevent", n° 199 rue du Faubourg-Saint-Honoré moved to n° 228 in the same street in Paris, France

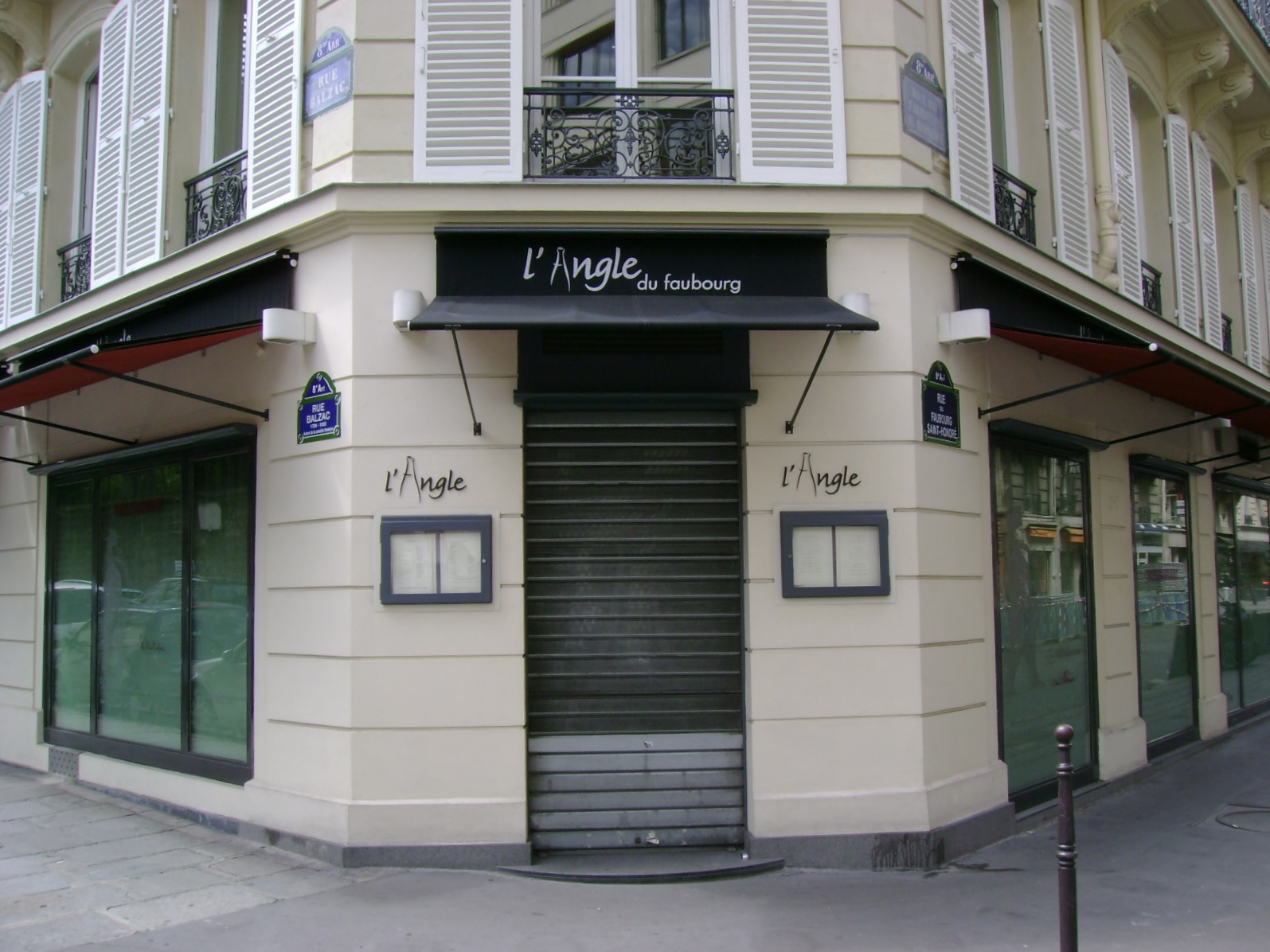
L'Angle du Faubourg now runs under the name Les 110 de Taillevent.

In 1987, Taillevent opened a wine shop, Les Caves Taillevent, at 199 rue du Faubourg Saint-Honoré in Paris. This wine shop was under the direction of Valérine Vrinat, who began to work for Taillevent the same year. It has since been moved to n° 228 in the same street.

In 2001, Taillevent's owners opened another restaurant, L'Angle du Faubourg, located at 195 rue du Faubourg Saint-Honoré. Michel del Burgo left Taillevent's kitchens to lead L'Angle du Faubourg, and was replaced by head chef Alain Solivérès. Alain Lecomte became head pastry cook. This restaurant has since been renamed Les 110 de Taillevent because it offers a choice of 110 wines by the glass. The Guide Michelin describes it as an "ultra-chic brasserie". There is also a 110 de Taillevent in Cavendish Square in London, of which Michelin says:

Ornate high ceilings and deep green banquettes create an elegant look for this formal French restaurant, which is more food orientated than the Paris original. Attractively presented, modern French dishes are accompanied by an exceptional wine list, which includes Château Lafite Rothschild back to 1897 and Château d'Yquem back to 1924. There are also 110 wines available by the glass.

In 2004, Jean-Claude Vrinat decorated the restaurant with contemporary art, and in 2005 Les Caves Taillevent opened a second wine shop at Marunouchi, Tokyo in Japan. There are now (2026) Les Caves de Taillevent wine shops in Paris, Beirut, Tokyo, Osaka and Yokohama, and a wine bar in Tokyo.

In June 2006 Jean-Claude Vrinat launched a blog in order to share his art-of-cooking experiences.

== Troubles ==
On 21 February 2007, Jean-Claude Vrinat announced on his blog the loss of the third star, which was also referred to in the International Herald Tribune newspaper. Vrinat died of lung cancer on 7 January 2008. He was 71 years old.

== List of chefs at Taillevent restaurant ==
- (2021-today) Giuliano Sperandio
- (2020-2021) Jocelyn Herland
- (2018-2020) David Bizet
- (2002-2018) Alain Solivérès
- (2001-2002) Michel del Burgo
- (1991-1999) Philippe Legendre
- (1970-1991) Claude Deligne
- (1950-1970) Lucien Leheu
- (1946-1950) Paul Cosnier
