= Four Seasons Hotel George V =

Luxury hotel in Paris

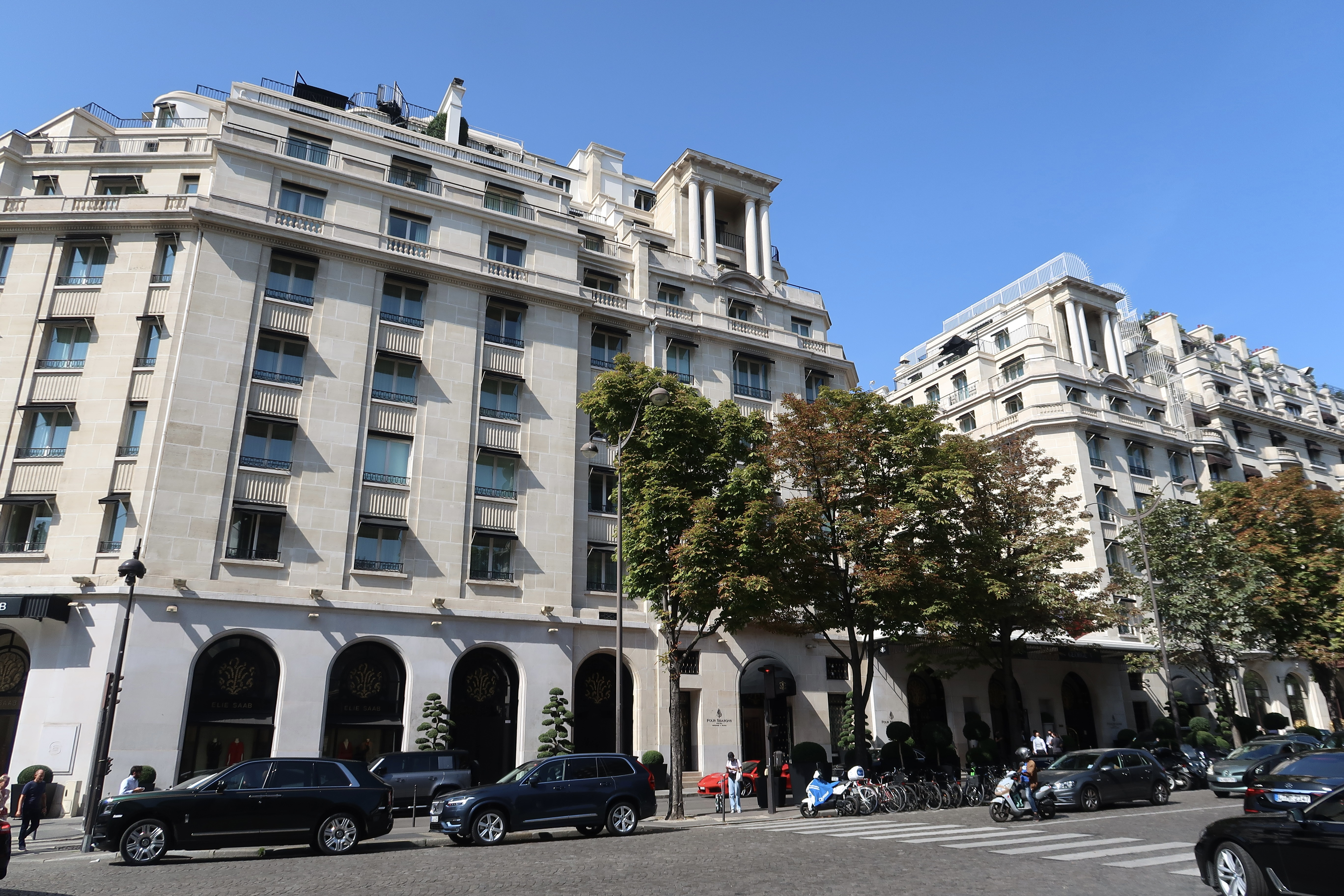

General information
- Location: 31, Avenue George V, Paris, France
- Coordinates: 48°52′8.10″N 2°18′2.11″E
- Opening: 1928
- Owner: Kingdom Holding Company
- Operator: Four Seasons Hotels and Resorts

Other information
- Number of rooms: 244
- Number of suites: 59

Website
- www.fourseasons.com/paris/

Four Seasons Hotel George V (French, historically: Hôtel-George V, [otɛl ʒɔʁʒ(ə) sɛ̃k]) is a luxury hotel on Avenue George V in the 8th arrondissement of Paris. It has some of the most expensive hotel suites in France.

== History ==
The Hotel George V, named for King George V of the United Kingdom, opened in 1928. It was financed, at a cost of $31 million (60 million Francs), by American businessman Joel Hillman. It was managed by restaurateur André Terrail, owner of La Tour d'Argent. Its architect was Georges Wybo, who had designed the Casino de Deauville and the reconstruction of the Printemps Haussmann following the fire of 1921.

The hotel was popular with Americans arriving in France on Transatlantic ocean liners, as it operated offices in the port of Cherbourg to receive customers on their arrival.

Joel Hillman was forced to relinquish the George V to his lenders after the Wall Street crash of 1929. The George V was bought in 1931 by the banker François Dupré and a new wing was built by the original architects, containing apartments that could be rented year-round or seasonally, with the residents enjoying the services of the hotel. Dupré brought many objets d'art to the hotel, including tapestries from Flanders, Boulle furniture, a Renoir and a Dufy.

In World War II, during the German occupation, a "round-table" of French and German intellectuals met at the hotel; including the writer Ernst Jünger, the Nazi legal scholar Carl Schmitt, the publisher Gaston Gallimard and the writers Paul Morand, Jean Cocteau, and Henry Millon de Montherlant.

In 1996 Saudi businessman Al-Waleed bin Talal bought the hotel from the Forte Group, spending $185 million for it. He then spent $120 million renovating the hotel, closing the hotel for two years. He signed a management contract with Four Seasons Hotels and Resorts on November 1, 1997, and the hotel was renamed Four Seasons Hotel George V. The hotel reopened on December 18, 1999. Starting in 2000, the hotel was voted "Best Hotel in the World" by a number of publications. A distinctive feature includes a lobby and walkways lined with floral displays.

== Le Cinq ==
Le Cinq is the hotel's Michelin gourmet restaurant.

== See also ==
- George V (Paris Métro)
- James Bolivar Manson
