= Top Chef (franchise) =

Competitive cooking show television format

Top Chef is a competitive cooking show television format that originated with the American TV show Top Chef, which premiered in March 2006. Licensing of the format is handled by NBCUniversal Television Distribution.

== International versions ==
Current and previous versions of Top Chef include:

Currently airing
No longer airing

Country	Local title	Host(s)	Judges	Channel(s)	Year(s) aired
Brazil	Top Chef Brasil	Felipe Bronze	Emmanuel Bassoleil; Ailin Aleixo (season 1-3); Janaína Torres Rueda (season 4)	RecordTV	2019–2023 (4 seasons)
Canada (in English)	Top Chef Canada	Thea Andrews (season 1); Lisa Ray (season 2–4); Eden Grinshpan (season 5–present)	Mark McEwan; Thea Andrews (season 1); Shereen Arazm (season 1–4); Lisa Ray (season 2–4); Chris Nuttall-Smith (season 5–10); Mijune Pak (season 5–present); Janet Zuccarini (season 5–present); David Zilber (season 10–present)	Food Network Canada; Flavour Network	2011–2014, 2017–present
Canada (in English)	Top Chef Canada: The Dessert Table	Eden Grinshpan	Chanthy Yen; Patrice Demers	Flavour Network	2027
Chile	Top Chef	Julián Elfenbein	Carlo Von Mühlenbrock; Pamela Fidalgo; Ciro Watanabe	TVN	2014 (1 season)
Chile	Top Chef VIP Chile	Cristian Riquelme	Sergi Arola; Fernanda Fuentes; Benjamin Nast	Chilevisión	2024–2025
El Salvador	Top Chef El Salvador	Marcela Santamaria	Marta Elena García; Roberto Sartogo; Jay Bruzon (season 1); Lorenzo Álvarez (season 2)	TCS	2015–2017 (3 seasons)
Finland	Top Chef Suomi	Pipsa Hurmerinta	Pia Kämppi; Hans Välimäki	MTV Sub	2011–2013 (3 seasons)
France Belgium (in French)	Top Chef	Stéphane Rotenberg; Sandrine Corman (season 1); Agathe Lecaron (season 2)	Ghislaine Arabian (season 1–5); Christian Constant (season 1–5); Cyril Lignac (season 1–5); Thierry Marx (season 1–5); Jean-François Piège (season 1–10); Hélène Darroze (season 6–present); Philippe Etchebest (season 6–present); Michel Sarran (season 6–12); Paul Pairet (season 11–present); Glenn Viel (season 13-present); Stéphanie Le Quellec (season 15-present); Dominique Crenn (season 15); Pierre Gagnaire (season 15); Eric Frechon (season 16); Fabien Ferré (season 16)	M6; RTL-TVI	2010–present
France Belgium (in French)	Objectif Top Chef	Philippe Etchebest	Philippe Etchebest	M6; RTL-TVI	2014–2023 (9 seasons)
Germany	Top Chef Germany	Daniel Boschmann	Eckart Witzigmann; Alexandra Killian; Peter Maria Schnurr	Sat.1	2019 (1 season)
Greece	Top Chef	Nadia Boule	Elias Mamalakis; Christophoros Peskias; Apostolos Trastelis; Herve Pronzato	ANT1	2010 (1 season)
Greece	Top Chef	N/A	Giorgos Venieris; Gkikas Xenakis; Asterios Koustoudis	Skai TV	2021 (1 season)
Indonesia	Top Chef Indonesia	Farah Quinn	Will Meyrick; Henry Alexie Bloem; Chris Salans; Vindex Tengker	SCTV	2013 (1 season)
Italy	Top Chef Italia	N/A	Annie Féolde; Mauro Colagreco; Giuliano Baldessari; Moreno Cedroni (season 1)	NOVE	2016–2017 (2 seasons)
Mexico	Top Chef México	Ana Claudia Talancón	Aquiles Chávez; Guillermo González Beristáin; Martha Ortíz; Juantxo Sánchez	Canal Sony; NBC Universo	2016–2017 (2 seasons)
Middle East and North Africa	توب شيف (Top Chef)	Siham Tueni (season 1); Jumana Murad (season 2)	Joe Barza	LBC; Rotana Masriya	2011–2012 (2 seasons)
Middle East and North Africa	توب شيف (Top Chef)	Mona Mosly	Bobby Chinn; Maroun Chedid	MBC 1 MBC Masr 2 LBCI	2016–present
Middle East and North Africa	توب شيف VIP (Top Chef VIP)	Mona Mosly	Bobby Chinn; Maroun Chedid	MBC 1	TBA
Mongolia	Top Chef Mongolia	Khulan	Demi; Taivan; Enkhee	NTV	2026–present
Netherlands	Topchef	Martijn Krabbé	Robert Kranenborg; Julius Jaspers	RTL Nederland	2009–2012 (7 seasons)
Panama	Top Chef Panamá	Karen Guerra; Arturo Illueca	Charlie Collins; Pedro Masoliver	Telemetro	2016–2019 (4 seasons)
Panama	Top Chef Junior	Delyanne Arjona	?	Telemetro	2019 (1 season)
Poland	Top Chef	Grzegorz Łapanowski	Wojciech Modest Amaro; Maciej Nowak; Ewa Wachowicz; Grzegorz Łapanowski (season 3–6); Robert Sowa (season 7); Joseph Seelesto (season 1–2)	Polsat	2013–2016, 2018 (7 seasons)
Poland	Top Chef. Gwiazdy od Kuchni	Maciej Rock	Wojciech Modest Amaro; Maciej Nowak; Ewa Wachowicz	Polsat	2016 (1 season)
Portugal	Top Chef	Silvia Alberto	José Cordeiro; Susana Felicidade; Ricardo Costa	RTP1	2012 (1 season)
Romania	Top Chef România	Alina Pușcaș	Tudor Constantinescu; Joseph Hadad; Nicolai Tand	Antena 1	2012–2014 (2 seasons)
Romania	Junior Chef	Roxana Ionescu	Horia Vîrlan; Anca Lungu; Marius Vizante	Antena 1	2014 (1 season)
South Africa (in English)	Top Chef South Africa	Lorna Maseko	Neill Anthony; Lesego Semenya	SABC 3	2016 (1 season)
Spain	Top Chef	N/A	Alberto Chicote; Susi Díaz; Angel León (season 1); Yayo Daporta (season 2); Paco Roncero (season 3–4)	Antena 3	2013–2017 (4 seasons)
Spain	Top Chef: Dulces y Famosos (Top Chef VIP: Just Desserts)	Paula Vázquez	Eva Arguiñano; Osvaldo Groos; Paco Roncero	La 1	2026–present
Sweden	Köksmästarna (Top Chef)	N/A	Johan Jureskog; Paul Svensson; Karin Fransson	Kanal 5	2014 (1 season)
Thailand	ท็อปเชฟไทยแลนด์ (Top Chef Thailand)	Pitipat Kutragule (season 1-3)	Willment Leong; Suphamongkhon Suppipat; Thidid Tadsanakajon; Phichaya Uthantam	ONE31; Channel 7 HD	2017–2020, 2023 (4 seasons)
Thailand	ท็อปเชฟไทยแลนด์ ขนมหวาน (Top Chef Thailand Desserts)	Kathaleeya McIntosh	Penny Jirayuwatana; Chatchaya Raktakanit; Kanok Chaowalitpong	ONE31	2020 (1 season)
United States	Top Chef	Katie Lee (season 1); Padma Lakshmi (season 2-20); Kristen Kish (season 21-present)	Tom Colicchio; Gail Simmons (season 1-15, 17-present); Ted Allen (season 3–4); Toby Young (season 5–6); Eric Ripert (season 7); Anthony Bourdain (season 8); Hugh Acheson (season 9-12); Emeril Lagasse (season 9-11, 13); Wolfgang Puck (season 10); Richard Blais (season 12-14); Graham Elliot (season 14-16); Nilou Motamed (season 16)	Bravo	2006–present
United States	Top Chef Masters	Kelly Choi (season 1–2); Curtis Stone (season 3–5)	James Oseland; Gail Simmons (season 1–2, 5); Jay Rayner (season 1–2); Gael Greene (season 1–3); Ruth Reichl (season 3–5); Francis Lam (season 4–5); Krista Simmons (season 4); Lesley Suter (season 5)	Bravo	2009–13 (5 seasons)
United States	Top Chef: Just Desserts	Gail Simmons	Johnny Iuzzini; Hubert Keller; Dannielle Kyrillos	Bravo	2010–11 (2 seasons)
United States	Top Chef Duels	Curtis Stone	Gail Simmons	Bravo	2014 (1 season)
United States	Top Chef Estrellas	Aylín Mújica	Lorena Garcia; Jaime Martín Del Campo; Ramiro Arvizu	Telemundo	2014 (1 season)
United States	Top Chef Junior	Vanessa Lachey	Curtis Stone; Gail Simmons; Tiffany Derry; Antonia Lofaso; Graham Elliot	Universal Kids	2017–2018 (2 seasons)
United States	Top Chef Amateurs	Gail Simmons	Eric Adjepong; Richard Blais; Jennifer Carroll; Shirley Chung; Stephanie Cmar; Tiffany Derry; Joe Flamm; Gregory Gourdet; Melissa King; Kwame Onwuachi; Dale Talde; Isaac Toups	Bravo	2021 (1 season)
United States	Top Chef Family Style	Meghan Trainor	Marcus Samuelsson	Peacock	2021 (1 season)
United States	Top Chef VIP	Carmen Villalobos	Antonio de Livier; Adria Marina Montaño (season 1–2); Juan Manuel Barrientos (season 1–2); Inés Páez Nin (season 3-present); Belén Alonso (season 3); Betty Vázquez (season 4-present)	Telemundo	2022–present
Vietnam	Đầu Bếp Đỉnh (Top Chef Vietnam)	Thúy Hạnh	Robert Danhi; Anh Lê; Alain Nguyen	HTV7	2014–2015 (1 season)
Vietnam	Đầu Bếp Thượng Đỉnh (Top Chef Vietnam)	Khả Như; Đại Nghĩa	Trịnh Diễm Vy; Jack Lee; Dương Huy Khải	HTV7	2019 (1 season)
Vietnam	Đầu Bếp Thượng Đỉnh (Top Chef Vietnam)	H'Hen Niê	Luke Nguyen; Alain Nguyen	VTV3	2023 (1 season)
Vietnam	Đầu Bếp Thượng Đỉnh (Top Chef Vietnam)	Phương Linh	Sakal Phoeung; Kim Oanh; Valentin Trần	VTV3	2026–present
