= Top Chef (French TV series) =

- Also known as: Top Chef France
- Genre: Reality competition; Cooking show
- Presented by: Stéphane Rotenberg; Sandrine Corman; Agathe Lecaron
- Judges: Jean-François Piège; Ghislaine Arabian; Christian Constant; Thierry Marx; Cyril Lignac; Michel Sarran; Hélène Darroze; Philippe Etchebest; Paul Pairet; Glenn Viel; Stéphanie Le Quellec; Dominique Crenn; Pierre Gagnaire; Éric Frechon; Fabien Ferré; Yoann Conte
- Country of origin: France
- Original language: French
- No. of seasons: 17

Production
- Production company: Studio 89 Productions

Original release
- Network: M6 (France); RTL-TVI (Belgium)
- Release: 22 February 2010 – present

Top Chef, also known as Top Chef France, is a French culinary reality television series and an adaptation of the American television series of the same name. The show is produced by Studio 89 Productions and debuted in February 2010. It airs in France and Belgium on M6 and RTL-TVI, respectively. The format of the French version differs significantly from the original American version in terms of challenge structure and length. The French version is also recognized by NBC as the most successful iteration of the Top Chef franchise in terms of viewership.

== Format ==
In Top Chef, a group of professional chefs compete against one another in a series of culinary and gastronomic challenges. One or more contestants are eliminated by the judging panel in each episode until the finale, where the two finalists must create and serve their own multi-course menus for the judges and 100 guest diners, who vote for a winner. For the first four seasons, the winner received a flat €100,000 prize. From the fifth season onward, the winner is instead awarded a cash prize proportional to the number of votes they received. For example, the winner of the tenth season, Samuel Albert, won with 53.08% of the vote, netting him €53,080.

During its first few seasons, each episode typically consisted of three parts: the Épreuve Coup de Feu (French for 'Rush Challenge'), a short, high-pressure test that awards an advantage to the winning chef(s), such as immunity from elimination; the Épreuve des Chefs (French for 'Chefs' Challenge'), a longer, more substantive test that determines who qualifies for next week; and the Épreuve de la Dernière Chance (French for 'Last Chance Challenge'), where the contestants who did not qualify compete head-to-head and the person with the weakest dish is eliminated from the competition. The show then moved away from this specific format, eventually implementing a brigade-style system in its eighth season, which has remained ever since. In the brigade system, the contestants are drafted into teams, each led by one or more of the main judges. The brigade leaders act as mentors for their team members throughout the competition, observing them cook, offering advice, and providing support.

Another major difference between the French and American series is episode length. While the episodes of the American version range from 45 to 60 minutes, French episodes span two hours or more. The slower pacing gives the contestants more time to cook during challenges, explain cooking techniques to the audience, include in-depth interviews with the chefs, and feature longer segments of judging deliberations, among other things. According to Studio 89 Productions, the decision to depart from the original series' format, in both structure and length, was made at the very beginning. Due to the differences in food cultures between France and the United States, NBC was willing to give Studio 89 more creative freedom with the Top Chef license. This has allowed the producers to introduce new challenges and twists nearly every season to help keep the series fresh.

== Seasons ==
Season	Winner	Runner-up	Original air dates
1	Romain Tischenko	Pierre Augé	22 February – 5 April 2010
2	Stéphanie Le Quellec	Fanny Rey	31 January – 4 April 2011
3	Jean Imbert	Cyrille Zen	30 January – 9 April 2012
4	Naoëlle D'Hainaut	Florent Ladeyn	4 February – 29 April 2013
5	Pierre Augé	Thibault Sombardier	20 January – 21 April 2014
6	Xavier Koenig	Kévin D'Andrea	26 January – 13 April 2015
7	Xavier Pincemin	Coline Faulquier	25 January – 18 April 2016
8	Jérémie Izarn	Franck Pelux	25 January – 19 April 2017
9	Camille Delcroix	Victor Mercier	31 January – 25 April 2018
10	Samuel Albert	Guillaume Pape	6 February – 8 May 2019
11	David Gallienne	Adrien Cachot	19 February – 17 June 2020
12	Mohamed Cheikh	Sarah Mainguy	10 February – 9 June 2021
13	Louise Bourrat	Arnaud Delvenne	16 February – 15 June 2022
14	Hugo Riboulet	Danny Khezzar	1 March – 7 June 2023
15	Jorick Dorignac	Clotaire Poirier	13 March – 19 June 2024
16	Quentin Mauro	Charlie Anne	26 March – 2 July 2025
17	Viviana Pisacane	Alexy Algar-Denos	4 March – 10 June 2026
