= Emmanuel Renaut =

French chef

- Born: 26 January 1968 (age 58); Soisy-sous-Montmorency, Val d'Oise, France
- Culinary career
- Cooking style: Haute cuisine
- Rating
- Michelin stars
- Current restaurants
- Flocons de sel (Megève); Flocons Village (Megève); Le Prieuré (Megève); Auberge de Bois Prin (Chamonix); Le Boitet (Saint Gervais)
- Website: emmanuelrenaut.com

Emmanuel Renaut (born 26 January 1968) is a French chef, who received the Meilleur Ouvrier de France in 2004. A former sous-chef of Marc Veyrat, he then founded his own restaurant Flocons de sel at Mégève, which holds three Michelin stars.

== Life and career ==
Born in Soisy-sous-Montmorency in the department of Val d'Oise, Emmanuel Renaut grew up in the department of Aisne. During his childhood, he got interested in mountain and skiing during trips at Les Houches in Haute-Savoie. He made his military service at Chambéry with the Chasseurs Alpins.

He joined the CFA of Laon in 1984, training in Étouvelles and then in Paris. He joined the team of the Hôtel Le Lotti and then worked for Christian Constant at the Hôtel de Crillon as a first cooking assistant. He was then hired temporarily by Marc Veyrat, head chef of the Auberge de l'Eridan in Veyrier-du-Lac, and became a sous-chef for four years. He then worked with the cooking and pastry chef Yves Thuriès and later in London where he was for one year the head chef of Claridge's.

In 1998, Emmanuel Renaut established himself in Mégève in Haute-Savoie and founded his own restaurant Flocons de sel. He received his first Michelin star in 2003, the second one in 2006, and his third in 2012. In 2007, he published La Montagne et le cuisinier with Isabelle Hintzy and Catherine de Montalembert.

In 2012, Emmanuel Renaut was named "Cooking Chef of the Year", succeeding to Jean-François Piège (2011), Gilles Goujon (2010), Éric Fréchon (2009), Yannick Alléno (2008) and Anne-Sophie Pic (2007).

== Cooking style ==
For the food critic Gilles Pudlowski, Emmanuel Renaut belongs to a "new generation of chef who re-invent the local products with malice", which brings him closer from chef Alain Passard. François Simon estimates his cooking style "very close from the Savoyard local products". The chief redactor of the Guide Michelin Juliane Caspar qualifies his style of "very subtle" and find his compositions very "surprising and harmonious".

== Personal life ==
The family of Emmanuel Renaut is from Picardy. His mother Bernadette Clément owns a gîte in Coucy-lès-Eppes, Aisne. He met his wife Kristine during his trip in London. She works at the secretary of the Claridge's. They have three children.

== Books ==
- Emmanuel Renaut and Catherine de Montalembert, La Montagne et le cuisinier, Aubanel, 2007, 229 pages (ISBN 9782700604641)

== See also ==
- List of Michelin starred restaurants
