= Yann Couvreur =

French pastry chef

Yann Couvreur is a French pastry chef. He owns several pastry stores in Paris.

== Early life and education ==
After his third year of middle-school, he decided to take a BEP (Brevet d'Etudes Professionnelles - French professionalizing diploma) in cooking. He then pursued a CAP (Certificat d'Etudes Professionnelles - French professionalizing diploma) to deepen his knowledge in pastry at the Tecomah training center in Jouy-en-Josas.

Then, he joined the restaurant Le Trianon Palace in Versailles as head chef. He was then hired by Gérard Vié in the double starred establishment Les Trois Marches also in Versailles.

== Career as a pastry chef ==
In 2008, Yann Couvreur departed for Saint-Barthélemy, and integrated the hotel Eden Rock as a pastry chef.

After two years, he returned to metropolitan France and took over the pastry shop at the hotel Le Burgundy, located not far from the Place de la Madeleine in Paris.

In 2013, he joined the hotel Le Prince de Galles in the 8th arrondissement of Paris, rue Georges V, as head pastry chef. He accompanied the chef Stéphanie Le Quellec for the reopening of this institution after two years of renovation.

In 2015, he was approached by M6 (TV channel) to participate in the program Top Chef as a jury during one of the tests.

His signature dessert is the vanilla mille-feuilles from Madagascar. It received the Dessert of the Year prize by the Lebey guide in 2014.

In 2016, he created the pastries for a meal served on board the Orient Express with his partner, chef Yannick Alléno.

In 2017, he created a 4.5 meter high sculpture in honor of the fox in collaboration with Richard Orlinski at the Salon du Chocolat.

== Pastry stores ==
Yann Couvreur has several pastry stores in the 11th arrondissement of Paris, in the Marais, in the Galeries Lafayette and at the Gare Montparnasse. He also opened two stores in Dubai.

== Books ==
- La pâtisserie de Yann Couvreur, 2017
- La pâtisserie de Yann Couvreur pour les enfants, 2020
- Ephemere - Les desserts a l'assiette, 2019
