= Christian Etchebest =

French chef

- Born: February 17, 1969 (age 57); Pau, Béarn, France
- Education: Trained under chef Christian Constant
- Culinary career
- Cooking style: French cuisine, bistronomy
- Rating
- Michelin star (for some of his restaurants)
- Current restaurants
- La Cantine du Troquet; La Cantine de la Cigale; La Cantine de la Section (Pau)
- Previous restaurant
- Le Troquet (Paris)
- Television shows
- Bon et à savoir; La Plus Belle Région de France; MasterChef France
- Website: www.lacantinedutroquet.com

Christian Etchebest (French pronunciation: [kʁistjɑ̃ ɛtʃɛbɛst]; born on February 17, 1969), is a French chef, television personality, and advocate for French cuisine. Born in Pau, Béarn, he is recognized for his bistronomic (a fusion of traditional French bistro-style dining with modern, gourmet cuisine) approach to cooking. Etchebest has played an important role in shaping French culinary television and owns several restaurants.

He is a fan of Section Paloise, his local rugby team, and is the uncle of Thibault Daubagna.

Although both have the surname, Christian is not related to Philippe Etchebest, another well-known French chef and television personality who hosts the television show Cauchemar en cuisine (Kitchen Nightmares in its French version).

== Early life ==
Christian Etchebest grew up in Pau, the capital of the Béarn region of southwestern France, known for its rich culinary traditions and proximity to the Pyrenees mountains. From a young age he was exposed to the food culture of his region, which sparked his interest in cooking. As a child, he grew up attending Stade de la Croix du Prince and became a fan of Robert Paparemborde.

=== Chef career ===
Etchebest's career began in the kitchens of prestigious French restaurants. He honed his skills in some of the country's most celebrated kitchens, including at the Grand Hôtel in Saint-Jean-de-Luz, a coastal town known for its Basque cuisine; the Miramar in Biarritz; and the Hôtel Martinez in Cannes. These early experiences laid the foundation for his culinary philosophy and helped him develop his skills as a chef.

In Paris, Etchebest worked at the Hôtel de Crillon, one of the most famous and historic luxury hotels in the city. During this period, he trained under Christian Constant, gaining exposure to both classical French techniques and innovative approaches to cuisine. Etchebest's time at these establishments allowed him to refine his craft and build a reputation as a chefs.

In 1998, Etchebest opened his first restaurant, Le Troquet, in Paris, which quickly gained recognition. The restaurant was awarded the "Bistro of the Year" title by the Pudlo Guide, a French restaurant guide. Le Troquet became known for its classic bistro dishes with a contemporary twist. Building on this success, he later opened additional locations under the La Cantine du Troquet brand, including La Cantine du Troquet Pernety and La Cantine du Troquet Dupleix in 2012, offering a combination of refined French bistro fare and innovative techniques. His culinary style blends traditional bistro food with gourmet ingredients and modern culinary trends.

=== Television career ===
Etchebest also became a familiar face on French television.

In 2005, he co-hosted, alongside Jean-Pierre Coffe and chef Caroline Rostang, Panique en cuisine ("Panic in the Kitchen"). The show attempted to adapt the British series Ramsay's Kitchen Nightmares to a French audience. However, the two episodes were a failure.

In 2008, Etchebest returned to M6 as the host of Bon et à savoir ("Good to Know"), a food-focused show that aimed to educate viewers about French cuisine and gastronomy. He remained a fixture of French culinary television until 2010, when the show ended. At the same time,M6 revived Cauchemar en cuisine , which would go on to feature Philippe Etchebest as the host.

In 2013, while Kronenbourg chose Philippe Etchebest as their ambassador, Etchebest was approached by Dutch company Heineken to become their brand ambassador.

The same year, he joined the culinary advisory team at La Cantine de la Cigale, a restaurant next to the La Cigale concert hall in Paris.

In 2014, Etchebest appeared as a judge on the French version of MasterChef, where he evaluated amateur chefs and offered his expertise in various cooking challenges. His authoritative yet encouraging approach made him a respected member of the panel.

=== Recent developments ===
In 2019, during the Gilets Jaunes, Yellow vests protests, Etchebest's Porsche sports car was set on fire.

Etchebest is a member of the steering committee of the Observatoire de l’Obésité (Obobs), an organization focused on combating obesity and promoting healthy eating. He is also a patron of the Fédération Française de Cuisine Amateur (French Federation of Amateur Cooking), where he encourages cooking education and the appreciation of French culinary traditions.

In September 2023, Etchebest participated in the opening ceremony of the 2023 Rugby World Cup, taking part in the "La Chistera" segment, which celebrated the cultural significance of the Basque region in French rugby.

== Personal life and interests ==
Etchebest is a supporter of his local rugby team, Section Paloise.

He also co-founded in 2017 another restaurant, La Cantine de la Section, the official restaurant of Section Paloise in his hometown (his first ever restaurant in his native Béarn), in collaboration with another chef, Jean-Bernard Hourçourigaray.

His son Peio Etchebestest trained at the Stade Français academy.

== Publications ==
Etchebest has written several books about approach to French cuisine.

- Tout est bon dans le cochon ("Everything is Good in the Pig") (2013) – Co-authored with Éric Ospital, this book explores Basque culinary traditions, focusing on the versatility of the pig as an ingredient.
- La Cantine du Troquet (2015) – A cookbook inspired by his restaurants.
