= Virginie Basselot =

French chef (born 1979)

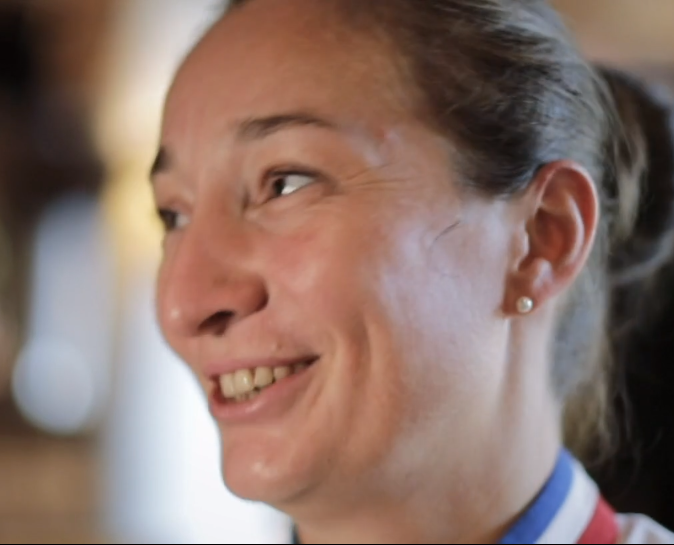
- in 2019
- Born: April 21, 1979 (age 45); Deauville, Normandy, France
- Culinary career
- Rating(s): Michelin stars
- Current restaurant(s): La Réserve Genève
- Previous restaurant(s): Saint James Paris
- Award(s) won: Meilleur Ouvrier de France; Gault Millau Chef of the Year 2017

Virginie Basselot (born 21 April 1979) is a French chef de cuisine who held one Michelin star at the restaurant within the Saint James Paris hotel. She became the second woman to be named to the title of Meilleur Ouvrier de France. In 2017, after moving to become executive chef at La Réserve Genève during the previous year, she was named Chef of the Year by the restaurant guide Gault Millau. At the moment she is working in the Hotel Negresco in Nice.

== Biography ==
Virginie Basselot was born on 21 April 1979 in Deauville, Normandy, France. As a teenager, she pursued a culinary career, following in her father's career as a chef although also had ambitions to become a fighter pilot. Basselot undertook an apprenticeship in Normandy at the age of 15. She then moved to Paris at the age of 19 where she worked at several restaurants. These included under chef Éric Fréchon at Hôtel Le Bristol Paris, Dominique Bouchet at Hôtel de Crillon and Guy Martin at Le Grand Véfour.

She began working at the restaurant within the Saint James Paris hotel in 2012 as executive chef, where she was awarded a Michelin star in 2014. Basselot created the signature of the restaurant, cod in a lemon balm butter with seasonal vegetables on a layer of tapioca. The following year, she was named to the Meilleur Ouvrier de France. This was only the second occasion that a woman was named to the title since it began in 1924.

Basselot left Saint James Paris in October 2016, to become executive chef at La Réserve Genève on Lake Geneva in Switzerland. In 2017, she was named Chef of the Year by the Swiss restaurant guide Gault Millau.
