= WPTC =

WPTC may refer to:

- Former call sign of WKWP, a Christian radio station
- A defunct radio station in Elsah, Illinois
- World Pastry Team Championship, in Stéphane Tréand
- Wireless Power Transfer Conference, in Online Electric Vehicle
- World Processing Tomato Council
- Williamsport Preservation Training Center, under the National Park Service, in Matthew Jones House
- WikiProject Tropical cyclones
