= Mandarin Oriental, Paris =

Luxury hotel in Paris

Coordinates: 48.8671°N 2.3270°E

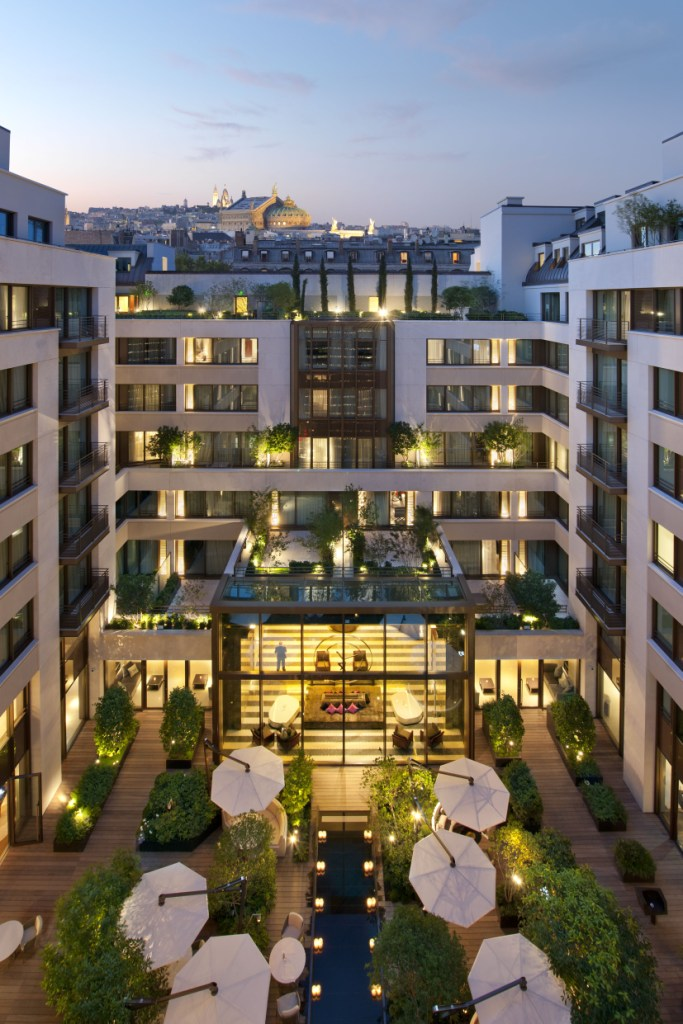
- Interior Courtyard of Mandarin Oriental, Paris
- Interactive map of the Mandarin Oriental, Paris area

General information
- Location: 251 Rue Saint-Honoré, 75001 Paris, France
- Opening: 2011; 15 years ago
- Owner: Gruppo Statuto
- Operator: Mandarin Oriental Hotel Group

Design and construction
- Architect: Jean-Michel Wilmotte

Other information
- Number of rooms: 96
- Number of suites: 39
- Number of restaurants: 4

Website
- Mandarin Oriental, Paris

The Mandarin Oriental, Paris is a five-star luxury hotel located in central Paris. The 135-room hotel opened in June 2011 as part of the Mandarin Oriental Hotel Group. The hotel has 3 restaurants and bars, and a cake shop led by Chef Thierry Marx.

== Location ==
Mandarin Oriental, Paris is located in the 1st arrondissement of Paris on Rue Saint-Honoré, near Place Vendôme as well as the Tuileries Garden.

== Hotel ==
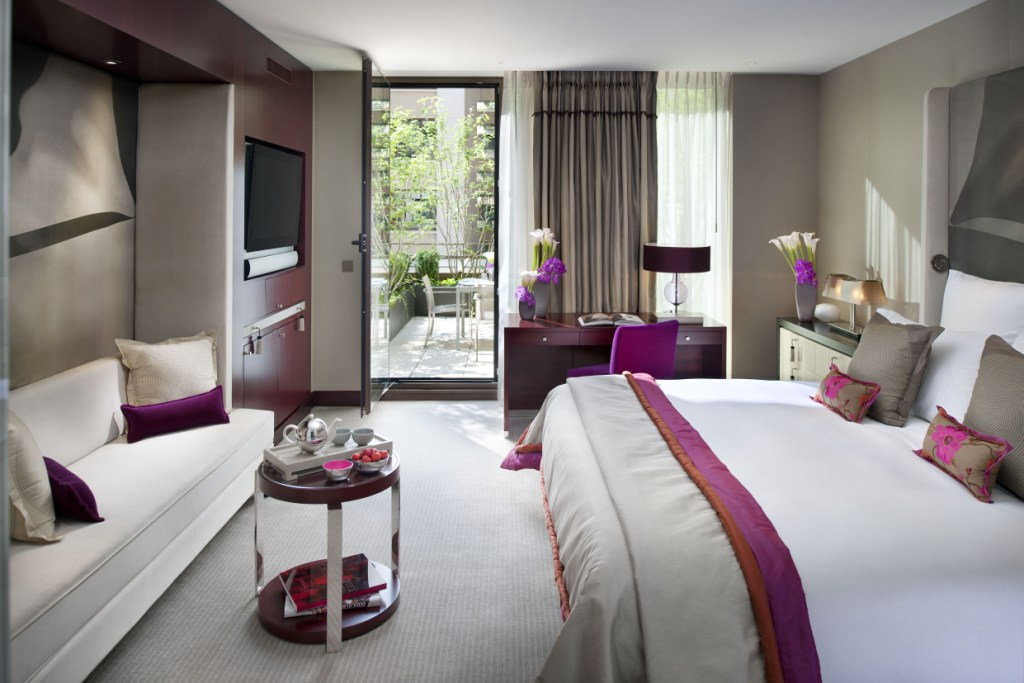
Mandarin Oriental, Paris: Mandarin Terrace Room

The hotel has 96 guest rooms and 39 suites, with notable figures involved in the design of the space: Sybille de Margerie designed the guest rooms, suites, public spaces and The Spa, with furniture designed by Bruno de Caumont. Designers Patrick Jouin and Sanjit Manku oversaw the bar and restaurants design, while the architect Jean-Michel Wilmotte was in charge of restoring of the building's art deco façade. Additionally, the indoor garden was created by Wilmotte & Associés, in cooperation with landscape artists François Neveux and Bernard Rouyer.

The hotel's restaurants are led by Thierry Marx. Six months after opening, the signature restaurant "Sur Mesure by Thierry Marx" was awarded two stars in the 2012 Michelin Guide. Chef Marx also oversees the restaurant Camelia, as well as Bar 8 and the Cake Shop.

=== Spa ===
The Spa at Mandarin Oriental, Paris is one of the largest spas in the city. Inside, the spa has four single treatment suites. Hotel guests also have access to a hammam, a 14 m (46 ft) pool, and a fitness center.

== Awards ==
- First and Only Hotel Certified High Quality Environment and Sustainability (Certivea, French Government Organization)
- Best Business Hotel 2011 (Wallpaper Magazine, 2011)
- The Hot List 2012 (Condé Nast Traveler, 2012)
- Top 25 New Hotels & Resorts for Couples (Holidays for Couples, The 2012 Romance List)
- Sur Mesure par Thierry Marx: Two Michelin Stars (Michelin Guide 2012)
- Sur Mesure par Thierry Marx: Best New Restaurant (Wallpaper Magazine, Design Awards 2012)
- Sur Mesure par Thierry Marx and Restaurant Camélia: Best Restaurant (Travel + Leisure, 2012 Design Awards)
- As of June 2022, among over 1,500 Google Reviews the Mandarin Oriental has a rating of 4.6/5
- According to TripAdvisor in June, 2022, the Mandarin Oriental Hotel was ranked #188 of 1883 hotels in Paris
