= Cristián Flores =

Chilean footballer (born 1972)

Personal information
- Full name: Cristián Antonio Flores Vásquez
- Date of birth: 5 March 1972 (age 54)
- Place of birth: Valparaíso, Chile
- Height: 1.79 m (5 ft 10 1/2 in)
- Position: Defender

Senior career*
Years	Team	Apps	(Gls)
1990–1998	Santiago Wanderers		
1998	Everton		
1999	Santiago Morning		
2000	Colo-Colo		
2001	Atlante		
2001	Irapuato	3	(0)

International career
1997–2000	Chile	4	(0)
- * Club domestic league appearances and goals

Cristián Antonio Flores Vásquez (born 5 March 1972) is a Chilean former professional footballer who played as a defender.

He played for Chilean and Mexican clubs while representing the Chile national team at international level.

== Personal life ==
Flores is better known by his nickname Pistola (Gun) what was given when he was a child due to the fact that he wanted a toy gun for Christmas and his mother gave him a carved wooden gun.

He is the father of the professional footballer Kevin Flores.

He started a football academy in Valparaíso called Pistola Flores like him what generated controversies due to the fact that the logo have a gun.

In 2017, he took part of the season 3 of the TV program Masterchef Chile.

== Honours ==
Santiago Wanderers

- Segunda División: 1995
