= Thibault Daubagna =

French rugby union footballer

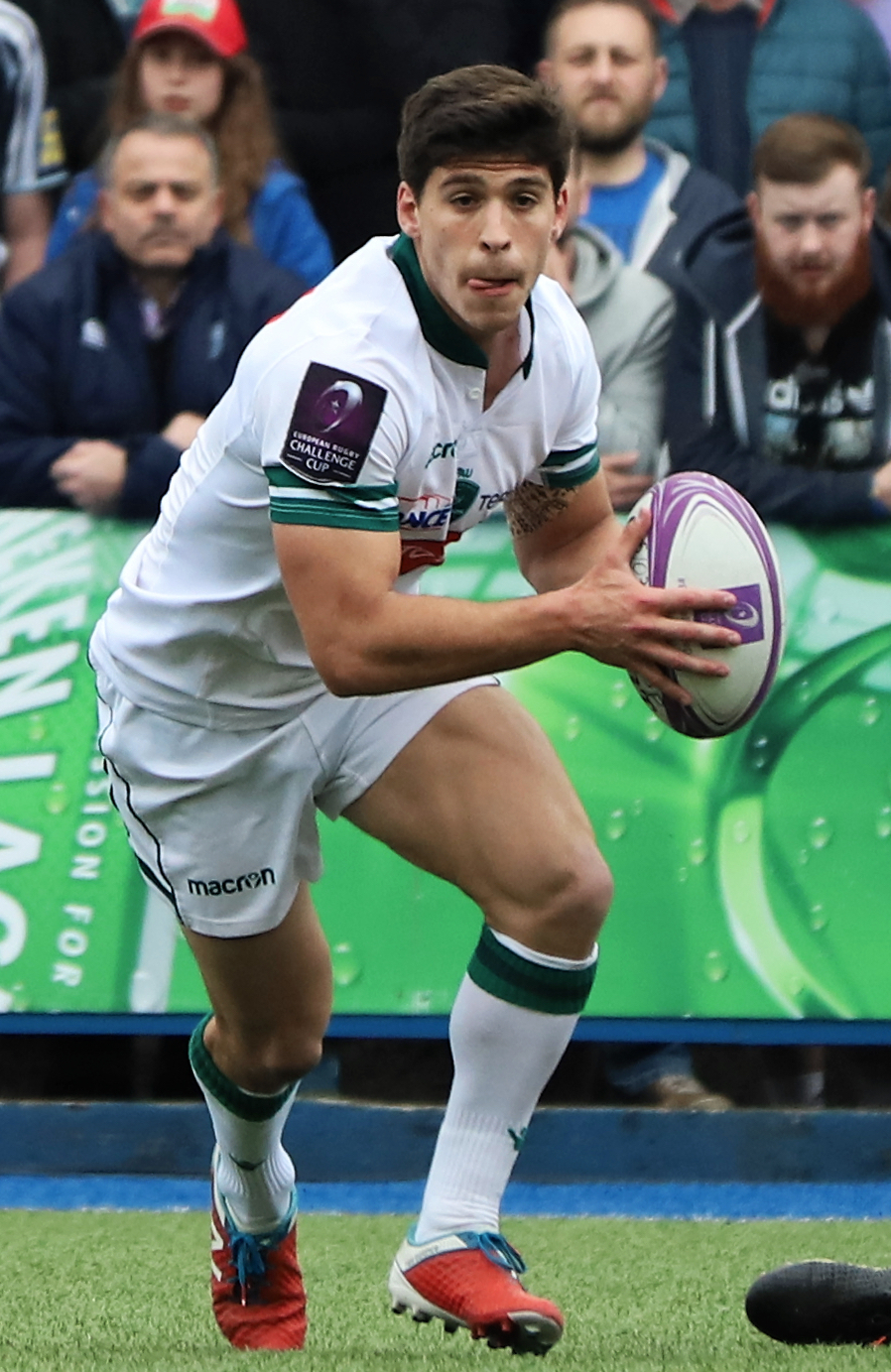
- Daubagna playing for Pau in 2018
- Born: Thibault Daubagna; 20 May 1994 (age 32) France
- Height: 1.77 m (5 ft 9 1/2 in)
- Weight: 83 kg (13 st 1 lb; 183 lb)

Rugby union career
- Position: Scrum-half
- Current team: Pau
Amateur team(s)
Years	Team	Apps	(Points)
1999–2013	Pau		
Senior career
Years	Team	Apps	(Points)
2013–	Pau	295	(393)
- Correct as of 6 October 2019
International career
Years	Team	Apps	(Points)
2018	French Barbarians	1	(5)
2025–	France	2	(0)
- Correct as of 19 July 2025

Thibault Daubagna (born 20 May 1994) is a French rugby union player who plays as a scrum-half for Section Paloise.

== Biography ==
=== Early life and training ===
Daubagna was born on 20 May 1994 in Pau and grew up in Jurançon, a suburb of the Béarn capital. His family has deep ties to the region, and he was introduced to rugby by his parents, particularly his mother, Marie-Hélène Etchebest, who often brought him to Section Paloise matches with his father and grandfather. He is also the nephew of renowned French chef Christian Etchebest.

In his formative years, Daubagna played mini rugby with Section Paloise at the Stade de la Croix du Prince, starting in 1999 at the age of six. Initially a winger, he transitioned to scrum-half during his time in the youth ranks. A product of the club's academy, he progressed through every level.

=== Club career ===
==== Section Paloise (Since 2013) ====
Thibault Daubagna made his senior debut for Section Paloise on 30 August 2013, at the age of 19, under head coach Simon Mannix. This milestone occurred during the 2013–14 Pro D2 season in a match against FC Auch, marking an emotional moment for fans, as a local boy donned the club’s jersey. Daubagna came off the bench in the final ten minutes, fulfilling a childhood dream.

Due to sanctions against Taniela Moa and injuries to Kevin Boulogne, Daubagna quickly established himself in the first team. Over two seasons in Pro D2, he partnered André Hough at fly-back, played 32 matches, and scored four tries. At the end of the 2014–15 Pro D2, he was crowned Pro D2 champion alongside Béarn veterans Jean Bouilhou and Damien Traille, securing Pau's return to the Top 14. He signed his first professional contract on 6 April 2014.

===== Introduction to the Top 14 =====
Daubagna made his Top 14 debut on 28 November 2015 against Union Bordeaux Bègles during the 2015–16 Top 14 season. That season, he played 18 matches and scored 40 points with the boot. In the European Challenge Cup, he took on kicking duties to support All Blacks stars Tom Taylor and Colin Slade.

From the 2016–17 Top 14 season onwards, Daubagna faced competition from former French international Julien Tomas but cemented his place as a regular starter. Despite interest from Montpellier Hérault Rugby, he opted to remain at newly promoted Pau, where Simon Mannix planned to appoint him captain. In November 2016, he extended his contract for three more years.

In the 2017–18 Top 14 season, Daubagna featured in 24 Top 14 matches and six 2017–18 European Rugby Challenge Cup games. He celebrated his 100th appearance for la Section on 28 January 2018 during a resounding 40-5 victory over Stade Français at Stade Jean-Bouin. Mid-season, he was named captain of the team.

During the 2018–19 Top 14 season, Daubagna played 26 Top 14 matches, scoring six tries, and featured in two 2018–19 European Rugby Challenge Cup games. He quickly became a key figure in Pau’s attack and an integral part of the squad’s leadership group.

===== COVID-19 Pandemic and Challenges =====
The 2019–20 Top 14 season, disrupted by the COVID-19 pandemic, limited Daubagna to 15 matches. Initially an undisputed starter, he faced reduced playing time following the second spell of Samuel Marques at Stade du Hameau. Despite this, Daubagna remained a leader within the team and extended his contract until 2022. Changes in the coaching staff, with Nicolas Godignon and Frédéric Manca taking over, brought further challenges to his starting role.

In the 2020–21 Top 14 season, Daubagna played 22 matches in the Top 14, scoring three tries. His performances were crucial in helping Pau avoid relegation.

===== Leadership and Milestones =====
In the 2021–22 Top 14 season, Daubagna featured in 20 matches, scoring one try. In February 2022, he extended his contract by four years, committing to the club until June 2026. On 5 June 2022, he played his 200th match for Section Paloise in a game against Castres Olympique.

The following season, former Wasps scrum-half Dan Robson joined the club, and since then, he and Daubagna have been sharing the scrum-half duties for the 2022–23, 2023–24, and 2024–25 Top 14 seasons.

== Honours ==
France

- 1x Six Nations Championship: 2026
