= MasterChef Chile =

- Logo used in the format
- Genre: Cookery
- Created by: Franc Roddam
- Written by: Hugo Alé
- Directed by: Mirko Morán
- Presented by: Diana Bolocco
- Judges: Yann Yvin (S1-2); Ennio Carota (S1-3); Sergi Arola (S3); Christopher Carpentier (S1-present); Jorge Rausch (S4-present); Fernanda Fuentes (S4-present)
- Country of origin: Chile
- Original language: Spanish
- No. of seasons: 5

Production
- Executive producer: Francisco Callejas
- Producers: Andrés Authier; María José Hernández; Rocío Oporto; Orlando Vergara; María Elena Cruz; Cristian López; Andrés Venegas; Claudio Contreras; Claudia Romero
- Running time: 90 minutes

Original release
- Network: Canal 13
- Release: October 26, 2014

MasterChef Chile is a Chilean television competitive cooking show based on the original British MasterChef. It is presented by Diana Bolocco accompanied by French chef Yann Yvin, Chilean chef Christopher Carpentier, and Italian Chef Ennio Carota as the show's main judges. It is produced and broadcast on Canal 13. The first episode aired on 26 October 2014, and the series one finale was broadcast on 2 February 2015. The first winner was 26-year-old Daniela Castro.

The second season premiered on 18 October 2015 and ended on 28 January 2016. The winner was Alfonso Castro, a 63-year-old waiter. The series have had also a spin-off series Junior Masterchef which featured only younger contestants and premiered on Sunday 20 March 2016. The third and last season was premiered on 5 March 2017, with Spanish chef Sergi Arola joining in as the new judge, in place of Frenchman Yann Yvin.

== Judges ==
=== At present ===
Judge	Profession
Christopher Carpentier	He is one of the most successful and renowned chefs in Chile. He has been awarded several times, being named the 2010 Chef of the Bicentennial of Chile.
Fernanda Fuentes	Based on Spain, she owns the NUB restaurant, winner of 1 Michelín Star, in 2017, being the first Chilean chef awarded with this distinction.
Jorge Rausch	He is a renowned Colombian chef with Polish roots, owner of the Criterión restaurant. He is also main chef, owner and partner of Bistronomy by Rausch, Rausch Energía Gastronómica, Marea by Rausch, El Gobernador by Rausch, Kitchen by Rausch', Local by Rausch and Ivory Bistró by Rausch, the latter of them in Costa Rica.

=== Previous ===
Judge	Seasons	Profession
Yann Yvin	1, 2	With 30 years of experience in the most demanding kitchens in the world, he has the word excellence as a key concept in the success of his work. He came to work in the most prestigious kitchens in his country, such as those of the French Ministry of Defense and for the President of the French Republic, Monsieur François Mitterrand. He has opened more than 13 restaurants in both Chile and France. In addition, he has dedicated himself to high-level banqueting, organizing summits of presidents, advising embassies for royal visits or birthdays of internationally renowned celebrities such as Pelé.
Ennio Carota	1, 2, 3	Carota is one of the most beloved and renowned exponents of the cuisine of his country. Tireless globetrotter, after studying at the Scuola Alberghiera in Turin, he went to travel the world knowing and working in the most diverse cuisines of Asia, Australia, the Caribbean, North America, Latin America and Europe, discovering, among other things, the Nouvelle. Cuisine, which made him discover new paths on his gastronomic journey.
Sergi Arola	3	He is a Spanish chef who was responsible for La Broche restaurant, located in the Hotel Miguel Ángel, Madrid. He is also currently working in the kitchen of Hotel Arts, in Barcelona, and has opened his own restaurant in Madrid, Gastro, where he can give free rein to his creativity in the kitchen and where you can also visit its cocktail space.

== Amateur Seasons ==
=== Season 1 (2014-2015) ===
Contestant	Age	Occupation	Final position
Daniela Castro	26	Visual Artist	Winner; Saved 7th Eviction
Ignacio Riveros	26	Garbage Collector	Runner-Up
Leonora Saavedra	50	Merchant	Finalist
Alejandra Orellana	31	Law Student	Semifinalist; 9th Evicted
Eliana Hernández	85	Housewife	22nd Evicted
Paula Avilés	45	Alternative Therapist	21st Evicted
Rodrigo Lemus	39	History Teacher	20th Evicted; Abandons
Francisco González	28	Actor	19th Evicted
Robert Pinter	24	Actor and DJ	18th Evicted; 8th Evicted
Óscar Barrera	22	Medicine Student	17th Evicted
Karla González	25	Paramedic	16th Evicted; 13th Evicted
Marco Olea	35	Former footballer	15th Evicted
Ángela Argandoña	54	Housewife	14th Evicted
Sandra Lagos	39	Housemaid	12th Evicted
Annelore Baumann	53	Businesswoman	11th Evicted
Claudia Westphal	31	Social Worker	10th Evicted
Paulina Ahumada	49	Housewife	6th Evicted
Raquel Muñoz	41	Housewife	5th Evicted
Kimberly Salazar	17	Student	4th Evicted
Pablo Edwards	59	Architect	3rd Evicted
Jean Meneses	27	Electronics Technician	2nd Evicted
Nicolás Achondo	32	Graphic Designer	1st Evicted

=== Season 2 (2015-16) ===
Contestant	Age	Occupation	Status
Alfonso Castro	63	Waiter	Winner
Maximiliano Cabezón	25	Civil Industrial Engineer	Runner-Up
M.ª Elena Almendra Santibáñez	48	Art Dealer	Finalists
Maylín González	28	Ex-convict Cook	Finalists
Felipe Taverne	39	Architect	Semifinalist
Alejandra González	28	Policewoman	23rd Evicted
Camila Sepúlveda	19	Nutrition Student	22nd Evicted; 13th Evicted
Renato del Valle	35	Photographer	21st Evicted
Pachara Poonsawat	27	Translator and Singer	20th Evicted; 4th Evicted
Fabián Calvumil	18	Amateur Boxer	19th Evicted
Karin Huber	28	Waitress	18th Evicted
Eduardo Leche Améstica	36	Artist and Musician	17th Evicted
María José Muñoz	34	Artist and Housewife	16th Evicted; 11th Evicted
Odette Handschun	34	Lunch Seller	15th Evicted; 2nd Evicted
Macarena Urrutia	28	Nutritionist	14th Evicted
Francisca Márquez	24	Social Work Student	12th Evicted
Nancy Jarpa	47	Waitress	10th Evicted
Andrés Bravo	32	Architect	9th Evicted
Jorge Valentino Sánchez	48	Crooner	8th Evicted
Fabricio Aedo	30	Fisherman	7th Evicted
Gabriel González	26	Technical Nursing Assistant	6th Evicted
Sheila González	35	DJ, publicist and actress	5th Evicted
Joaquín Fuentes	24	Firefighter	3rd Evicted
Ss. Mónica Araya	55	Special Education Nun	1st Evicted

=== Season 3 (2017) ===
Contestant	Age	Occupation	Status
Faryd García	21	Parking Meter Operator	Winner
Yuhui Lee	27	Perfume Retailer	Runner-Up
Andrés Bundy Cid	41	Professional Wrestler	Finalists
Valentina Ramos	27	Lunch Seller	Finalists
Rosa Ortiz	30	Baker	Semifinalists
Sandra Inostroza	29	Singer	Semifinalists
Jorge Fernández	61	Safety Services' Entrepreneur	23rd Evicted
Yerko Flores	38	Military	22nd Evicted
Caio de la Vega	32	Model and Advertising Agent	21st Evicted
Pola Jakasovic	42	Leather Purses' Designer	20th Evicted
Alain Veyser	71	Ex-merchant ship Captain	19th Evicted
Hernán Norambuena	45	Plastic Surgeon	18th Evicted; 11th Evicted
Josefa Barraza	22	Journalism Student and Model	17th Evicted
Myriam Ugalde	61	Housewife	16th Evicted; 14th Evicted
Felipe Coya	34	Sushi Shop Owner	15th Evicted; 7th Evicted
Paula Hermosilla	22	Special Education Teacher	Abandons; 10th Evicted
Daniel Iron-Man Lay	30	Street Artist	13th Evicted
Alfredo Edith Barriga	26	Law Student	12th Evicted
Cristián "Pistola" Flores	45	Former Footballer	10th Evicted
Pamela Jeria	37	Model and Health Visitor Student	9th Evicted
Andrea Cortés	55	Maintenance Worker	8th Evicted
Isabel Yáñez	34	Housewife	6th Evicted
Tatiana Reyes	53	Psychologist	5th Evicted
Valentina Urbina	16	Student	4th Evicted
Patricia Ortiz	37	Housewife	3rd Evicted
Manuel Vergara	43	Industrial Engineer and YouTuber	2nd Evicted
Víctor Rubilar	27	Agricultural Technician	1st Evicted

=== Season 4 (2019) ===
Contestant	Age	Occupation	Status
Camila Ruiz	28	Language Teacher	Winner
Bárbara Lackington	19	Model	Runner-Ups
Giovanni Cárdenas	28	Pizza Seller	Runner-Ups
Jeffry Bastías	28	Teacher	Semifinalist
Katarzyna Kaschka Glazewska	54	Housewife	17th Evicted
Aníbal Valdés	20	Medical Student	16th Evicted
José Miguel González	29	Veterinary	15th Evicted
Karen Saavedra	33	Nutritionist	14th Evicted
Lautaro Soto	28	Sommelier	13th Evicted
Fidelina Leal	44	Referee	12th Evicted
Diana Morales	35	Housewife	11th Evicted
Javier Lizama	30	Engineer	10th Evicted
Ignacio Giannini	54	Entrepreneur	9th Evicted
Annabella Cardone	61	Philosophy Teacher	8th Evicted
Maximiliano Alonso	25	Influencer	7th Evicted
Fernanda Muñoz	24	Model	6th Evicted
Antonia Figueroa	23	Engineering Student and Model	5th Evicted
Fernando Vallejos	31	Municipal Employee	4th Evicted
Alejandro Alfaro	26	Sushi Bar Assistant	3rd Evicted
Mónica Carvacho	45	Saleswoman	2nd Evicted
Claudia Poblete	49	Designer	1st Evicted

== Junior Edition (2016) ==
Contestant	Age	Status
Emilia Muñoz	12	Winner
Clemente Rodríguez	12	Runner-Up
Francisco Velásquez	10	Finalists
Simón Acuña	9	Finalists
Cristóbal Velásquez	10	Semifinalists
Javiera Romero	12	Semifinalists
Mailén Flores	13	Semifinalists
Sebastián Sarralde	10	Semifinalists
Valentina Maldonado	9	7th Evicteds (Week 11)
Vicente González	10	7th Evicteds (Week 11)
Agustina Espinoza	9	6th Evicteds (Week 9)
Verónica García	10	6th Evicteds (Week 9)
Dominga Matte	11	5th Evicteds (Week 8)
Trinidad Fernández	10	5th Evicteds (Week 8)
Valentina Kock	12	5th Evicteds (Week 8)
Diego Nagel	12	4th Evicteds (Week 7)
Maián Farre	11	4th Evicteds (Week 7)
Dominga Doberti	12	3rd Evicteds (Week 5)
Franco Poblete	11	3rd Evicteds (Week 5)
Maximiliano Lira	12	3rd Evicteds (Week 5)
Camelia Rojas	11	2nd Evicteds (Week 4)
Macarena Ramos	11	2nd Evicteds (Week 4)
Pablo Abarca	9	2nd Evicteds (Week 4)
Benjamín Thiebaut	13	1st Evicteds (Week 3)
Clemente Montabone	10	1st Evicteds (Week 3)
Maximiliano Torres	9	1st Evicteds (Week 3)

== Celebrity Seasons ==
=== 1st season (2020) ===
Contestant	Age	Occupation	Status
Natalia Duco	31	Olympic Shot Put Medalist	Winner
César Campos	38	Journalist	Runner-Ups
Rocío Marengo	40	TV personality	Runner-Ups
Marcelo Marrocchino	21	Fashion Designer and Model	13th Evicted
Betsy Camino	23	Dancer, Model, 2018 Viña del Mar Queen	12th Evicted
Álvaro Nacho Pop Reyes	37	Journalist	11th Evicted
Stephanie Botota Fox	39	Transformist and Comedian	10th Evicted
Ignacia Allamand	39	Actress and Playwright	9th Evicted
Carlos Zárate	60	Journalist	8th Evicted
Daniela Palavecino	36	Actress	7th Evicted
Grimanesa Jiménez	83	Actress	6th Evicted
Adriano Castillo	79	Actor and Politician	5th Evicted
Pablito Ruiz	45	Singer	4th Evicted
Stephanie Steffi Méndez	25	Influencer	3rd Evicted
Rantes Ranty Verdugo	27	Instagrammer	Abandons
Waldo Patricio Pato Torres	67	Actor and Comedian	2nd Evicted
Leo Caprile	61	TV host	Abandons
Ledy Soa Ledy Ossandón	58	Pasapalabra ex-contestant	1st Evicted

=== 2nd season (2021) ===
Contestant	Age	Occupation	Status
Begoña Basauri	39	Actress, Radio Broadcaster and TV Host	Winner
María Jesús Tutú Vidaurre	25	Model and Actress	Runner-Ups
Pollo Castillo	27	Influencer	Runner-Ups
Gastón Bernardou	54	Los Autenticos Decadentes Percussionist	Semifinalist
Felipe Ríos	46	Actor and Theater Director	13rd Evicted
Rodrigo Avilés, Gallina	29	Influencer	12th Evicted
Josefina Pepi Velasco	59	Actress	11th Evicted
Nataly Chilet	35	Journalist and Miss Chile 2008	10th Evicted
Yamila Reyna	42	Comedian and Actress	Abandons
Rodrigo Herrera	46	Sportscaster and Journalist	9th Evicted
Claudia Miranda	53	Dancer and Choreographer	8th Evicted
Camila Recabarren	30	Miss Chile 2012	7th Evicted
Álvaro López	41	Los Bunkers Vocalist	6th Evicted
Julio Milostich	54	Actor	5th Evicted
Flor de Rap	32	Singer-songwriter	4th Evicted
Cristina Tocco	62	Former Vedette and Actress	3rd Evicted
Nelson Ávila	78	Former Senator	2nd Evicted
Fréderic Redondo	46	Image Advisor and Socialite	1st Evicted
