= Lesego Semenya =

South African chef, media personality, and writer (1982–2021)

- Born: 11 April 1982; Soweto, Transvaal, South Africa
- Died: 12 July 2021 (aged 39); Soweto, Gauteng, South Africa
- Education: Prue Leith Culinary Institute; University of the Witwatersrand
- Culinary career
- Television shows: Top Chef South Africa; Celebrity Mystery Box
- Website: www.lesdachef.com

Lesego Semenya (11 April 1982 – 12 July 2021), also known as Les Da Chef, was a South African chef, media personality, and writer.

== Early life and education ==
Semenya was born and raised in Soweto. His parents were teachers, his mother a principal and his father a maths and science teacher, and he had two younger brothers. He attended Greenside High School and went on to graduate with a Bachelor of Commerce from the University of the Witwatersrand.

Semenya began his career as a process engineer for the IQ Business Group and a journalist for the youth magazine UnCut. In 2008, he decided to change careers after receiving a mild clinical depression diagnosis. He took a gap year to travel the country before enrolling at the Prue Leith Culinary Institute in Centurion, earning the Grande Diploma in Food and Wine in addition to five other qualifications. In 2020, he received the alumni award for Inspiring Culinary Excellence from Leith.

== Career ==
Semenya worked at The Westcliff at the Four Seasons, Johannesburg under Nicky Gibbs.

For the 2010 FIFA World Cup in South Africa, Semenya entered and won a pie-making competition organised by the British High Commission, Pretoria. His pie, based on the kota dish from his township, became the official pie for British football fans visiting the country to watch the games. As part of his prize, he got to work at Corrigan's in Mayfair, London.

He then entered the private catering world, working for the likes of Howard Buffett, Alicia Keys, Bill Gates, on the Sabi Sand Game Reserve, and for Liverpool FC.

In 2014, Semenya returned to his hometown to launch his business LesDaChef Culinary Solutions. After his experiences in fine dining, he made it his mission to make food accessible and celebrate the local, diverse cuisine of South Africa. He made weekly radio appearances on Power FM to discuss food. He ran a food blog, notable for being based in Johannesburg rather than Cape Town, and used social media to share recipes. He gave talks at universities and culinary schools, and consulted businesses.

Semenya appeared on the Mail & Guardian's 2015 list of Top 200 Young South Africans. He was a judge on the 2016 season of Top Chef South Africa, with Neill Anthony as a fellow judge and Lorna Maseko as the presenter.

In 2018, Semenya signed a book deal with Jacana Media and published his cookbook Dijo: My Food, My Journey, which became a bestseller. In June 2021, he gained full rights to the book and intended to self-publish from then on. He had plans to release a second book.

In 2019, Semenya began posting videos, most of which were cooking tutorials, on his YouTube channel, which he called Dipitseng.

Semenya and Chef Nti Ramaboa hosted the celebrity cooking competition Celebrity Mystery Box, which aired on Mzansi Magic in summer 2020. Celebrity participants included Moozlie, Moshe Ndiki, Khanyisa Bunu, Zolisa Xaluva, Enhle Mbali Mlotshwa, and Jo-anne Reyneke.

== Personal life ==
Semenya lived in Meredale with his partner Sisipho Gcanga.

== Death ==
Semenya took a COVID-19 test on 5 July 2021 and received a positive result the next day. He had been diagnosed with Type 1 diabetes in April 2018. He posted a video in August 2020 about how he was staying healthy and safe. He was awaiting vaccination and while in care, criticised the medical costs, feeling the government had let "non-old" people with comorbidities down. On 12 July, his manager Miz Marcee announced Semenya had died of complications related to the illness at age 39 after a short battle. News24 reported that he had died on 12 July 2021. His funeral was held on 16 July.

Tributes were paid online, in publications, and in person.

== Bibliography ==
- Dijo: My Food, My Journey (2018)
