= Les Ambassadeurs (restaurant) =

Coordinates: 48°52′02″N 2°19′18″E

- Interactive map of Les Ambassadeurs

Restaurant information
- Closed: 2013
- Location: Paris, France

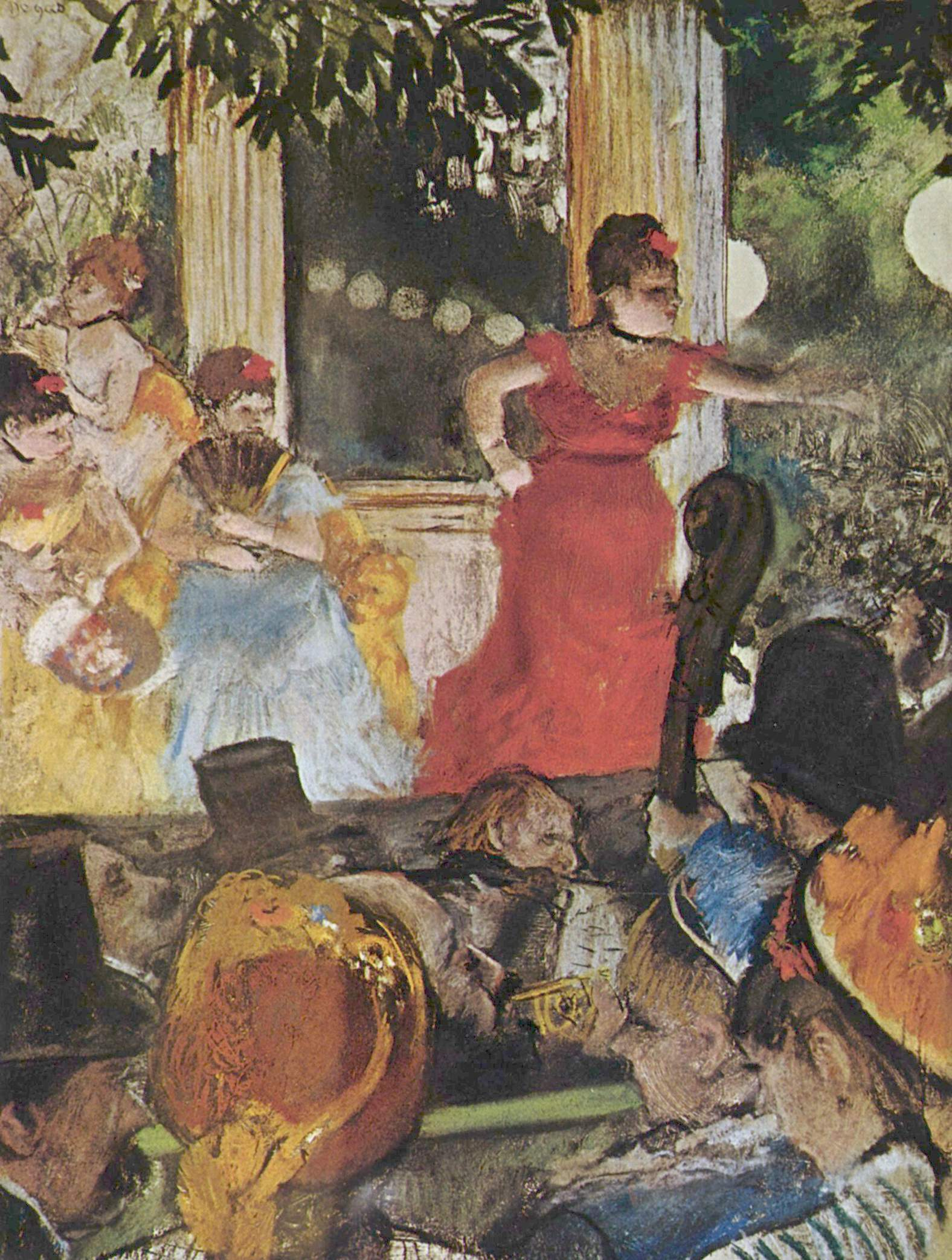
Le café-concert des Ambassadeurs. Edgar Degas, 1876–77. The singer is probably Victorine Demay.

Les Ambassadeurs was a restaurant in Paris, France, situated in the Hôtel de Crillon. It closed on March 31, 2013, when the hotel closed for renovations, and in 2017 the space reopened as a bar, with Les Ambassadeurs being replaced by a smaller restaurant.

== History ==
Within the Hôtel de Crillon, which was built in 1758, Les Ambassadeurs operated as a restaurant since the mid-19th century. It reached its peak of fame as a restaurant and nightclub (a café-concert known as the Café des Ambassadeurs) in the last three decades of the 19th century. Always a center of entertainment for the aristocracy, in the 1870s it also became a regular destination of some of the best known figures of art and the demi-monde. Edgar Degas and Henri de Toulouse-Lautrec portrayed visitors at the night club, and artists like Eugénie Fougère and Aristide Bruant performed there.

Following a renovation of the hotel in 1981–85, the restaurant occupied a former private ballroom with windows looking out on the Place de la Concorde, a few hundred meters from the Palais Garnier. It was decorated in an 18th-century rococo style, redesigned by Sybille de Margérie with furnishings by Sonia Rykiel.

Les Ambassadeurs had two Michelin stars. In the last decade of its operation, chef was Dominique Bouchet followed by Jean-François Piège and finally when the hotel closed in 2013 for an extended renovation, Christopher Hache.

In 2017 Hache opened a smaller restaurant, L'Écrin, within the renovated hotel; the former space of Les Ambassadeurs became a bar.
