= Johan Jureskog =

Swedish chef

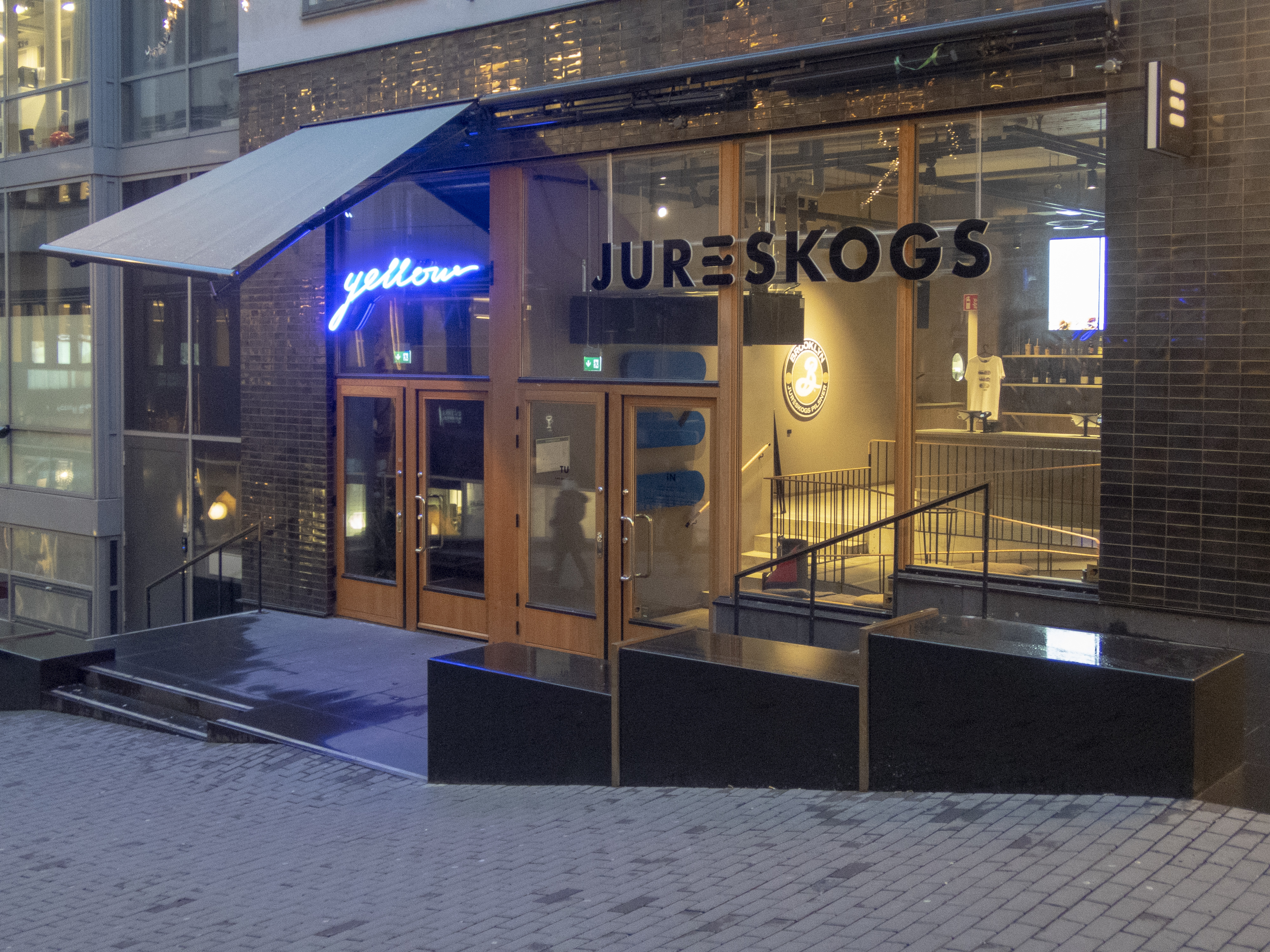
Jureskogs restaurant at Jakobsbergsgatan in Stockholm

Bengt Johan Jureskog (born 5 July 1975) is a Swedish chef. He started his career by working at the restaurant Rolfs kök in Stockholm, and later became part-owner of the same restaurant. Jureskog owns the restaurant AG, which specializes in meat dishes.

In 2018, Jureskog along with his brother started the hamburger bar Jureskogs, with hamburgers inspired by Johan Jureskog's travels during filming of Världens bästa burgare. For eight years he was a member of the Swedish cooking national team and with Cooking olympics in 2004. From 2009 through 2010, he was the chef creating several dishes during the show Förkväll which was broadcast on TV4, and also appeared in Nyhetsmorgon. In 2013, he participated as a contestant in Kockarnas kamp on TV4, in which he competed against other professional chefs for the title of chef of the year.

In 2015 and 2016, Jureskog took part in two seasons of the hamburger show Världens bästa burgare (The world's best burger) which was broadcast on TV3. In season 1, he along with Malin Gramer, travelled through the US and tried hamburgers in several cities, in season two Frida Nordstrand joined him replacing Gramer. In the first season's last episode Jureskog competed in the WFC Burger competition in Kissimmee, Florida, USA.
