= Glenn Viel =

French chef

- Born: 2 January 1980 (age 45); Versailles
- Occupation: Chef
- Television: Top Chef (season 13)
- Awards: 3 Michelin stars

Glenn Viel is a French chef. He was awarded 3 Michelin stars at the restaurant l'Oustau de Baumanière..

== Restaurants ==
Glenn Viel is the chef of L'Oustau de Baumanière in Les Baux-de-Provence since March 2015. He was awarded 3 Michelin stars in 2020 at age 39, and became the youngest French chef to receive 3 stars

== Appearance and activities ==
Viel appears in the documentary A Chef's Voyage (2020).

Viel is a jury member since the season 13 of Top Chef France.
