= Frida Nordstrand =

Swedish journalist and sports commentator

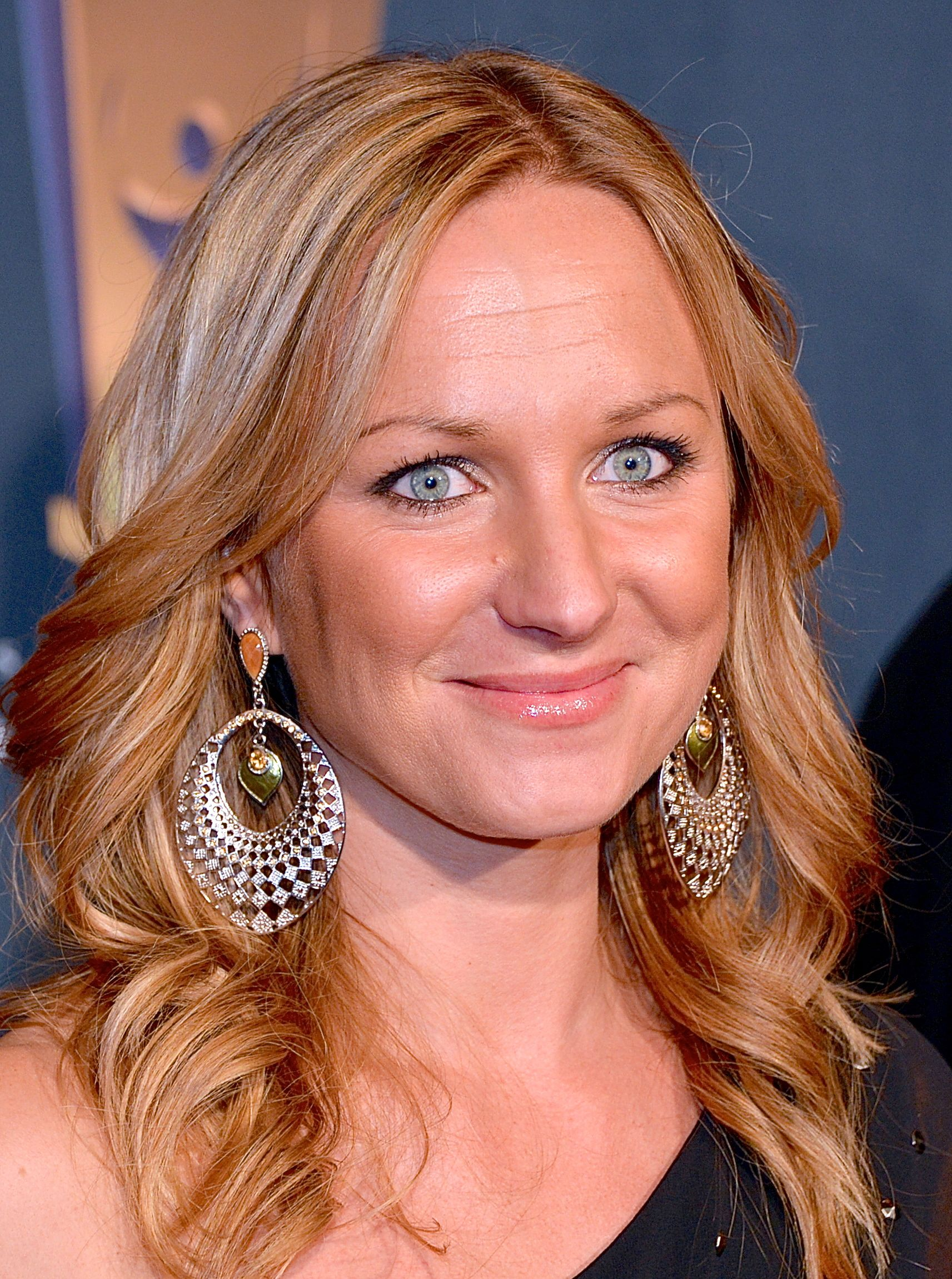
- Frida Nordstrand (2013)
- Born: 23 October 1980 (age 45); Sandviken, Sweden
- Occupations: Sports commentator, Journalist

Karin Frida Teresia Nordstrand (born 23 October 1980) is a Swedish journalist and sports commentator at TV4.

Nordstrand grew up in Sandviken where she lived until she was ten years old. Her family then moved to Spain and resided there for a few years and also spent some time living in the UK until returning to Sweden again. Nordstrand is an educated actress at Spegelteatern in Stockholm and worked there at the same time as she educated herself as a physio-trainer. This later led her into the television work as she started to give personal training advice for the Kanal Lokal in Stockholm. After a while she was recruited by Viasat Sport where she started to cover Champions League and the Formula 1 series. She covered several sports at the 2014 Winter Olympics for Viasat Sport and TV3.

In 2011 and 2013, she was nominated for "Sports television profile of the year" at the television gala Kristallen. Frida Nordstrand is in a relationship with footballer Jan-Erik Berg playing for IF Brommapojkarna.
