= Ghislaine Arabian =

French chef

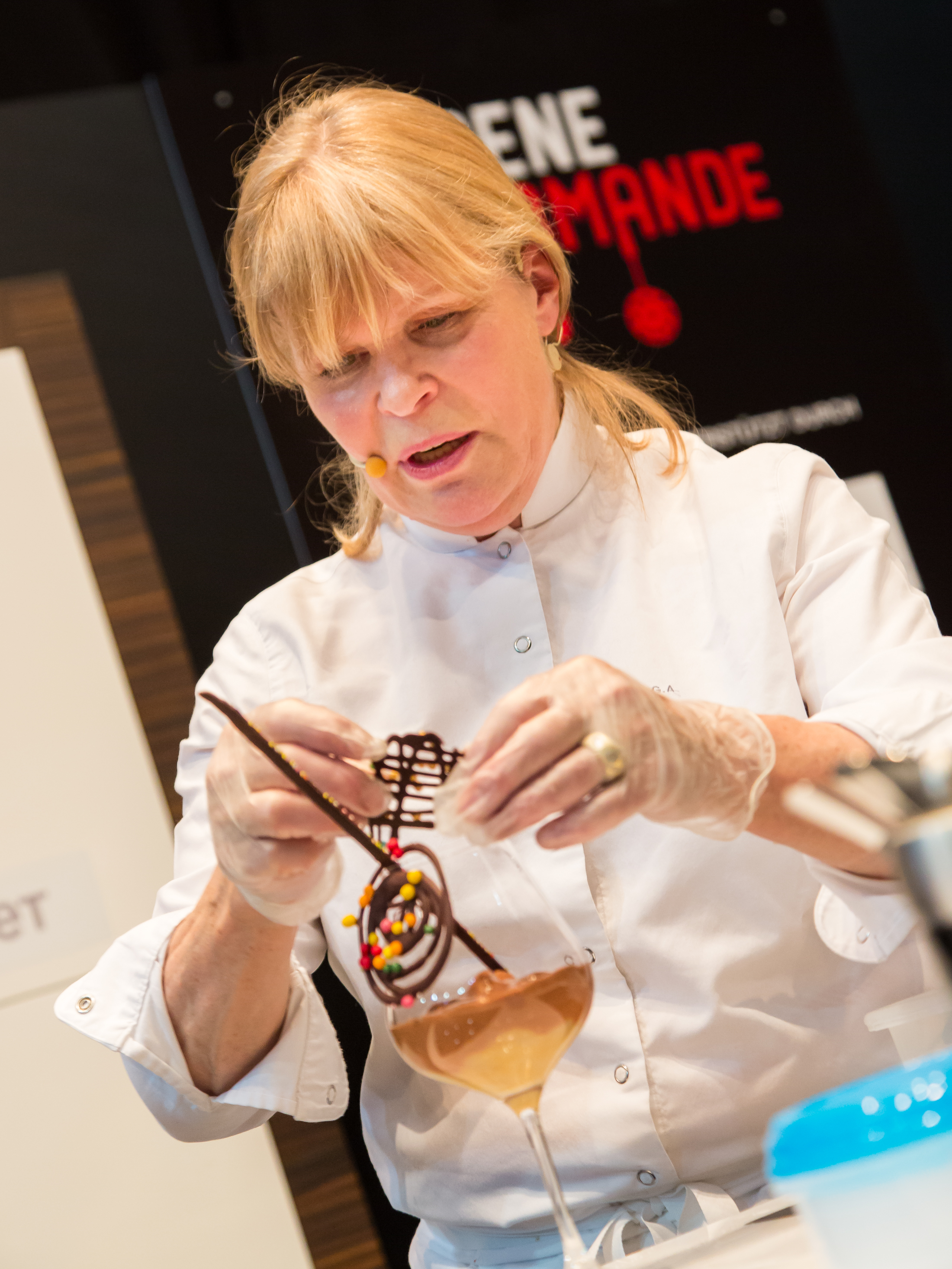
- Ghislaine Arabian au Salon Suisse des Goûts et Terroirs en 2014.jpg
- Born: August 1948 (age 76); Croix, Nord, France
- Culinary career
- Rating(s): Michelin stars
- Current restaurant(s): Les Petites Sorcières (Paris)
- Previous restaurant(s): Ledoyen (Paris)
- Television show(s): Top Chef (France)

Ghislaine Arabian (French pronunciation: [ɡilɛn aʁabjɑ̃], born August 1948) is a French chef. She received two stars from the Guide Michelin.

== Early life ==
Ghislaine Arabian was born and raised in Croix in the department of Nord near Roubaix.

== Career ==
She is a chef specializing in French and Flemish cuisine. From 1992 to 1998, she was chef at the Pavillon Ledoyen, the only woman at the time to have received two Michelin stars. In 2007, she became the owner of the restaurant Les Petites Sorcières in Paris.

== Television ==
From 2010 to 2014, she has been a member of the jury in the French version of the cooking contest Top Chef.
