= Top Chef (Romanian TV series) =

- Also known as: Top Chef România
- Genre: Reality; Cooking
- Presented by: Alina Pușcaș
- Starring: Joseph Hadad; Tudor Constantinescu; Nicolai Tand
- Country of origin: Romania
- Original language: Romanian
- No. of seasons: 2
- No. of episodes: 24

Production
- Running time: 120 minutes

Original release
- Network: Antena 1
- Release: 5 November 2012 – 20 January 2014

Top Chef, also known as Top Chef România, is a Romanian reality competition show on the cable television network Antena 1, first aired in 2012, in which chefs compete against each other in culinary challenges. They are judged by a panel of professional chefs and other notables from the food and wine industry with one or more contestants eliminated in each episode. The show is hosted by Alina Pușcaș. The judges are Joseph Hadad, Tudor Constantinescu and Nicolai Tand.

== Show format ==
Generally, each episode of Top Chef, other than the finale has had two challenges.

The first is called the Quickfire challenge. Each chef must cook a dish that meets certain requirements (for example, using specific ingredients or to inspire a certain taste) or participate in a culinary-related challenge (for example, a mise en place relay or a taste test). They are usually given an hour or less to complete these tasks. A guest judge selects one or more chefs as the best in the challenge. Early in the season the winning chef(s) are granted immunity from the episode's Elimination Challenge. As the number of contestants dwindle immunity is withdrawn, and instead the winner receives an advantage (such as being team leader for a team challenge) or a prize. To emphasise the culture and environment of the sixth season's Las Vegas setting, the show introduced "high-stakes" Quickfires, which featured an extravagant prize (usually a large cash prize). High-stakes Quickfires would continue onward in further seasons. Occasionally, a Quickfire will also include the poorest performer being eliminated from the competition. Sometimes contestants have been dismissed for violations such as tasting a sauce with a finger.

In the Elimination challenge, the chefs prepare one or more dishes to meet the challenge requirements, which are usually more complex and require longer time to execute than a Quickfire challenge. Elimination challenges may be individual challenges or may require chefs to work in a team, and may require a chef or chefs to produce several courses. Teams may be selected by the remaining contestants among themselves, but more often are selected by the random process such as by "drawing knives" from a butcher's block, with the team identification revealed on the blade of the knife. The chefs may have from a few hours to a few days to complete this challenge, which typically includes preparation and planning time. Ingredients for Elimination challenges generally allow chefs to access both what staples are available in the "Top Chef" pantry and what they chefs purchase at a grocery store, within a specified budget. However, certain challenges may provide specific ingredients or limit the type or number of ingredients that can be used, while others require non-traditional methods of obtaining ingredients (such as asking people door-to-door) or preparation methods (such as tailgate cooking). After shopping, the contestants will cook for up to four judges, usually including at least one guest judge. In most cases, the contestants cook for a group of guests (for example, the cowboys in Colorado) as well.

After the Elimination Challenge ends, the chefs report to Judges' Table, where the four judges will consider the guests' comments if available and deliberate on their choices for the best and worst dishes. The top individuals or teams are called in, and may be asked questions about their dishes or preparation before they are notified of their placement. One or more chefs is named the winner of the challenge and may be awarded an additional prize by the guest judge. The same procedure is repeated with the poorest performing chefs or team, after which similar discussion takes place. From this group, one chef is chosen for elimination, with the host asking the chef to "pack [their] knives and go." This is usually followed by a knife packing sequence for the eliminated chef, and with a voice over of their final thoughts about their performance, at the close of the episode. According to the credits, some elimination decisions are made in consultation with the show's producers.

The prize money awarded to the Top Chef was 50,000 Euros for the first season.

== Seasons ==
Season	Premiere Date	Finale Date	No. of Finalists	No. of Episodes	Winner	Runner-up	Judges
1	5 November 2012	12 February 2013	24	12	Giovanni Piselli	Nico Lontras	Joseph Hadad; Tudor Constantinescu; Nicolai Tand
2	21 October 2013	20 January 2014	12	12	Alexandru Iacob	Mihai Irimia	Joseph Hadad; Tudor Constantinescu; Nicolai Tand

On 12 February 2013, Giovanni Piselli was declared the first Top Chef. Piselli defeated Nico Lontras in the grand final. Piselli received a cheque of 50,000 euros.

== Ratings ==
Season premiere	# of Viewers	Release date	Season final	# of Viewers	Release date
Season 1 premiere	1.0 Million	5 November 2012	Season 1 final	1.8 Million	12 February 2013
