= Stéphane Tréand =

French pastry chef

Stéphane Tréand is a French pastry chef from Brignoles, France, Meilleur Ouvrier de France recipient, pastry instructor, and restaurateur residing in California, USA.

== Career ==
Tréand's career began in a bakery in Northern France when he was sixteen years old. While apprenticing at the local shop, he attended pastry courses one week per month in Vincennes, Paris. He worked in several bakeries and shops in Paris, opened his own shop in 1989. The Pâtisserie Tréand, his shop, was located in Brignoles in Provence, South of France. In 1994, while running his shop, he became a Pastry Teacher at the CFA of St. Maximin. He continued to mentor apprentices at the ENSP, a national pastry school in Yssingeaux, France. He sold his shop in 2001 to devote more time to teaching and winning the Meilleur Ouvrier de France, the highest honor given by the President of France to craftsmen. In 2004, he gained the title.

While doing a demonstration as a guest in Las Vegas in 2004, The Four Season's offered him a position as their pastry chef. In 2005, he accepted and assumed the role in Resort in Newport Beach, California. The St. Regis Monarch Beach Resort in Dana Point, CA became his next destination as he held the title of Executive Pastry Chef there. In 2012, Tréand resigned from the position and went on to found The Pastry School in San Clemente. He is one of four MOFs residing in the United States.

Tréand founded the ST Patisserie restaurant in 2014, and ST Chocolat in 2015. Tréand founded The Pastry School in 2012 in San Clemente, California. He relocated the school in 2015 to Costa Mesa, California. He is currently the Executive Chef Consultant for Occitanial in Tokyo, Japan.

== Collaborations ==
Tréand has been a guest chef at the following institutions:

- The Big Island Chocolate Festival, Kona, Big Island, Hawai'i
- The Apron School, Niigata, Japan
- The French Pastry School, Chicago, Illinois
- The Notter School, Orlando, Florida
- The Institute of Culinary Education, New York, New York

He has teamed up with the Chicago School of Mold Making to create a line of professional silicone mats for sugar and chocolate work.

- Coach for the USA Team at the International Pastry Competition in Tokyo, Japan in 2009 (Bronze Medal)

== Awards and recognition ==
- Meilleur Ouvrier de France, 2004
- Winner, Food Network’s “Sugar Daredevils Challenge”, 2005, Phoenix, Arizona
- Gold medal, the National Pastry Team Championship (NPTC), 2007, Nashville, Tennessee
- Winner, World Pastry Champion at the WPTC, 2008, Nashville, Tennessee
- Top Ten Best Pastry Chefs in the US, Pastry Art and Design Magazine, 2007 and 2008
