= Fernanda Fuentes =

Chilean chef (born 1983)

Fernanda Fuentes Cárdenas
- Born: June 15, 1983 (age 42); Quilpué, Chile
- Education: INACAP
- Occupation: Chef

Fernanda Fuentes Cárdenas (born June 15, 1983) is a Chilean chef, best known for being the first Chilean woman to receive a Michelin star.

== Biography ==
=== Youth and education ===
Fernanda Fuentes Cárdenas was born on June 15, 1983 in Quilpué, Chile.

Fuentes developed an early interest in food, leading her to pursue formal training at the University of Technology of Chile, INACAP, where she graduated in 2007 with a degree in Gastronomic Production. Her journey in the culinary arts began with a mix of self-taught skills and formal education, which she enhanced through internships in Spain, including one at the Hotel Golf Peralada.

=== Career ===
==== Opening of her first restaurant ====
Fuentes's career took a significant turn when she moved to Tenerife, Spain, in 2011, where she met Andrea Bernardi, an Italian chef who would later become her husband and business partner. Together, they founded the restaurant Nub in Tenerife in 2014. The restaurant quickly gained recognition for its unique fusion of Chilean, Italian, and Canarian cuisines, a blend that reflects both Fuentes's and Bernardi's culinary backgrounds.

==== Michelin star ====
In 2017, Nub was awarded a Michelin star, making Fuentes the first Chilean woman to earn the distinction. The restaurant has since relocated within Tenerife, currently operating in the luxurious Bahía del Duque hotel in Costa Adeje. Nub’s menu is known for its innovative approach, with an emphasis on respecting produce and authenticity in the kitchen. In a 2017 interview, she described her philosophy as “oficio y amor al arte” (craftsmanship and love for the art) and expressed admiration for Mapuche Chilean chef Anita Epulef.

==== Television ====
Apart from her restaurant endeavors, Fuentes has made her mark on television, serving as a judge on Chilean editions of "MasterChef" and "Masterchef Celebrity Chile." In 2024, she's part of Top Chef VIP Chile. She has used her platform to inspire other women in the culinary field, often speaking about the challenges she faced as a woman in a male-dominated industry.

==== Novatore Cucina & Bar ====
In 2024, Fuentes and Bernardi, along with Marcelo Marocchino and Gabriel Mendelzon, opened Novatore Cucina & Bar in Miami, Florida. It specializes in modern Italian cuisine.

== Activism ==
Fuentes is also involved in charitable activities, such as the "Comida para Todos" initiative, which distributes meals to those in need.
