= Lorna Maseko =

South African chef and dancer

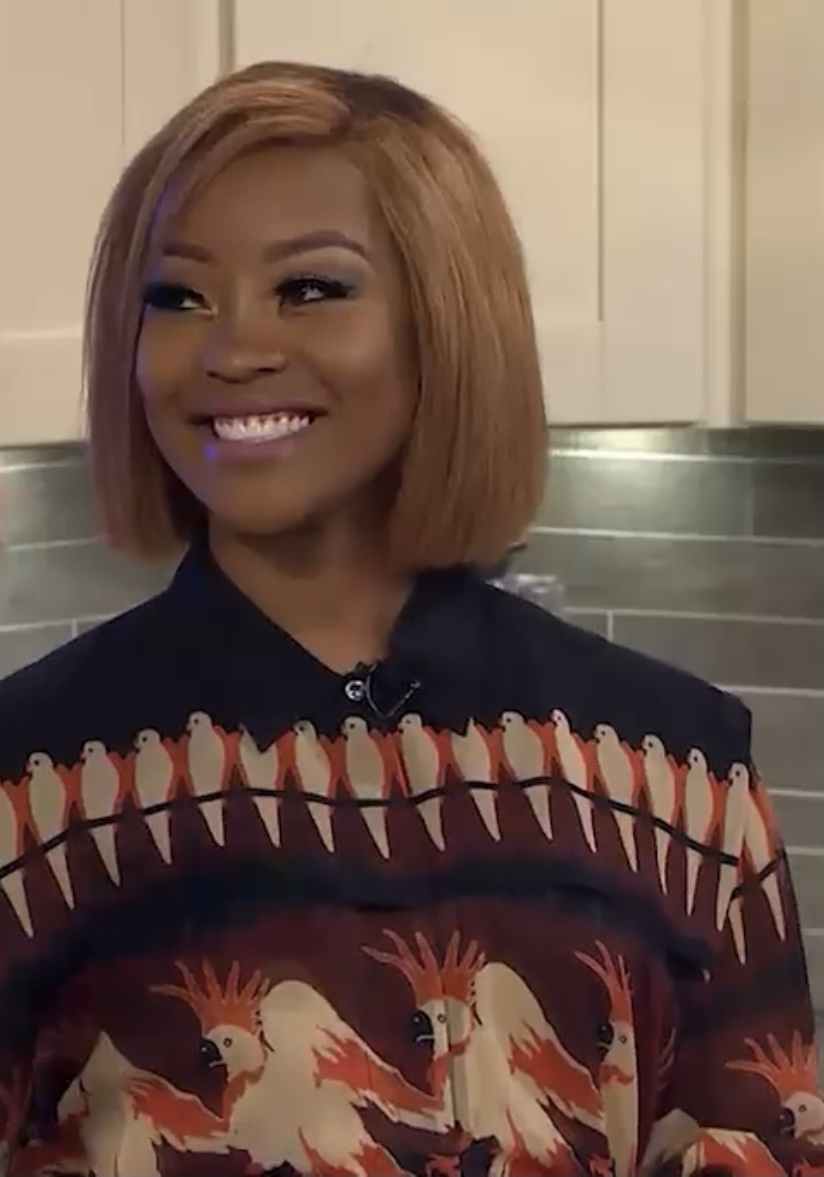
- Maseko in 2020
- Born: 3 July 1983 (age 42); Alexandra, Gauteng, South Africa
- Education: University of South Africa
- Years active: 2005–present
- Spouse: Gcina "GC" Lukhele (m. 2010; div. 2016)
- Children: 1
- Culinary career
- Previous restaurant: The Bread Basket
- Television shows: Top Chef South Africa; The Hostess with Lorna Maseko
- Website: www.lornamaseko.com

Lorna Maseko (born 3 July 1983), is a South African chef, media personality and former ballet dancer.

== Early life and education ==
Maseko was born and raised in the Johannesburg township of Alexandra. Her mother was a receptionist and her father was a taxi driver. She has an older brother and two younger sisters. Maseko took up ballet at the age of nine under the tuition of Martin Schonberg and qualified in the Cecchetti method. She pursued a Bachelor of Communications at the University of South Africa and later completed a year-long culinary course.

== Career ==
Dance was Maseko's primary profession until around the age of 25. She toured as young as 16 and competed in the Prix de Lausanne. In 2005, she was crowned the premiere black ballerina in South Africa. In 2007, she was cast as Kitri in the Pretoria production of Don Quixote. 18 months after leaving the South African Ballet Theatre, she returned to the stage in 2009 to star in the titular role of Carmen.

Maseko began working in television, presenting and producing Afro Showbiz News and The Weekender for SABC. She was a finalist on the 2006 season of Top Billing, which she returned to present in 2010. She was named November Woman In Action by True Love Magazine in 2007.

She was a judge on the South African version of So You Think You Can Dance in 2013, a contestant on the e.tv series I Love South Africa in 2014, and appeared in season 2 of the music talk show Zaziwa.

In 2015, Maseko competed in the Celebrity edition of MasterChef South Africa and discovered her passion for cooking in the process. She hosted the 2016 cooking reality series Top Chef SA and landed her own series The Hostess with Lorna Maseko on SABC3 the following year. Maseko opened The Bread Basket in Morningside Shopping Centre, although she no longer owns it. In 2018, she began posting videos on her YouTube channel Lorna With A Pinch Of Salt.

Maseko took her cooking to the international stage in 2019, making the cover of Women's Health. She hosted the World Restaurant Awards in February in Paris and became the guest speaker at TEDxKedgeBS at KEDGE Business School's Marseille campus. She then went to Stockholm in April to contribute to EAT Forum, a non-profit organization combatting world hunger. She participated in Taste of London and Taste of Dubai.

Maseko signed a book deal with NB Publishers and published her first cookbook Celebrate with Lorna Maseko in September 2019. It won best celebrity chef cookbook and best international cookbook at the 2020 Gourmand Awards. She was made an ambassador for the beauty brand Justine.

== Personal life ==
Maseko married Gcina "GC" Lukhele, a sales executive, in December 2010 at the Memoire in Muldersdrift. They divorced in 2016. In 2020, it was confirmed Maseko was in a relationship with former EFF politician and now recently MK Party member Floyd Shivambu; they have a daughter.

== Bibliography ==
- Celebrate with Lorna Maseko (2019) ISBN 978-0798177344
