= Will Meyrick =

Portuguese chef

- Born: 17 September 1976 (age 49); Portimao, Portugal
- Occupations: Chef, video producer, writer
- Years active: 1996–present
- Children: 3

Will Meyrick, born in Portimao, Portugal on 17 September 1976, is a Scottish celebrity chef based in Bali, Indonesia. He has siblings born in Beirut, lived in Italy and Peru, and moved to Scotland by the age of 16 He's married, with 3 children.
