= Éric Fréchon =

French chef

Éric Frechon
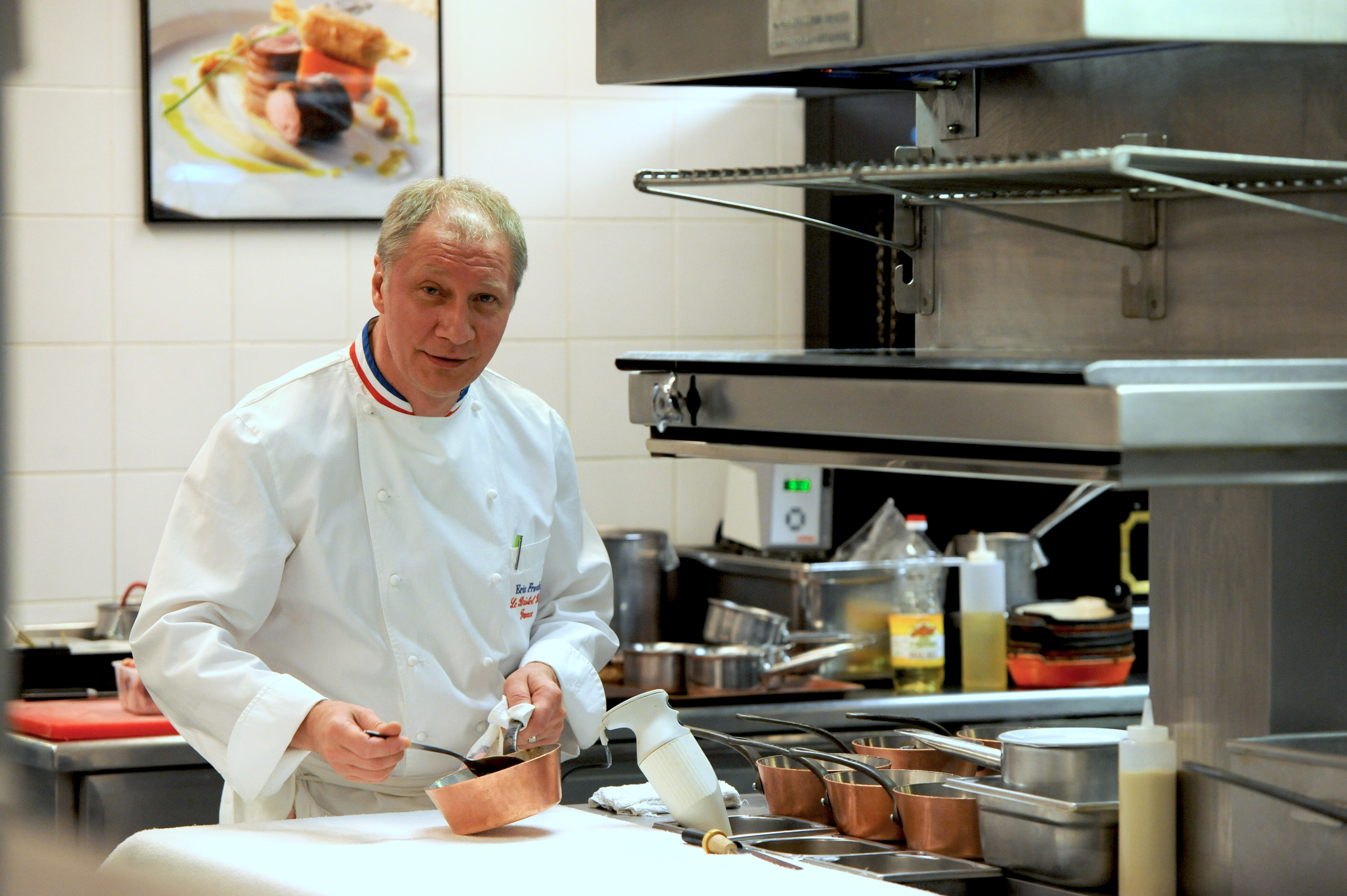
- Born: 16 November 1963 (age 62); Corbie, Somme, France
- Culinary career
- Cooking style: Haute cuisine
- Rating: Michelin stars
- Current restaurants: La Verrière d'Éric Frechon (Paris); Épicure (Hôtel Le Bristol Paris)

Éric Frechon (born 16 November 1963) is a French chef, Meilleur Ouvrier de France and three stars at the Guide Michelin. He has been described as "chef royalty" and received positive reviews when he was chef of the restaurant Épicure at the Hôtel Le Bristol in Paris. In 2015 he re-opened the hotel restaurant Céleste which is part of The Lanesborough

== Restaurants ==
- 1995: La Verrière d'Éric Frechon (next to the Buttes Chaumont) 19th arrondissement of Paris (closed)
- 2010: Le Mini Palais (at the Grand Palais) 8th arrondissement of Paris
- 2013: Le Lazare (Gare Saint Lazare) 8th arrondissement of Paris
- 2015: The Lanesborough

== Honours ==
- 1993: Meilleur Ouvrier de France
- 2008: Chevalier (Knight) of the Legion of Honour named by French President Nicolas Sarkozy
- 2009: Three stars at the Guide Michelin

== See also ==
- List of Michelin starred restaurants
