= Thierry Marx =

French chef (born 1959)

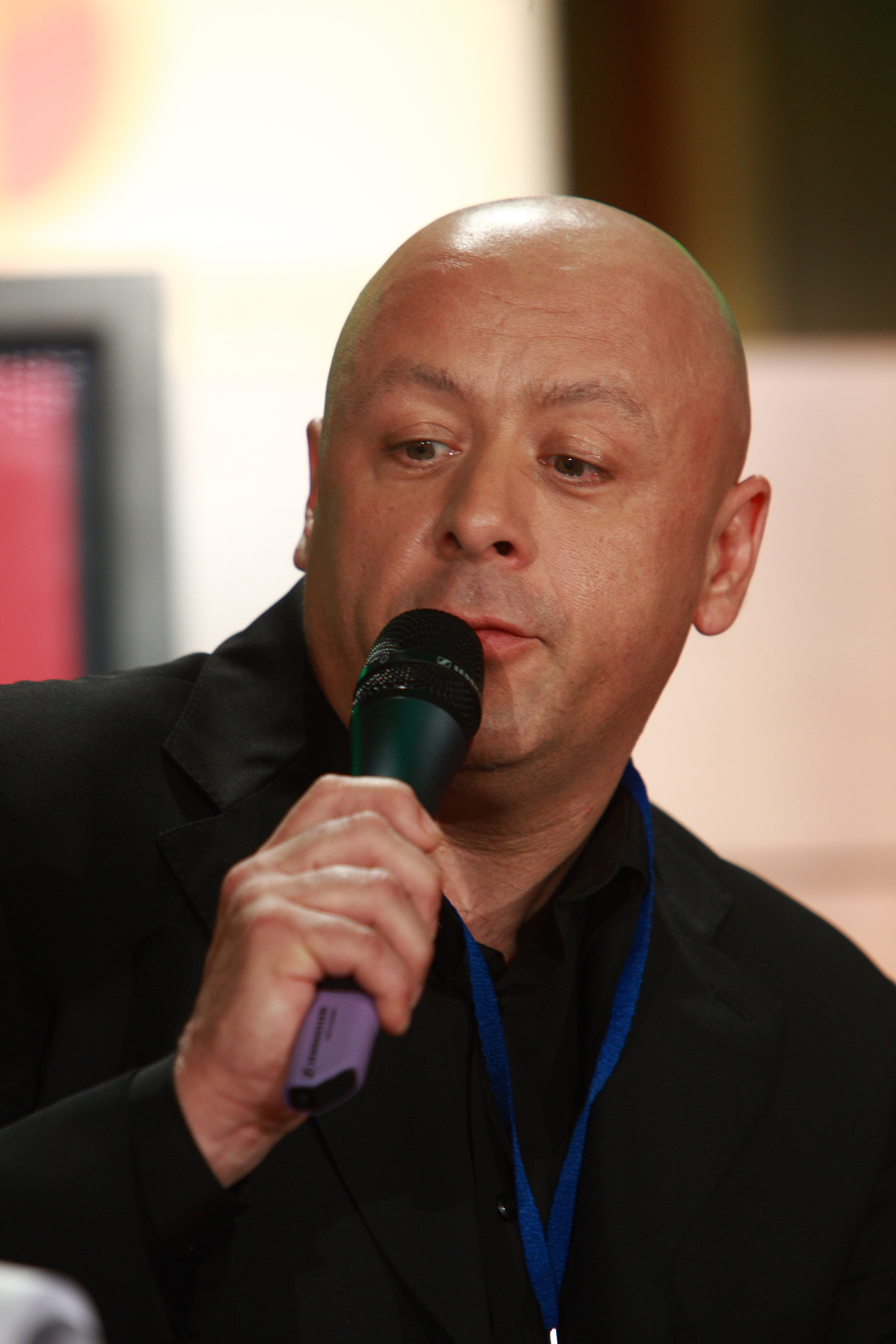
- Thierry Marx in 2008
- Born: 19 September 1959 (age 67); Paris, France
- Culinary career
- Cooking style: Molecular Gastronomy
- Rating
- Michelin stars
- Previous restaurant
- Sur Mesure par Thierry Marx at Mandarin Oriental, Paris
- Television show
- Top Chef (M6)
- Website: www.thierrymarx.com

Thierry Marx (born 19 September 1959) is a French chef, specialised in molecular gastronomy.

== Biography ==
Thierry Marx was born and raised in Paris in the area of Ménilmontant. His grandfather, Marcel Marx, was a Polish Jewish refugee and communist resistant during World War II.

Thierry Marx thought of becoming a baker, but later joined the Compagnons du Devoir in 1978 and graduated with a degree (CAP) of pastry chef, chocolatier and ice cream parlor. He joined the army as a paratrooper in the marines and was a casque bleu in 1980 during the Lebanese Civil War.

At his return to France, he went through various jobs, including being a security guard, a cash transporter and a warehouseman, but finally went back into cooking. He worked as a chef assistant at Ledoyen, Taillevent and Robuchon. He later became chef at the Regency Hotel in Sydney and traveled to Singapore, Hong Kong and Tokyo.

In 1988, he received one star at the Guide Michelin for the restaurant Roc en Val in Tours, and from 1990 to 1995 for the Cheval Blanc in Nîmes, where he received one star in 1991.

Chef at the Relais et Château Cordeillan-Bages at Pauillac since 1996, he received his first star there in the Michelin in 1996 and a second one in 1999. He was elected by Gault Millau Chef of the Year in 2000.

In February 2008, the daily economic newspaper Les Échos interviewed him for his first portrait in the French economic newspaper.

From 2010 to 2014, he was a judge on the French version of the cooking TV show Top Chef on M6.

Since April 2010, he is a head of the restaurant Mandarin Oriental, Paris, in which he opened in June 2011, the restaurants Sur-mesure by Thierry Marx, Le Camélia and a pastry counter. In 2012, his restaurant Sur-mesure by Thierry Marx received two stars at the Guide Michelin.

As of 2019, he is also in charge of the Jules Verne restaurant on the second floor of the Eiffel Tower.

== Bibliography ==
=== Cook books ===
- Planète Marx
- Easy Marx
- Marx
- Sweet Marx
- Street Marx
- Bon!
- Best of Marx

=== Other books ===
- Comment je suis devenu chef étoilé (biography)

== Career ==
In December 2018, he confided to Isabelle Morizet that, "of the dozen kids from that time, only two are still alive".

He joined the Compagnons du Devoir in 1978, where he obtained the Certificates of Professional Aptitude (CAP) for pastry chef, chocolate maker and ice cream maker. But at 19, Thierry Marx enlisted in the army as a parachutist in the marine infantry. He found himself a blue helmet in 1980 during the Lebanese Civil War before joining the Lebanese phalanxes.

Back in France, he says he is "in pieces", he is a security guard, cash transporter, handler, then finally goes back to the kitchen. He worked for Ledoyen, Taillevent then Robuchon. Noticed in his brigade, he finds himself head chef at the Regency Hotel in Sydney (Australia) and travels a lot (Singapore, Hong Kong, Tokyo).

In 1988, he received a first star in the Michelin Guide for the restaurant Roc en Val in Montlouis-sur-Loire, then from 1990 to 1995 at the Cheval Blanc in Nîmes where he received a star in 1991. Chef at the Relais and Château Cordeillan-Bages in Pauillac from 1996, he obtained his first Michelin star in 1996 then a second in 1999. Hope for a third star since 2004. He was elected "Cook of the Year" in 2006 by Gault & Millau. On February 15, 2008, the economic daily Les Échos devotes an interview to him, accompanied by an introduction by the journalist and blogger "Ménilmontant, mais oui madam..." This is his first portrait in a French economic newspaper. In October 2008 He is at the initiative of Foodlab, a kitchen lab at the border between gastronomy and science. It is a place of experimentation, bringing together scientists and internationally renowned chefs.

From February 2010 to April 2014, he was one of the jurors for the Top Chef program on M6 with Ghislaine Arabian, Christian Constant and Jean-François Piège.

In 2012, his restaurant Sur-mesure by Thierry Marx received two stars in the Michelin guide, and currently 5 toques (19/20) in the Gault & Millau Guide.

On April 11, 2012, he was made a Knight of Arts and Letters by Frédéric Mitterrand. The same year, he was honorary president of the François-Rabelais Meetings.

In 2013, he collaborated with the brand 3 Suisses for which he co-created with the visual artist Mathilde de l'Écotais, a capsule collection.

In 2014, he was chef of the year in the Pudlo guide and received the consecration of the three plates.

In 2015, for Lustucru, Thierry Marx humorously shoots an advertisement: "The Martians are back on your screen! Always so greedy, they taste their Lustucru pasta when suddenly...".

He participates, as a coach, in the program Un village à la diète broadcast on July 20, 2018, on TF1, alongside nutritionist Vanessa Rolland, athletics trainer Renaud Longuèvre, and Miss France 2011 Laury Thilleman.

In 2018, in tandem with Frédéric Anton, he took over the restaurant Le Jules Verne, located on the Eiffel Tower.

Also in 2018, he appeared in the series Joséphine guardian angel in his own role in episode 1 of season 19 entitled Graine de chef.
