= Jean-François Piège =

French chef (born 1970)

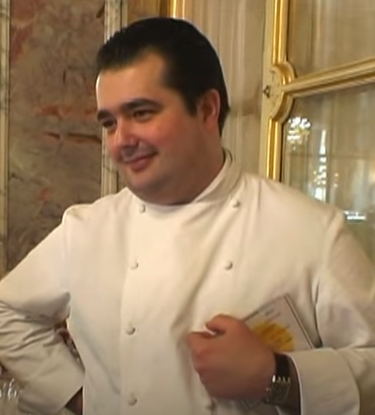
- Born: 25 September 1970 (age 56); Valence, Drôme, France
- Culinary career
- Cooking style: Haute cuisine
- Rating
- Michelin stars
- Current restaurants
- Restaurant Jean-François Piège; Brasserie Thoumieux; Hôtel Thoumieux
- Previous restaurant
- Les Ambassadeurs (Paris)
- Television show
- Top Chef (France)
- Website: www.jfpiege.com www.thoumieux.com

Jean-François Piège (born 25 September 1970) is a French chef, two stars at the Guide Michelin.

== Training and career ==
In 1991, he started working as a chef assistant for ten months at the Palais de l'Élysée during his military service. He worked notably with Bernard Vaussion, sous-chef at that time. After having worked with famous other chefs for several years (Bruno Cirino, Yves Camdeborde, Christian Constant, Alain Ducasse), he became the chef of the restaurant Les Ambassadeurs at the Hôtel de Crillon in Paris, not hesitating on mixing the codes of the palace with popular cuisine.

In 2009, he started a new project and created with his colleague Thierry Costes a place with a unique personality in Paris. The domain of Thoumieux is declined in different places : the Brasserie Thoumieux (2009), the restaurant Jean-François Piège (2010) and the Hôtel Thoumieux (2011).

In February 2011, Jean-François Piège received directly two Michelin stars for his restaurant. His colleagues named him a few months later chef of the year after a secret vote organised by the special magazine Le Chef among 6,000 professionals (cooking chefs, pastry chefs, sommeliers).

in 2014 he decided to open a restaurant called Clover with his wife Élodie, located in Saint-Germain-des-Prés. A year later the couple opened the Grand Restaurant, which was awarded two stars by the Guide Michelin in February 2016.

Piège also opened another restaurant named the Clover Grill in the centre of Paris. At the beginning of 2018, Clover was renamed Clover Green and started having a special focus on vegetables.

== Television ==
He shares his knowledge and his passion through his books and as a guest in various television programs such as Un dîner presque parfait (the French version of Come Dine with Me) and 100% Mag on M6. From 2010 to 2019, he is a member of the jury in the French version of Top Chef on the same channel.

== Honours ==
- 2001 : 3 Michelin stars for the restaurant of the Plaza Athénée
- 2005 : 2 Michelin stars for the restaurant Les Ambassadeurs
- 2005 : Chef of the year by the guide Pudlo for the restaurant Les Ambassadeurs
- 2005 : Chef of the year by the guide Champérard for the restaurant Les Ambassadeurs
- 2007 : Chef of the year by the guide Gault et Millau for the restaurant Les Ambassadeurs
- 2008 : Chevalier (Knight) of the National Order of Merit
- 2010 : "Lillet / Lebey de l'Innovation" price for the Brasserie Thoumieux
- 2011 : "Omnivore Maison" price for the Hôtel Thoumieux
- 2011 : Event of the year by the guide Pudlo for the restaurant Jean-François Piège
- 2011 : 2 Michelin stars for the restaurant Jean-François Piège
- 2011 : Chef of the year by the revue Le Chef
- 2014 - Named "Creator of the Year" at the cooking festival OMNIVORE
- 2014 - Jean-François Piège nominated Vice-President of "Grandes Tables du Monde"
- 2016 - 2 Michelin stars for his restaurant Le Grand Restaurant in Paris, 8th arrondissement
- 2016 - Receives Lebey Prize for Best Meat dish for his "sweetbreads cooked over walnut shells"
- 2016 - Voted "Chef of the Year" by the 2016 Pudlo Guide
- 2016 - Voted "Chef of the Year" by the 2016 Champérard Guide
- 2017 - Clover Grill receives the "Coup de Cœur" awarded by the Guide Lebey Paris/London
- 2017 - Clover Grill voted as one of the best restaurants of the year in the 2017 Hot List of Condé Nast Traveller Magazine
- 2018 - Le Grand Restaurant voted best restaurant of the year by the World Luxury Restaurant Awards
- 2018 - Le Grand Restaurant scored 19/20 and five hats by the guide Gault & Millau
- 2019 - 1 Michelin star for his restaurant La Poule au Pot in Paris, 1st arrondissement

== Books ==
- 2007 - Côté Crillon, côté maison (Editions Flammarion)
- 2008 - Jean-François Piège dans votre cuisine (Editions Flammarion)
- 2011 - Le Petit Dictionnaire d’Alexandre Dumas et des recettes de Jean-François Piège (Editions J’ai Lu) et Best Of Jean-François Piège (Editions Alain Ducasse)
- 2013 - Manifeste L’art de manger (Editions Autrement) et Jean-François Piège (Editions Flammarion)
- 2014 - Jean-François Piège, English version (Editions Flammarion) et Jean-François Piège, le poisson à sa façon (Kéribus Editions)
- 2016 - Jean-François Piège pour tous (Editions Hachette)
- 2017 - Les desserts de Jean-François Piège pour tous (Editions Hachette)
- 2018 - Zéro gras (Editions Hachette)
- 2019 - Les Tartes de Jean-François Piège pour tous (Editions Hachette)

== Television programs ==
- 2008 to 2011 - Un dîner Presque parfait on channel M6 : Head judge seasons 2 to 4
- 2010 to 2019 - Top Chef on channel M6 : Head judge from seasons 1 to 10

== See also ==
- List of Michelin starred restaurants
