= Stéphanie Le Quellec =

French chef (born 1981)

- Born: Stéphanie Lecocq; December 6, 1981 (age 44); Enghiens-les-Bains, France

Stéphanie Le Quellec, born Lecocq (born December 6, 1981, in Enghien-les-Bains, Île-de-France, France) is a 2-star chef.

She won season 2 of Top Chef on M6 in 2011. She is one of the rare female chefs to have received 2 stars from the Michelin Guide.

== Biography ==
Stéphanie Lecocq grew up in Enghien-les-Bains in a family who loved gastronomy. She started cooking at age 7 or 8. After high school, she spent 5 years studying at the hospitality school Albert-de-Mun, in Paris. She earned her BTS degree at age 19.

She began her career in 2001 at restaurant Le Cinq at the Four Seasons Hotel George V in Paris, where she also met her future husband David Le Quellec, another chef at the restaurant. Later, they had 3 children (Baptiste, Maxime, and Arthur). She became sous-chef under Eric Briffard in 2006.

In 2013, she became head of the restaurant La Scène, in the 5-star hotel Prince de Galles, on the avenue George V in Paris and in 2014, she received her first Michelin star. In March 2019, a few weeks after receiving her second Michelin star, she left the restaurant.

On October 9, 2019, Le Quellec opened her own restaurant named on Matignon Street in Paris, called La Scène. On January 27, 2020, her new restaurant received two Michelin stars.

Le Quellec has made several television appearances. In 2011, she was on Season 2 of Top Chef on French television channel M6. In 2017, she was in the short film Ma Mère cuisine mieux que la tienne ! ("My Mom is a Better Cook Than Yours!") on M6.
