= Meilleur Ouvrier de France =

French artisan competition

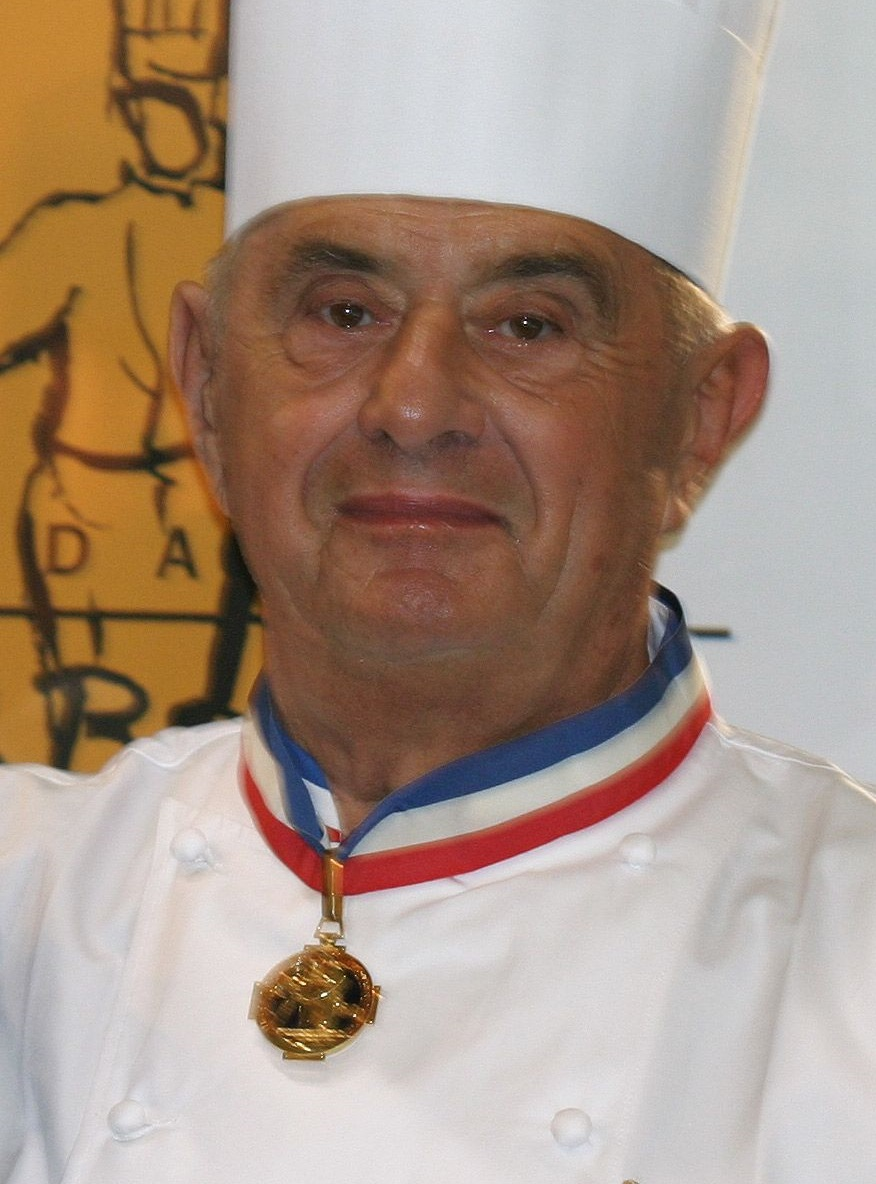
Chef Paul Bocuse wearing his Meilleur Ouvrier de France medal

Meilleur Ouvrier de France (French: [mɛjœʁ uvʁije d(ə) fʁɑ̃s]; MOF) is a competition for craftsmen held in France every four years. The winning candidates receive a medal.

== Description ==
The title of Meilleur Ouvrier de France is a unique and prestigious award in France, according to category of trades in a contest among professionals. This contest is organized and recognized as a third-level degree by the French Ministry of Labour. The President of the French Republic is granted honorary membership with the title MOF honoris causa. The awarding of medals occurs at the Sorbonne, in Paris, during a large reunion followed by a ceremony at the Élysée in the presence of the President of the French Republic.

This award for special abilities is unique in the world. Created in 1924, initially between the best workers of the era aged 23 and over, this contest was given the title of Meilleur Ouvrier de France (Best Craftsman of France). Today, by the diversity of specialities, the list of which is regularly updated, the award has also been awarded to more modern trades and high technology fields.

In this competition, the candidate is given a certain amount of time and basic materials not only to create a masterpiece, but to do so with a goal of approaching perfection. The chosen method, the organization, the act, the speed, the know-how and the respect for the rules of the trade are verified by a jury just as much as is the final result. The winning candidates receive a medal and retain their title for life, with the indication of the specialty, the year following the one in which they obtain the title.

This prestigious title is equally recognized by professionals and the greater public in France, particularly among artisan-merchants such as pastrymakers, hairdressers, butchers, jewelers, and others whose trades are recognized, particularly those for more luxurious goods.

The Organizing Committee for Labor Exhibitions (COET) is an administrative body, placed under the authority of the French Ministry of National Education. It was created in 1935 and is responsible for the material organization of the “Meilleur Ouvrier de France” competition and the national labor exhibitions that conclude it. It became an association under the law of 1901 in 1961.

== Trade Groups ==
The competition recognizes accomplishments in nearly a hundred professions across seventeen trade groups with subcategories including (but not limited to):

2018 Pastry Competition
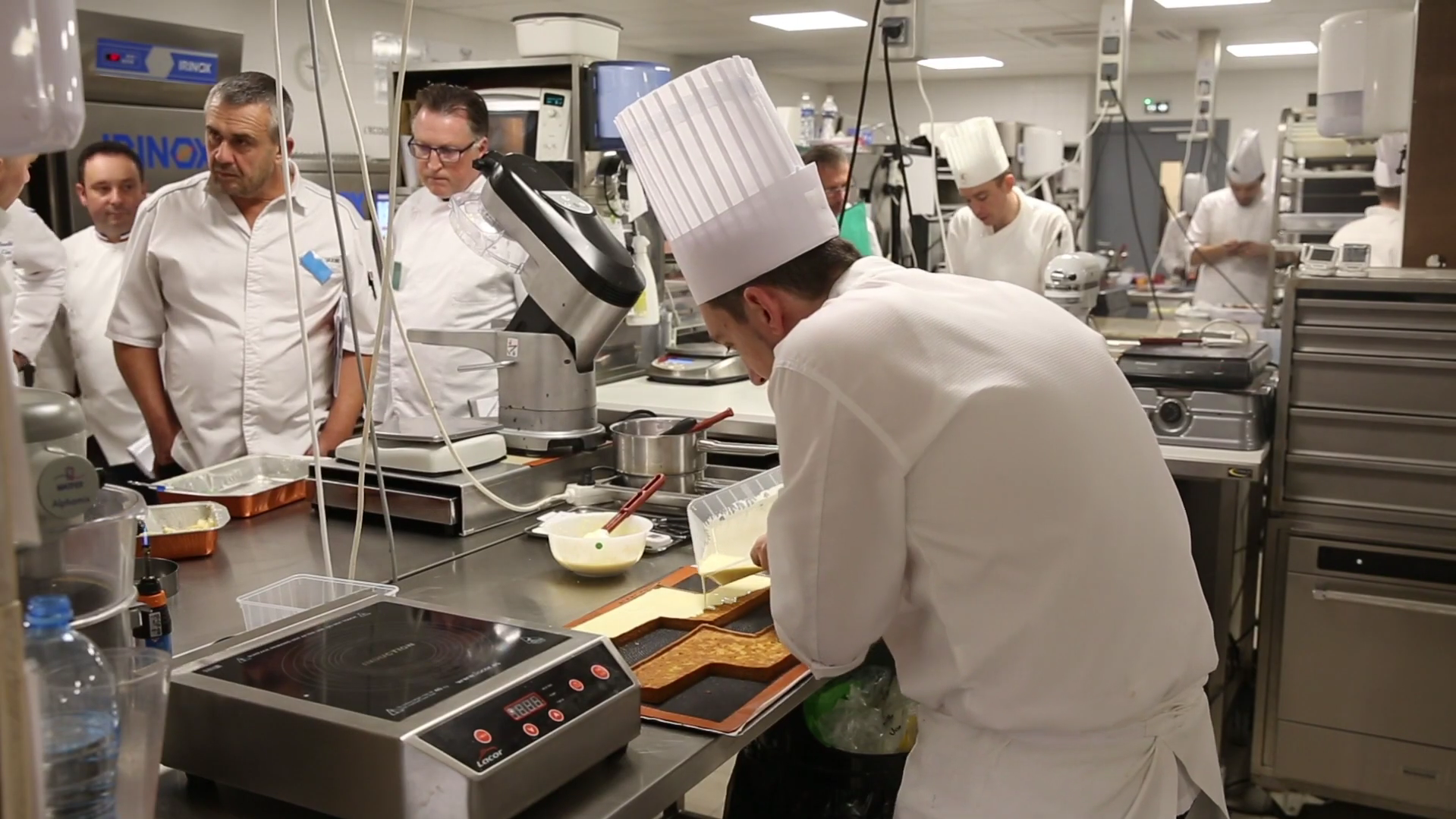
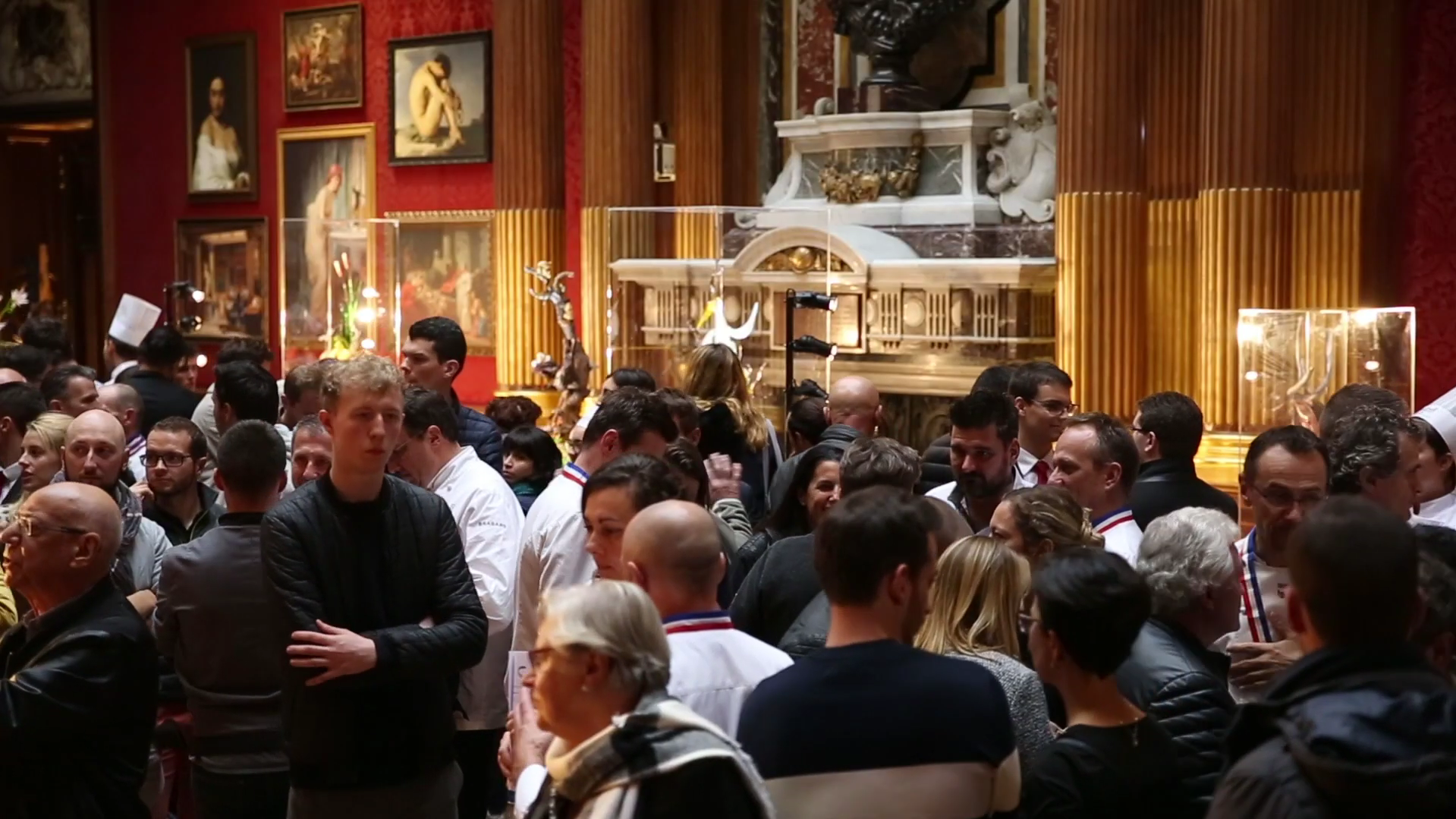

=== Restaurants and hotels ===
- Caterers
- Restaurateurs and chefs
- Maîtres d'hôtel and servers
- Hotel receptionists
- Sommeliers

=== Culinary arts ===
- Pastry chefs
- Butchers
- Charcutiers
- Bakers
- Frozen dessert makers
- Chocolatiers
- Cheesemongers
- Fishmongers
- Grocers
- Coffee roasters

=== Construction, public works, and architecture ===
- Carpenters
- Painters
- Plumbers, installers of sanitation systems
- Stonemasons
- Cementworkers
- Locksmiths
- Climate engineers
- Stove fitters
- Sculptors
- Plasterworkers
- Mosaics artists
- Marbleworkers
- Architectural scale model makers

=== Home textiles and leather ===
- Textile designers
- Textile printers
- Tapestries and carpet restorationists
- Weavers
- Taxidermists

=== Woodworking, carpentry, and cabinetry ===
- Cabinetmakers
- Furniture makers
- Wood turners and benders
- Wood sculptors
- Wood gilders
- Framers
- Marqueteurs
- Coopers
- Wicker workers

=== Metalsmithing ===
- Boilermaking
- Copperware artisans
- Sheet metalworkers
- Ironwork artisans
- Blacksmiths
- Silversmiths

=== Metallurgy and industry ===
- Mechanics and machinists
- Electrical equipment makers and installers
- Tool makers
- Solderers
- Composite materials

=== Ceramics and glass ===
- Stained glass artisans
- Santon makers
- Glassblowers and crystal artisans
- Ceramic restorationists

=== Clothing ===
- Milliners
- Tailors
- Furriers
- Lingerie makers
- Ready-to-wear apparel makers
- Haute couturiers

=== Fashion accessories and beauty ===
- Lacemakers
- Embroiderers
- Glove makers
- Cobblers
- Hairdressers
- Make up professionals

=== Jewelry ===
- Goldsmiths
- Stone setters
- Diamond cutters

=== Precision techniques ===
- Cutlery
- Clockmaking
- Glassesmaking
- Dentalworks
- Armouryworks

=== Engraving ===
- Steel engravers
- Printing plate engravers
- Heraldic engravers

=== Communications, media, and audiovisual ===
- Graphic designers
- Printers
- Photographers
- Photography lab technicians
- Silkscreeners
- Typographers
- Bookbinders

=== Music ===
- Luthiers

=== Agriculture and landscaping ===
- Florists
- Landscape designers

=== Commerce and sales ===
- Retailers
- Shopkeepers
- Salespeople

== Notable MOF winners ==
- Emile Drouhin (MOF 1958)
- Joël Robuchon (MOF 1976)
- André Soltner (MOF 1967)
- Claude Deligne (MOF 1973)
- Olivier Bajard (Métier de bouche)
- Paul Bocuse (Métier de bouche)
- Matthieu Miossec (Métier de bouche)
- Laurent Dassont (Métier de bouche)
- Pascal Caffet (Métier de bouche)
- René Fontaine (b. 1946, MOF 1976: Métier de bouche)
- Yves Thuriès (Métier de bouche)
- Roger Vergé (Métier de bouche)
- Dominique Laporte (2004: Métier de bouche-Sommelier)
- Jacques Torres
- Alain Fabregues (MOF 1991)
- Michel Roux (MOF 1976)
- Virginie Basselot
- Guy Lassausaie (Métier de bouche)
- Philippe Etchebest
- Stéphane Tréand (MOF 2004)
- Marcel Chevalier (1921–2008), most famous for being France’s last executioner, but also was an M.O.F. in printing

Many members of the Compagnons du Devoir are also M.O.F.

== See also ==
- Kings of Pastry, a 2009 documentary film about the M.O.F. pastrymaking competition
