= Philippe Etchebest =

French chef

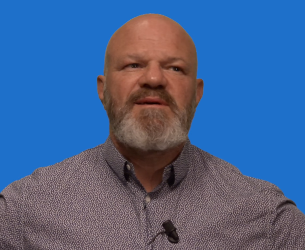
- Philippe Etchebest in 2018
- Born: December 2, 1966 (age 59); Soissons, Aisne, France
- Spouse: Dominique Etchebest
- Culinary career
- Cooking style: French cuisine
- Rating: Michelin stars
- Television show: Cauchemar en cuisine
- Website: philippe-etchebest.com

Philippe Etchebest (French pronunciation: [filip ɛtʃəbɛst]; born 2 December 1966) is a French chef. He was awarded two Michelin stars at the Hostellerie de Plaisance in Saint-Émilion, France. He appears on French television in Top Chef, Objectif Top Chef and Cauchemar en cuisine, the French-language version of Gordon Ramsay's Kitchen Nightmares.

== Career ==
Etchebest's father owned a restaurant in Bordeaux and his family lived above. In his youth, he played rugby for the Bègles-Bordeaux rugby club and practised judo. At the age of fifteen, he chose to pursue a career in catering over professional rugby. Etchebest trained at the Talence Bordeaux culinary school.

By the age of 22 he was second chef de cuisine at the Paris restaurant Clos Longchamps, and moved on to Jardins de l'Opéra in Toulouse in 1992. He subsequently became head chef at Château Grand Barrail, where he stayed for five years and where, in 2000, he was named Meilleur Ouvrier de France. He moved to Château des Reynats in 2001 where he won his first Michelin star. Etchebest joined the Hostellerie de Plaisance in Saint-Emilion in 2003. The restaurant already held a Michelin star which he retained, and added a second star in 2008.

He began presenting the cooking reality television show Cauchemar en cuisine on French channel M6 in 2011. The show is the French language equivalent of Gordon Ramsay's British and American television shows Kitchen Nightmares. Etchebest prefers to know as little as possible in advance about each restaurant visited in the show in order to keep his reactions spontaneous.

Since 2015, he also is a member of the jury in Top Chef's French adaptation, aired on M6.

In 2025, Etchebest was featured as the Replacer in the French ads for Call of Duty: Black Ops 7.

== Personal life ==
He has an adopted son named Louis Oscar, and is married to Dominique.
