= Christian Constant =

French chef and entrepreneur

- Born: 18 May 1950 (age 75); Montauban, Tarn-et-Garonne, France
- Culinary career
- Rating(s): Michelin stars
- Current restaurant(s): Le Violon d'Ingres; Le Café Constant; Les Cocottes de Christian Constant Tour Eiffel; Les Cocottes de Christian Constant Arc-de-Triomphe; Le Bibent; Le Bistrot Constant
- Television show(s): Top Chef (France)
- Website: www.maisonconstant.com

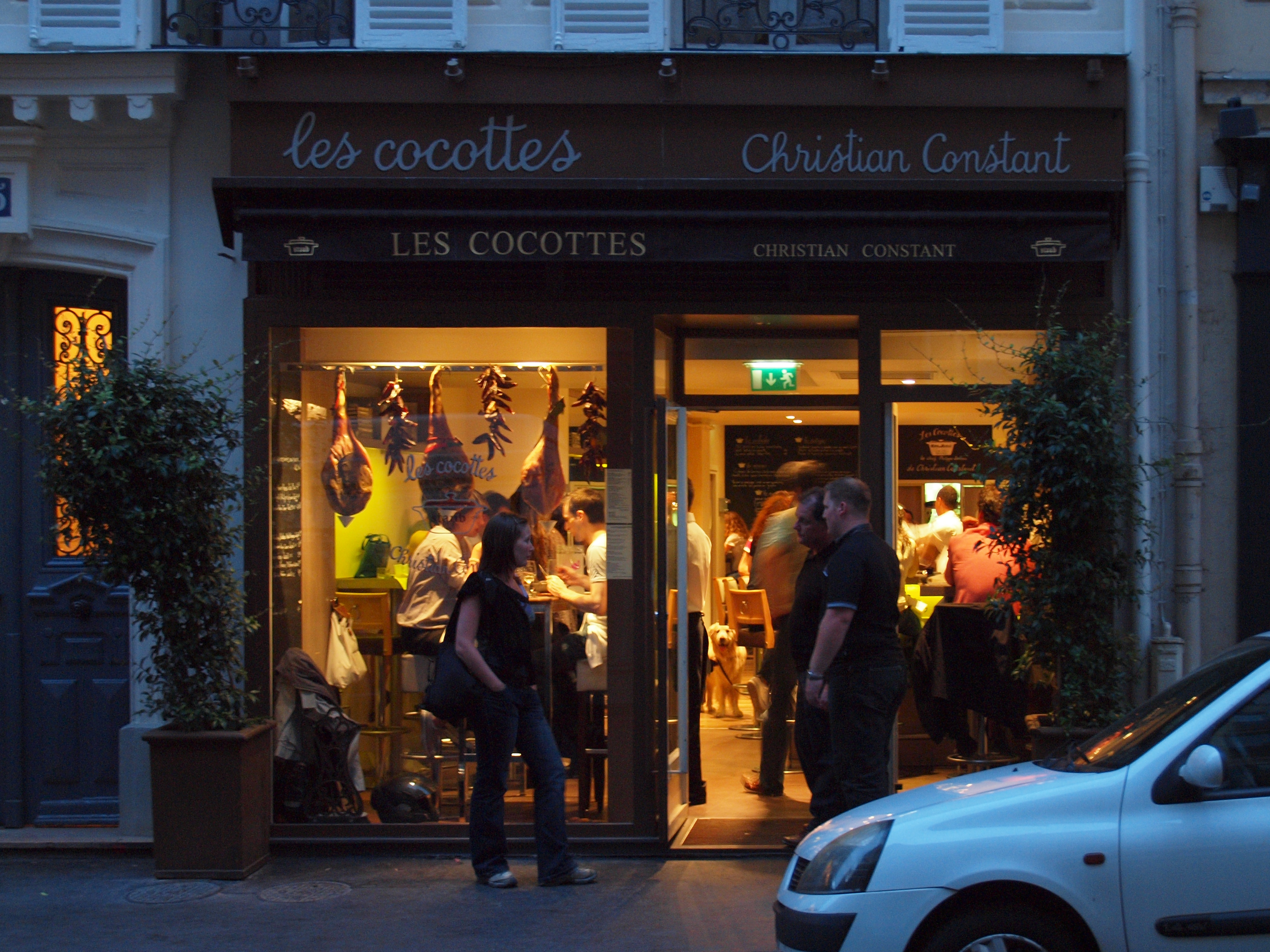
Les cocottes tour eiffel

Christian Constant (born 18 May 1950) is a French chef and entrepreneur.

== Early life and career ==
Christian Constant was born in Montauban, Tarn-et-Garonne in the region of Midi-Pyrénées. He began his career as a chef in 1988 at the Hôtel Crillon in Paris. Afterwards he was appointed chef at the Hôtel Ritz. In 1996 he founded his first restaurant Le Violon d'Ingres which received one Michelin star.

Today he owns six restaurants, each with its own style and chef : Le Violon d'Ingres, Le Café Constant, Les Cocottes Tour Eiffel, Les Cocottes Arc-de-Triomphe, restaurants offering traditional recipes cooked in Staub Dutch ovens. All of these are in Paris. Since 8 June 2011, he has also owned Le Bibent, a brasserie located in Toulouse, and near his hometown, since 2014, Le Bistrot Constant. All of his restaurants are open 7 days a week.

== Television ==
From 2010 to 2014, he was a member of the jury in the French version of Top Chef on M6. He also presented on the same channel a similar short program titled Astuce de Chef alternatively with the other members of the jury, where he shows some cooking tips while preparing a dish.
