= Osterlind =

Osterlind is a surname. Notable people with the surname include:

- Allan Österlind (1855–1938), Swedish painter
- Anders Osterlind (1887–1960), French painter
- Richard Osterlind (born 1948), mentalist
