= Severin Nilsson =

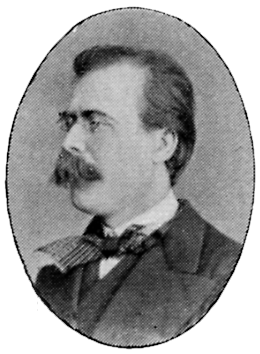
Severin Nilsson, from the Svenskt Porträttgalleri XX

Johan Severin Nilsson (14 January 1846 – 24 November 1918) was a Swedish painter and photographer.

== Biography ==
Nilsson was born in Asige Parish, Halland. His father was a blacksmith. In 1865, at the age of eighteen, he enrolled as a student at the Royal Swedish Academy of Arts in Stockholm; graduating in 1871. While there, he and Ernst Josephson became good friends. In 1873, they went to Paris together. On the way, they paid a visit to the painter, Bengt Nordenberg in Düsseldorf and were influenced by the Düsseldorf School.

In Paris, he studied under Léon Bonnat for three years. He also learned some photography. When he returned home, he obtained some photographic equipment and took his first pictures in Halland in 1875. He often worked "in parallel", using both camera and brush. He was also one of the first Swedish documentary photographers. Inspired by Arthur Hazelius, he made photographic studies of public life, especially in the village where he was born. Most of his pictures of people appear, however, to have been staged.

His paintings were mostly portraits, landscapes and genre scenes. A prolific artist, he participated in numerous exhibitions and left behind a large and diverse body of work. He died in Stockholm in 1918.

His works may be seen at the Nationalmuseum and the Kalmar Konstmuseum.

== Paintings and photographs ==
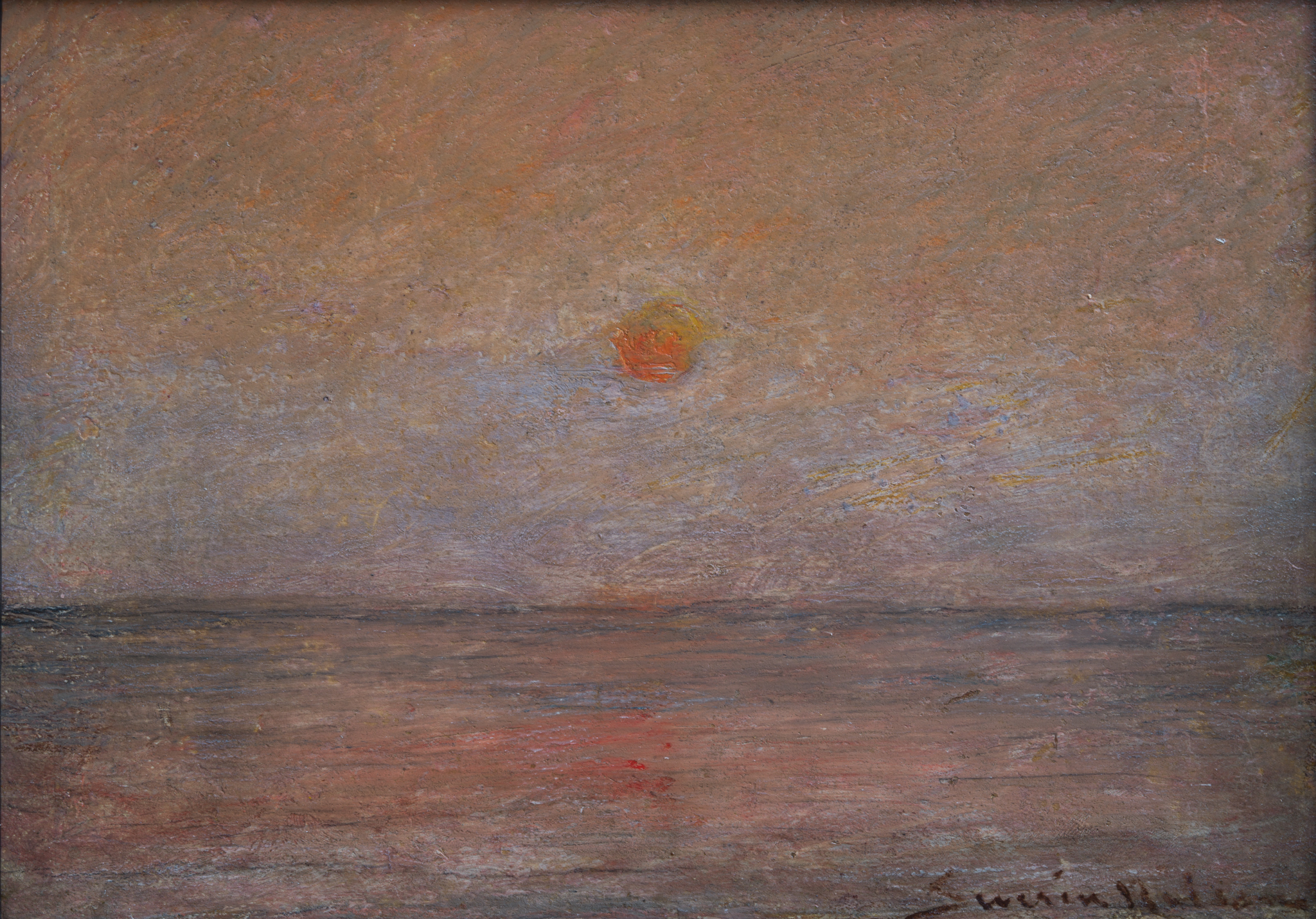
Sunset, c.1875

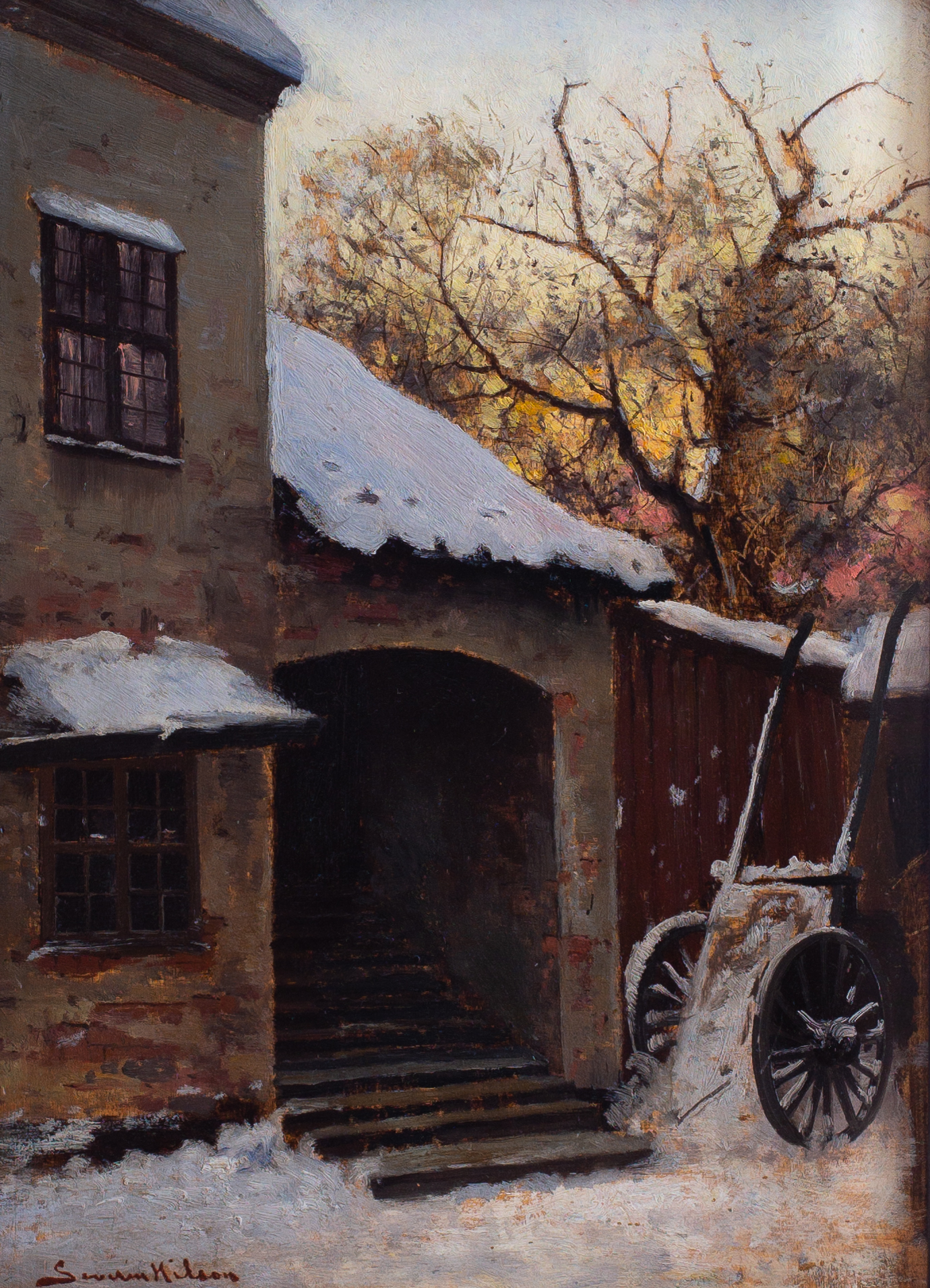
Stockholm Backyard With Church in Distance (Likely Katarina Church)

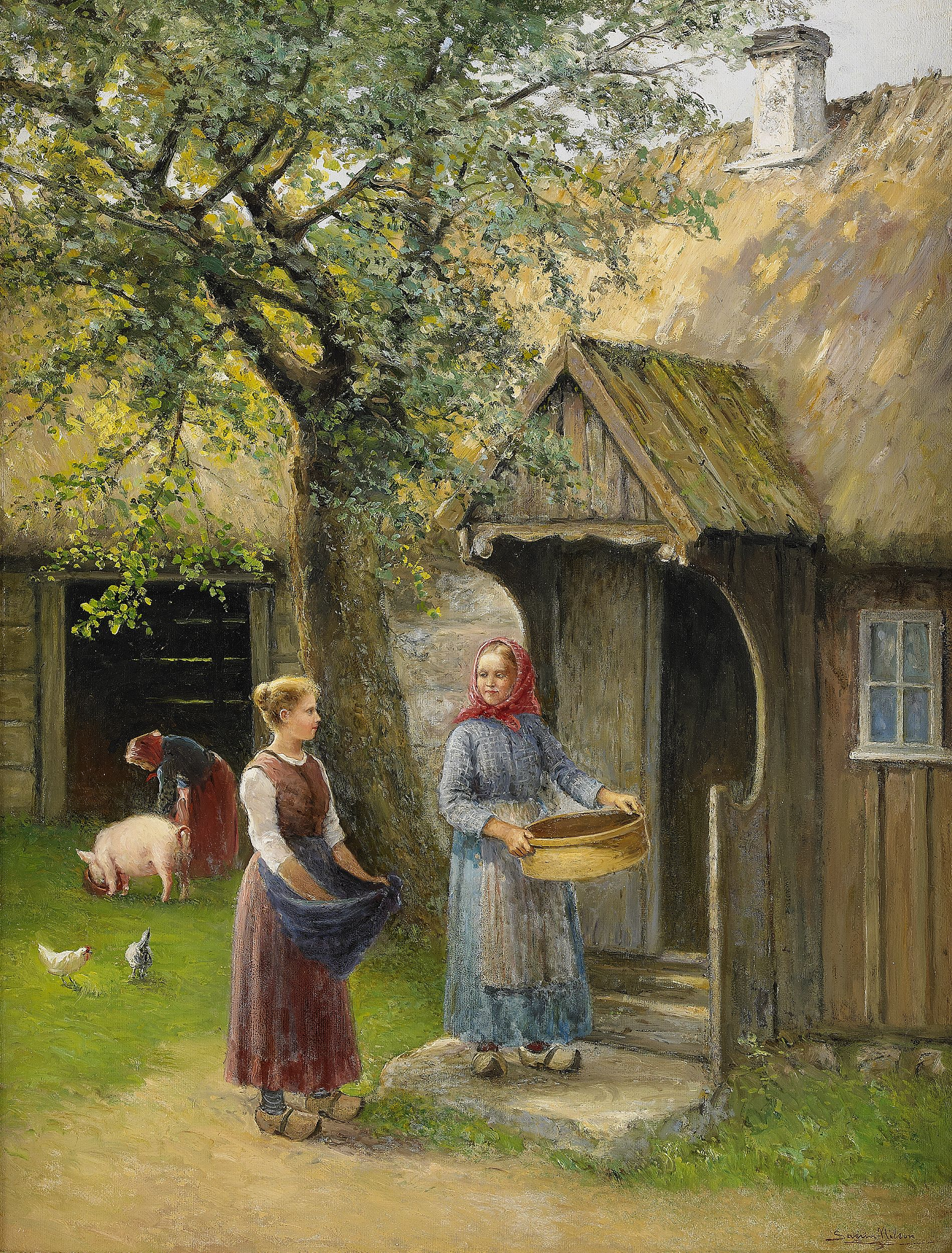
Farm Yard Idyll

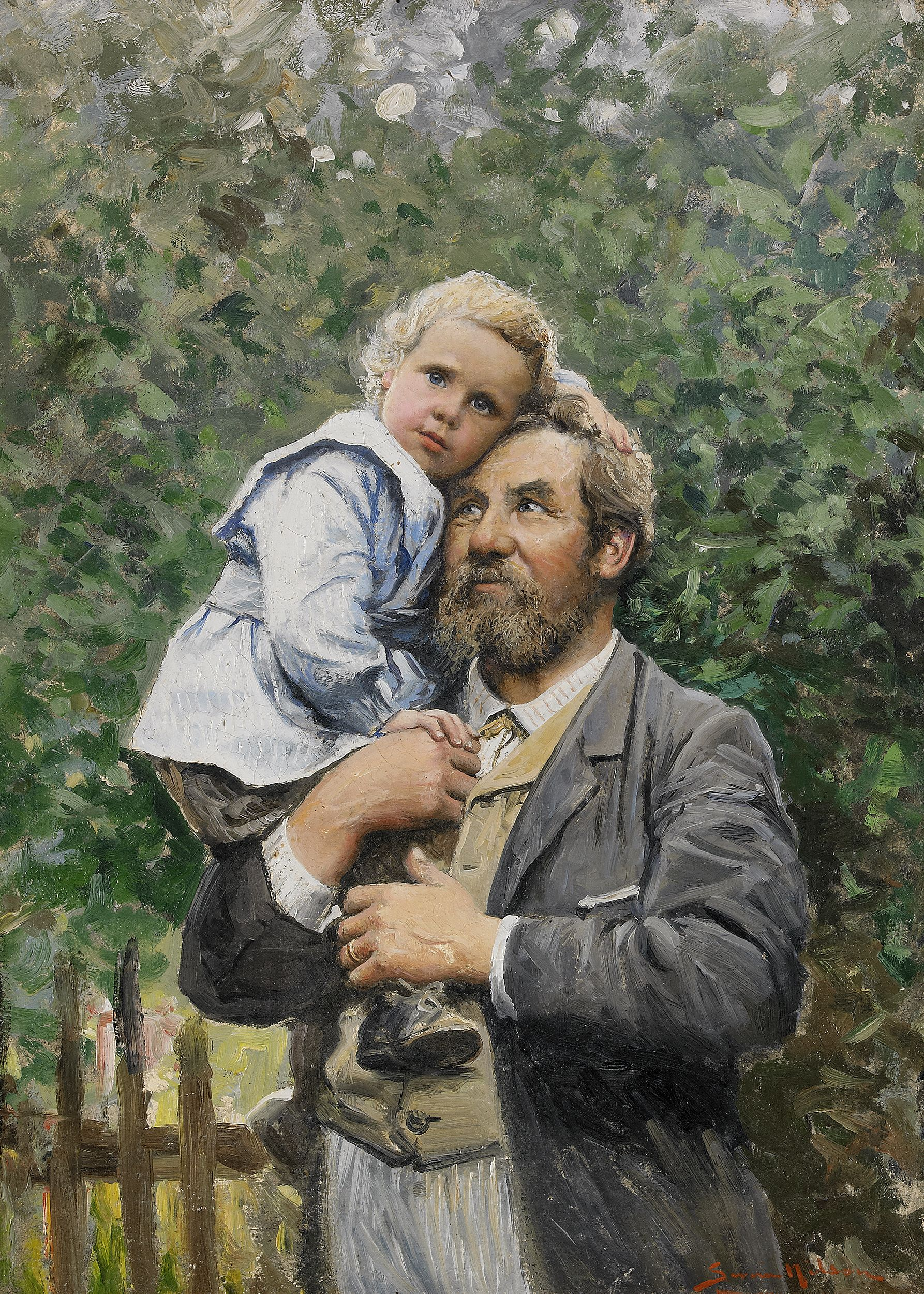
In Daddy's Arms

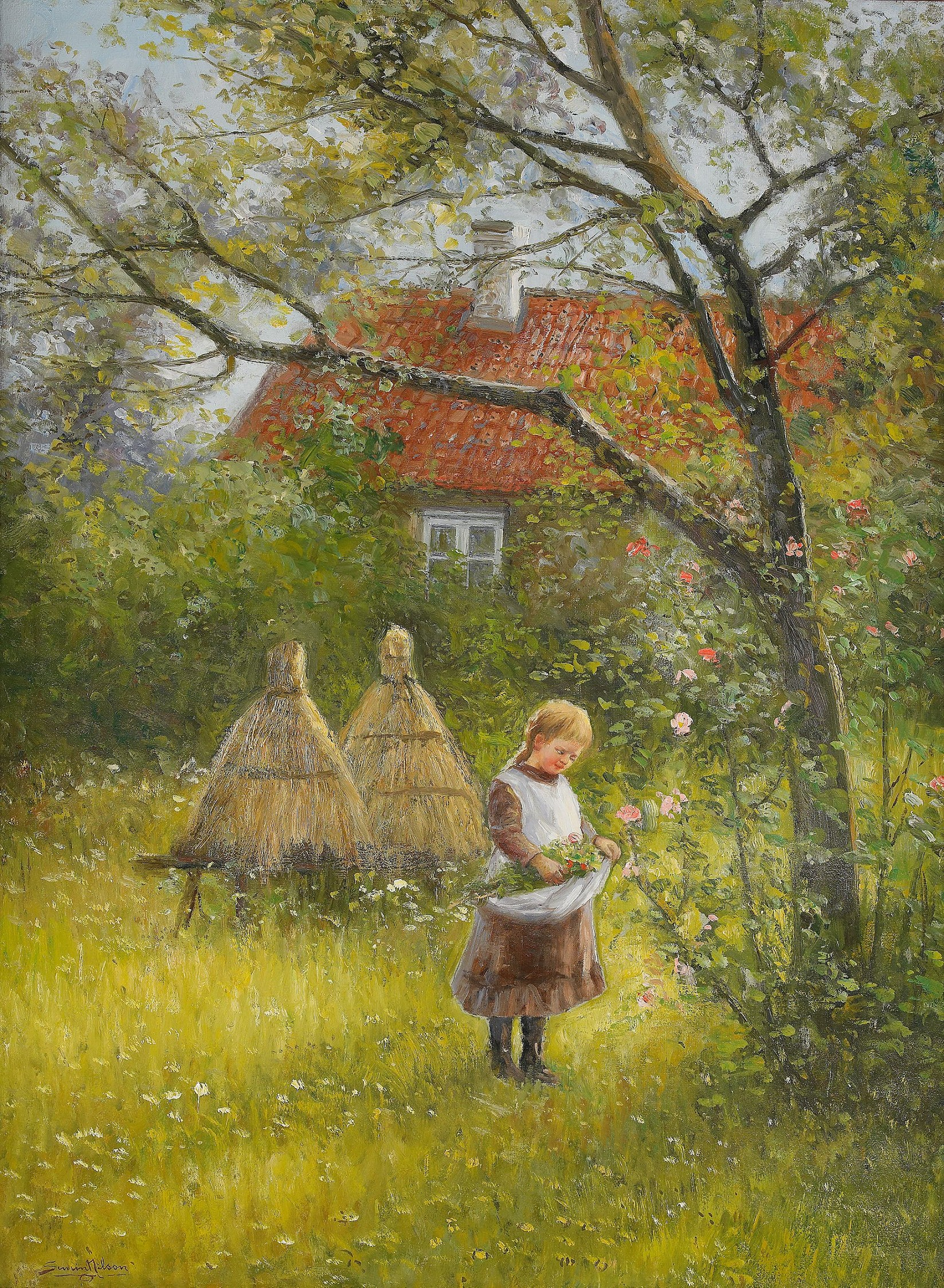
Lillan in the Garden

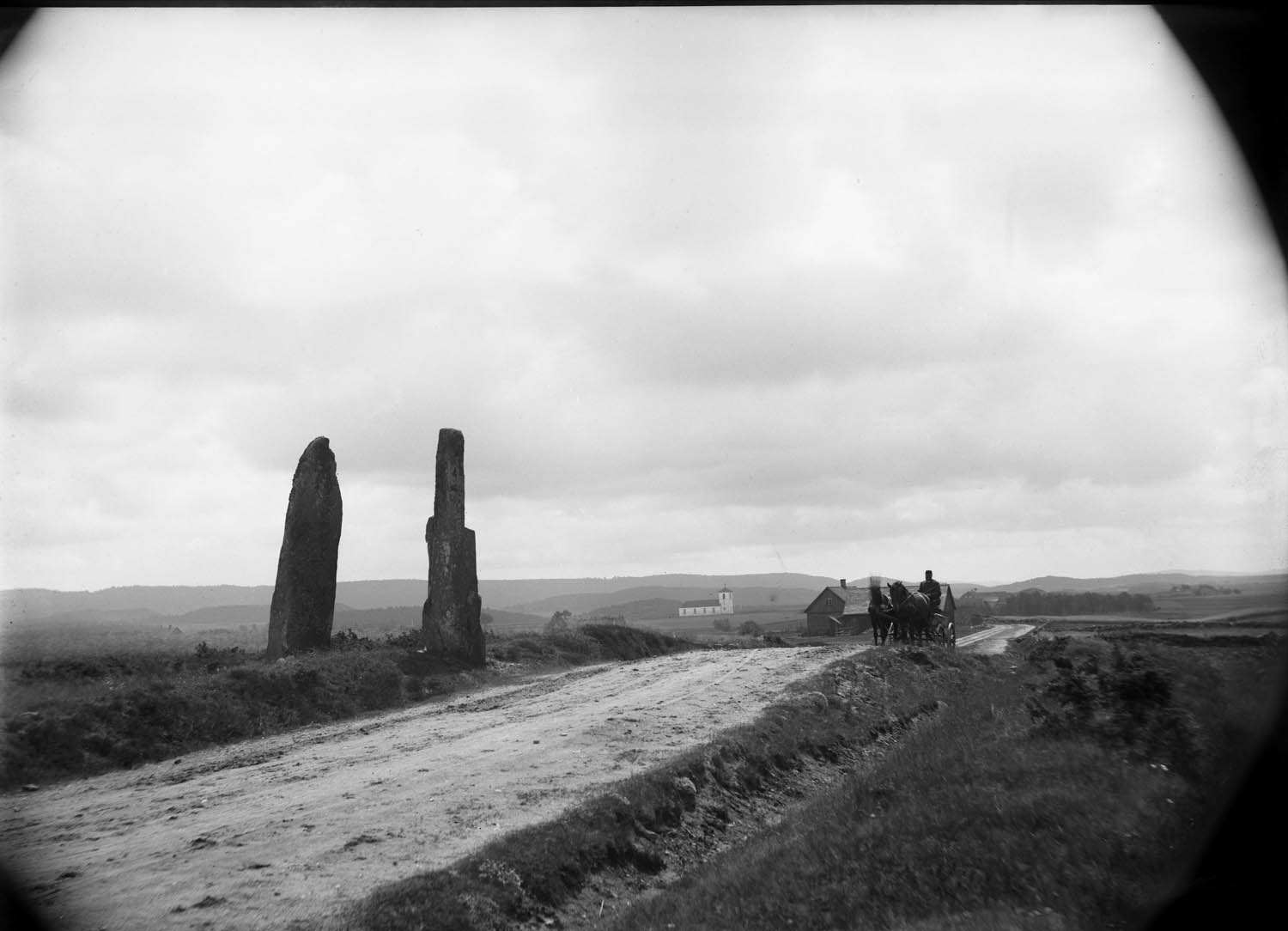
Horse cart in Asige

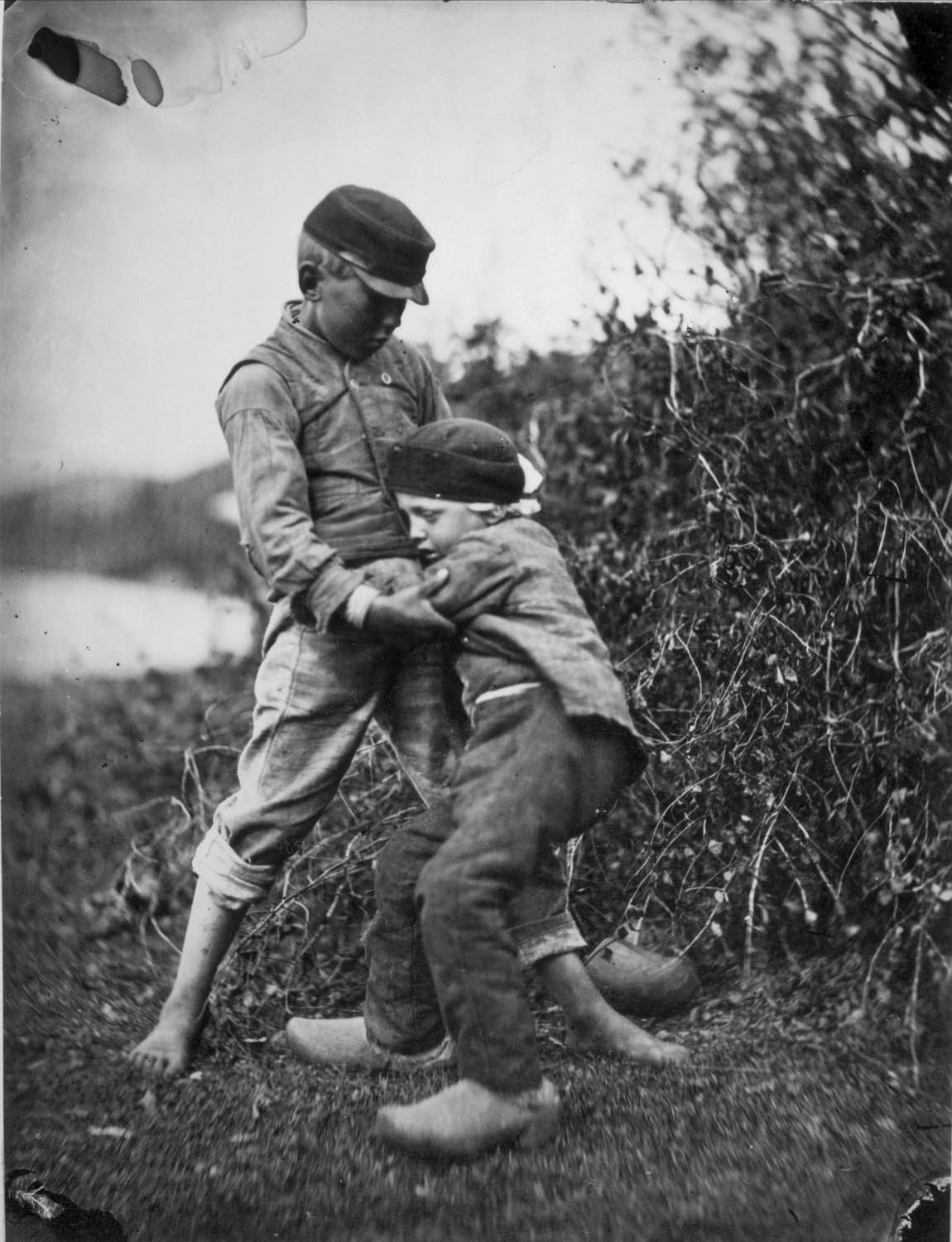
Two brothers fighting

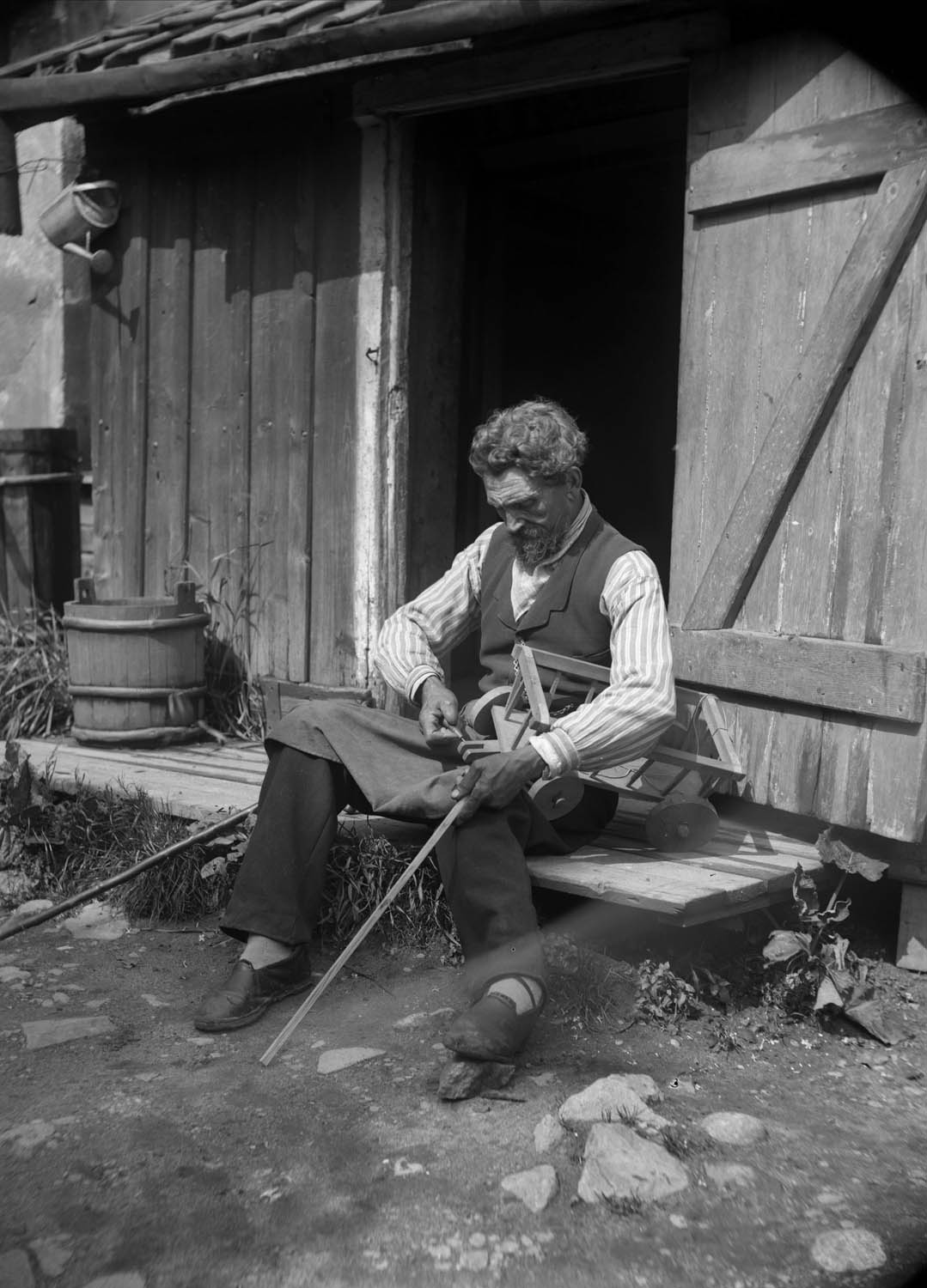
The Toymaker
