= Anders Osterlind =

French painter (1887–1960)

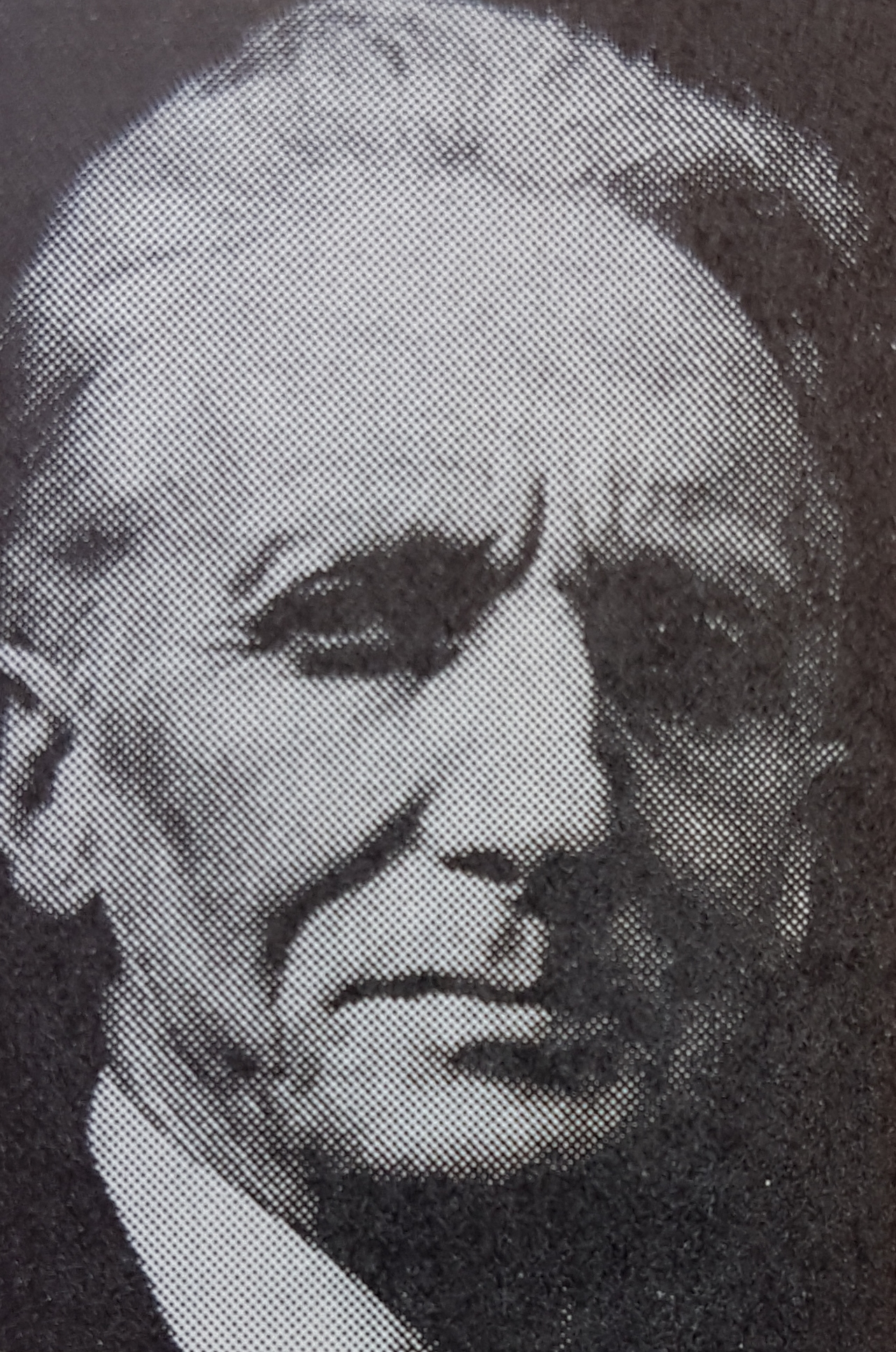
- Born: 19 June 1887; Lépaud, France
- Died: 5 January 1960 (aged 72); Paris, France
- Education: sv:Allan Österlind Per Ekström
- Known for: Painting

Anders Osterlind (19 June 1887 – January 1960) was a French painter. He was the son of the painter Allan Österlind, and the father of watercolorist Nanic Osterlind.

During his youth, Osterlind was close to the impressionist movement, through Armand Guillaume and the aging Auguste Renoir, whom he assisted. He was close to the Fauvism artists at their peak. He also developed mutual friendship and esteem with a number of prominent painters of the School of Paris, such as Amedeo Modigliani, Michel Kikoine, Chaïm Soutine, Othon Friesz, Jacques Villon, André Dunoyer de Segonzac. However, Osterlind showed a fierce sense of independence, an extreme sensitivity to nature, and a dedication to pictural mastery. He pursued, over fifty years, and in a total indifference to trends, a landscape artist's work, original and filled with strong poetic intensity.

== Life ==
=== Youth 1887-1907 ===
Through this period, Anders Osterlind stayed with his parents in Paris, Brittany (Bréhat, Penvern), or the Creuse area (Gargilesse). Whilst in Brittany, amongst his parents' friends, he met with the philosopher Ernest Renan, the art critics Armand Dayot and Charles Le Goffic, the poets Edmond Haraucourt and Max Jacob, the painter Maxime Maufra and in the Creuse area, the poet Maurice Rollinat. In Paris, he got acquainted with the large group of Scandinavian artists living in the capital at the end of the 19th century, in particular August Strindberg, Prince Eugen of Sweden, and the painter Per Ekström. When he was 5 years old, he also met Auguste Renoir, who was living next to his parents at the bottom of Montmartre hill, and who used to take him for long walks in the Luxembourg Gardens. Later in his life, he found back the famous painter in Cagnes in 1918-1919.

He received his primary education along the places of the family's moves, in schools at Penvern, and Bréhat, in Brittany, then in Gargilesse-Dampierre and Fresselines in the Creuse area. His secondary education was completed in Sainte-Croix school in Neuilly-sur-Seine, near Paris. He did not attend any art school or studio. His artistic education was provided by his father, the painter-etcher-watercolorist sv:Allan Österlind, of post romantic and naturalist inclination, and by his French friends Maurice Rollinat, Maxime Maufra, Jean-François Raffaëlli, as well as by the Nordic community he used to get with, and in particular the swede Per Ekström who taught him the art of painting knife which shall become a feature of his work.

In 1905, at the SNBA Paint Fair, Anders Osterlind hung a pastel "L'Aurore" (The Dawn) and an oil painting "Effet de neige" (Snow effect), his first painting which he presented to his master Per Ekström as a gesture of recognition.

=== The maturity (1907-1960) ===
From 1907 onwards, he started selling his work, in particular in Sweden. He moved around in the Montparnasse group, and from 1918-1919, he associated himself with the artist group which was to form the Ecole de Paris : among his friends were Michel Kikoine, Amedeo Modigliani, etc.

Anders Osterlind is primarily a landscape artist. In search of light, emotion, he went to numerous places around France. He also stayed abroad. He got inspired by the Paris area (Versailles, Moret-sur-Loing, Rambouillet forest), Northern Brittany (Penvern, Ploumanac'h, Tonquédec, Bréhat, Lannion, Saint-Quay-Portrieux), Finistère (Bénodet, Portsall), Normandy (Honfleur, Barfleur, Yport, Martagny, etc.), South of France (Arles, Cagnes-sur-Mer, Aix-en-Provence, Vaison-la-Romaine), and also by the Creuse, Corrèze, Sarthe, Touraine, Alps, Lozère (Florac), Cantal (Thiézac), Charente, Pays Basque. He also stayed in Tunisia, Stockholm, and Copenhagen.

Osterlind was a member of the "Salon d'Automne" (the well established Fall exhibition), the Salon des Indépendants, of the board of the "Salon des Tuileries", vice-president of the "Salon du dessin et de la peinture à l'eau". He has left over 2000 paintings, held in private collections and in numerous museums in France and abroad.

== His paintings ==
=== 1907-1926 ===
Getting away, under the influence of the Fauves and cubist artists, from the impressionists and realist trends of the artistic group around of his father, Osterlind asserted, as from his first entry to the Salon of SNBA (Société Nationale des Beaux-Arts), a solid taste for a rich paste, expressing a lyrism which developed over time : paintings of Neuilly-sur-Seine, Colombes, Brittany, Cagnes-sur-Mer. His palette simplified: ochre, fauve and green shades prevail in the Versailles and Creuse areas and the Orne forests landscapes. The artist reached his plain maturity. The critics then set him at the level of Maurice de Vlaminck, whom he is no follower of, but, was like him, drawn to develop a personal and quite original work.

=== The maturity 1926-1940 ===
From 1926, playing audaciously with blacks and whites, Osterlind provided landscapes with silvery lakes and rivers, under large grey skies, which years the critics referred to as the "grey period".

The landscapes of Lozère, Charente and Somme then set out all the shades of green, to the surprise of those critics, who characterized these years as the "green period".

=== The shock of the war 1940-1948 ===
The defeat of France, the death of his son and the surge of the new painting deeply moved the artist, whose work then took a tragic flavour : snow landscapes in Cantal, paintings of the Paris area and Brittany spattered with chrome yellow, ultramarine, carmine, dark descent from the cross under reddish skies, tormented standstills, which disconcerted the lovers of his paintings in the grey and green periods with their soft and strange poetry.

=== Back to peaceful times 1948-1960 ===
He stayed in Brittany, and spent summers in Vexin, and also more in particular in the sunny peace of the countryside near Aix-en-Provence, which he painted with Cézanne in mind. This artist was the only reference whom he acknowledged next to his father, Per Ekström and the Creuse area of his youth. His work ended by large paintings in which warm and cold tones combine in flower bunches with deep substance and landscapes radiant with an appeased inner life.

=== 1960 ===
His death shall be, for artists like Marc Chagall and critics such as René Huyghe, from the Académie française, that of an artist in his time.

== Gallery ==
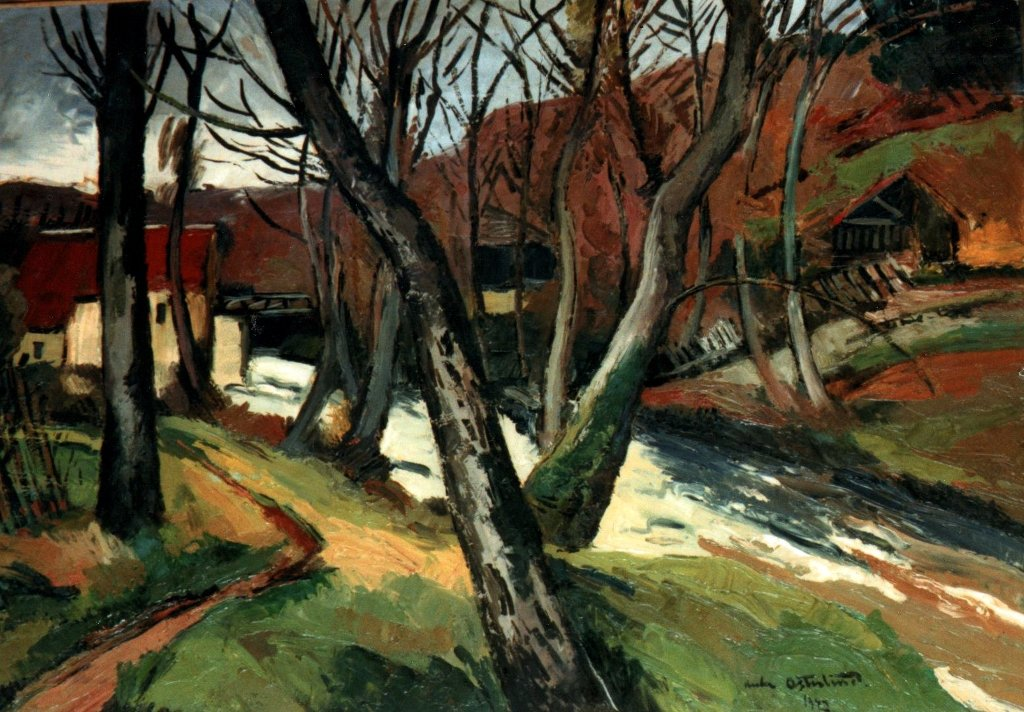
Landscape with a bridge (1922)

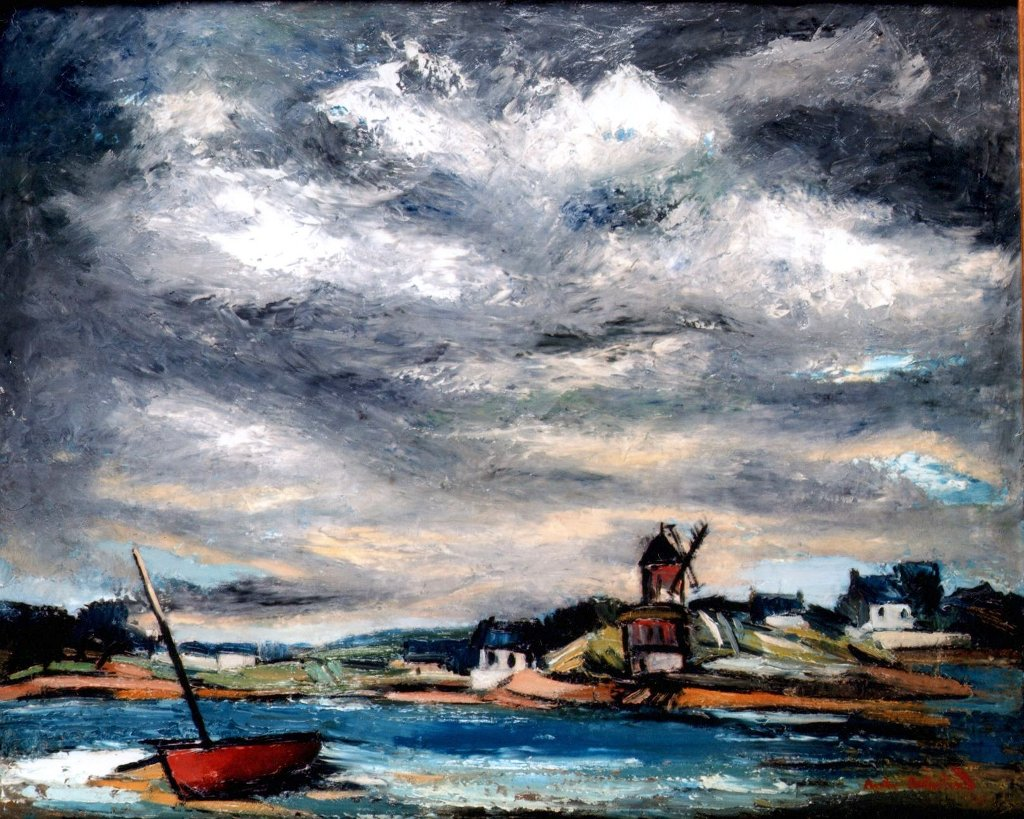
Marine, Bréhat (1927)

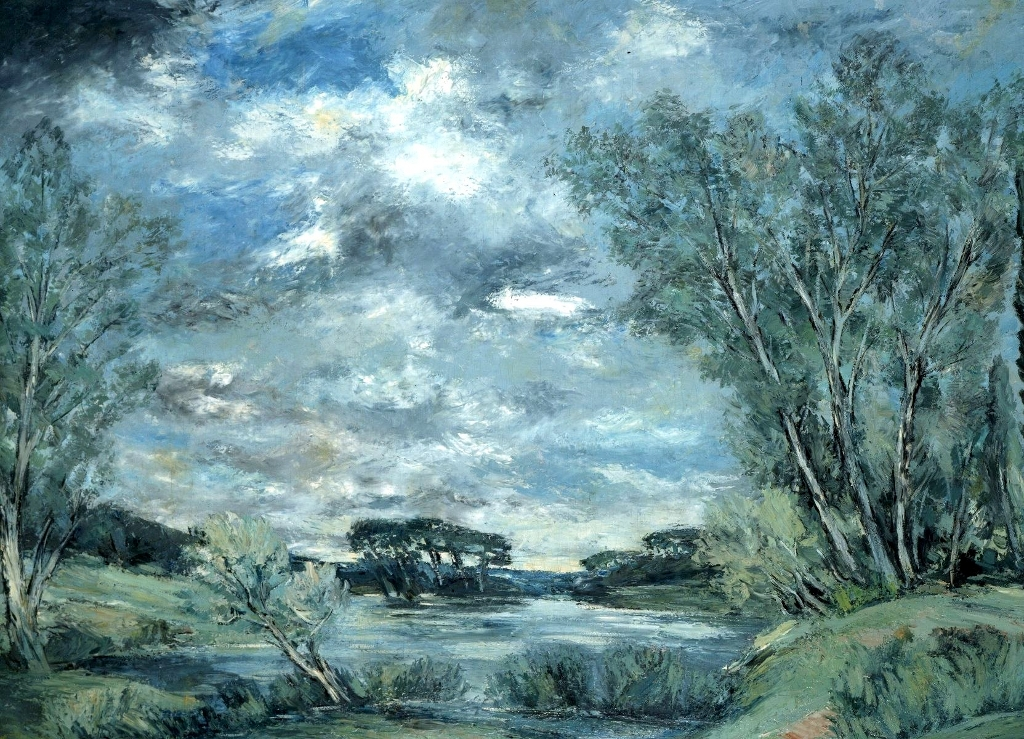
River in a woody landscape (1930)

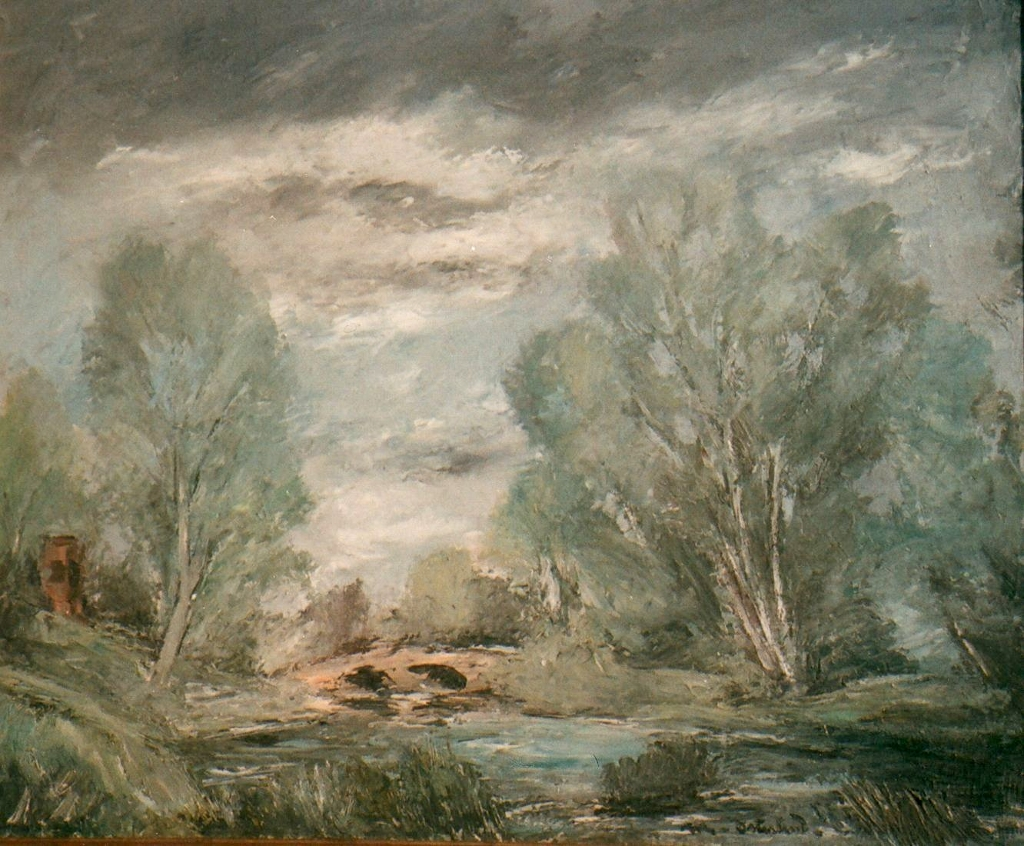
River shore (1932)

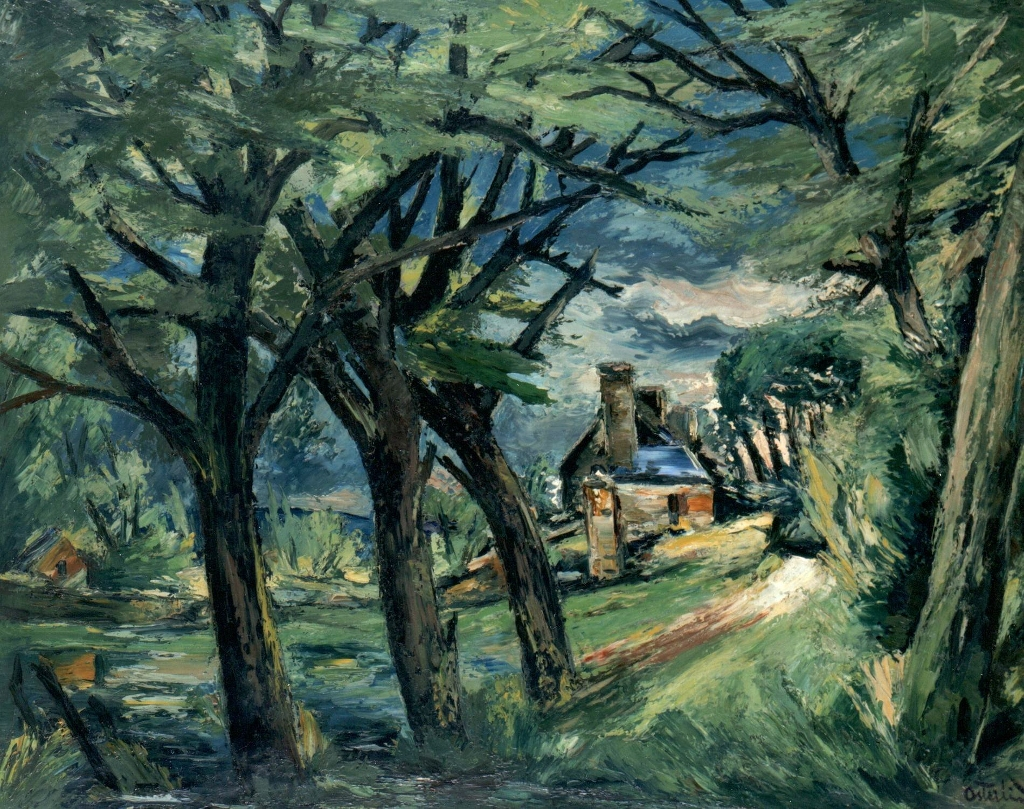
The park (in Touraine) (1942)

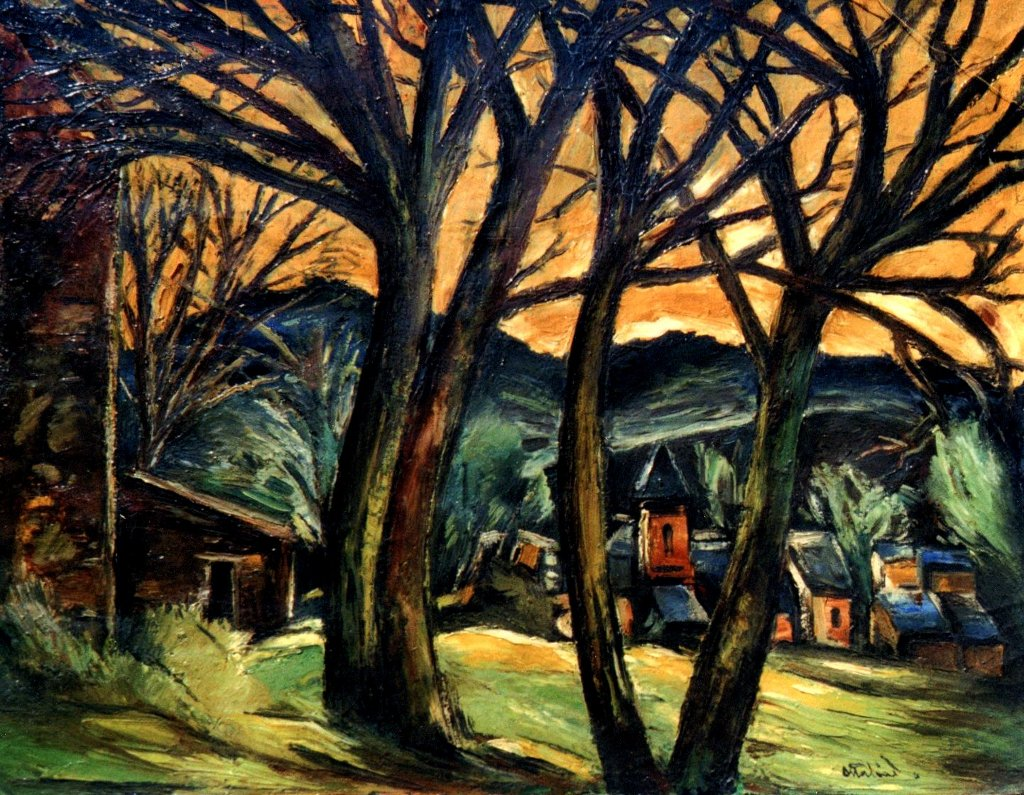
Cantal landscape (1943)

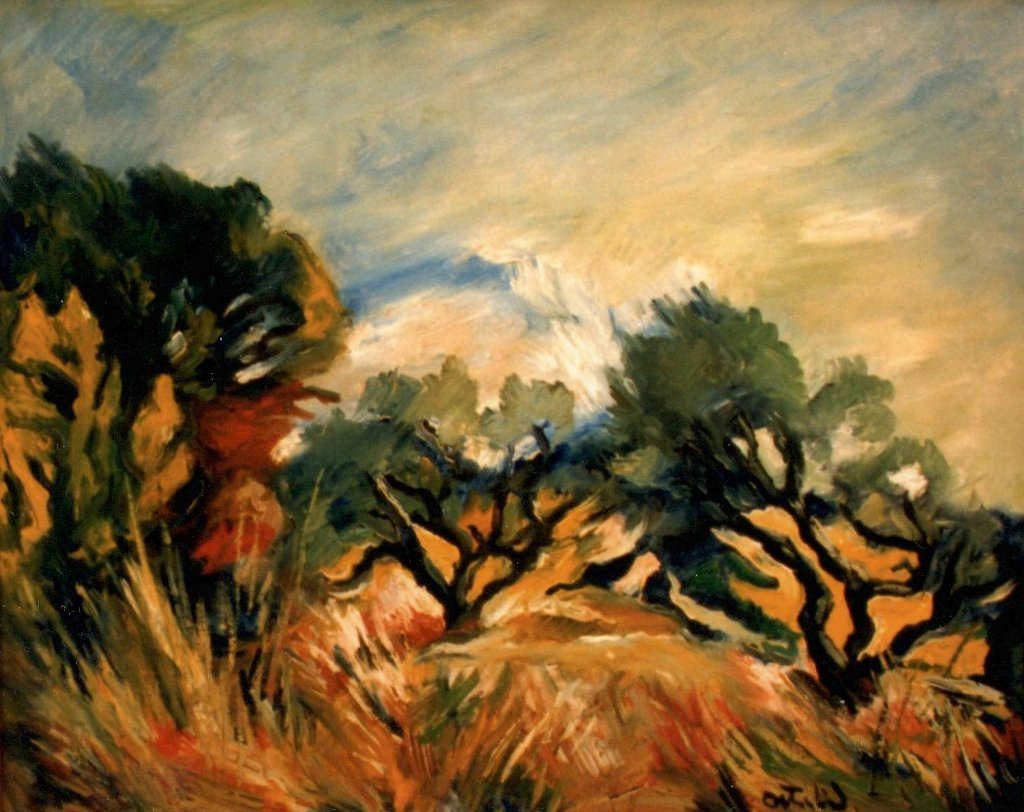
Olive trees in Provence (1953)

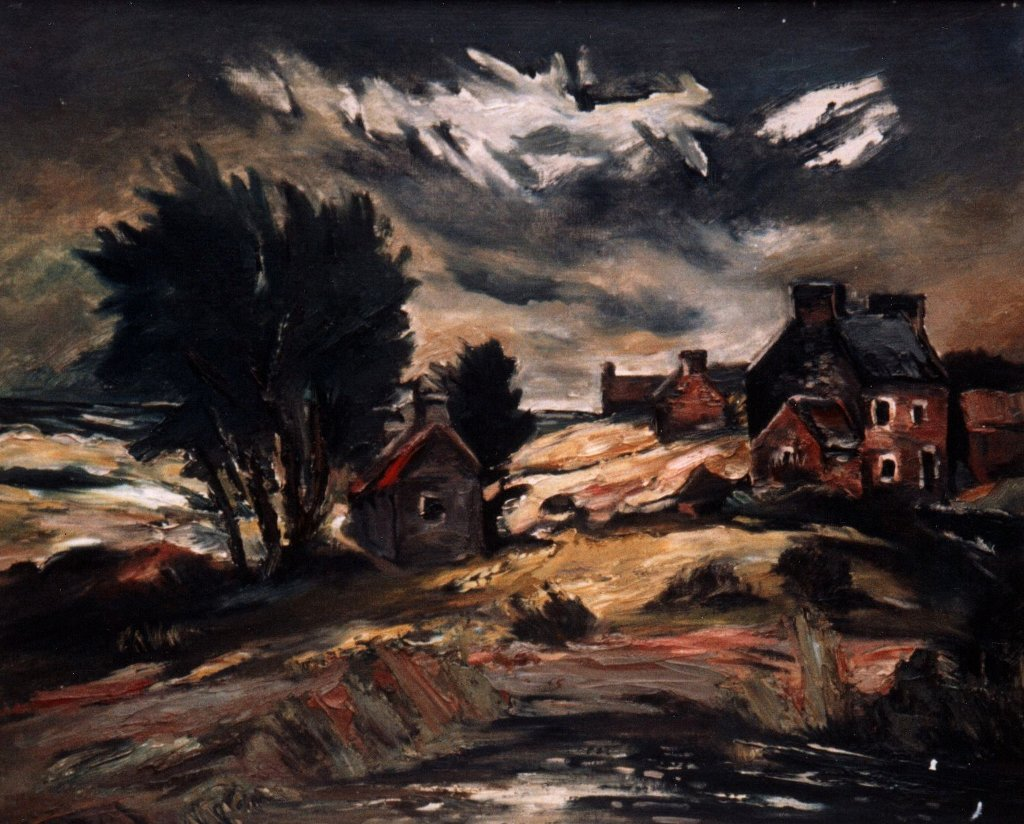
Marine, Porstall

== Museography ==
The paintings of Anders Osterlind are held by a number of private collectors, in France and abroad. Some paintings are kept by foreign museums in the Hague, Rotterdam, Liège, Geneva, Stockholm museums, and in France by the State and Paris Collections at the Musée d'Art Moderne de la Ville de Paris, the Carnavalet Museum, the "Musée d'Île-de-France", the "Musée des Années Trente" in Boulogne-Billancourt, as well as by the Aix-en-Provence, Belfort, Cagnes-sur-Mer, Collioure, Colombes, Guéret, Honfleur, La Châtre, Le Cateau-Cambrésis, Le Havre, Libourne, Limoges, Marseille, Montpellier, Roubaix, Saint-Amand-Montrond, Saint-Quentin, Tours, etc. museums.

== Bibliography ==
- 1926 - Paul Fierens in l'Art et les Artistes
- 1935 - Eddy Mac Farlane in l'Art et l'Industrie
- 1935 - Nesto Jacometti in the Journal des beaux-arts
- 1958 - Georges-Armand Masson in Voyages avec des peintres
- 1968 - Sale catalog Anders Osterlind, Claude Robert
- 1976 - Gérald Schurr in Les petits maîtres de la peinture, valeur de demain
- 1986 - Franck Claustrat Le paysagiste Anders Osterlind et la critique française (Université Sorbonne Paris I, mémoire de DEA)
- 1994 - Franck Claustrat Les artistes suédois en France de 1913 à 1935 (Université Sorbonne Paris I, thèse de doctorat)
- 1995 - Ch Rameix École de Crozant, Souny Publishers
- 1998 - Exhibition catalog Les maîtres de la Creuse, Dun Le Pelestel
- 2000 - Exhibition catalog Anders Osterlind, Musée des beaux-arts de Pont-Aven
- 2003 - J-P Potron Paysages de Cagnes-Antibes, Civetta Publishers
- 2004 - Kerlo-Duroc Peintres des Côtes de Bretagne, de Saint Brieuc à Brest, Chasse Marée Publishers
- 2005 - Exhibition catalog : Les 3 Osterlind à Gargilesse
- 2005 - Exhibition catalog : La Roche-Jagu
- 2005 - Kerlo-Duroc Peintres des Côtes de Bretagne, de Brest au pays bigouden, Chasse Marée Publishers
- 2010 - B. Noël, Chr. Tahan, F. Dombre Saint Céneri-le Gérei, Barbizon des Alpes Mancelles, BVR publishers
- 2011 - D. Lelouche Les peintres de la Bretagne, Palantines publishers
- 2011 - Exhibition catalog Peintres de Cagnes, Antibes, Juan les Pins, Château Musée de Cagnes
