= Ernst Josephson =

Swedish painter and poet (1851–1906)

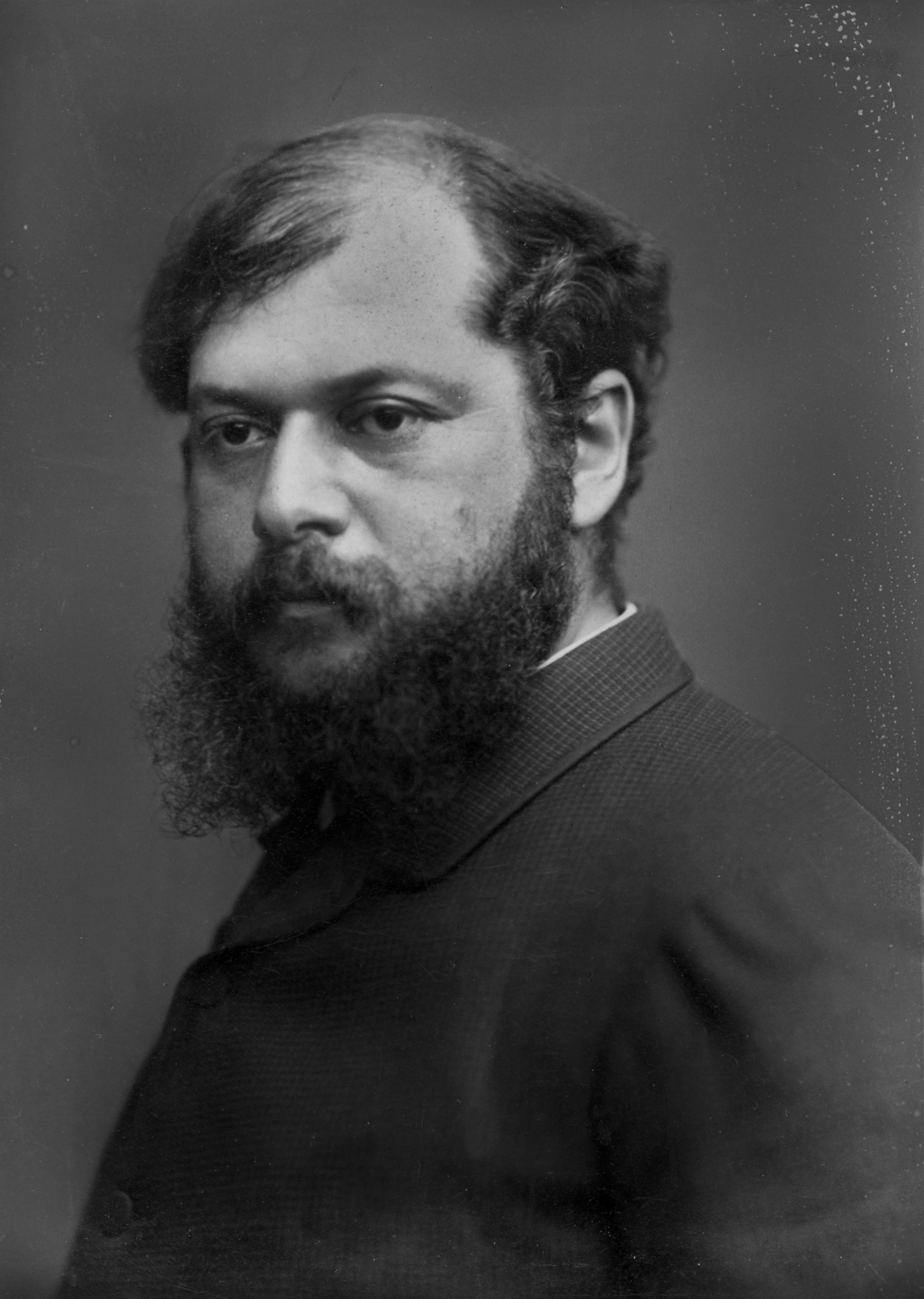
- Born: 16 April 1851; Stockholm, Sweden
- Died: 22 November 1906 (aged 55); Stockholm, Sweden
- Education: Royal Swedish Academy of Arts, Stockholm

Portrait by Louise Catherine Breslau (1886)

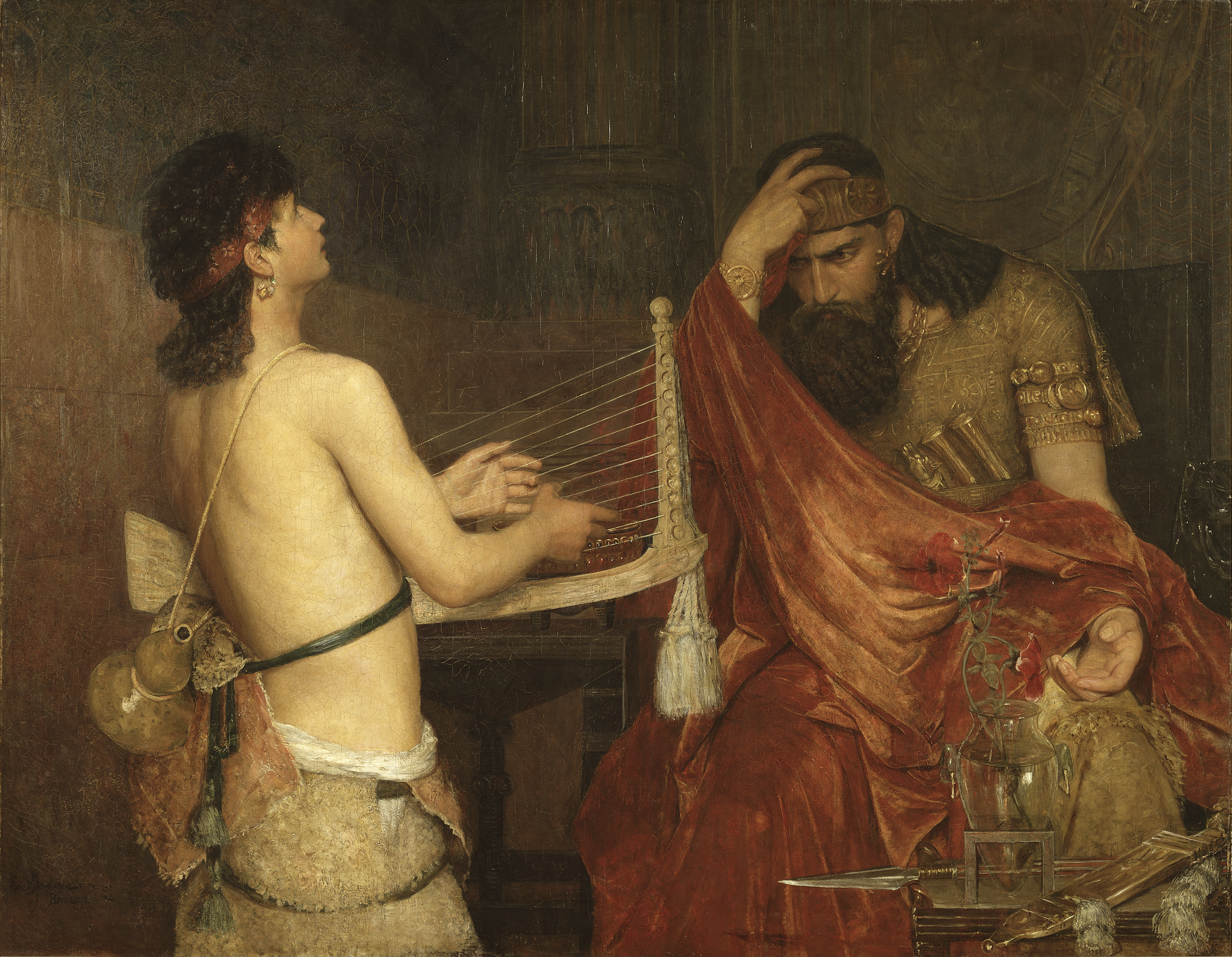
David and Saul (1878) Nationalmuseum

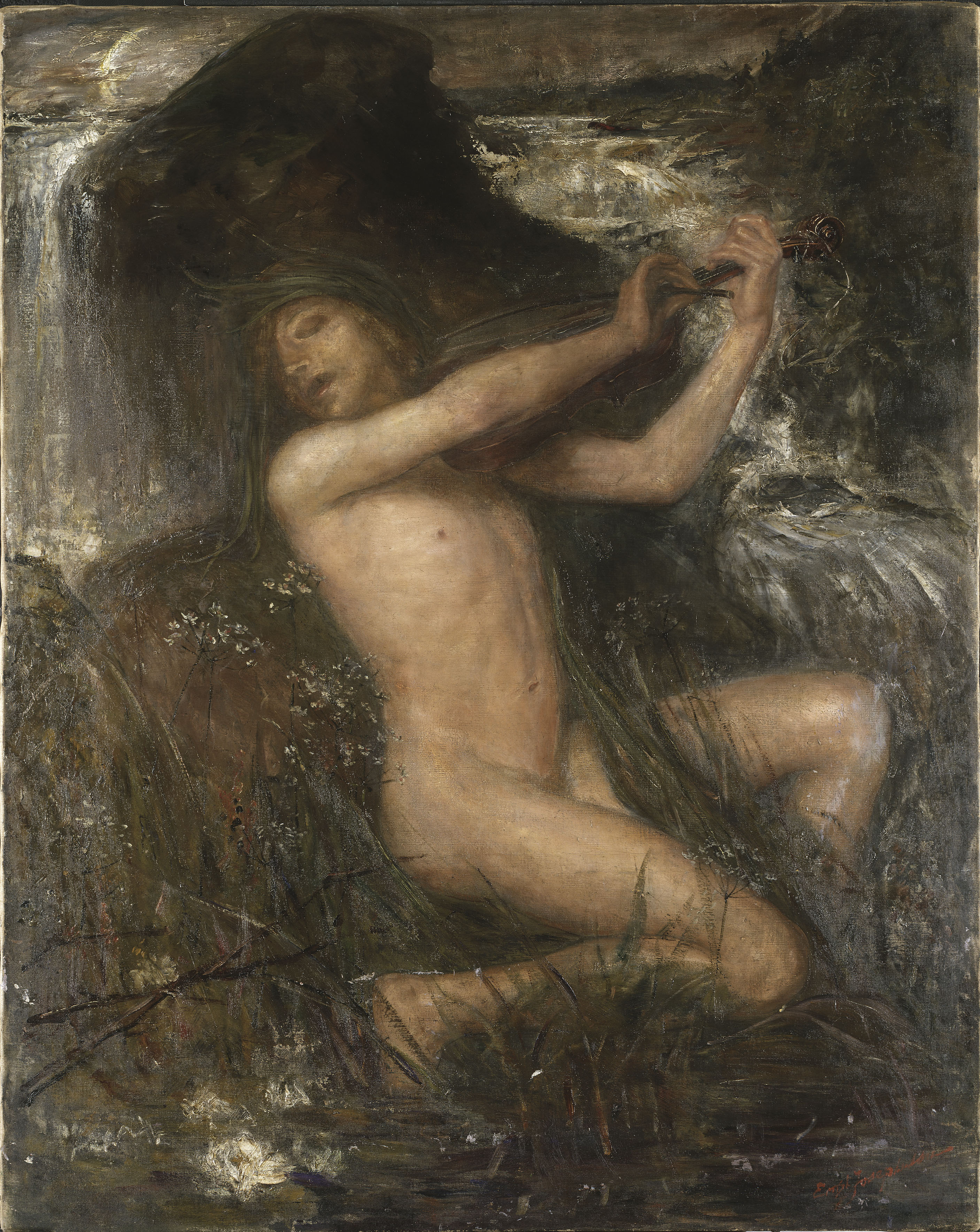
Strömkarlen (1882-1884) Prins Eugens Waldemarsudde

Ernst Abraham Josephson (16 April 1851 – 22 November 1906) was a Swedish painter and poet. He specialized in portraits, genre scenes of folklife and folklore.

== Background ==
He was born to a middle-class family of merchants of Jewish ancestry. His uncle Ludvig Josephson (1832–1899) was a dramatist and his uncle Jacob Axel Josephson (1818–1880) was a composer. When he was ten, his father Ferdinand Semy Ferdinand Josephson (1814–1861) left home and he was raised by his mother, Gustafva Jacobsson (1819–1881) and three older sisters.

== Career ==
With his family's support, Josephson began to pursue art professionally at the age of sixteen, enrolling at the Royal Swedish Academy of Fine Arts. His primary instructors there were Johan Christoffer Boklund and August Malmström. He was there until 1876, when he received a Royal Medal for painting.

After leaving the academy, he and his friend and fellow artist Severin Nilsson (1846–1918) visited Italy, Germany, and the Netherlands, where they studied the works of the Old Masters. A major breakthrough in his artistic career occurred in Paris, where he studied with Jean-Léon Gérôme at the École des Beaux-Arts. He soon began concentrating on portraits, many of which depicted his peers and fellow Swedes in France. For a time, he shared a studio with Hugo Birger (1854–1887). Josephson's artistic style developed further during a trip to Seville with his friend, Anders Zorn, from 1881 to 1882.

Josephson's private life was tumultuous, however; by his late twenties, he was affected by syphilis, his romantic life suffering as a result. Josephson was forced to discontinue pursuing a relationship with young model, Ketty Rindskopf.

In the 1880s, a painting that is now considered one of his masterpieces, Strömkarlen (1882–1884) was rejected by the Nationalmuseum. It was eventually purchased by Prince Eugen (1865–1947), himself a skilled amateur artist and art patron, who displayed the piece at his home, Waldemarsudde on Djurgården, in Stockholm. Waldemarsudde has since become a museum, housing in its collection ten additional oil paintings and a large number of drawings attributed to Josephson.

Josephson was deeply affected by his mother's death in 1881, though had found respite when, in 1883, he had obtained the patronage of Pontus Furstenberg (1827–1902), a wealthy merchant and art collector. In 1885, he became a supporter of the "Opponenterna", a group that was protesting the outmoded teaching methods at the Swedish Academy, but his interest in the group diminished when he failed to win election to their governing board.

By the summer of 1888, he was beginning to suffer delusions and hallucinations, brought on by the progression of his illness. Residing on the Île-de-Bréhat in Brittany, where he had spent the previous summer with painter and engraver Allan Österlind (1855–1938) and his family, he became involved in spiritism, possibly inspired by Österlind's interest in occult phenomena. While in his visionary states, he wrote poems and created paintings that he signed with the names of dead artists. Some of his best known and most influential works were created during this period.

Shortly after, Österlind took him back to Sweden and he was admitted to Ulleråkers sjukhus, a mental institution in Uppsala. He remained there for several months. The diagnosis was paranoia. After being released, he continued to associate with his old friends, who did what they could to help him. His paintings had become rather distorted, but his earlier works were shown at exhibitions in Paris and Berlin, thanks to arrangements made by Richard Bergh and Georg Pauli, and he received several medals for them. As the years progressed, his physical health declined. First he developed rheumatic problems, which prevented him from painting. Then he was diagnosed with diabetes, which was the cause of his death in 1906.

== Legacy ==
A street, "Ernst Josephsons väg" in Södra Ängby is named after him. His works may be seen at the Nationalmuseum, Prins Eugens Waldemarsudde and the Göteborgs konstmuseum.

== Gallery ==
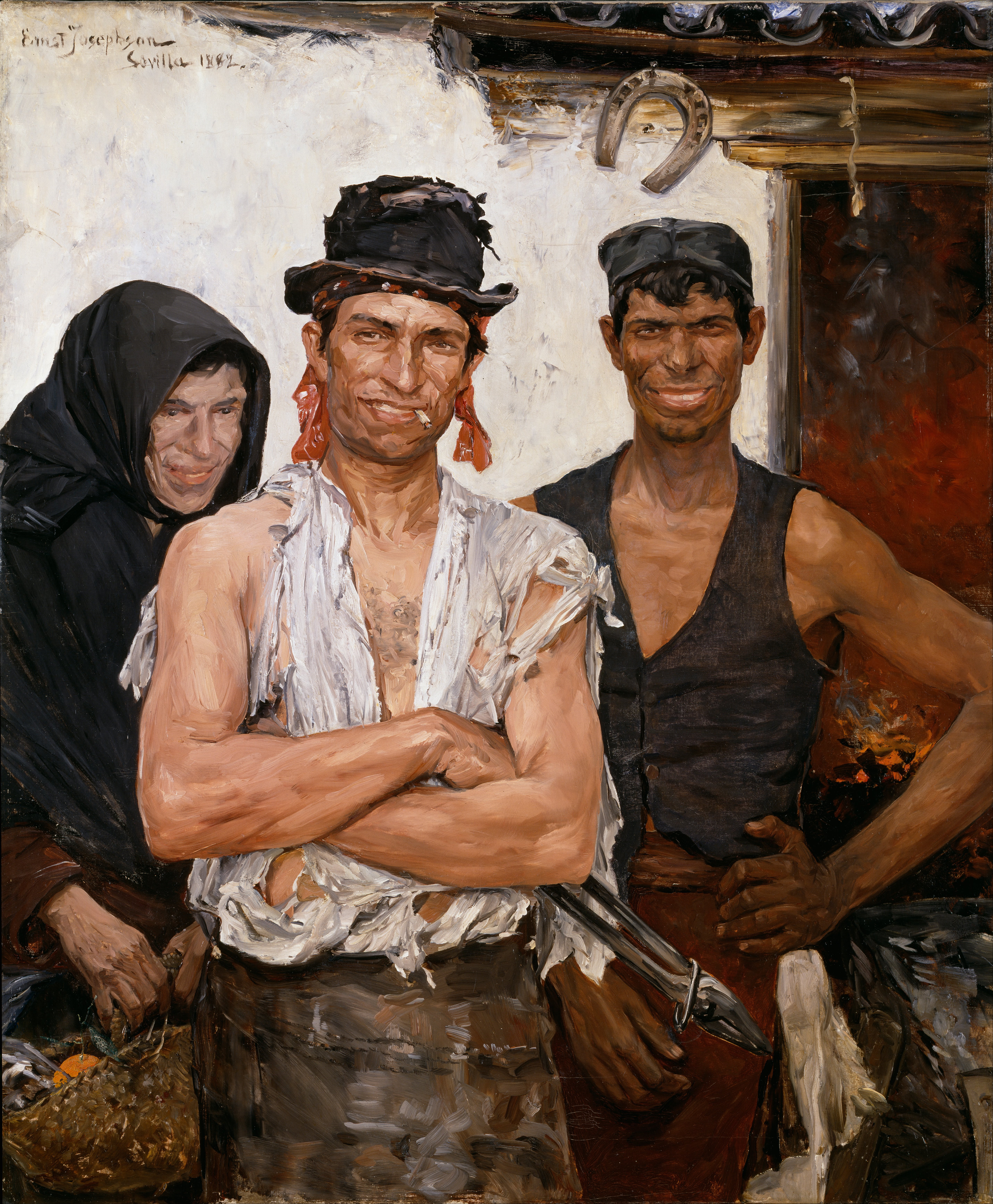
Spanish Blacksmiths (1881)

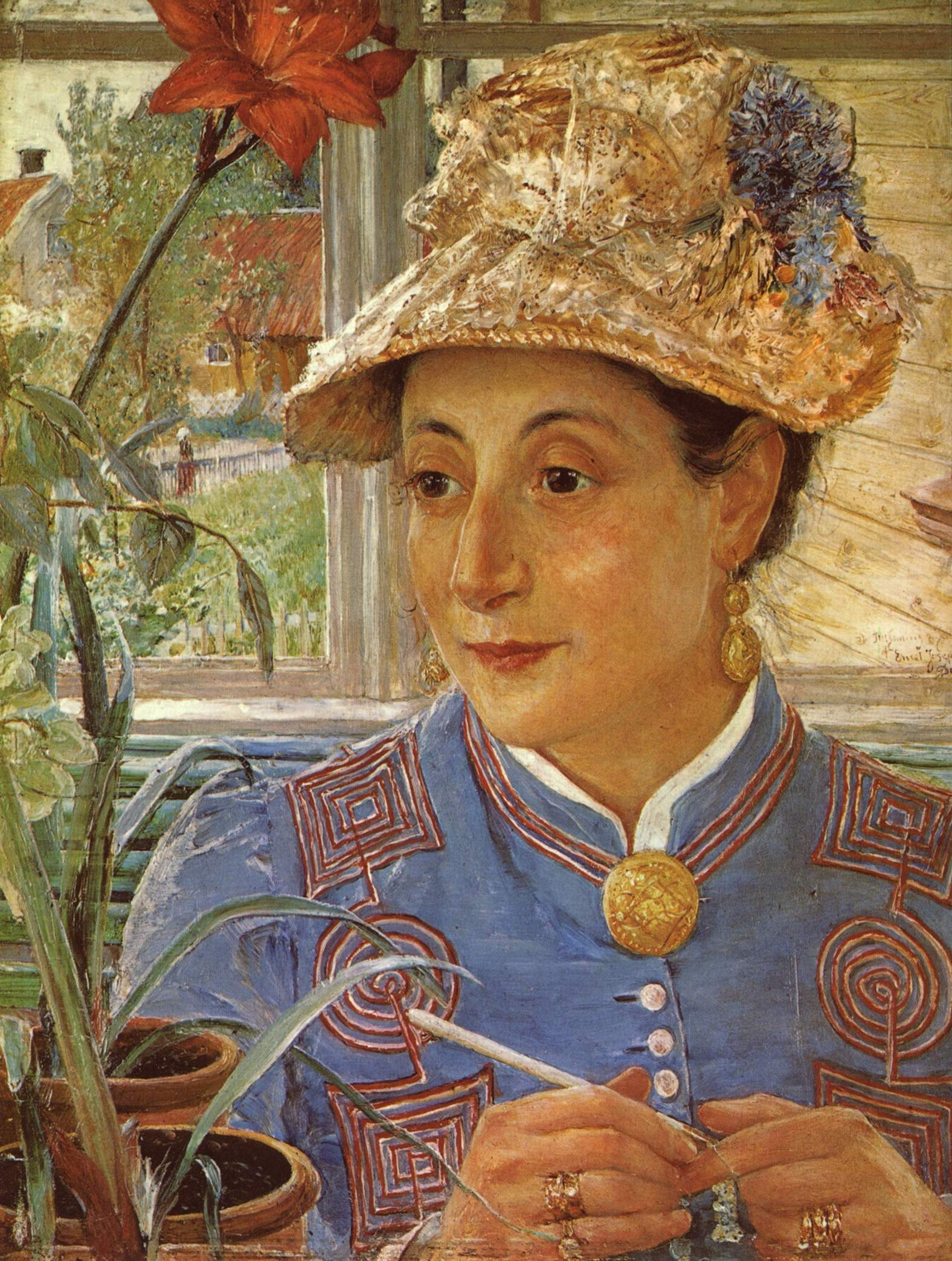
Portrait of Jeanette Rubenson (1883)

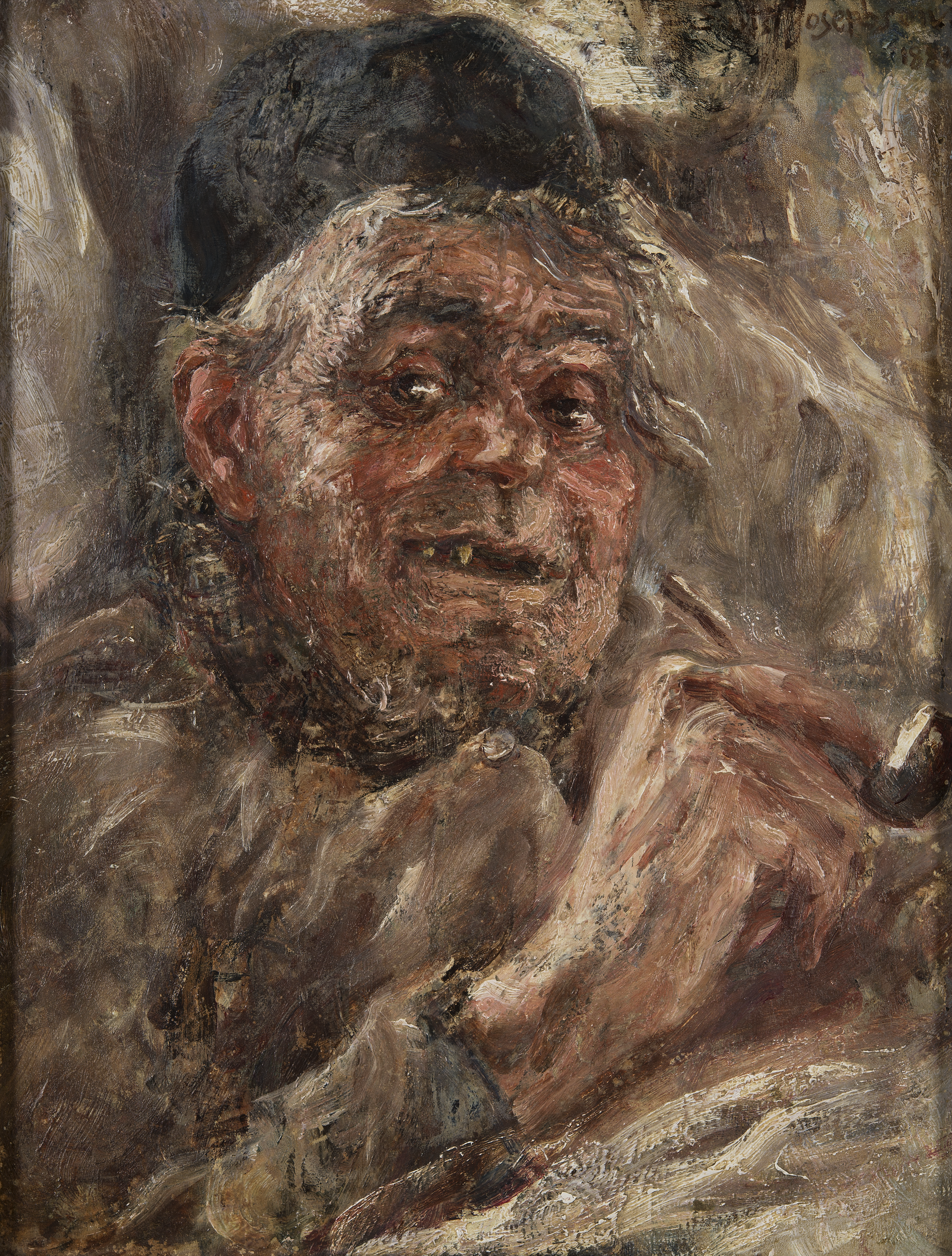
Postmaster of Bréhat (1888)

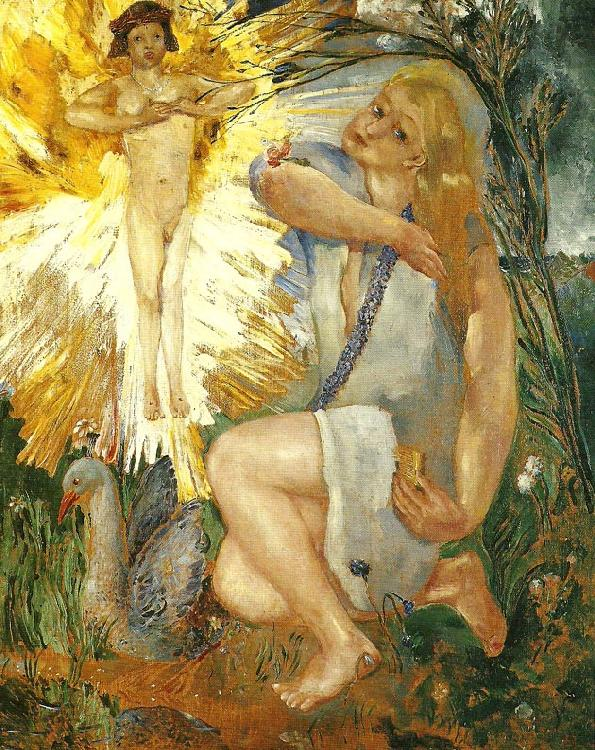
Gåslisa (1888–1890)

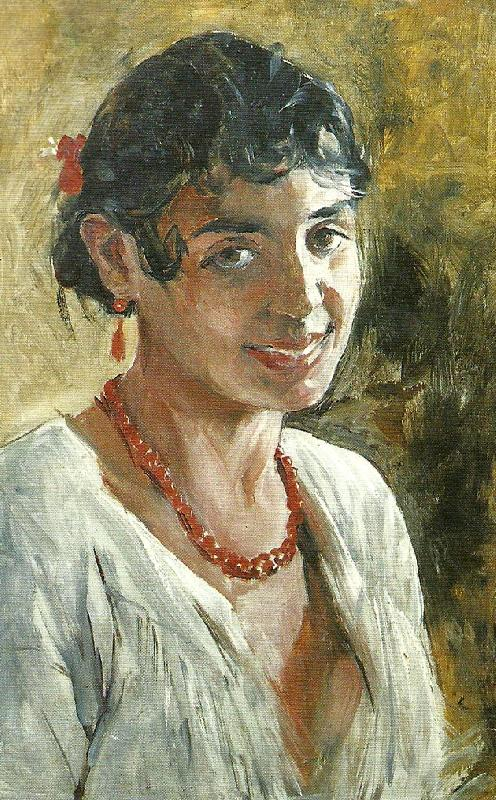
Smile (1890)

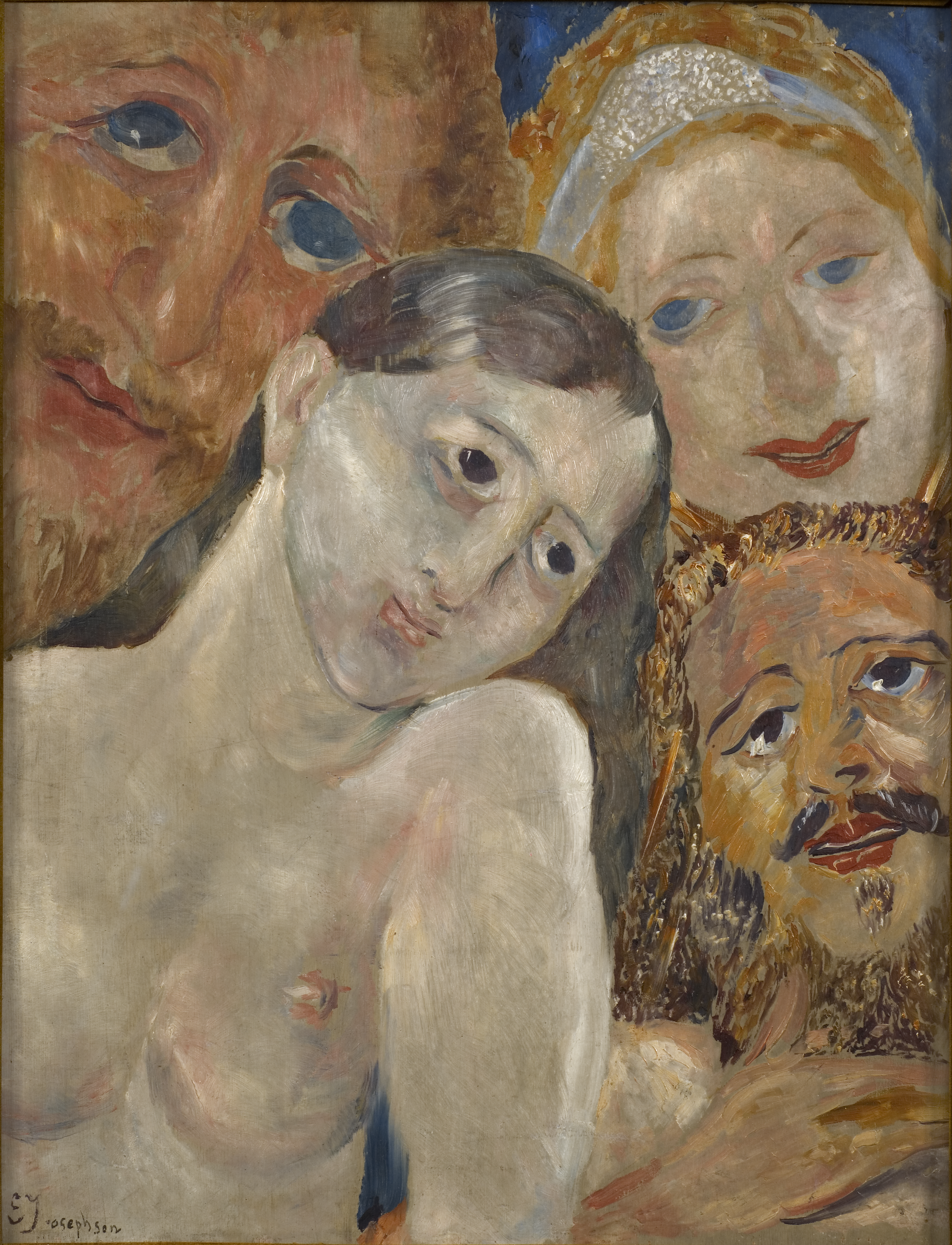
Ecstatic Heads
(after 1890)
