= Per Ekström =

Swedish landscape painter

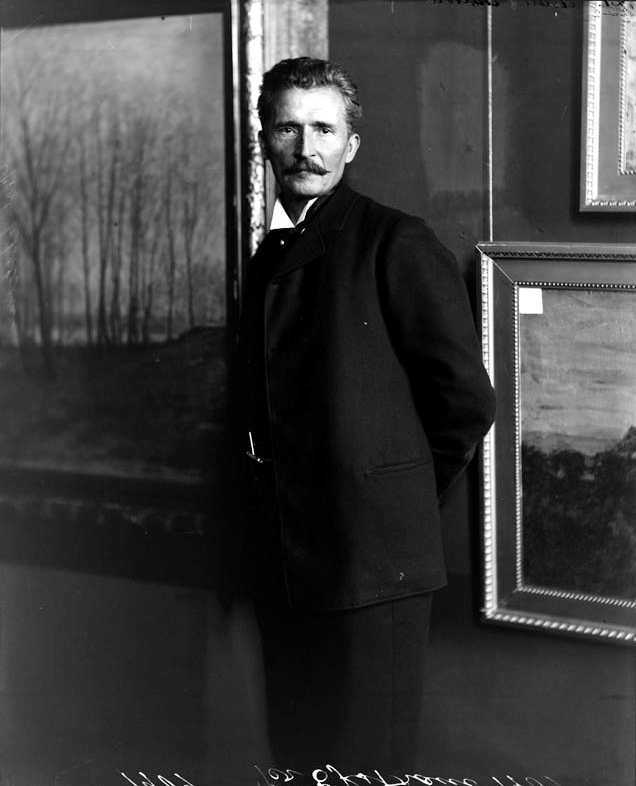
- Ekström in 1909
- Born: 23 February 1844; Segerstad Parish, Öland, Sweden
- Died: 21 January 1935 (aged 90); Mörbylånga, Öland, Sweden
- Education: Royal Swedish Academy of Arts
- Known for: Painting

Signature
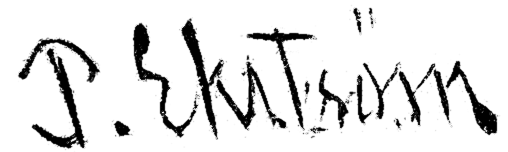

Per Ekström, also Pehr or Peter (23 February 1844 – 21 January 1935) was a Swedish landscape painter, known for his atmospheric scenes with sunsets, in barren or deserted places.

== Biography ==
Ekström was born in the small village Segerstad in the south easts part of the island Öland in Sweden. His father was a house painter. He took drawing lessons as a child, then studied at the Royal Swedish Academy of Fine Arts from 1865 to 1872, but was influenced by French painting rather than the prevailing Düsseldorf School. In 1876, thanks to the support of King Oscar II, he was able to go to Paris, where he lived until 1890. There, he came under the influence of the Barbizon School and Camille Corot. His first exhibit at the Salon was in 1878 and he won a gold medal at the Exposition Universelle (1889).

After returning to Sweden, he lived in Öland, then Stockholm. On the advice of art collector and merchant Pontus Fürstenberg who was a major patron of the arts, he settled in Gothenburg in 1891. He continued, however, to visit Öland every summer and opened a studio in Birger Jarls Bazar, one of Stockholm's first modern office buildings. As the 1890s progressed, he began to work in a style known as mood impressionism (stämningsimpressionism). His favorite places for painting were Stockholms ström and Jämtland. His home was a meeting place for the local cultural and academic world; including the writer, August Bondeson and the painters, Georg and Hanna Pauli.

He also seems to have slowly become rather blasé regarding his work. In the Artists' Association (Konstnärsförbundet), he was known as "Pekström" and, under criticism from Karl Nordström and Nils Kreuger, his standing there diminished. His submission for the Exposition Universelle (1900) was rejected by the jury.

He served as inspiration for the painter, Sellén; a character in The Red Room by August Strindberg. The largest collection of his works may be seen at the Nationalmuseum, the Göteborgs konstmuseum and Prins Eugens Waldemarsudde.

A street in Södra Ängby (Per Ekströms väg") is named after him. Until 2012, there was a privately owned Per Ekström Museum in the Kalmar Art Museum. The following year, it was moved into the old Orrefors glassworks building and expanded to include other artists. The Per Ekström Society (Per Olof Ekströmsällskapet) was founded in 2016 and chaired by the art historian, Ulf Abel.

== Personal life ==
In 1904, he married Hanna Petronella Salomonsson, the daughter of a farmer in Alvesta. In 1910, they moved to the island of Öland. He died in 1935 in the small town Mörbylånga on Öland.

== Gallery ==
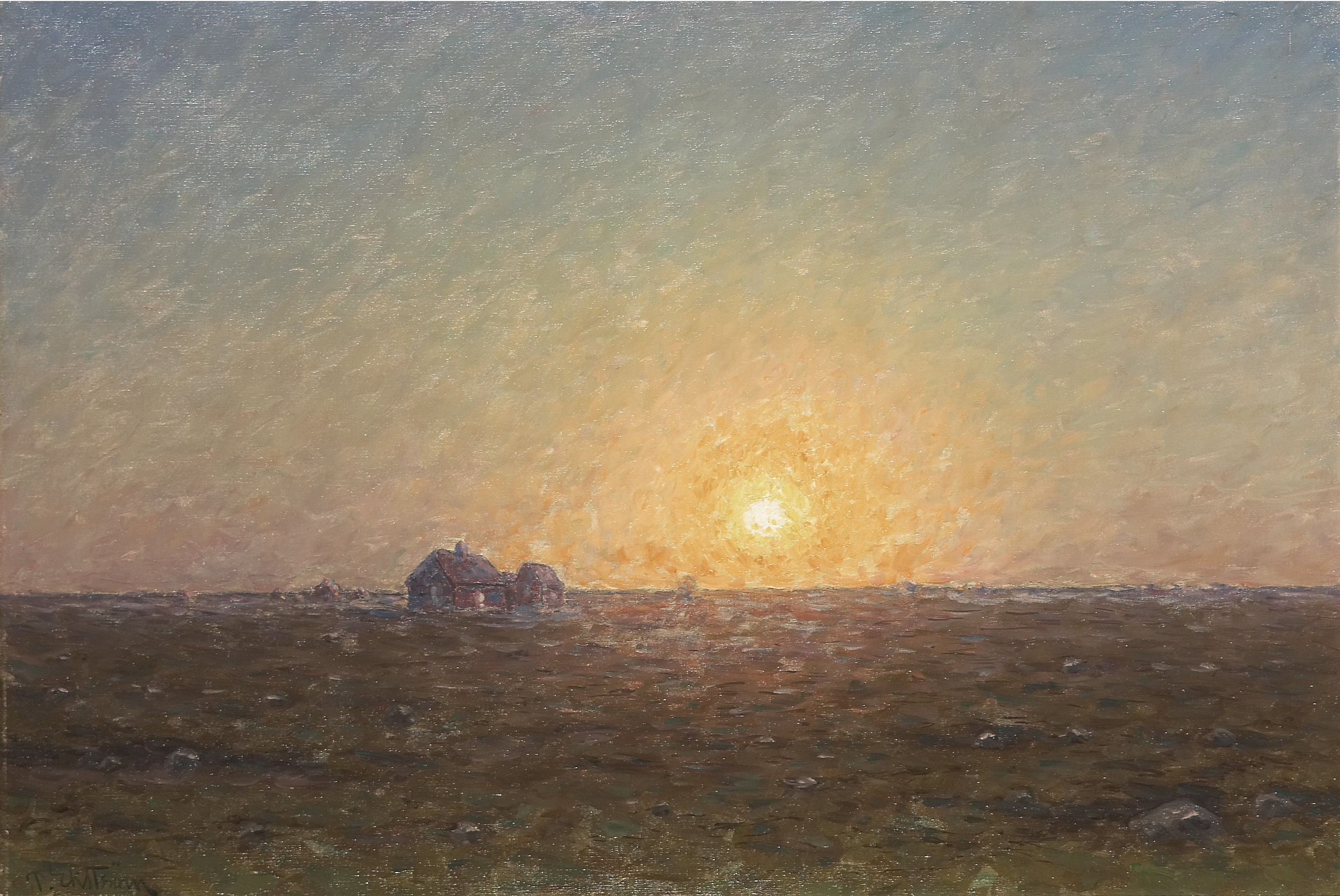
Sunset in Öland

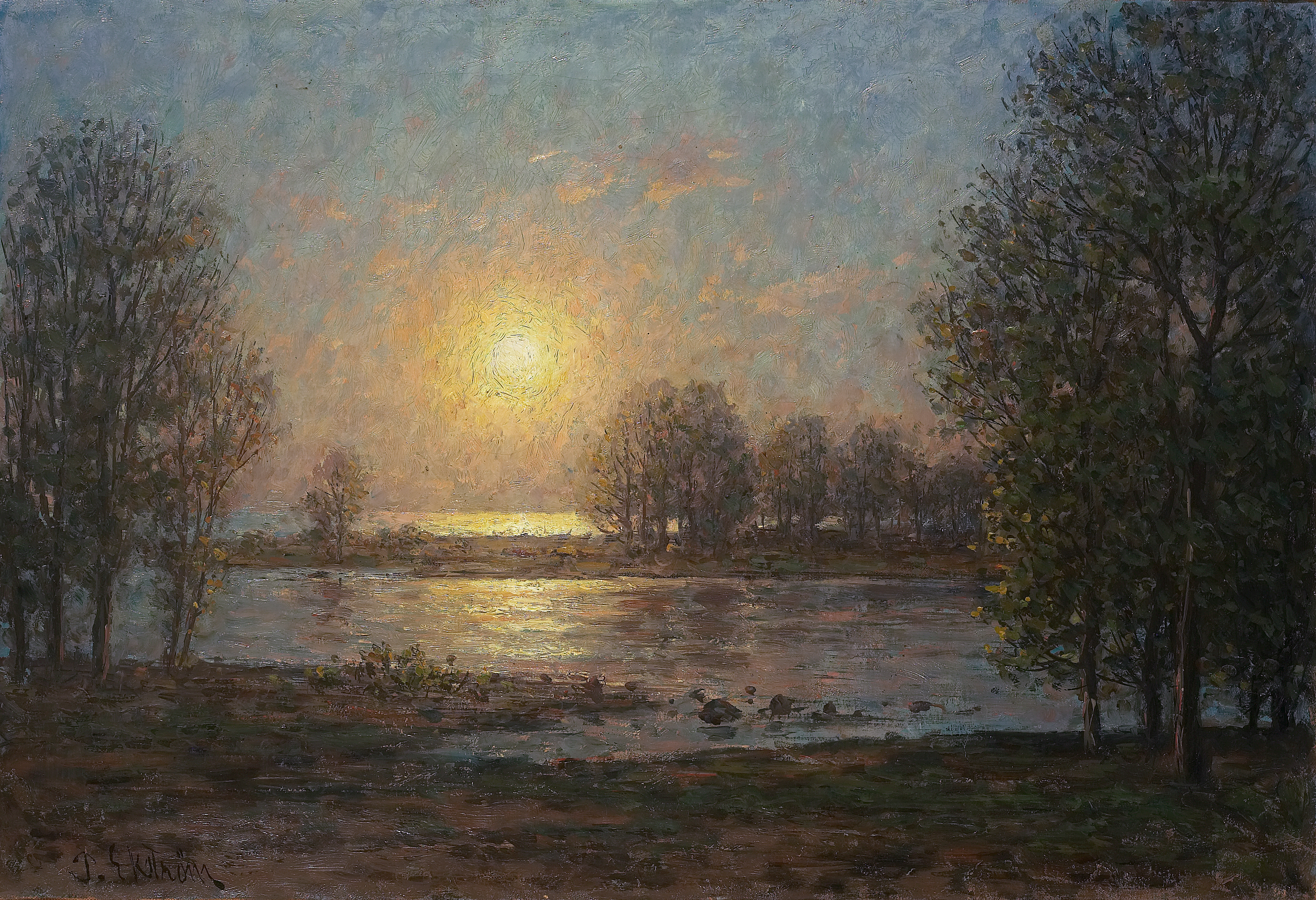
Sunset

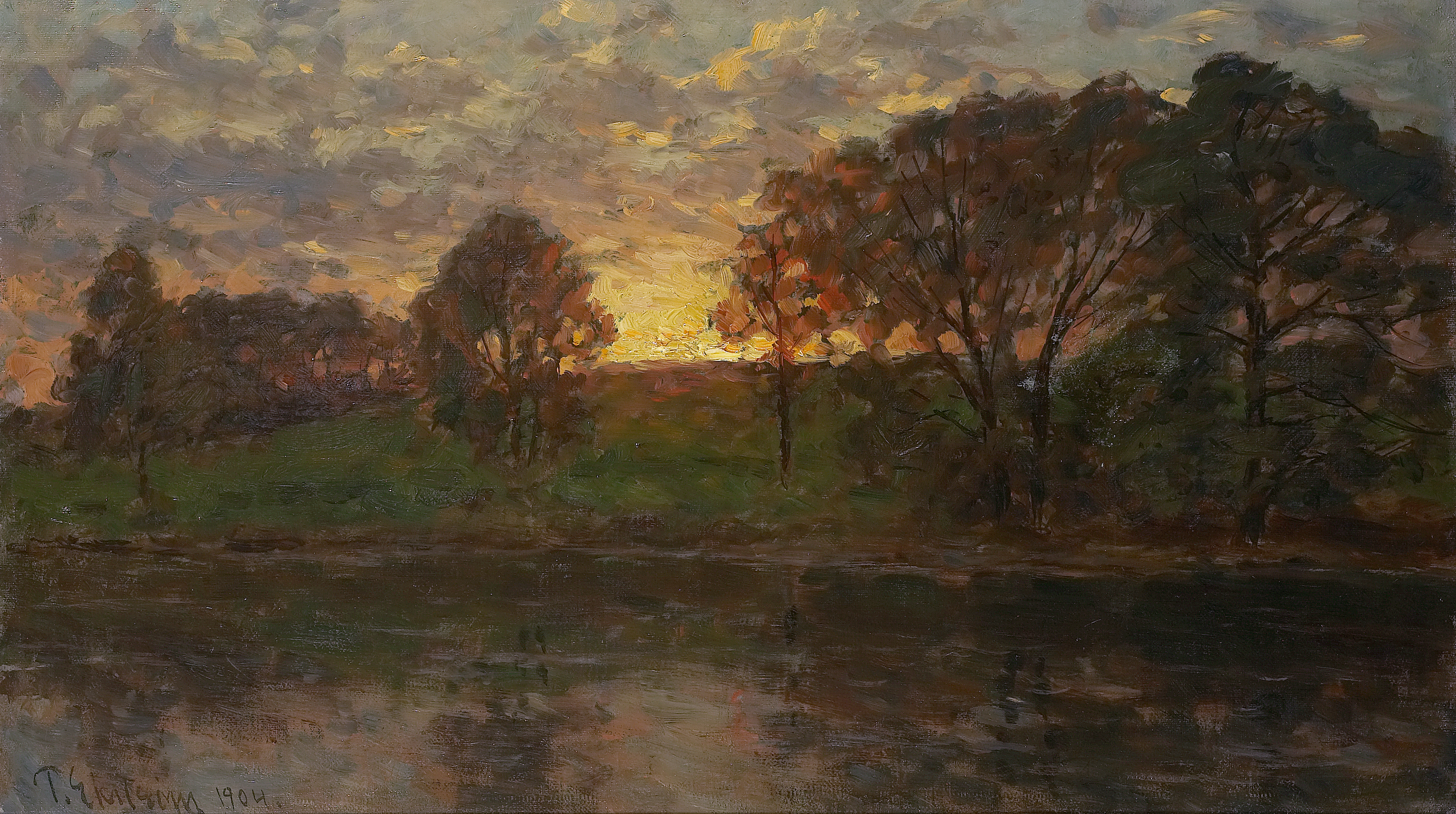
Sunset (1904)

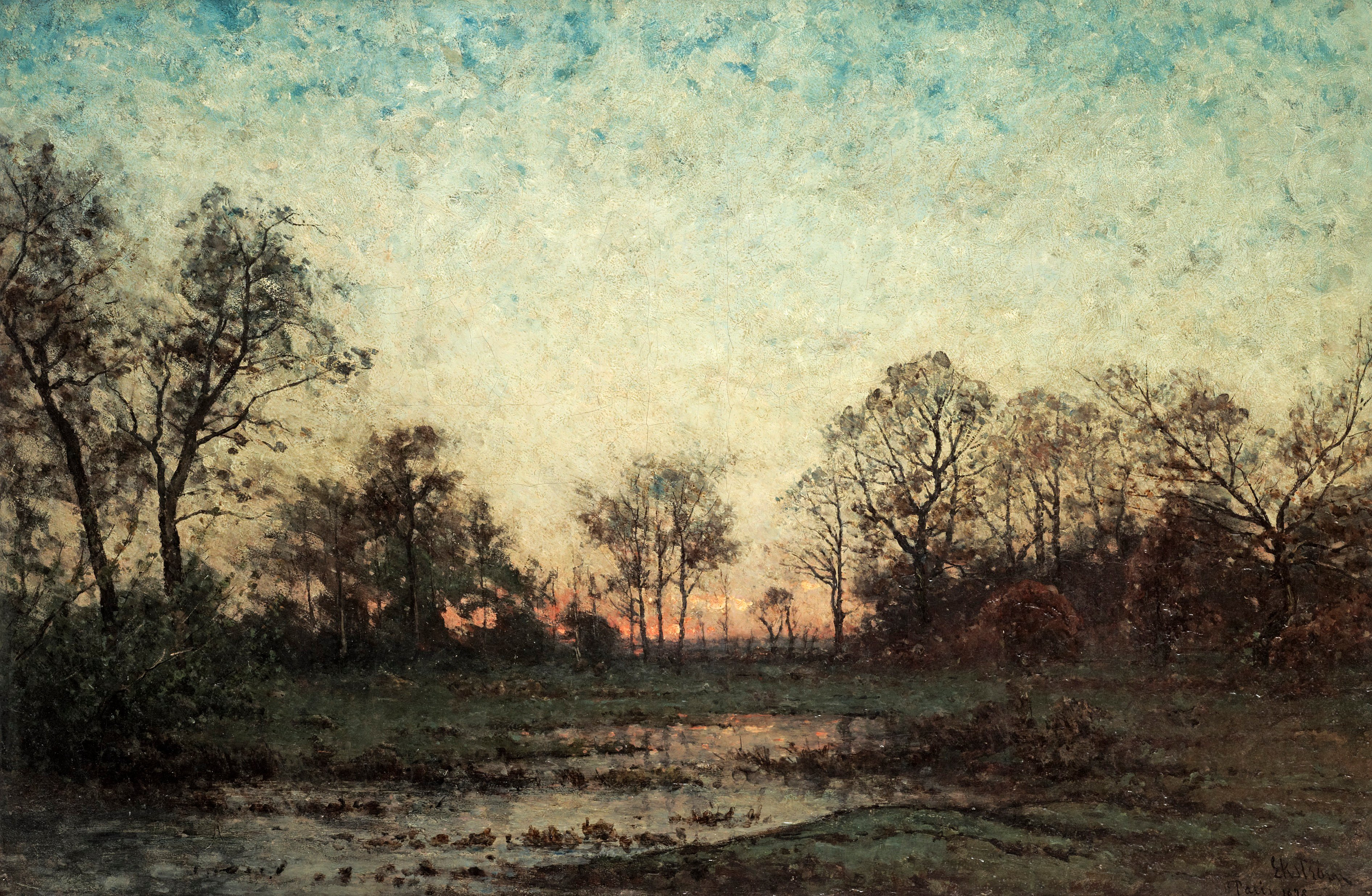
French landscape (1878)

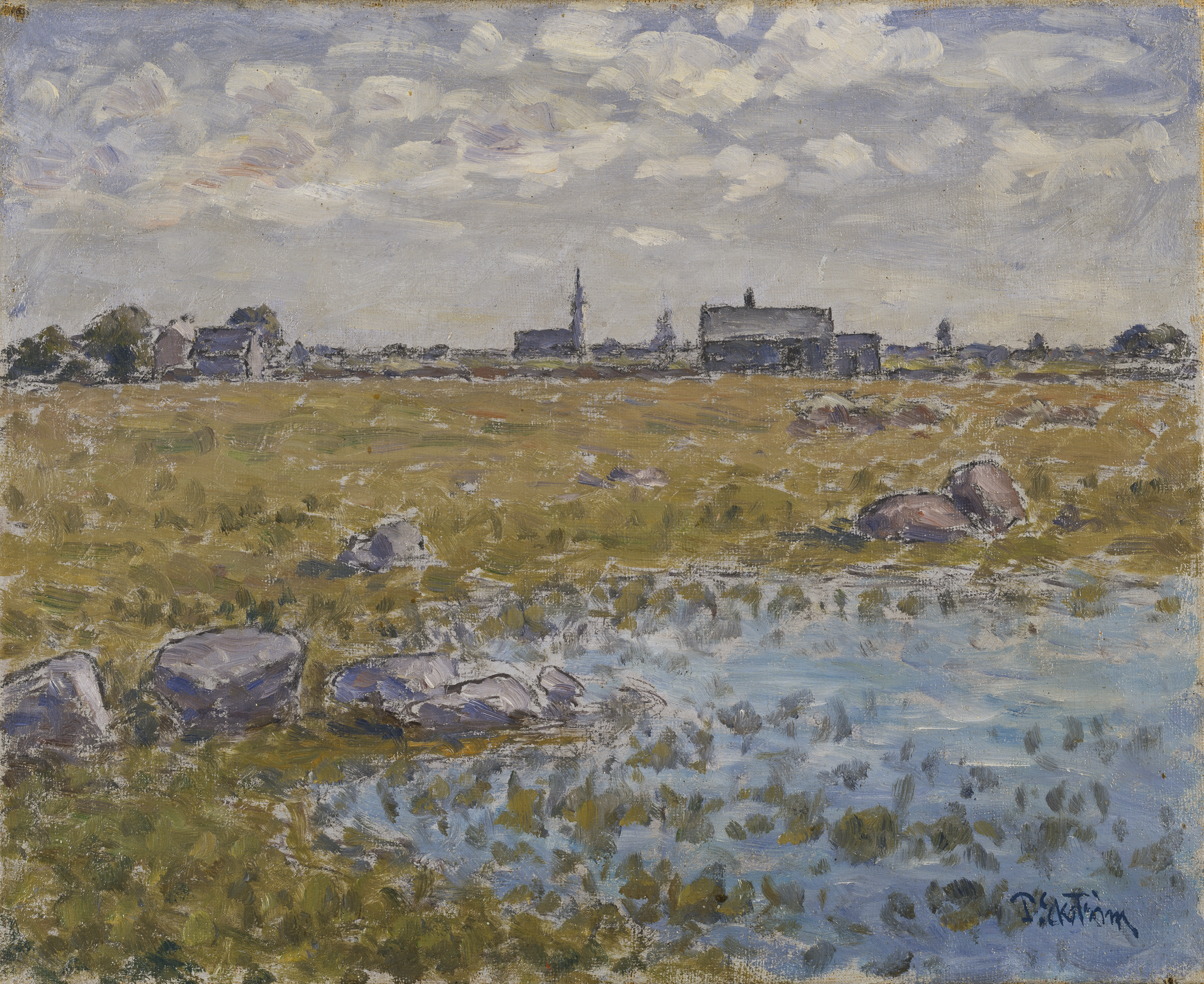
Gräsgård Church (1922)
