= Allan Österlind =

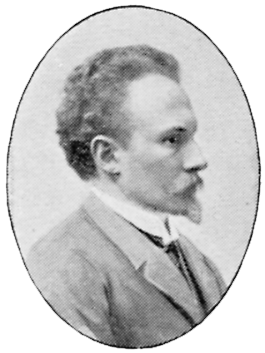
Emil Österlind, from the Svenskt Porträttgalleri XX

Erik Allan August Österlind (2 November 1855, Stockholm – 23 June 1938, Juvisy-sur-Orge) was a Swedish painter and engraver who spent most of his life in France.

== Biography ==
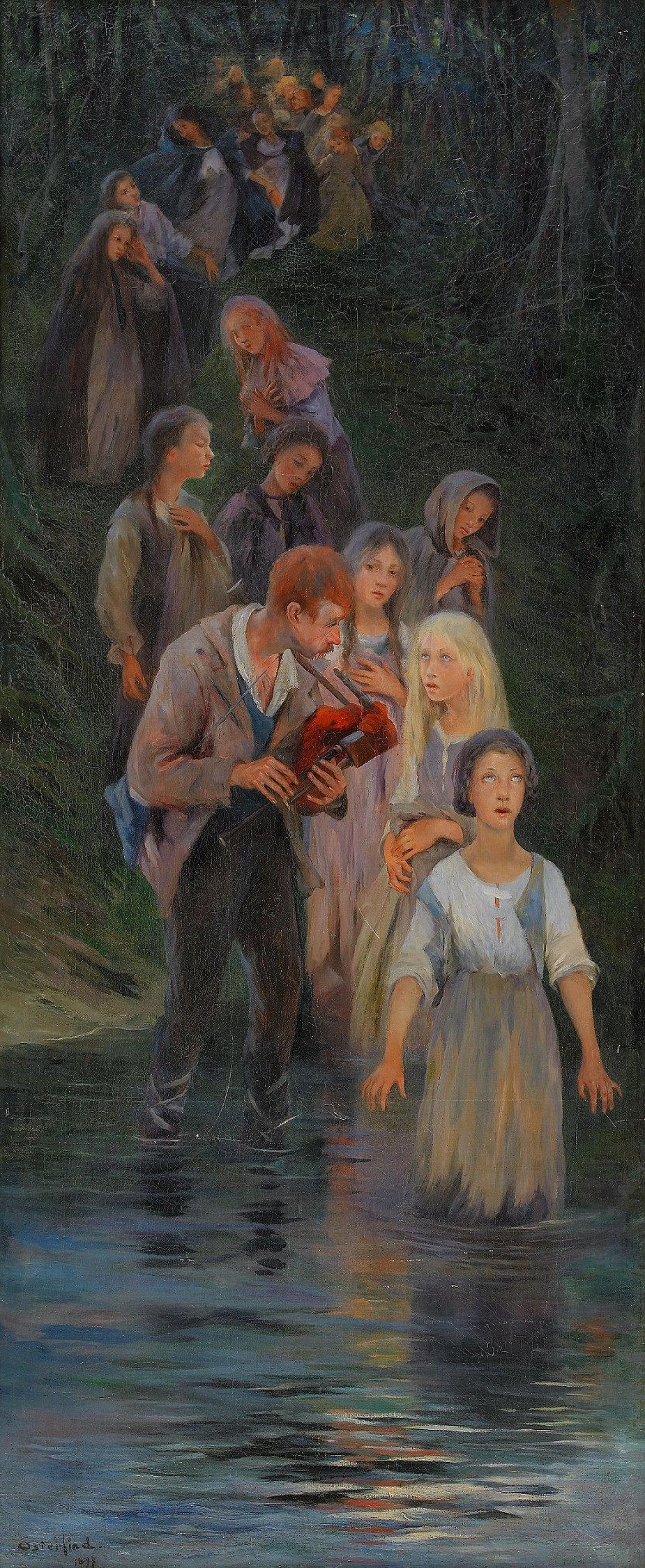
The Pied Piper of Hamelin

He was born to a family of the Swedish nobility and his father was a wholesale merchant. From 1874 to 1875, he studied at the Royal Swedish Academy of Fine Arts. As many young Swedish artist did, he went to Paris in 1877 so he could establish his career by exhibiting in the various salons. He soon became a member of the Swedish community there and became a lifelong friend of the painter, Ernst Josephson. He also became acquainted with Ville Vallgren, Christian Skredsvig, August Strindberg and Prince Eugen.

In 1878, he enrolled at the École des beaux-arts de Paris to study sculpture with Pierre-Jules Cavelier, who recommended that he become a painter and illustrator instead. From 1879, he was a frequent visitor to the artists' colonies at Barbizon and Grez-sur-Loing. Over the next decade, he gave several exhibits of watercolors and portraits, often with dark undertones. He also made visits to Brittany and Creuse, which became one of his favorite places.

In 1884 he, Josephson and Richard Bergh held a joint showing in Stockholm and, two years later, in Gothenburg. The following year, he became a signatory to an anti-Academy manifesto issued by a group known as the "Opponenterna". Despite opposition from King Oscar II, he and other Swedish expatriates participated in the Exposition Universelle (1889), and he was awarded a silver medal.

That same year, he married Joséphine Eugénie Carré (1862-1916), thereby legitimizing their two children, Anna Alina (born 1882) and Anders, who would also become a painter. As a result, he remained in France for the rest of his life, although he never gave up his connections to Sweden and maintained a regular correspondence with Prince Eugen..

In 1890, he ceased participating in showings at the regular salons and became a member of the Société nationale des beaux-arts, which began having annual exhibitions that year. Three years later, possibly at the urging of Josephson, he travelled throughout Andalusia, making sketches that would later become watercolors. In 1894, he was named a Chevalier in the Legion of Honour. In 1900, he founded an association of watercolorists and began creating aquatints.

The start of World War I and the death of his wife two years later left him in a state of depression and he spent more time travelling. He also began a curious collection of portrait paintings of the inhabitants of the Île-de-Bréhat, done on glasses and plates, at a local cabaret called the "Café des Pêcheurs". Apparently, unable to pay his bill, he had painted a portrait of himself as compensation. Several artists followed suit and the Café became known as the "Cabaret des Décapités". Some of them may still be seen at the Verrerie.

He died in poverty in 1938. His works may be seen at the Nationalmuseum, the Musée des beaux-arts de Tours, Musée des beaux-arts de Reims and several others in France and Sweden.

== Selected works ==
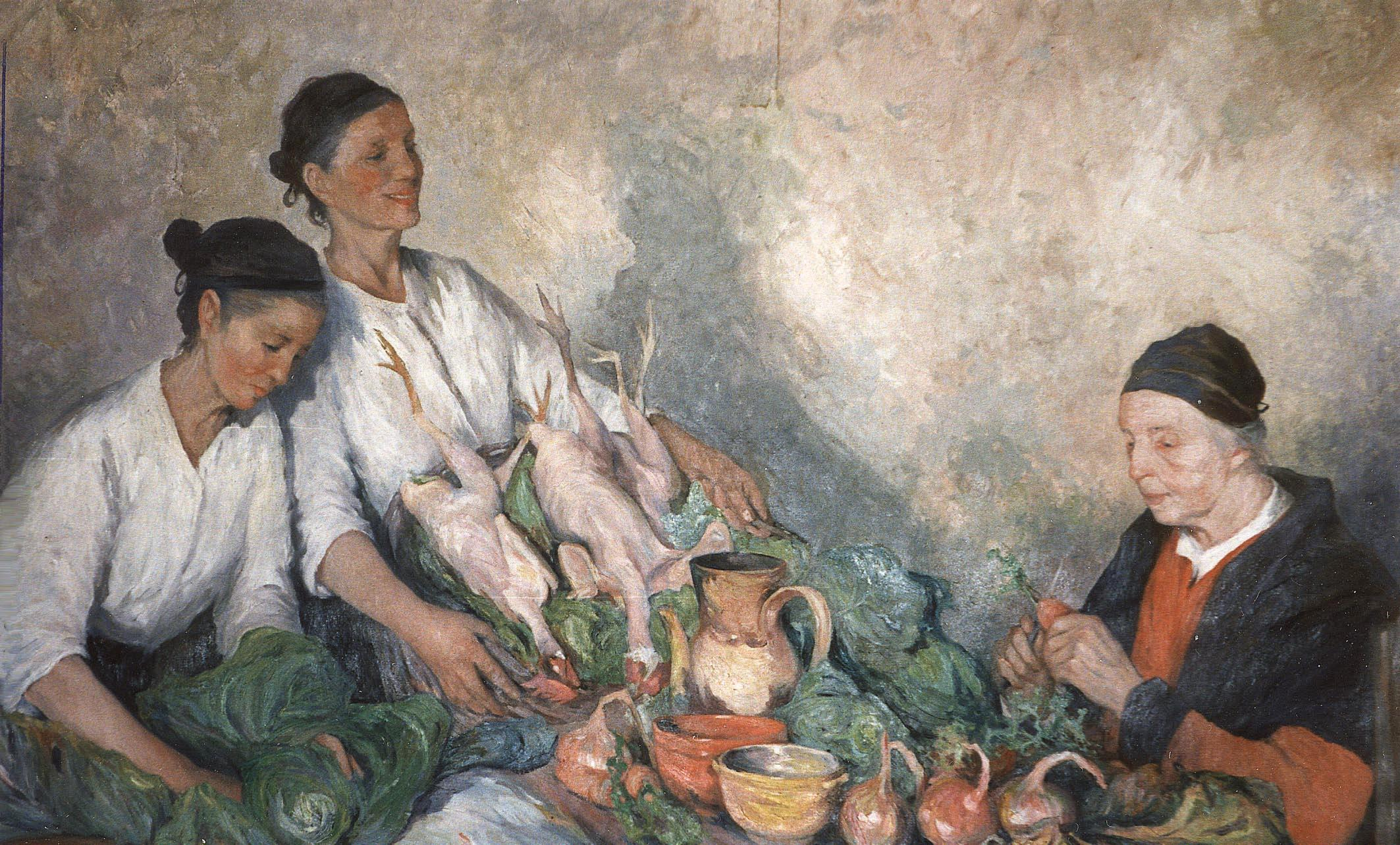
The Servants

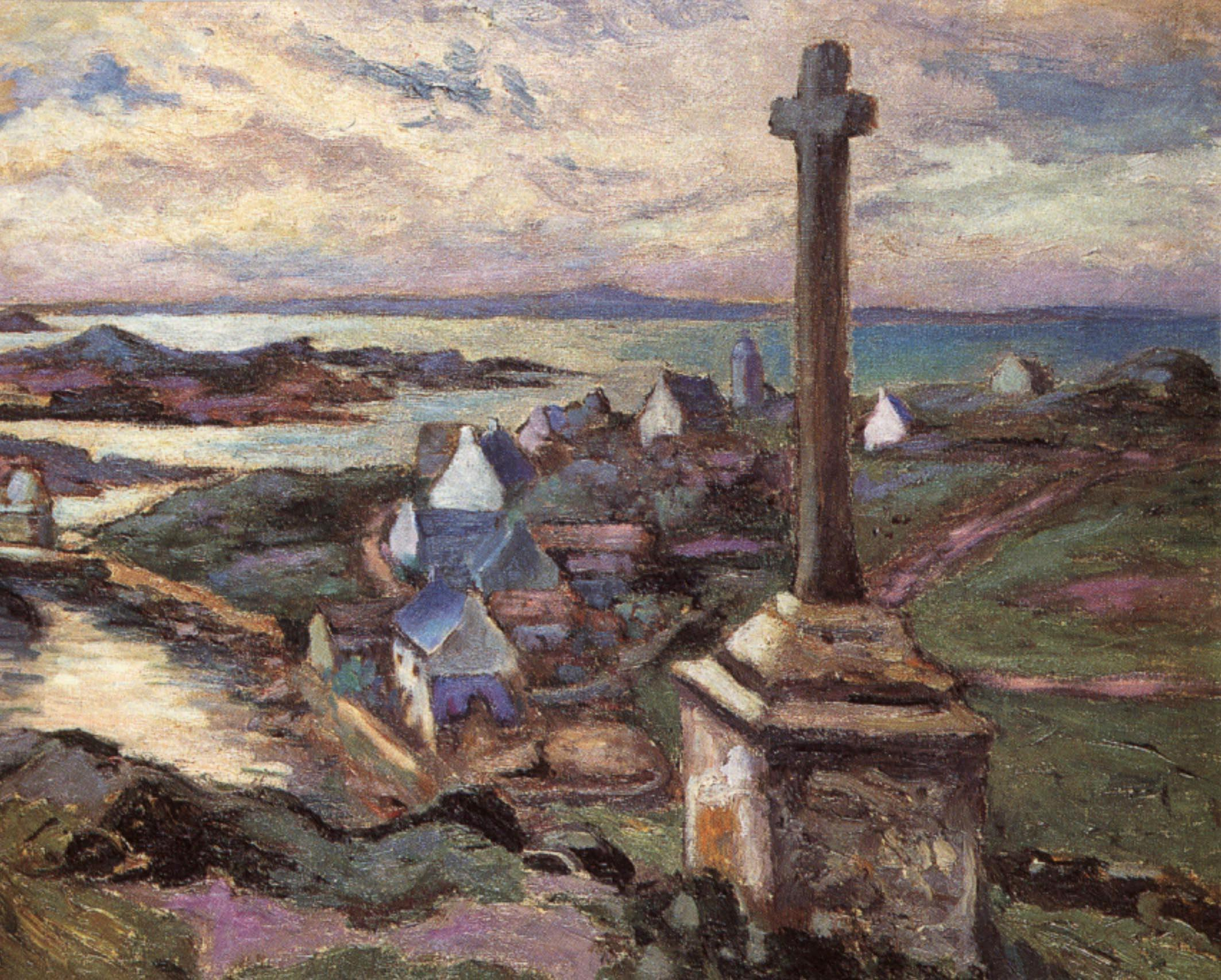
The Houses of Bréhat

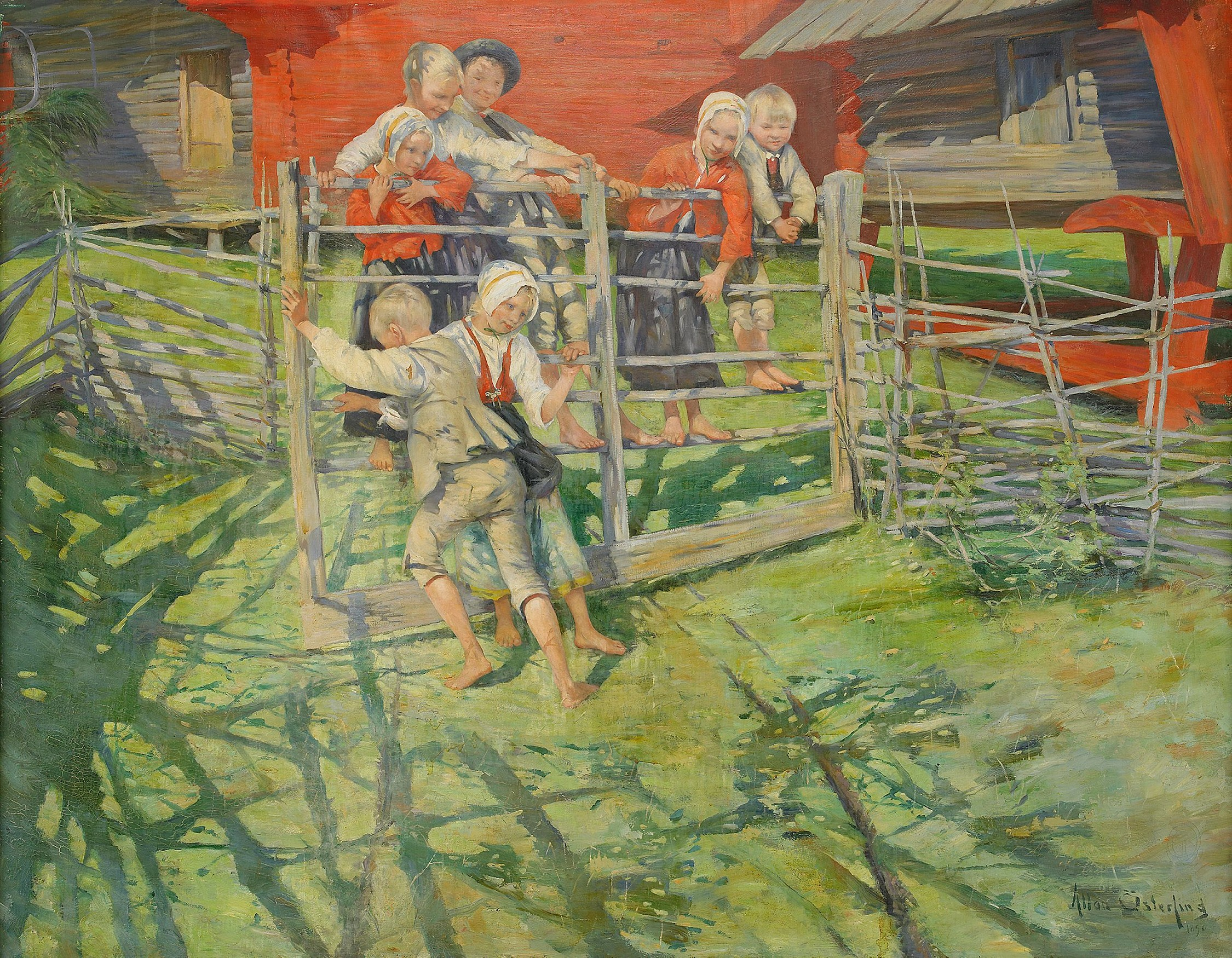
Children Playing

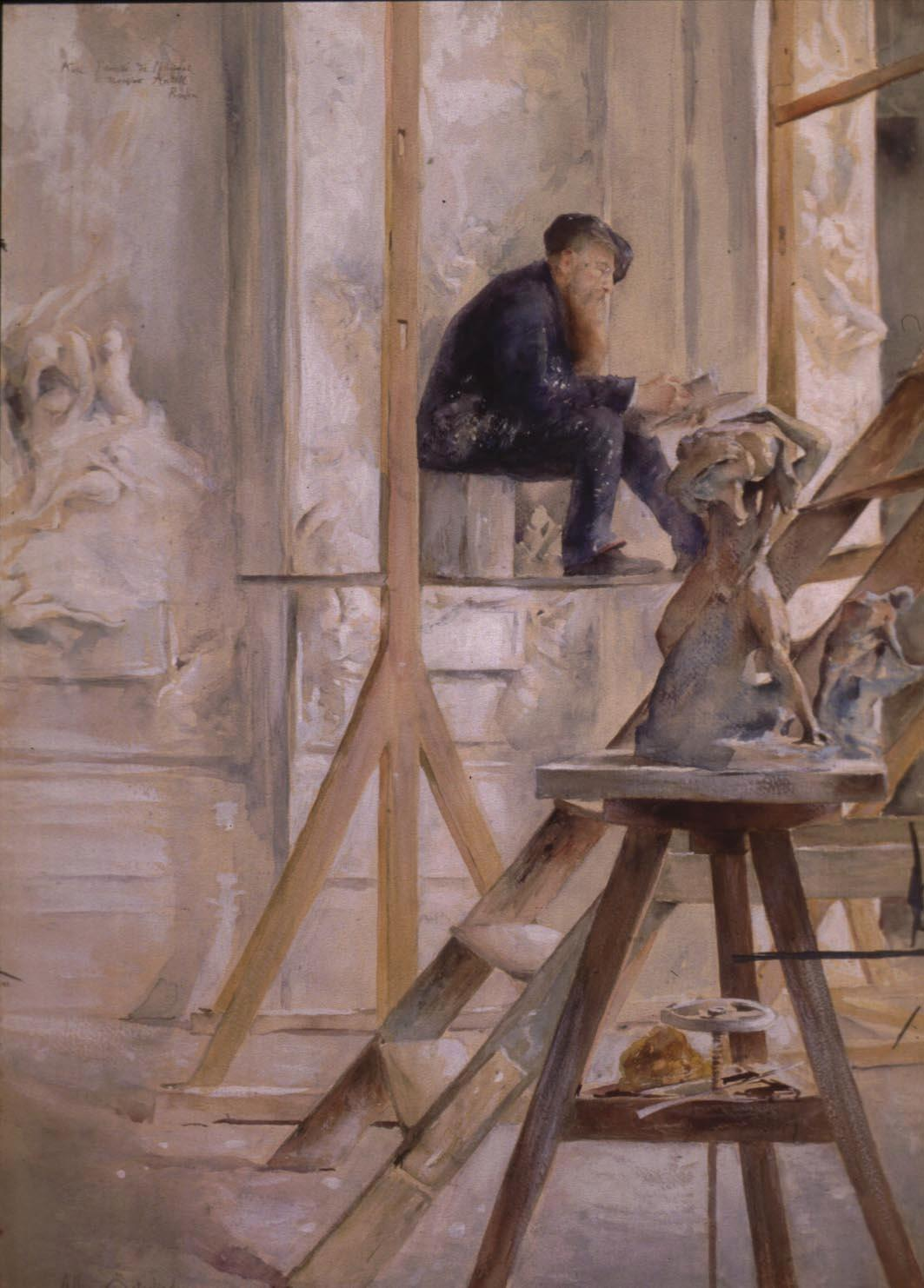
Rodin in His Studio
