= Roux brothers =

The Roux brothers were two French brothers who were restaurateurs and chefs working in Britain:

- Albert Roux (born Oct 8 1935, died Jan 4 2021)
- Michel Roux (born April 19 1941, died March 11 2020)

They operated Le Gavroche in London, the first restaurant in the UK to gain three Michelin stars, and The Waterside Inn, in Bray, Berkshire, which also held three stars.

== See also ==
- Michel Roux, Jr.
- Alain Roux
- Roux Scholarship
