= List of Michelin 3-star restaurants in the United Kingdom =

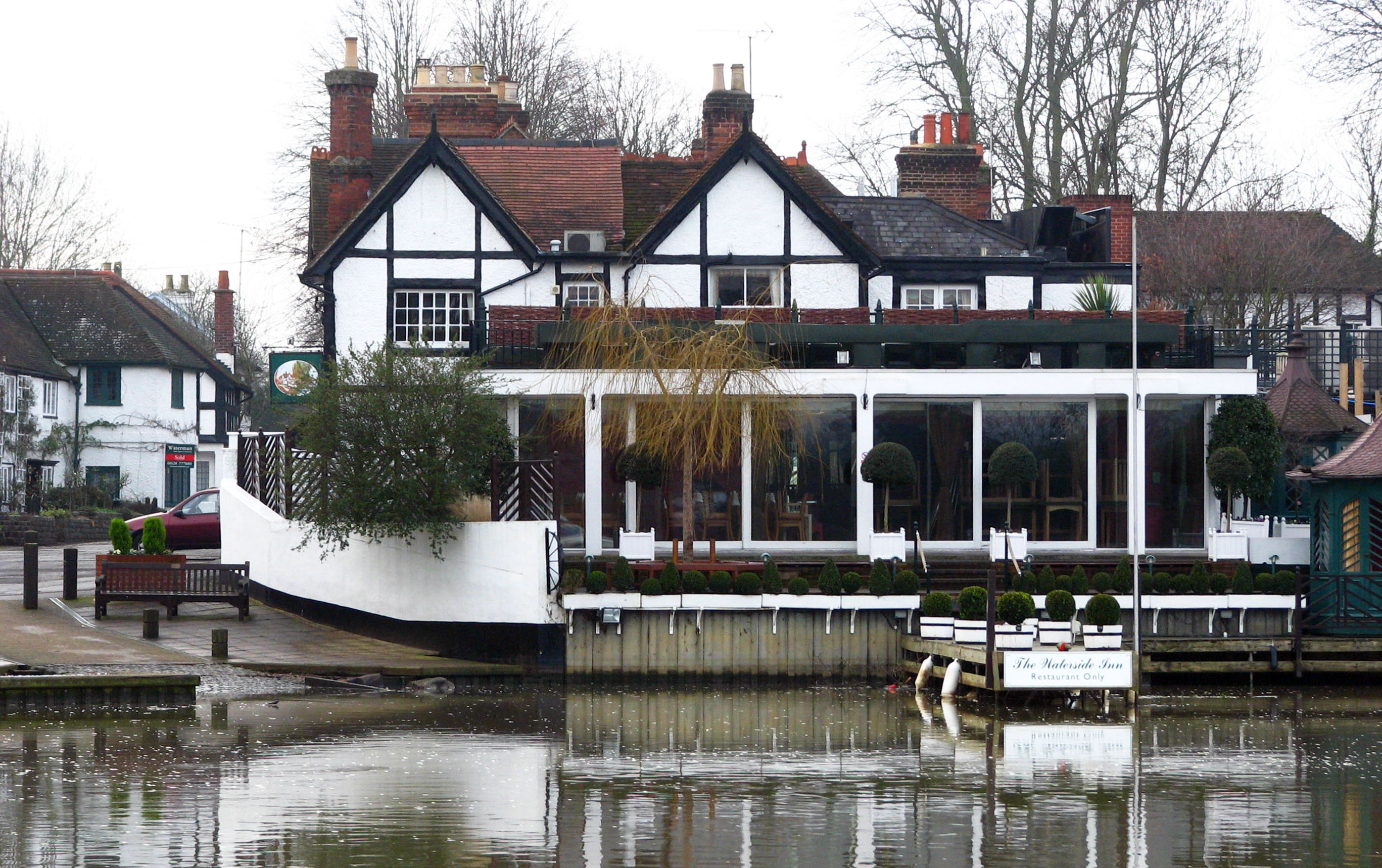
The Waterside Inn, the first restaurant outside France to hold three Michelin stars for 25 consecutive years

As of July 2025 there were ten restaurants in the UK holding three Michelin stars, with all except L’Enclume (Cumbria) and Moor Hall (Lancashire) located in London or the south of England.

Michelin stars are a rating system used by the red Michelin guide to grade restaurants on their quality. The guide was originally developed in 1900 to show French drivers where local amenities such as restaurants and mechanics were, the rating system was first introduced in 1926 as a single star, with the second and third stars introduced in 1933. According to the Guide, one star signifies "a very good restaurant", two stars are "excellent cooking that is worth a detour", and three stars mean "exceptional cuisine that is worth a special journey". The listing of starred restaurants is updated once a year.

The first restaurant in the UK to gain a Michelin star was Albert and Michel Roux's Le Gavroche, in London. It went on to become one of the first UK restaurants to win a second star in 1977, and the first to win a third, in 1982. In 2010 the Roux family's second restaurant, the Waterside Inn, became the first restaurant outside France to have held three Michelin stars for 25 years. The Roux family was also influential in training and influencing other chefs who themselves have gone on to win Michelin stars; Pierre Koffmann, Marco Pierre White and Gordon Ramsay all went on to open restaurants which earned three Michelin stars after working with the Roux brothers.

== List of Michelin 3-star restaurants ==
Key
1 Michelin star	One Michelin star
2 Michelin stars	Two Michelin stars
3 Michelin stars	Three Michelin stars
—	The restaurant did not receive a star that year
Closed	The restaurant is no longer open

Michelin 3-star restaurants
Restaurant	Chef	Cuisine	Location	Current	Year to star			Ref.
Restaurant	Chef	Cuisine	Location	Current	1 Michelin star	2 Michelin stars	3 Michelin stars	Ref.
Alain Ducasse at the Dorchester	Alain Ducasse	Contemporary French	London	3 Michelin stars	—	2009	2010–present	
Le Gavroche	Michel & Albert Roux	French	London	Closed	1974–1976	1977–1981, 1993–2024	1982–1993	
Chez Nico	Nico Ladenis	French	London (1973–1985, 1986—1999); Reading, Berkshire (1985–1986)	Closed	1981–1983	1984–1994	1995–1999	
The Fat Duck	Heston Blumenthal	Molecular gastronomy	Bray, Berkshire	3 Michelin stars	1999–2001	2002–2003	2004–2015, (Note: The Fat Duck does not appear in the 2016 Michelin Guide for the UK and Ireland as following a refurbishment and temporary relocation to Australia, it was not open in time to be considered.); 2017–present	
La Tante Claire	Pierre Koffmann	French	London	Closed	1979	1980–1982, 1999–2002	1983–1998	
Restaurant Gordon Ramsay	Gordon Ramsay	French	London	3 Michelin stars	—	1999–2000	2001–present	
The Restaurant Marco Pierre White (Note: The Restaurant Marco Pierre White was known simply as "The Restaurant" in 1994 when it was awarded two Michelin stars. After it moved to Mayfair in 1998, it became known as "Oak Room Marco Pierre White".)	Marco Pierre White	French	London	Closed	2001–2002	1994	1995–1999	
The Waterside Inn	Alain Roux	French	Bray, Berkshire	3 Michelin stars	1974–1976	1977–1984	1985–present	
The Araki	Mitsuhiro Araki	Japanese	London	—	—	2016–2017	2018–2020	
Sketch (The Lecture Room & Library)	Pierre Gagnaire	French	London	3 Michelin stars	2005–2011	2012–2018	2019–present	
Hélène Darroze at The Connaught	Hélène Darroze	French	London	3 Michelin stars	2009–2011	2011–2021	2021–present	
Core by Clare Smyth	Clare Smyth	British	London	3 Michelin stars	—	2018–2021	2021–present	
L'Enclume	Simon Rogan	British	Cartmel, Cumbria	3 Michelin stars	2005–2013	2013–2022	2022–present	
The Ledbury	Brett Graham	British	Notting Hill, London	3 Michelin stars	2009–2010	2010–2021, 2023–2024	2024–present	
Moor Hall	Mark Birchall	British	Aughton, Lancashire	3 Michelin stars	2017–2018	2018–2019	2025–present	

== See also ==
- Lists of restaurants
- List of restaurants in London
- List of Michelin 3-star restaurants
- List of Michelin-starred restaurants in England
- List of Michelin-starred restaurants in Ireland
- List of Michelin-starred restaurants in Greater London
- List of Michelin-starred restaurants in Northern Ireland
- List of Michelin-starred restaurants in Scotland
- List of Michelin-starred restaurants in Wales
