= L'Enclume =

Restaurant in Cumbria, England

Coordinates: 54.2017°N 2.9539°W

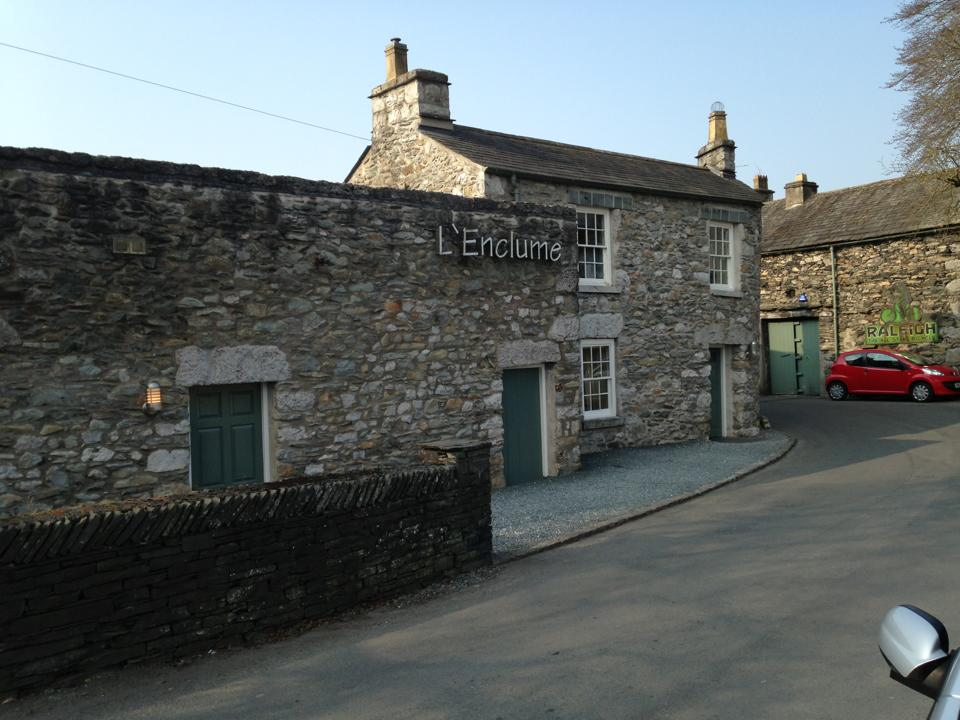
- L'Enclume in Cartmel in Cumbria, UK
- Interactive map of L'Enclume

Restaurant information
- Established: 2002; 24 years ago
- Chef: Simon Rogan
- Food type: Modern British
- Rating: (Michelin Guide); AA Rosettes
- Location: Cartmel, Cumbria, England
- Seating capacity: 50
- Reservations: Yes
- Website: lenclume.co.uk

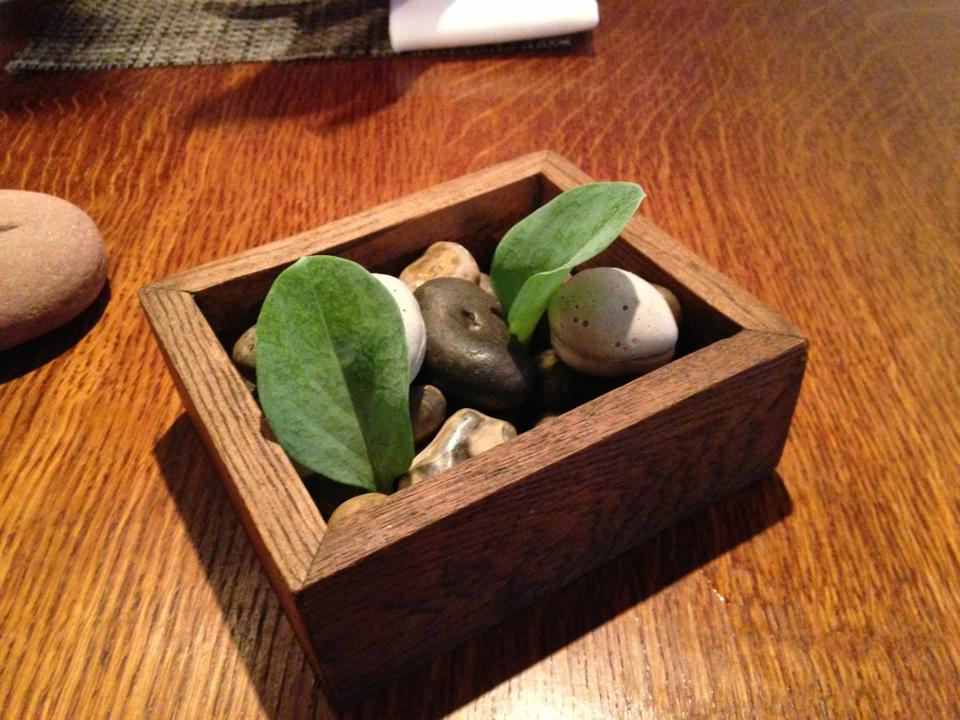
Oyster Pebbles at L'Enclume

L'Enclume (pronounced [lɑ̃.klym], French for "the anvil") is a Modern British restaurant opened in 2002 in Cartmel, Cumbria, England, run by the chef Simon Rogan and his partner, Penny Tapsell. L'Enclume received a rating of 10 out of 10 five times in The Good Food Guide and was named their top restaurant for the fourth consecutive year in the 2017 guide, and placed second in the 2018 guide. It has received three Michelin stars and five AA Rosettes.

== History ==
Following many years working as a chef, Rogan was keen to open his own restaurant and in 2002 whilst living in Littlehampton, he was told about an 800-year-old former smithy in Cartmel available to rent. Despite having never considered this location for a restaurant and hoping to open a restaurant closer to London between Brighton and the New Forest, Rogan made an offer for the property on the way home after visiting it and opened L'Enclume in 2002 with his partner Penny Tapsell. The name of the restaurant, meaning "anvil", is homage to the former blacksmith's workshop it is located within.

Most of the produce supplied to the restaurant is grown on Rogan's nearby twelve acre farm. The farm grows a variety of vegetables, herbs, edible flowers and rears meat including cows, chickens and pigs. The farm also has a young orchard which will grow a variety of fruit including apples, damsons and pears. Some of the food is also foraged by the restaurant's full-time forager.

L'Enclume was featured in The Trip, a 2010 BBC comedy starring Steve Coogan and Rob Brydon as fictionalised versions of themselves doing a restaurant tour of northern England.

=== Menu ===
The restaurant serves a 20-course tasting menu which has developed from the use of wild herbs and flowers, with Rogan inspired by chefs such as Marc Veyrat who uses plants and herbs from the Alps in his cooking. Rogan places importance on how ingredients are grown, saying: "It's a case of growing the perfect carrot rather than cooking it perfectly. My dream menu would serve 20 raw courses, but I know [he laughs] I'd never get away with that."

== Reception ==
L'Enclume was awarded its first Michelin star in 2005, its second in 2013 and its third in 2022. In September 2010, it was awarded its fifth AA Rosette.

In 2013, Matthew Norman of The Daily Telegraph gave the restaurant 10 out of 10, describing it as "the clearest expression of culinary genius I've experienced since the Fat Duck". In the 2014 edition of The Good Food Guide, L'Enclume was awarded a perfect 10 cooking score and topped the list of the UK's best restaurants. In 2016, Lucy Lovell of the Manchester Evening News rated L'Enclume 5 out of 5. It was voted the second best restaurant in Squaremeal's UK Top 100 Restaurants 2016. In the 2017 Good Food Guide, L'Enclume was awarded 10 out of 10 for the fifth time and was its top restaurant for the fourth consecutive year and retained its perfect 10 score in the 2018 guide, but pushed into second place by Restaurant Nathan Outlaw.

== See also ==
- List of Michelin 3-star restaurants in the United Kingdom
