= The Chef's Protege =

- Genre: Cooking
- Composer: Benson Taylor
- Country of origin: United Kingdom

Production
- Running time: 30 minutes

The Chef's Protege is a 2013 BBC Two television cooking series that was cancelled after one season. It was a serialized competition that followed three Michelin star chefs becoming mentors, as they return to their old catering colleges to select and train a protégé.

Each chef has an initial group of seven student candidates and over the course of the series must eliminate less able candidates until they choose the one who will become their protégé. The climax of the series is a head to head competition of all three protégés where they cook for the chef's own mentors, who will judge them not only their skills as a chef, but also by how well they are able to represent their mentor's style and philosophy of cooking.

== Chefs and mentors ==
The three chefs and their mentors who appear in the program are:

- Tom Kitchin, the head chef of the one Michelin star restaurant The Kitchin who was mentored by Pierre Koffman at La Tante Claire.
- Theo Randall, the head chef of Theo Randall at the InterContinental and former holder of one Michelin star at The River Café in London where he was mentored by Ruth Rogers before becoming its head chef. Randall was also mentored at the same establishment by Rose Gray, who died before the series was commissioned.
- Michel Roux, Jr., the head chef of the two Michelin star restaurant Le Gavroche, who was mentored by his father Albert Roux at the same restaurant before becoming its head chef.

== Colleges ==
The three colleges featured are:

- Perth College, where Tom Kitchin studied.
- Brooklands College, where Theo Randall studied.
- University College Birmingham. While Michel Roux, Jr. did not attend this college himself, the Roux family have strong ties to the college.

== Episodes ==
The series consists of twenty episodes, initially broadcast on consecutive weekday evenings over four weeks. Each of the first three weeks focused on a different chef each week reducing their initial seven candidates down to two semi-finalists with Kitchin appearing in the first week, Randall in the second week and Roux in the third. The final week had the semi-finalists compete for the place as each chef's protégé over the first three nights in the same order as the opening weeks. The penultimate night is devoted to the proteges cooking a three course menu for their mentor of which two dishes were selected to go forward, after feedback to improve them by their mentor, to the final night for judging by the chef's mentors themselves.

== Winner ==
The competition was won by Jamie MacKinnon, Tom Kitchin's protégé, who scored forty points from the chef's mentors, beating the protégés of Theo Randall and Michel Roux, Jr. who scored thirty six points each.

== Future ==
All three protégés have been offered jobs by their mentors when they complete their college education. Michel Roux Jr. has asked the runner up to his protégé to contact him when they finish also.
