= The Fat Duck =

Restaurant in Bray, Berkshire, England

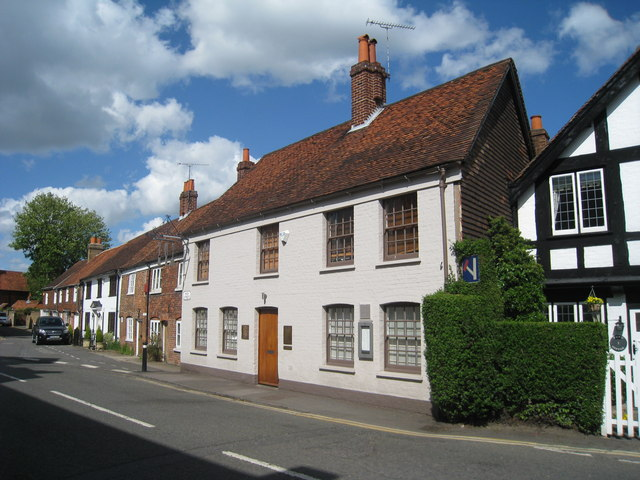

- Location of The Fat Duck, in Bray, Berkshire

Restaurant information
- Established: 1995; 31 years ago
- Owner: Heston Blumenthal
- Food type: Molecular gastronomy; nouvelle cuisine; British
- Rating: Michelin stars AA Rosettes
- Location: Bray, Berkshire, England
- Coordinates: 51.50793°N 0.701764°W
- Website: thefatduck.co.uk

The Fat Duck is a fine dining restaurant in Bray, Berkshire, England, owned by the chef Heston Blumenthal. Housed in a 16th-century building, the Fat Duck opened on 16 August 1995. Although it originally served food similar to a French bistro, it soon acquired a reputation for precision and innovation, and has been at the forefront of many modern culinary developments, such as food pairing, flavour encapsulation and multi-sensory cooking.

The number of staff in the kitchen increased from four when the Fat Duck opened to 42, resulting in a ratio of one kitchen staff member per customer. The Fat Duck gained its first Michelin star in 1999, its second in 2002 and its third in 2004, making it one of eight restaurants in the UK to earn three Michelin stars. In 2005, the World's 50 Best Restaurants named the Fat Duck the best restaurant in the world. It lost its stars in 2016 when it closed for renovation, but regained all three the following year.

The Fat Duck is known for its tasting menu featuring dishes such as nitro-scrambled egg and bacon ice cream, an Alice in Wonderland–inspired mock turtle soup involving a bouillon packet made up to look like a fob watch dissolved in tea, and a dish called Sound of the Sea which includes an audio element. It has an associated laboratory where Blumenthal and his team develop new dish concepts. In 2009, the Fat Duck suffered from the largest norovirus outbreak ever documented at a restaurant, with more than 400 diners falling ill.

== History ==
=== 1995—1998: First years ===
The Fat Duck opened in 1995, staffed only by Blumenthal and a dishwasher. It is located in a 16th-century cottage that was modified in the 19th and 20th centuries. It was previously a pub, the Ringers. The building was Grade II listed by English Heritage on 2 May 1989.

The Fat Duck initially served meals in the style of a French bistro, such as lemon tart and steak and chips. Blumenthal said that science had already begun to influence the cooking at this stage, as already on the menu were his triple-cooked chips, which were developed to stop the potato from going soft. Blumenthal sold his house, his car and many of his possessions to avoid bankruptcy.

=== 1999—2003: First Michelin stars ===
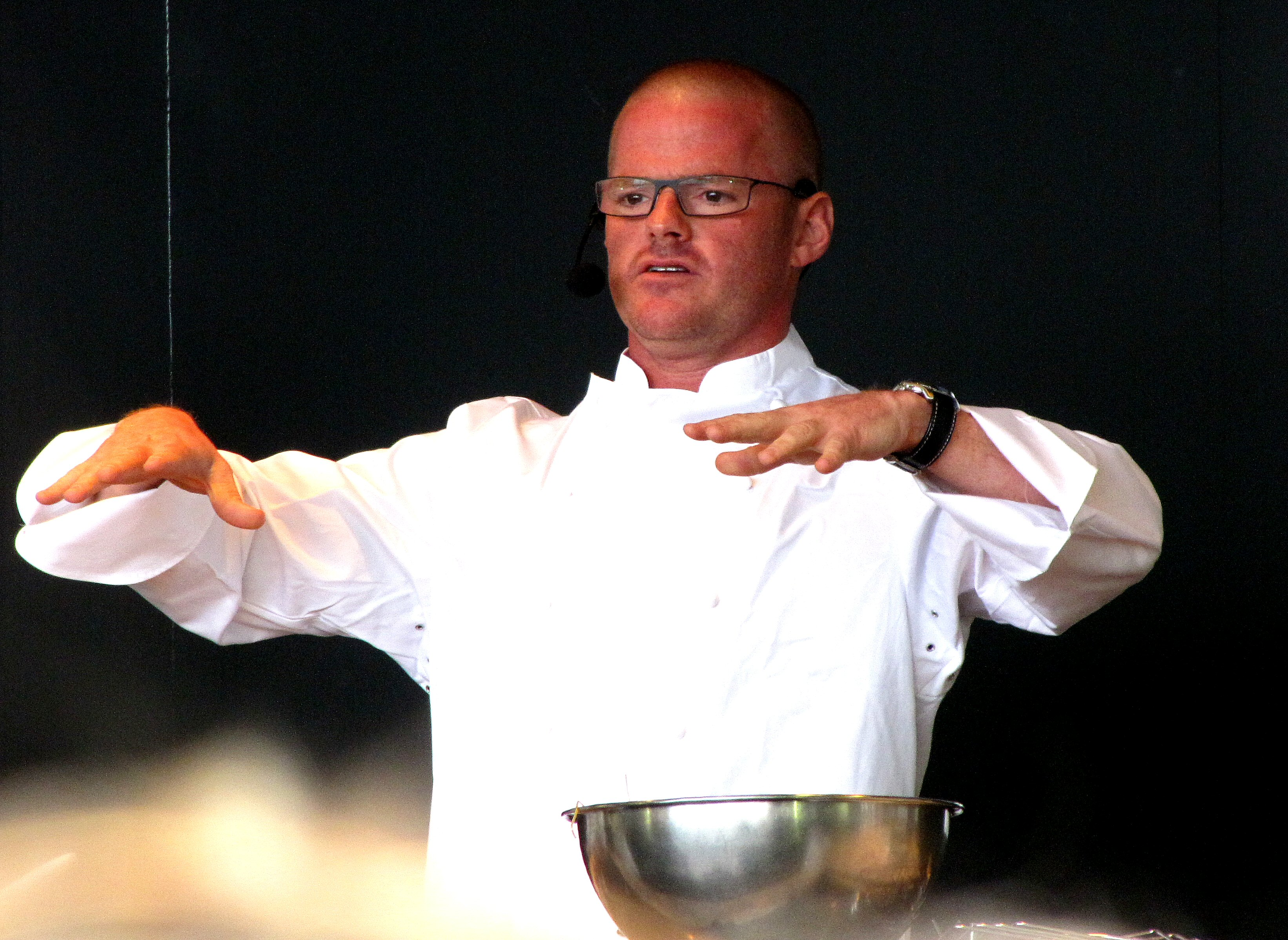
Heston Blumenthal, the chef proprietor

After four years, the Fat Duck was awarded its first Michelin star in the 1999 list. Blumenthal worked with the physics professor Peter Barham of the University of Bristol, and developed a menu of dishes through experimentation such as slow-cooked lamb which avoids shocking the fibres in the meat and causing them to seize. By 2000, techniques were being used such as cooking vegetables in mineral water after discovering that the levels of calcium in tap water causes their discolouration, and freezing cuttlefish to break down the molecules and increase their tenderness.

In 2001, the Fat Duck was awarded a second Michelin star and was named restaurant of the year by the AA. In 2002, Blumenthal opened a second restaurant in Bray, the Riverside Brasserie, selling many of the Fat Duck's earlier dishes at reduced prices. The critic Jay Rayner gave it a positive review, calling it "truly stunning value", with the best lemon tart he had ever tasted.

=== 2004—2008: Third Michelin star and international acclaim ===
In 2004, the Fat Duck became the third restaurant in the UK to receive three Michelin stars, after the Waterside Inn, also in Bray, and Restaurant Gordon Ramsay in London. It was the fastest that a British restaurant had gone from one to three stars. At the time he received his third star, Blumenthal said it was the closest he had been to bankruptcy, with enough money only to cover the following week's staff wages. Immediately after receiving the third star, the Fat Duck began receiving hundreds of phone calls seeking reservations a day. Blumenthal hired Tony Baker as managing director to help deal with the demand.

In the same year, the Fat Duck was ranked second in the world behind the French Laundry by the World's 50 Best Restaurants. It also received the title of Square Meal BMW Best UK Restaurant 2004. That year, food and safety officers found "borderline" levels of listeria in the foie gras and expressed concern that "no core temperatures of the meat are taken". The Daily Telegraph reported that the Fat Duck dealt with the problem and introduced "stringent procedures."

In 2005, the World's 50 Best Restaurants named the Fat Duck the best restaurant in the world. At the first Front of House Awards in 2007, it won the awards for Overall Service and Front Desk of the Year. As of 2007, the Fat Duck employed 32 chefs, with a weekly wage bill of around £35,000. It seated 46 people for lunch and dinner six days a week, with an average spend of around £175 per head and an annual turnover of more than £4 million. Additional income came from books and television. In 2008, Blumenthal published The Big Fat Duck Cookbook.

=== 2009: Norovirus outbreak ===
On 27 February 2009, Blumenthal closed the Fat Duck temporarily after a number of customers reported feeling unwell at different times. On 6 March, it was reported that 400 people had stated they had felt unwell after eating at the restaurant. The cause was later given by the Health Protection Agency as norovirus, thought to have originated from oysters harvested from beds contaminated with sewage. The virus spread further after being contracted by staff members. The Fat Duck was criticised for its cleaning methods and its slow response, and received 529 complaints of illness. It was the largest norovirus outbreak ever documented at a restaurant. The Fat Duck reopened on 12 March 2009.

=== 2012: Deaths of senior staff ===
On 19 November 2012, the senior staff members Jorge Ivan Arango Herrera and Carl Magnus Lindgren were killed on Chai Wan Road, Hong Kong, when their taxi was hit by two buses. The taxi driver, Wong Kim-chung, was also killed, and a further 56 people were injured.

=== 2014—present: Australian opening ===
On 31 March 2014, Blumenthal announced he would close the Fat Duck for renovations for six months and temporarily relocate it with its entire team to Crown Towers in Melbourne, Australia. During those six months, the Australian restaurant was also named the Fat Duck, after which it was renamed after Blumenthal's London restaurant Dinner. It was the second restaurant with that name, Blumenthal's sixth restaurant and his first restaurant outside of Britain. This temporary closure of the Bray location made the Fat Duck ineligible for assessment for the 2016 Michelin Guide, thus losing its three-starred status. It regained the stars the following year. As of 2025, Blumenthal was spending more time at the Fat Duck than he had done over the preceding 20 years, and was preparing a menu for its 30th anniversary.

== Facilities ==
The Fat Duck has 14 tables and can seat 42 diners. It has a high proportion of chefs working, 42, equating to one chef per diner. Much of the menu is developed by experimentation: for example, the egg and bacon ice cream came about following Blumenthal investigating the principles of "flavour encapsulation". A research laboratory where Blumenthal and his team develop dishes is two doors away opposite the Hind's Head pub, which he also owns. It was where the majority of the laboratory scenes for the television series Heston Blumenthal: In Search of Perfection were filmed. The lab equipment includes a centrifuge which is used to make chocolate wine, and a vacuum oven. The restaurant takes reservations up to two months in advance, and in 2011 it was receiving some 30,000 calls for reservations per day, although that figure also included people who could not get through and were redialling.

== Menu ==
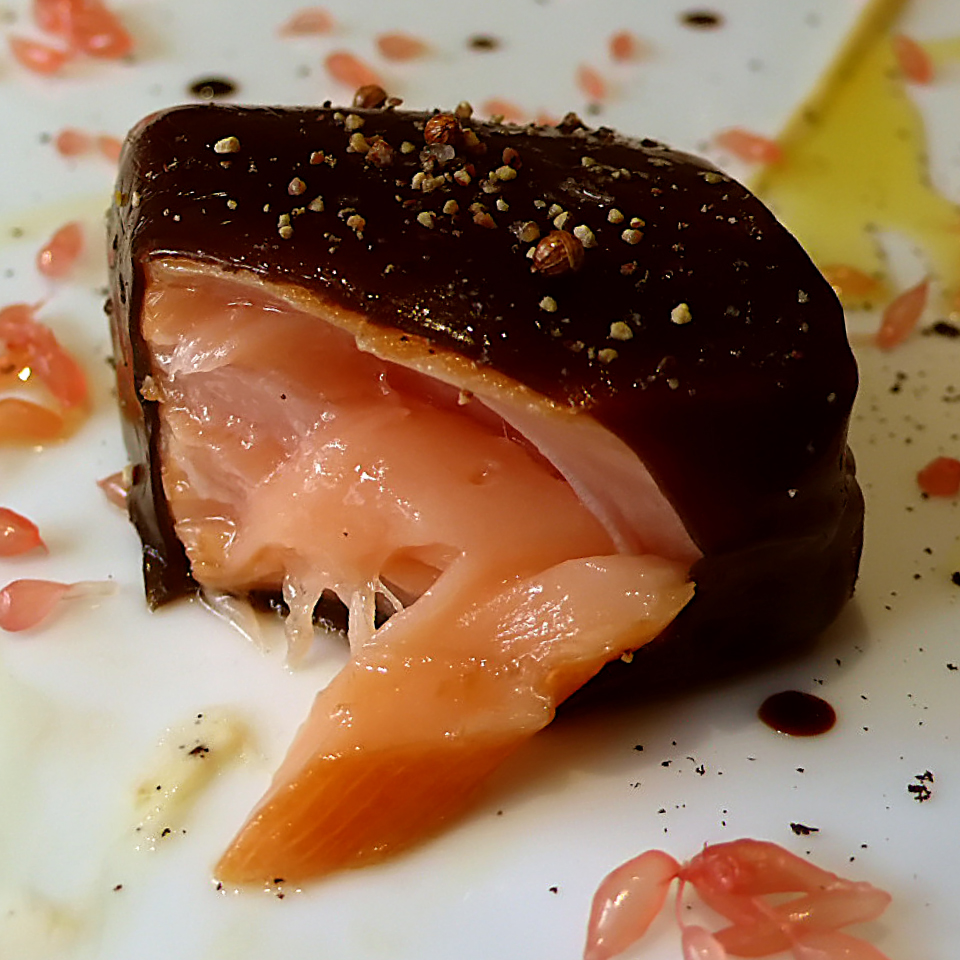
Salmon poached in liquorice gel served with an artichoke vanilla mayonnaise

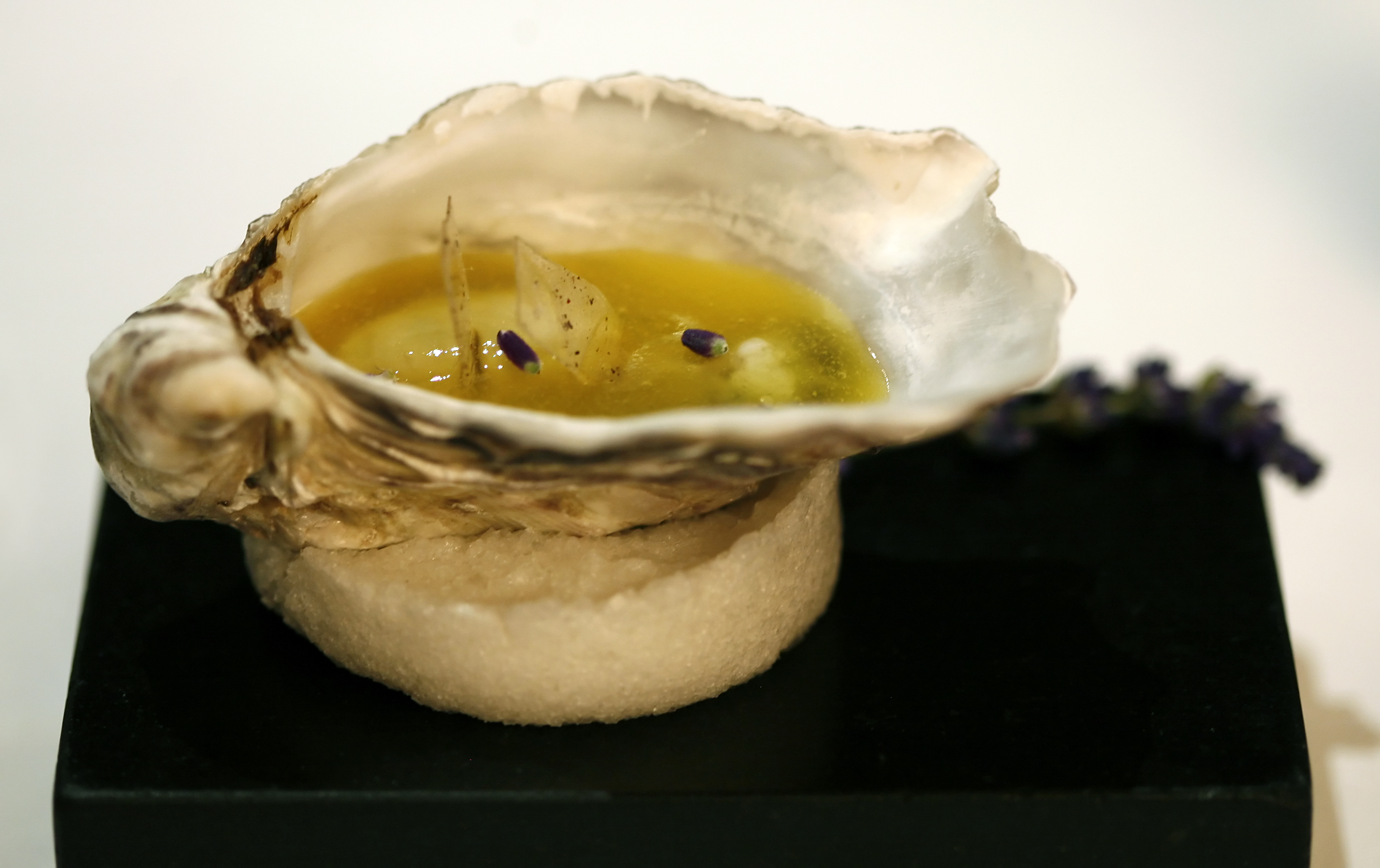
Oyster and passion fruit jelly on lavender, served in an oyster shell

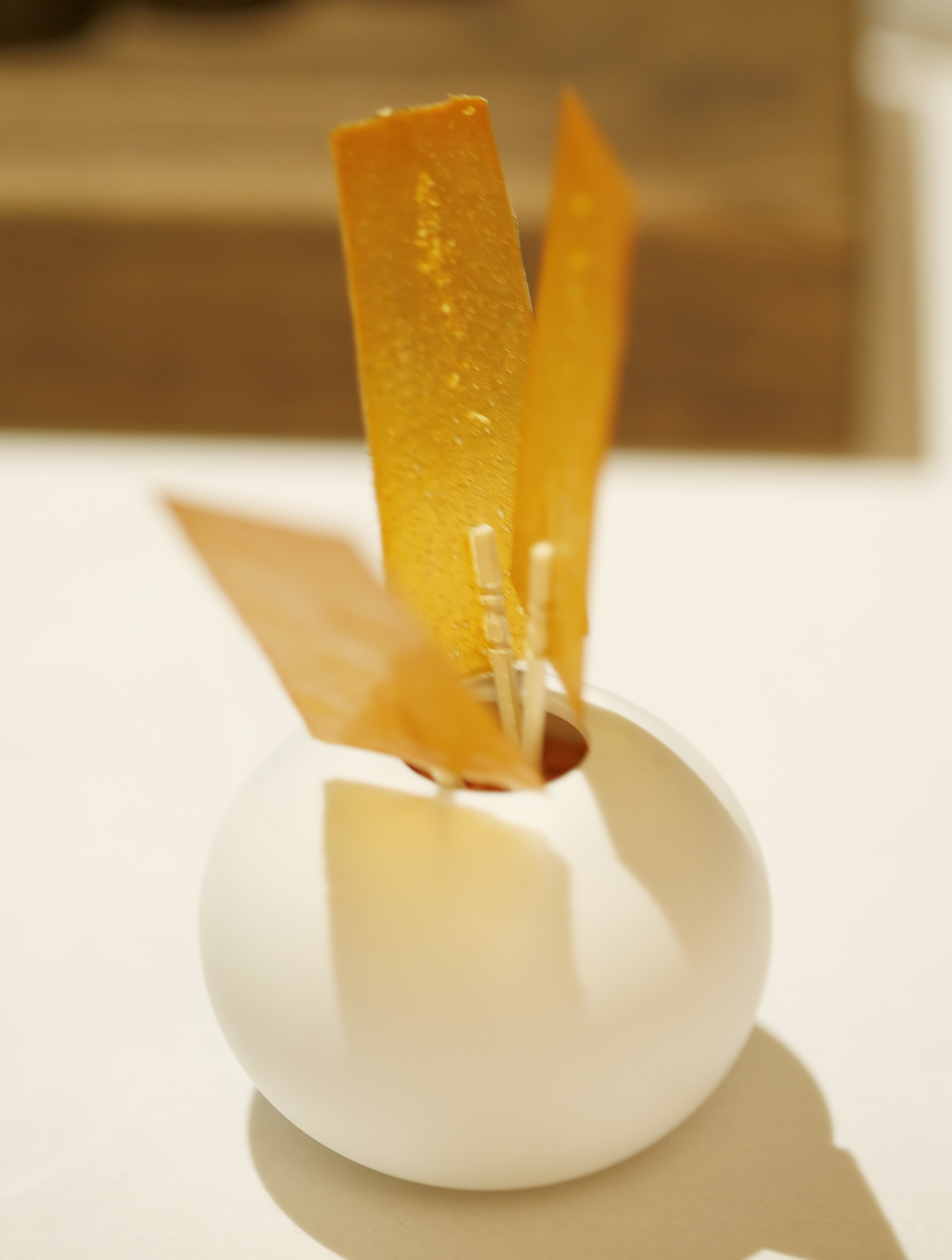
Carrot and orange lolly

Blumenthal was inspired as a teenager by trips to the Michelin-starred restaurants in France and the work of Harold McGee. McGee's work in particular led him to question traditional cooking techniques and approaches which resulted in combinations which may at first appear unusual. Blumenthal incorporates psychology and the perception of diners into his dishes. He gave the example of a dish of sardine on toast sorbet: "The brain will be trying to tell the palate to expect a dessert and you will therefore be tasting more sweetness than actually exists."

The Fat Duck serves a tasting menu. Dishes served include palate cleansers made of vodka and green tea, frozen in liquid nitrogen, a snail porridge described by one food writer as "infamous", and ice creams of both crab, and egg and bacon, each of which drew media attention. The mock turtle soup has an Alice in Wonderland theme, whereby a fob watch formed of freeze-dried beef stock covered with gold leaf is dropped into a teacup by a waiter, who pours a beef stock "tea" poured over it that dissolves the gold and the watch. A plate of ox tongue and vegetables is served alongside to place into the soup. Toast sandwiches, developed for an appearance on Heston's Feasts, are served as a side dish. Dishes are served with additional sensory inputs, such as "Sounds of the Sea", a plate of seafood served with a seafood foam on top of a "beach" of tapioca, breadcrumbs and eel. Alongside the dish, diners are given an iPod to listen to crashing waves whilst they eat. Other sensory components include "the smell of the Black Forest" that accompanies a kirsch ice cream.

In 2023, the Fat Duck introduced its 12-dish Sensorium menu, which the Times said was more conventional and "dials down the trickery and sleights of hand". It incorporates new seasonal dishes alongside previous dishes such as the Sound of Sea and A Walk in the Woods ("an edible forest floor of mushrooms, blackberries and beetroot").

== Reception ==
Ben Rogers reviewed the Fat Duck for The Independent in 1996, before it had gained any Michelin stars. He discovered that Blumenthal was cooking foie gras in sherry to give it a nutty flavour, but Rogers was not sure if this was warranted. He praised a jambonneau of duck, but found the monkfish rubbery. He described the menu as "awkwardly written, badly punctuated, and at points quite impenetrable". After the Fat Duck received its first Michelin star, David Fingleton visited it for The Spectator in 1999, and found the experience "beyond reproach; unsullied pleasure from start to finish".

In 2001, Terry Durack reviewed the Fat Duck for The Independent. He was initially hesitant, expecting tricks straight away, but was surprised to find a bowl of normal green olives on the table as he arrived. He did not enjoy a mustard ice cream in a red cabbage gazpacho soup, but described the restaurant as "great" and gave it a score of 17 out of 20. In 2004, following the third Michelin star, Jan Moir of The Daily Telegraph gave it a negative review, saying that "while many of the flavours are politely interesting, the relentless pappy textures of mousses and foams and creams and poached meats really begins to grate". She also found it overpriced, calling it the "Fat Profit".

Matthew Fort reviewed the Fat Duck for The Guardian in 2005, and wrote that "there is no doubt that the Fat Duck is a great restaurant and Heston Blumenthal the most original and remarkable chef this country has ever produced". In The Times, A. A. Gill recommended that people should "eat here at least once to find out what is really going on in your mouth". Also in 2005, the German critic Wolfram Siebeck visited the restaurant and complained of the delays in service and of several of the dishes. He described the mustard ice cream in a red cabbage gazpacho soup as a "fart of nothingness". The chef Nico Ladenis said, "Someone who makes egg and bacon ice cream is hailed a genius. If you vomit and make ice cream out of it, are you a star?" Tony Naylor of The Guardian enjoyed his trip in 2008. He defended the price, likening the occasional purchase of an exceptional meal to spending on entertainment or hobbies. In 2012, Fodor's described the Fat Duck as "extraordinary" and "one of the best restaurants in the country", and Frommer's gave it three stars, grading it "exceptional".

In 2005, the Fat Duck was ranked first on the list of the World's 50 Best Restaurants. After spending 11 years on the list, it dropped to 73rd. It has been ranked second-best on numerous occasions, first behind the French Laundry and then behind El Bulli. In 2012, it was ranked 13th. In 2009, the Fat Duck was the only restaurant to be given a top score of ten out of ten in the Good Food Guide. The editor of the guide, Elizabeth Carter, wrote: "It's extremely rare that a restaurant cooks perfectly on a consistent basis, but we've had so many superlative reports that we're delighted to recognise the Fat Duck as the best restaurant in Britain." It retained that score through to the 2013 edition. In 2010, it was named the Best UK Restaurant in the Quintessentially Awards, a scheme run by the Quintessentially Group.

Gill reviewed the Fat Duck again in 2016, and gave the food five out of five and the atmosphere four. He wrote: "There is not another restaurant anywhere doing anything remotely this brave or this daft. It is so out there, it has left the food section altogether. This is what rocking, unmediated genius tastes like. Hidden under the big top of it all is still some of the finest food in the world." Reviewing the Fat Duck for the Times in 2023, Tony Turnbull wrote that the menu had become more conventional, with better results: "By messing less with our brains, Blumenthal allows us to focus more on the complexities and multi-tiered flavour of the dishes, faultlessly executed by the head chef Edward Cooke. There we were thinking it was all about the conjuring show, when in fact — who knew? — it was just about putting delicious things in our mouths." Turnbull said his meal was the best of his three visits.

== See also ==
- List of Michelin 3-star restaurants
- List of Michelin 3-star restaurants in the United Kingdom
- Dinner by Heston Blumenthal
- The Hind's Head
