= Michel Albert Roux =

British-French chef and restaurateur

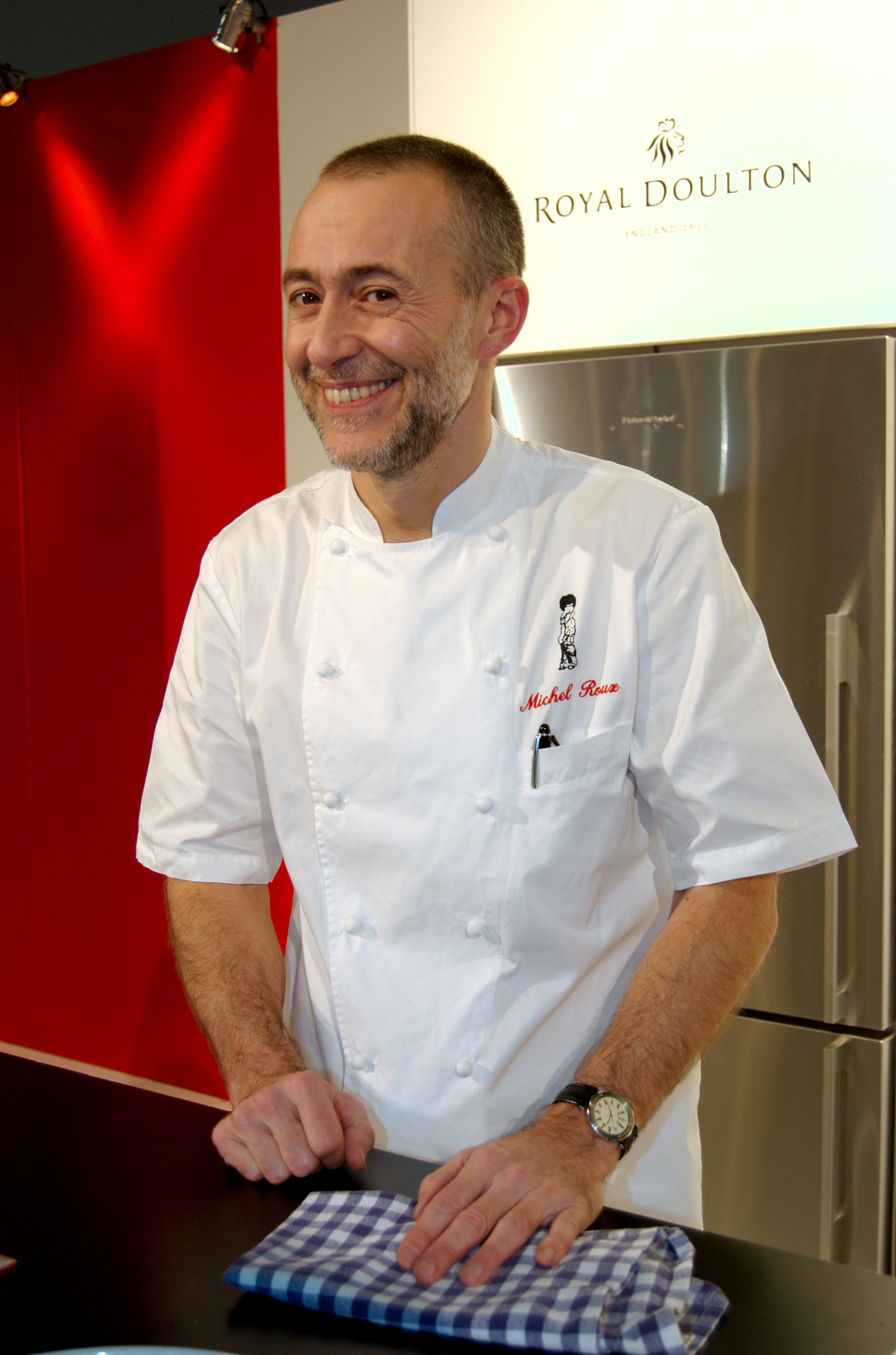
- Roux in 2008
- Born: Michel Albert Roux; 23 May 1960 (age 66); Pembury, Kent, England
- Education: Patissier Hellegouarche; Le Gavroche; Alain Chapel; French Army/Elysee Palace; Pierre Koffman; Emanuel School
- Years active: 1985–present
- Spouse: Giselle Roux
- Children: 1
- Culinary career
- Ratings
- Michelin stars AA Rosettes; Good Food Guide
- Previous restaurants
- Le Gavroche; Roux at Parliament Square
- Television shows
- Michel Roux's Service; MasterChef: The Professionals; Food and Drink; Saturday Kitchen; French Country Cooking
- Website: www.michelroux.co.uk

Michel Albert Roux (born 23 May 1960) also known as Michel Roux Jr., is an English-French chef. He owned the 2 Michelin-starred restaurant Le Gavroche in London, which was opened by his father Albert Roux and uncle Michel Roux, until it closed on 13 January 2024.

== Early life ==
Roux was born at Pembury maternity hospital in Kent, while his father Albert Roux was working for the horse race trainer Major Peter Cazalet.

== Apprenticeship and training ==
After leaving school at age 16, Roux undertook apprenticeship work with Master Patissier Henri Hellegouarch in Paris. From summer 1979 until January 1980, he worked as a commis de cuisine at Le Gavroche, under both his father and his uncle. He then spent two years as a commis de cuisine trainee under Alain Chapel at his hotel and restaurant in Mionnay, in the Rhône-Alpes region near Lyon.

After undertaking basic training with the French Army, from February 1982 to March 1983 he served his military service at the Élysée Palace, working for President François Mitterrand. Having finished his military service, Roux then worked for four months in Paris: two months at Charcuterie Gérard Mothu in St-Mandé; and then two months at Boucherie Lamartine on the Avenue Victor-Hugo.

== Career ==
Having served his apprenticeship and training mainly away from the Roux brothers' British businesses, he joined his uncle at the Waterside Inn, in Bray, Berkshire in 1985, before working with his father at Le Gavroche from the April of the same year. He then worked in and managed the Roux brothers catering business for three years, before returning to Le Gavroche in 1990, the year the two brothers split their business down family lines. When his father retired in 1993, Michel Jr took over the restaurant.

A food consultant to the Walbrook club since 2003, he also consults for the fine dining providers Restaurant Associates. Roux has also written several books, including Le Gavroche Cookbook; The Marathon Chef; and Matching Food and Wine, which was named the best book on matching wine and food at the Gourmand World Cookbook Awards.

In August 2023, Roux announced that he would be closing Le Gavroche to focus on a better work-life balance without the daily demands of a busy Michelin-starred restaurant. The restaurant's last day of business was on 13 January 2024.

=== Media ===
Roux has made various television appearances, including on his friend Gordon Ramsay's ITV produced Hell's Kitchen, and as an expert judge on the BBC Two programme MasterChef: The Professionals (2008–13). In 2012 he appeared as a guest judge on Masterchef South Africa. From 2013 until 2014, Roux co-presented BBC Two's Food and Drink alongside Kate Goodman. In 2013, he appeared as one of the mentors in the series The Chef's Protege.

In March 2014, Roux announced that he was leaving the BBC due to a conflict over his brand ambassadorship for Albert Bartlett Rooster potatoes. In 2015, Roux returned to television and presented First Class Chefs for the Disney Channel and Kitchen Impossible with Michel Roux Jr for Channel 4.

In April 2016 Roux stepped in as presenter on BBC's Saturday Kitchen after the departure of James Martin who left after 10 years. Roux ruled himself out of becoming a full-time host.

From September 2021 to December 2022, Roux presented two series of Michel Roux's French Country Cooking; shown on Food Network.

Roux was a judge on Five Star Kitchen: Britain's Next Great Chef; a culinary competition series that aired during June-July 2023 on Channel 4.

== Controversies ==
In November 2016, The Guardian reported that whilst Roux's restaurant made over £250,000 in profit in 2015, he was paying some of his chefs less than the minimum wage. A chef showed the Guardian journalist Robert Booth evidence that chefs typically worked over 65 hours per week, only earning about £5.50 per hour. Work days began at 7am ending at 11.30pm, with only one hour break between lunch and dinner times, and sometimes as little as fifteen minutes for meal times.

Booth's Guardian article noted that in response to the exposé, "Roux said ... he was 'embarrassed and sorry' after the Guardian revealed he was paying chefs as little as £5.50 per hour when they were working 68 hours per week."

In December 2016, it was reported that Roux was keeping servers' tips and service charge. In light of this, he vowed to "scrap tips and service charge", instead including them in the cost of a meal.

== Personal life ==
Roux is married to Giselle, who worked in the restaurant business for many years and was the secretary at Le Gavroche. The couple have a daughter, Emily, who is also a chef. The Roux family lives in London.

Roux is a rugby fan and an honorary member of Harlequins and attends most matches. He also likes Manchester United and Wigan Warriors, and is a keen marathon runner, having run the London Marathon thirteen times to raise funds for the children's charity Visually Impaired Children Taking Action.

== Publications ==
- Le Gavroche Cookbook (2001), London: W&N (Orion), ISBN 978-0-304-35573-0
- The Marathon Chef: Food for Getting Fit (2003), London: W&N (Orion), ISBN 978-0-297-84309-2
- Le Gavroche Cookbook: Ten Recipes from One of the World's Great Restaurants (2005), London: Phoenix, ISBN 978-0-297-84392-4
- Matching Food And Wine: Classic And Not So Classic Combinations (2005), London: W&N (Orion), ISBN 978-0-297-84379-5
- Michel Roux: A Life in the Kitchen (2009), London: W&N (Orion), ISBN 978-0-297-84482-2
- Cooking with The Master Chef: Food For Your Family & Friends (2010), London: W&N (Orion), ISBN 978-0-297-86309-0
- The French Kitchen: 200 Recipes From the Master of French Cooking (2013), London: W&N (Orion), ISBN 978-0297867234
- Le Gavroche Cookbook (2017), London: W&N (Orion), ISBN 978-1409174400
- Les Abats (2017), London: W&N (Orion), ISBN 978-1409168959
- The French Revolution: 140 Classic Recipes made Fresh & Simple (2018), (Seven Dials), ISBN 978-1409169246
- Michel Roux at Home (2023), London: W&N (Orion), ISBN 978-1399610650
