= Bray, Berkshire =

Village in Berkshire, England

Coordinates: 51°30′25″N 0°42′00″W

Bray
- Village and civil parish
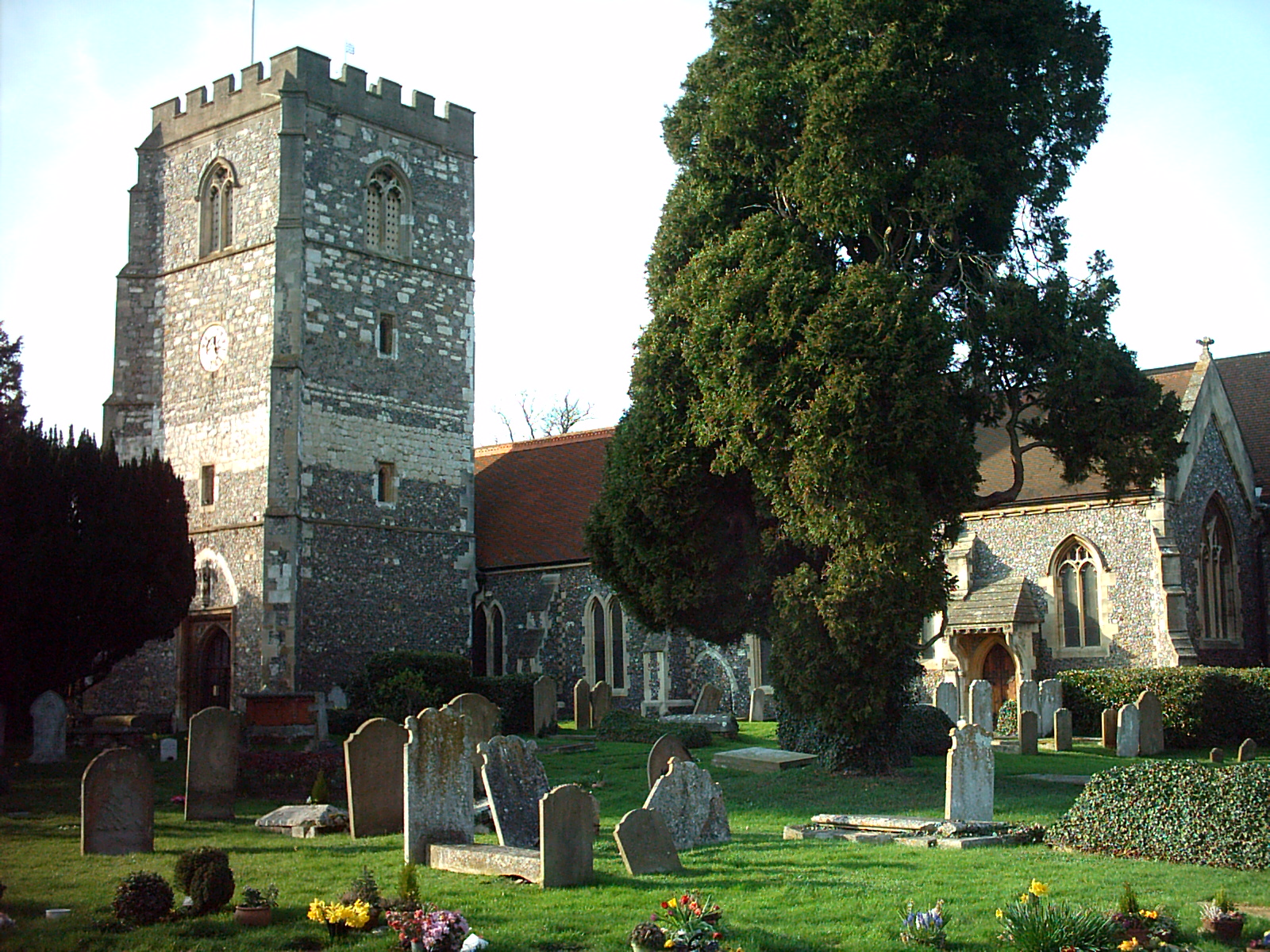
- St Michael's Church

- Location within Berkshire
- Population: 8,425 (2001); 9,110 (2011 Census including Burchett Green, Hawthorn Hill, Oakley Hill and Paley Street)
- OS grid reference: SU9079
- Civil parish: Bray
- Unitary authority: Windsor and Maidenhead
- Ceremonial county: Berkshire
- Region: South East
- Country: England
- Sovereign state: United Kingdom
- Post town: MAIDENHEAD
- Postcode district: SL6
- Dialling code: 01628
- Police: Thames Valley
- Fire: Royal Berkshire
- Ambulance: South Central
- UK Parliament: Maidenhead

Bray, occasionally Bray on Thames, is a village and civil parish in the Windsor and Maidenhead district, in the ceremonial county of Berkshire. It sits on the banks of the River Thames, to the southeast of Maidenhead with which it is contiguous. The village is mentioned in the comedic song "The Vicar of Bray". Bray contains two of the nine three-Michelin-starred restaurants in the United Kingdom and has several large business premises including Bray Studios at Water Oakley, where the first series of Hammer Horror films was produced.

== Geography ==
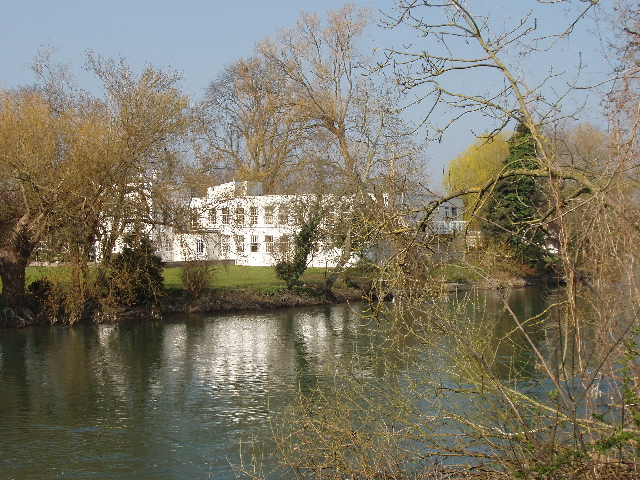
Monkey Island

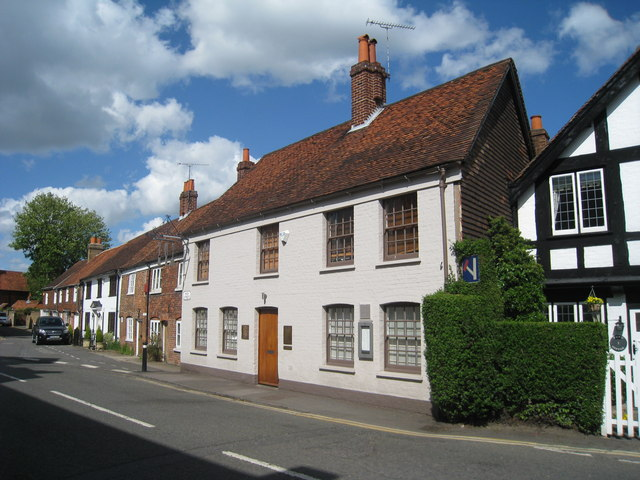
The Fat Duck

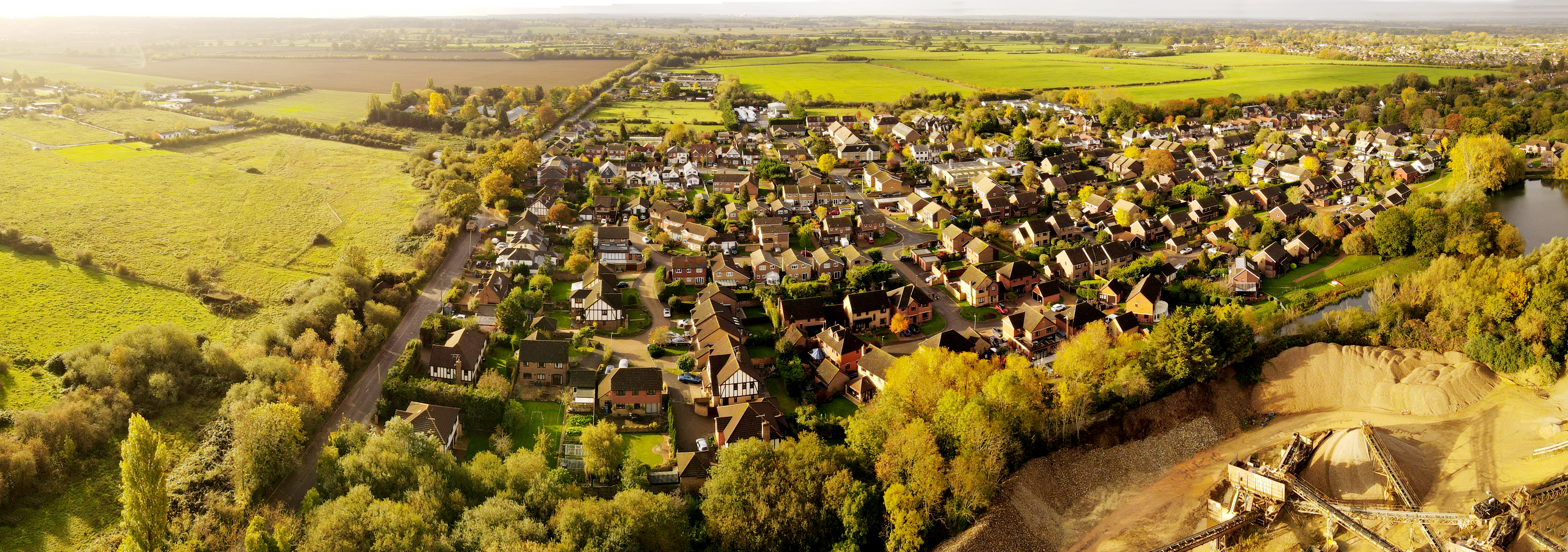
View of Bray Village, looking west.

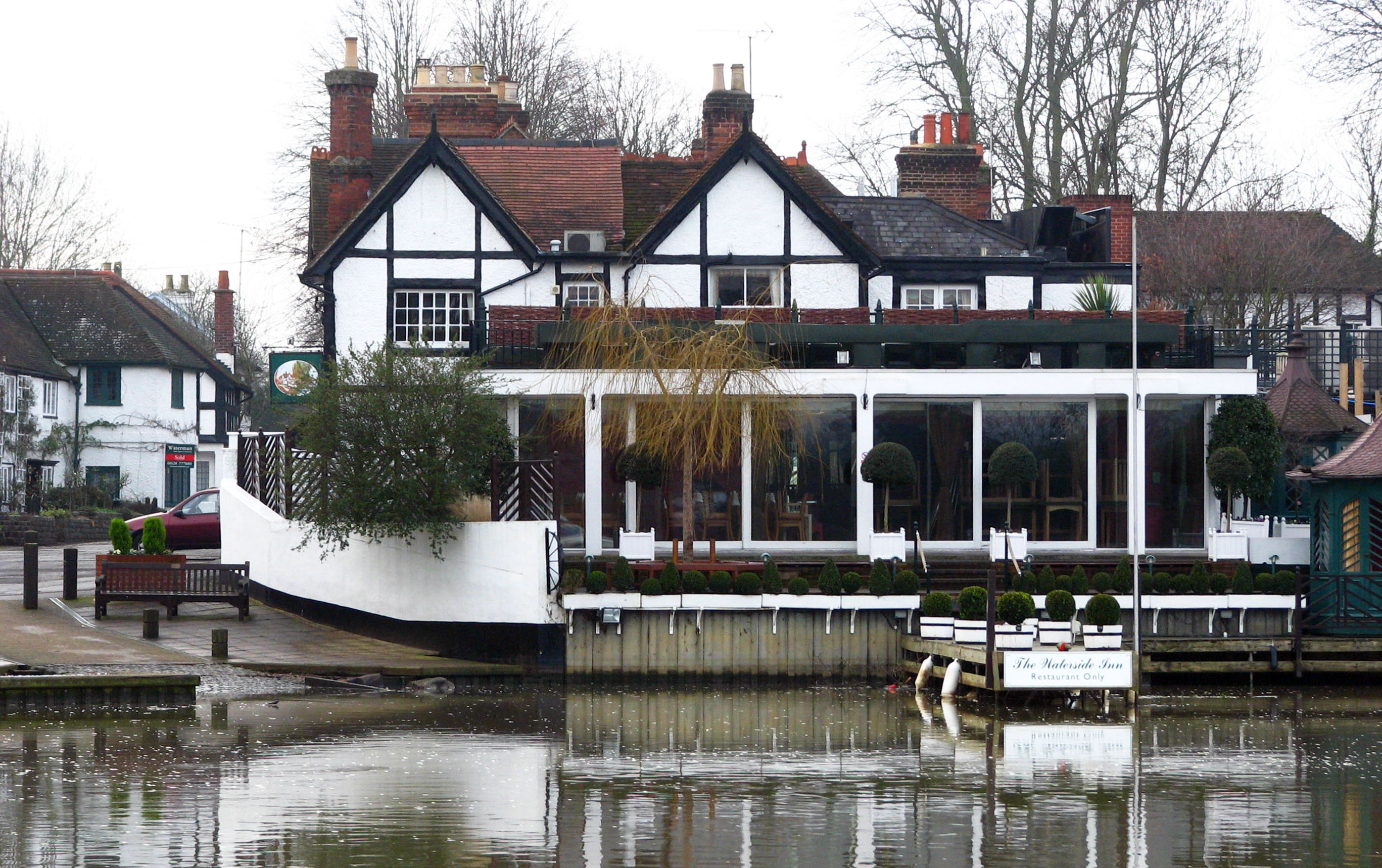
The Waterside Inn and River Thames

The civil parish of Bray is far larger than the village itself and includes a number of other villages and hamlets over an area of 24.98 km^{2} (9.64 sq mi). It had a population of 8,425 at the 2001 census, increasing to 9,110 at the 2011 census. Bray is a large parish, although its area has shrunk considerably since Maidenhead was detached. As well as the village, the parish contains a large number of villages and hamlets, which were originally scattered amongst the remains of the dense woodland of Windsor Forest that once covered the area. These include: Braywick, Holyport, Water Oakley, Oakley Green, Moneyrow Green, Stud Green, Foxley Green, Touchen End, Braywoodside and Fifield.

Exclusive houses on the river between Bray and Maidenhead Bridge have been referred to as Berkshire's 'Millionaires' row' in the national press. The flood risk of these houses has been decreased by the Jubilee River, a large drainage ditch dug between north Maidenhead and Datchet. Monkey Island, in the Thames, is associated with the 3rd Duke of Marlborough, and houses two structures that he built and furnished with paintings of monkeys, and the Grade I listed building, Monkey Island Hotel. The ecclesiastical parish shares the wide parish boundaries and is named Bray St Michael with Braywoodside.

== History ==
The first documented mention of Bray was as Brai in the Domesday Book of 1086.

== Governance ==
Since the redistribution of parliamentary boundaries, which took effect at the 2010 general election, Bray has been in Maidenhead. In terms of local government, it is in the Bray electoral ward of the Royal Borough of Windsor and Maidenhead.

== Amenities ==
=== Restaurants ===
Bray contains two of the eight three-Michelin-starred restaurants in the United Kingdom: The Fat Duck is a restaurant run by chef Heston Blumenthal in the centre of Bray. The restaurant opened in 1995, and has held a three-star Michelin Guide rating since 2004. In 2005, it was named the best restaurant in the world by Restaurant magazine and in 2008, 2009 and 2010, Best Restaurant in the UK, scoring a maximum 10 out of 10 in the Good Food Guide. The Waterside Inn was founded in 1972 by the brothers Michel and Albert Roux after their success with Le Gavroche. It is currently run by Michel's son, Alain and Frederic Poulette. The restaurant has three Michelin stars and in 2010 became the second restaurant outside France to retain all three stars for 25 years.

== Transport ==
Bray sits on the banks of the River Thames, one and a half miles (2.4 km) south of Maidenhead town centre and 5 miles (8 km) northwest of Windsor. The B3028 road runs through the centre of Bray, and the A308 Maidenhead to Windsor road runs between Bray and the adjoining village of Holyport. The M4 motorway junction 8/9 is approximately 1 mile (2 km) from Bray, and Maidenhead railway station is 1.5 miles (2.4 km) away in Maidenhead town centre.

== Notable buildings ==
=== Parish church ===
The Church of England parish church of St Michael was built in 1293, supposedly to replace a Saxon church at Water Oakley. It has a number of sculptures which may have come from the earlier church, including a damaged Sheela na Gig. It is best known to brass rubbers for housing the superb memorial brass of 1378 to Sir John Foxley, the Constable of Southampton Castle, and his two wives. One of the local cottages has a tunnel which it is believed leads to the church and served as an escape route for clergymen. The current Vicar of Bray is the Reverend Ainsley Swift.

=== Almshouses ===
The Jesus Hospital is a red-brick group of almhouses, founded in 1609 by William Goddard to house thirty-four of the aged poor of Bray and six of the Worshipful Company of Fishmongers, to which he belonged. A full-size effigy of Goddard stands over the entrance. Jesus Hospital is now run by The Donnington Hospital Trust having been transferred from The Fishmongers Company in 2010.

== Notable people ==
- Sylvia Anderson (1927–2016) – Co-creator of the Thunderbirds puppet series and voice of Lady Penelope
- Ian Bairnson (1953–2023) – Scottish musician
- Heston Blumenthal (born 1966) – The TV chef runs The Fat Duck and The Hinds Head Hotel restaurants in Bray
- Rolf Harris (1930–2023) – Australian artist, musician, TV presenter
- Carol Kirkwood (born 1962) – BBC weather presenter lives here
- George Mountbatten, 2nd Marquess of Milford Haven (1892–1938) – buried in Bray Cemetery
- Michael Parkinson (1935–2023) – journalist and TV presenter
- Laurie Holloway (1938-2025) – pianist and composer
- Tony Prince (born 1944) – disc jockey
- Regenbald - Chancellor of King Edward the Confessor and King William the Conqueror, was vicar of Bray
- Frank Schuster, music patron and friend of Elgar, at 'The Hut'
- Ernest Simpson (1897-1958) briefly resided at a hotel in Bray; this was cited in the divorce proceedings of Wallis Warfield Simpson, who went on to marry Edward, Duke of Windsor

== Literature ==
The village features as the home of the eponymous "The Vicar of Bray" in a satirical 18th-century song of that name. The titular character frequently changed his religious principles in order to remain in office throughout various reforming upheavals in the English church. The story was turned into an opera in 1882 and a film in 1937.

Edward Lear makes reference to Bray in More Nonsense Pictures, Rhymes, Botany, etc:

"There was an old person of Bray,

Who sang through the whole of the day
To his ducks and his pigs,
Whom he fed upon figs,

That valuable person of Bray."
