= Riccardo De Pra =

Italian chef

Riccardo De Pra is a Michelin Star Italian celebrity chef, and television personality.

== Biography ==
De Pra was born and raised in Alpago in the Province of Belluno to a De Pra family. He is the son of renowned Michelin-star chef Enzo De Pra and owner of the DOLADA group and restaurant, the oldest Michelin-star restaurants in Italy, located in Pieve D’Alpago, Veneto, Italy. Four generations of his family has run the Dolada for almost 100 years. Riccardo De Pra is known for his “Artistic Cuisine” that pairs classic ingredients with modern techniques.

== Career ==
He grew up in an environment rich in culinary influence, his grandfather is 3 Michelin-star and father is Michelin-star chef.

He started cooking at an early age and at 20 he moved to Japan to hone his cooking skills. In Japan he learned under the guidance of master chefs, Hirohisa Koyama and Hiroyuki Kanda, and got full hand at the Japanese cuisines. He has worked with master chefs such as Ferran Adrià, Albert Roux, Jean-Pierre Bruneau, and Gualtiero Marchesi during his career.

In his early twenties he worked for Roux Brothers in Britain.

He works as consultant for various food and table design companies and cultural institutions. He also works as lecturer at the University of Gastronomic Sciences in Pollenzo.

He is known as Italy's most expert in traditional cuisine and culture chef that is why he was chosen for the Clooney-Alamuddin wedding.

== Awards ==
- Michelin star (Dolada Restaurant) Pieve D’Alpago, Veneto, Italy

== Media appearance and philanthropy work ==
In 2019 he signed with LA7 for high altitude food comedy. In 2015 he was part of the Michelin-starred Belluno chefs who united for a noble cause: to raise funds for the purchase of a defibrillator to be installed in Piazza Tiziano in Pieve di Cadore. He recently appeared in a commercial of Bergader Italia aired at LA7.
