= Growing Underground =

Growing Underground was an urban farming technology company that was located in London, United Kingdom. The company claimed itself to be the world’s underground urban farm and sold its herbs and salads grown below the 33 meters under the streets of the London. Growing Underground was founded by Richard Ballard and Steven Dring, they partnered with chef Michel Roux Jr. They started the company to produce environmentally friendly, high quality vegetables and herbs.

The company was based in the World War II tunnels, below London's Northern Line underground rail link that was used as a bomb shelter during the World War. The founders claimed that their herbs, that were produced under the hydroponics system, used significantly less water in a pesticide-free environment.

The company was dissolved by Companies House on 14 November 2023.
