= Semur-en-Brionnais =

- Commune
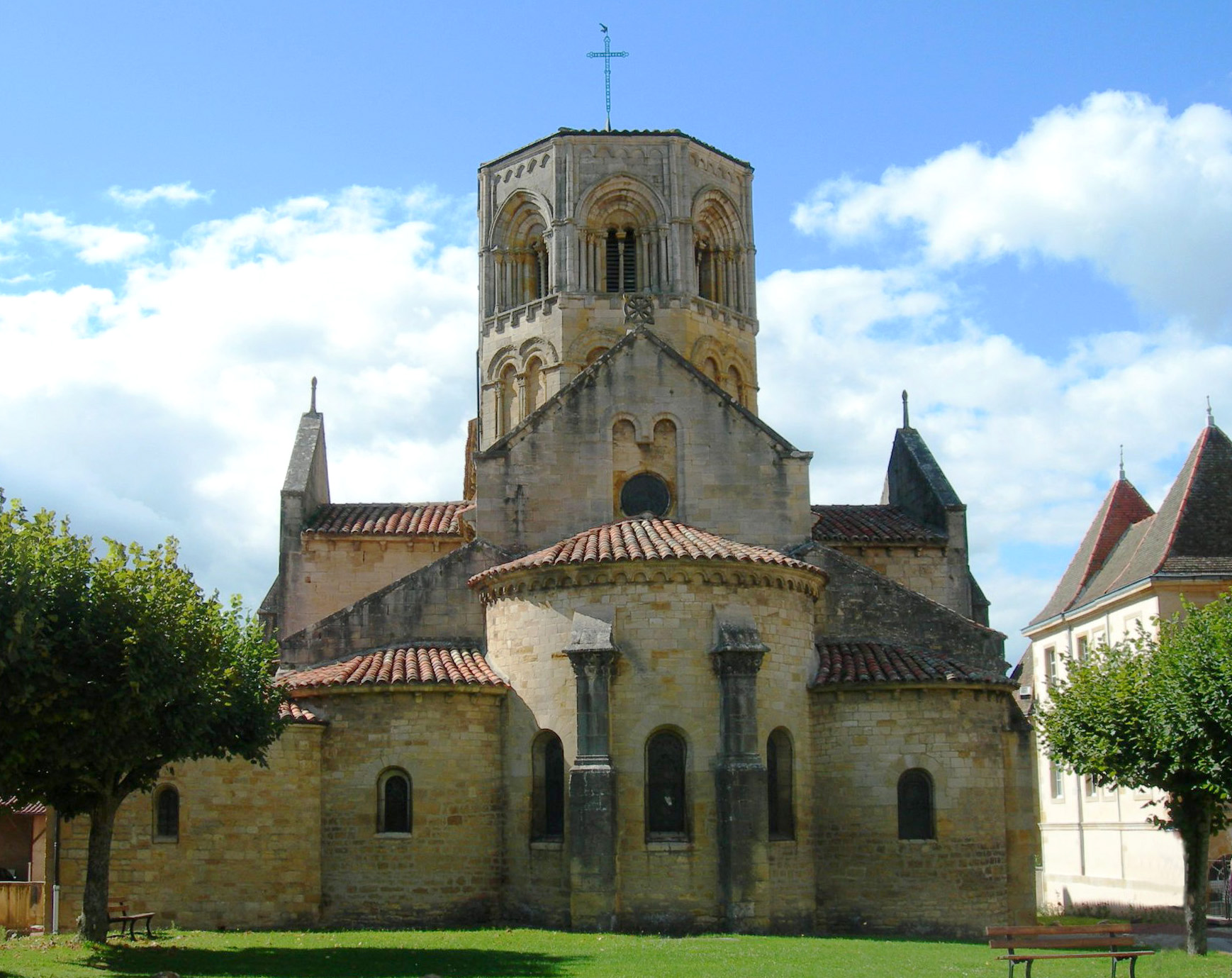
- Saint-Hilaire Church

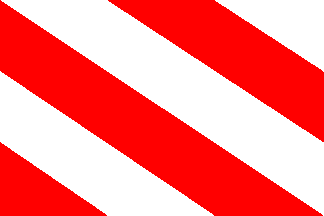
- Flag Coat of arms
- Location of Semur-en-Brionnais
- Location within France Location within Bourgogne-Franche-Comté
- Coordinates: 46°15′49″N 4°05′30″E
- Country: France
- Region: Bourgogne-Franche-Comté
- Department: Saône-et-Loire
- Arrondissement: Charolles
- Canton: Chauffailles

Government
  - Mayor (2020–2026): François Antarieu
- Area^{1}: 15.56 km^{2} (6.01 sq mi)
- Elevation: 396 m (1,299 ft)
- Highest elevation: 464 m (1,522 ft)
- Lowest elevation: 271 m (889 ft)
- Population (2023): 611
  - Density: 39.3/km^{2} (102/sq mi)
- Time zone: UTC+01:00 (CET)
  - Summer (DST): UTC+02:00 (CEST)
- INSEE/Postal code: 71510 /71110
- ^{1} French Land Register data, which excludes lakes, ponds, glaciers > 1 km^{2} (0.386 sq mi or 247 acres) and river estuaries.

Semur-en-Brionnais (French pronunciation: [səmyʁ ɑ̃ bʁijɔnɛ]) is a commune in the Saône-et-Loire department in the region of Bourgogne-Franche-Comté in eastern France. It is a member of Les Plus Beaux Villages de France (The Most Beautiful Villages of France) Association.

== Sights ==
- The oldest castle in Burgundy, Château Saint Hugues, dating from 9th century.
- The collegiale Saint Hilaire, the village church, dating from the 12th century.
- The chapel of St Martin la Vallée
- The Priory St Hugues, now the Convent of the Sisters of the Order of St. John
- The Chapter House. Built as a small monastery, this building later housed the village school and now contains, among other things, an exhibition of Romanesque Architecture in the Brionnais
- The village ramparts

Semur-en-Brionnais is the birthplace of

- Saint Hugues, the founder of Cluny Abbey, born 1024
- The chef Albert Roux born in October 1935. He owned Le Gavroche, the first restaurant in Britain to win three Michelin Stars.

== See also ==
- Communes of the Saône-et-Loire department
