= Alain Roux =

British-French chef and restaurateur

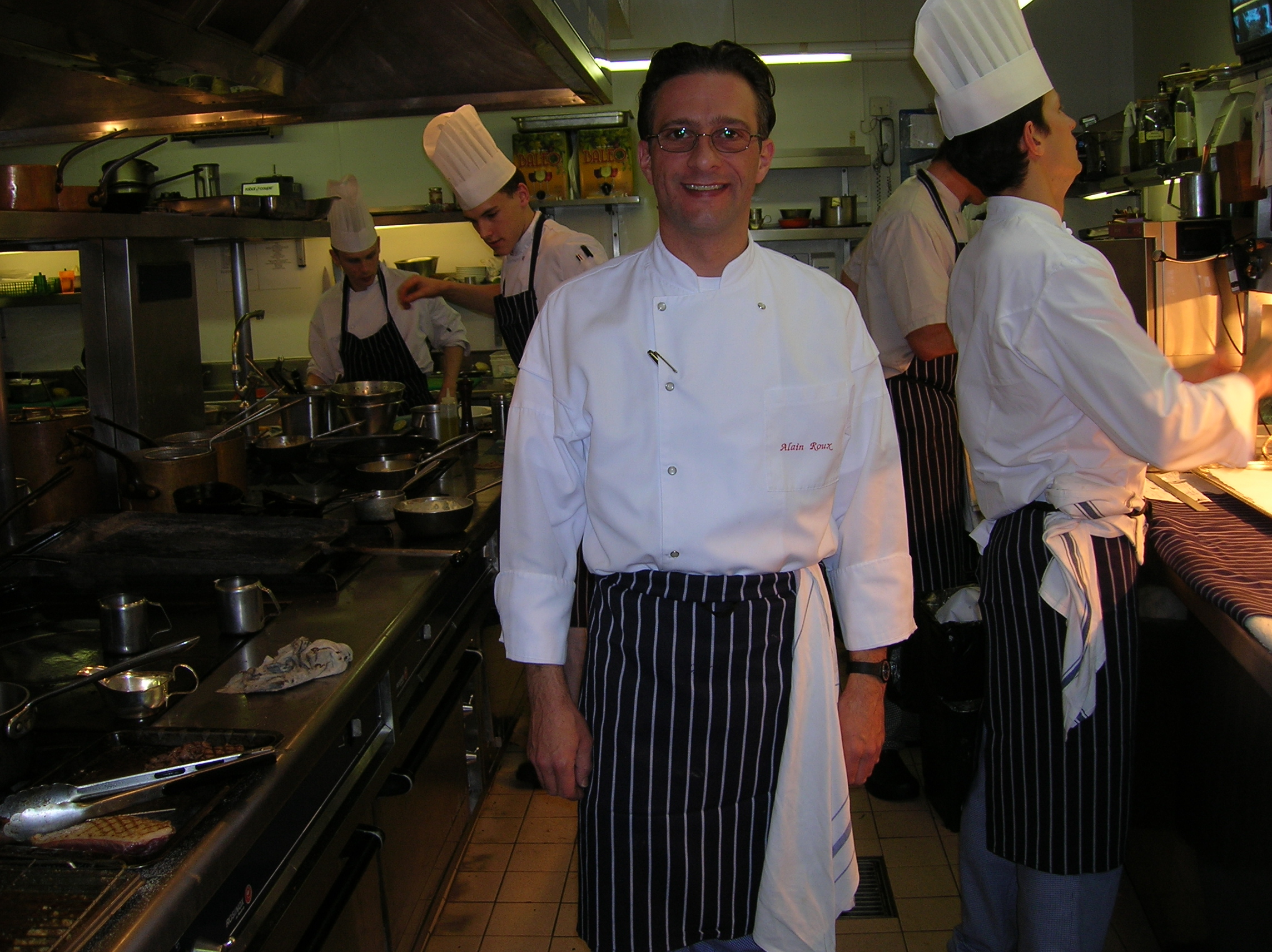
- Alain Roux, photographed in 2005
- Born: 27 March 1968 (age 58); London, England, United Kingdom
- Culinary career
- Cooking style: French cuisine
- Rating
- Michelin stars
- Current restaurants
- The Waterside Inn; Le Normandie (Bangkok)
- Television shows
- MasterChef: The Professionals; Saturday Kitchen

Alain Roux (born 27 March 1968), is a British chef. Since 2002 he has been chef-patron of The Waterside Inn, which has held three Michelin stars since 1985. He is a member of the Roux family, and son of Michel Roux.

== Career ==
Roux first decided to be a chef at the age of 14, something which his chef father, Michel Roux described as being equally "over the moon" and "disturbed" about. Alain spent eight years in France training at various restaurants. He was sent first to the Pâtisserie Millet in Paris in 1984 to undergo an apprenticeship as a pastry chef. He stayed there until 1986 when the apprenticeship was completed, and he moved around a number of different Michelin starred restaurants for the rest of his time in France, including three starred Restaurant Pic, Le Domaine d'Orvault, La Bonne Etape, Château de Montreuil and La Côte Saint-Jacques. Whilst in France, he served his period of military conscription as a chef at the Élysée Palace.

Roux moved back to his family's Waterside Inn in Bray, Berkshire, at the age of 23 in 1992 where he became a demi-chef de partie. In 1995, he became sous chef and he took over from his father as chef-patron of the Waterside Inn in 2002. Before this, in 2000, he joined Relais Desserts, an international society of pastry chefs.

Roux was chef-patron in 2010 when the Waterside Inn celebrated becoming the first restaurant outside France to hold three Michelin stars for 25 years. Alain is one of the judges of the Roux Scholarship, and has appeared as a celebrity chef judge on MasterChef: The Professionals. In 2011, he developed new menus for the Business Premier class onboard Eurostar trains.

Roux leads the 1-Michelin-starred French restaurant Le Normandie of the Mandarin Oriental in Bangkok, Thailand from 1 December 2021 onwards.

== Personal life ==
Alain is a member of the Roux family. He is the son of Michel Roux, nephew of Albert Roux and cousin to Albert's son, Michel Roux, Jr.
