= The Waterside Inn =

Restaurant in Berkshire, England

Coordinates: 51.5092°N 0.6990°W

Waterside Inn

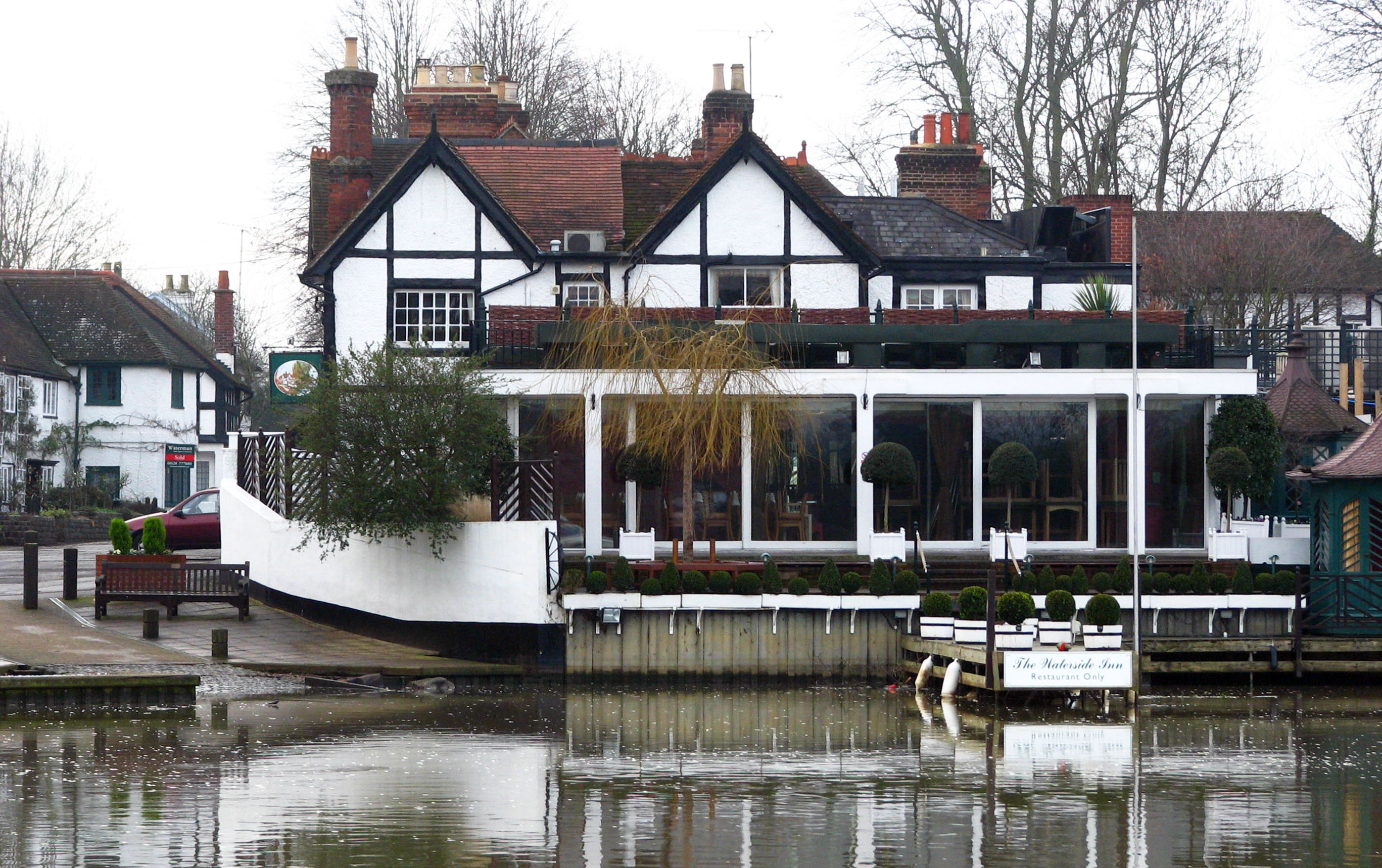
- Waterside Inn and River Thames, Bray
- Interactive map of Waterside Inn

Restaurant information
- Established: 1972; 54 years ago
- Owner: Alain Roux
- Head chef: Fabrice Uhryn
- Food type: French cuisine
- Dress code: Smart-casual
- Rating: (Michelin Guide); AA Rosettes (2026); (Good Food Guide)
- Location: Ferry Road, Bray, Berkshire, SL6 2AT, England
- Reservations: Essential
- Website: The Waterside Inn

The Waterside Inn, in Bray, Berkshire, England, is a restaurant founded by the brothers Michel and Albert Roux after the success of their London restaurant Le Gavroche. It is currently run by Michel's son, Alain. The restaurant has three Michelin stars, and in 2010 it became the first restaurant outside France to retain three stars for twenty-five years.

== Description ==
The Waterside Inn opened in 1972, following the Roux brothers' success at Le Gavroche. Pierre Koffmann was made the first head chef, having worked for Michel and Albert Roux at Le Gavroche. Koffmann remained as head chef until 1977 when he left to open his own restaurant, La Tante Claire. Michel Roux took over as head chef at the restaurant, slowly handing the reins over during the 2010s to his son and the current chef-patron, Alain Roux. Michel spoke of the handover, "The Waterside Inn has been my life but now my son runs it. What could be better? I am very proud of him. After all his name is above the door." Alain has added his own menu items to the restaurant while keeping Roux family classics like soufflé suissesse and tronçonnette de homard. Diego Masciaga has been the restaurant manager since 1988, and speaks of the two chefs highly, "Mr Michel was always there in the kitchen – morning, afternoon, night – with his big voice. Now it is the turn of Alain. Alain is a great man, too, but in his own way."

In addition to being a restaurant, the Waterside Inn has been slowly expanding the number of rooms available for overnight stays since 1992. The interiors were designed individually in a French style by Michel Roux's wife, Robyn.

In 2010, the Waterside Inn became the only restaurant outside France to retain three Michelin stars for 25 years. To celebrate, a party was held to which every Michelin starred chef in the UK was invited; 116 chefs attended. In addition, an offer was extended to local residents for lunch at 1985 prices, at a cost of £14.50 each instead of the normal £56.

== Reception ==
Matthew Fort reviewed The Waterside Inn for The Guardian in 2002, giving the restaurant a rating of eighteen out of twenty, and stated that the price of the meal was "money very well spent".

Matthew Norman, reviewing the Waterside Inn for The Daily Telegraph in 2010, praised the setting and the attentive service but criticised the value for money of the food served; he gave it a total of six out of ten, but described the cheese trolley as "spectacular". Also in 2010, John Walsh for The Independent visited the Waterside Inn shortly after it celebrated 25 years with three Michelin stars. While he also criticised the cost of some of the courses, saying "I knew it was expensive. Everybody knows that," he celebrated the quality of the food, describing his main course as "ambrosial" and "fabulous". He gave the restaurant four out of five each for food and ambiance, and five out of five for service.

The Waterside Inn placed eighteenth in The Good Food Guide's top 60 restaurants in the UK for 2011. Heston Blumenthal's nearby Bray based restaurant The Fat Duck placed first, while Le Gavroche placed fifteenth.

The Waterside Inn was placed first for both food and service in the Zagat survey on restaurants in London and Southeast England.

Hardens Survey Results 2023 awarded The Waterside Inn 5 / 5 for Food, Service and Ambience. "Perfection… and in a perfect waterside location". "An experience as serene as the Thames flowing past outside," wrote Ben McCormack in 2017.

== See also ==
- List of Michelin 3-star restaurants in the United Kingdom
