= Rachel Humphrey =

British chef

- Occupation: Chef
- Employer: Le Gavroche
- Awards: Michelin stars

Rachel Humphrey is a British chef. She was head chef at the two Michelin-starred London restaurant Le Gavroche.

She joined Le Gavroche as an apprentice on leaving school in 1996, and became first commis in 1998, chef de partie in 2003 and then sous chef in 2004. In 2008 she was promoted to head chef, the first female chef at the restaurant in its 40-year history.

Humphrey had a three-year break from the restaurant when she worked in the Royal Air Force catering corps.
