= Peter Barham =

British physicist (born 1950)

Peter Barham (born 1950) is emeritus professor of physics at the University of Bristol. He was visiting professor of Molecular Gastronomy at the University of Copenhagen, Denmark.

== Early life ==
Barham was born in 1950. He received his BSc from the University of Warwick, and his MSc and PhD from the University of Bristol.

== Career ==
Barham's research at the University of Bristol is concerned with polymer physics. He found ways to connect his research with his love of penguins, including the creation of silicon-based flipper bands which can be used for monitoring penguin populations. The silicone bands are designed to minimize the potential impact of carrying an external marking device and are currently in use on African penguins (Spheniscus demersus) at Bristol Zoo, UK and in the wild in South Africa. More recently, together with colleagues in the Computer Science Department at the University of Bristol, he has developed a computer vision system for the automatic recognition of African penguins. This system in 2008 was undergoing trials in South Africa.

Barham has contributed to the development of the new science of molecular gastronomy and has authored the book The Science of Cooking (ISBN 3-540-67466-7). He has collaborated with a number of chefs including Heston Blumenthal, the chef/owner of The Fat Duck and also a proponent of molecular gastronomy. He is editor-in-chief of a new journal, Flavour, which covers the science of molecular gastronomy. In 1994 he appeared as the Scientific Cook in a regular feature on Channel 4 food magazine series Food File, in which he explained some of the chemical mysteries that take place during the cooking process.

Barham contributes to the public understanding of science by giving public lectures on molecular gastronomy and penguin conservation biology. He has addressed audiences in both the UK and further afield. Titles of previous public lectures include "Ice cream delights", "Why do we like some foods and hate others?", "Kitchen disasters and how to fix them" and "A passion for penguins". He has also written articles for several national newspapers, makes frequent television and radio appearances, and was scientific advisor to the Discovery Channel series Kitchen Chemistry.

He won the Kelvin Medal and Prize in 2003.
