= Nico Ladenis =

Chef (1934–2023)

Nico Peter Ladenis
- Born: 22 April 1934; Tanganyika
- Died: 10 September 2023 (aged 89)
- Education: Prince of Wales School, Kenya and Hull University
- Spouse: Dinah-Jane Ladenis (m. 1963)
- Culinary career
- Ratings: Michelin stars (1995–1999); Good Food Guide 5 AA Rosettes Dr of Economics
- Previous restaurants: Chez Nico; Chez Nico, Dulwich; Chez Nico, Battersea; Chez Nico, Shinfield; Simply Nico, Rochester Row; Chez Nico, Great Portland Street; Nico Central, Great Portland Street; Chez Nico (Nico at 90) Grosvenor House Hotel, Park Lane; Incognico, Shaftesbury Avenue; Deca, Conduit Street
- Award won: Best Chef – 1988 Catey Awards Lifetime Achievement Award – 2015 The Catey Awards

Nico Ladenis (22 April 1934 – 10 September 2023) was a British chef. He was self-taught and was the first British chef to be awarded three Michelin Stars, for his restaurant Chez Nico in London.

Known for his fiery temper and his mantra "the customer is not always right", he taught a generation of British chefs who went on to run their own businesses, win Michelin stars and become household names, including Marco Pierre White.

In 1999, he asked to be removed from the Michelin Guide, due in part to prostate cancer and because of his disillusionment with the London restaurant scene. He retired to the south of France in 2000 and returned to England in 2011.

== Early life ==
Ladenis was born in Tanganyika, now Tanzania, on 22 April 1934, to Greek parents. After gaining a degree in Economics at Hull, he worked at The Sunday Times.

== Career ==
Ladenis was a self-taught chef, and did not attend any culinary schools. He opened Chez Nico in Dulwich in London in 1973, aged 39. In 1976 or 1977 he met fellow chef Michel Roux at a party, and Roux arranged for him to work for a week at the three Michelin star Moulin de Mougins under Roger Vergé.

In 1980 he moved Chez Nico to Queenstown Road in Battersea. It was awarded a Michelin star in 1981, and a second in 1984. In 1985 he moved Chez Nico to Reading, Berkshire, but the change was not a success. Within a year he moved to Rochester Row in Victoria, London, with a new name, Simply Nico. After three years he moved to a larger restaurant in Great Portland Street, reverting to Chez Nico again, with Simply Nico being retained as a bistro.

In 1989, he opened Simply Nico, a bistro in Pimlico, London.

In 1992, Ladenis was the first named chef to move his restaurant into a five-star hotel, as Rocco Forte recruited him to move Chez Nico to the Grosvenor House Hotel on Park Lane, first called Nico at Ninety, and later Chez Nico at Ninety Park Lane. Ladenis was ambitious to be awarded three Michelin stars, and his two existing stars transferred with the move. Chez Nico on Great Portland Street was converted into the bistro-style Nico Central.

In 1995 Chez Nico at 90 Park Lane was awarded three Michelin stars. Chez Nico, under Ladenis, was one of only seven restaurants in the UK (as of 2013) to have received the maximum score of ten out of ten by the Good Food Guide. He was the first British chef, and first self-taught chef to earn three Michelin stars.

In 1999, he asked Michelin to remove him from the guide, giving up his three Michelin stars. He said that "Working in a three-star restaurant is very restrictive and people do not want to eat very expensive food. You cannot fool around in the restaurant if you have three stars and I want to make it more relaxed." He later admitted that this was due in part from being disillusioned with the restaurant scene in London, but also because he had been diagnosed with prostate cancer the month before speaking to the Michelin reviewers.

He subsequently opened more restaurants: in 2000, Incognico opened on Shaftesbury Avenue, and in 2002, Deca opened on Conduit street. He decided to step back from running restaurants in 2003, and retire fully from the business. His two daughters remained involved in both businesses.

Ladenis was known for his uncompromising personality, insisiting, for example, that diners could not have a second gin and tonic, or add salt to his food.

He appeared on television in Take Six Cooks (1985), and wrote two semi-autobiographical books, My Gastronomy (1987) and Nico (1996).

== Personal life ==
Ladenis was married to Dinah-Jane Ladenis, with whom he had two daughters, Isabella and Natasha. He died on 10 September 2023, at the age of 89.

== Published works ==
- Ladenis, Nico; Crompton-Batt, Alan (1987). My Gastronomy. London: Ebury. ISBN 9780852236826.
- Ladenis, Nico; Brigdale, Martin (1996). Nico. London: Macmillan. ISBN 9780333651773.

== See also ==
- List of three Michelin starred restaurants in the United Kingdom
