= De Pra =

de Pra is an Italian surname. Notable people with the surname include:

- Giovanni De Prà (1900–1979), Italian footballer
- Leonídio de Pra, Brazilian volleyball player
- Ruben De Pra (born 1980), Italian pair skater
- Tommaso de Pra (born 1938), Italian cyclist
