= Braywoodside =

Coordinates: 51.47°N 00.74°W

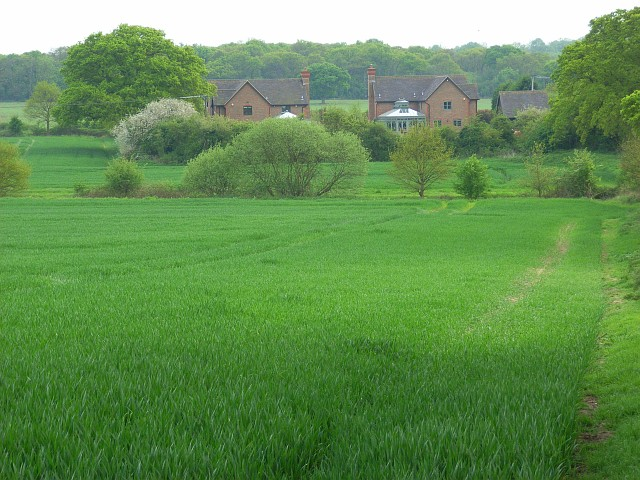

- Location within Berkshire
- OS grid reference: SU8775
- Shire county: Berkshire
- Region: South East
- Country: England
- Sovereign state: United Kingdom
- Police: Thames Valley
- Fire: Royal Berkshire
- Ambulance: South Central

Braywoodside is a hamlet in Berkshire, in the south east of England. It is located roughly 10 km west-south-west of Slough and 15 km east of Reading.
