= Michel Roux =

French chef (1941–2020)

Michel Roux OBE
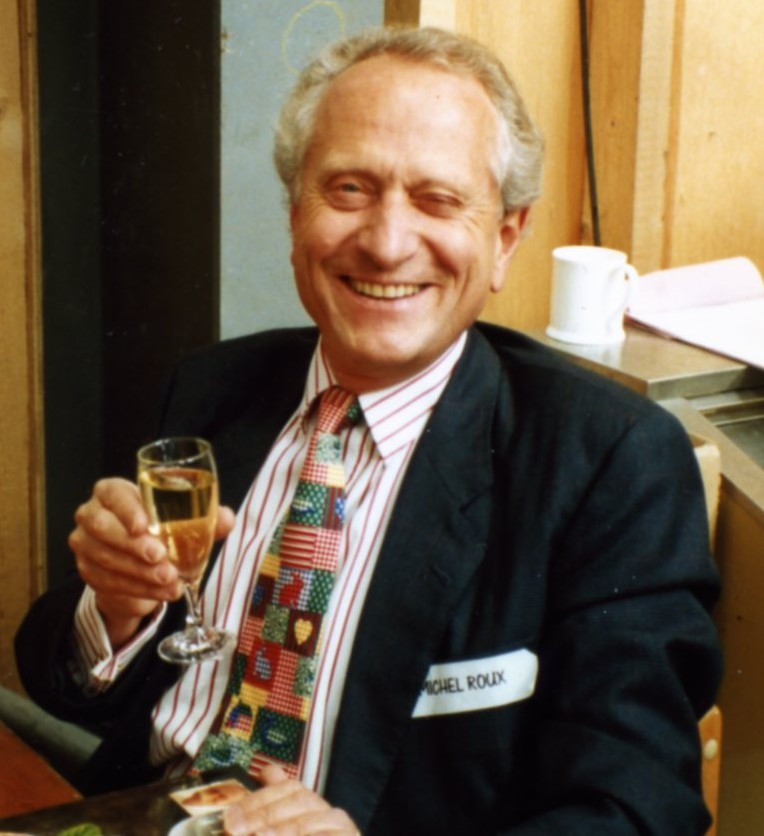
- Michel Roux in 2008
- Born: 19 April 1941; Charolles, France
- Died: 11 March 2020 (aged 78); Bray, Berkshire, England
- Culinary career
- Rating
- Michelin stars (1974–2002)
- Previous restaurants
- Le Gavroche (formerly); The Waterside Inn
- Awardss
- Meilleur Ouvrier de France; 2008 Lifetime Achievement award by Tatler; 2011 Lifetime Achievement award by The Observer Food Monthly

Michel Roux, OBE ([mi.ʃɛl ʁu]; 19 April 1941 – 11 March 2020), also known as Michel Roux Snr., was a French chef and restaurateur working in Britain. Along with his brother Albert, he opened Le Gavroche, which subsequently became the first three Michelin starred restaurant in Britain and The Waterside Inn, which was the first restaurant outside France to hold three stars for 25 years.

Roux followed his brother into becoming a pastry chef and again to England in order to open their first restaurant. The pair were described as the "godfathers of modern restaurant cuisine in the UK" and Roux was inducted into several French orders, and received two lifetime achievement awards from different publications. He was decorated during a period of National Service for France during the 1960s.

He founded the Roux Brothers Scholarship along with Albert in 1984, and worked as a consultant for companies such as British Airways and Celebrity Cruises over the years. After he and his brother split the business in 1986, Roux took the Waterside Inn, which he handed over to his son, Alain, in 2002. He remained an active food writer and appeared on television shows such as Saturday Kitchen, MasterChef and the Roux family-centric series The Roux Legacy, and on the Woman's Hour programme on BBC Radio 4.

== Early life ==
Michel Roux was born on 19 April 1941 in Charolles, Saône-et-Loire, in a room above his grandfather's charcuterie (a delicatessen specializing in meat products). He moved to Paris with his family after the war, where his father Michel set up his own charcuterie, after not taking over the family business in Charolles. His father gambled away all of the family's money, and the shop was closed to prevent it from going bankrupt. By the time Roux turned ten, his father had left the family and was not heard from again.

== Career ==
Roux's older brother Albert had already become a patissier (pastry chef), and Roux followed him into this field at the age of fourteen. He became an apprentice to Camille Loyal in Belleville, working seventy-hour weeks. Roux's tasks at the pâtisserie included making up to sixty galettes des rois over the course of three days for Epiphany. Albert found Roux further employment as his apprenticeship ended. As Albert was working at the British Embassy in Paris as a sous chef, Roux joined him there as the pastry chef for the Embassy. He moved on from there to become a chef in Philippe de Rothschild's service, while Albert moved to England to work there.

Between 1960 and 1962, Roux served his French National Service. He was first stationed at the Palace of Versailles, but was later posted overseas in Béchar, Algeria. He was awarded the Médaille commémorative des opérations de sécurité et de maintien de l'ordre en Afrique du Nord.

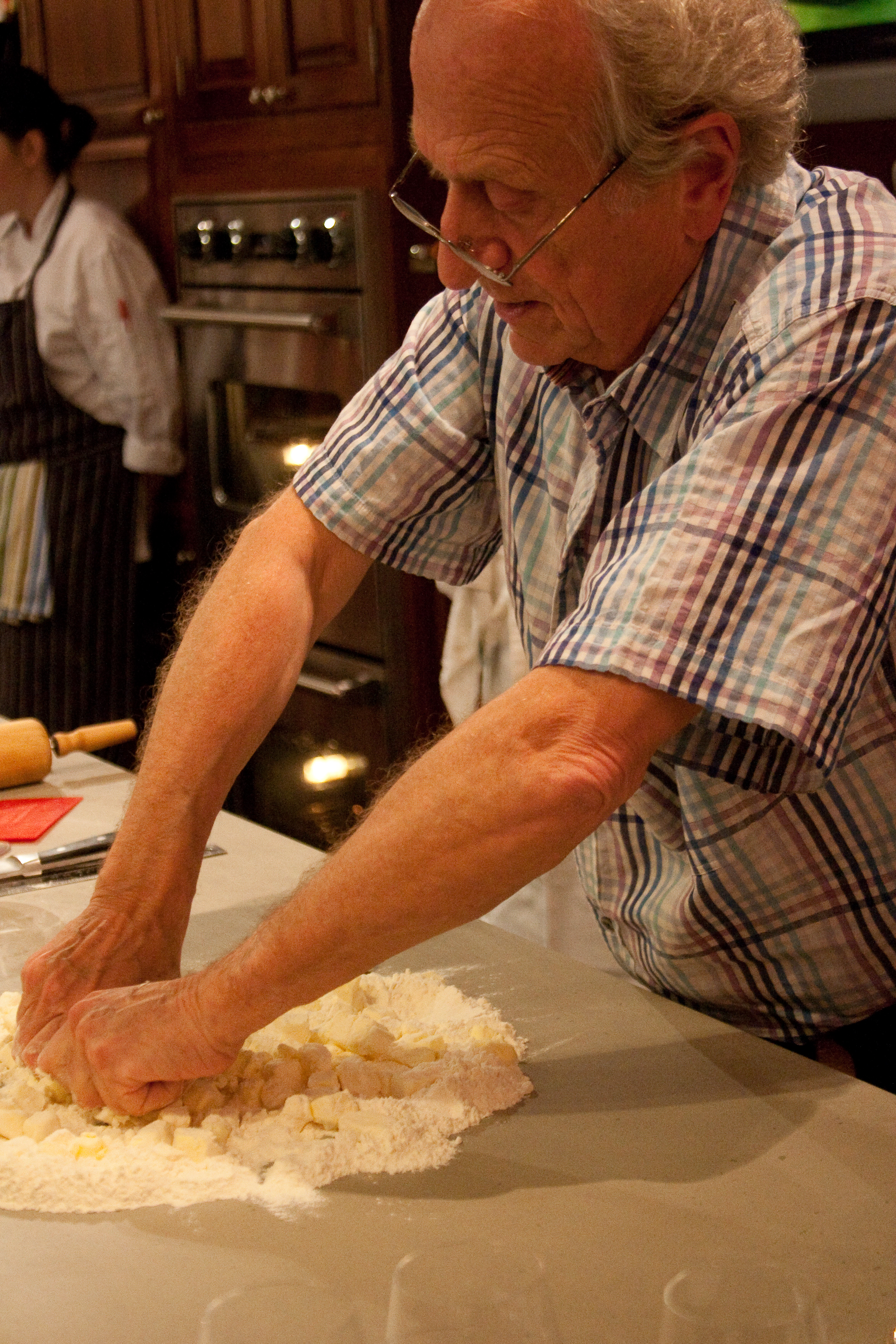
Michel Roux making pastry in 2009

Roux nearly decided to give up cooking to become an opera singer, but instead followed Albert to London, despite not being able to speak English. He would later recall that people thought he was mad for travelling there as he considered the state of English cooking at the time to be horrific.

In 1967 the brothers opened their first restaurant, Le Gavroche at Lower Sloane Street in London. The opening party was attended by celebrities such as Charlie Chaplin and Ava Gardner. For the following week, Chaplin was reportedly shuttled across London so he could eat there. In 1972 the brothers opened a second restaurant, the Waterside Inn, in Bray, Berkshire, and launched a catering business.

In 1974, when Michelin stars were first awarded in the UK, Le Gavroche and the Waterside Inn both won a star, and when a number of restaurants won two Michelin stars for the first time in 1977, both Roux restaurants were among them. Le Gavroche moved to a new location in Mayfair in 1982, and in the same year became the first restaurant in the UK to be awarded three Michelin stars. The same rating for the Waterside Inn followed in 1985, but Le Gavroche went back down to two stars in 1993 and did not regain the three star level before it closed in 2024. In 2010, the Waterside Inn became the first restaurant outside France to have held three Michelin stars for a period of 25 years.

The Roux Brothers Scholarship was founded by Albert and Michel in 1984. It is an annual competition to select a single chef to send out as an apprentice. The first winner was Andrew Fairlie, and winners over the years have included Sat Bains (1999) and Simon Hulstone (2003).

In 1986 the brothers split their restaurant business between them, following a disagreement over the direction that their joint business should take; Albert took Le Gavroche, while Michel took the Waterside Inn. Michel was a consultant to British Airways for twenty years between 1983 and 2003, and for Celebrity Cruises since 1990. The Roux brothers' catering company was purchased by Compass Group in 1993, with Albert retained as a consultant.

Roux's son, Alain Roux, currently runs the Waterside Inn in Bray, having taken over as chef patron in 2002.

In July 2008, Roux announced that he would move permanently to Crans-Montana, Switzerland, citing concerns about the state of public safety in Britain. He also owned a vineyard and house on the Cote d'Azur in France.

Since 2014, Roux worked with British baking company, Bakedin, as a consultant reviewing and approving all recipes.

=== Television and radio work ===
Roux spoke out against entertainment-type cooking shows such as the 1990s cooking gameshow Can't Cook, Won't Cook, saying that "The way these people handle food is a crime. They don't even know the basics. Little attention is paid to detail. Instead, they are intent on having a giggle and a joke. They can do this without involving food." The Roux brothers had a BBC television show, At Home with the Roux Brothers, in the early eighties.

Together with his brother Albert, Roux appeared on BBC Radio 4's Desert Island Discs on 26 October 1986. The Good Food channel aired a five-part series entitled The Roux Legacy in January 2012, which featured both brothers, along with their sons Michel Jr. and Alain. Roux had also appeared as a guest judge on MasterChef: The Professionals, alongside his nephew Michel Jr, and on Saturday Kitchen alongside his son Alain.

=== Legacy and awards ===
Roux and his brother have been called the "godfathers of modern restaurant cuisine in the UK" by hospitality industry magazine Caterer and Hotelkeeper, while The Observer Food Monthly described him as "perhaps the finest pastry chef this country has ever had" when he was awarded their Lifetime Achievement Award in 2011. Roux had previously won the Lifetime Achievement award from Tatler magazine in 2008. In a poll of UK chefs carried out by Caterer and Hotelkeeper magazine in 2003, the Roux brothers were voted the most influential chefs in the country, and in 2004 Michel Roux was voted the AA Chef's Chef.

Many well known chefs have been trained by one or the other of the Roux brothers, with Michel estimating in 2010 that "Half of the Michelin star-holders in Britain come from either my brother's kitchen or my kitchen". These have included Gordon Ramsay, Marco Pierre White, and Pierre Koffman.

Roux was awarded the Meilleur Ouvrier de France en Pâtisserie in 1976. He was a member of several orders in France. In 1987, he was inducted into the National Order of Merit as a Chevalier (knight), and into the Mérite agricole as an officer. In 1990 he was made a Chevalier in the Ordre des Arts et des Lettres, and in 2004 the Legion of Honour followed. Outside France he was made an honorary Officer of the Order of the British Empire in 2002, and was made an honorary Doctor of Culinary Arts by the University of Rhode Island in the same year.

== Personal life ==
Michel Roux was the brother of Albert Roux. Michel had a son named Alain Roux, while Albert's son is also named Michel Roux. When Alain was ten years old, Roux and his wife divorced, with his wife taking British-born Alain and his two sisters to France. Alain would visit during the school holidays and work with Michel in the kitchens, and decided at the age of fourteen that he wanted to become a chef like his father.

Roux met his second wife (1984–2017) Robyn Joyce, after being set up on a blind date with her by former apprentice Leigh Stone-Herbert in Sydney, Australia. The relationship has been credited with opening the door to Australian chefs being trained by the Roux brothers.

Michel Roux died on the night of 11 March 2020, at home in Bray, Berkshire, aged 78, following a history of idiopathic pulmonary fibrosis.
