= The Good Food Guide =

UK restaurant guidebook (1952-)

The Good Food Guide is a guide to the best restaurants, pubs and cafés in Great Britain. The first edition was published in 1952 and covered the years 1951–1952. Initially published every two years, the Good Food Guide was then published annually from 1969 until 2021.

Over its existence in print, the number of establishments included in the Good Food Guide steadily rose, from 484 entries in its first volume, to 750 in the 1961 volume, 1200 in the 1971 volume, and from 2010 until the end of its existence in print, around 1300 entries.

In October 2021, Adam Hyman purchased The Good Food Guide for an undisclosed sum from Waitrose & Partners. The Guide was relaunched in 2022 as a digital product. The Guide will no longer be published annually in print but will instead be published in an app that will be continuously updated with new Guide entries along with a The Good Food Guide Weekly digital newsletter, location guides and Club perks and offers.

According to the organisation, all reviews are based on the huge volume of feedback received from readers and this, together with anonymous expert inspections, ensures that every entry is assessed afresh. Every inspected meal is paid for, and Readers of the Guide are still actively encouraged to submit their reviews, via the Good Food Guide website, which are then considered for prospective inclusion in the Guide .

Some guidebooks prior to Postgate's were, like his, based on readers' recommendations, but in the early 1950s, the majority were made up of the opinions of experts, or taste arbiters. They decided for their readership which restaurants were good and which were not. Other guidebooks might have advertised themselves as "independent", but many included listings for restaurants that paid them.

Elizabeth Carter was appointed as editor of The Good Food Guide in November 2007. She has been an active restaurant inspector and contributor to the Guide since the 1990s, and has extensive experience in restaurant-related publishing and media. Previous roles have included editor of Les Routiers UK and Ireland Guide (2002–2004) and editor of the AA Restaurant Guide (1997–2000).

Chloë Hamilton works alongside Carter as co-editor.

== History ==
The Good Food Guide was first compiled by Raymond Postgate in 1951–52. Prior to that work, Postgate had published in Leader Magazine (23 April 1949) an article entitled "Society for the Prevention of Cruelty to Food", stating that his new-found society rose from his frustration with the "horrifying things" he had witnessed in restaurants and urging interested readers to send him restaurant recommendations. When Hulton, the Leader's publisher, abruptly closed the magazine down, Postgate worked with Lilliput to continue his project. In November 1950, a neophyte version of what would become the Good Food Guide was published. This list of fifteen recommended restaurants was prefaced by Postgate's article, "The Good Food Club: Rules for Eating Out", including Rule One: "Read the menu outside. If there is no menu outside, don't go in." Postgate's aims were simple, among them, "to raise the standard of cooking in Britain" and "to do ourselves all a bit of good by making our holidays, travels and evenings-out in due course more enjoyable". Following the success of The Good Food Club, readers' reports were compiled and the first Good Food Guide was published. It included 484 restaurants, hotels, and pubs. One of the original compilers was food writer Margaret Costa who would become the regular Sunday Times food columnist. Upon his retirement from the Good Food Guide in 1970, Postgate estimated that he had dealt with some 40,000 reader recommendations.

Several editors have been associated with the Good Food Guide. Christopher Driver was appointed successor to Postgate in 1969-1970 and served in that role until 1982. Driver's approach to editorship was characterized by Tom Jaine, himself a former editor of the Good Food Guide (1990–1994), as "galvanic". Driver "excoriated" many of the restaurants that he and Good Food Club members nonetheless deemed worthy of inclusion in the Guide, but which still suffered from "cupidity and the vain pretensions of their customers." Furthermore, Jaine continued, Driver "included with gusto and near-apostolic zeal Indian, Chinese and other ethnic restaurants which had hitherto been thought beneath a linen-and-crystal gourmand's notice." Higher-end restaurateurs and chefs, including Kenneth Bell at Thornbury Castle, Gloucestershire, took offence at the Good Food Guide under Driver's editorship, launching letters to The Times as well as meeting with the Consumers' Association to whom Postgate had sold the Good Food Guide in 1963. Driver also initiated an on-going campaign to discourage restaurants from allowing patrons to smoke.

Good Food Guide volumes published under Driver's leadership moved away from simply telling people "of places where a passable meal could be obtained." He instituted what were called "distinctions", reserved for establishments thought to offer outstanding food, or hospitality, or a distinguished wine cellar. The pestle-and-mortar distinction, to be bestowed "grudgingly" by Good Food Club members, denoted "unusual skill, imagination, and energy in a chef or team. . . . Sound materials, judicious menu-building, and a good technique should be looked for, as well as indefinable, indispensable flair, and a high degree of reliability." The Roux Brothers' Waterside Inn in Bray received such a distinction multiple times. The tureen distinction was "confined to hotels" and signified "a well-kept table" and a place where it was a pleasure to spend more than one night. Many establishments sported both the mortar-and-pestle and the tureen distinctions throughout Driver's tenure, including Miller Howe Hotel in Windermere, Cumbria, and Ballymaloe House in Shanagarry, County Cork, Ireland. A wine bottle denoted "a wine list and service out of the usual run." The Bell Inn in Aston Clinton, Buckinghamshire, routinely received this distinction.

Drew Smith assumed the editorship in 1982 (his first edited edition appeared in 1983) and brought on board Jeremy Round as his assistant editor, replacing Aileen Hall. Round went on to become the first food columnist at the Independent, and during his tenure at the Good Food Guide, fellow Guide writer, David Mabey, credited Round with helping develop the Guide into "a mouthpiece for serious gastronomic debate."

Characterizing Smith as "a lean, lanky, feisty chap," Mabey noted several campaigns that Smith launched, all of which had a significant effect on the British restaurant scene, British gastronomy, and diners. The first was the "No Mortgage Needed" campaign launched in the 1983 Good Food Guide to address the high cost of dining out. Many restaurants responded to Smith's challenge to "provide a complete meal under £10," and many new addresses ended up in the 1984 Good Food Guide as a result.

Smith was particularly critical of many so-called French restaurants, noted Michael Bateman, then food writer for the Independent on Sunday. Bateman quoted Smith as saying, "'You would recognize them by their use of frozen food, inept service, poor sauces, a big bill.'" Partly in response, Smith inaugurated the "Real Food" campaign in the 1984 Good Food Guide. Restaurants that allowed the Guide a list of their suppliers to authenticate that indeed, the kitchen was free of processed, frozen, and ersatz products, were awarded a "Real Food" badge. In the 1985 Good Food Guide, Smith verified that the "Real Food" badge and campaign had been successful, that restaurateurs who had achieved the "Real Food" badge were actively "encouraging the growth of small food businesses in the area."

Smith's essay in the 1987 Good Food Guide, "The British Revival," identified "a real gleam of hope. Our national cooking," Smith observed, "has reasserted itself. A new mood is evident. In the last year we have stumbled across what seems to be a phenomenon." Smith went on to write that initially, this phenomenon "appeared to take the shape of a resurgence of regional cooking in the Lake District, but it was soon apparent that other restaurants throughout the country had adopted the tack." Labelling this new style "Modern British Cooking" or MBC, Smith identified five themes: Emphasis on regionality and sourcing ingredients as locally as possible to guarantee freshness and to also reward local craftsmen such as butchers for their product; the market itself, with menus reflecting what was best at local markets from day to day and hence, a focus on seasonality; relishes and spices that "revive the heart of British cooking" and that have traditionally been "used almost like punctuation, to give emphasis to the centerpiece," such as a joint of meat; the garden, especially the importance of an abundant use of vegetables and to a degree fruit that illustrate "the great wealth of British horticulture"; and finally, the tradition, especially chefs' attention to "traditional British puddings," from Sussex pond to jam roly-poly, treacle tart, clootie pudding, and Atholl brose. Equally important were chefs who called attention to a new generation of farmhouse cheesemakers who revived the production of languishing British cheeses. Smith went on to stress that he and his staff "do not claim to have invented this modern British cooking, only to be recording it." Twelve London restaurants, fifty-six English restaurants outside of London, thirteen Scottish, and six Welsh restaurants were given the "Modern British Cooking" badge.

Smith likewise "had the courage" as the next Good Food Guide editor, Tom Jaine, characterized it, to create a new classification system, "marking each restaurant out of 20, thus providing rapid guidance and a national league table." No restaurant warranted a 20, the highest mark possible, and many fell within the 9-13 range. Those scored between 16 and 17, the highest awarded, were regarded by the editor and inspectors "as the best in Britain." In 1987, only three restaurants were scored 17 out of 20: Le Gavroche and Tante Claire in London, and Le Manoir aux Quat' Saisons, in Great Milton, Oxfordshire.

Tom Jaine assumed the Good Food Guide editorship from 1989 to 1994. As he pointed out in the Introduction to the Good Food Guide 1990, he was the first editor who was not by profession a writer or journalist, but rather, had spent much of his life involved, "through family or profession, in restaurants." He was the stepson of George Perry-Smith, whose restaurant, Hole in the Wall, Bath, achieved long-standing fame. From there, Jaine went into partnership with Perry-Smith, Heather Crosbie, and Joyce Molyneux after the sale of Hole in the Wall in 1972. Jaine established with Chef Molyneux another claimed restaurant, the Carved Angel, in Dartmouth, Devon, in 1974. He remained in partnership with Molyneux until 1984 when he left the restaurant industry to focus on writing.

As Good Food Guide editor, Jaine established a new marking system, moving from the 20-point model to a 1-5 model instead. "Reducing the total from 20 to five intentionally broadens the bounds of each mark," Jaine explained in the 1990 edition. "We reckon that the reader needs straightfoward guidance that is not based too much on nit-picking and the reading of the entrails." A score of 5 signified the rarest restaurants, deemed simply "the best. These may excite debate, not as to whether the cooking is good, but whether it is better than their peers," while a 1 signified "Competent cooking. Restaurants that achieve a satisfactory standard, endorsed by readers as worthy of the Guide. For the 1990 volume, only seven restaurants achieved a mark 5 for cooking: L'Arlequin, Chez Nico, Le Gavroche, and Tante Claire in London; Le Manoir aux Quat' Saisons, and L'Ortolan, in England, and Peat Inn in Fife, Scotland.

In August 2013, the guide was purchased and published by Waitrose & Partners. The guide continued to be published annually, until May 2021.

== Awards ==
In 2024, the Guide changed the format away from a ranked list, celebrating its newly formatted Good Food Guide Awards on the 30th of Jan 2024.

This new format highlighted restaurants that are both World Class and Exceptional, a reflection of the new scoring system of the Guide

The event also awarded seven unique categories of awards

- Most Exciting Food Destination
- Best Front Row Seat
- Drinks List of the Year
- Best Farm to Table
- Chef to Watch
- Best New Restaurant
- Restaurant of the Year

== Publications ==
- Recipes from Restaurants in the Good Food Guide (Raymond Postgate and Margaret Costa, Hodder & Stoughton, Ltd., 1968)
- The Good Food Guide Dinner Party Book (Hilary Fawcett and Jeanne Strang, 1971)
- The Good Food Guide Second Dinner Party Book (Hilary Fawcett, Hodder & Stoughton Ltd, 1979)
- Good Cook's Guide: More Recipes from Restaurants in the "Good Food Guide" (1974)
- The Good Food Guide: Recipes - Celebrating 60 of the UK's Best Chefs and Restaurants (Which? Books, 2010) ISBN 978-1-84490-106-7
- The Good Food Guide 2016 (Waitrose, 2015) ISBN 978-0953798339
