= AA Rosette =

Culinary excellence award in Ireland and the United Kingdom

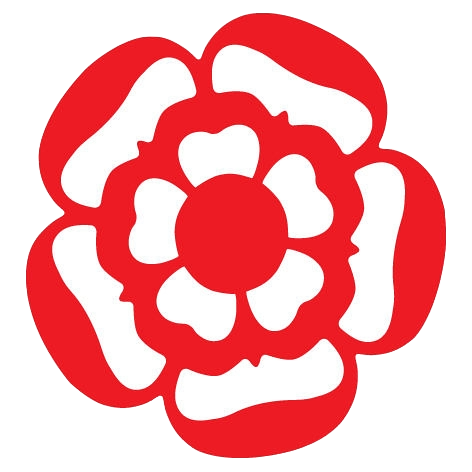
- Awarded for: Culinary excellence
- Country: United Kingdom; Ireland
- Presented by: The AA
- First award: 1955; 71 years ago
- Website: www.ratedtrips.com/aa-rosette-restaurants

The AA Rosette is an award recognising culinary excellence in the United Kingdom and Ireland. Restaurants are rated from one to five rosettes. Rosettes are awarded only to the top 10% of restaurants; those awarded four rosettes or above are, according to the AA, amongst the best restaurants nationwide. Each year's rosette ratings are published in the annual AA Restaurant Guide and, since 2020, the Rated ZESTY Trips website.

== History ==
The AA had launched a ranking system for hotels, based on the star system used for brandy, in 1908. Rosettes were first awarded in the 1956 AA Handbook (published in 1955). Initially, they were used only for hotels with catering facilities, which had become more prevalent following the end of rationing.

In January 1967 the AA would publish its Guide to Hotels and Restaurants in Great Britain and Ireland, launching its restaurant rating scheme. The rosette symbols would be used in this guide. The first awards were intended solely to inform consumers; in time they would also become an accolade amongst professional chefs. The AA hotel classification would work with the British Hotel, Restaurant and Catering Association.

In 1972, two hotels and six restaurants (four were in London) received the three-rosette award. Of London's AA five-star hotels, only the restaurant at The Connaught had the three-rosette award. One of the four London restaurants with three rosettes was Le Gavroche. The 1972 guide called for 'more adventurous regional cooking'. Outside of London there were four three-rosette establishments, including The Box Tree and the Grand Central Hotel in Glasgow, with head chef Jean-Maurice Cottet.

In 1992 the classification was increased to five rosettes from the previous maximum of three. In 2020, the AA introduced charges for one- and two- rosette restaurants to be assessed and to be featured in the Guide.

== Controversies ==
In July 2002, Gordon Ramsay publicly accused the AA of bowing to pressure from the company director, Roger Wood, to reduce the number of AA rosettes granted to Pétrus after Wood allegedly argued with Ramsay's restaurant manager over seating arrangements. The editor of the AA Restaurant Guide, Simon Wright, resigned following the dispute, citing Wood's intervention as the cause. Ramsay sought a court injunction in an attempt to prevent the publication of the 2003 edition of the guide. Pétrus was granted the maximum five rosettes in September 2002.

Michael Winner was a prominent critic of the AA rosette scheme, calling the award "worth less than a used plastic cup". The 2002 edition was subject to a negative review from Andrew Lloyd Webber, who said that it had "directed me to one of the worst meals I have ever eaten".

== See also ==
- Michelin Guide
- The World's 50 Best Restaurants
