= Albert Roux =

French chef and restaurateur (1935–2021)

Albert Roux OBE
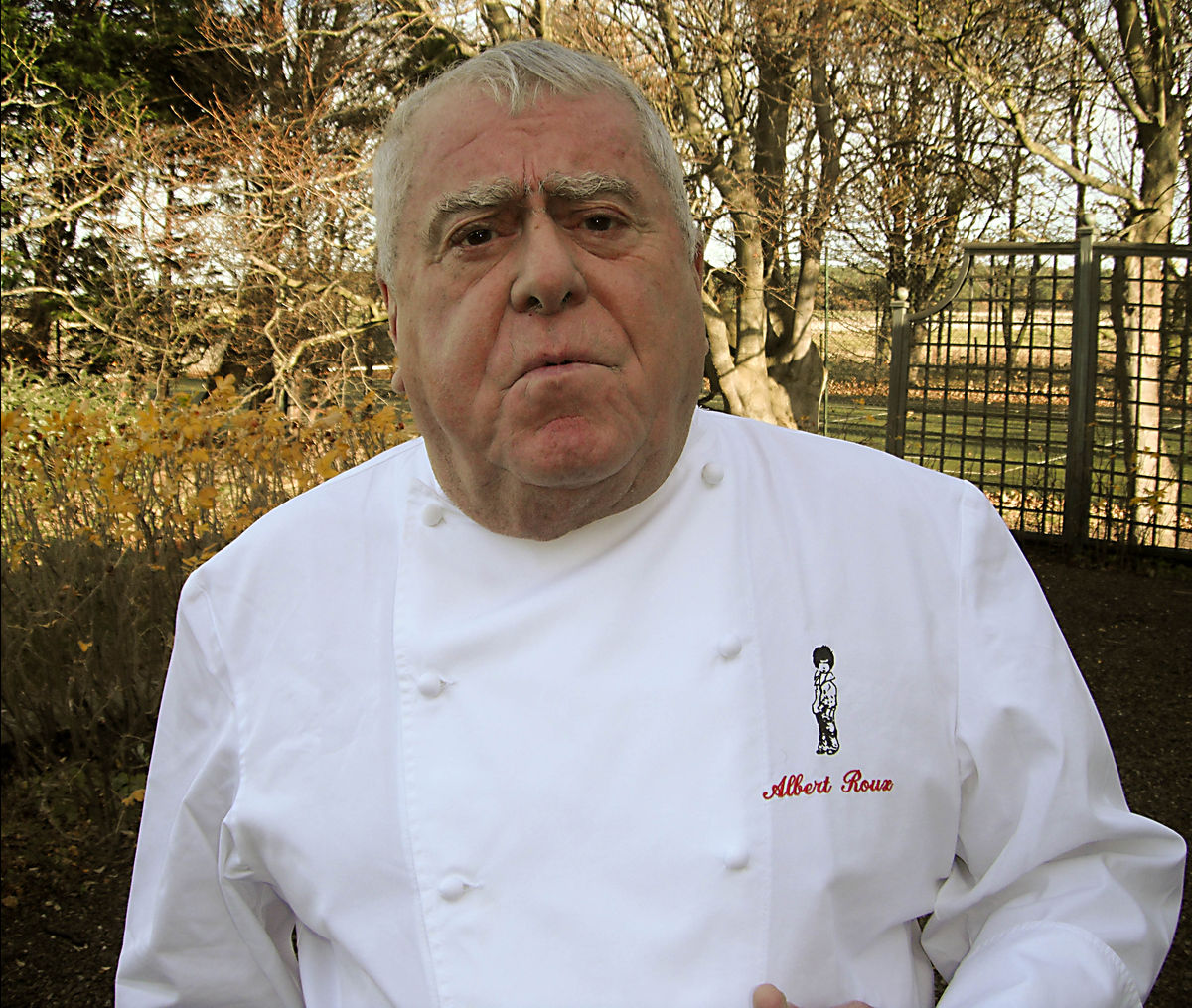
- Roux in 2010
- Born: 8 October 1935; Semur-en-Brionnais, France
- Died: 4 January 2021 (aged 85); London, England
- Spouses: Monique Merle (m. 1959; div. 2001) Cheryl Smith (m. 2006; div. 2016) Maria Rodrigues (m. 2018)
- Children: 2; Michel Roux Jr and Danielle
- Culinary career
- Cooking style: French
- Rating
- Michelin stars (1982–1993)
- Previous restaurants
- Le Gavroche, Mayfair, London (formerly); Waterside Inn, Bray, Berkshire
- Awards
- Legion d'Honneur; Order of the British Empire; Papal knighthood (KFO)
- Website: www.albertroux.co.uk

Albert Henri Roux OBE (8 October 1935 – 4 January 2021) was a French restaurateur and chef. He and his brother Michel operated Le Gavroche in London's Mayfair, the first restaurant in the UK to gain three Michelin stars. He helped train a series of chefs that went on to win Michelin stars, and his son, Michel Roux, Jr., continued to run Le Gavroche until January 2024.

== Early life ==
Albert Roux was born in the village of Semur-en-Brionnais in Saône-et-Loire, France on 8 October 1935. He was the son of a charcutier. His brother, Michel Roux, was born in 1941. Upon leaving school, he initially intended to train as a priest at the age of 14. However, he decided that the role was not suited to him, sought other employment, and instead trained as a chef. His godfather worked as a chef for Wallis, Duchess of Windsor, and arranged for Roux, at the age of 18, to be employed working for Nancy Astor, Viscountess Astor.

== Career ==
In one notable incident whilst employed by the Viscountess, Roux managed to jam oeufs en cocotte in a dumbwaiter which were due to go to Harold Macmillan, then Prime Minister of the United Kingdom. Otherwise, his apprenticeship at Cliveden went without problems. He moved on to work at the British Embassy in Paris and became a private chef for Sir Charles Clore. He was then called up by the French Armed Forces to serve his military service in Algeria, where he cooked on occasion for the officer's mess. Once he left the military, he worked as a sous chef at the British Embassy in Paris, before returning to the UK to become private chef to Major Peter Cazalet where he worked for eight years.

In 1967, Roux and his younger brother Michel opened Le Gavroche, on Lower Sloane Street in London. It became the first restaurant in Britain to win a Michelin star, the first to win two, and, in 1982, the first to win three. The restaurant became a favourite of Queen Elizabeth The Queen Mother. In 1984, he and Michel set up the Roux Scholarship to enable up and coming chefs to get a start in the industry. During his time in the kitchen, he trained several chefs who went on to gain Michelin stars of their own, including Gordon Ramsay, Marco Pierre White, Pierre Koffmann, Riccardo De Pra, and Sat Bains. Roux spoke highly of Gordon Ramsay: "I recognised straightaway that Gordon would go a long way."

Of all his protégés, Roux no longer got on with White, and said in an interview in 2010, "We don't talk. No, he is a truly talented man – and a man who used to call me his godfather – but he has got a chip on his shoulder". White mentions the rift in his autobiography, but says, "Albert employing me was without doubt one of the defining moments of my life. I won't hear a word said against [the Roux brothers]."

Roux continued to run a series of restaurants around the world, through his company, founded by his wife Cheryl, Chez Roux Limited, including one at the Greywalls Hotel in Muirfield, Gullane, and Roux at the Landau, situated in the Langham Hotel, as well as Roux at Parliament Square and multiple Chez Roux restaurants. He collaborated with his son, Michel Roux Jr., to open co-branded restaurants at Inverlochy Castle and Crossbasket Castle in Blantyre in Scotland. He no longer chased Michelin stars for his restaurants, but instead sought to "...recreate the kind of restaurant I remember from my home town, offering good and honest country cooking. The kind of place you can go to eat without ringing the bank for permission." In 2006, Albert and Michel Roux were jointly given the Lifetime Achievement Award by S. Pellegrino World's 50 Best Restaurants.

== Personal life ==
Roux had a love of fishing, and had travelled around the world to pursue his hobby, but was particularly fond of Scotland.

In 1959, aged 24, Roux married Monique, his childhood sweetheart, and they had two children, Michel Roux Jr and Danielle. The marriage was dissolved in 2001.

In 2016, Roux was divorced by his second wife, Cheryl Smith. He married his third wife, Maria Rodrigues, in January 2018, three years after meeting her. Rodrigues is a partner in a professional services firm. His son Michel Roux, Jr. ran Le Gavroche, which had two Michelin stars, until January 2024.

Roux died in London on 4 January 2021, following a long illness.

== Honours and awards ==
Roux was awarded an OBE in 2002 and was appointed a Chevalier of the Légion d'Honneur in 2005.

- Officier of the Order of Legion of Honour
- Officier of the Order of Agricultural Merit (1987)
- Officier of the Order of the British Empire (2002)
