= Le Gavroche =

Restaurant in London, England

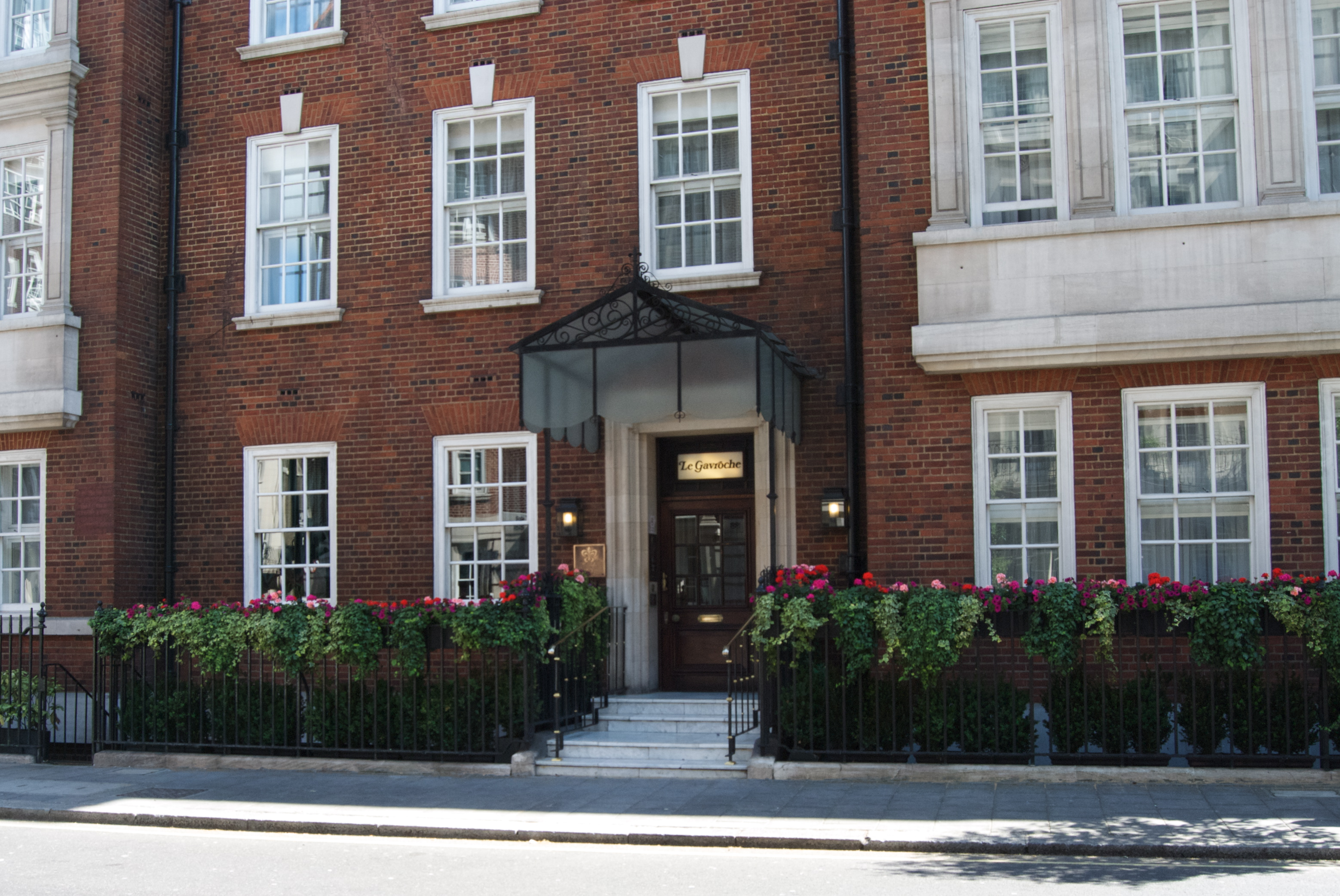
- Interactive map of Le Gavroche

Restaurant information
- Established: April 1967
- Closed: 13 January 2024
- Owner: Michel Roux Jr.
- Head chef: Rachel Humphrey
- Food type: French cuisine
- Dress code: Smart
- Rating: (Michelin Guide); AA Rosettes
- Location: Upper Brook Street, London, W1K 7QR, United Kingdom
- Coordinates: 51°30′39″N 0°9′18″W
- Website: Official website

Le Gavroche (The Urchin) was a restaurant at 43 Upper Brook Street in Mayfair, London. It was opened in April 1967 by Michel and Albert Roux at 61 Lower Sloane Street, its premises until 1981. Albert's son Michel Roux Jr was the chef patron from 1991 until its closure in 2024. It was the first restaurant in the UK to be awarded three Michelin stars, which it held from 1982 to 1993.

The restaurant offered classical French food, although some dishes were more modern. Notable dishes included the Soufflé Suissesse (cheese soufflé baked on double cream); Le Caneton Gavroche (whole poached duck in a light consommé served with three sauces for two); and Omelette Rothschild. Its name came from the character Gavroche in Victor Hugo's Les Misérables.

In August 2023, Michel Roux Jr. announced that the restaurant would close at the end of its lease in January 2024, after over 56 years of business. The restaurant's final day of trading was on 13 January 2024.

== Overview ==
Chefs who worked in the kitchen of Le Gavroche included Marco Pierre White, Gordon Ramsay, Marcus Wareing, Pierre Koffmann, Bryn Williams, Michael Smith and Monica Galetti.

Albert's son Michel Roux Jr was the chef patron. having taken over the running of the kitchen in 1991. Under his stewardship, Le Gavroche was consistently placed in Restaurant magazine's Top 50. The Executive Chef was Rachel Humphrey and the Head Chef was Gaetano Farucci.

Le Gavroche was listed in the Guinness Book of World Records as having served the most expensive meal per head when three diners spent $20,945 on one meal (including cigars, spirits, and six bottles of wine costing $19,248) in September 1997.

In 2008, Silvano Giraldin, Le Gavroche's General Manager, retired after 37 years working there. He remained as one of Le Gavroche's directors.

David Coulson, runner-up in the 2010 BBC series MasterChef: The Professionals, accepted an offer of employment from Michel Roux Jr during the final stages of the show and was to start work with Le Gavroche as chef de partie in January 2011.

In November 2016, it emerged that some employees were being paid as little as £5.50 per hour. This was considerably less than the 2016 legal UK minimum wage of £7.20 per hour. Since then, the restaurant became committed to review and increase wages and the time for which the restaurant was closed to reduce staff working hours. The restaurant was also further disadvantaging staff by treating the service charge as restaurant revenue, and not a tip, as it is commonly believed to be.

In August 2023, Michel Roux Jr announced that the restaurant would close at the end of its current lease in January 2024. The restaurant closed on 13 January 2024.

== Ratings ==
In 1974, Le Gavroche was the first restaurant in the UK to receive a Michelin star and was the first British restaurant to receive two Michelin stars, this in 1977 while still at Lower Sloane Street. In 1982, after a move to the larger Upper Brook Street premises, it became the first restaurant in the UK to be awarded three stars. It retained this rating until 1993 when it lost a star as the Chef Patron formally changed from Albert Roux to his son. Regarding the loss of the third star Michel Roux Jr said "Certainly I would love three stars. I believe in the system and the recognition would be wonderful. But I am not cooking that style of food. There are dishes that are worthy of it but my style really doesn't suit that status."

== See also ==
- List of French restaurants
- List of Michelin starred restaurants
- List of restaurants in London
- Jesse Dunford Wood, a chef at the Le Gavroche
- Chef Thierry Laborde
