= Roux Scholarship =

- Awarded for: To find new talent in the catering industry.
- Country: United Kingdom
- Presented by: Alain Roux and Michel Roux Jr
- Reward: Three months at a three Michelin star restaurant or a Bespoke Training Package
- First award: 1984
- Website: Official website

Television/radio coverage
- Network: Good Food (2012); Watch (2013)

The Roux Scholarship is a cooking competition for young chefs in the UK. Set up by the brothers Michel and Albert Roux, and now run by their sons Alain Roux and Michel Roux Jr. It was first run in 1984 with Andrew Fairlie being named the first winner. It has since been run on an annual basis, with winners either undertaking a three-month placement in a Michelin-starred restaurant, or receiving a bespoke training programme.

== History ==
Colin Page, Director of Marketing, Diners Club UK, conceived the idea of the chef's scholarship with Michel Roux in 1983. The sponsorship of the scholarship was finally agreed between Nick Rowe of Diners Club that same year following a luncheon at Roux's Waterside Inn when it was agreed the Roux brothers could front a scholarship for up and coming chefs and that Rowe's credit card company would back it financially. Michel spoke to his brother Albert the following day, who said that Michel could lead on it. Michel thought it would be a good way for young chefs to gain experience in French restaurants, which were not open to employing British chefs at the time. The competition was formerly known as the Roux Diners Club Scholarship.

Each entrant must enter a paper application, which are then reviewed and broken down into regional competitions. Each regional winner goes through to the final, where there is one Scholar named. Entrants are limited to chefs who are working in full-time employment. Chefs are not limited to applying on one occasion; both Simon Hulstone and Mark Birchall competed on four occasions before winning. The winner of the competition is allowed to choose a three Michelin starred restaurant to cook in for three months. More recently, an alternative Bespoke Roux Scholarship programme has been offered instead of the stage, where the winner works with The Roux Scholarship team to help develop their culinary skills via short term courses and international trips.

The Current Judging panel for the competition consists of Michel Roux, Jr. and Alain Roux as the chairmen, alongside Brian Turner as Honorary Patron as well as chefs Emily Roux, Angela Hartnett, Rachel Humphrey, James Martin, former Roux Scholarship finalist Lisa Goodwin-Allen as well as former Roux Scholarship winners André Garrett, Sat Bains, Simon Hulstone, Adam Smith & Mark Birchall.

From 2016, Each year's national final has also featured an honorary president of the judging committee. The chefs are selected on the basis of their goal to help young chefs advance their careers.

Year	Honorary president
2026	Mauro Colagreco
2025	Elena Arzak
2024	Thomas Keller
2023	Michel Troisgros and César Troisgros
2022	Hélène Darroze
2020/2021	Björn Frantzén
2019	Peter Gilmore
2018	Michel Guérard
2017	Anne-Sophie Pic
2016	Pierre Gagnaire

Former Judges include Albert Roux, Michel Roux, Victor Ceserani, Peter Kromberg, Heston Blumenthal, Rick Stein, Gary Rhodes, Clare Smyth, David Nicholls, former Roux Scholar Steve Love and inaugural Roux Scholarship winner Andrew Fairlie.

The 2020 Competition was postponed due to the COVID-19 pandemic, with a combined 2020/2021 competition taking place in September and October, 2021.

From 2023 onwards, rather than a pre-selected dish that the finalists would be given on the day, the 6 contenders are allowed to prepare their own version of a French dish using set Key ingredients.

Highlights of the competition, including a Masterclass of the National Final dish(s) by Michel Jr. and Alain are featured on The Roux Scholarship YouTube Channel.

2025 Winner Craig Johnston became the first chef to have won both the Roux Scholarship, and Masterchef: The Professionals, having won the competition in 2017.

== Past winners ==
Year	Winner	Restaurant/Package chosen	Ref
2026	Harrison Brockington		
2025	Craig Johnston		
2024	Karol Ploch	Bespoke Package	
2023	April Lily Partridge	Bespoke Package (Australia & Mexico)	
2022	Jonathan Ferguson	The French Laundry	
2020/21	Oli Williamson	Zén	
2019	Spencer Metzger	Frantzén	
2018	Martin Carabott	Eleven Madison Park	
2017	Luke Selby	Ryugin	
2016	Harry Guy	Saison	
2015	Ian Scaramuzza	Benu	
2014	Tom Barnes	Hof van Cleve	
2013	Paul O'Neill	Pierre Gagnaire	
2012	Adam Smith	Le Meurice	
2011	Mark Birchall	El Celler de Can Roca	
2010	Kenneth Culhane	Jean Georges	
2009	Hrishikesh Desai	French Laundry	
2008	Dan Cox	Can Fabes	
2007	Armand Sablon	Auberge de l'Ill	
2006	Pravin Sharma	Les Maisons de Bricourt	
2005	Matthew Tomkinson	Les Prés d'Eugénie	
2004	Andrew Jones	Restaurant Bras	
2003	Simon Hulstone	Marin Berasategui	
2002	André Garrett	Restaurant Guy Savoy	
2001	Steve Drake	L'Auberge de l'Eridan	
2000	Frederick Forster	Restaurant Pierre Gagnaire	
1999	Sat Bains	Le Jardin de Sens	
1998	Patrick Thompson	Restaurant Alain Senderens	
1997	Stephen Love	Restaurant Alain Ducasse	
1996	Trevor Blyth	La Côte Saint-Jacques	
1995	Chris Colmer	Troisgros	
1994	Mercy Fenton	La Résidence de la Côte-d’Or	
1993	Jonathan Harrison	Le Louis XV	
1992	James Carberry	George Blanc	
1991	Eugene Callaghan	Lameloise à Chagny en Bourgogne	
1990	Scott Hessel	Aubergine	
1989	Martin Hadden	Maison Pic	
1988	Ricky Perrin	Restaurant Bocuse	
1987	Richard Stuart	L'Espérance	
1986	Rene Pauvert	Au Crocodile; Restaurant Joël Robuchon	
1985	John Murray	Moulin de Mougins	
1984	Andrew Fairlie	Les Prés d’Eugenie	
