= El Bulli Foundation =

Spanish foundation

El Bulli Foundation, often stylized as elBullifoundation is a project of Ferran Adrià, Juli Soler and Albert Adrià that continues El Bulli's legacy subsequent to its closure as a restaurant. The Foundation's headquarters are in Barcelona, Spain, but one of the exhibit spaces is in Girona, Spain within El Bulli 1846, on the site of the restaurant.

== LA Bulligrafía ==
LA Bulligrafía, sometimes spelled, LABulligrafía is an archive of the restaurant's history and significance in shaping fine dining from its beginnings as a beach bar in 1962 through its closure. When completed, the archive will consist of information available online and a physical museum sometimes referred to as "El Modelo".

La Bulligrafía was slated to open in 2021 or 2022 in a factory space outside Barcelona, in L'Hospitalet de Llobregat where the brothers were born.

== Travelling exhibits ==
The Foundation has also funded exhibits about the brothers' culinary legacy, including "Ferran Adria: The Invention of Food" at St. Petersburg, Florida's Dali Museum in 2016.
