= Martin Hadden =

British chef

- Culinary career
- Cooking style: European cuisine
- Rating: Michelin stars
- Previous restaurants: Room at the Halcyon; Ockenden Manor; The Priory House
- Award won: Roux Scholarship

Martin Hadden is a British chef, who won a Michelin star at both Ockenden Manor and The Priory House. He was the winner of the Roux Scholarship in 1989, and after leaving the kitchen at the Priory House in 2003 he went on to become Executive Chef for the Historic Sussex Hotels group.

== Career ==
In 1989, at the age of 19, Hadden won the Roux Scholarship, a prize awarded by Michel and Albert Roux to allow chefs to travel to three Michelin star restaurants to gain experience. Hadden chose to travel to France to work at Maison Pic under Jacques Pic. Further appointments followed, first at Gidleigh Park, and then at Chez Nico under Nico Ladenis.

In 1994, he became head chef at the restaurant Room at the Halcyon at the age of 24, aiming to win Michelin stars. After failing to win a star in his first year, he reduced the size of the menu to one which the kitchen could produce on a consistent basis. Hadden left the restaurant in 1999, moving to Ockenden Manor in Sussex. In 2001, he purchased The Priory House in Somerset, with the intention of renovating it into the first restaurant he would personally own and run. The contracts were exchanged two days prior to the release of the new Michelin Guide which gave Hadden a Michelin Star for his work at Ockenden Manor. He left Ockenden Manor shortly afterwards, to work full-time at the Priory House.

He won a Michelin star at the Priory House within the first year of it opening, but by November 2002 he had listed it for sale, saying that he was tired of having to do all the mundane jobs which working in such a small restaurant required but which could be delegated in larger establishments, and that he wanted his wife to be able to spend more time with their children. He hoped to be able to move back to Historic Sussex Hotels group, under which he had worked at Ockenden Manor. He served his last meal in the restaurant on 7 June 2003, with the restaurant being sold for nearly £275,000. Hadden moved on to become Executive Head Chef for Historic Sussex Hotels, overseeing Ockenden Manor, the Spread Eagle hotel and Bailiffscourt hotel.
