= Ferran Adrià =

Spanish chef (born 1962)

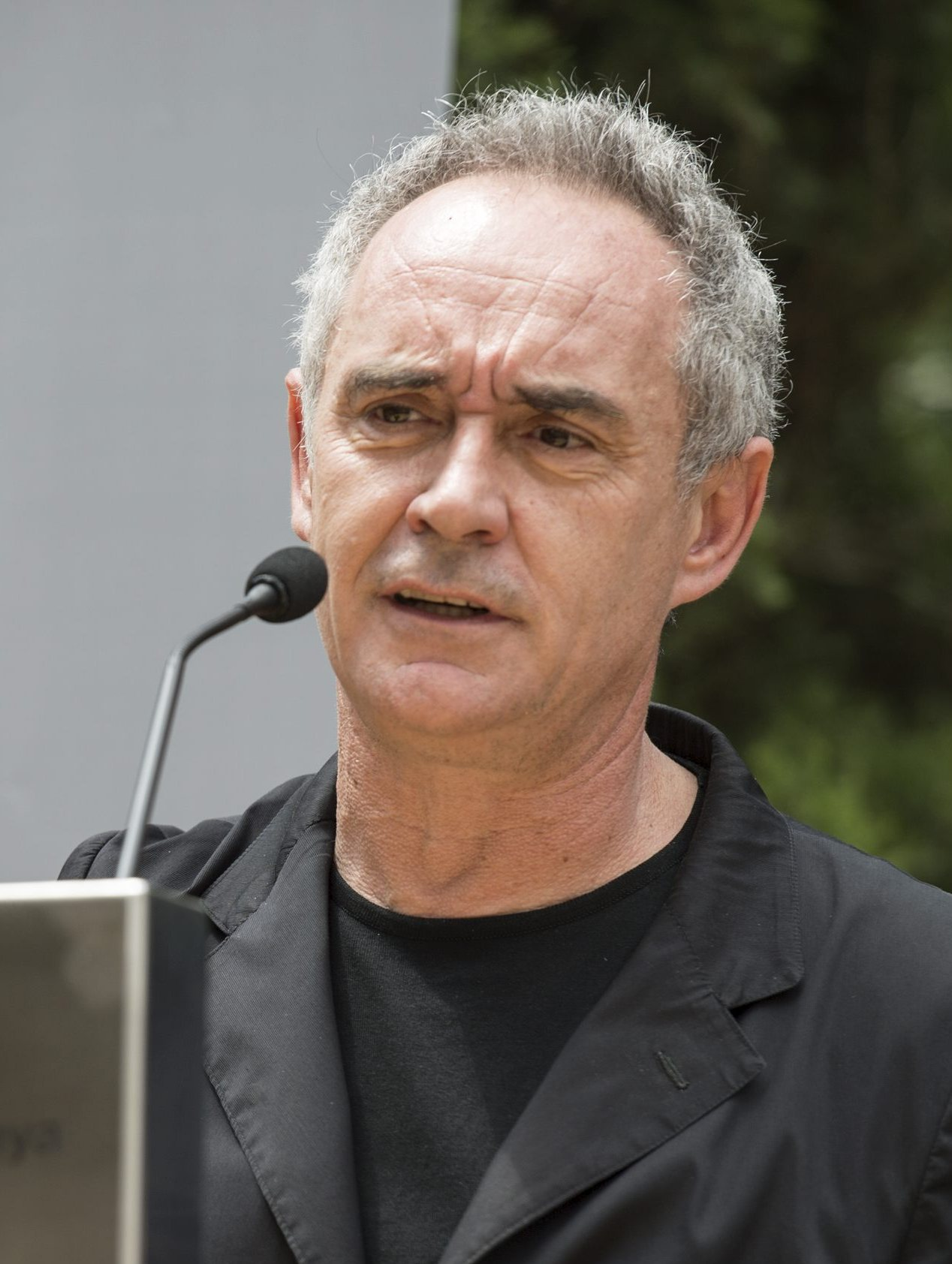
- Adrià in the presentation of elbullifoundation's exhibition Un projecte per compartir (A Project to Share)
- Born: Ferran Adrià Acosta; 14 May 1962 (age 64); L'Hospitalet de Llobregat, Catalonia, Spain
- Culinary career
- Cooking style: Haute cuisine; molecular gastronomy
- Current restaurant
- elBulli

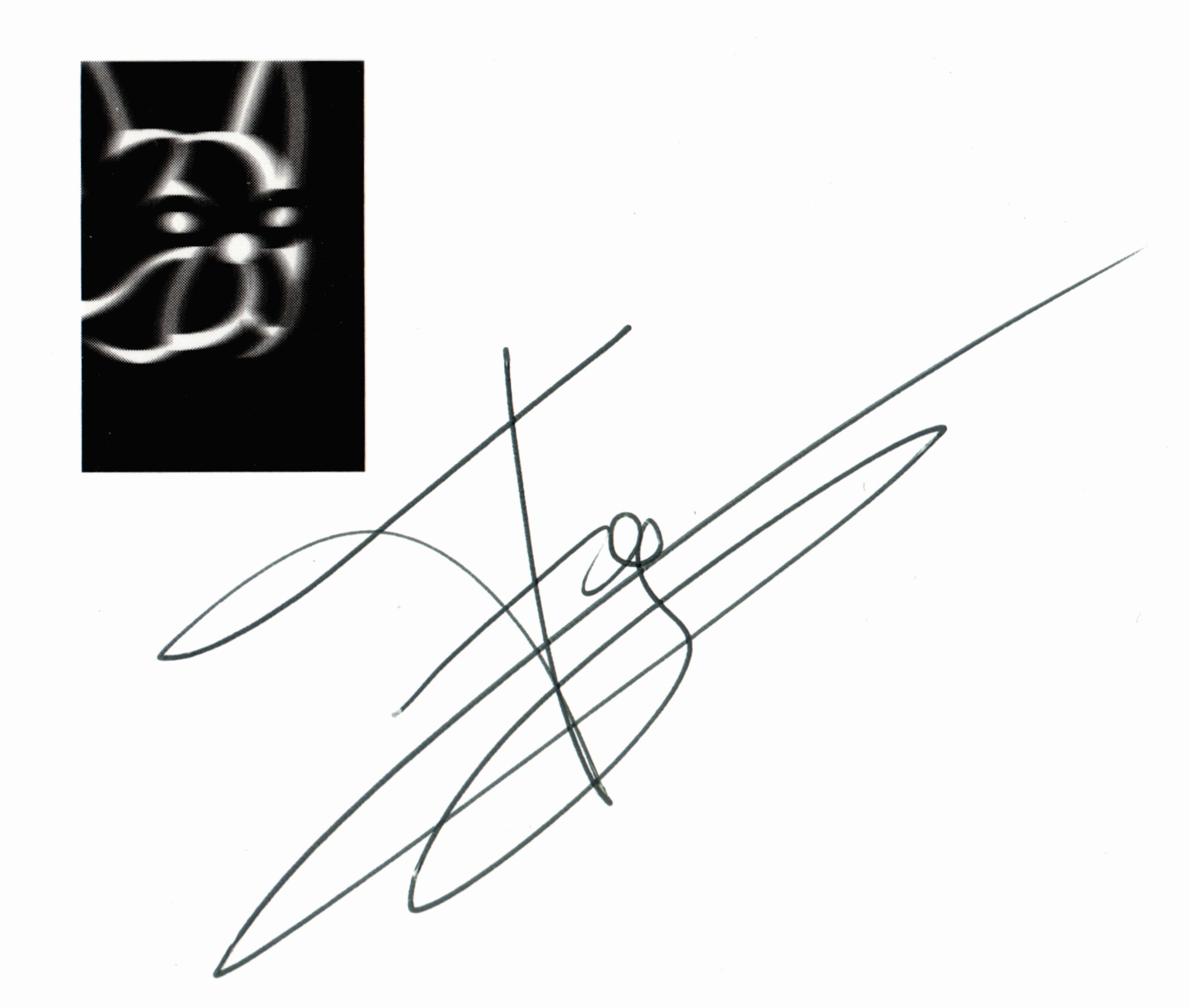
Signature of Ferran Adrià

Ferran Adrià Acosta (Note: Catalan names were illegal during the Francoist dictatorship, and so the Spanish State only recognized the castilianized name Fernando Adrián Acosta during this period.) (Catalan pronunciation: [fəˈran əðɾiˈa əˈkɔstə]; born 14 May 1962) is a Spanish chef. He was the head chef of the El Bulli restaurant in Roses on the Costa Brava and is considered one of the premier chefs in the world. He has often collaborated with his brother, the renowned pastry chef Albert Adrià.

== Career ==
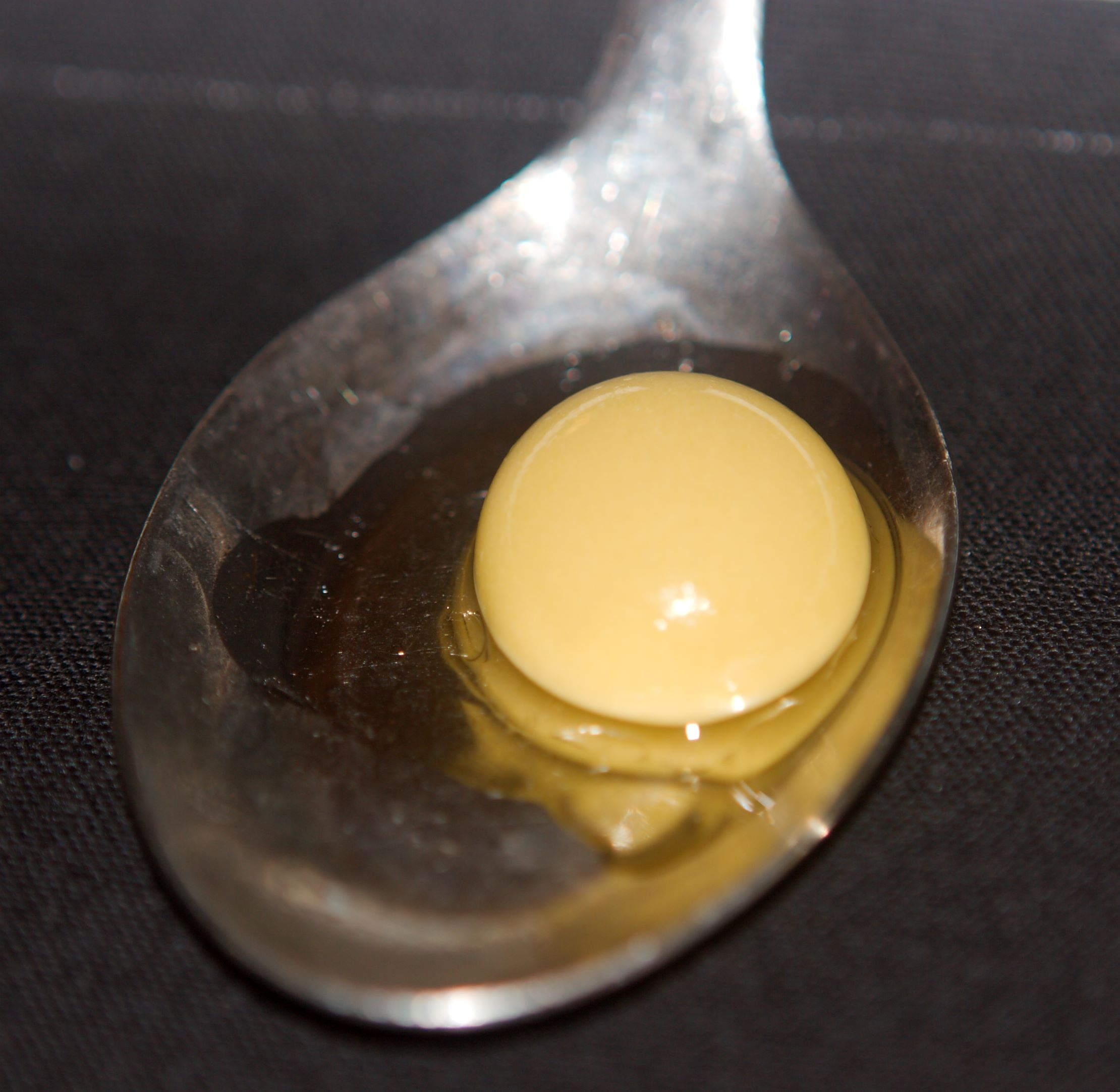
A liquid olive, one of Adrià's appetizers

Ferran Adrià began his culinary career in 1980 during his stint as a dishwasher at the Hotel Playafels, in the town of Castelldefels. The chef de cuisine at this hotel taught him traditional Spanish cuisine. At 19 he was drafted into military service where he worked as a cook. In 1984, at the age of 22, Adrià joined the kitchen staff of elBulli as a line cook. Eighteen months later he became the head chef.

In 1994, Ferran Adrià and Juli Soler (his partner) sold 20% of their business to Miquel Horta (a Spanish millionaire and philanthropist and son of the founder of Nenuco) for 120 million pesetas. This event became a turning point for elBulli, the money was used to finance an expansion of the kitchen and the relationship with Horta opened the door to new clients, businessmen, and politicians who helped spread the word about the creative experimentation happening at the time in Cala Montjoi.

Along with British chef Heston Blumenthal, Adrià is often associated with "molecular gastronomy", although like Blumenthal the Spanish chef does not consider his cuisine to be of this category. Instead, he has referred to his cooking as deconstructed cuisine. He defines the term as 'Taking a dish that is well known and transforming all its ingredients, or part of them; then modifying the dish's texture, form and/or its temperature. Deconstructed, such a dish will preserve its essence... but its appearance will be radically different from the original's.' His stated goal is to "provide unexpected contrasts of flavour, temperature and texture. Nothing is what it seems. The idea is to provoke, surprise and delight the diner."

elBulli was only open for about six months of the year, from mid-June to mid-December. Adrià spent the remaining six months of the year perfecting recipes in the workshop "elBulliTaller" in Barcelona. The restaurant closed on 30 July 2011. It reopened as a creativity center to foster innovation like his own and entirely new ideas in 2014.

elBulli had 3 Michelin stars and was one of the best restaurants in the world. It received first place in the Restaurant Top 50 in 2002. Then in 2005, it ranked second. It was again awarded the first place in 2006, and retained this title in 2007, 2008 and 2009, making a record 5 times in the top spot. In 2010, after elBulli announced it would close for good the next season, the title was awarded to Noma of Copenhagen, Denmark.

Adrià is well known for creating "culinary foam". Adrià explored foams created without the addition of cream or egg white; foams are made of a flavoured liquid and an additive (such as lecithin), then aerated through a variety of methods, including whipping with an immersion blender or extrusion from a siphon bottle equipped with N_{2}O cartridges. Further culinary processes (such as freeze-drying or freezing with liquid nitrogen) may be applied to foams as well. Using a single flavoured liquid allows the flavour of the final product to be less diluted and thus more intense.

Adrià is the author of several cookbooks including A Day at El Bulli, El Bulli 2003–2004 and Cocinar en Casa (Cooking at Home). With his assistant Daniel Picard, Adrià has made almonds into cheese and asparagus into bread with the help of natural ingredients.

In autumn 2010, Adrià and José Andrés taught a culinary physics course, "Science and Cooking" at Harvard University. In October 2010, Adrià announced an alliance with Telefónica.

In March 2012 he announced a new project, LaBullipedia. In a later interview he described the project as "A Western haute cuisine Wikipedia at the service of information but also creativity". As of 2025, this project has not materialized.

An art exhibition about Adrià and his restaurant, 'elBulli: Ferran Adrià and The Art of Food', was hosted at Somerset House in London in 2013. The exhibition will be included in a new permanent museum Adrià was set to open at the El Bulli Foundation in 2021. The El Bulli museum opened in 2023 under the name elBulli1846.

He received the 1995 Lucky Strike Designer Award.

== documenta 12 ==
In 2007, Adrià was invited to participate in documenta, "a sort of art world Olympics." Adrià felt like an intruder at the event, saying "artists all over battle all their lives to receive an invitation to display their work at documenta and now I, a cook, am asked to go along!" Organizer Roger Buergel told Adrià that he believed "that to create a new cooking technique was as complicated and challenging as painting a great picture. He said that he sees the work [Adrià] does as a new artistic discipline, that [Adrià's] work shows cuisine should be a new art form." With this notion in mind, Buergel invited him to partake in this prestigious international event held every five years in Kassel, Germany.

Adrià decided to take a different approach to this event. With the approval of the documenta committee, he set up his pavilion (i.e., exhibition space) some 850 miles from Kassel in his own restaurant, El Bulli. He believed that in order to truly experience his craft one had to come into his controlled environment because what he does is "ephemeral, it's not moveable, it can't be in a museum" (it was also impractical to move all his equipment there). It was then agreed upon that every day, two names would be selected at random and those names would be the diners who would be able to see his 'pavilion'. The collection of these experiences were documented, along with photographs and interviews from an eclectic group of figures in the art world (including Massimo De Carlo, Bice Curiger, Anya Gallaccio, Massimiliano Gioni, Carsten Höller, Peter Kubelka, Antoni Miralda, Jerry Saltz, Adrian Searle, Vicente Todolí and Richard Hamilton), and were published in Food for Thought, Thought for Food.

However, there was some controversy regarding Adrià's participation in documenta, "some questioning the idea that cooking and art were co-extensive." Despite the fact that dishes from avant-garde cuisine are aesthetically pleasing (you eat first with your eyes), one of his colleagues, Chef Heston Blumenthal from the Fat Duck in Great Britain, "is uneasy about the idea that he might be an artist, although he does compare restaurant going to a trip to the theater, the cinema or an art gallery." Adrià himself has compared a dinner at his restaurant to a night out at the theater. When people discuss a meal there, they usually talk about the rhythm and flow of the dishes, and that the movements of the waiters and sommeliers are amazingly choreographed. He said he has "turned eating into an experience that supersedes eating."

== Controversy ==
Adrià denounced his fellow 3-star Michelin cook Santi Santamaria who described his approach to cuisine as "pretentious". Traditionalist Santi Santamaria attacked Adrià's dishes in elBulli as unhealthy, alleging that "Adrià's dishes are designed to impress rather than satisfy and used chemicals that actually put diners' health at risk". Top chefs, however, accused Santamaria, who ran the 3-star Can Fabes also in Catalonia, of envy and "endangering the reputations of Spanish kitchens". The criticism has split top Spanish chefs into pro- and anti-Adrià camps.

German food writer Jörg Zipprick accused Adrià of more or less poisoning his customers with the additives he uses in his cuisine and said that Adrià's menu should carry health warnings: "These colorants, gelling agents, emulsifiers, acidifiers and taste enhancers that Adrià has introduced massively into his dishes to obtain extraordinary textures, tastes and sensations do not have a neutral impact on health."

== Domestic commercialisation ==
Texturas is a range of products by Ferran Adrià, and his brother Albert Adrià. The products include the Sferificación, Gelificación, Emulsificación, Espesantes and Surprises lines. Texturas include products such as Xanthan and Algin which are packaged and labelled as Xantana Texturas and Algin Texturas respectively. Xanthan gum allows the user to use a very small amount to thicken soups, sauces and creams without changing the flavour. Algin is a key component of the "Spherification Kit" and is used for every spherical preparation: caviar, raviolis, balloons, gnocchi, pellets, and mini-spheres.

== Works ==
el Bulli 2003–2004 Cookbook

- El Bulli 1983–1993 (with Juli Soler and Albert Adrià)
- El Bulli: el sabor del Mediterráneo, 1993, ISBN 84-7596-415-X
- Los secretos de El Bulli, 1997, ISBN 84-487-1000-2
- El Bulli 1994–1997 (with Juli Soler and Albert Adrià)
- Cocinar en 10 minutos con Ferran Adrià, 1998, ISBN 84-605-7628-0
- Celebrar el milenio con Arzak y Adrià (with Juan Mari Arzak), 1999, ISBN 84-8307-246-7
- El Bulli 1998–2002 (with Juli Soler and Albert Adrià), Conran Octopus, 2003, ISBN 1-84091-346-0; Ecco, 2005, ISBN 0-06-081757-7
- El Bulli 2003–2004 (with Juli Soler and Albert Adrià), Ecco, 2006, ISBN 0-06-114668-4
- El Bulli 2005
- A Day at El Bulli 2008
- FOOD for thought THOUGHT for food (El Bulli y Ferran Adrià), 2009 ACTAR Editorial, ISBN 978-84-96954-68-7
- The Family Meal: Home Cooking with Ferran Adrià 2011 Phaidon, ISBN 978-0-7148-6253-8

In October 2008, Ferran Adrià published A Day At El Bulli along with Juli Soler, and Albert Adrià. The book describes 24-hours at the El Bulli restaurant, with images, commentary, photographs and 30 recipes. Most of the recipes included are complex and require many out-of-the ordinary kitchen appliances, such as a Pacojet, freeze-dryer, liquid nitrogen tank, candyfloss machine and Perspex molds.

== See also ==
- Haute cuisine

== Notes and references ==
Notes
