= Sushi bake =

Baked deconstructed sushi roll

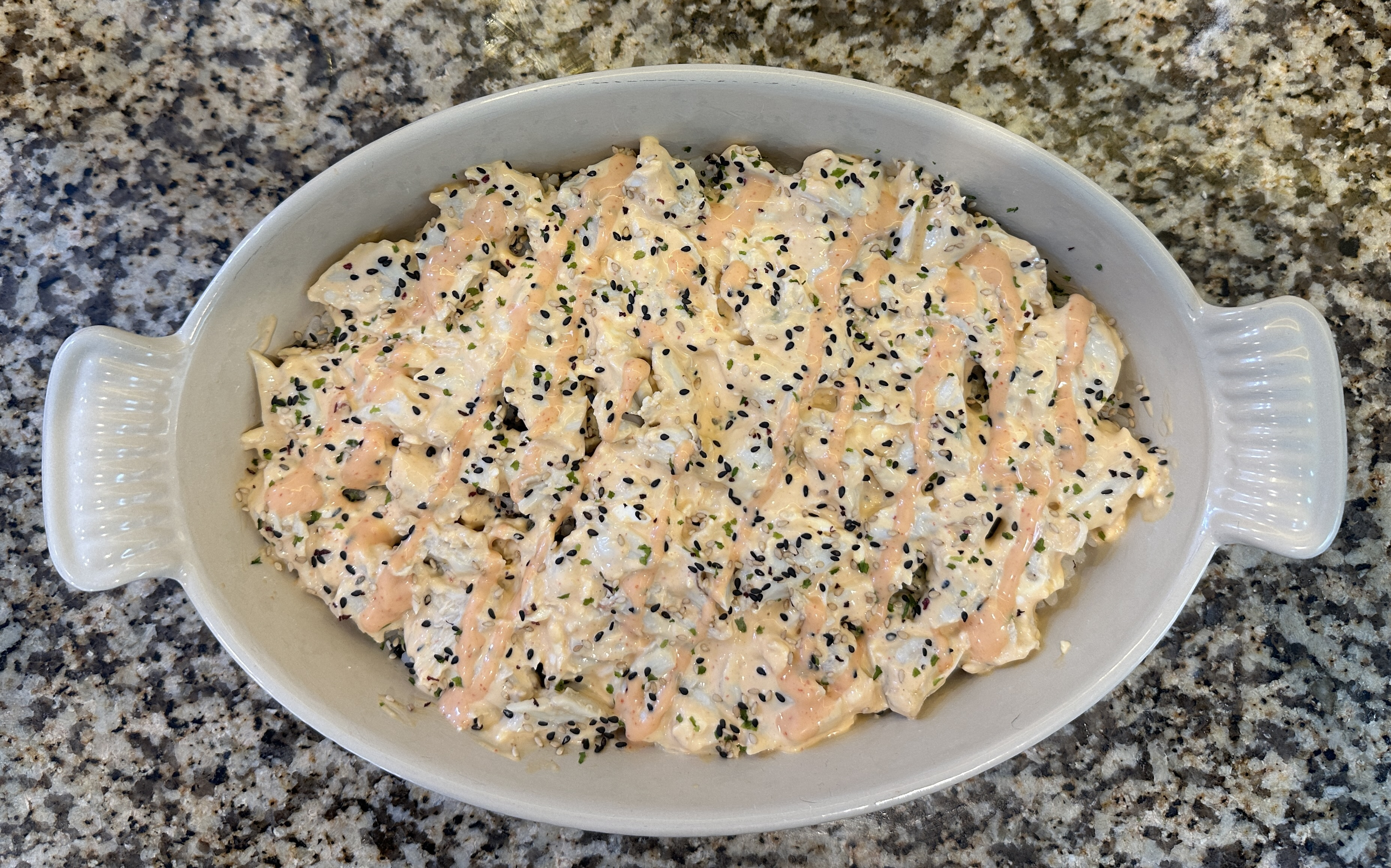
Sushi bake casserole ready to go into the oven

Sushi bake or baked sushi is a type of sushi-inspired casserole. It is essentially a deconstructed California roll that is baked in an oven. It is believed to have originated as early as the 2010s, but became popular in Hawaii, Southeast Asia, and internationally in the early 2020s.

== History ==
According to Bon Appetit, the dish "[took] off in the early days of lockdown" in the Philippines early in the COVID-19 lockdowns. It was known in Hawaii before the lockdowns as pan sushi or poke pan sushi and was a popular potluck dish. A recipe for "pan sushi dynamite" was included in Sheldon Simeon's Cook Real Hawai’i, which was published in March of 2021.

== Ingredients and serving ==
The dish's ingredients are similar to that of a California roll, in which crab stick, cucumber, cream cheese and avocado are wrapped in nori and rice and topped with sriracha mayonnaise.

In the sushi bake, the California roll is deconstructed and served as a casserole. The sushi bake uses a base of short-grain rice tossed in vinegar and topped with crab or crab sticks in a cream cheese, Kewpie mayonnaise and sriracha sauce, seasoned with furikake, baked, topped with sriracha mayonnaise and served with sheets of nori and garnishes of avocados, cucumbers, and sometimes wasabi or unagi sauce.

The casserole is typically assembled in an oiled dish which the rice layer is pressed into, and which when baked develops a crispy crust. The casserole is cut into portions which diners use, along with garnishes, to assemble into a wrap.

=== Variations ===
Variations include using other seafood instead of crab or crab stick and unbaked versions; a recipe for an unbaked version was published online in 2013.
