= Steve Drake (chef) =

British chef

- Born: Essex, United Kingdom
- Culinary career
- Cooking style: British cuisine
- Rating: Michelin stars
- Current restaurant: Sorrel (restaurant)
- Previous restaurant: Drake's on the Pond
- Award won: Roux Scholarship

Steve Drake is a British chef who has held a Michelin star at three restaurants, including his current establishment, Sorrel. He has previously worked under a number of chefs, including Nico Ladenis and Marco Pierre White.

Sorrel announced its closure with immediate effect on 28th July 2026, with Steve Drake stating “The financials of running an independent restaurant simply don’t work and we have lost a lot of money trying to keep it afloat.”

== Career ==
He began his culinary career working in a café making bacon sandwiches. After culinary school he began working under Keith Stanley at The Ritz London Hotel, at the age of 17 in 1990. He was staying in shared accommodation, and met a fellow chef who was working at Nico Ladenis' restaurant. Drake went for an interview and gained a job there, staying for a year.

He moved to work at Pied à Terre under Tom Aikens during the period when Aikens had just taken over from the previous chef. He only stayed for a few months an interviewed for a job at the Oak Room, working for Marco Pierre White. On his first day there, his job was to prep the tomatoes for a crab dish. On the second day a chef on the fish section left, and White placed Drake onto the section, where he stayed for the rest of the time at the restaurant.

After Gordon Ramsay left Aubergine, Drake was brought in as a sous chef under William Drabbel for the reopening of the restaurant. He left the restaurant to become a head chef at Drake's on the Pond in Abinger Hammer, Surrey. Whilst he was there, Drake won the Roux Scholarship in 2001 and travelled to France to work at L'Auberge de l'Eridan. It was the third time that Drake had reached the final of the scholarship, having done so previously in both 1999 and 2000. In 2003, Drake's on the Pond was awarded a Michelin star.

Drake left the restaurant shortly afterwards to become chef proprietor at Drake's, in Ripley, Surrey, purchasing the restaurant from Michel and Dorothy Albina. It was awarded a Michelin star in its first year, and three AA Rosettes.

Drake left Drake's restaurant at the end of August 2016 to set up a new venture

In 2017 Drake launched Sorrel a 32 cover restaurant in a red brick building on South Street in Dorking, Surrey
