= Ockenden Manor =

Listed manor house in West Sussex, England

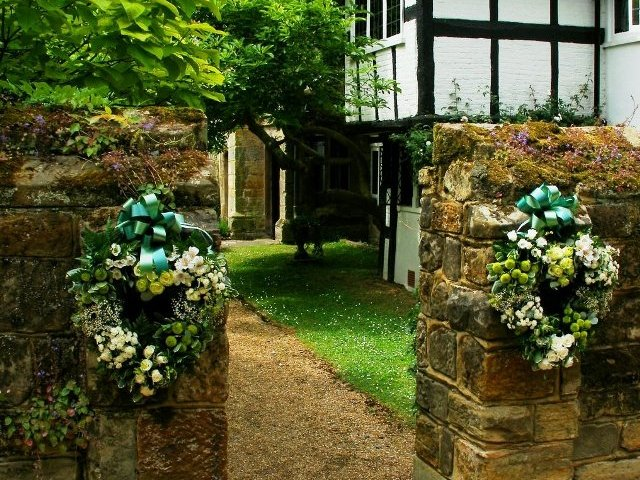
- Garden gate, Ockendon Manor

- Location within West Sussex

General information
- Location: Cuckfield, West Sussex, England
- Coordinates: 51.006°N 0.144°W
- Year built: Late 16th century
- Renovated: Early 17th century and 1858 (additions)

Website
- Official website

Listed Building – Grade II*
- Official name: Ockenden Manor
- Designated: 10 September 1951
- Reference no.: 1025490

Ockenden Manor is an Elizabethan manor house located in Cuckfield, West Sussex, England. The building is now operated as a hotel and restaurant by the Historic Sussex Hotels group.

== History ==
Ockenden Manor has been operated by the Historic Sussex Hotels group since 1987. The building itself is a Grade II* listed Elizabethan country manor, dating from the late 16th century with additional builds in the early 17th century and in 1858.

It won a Michelin star in 2001 under Martin Hadden, who left shortly afterwards to set up his own restaurant called The Priory House. After losing its star the next year, the restaurant regained it in 2004 and kept it until 2016 under chef Stephen Crane.

The restaurant was used as a location in the 2009 series of the BBC Two show Put Your Money Where Your Mouth Is, where chefs Nick Nairn and Aldo Zilli competed against each other using local ingredients.

Staff from the restaurant have been involved in the annual Roux Scholarship. Former head chef Martin Hadden was the winner of the scholarship in 1989, prior to coming to Ockenden Manor. Matthew Tomkinson won the scholarship in 2005 whilst working at the restaurant, and Vincent Fayat in 2006 and Mark Charker in 2012 reached the regional finals of the competition.

As of June 2018, The Food Standards Agency rated the hotel and spa a hygiene rating of 4 out of 5 - Good.

== Reception ==
Harden's restaurant guide states that there have been "over a hundred visits in a decade, and never disappointed". On a scale of one to five, with one being high, it gives Ockenden Manor a score of two for each of food, service and ambience, describing chef Crane's food as "excellent". The restaurant has been awarded three AA Rosettes, meaning that "expectations of the kitchen are high: exact technique, flair and imagination must come through in every dish, and balance and depth of flavour are all-important".

== See also ==
- Grade II* listed buildings in West Sussex
