= Victor Ceserani =

British cook, teacher and writer

Victor Joseph (né Vittorio Giuseppe) Ceserani (Note: The pronunciation of the family name became and remained anglicised (/ˌsiːzəˈrɑːni/ SEE-zə-RAH-nee) rather than the Italian [tʃezeˈraːni], so much so that Victor's nickname at school was "Caesar".) MBE (23 October 1919 – 18 February 2017) was a British cook, teacher and writer. Born in London to an Italian father and Belgian mother, he followed his father into the catering industry and became a successful chef. In 1950 he decided that he wished to pass on his cooking skills to a new generation and retrained as a college lecturer. Together with his colleague Ronald Kinton he published a cookery book, Practical Cookery in 1962, written specifically for apprentice chefs and trainees at cookery colleges. It was continually revised over the next four decades; Kinton, shortly followed by Ceserani, handed over to younger writers for subsequent editions in the early 21st century.

Ceserani retired from his catering college post in 1980, but remained active in retirement for many years, as a consultant and as a judge for, among others, the Roux Scholarship.

== Life and career ==
=== Early years ===
Ceserani was born in Raphael Street, Knightsbridge, London, the only child of Annibale Ceserani and his wife, Josephine, née Gortebeke. Annibale, nicknamed "Bobby", was an Italian citizen until he took British nationality in the 1930s. He was a waiter at the Ritz Hotel, London; his wife, from Charleroi, Belgium, had come to England as a refugee during the First World War. Their son was educated at the London Oratory School, but was not academically inclined and left in 1935 when he was fifteen.

On leaving school, Ceserani joined the kitchens of the Ritz as an apprentice, at a wage of seven shillings and sixpence (Note: Seven shillings and sixpence – 37½ pence in decimal currency – was the approximate equivalent of £70 a week in 2020.) for a six-day week. Shortly after being awarded his post-apprenticeship certificate in 1937 he left the Ritz to become second chef at the Orleans Club in St James's. In the late 1930s he received notification of conscription into the Italian army. He tore the papers up, as his father had just taken out UK nationality, and Ceserani did not regard himself as Italian.

Five months after the Second World War began, Ceserani received his call-up papers for the British army. He joined the Royal Fusiliers, and at first trained as a motor mechanic, but was promoted to lance-corporal and moved to the officers' mess as cook for the 19th Battalion of Fusiliers in Cheshire. During the war, he cooked in various officers' messes. In 1942 he married Letitia Boyle, whom he had met at the Pheasantry Club in the King's Road, Chelsea before the war. The marriage was lifelong; the couple had two sons, born in 1954 and 1957.

=== Post-war ===
Returning from France to London after demobilisation in 1946, Ceserani was appointed second chef and, from July 1948, head chef at Boodle's club in St James's. Among its members were many from the landed aristocracy, some of whom augmented the kitchen's meagre post-war food rations with game, salmon and other scarce but unrationed delicacies from their estates:

I was very lucky working in such a club ... I'd sometimes have as many as ten salmon coming in in the morning weighing from seven pounds to fifty pounds ... and whole carcasses of venison would arrive, they’d been shot, they’d been gutted and skinned and they would arrive at the club ... huge hampers used to come ... in the appropriate season out would come tumbling pheasants, hares, rabbits, grouse, snipe, woodcock, partridges and so on, that all helped us considerably.

Nonetheless, Ceserani achieved a certain notoriety by experimenting with − unrationed − beaver as a meat course.

While convalescing after an operation in 1950 Ceserani reflected on his good fortune in having cooked in such a range of kitchens and having been so well taught by experts. He felt the urge to pass his knowledge on to a new generation of aspiring chefs. He resigned from Boodle's and took a year's teacher training course at the North Western Polytechnic (now part of the University of North London). After completing the course he successfully applied for a post at the new Acton Hotel and Catering School, part of Acton Technical College. At first students copied all their recipes from the blackboard, but Ceserani and his fellow lecturer Ronald Kinton (Note: Ronald F. Kinton (1921–2023) began his career with a three-year chef training course at what is now Westminster Kingsway College, before working in kitchens at the Waldorf Hotel and Claridge's. At the outbreak of the Second World War he joined the Army Catering Corps. After the war, he returned to Claridge's, and after a spell in industrial catering he enrolled in a teacher training course at Garnett College, London. Like Ceserani, he was one of the founding staff members at the Acton Hotel School. He later moved to the staff of Garnett College. To mark his 100th birthday in 2021 Westminster Kingsway and the Institute of Hospitality inaugurated The Ronald Kinton Centenary Lecture, an annual event featuring speakers who are alumni of Westminster Kingsway.) decided to save time by having the recipes printed. Kinton suggested that they should collaborate on and publish a recipe book specifically aimed at catering students. This was the genesis of their 1962 book Practical Cookery.

The Acton school became part of Ealing College of Higher Education in 1957. In 1959, when the Catering Teachers' Association was formed, Ceserani was its first chairman, serving for four years. From 1962 to 1972, he combined his Ealing post with that of chief examiner for the City and Guilds of London Institute, the principal body awarding qualifications to students at catering (and many other) colleges. In 1965 he was appointed head of Ealing College's School of Hotel Keeping and Catering. It was one of the largest catering schools in Europe, with a staff of 40 teachers, and 300 full-time and 350 part-time students.

In 1968–69 Ceserani took a year's sabbatical from Ealing, serving as visiting professor at Michigan State University in the US, combining his lecturing duties there with studying for and being awarded a Master of Business Administration degree. He retired from the college in 1980, and in his retirement was much in demand within the catering industry as a consultant and judge. He was consultant to The Caterer and among his posts was that of judge for the Roux Scholarship, established by Albert and Michel Roux. The latter said of him:

Victor was simply the best, most passionate academician, an excellent cook and a great chef – a rare combination, not just in the UK, but also in the world. He was a giant in our profession, yet so gentle, humble and generous with advice and support. He was a man of action and an inspiration who led by example.

Ceserani died on 18 February 2017, aged 97. His funeral service was on 14 March at the Church of St Vincent de Paul, Isleworth, Middlesex.

== Practical Cookery (1962) ==
Once Ceserani and Kinton had finalised the text of their Practical Cookery they took it to a London publisher, who was willing to accept it but wanted to make it a de luxe publication with colour plates. This meant a projected selling price of two guineas (£2.10p) − prohibitive for the average student. Instead the authors took the typescript to Edward Arnold publishers, who, learning that projected sales to students could be as many as 10,000 copies, agreed to publish at £1 a copy. This price held for nearly ten years. The first edition came out in 1962. There are no pictures, except for a few line drawings showing cuts of meat. All the measurements in the first edition are imperial. The first two chapters cover the basic methods of cookery and culinary terms (with an emphasis on French terms). In the rest of the book are chapters on

- Stocks and sauces
- Hors d'oeuvre
- Soups
- Egg dishes
- Farinaceous dishes
- Fish
- Lamb and mutton,
- Beef
- Pork
- Veal
- Bacon
- Poultry and game
- Salads
- Vegetables
- Potatoes
- Pastry
- Savouries
- Sandwiches

Because Practical Cookery was written to help students prepare for national qualifications, the authors continually revised it to reflect changes in the awarding bodies, the curriculum, and in the way students were assessed. By the late 1980s, both authors, approaching seventy, looked to the future of the book and co-opted a younger co-author, David Foskett, a colleague of Ceserani at Ealing. He was co-author from the seventh edition (1990) onwards. Before the eleventh edition (2008) Kinton withdrew and a new co-author joined the team − John Campbell, a Michelin star-winning chef. From 2009 a separate volume, Foundation Practical Cookery, was published, designed for students in their first year, and Practical Cookery was aimed at senior students. Ceserani retired from the authorial team before the twelfth edition (2012).

=== Editions ===
	Year	Authors	Reference
First	1962	Ceserani and Kinton	OCLC 6503775
Second	1967	ib	ISBN 978-0-7131-1055-5
Third	1972	ib	ISBN 978-0-7131-1713-4
Fourth	1974	ib	ISBN 978-0-7131-1853-7
Fifth	1981	ib	ISBN 978-0-7131-0509-4
Sixth	1987	ib	ISBN 978-0-7131-7663-6
Seventh	1990	Ceserani, Kinton and David Foskett	ISBN 978-0-7131-7663-6
Eighth	1996	ib	ISBN 978-0-340-64782-0
Ninth	2000	ib	ISBN 978-0-340-74941-8
Tenth	2004	ib, Foskett listed first	ISBN 978-0-340-81147-4
Eleventh	2008	John Campbell, Foskett and Ceserani (without Kinton)	ISBN 978-0-340-94837-8
Twelfth	2012	Campbell and Foskett (without Ceserani)	ISBN 978-1-4441-7008-5
Thirteenth	2015	Foskett, Neil Rippington, Patricia Paskins, Steve Thorpe	ISBN 978-1-4718-3959-7
Fourteenth	2019	Foskett, Paskins, Rippington, Thorpe	ISBN 978-1-5104-6171-0

== Honours and awards ==
Ceserani was a Chevalier des Palmes académiques, an honorary member of the Association culinaire français and the Académie culinaire de France, and an honorary fellow of Ealing College. He received the Grand cordon culinaire and a Catey Special Award (1984) and Lifetime Achievement Award (1992). In 1975 he was created MBE for services to catering education.

== Notes, references and sources ==
=== Sources ===
- Addison, Paul (1995). Now the War is Over: A Social History of Britain 1945−51. London: Pimlico. ISBN 978-0-71-266203-1.
- Ceserani, Victor (1989). Catering for Life. London: Edward Arnold. ISBN 978-0-34-049456-1.
- Miller, Martin (1993). The Best of British Men. London: Best of British Publications. OCLC 1285460355.
- Roux, Michel (1989). "Introduction". Catering for Life. London: Edward Arnold. ISBN 978-0-34-049456-1.
