= El Bulli =

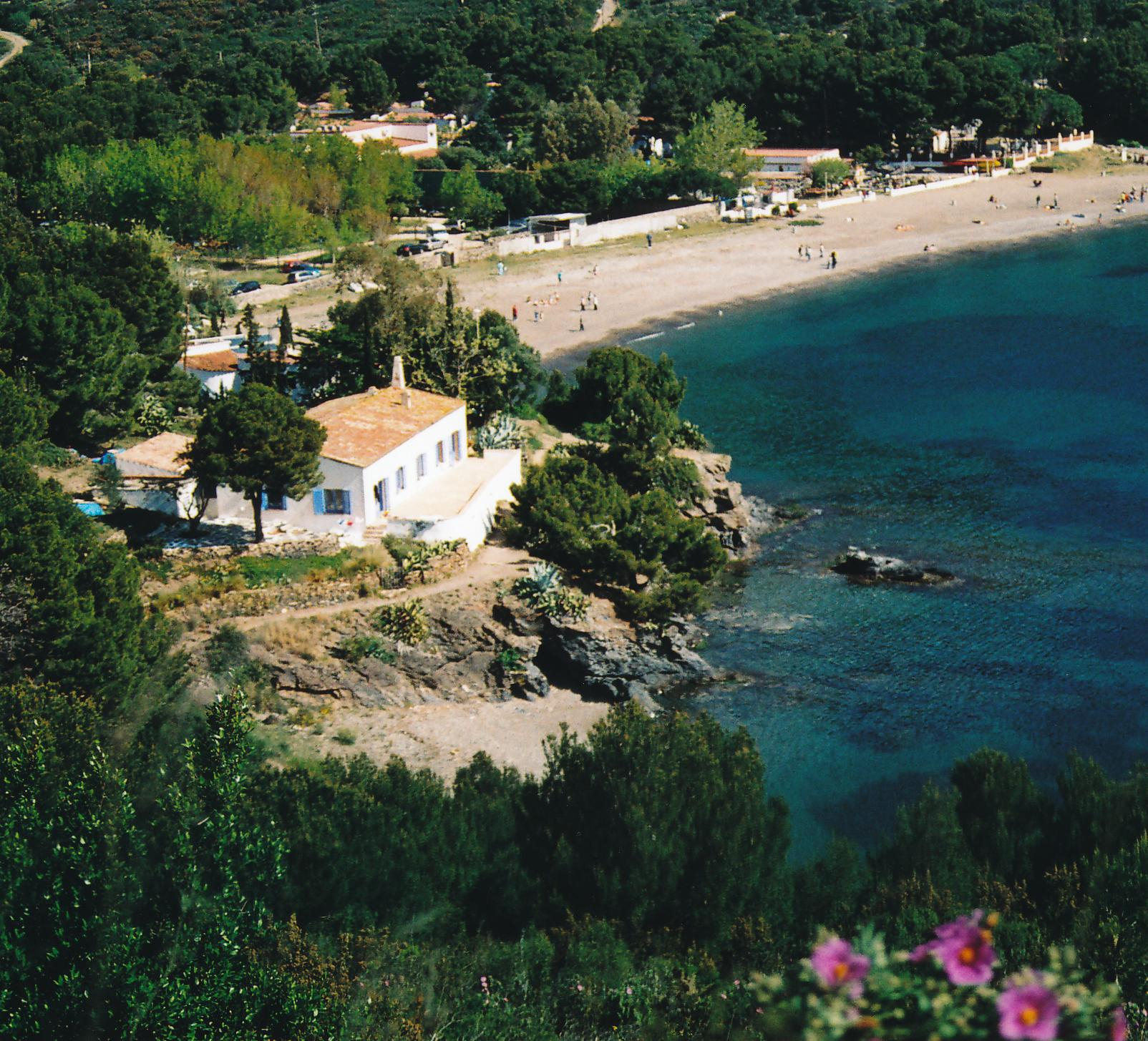
- The restaurant, seen from above
- Interactive map of El Bulli

Restaurant information
- Established: 1964 (62 years ago)
- Closed: 30 July 2011 (14 years ago)
- Head chef: Ferran Adrià
- Food type: Haute cuisine; molecular gastronomy
- Rating: (Michelin Guide)
- Location: Roses, Spain
- Coordinates: 42°15′00″N 003°13′35″E

El Bulli (Catalan pronunciation: [əl ˈβuʎi]) was a restaurant near the town of Roses, Spain, run by chef Ferran Adrià, later joined by Albert Adrià, and renowned for its modernist cuisine. Established in 1964, the restaurant overlooked Cala Montjoi, a bay on the Costa Brava of Catalonia. El Bulli held three Michelin stars and was described as "the most imaginative generator of haute cuisine on the planet" in 2006. The restaurant closed 30 July 2011 and relaunched as El Bulli Foundation, a center for culinary creativity.

== Restaurant ==
The restaurant had a limited season: the PIXA season, for example, ran from 15 June to 20 December. Bookings for the next year were taken on a single day after the closing of the current season. It accommodated only 8,000 diners a season, but got more than two million requests. The average cost of a meal was €250 (US$325). The restaurant itself operated at a loss since 2000, with operating profit coming from El Bulli-related books and lectures by Adrià. By April 2008, the restaurant employed 42 chefs.

Restaurant magazine judged El Bulli to be No. 1 on its Top 50 list of the world's best restaurants for a record five times—in 2002, 2006, 2007, 2008 and 2009, and No. 2 in 2010.

== History ==
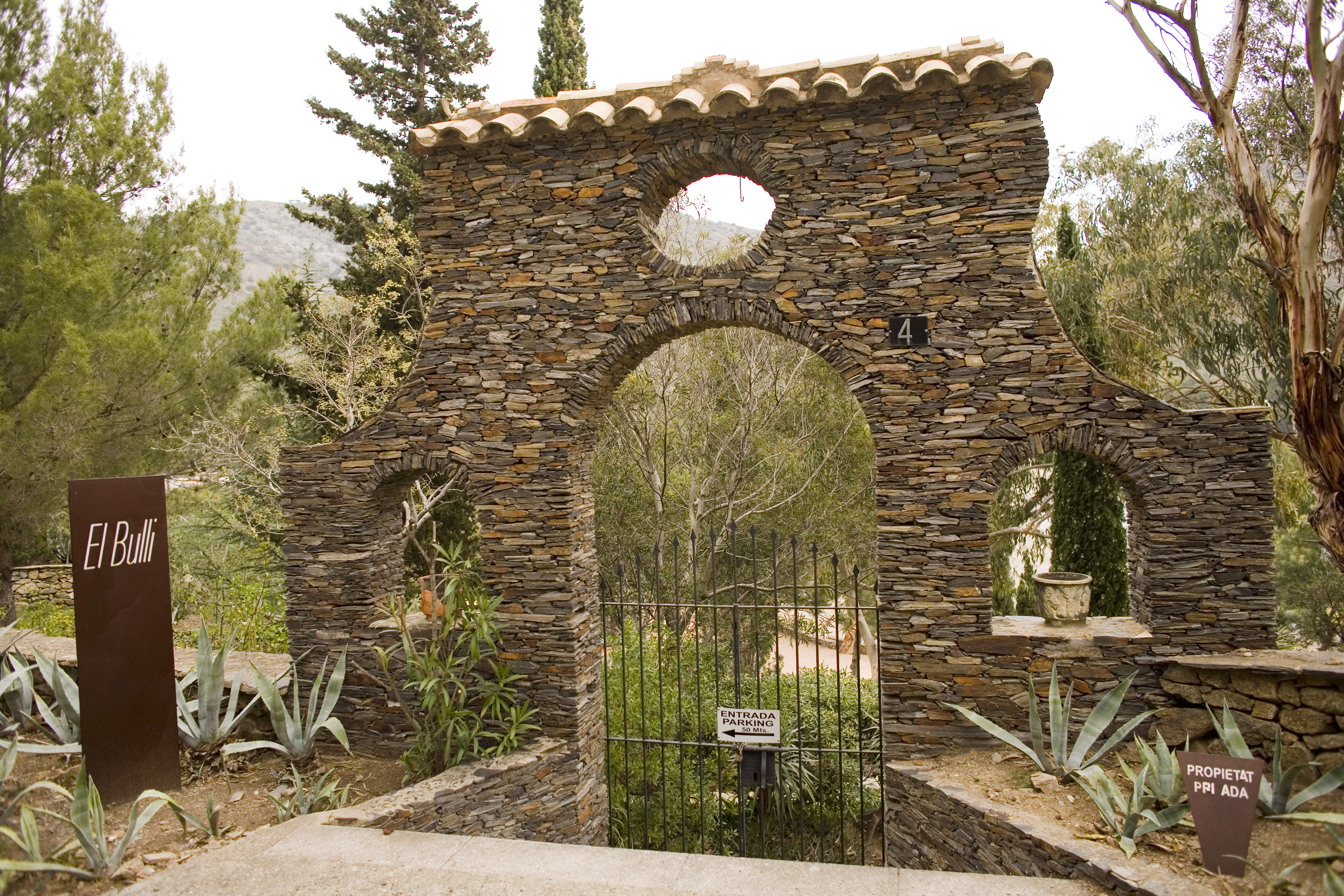
Front entrance

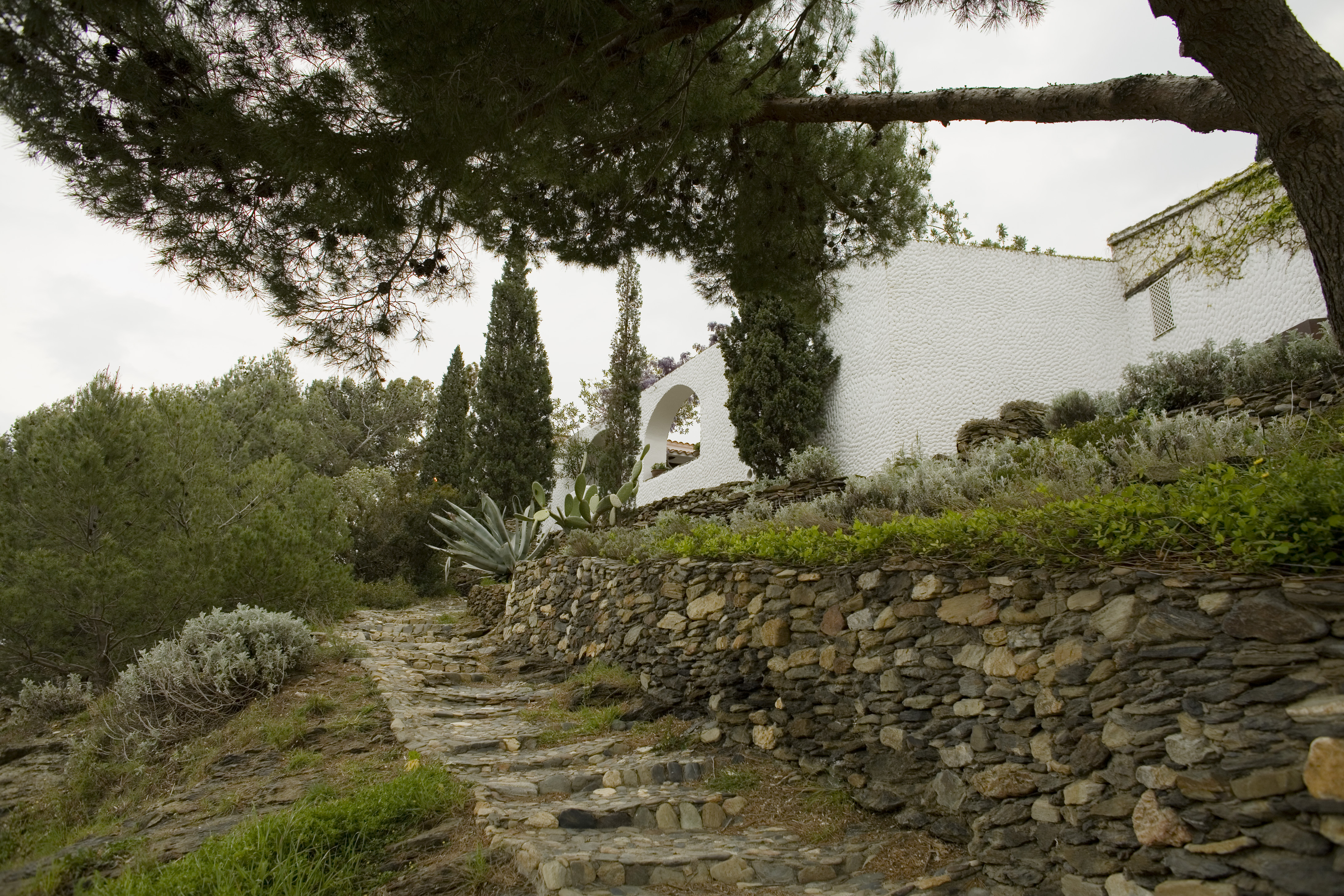
Rear entrance

The restaurant's location was selected in 1961 by Hans Schilling, a German, and his Czech wife Marketa, who wanted a piece of land for a planned holiday resort. By the year 1963, the resulting holiday resort included a small makeshift bar known in Spanish as a "chiringuito", which was variously called "El Bulli-bar" and "Hacienda El Bulli"; this little bar was the nucleus of the future restaurant El Bulli. The name "El Bulli" came from a colloquial term used to describe the French bulldogs the Schillings owned. The first restaurant was opened in 1964.

The restaurant won its first Michelin star in 1976 while under French chef Jean-Louis Neichel. Ferran Adrià joined the staff in 1984, and was put in sole charge of the kitchen in 1987. In 1990 the restaurant gained its second Michelin star, and in 1997 its third.

El Bulli has published books on its development, menu and philosophy since 1993, in both large format, some including CD-ROMs, and small format for supermarket sales. Ferran Adrià, Juli Soler, and Albert Adrià published A Day at El Bulli in 2008. The book describes 24 hours in the life of El Bulli in pictures, commentary and recipes. Among the recipes included in the book are melon with ham, pine-nut marshmallows, steamed brioche with rose-scented mozzarella, rock mussels with seaweed and fresh herbs, and passion fruit trees.

Chef and writer Anthony Bourdain described Albert Adrià's contributions thus: "His book is a shockingly beautiful catalog of his latest accomplishments here ... Pastry chefs everywhere—when they see this—will gape in fear, and awe, and wonder. I feel for them; like Eric Clapton seeing Jimi Hendrix for the first time, one imagines they will ask themselves 'What do I do now?'."

== Commercial products ==
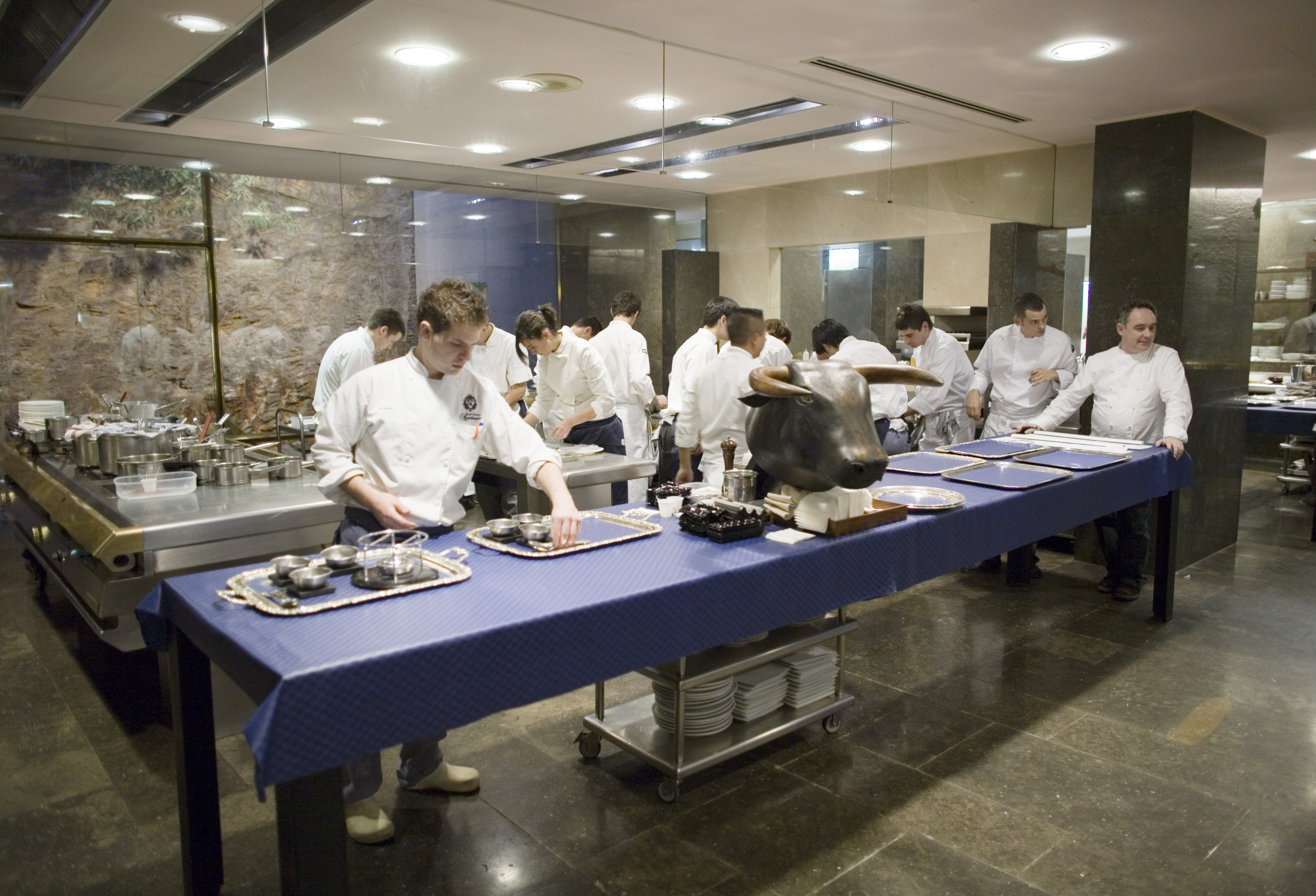
The kitchen at El Bulli

Texturas is a range of products by brothers Ferran and Albert Adrià. The products include the Sferificación, Gelificación, Emulsificación, Espesantes and Surprises lines and are the result of a rigorous process of selection and experimentation. Texturas includes products such as Xanthan and Algin which are packaged and labeled as Xantana Texturas and Algin Texturas respectively.

Xanthan gum allows the user to use a very small amount to thicken soups, sauces and creams without changing the flavour. Algin is a key component of the "Spherification Kit" and is essential for every spherical preparation: caviar, raviolis, balloons, gnocchi, pellets, and mini-spheres.

== Closure ==
In 2010, Ferran Adrià announced he would close El Bulli in 2012, due to the massive monetary loss it was incurring. He was quoted by The New York Times as planning to replace it with a culinary academy. He later denied the announcement, saying that The New York Times had misquoted him, and stated that El Bulli would reopen in 2014 after a two-year hiatus, as "initially planned" and would still serve food. Adrià later confirmed, in an October 2010 Vanity Fair article, that the restaurant would be closing permanently after July 2011.

In 2011, their website stated: "On July 30th 2011 El Bulli will have completed its journey as a restaurant. We will transform into a creativity center, opening in 2014. Its main objective is to be a think-tank for creative cuisine and gastronomy and will be managed by a private foundation." Bourdain interpreted the goal of the new El Bulli Foundation to be an elite culinary and dining experience development workshop, hosting not only chefs but "architects, philosophers, [and] designers", and allowing them to "not just share [their] successes, but to share [their] mistakes or [their] process with the world as it's happening" by providing a forum to explore such concepts as "do we need a dining room?" In 2021, The Observer named the closure of El Bulli as one of the 20 "key moments in food" of the prior 20 years.

== Film ==
El Bulli: Cooking in Progress is a documentary about the restaurant highlighting the iterative creative process that occurred behind the scenes. Directed by Gereon Wetzel, the film follows the creative team led by Ferran Adrià through the whole 2008–2009 season. It premiered at the 2010 International Documentary Film Festival in Amsterdam.

== Exhibition ==
From July to September 2013, Somerset House in London hosted an exhibition dedicated to the food of Ferran Adrià and El Bulli. The exhibition looked back over the evolution of the restaurant's laboratory and kitchen. Multimedia displays examined the methods behind the creation of signature dishes and original sketches and hand written notes of the recipe creations were on display with plasticine models of the dishes that were served.

== Bullinianos ==
An important legacy of El Bulli is the long list of relevant chefs from around the world who spent some time in the restaurant's kitchens during their training or research stage periods. The El Bulli Foundation website includes a complete list of all the chefs who have worked there throughout its long history, known as Bullinianos. Among the most internationally recognized are: Andoni Luis Aduriz (1993–94), from Mugaritz, José Andrés (1987–88), Massimo Bottura (2000) from Osteria Francescana, René Redzepi (2000) - Noma, Joan Roca (1989) and Jordi Roca (2001), from El Celler de Can Roca, Eduard Xatruch (1999-2011), Oriol Castro (1996-2011) and Mateu Casañas (1997-2011), from Disfrutar, and Aitor Zabala (2006-2009).

== Publications ==
- El Bulli 1983–1993 (with Juli Soler and Albert Adrià), 2004. w/CD-ROM.
- El Bulli: el sabor del Mediterráneo (with Juli Soler), 1993. ISBN 84-7596-415-X
- Los secretos de El Bulli 1997. Altaya. ISBN 84-487-1000-2
- El Bulli 1994–1997 (with Juli Soler and Albert Adrià), 2003. w/CD-ROM. Rba Libros, 2005. ISBN 978-84-7871-078-2
- Cocinar en 10 minutos con Ferran Adrià (with Josep M. Pinto), 1998. ISBN 84-605-7628-0
- Celebrar el milenio con Arzak y Adrià (with Juan Mari Arzak), 1999. ISBN 84-8307-246-7
- El Bulli 1998–2002 (with Juli Soler and Albert Adrià), Conran Octopus, 2003. w/CD-ROM. ISBN 1-84091-346-0; Ecco, 2005. ISBN 0-06-081757-7
- El Bulli 2003–2004 (with Juli Soler and Albert Adrià), Ecco, 2006. ISBN 0-06-114668-4
- El Bulli 2005 (with Juli Soler and Albert Adrià), 2006. w/CD-ROM. Rba Libros. ISBN 978-84-7871-607-4
- A Day At El Bulli 2007 (with Juli Soler and Albert Adrià), 2008. ISBN 978-84-7901-741-5
- FOOD for thought THOUGHT for food (El Bulli y Ferran Adrià), 2009 Actar Editorial. ISBN 978-84-96954-68-7
- Modern Gastronomy A to Z: A Scientific and Gastronomic Lexicon (Alicia Foundation, El Bullitaller), 2010. CRC Press. ISBN 978-1-4398-1245-7
- El Bulli 2005–2011 (Ferran Adrià, Albert Adrià, Juli Soler), 2014. ISBN 978-0714865485
