= Arzak =

Restaurant in San Sebastián, Spain

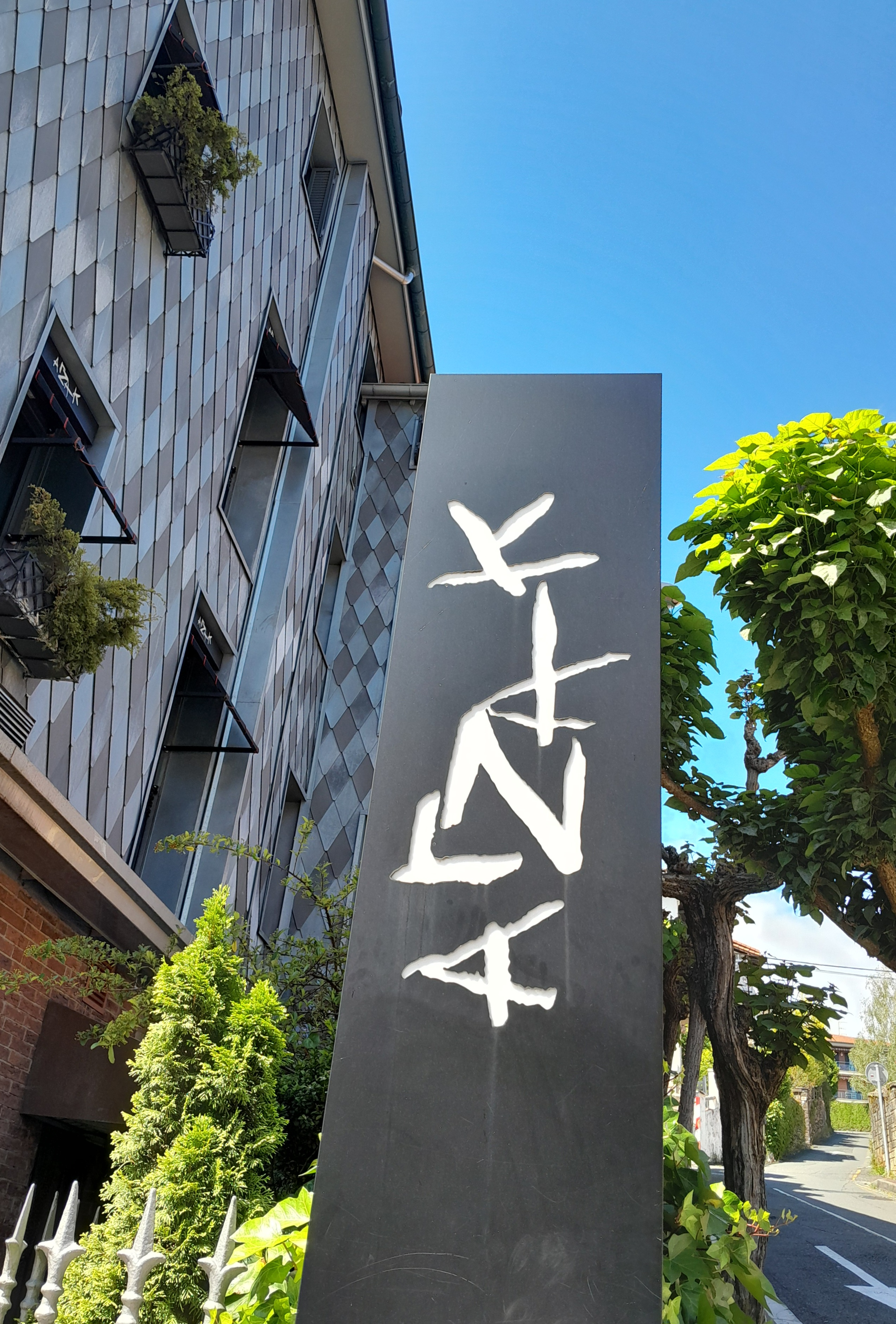
- Exterior of Arzak

- The location of the restaurant in Spain

Restaurant information
- Head chef: Juan Mari Arzak
- Rating: (Michelin Guide)
- Location: Avda. Alcalde Elósegui, 273, San Sebastián, Basque Country, 20015, Spain
- Coordinates: 43.321462°N 1.949258°W
- Website: www.arzak.info

Arzak is a restaurant in San Sebastián, Spain. It features New Basque Cuisine. In 2008, Arzak's owner and chef, Juan Mari Arzak, was awarded the Universal Basque award for "adapting gastronomy, one of the most important traditions of the Basque Country, to the new times and making of it one of the most innovative of the world".

== Description ==
Arzak serves modernized Basque cuisine, inspired by cooking techniques and presentation found in nouvelle cuisine. The restaurant is inside an old multiple-storied brick building, with the restaurant on the main floor. Above the restaurant is a wine cellar with over 100,000 bottles of wine, as well as a test kitchen. The test kitchen, established in 2000, is where the Arzaks come up with new recipes and methods. It houses over 1500 ingredients that can potentially serve as inspiration for a dish. Assisted by chefs Igor Zalacain and Xabi Gutiérrez, the Arzak test kitchen comes up with 40 new dishes a year, stemming from recipes that are created and refined over a period of three to six months.

== History ==
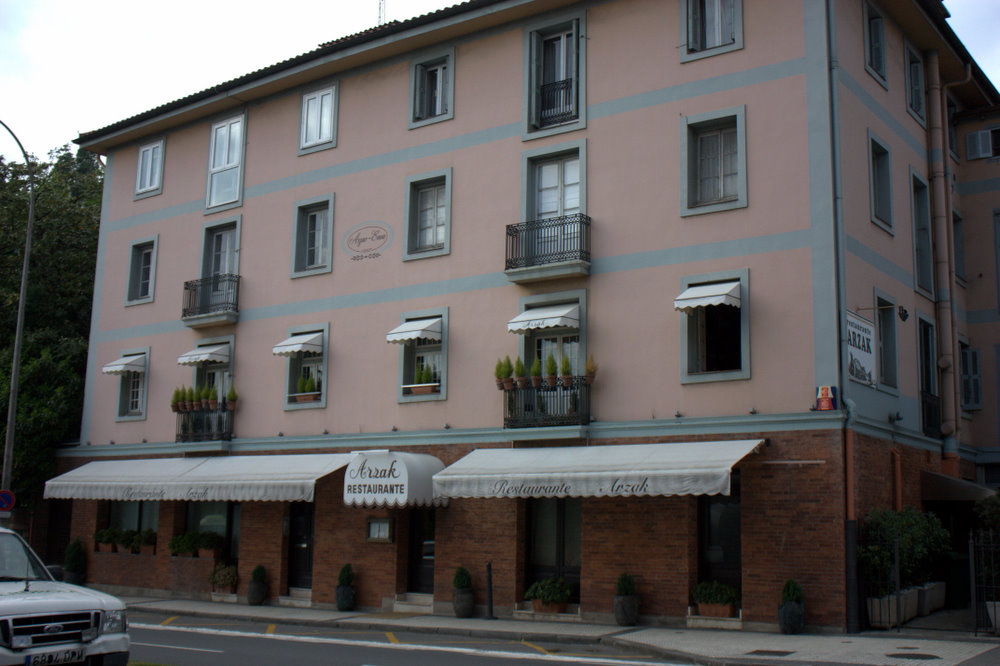
Old façade of the Arzak restaurant

Built as a house in 1897 by the current owner's grandparents (José Maria Arzak Etxabe and Escolastica Lete), they turned it into a wine inn and tavern. At the time, the village of Alza was separate from San Sebastián. When the next generation took over (Juan Ramon Arzak and Francisca Arratibel), it was turned into a restaurant. Kitchen duties are now shared between Juan Mari Arzak and his daughter Elena Arzak.

== Awards and honors ==
- 1989–present, Michelin Guide Three Stars
- 2003–present, Restaurant (magazine) S.Pellegrino World's 50 Best Restaurants
- 2013, 8th best restaurant in the world, S. Pellegrino

== See also ==
- Basque cuisine
- List of Basque restaurants
- List of Michelin-starred restaurants in Spain
