= Santi Santamaria =

Spanish Catalan chef

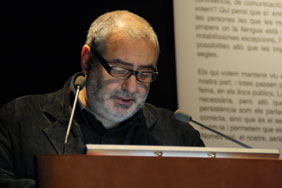
- Born: 26 July 1957; Sant Celoni, Catalonia, Spain
- Died: 16 February 2011 (aged 53); Singapore
- Culinary career
- Cooking style: Catalan; haute cuisine
- Current restaurant: Can Fabes

Santiago Santamaria i Puig (26 July 1957 – 16 February 2011), known as Santi Santamaria (Catalan pronunciation: [ˈsanti ˌsantəməˈɾi.ə]), was a Spanish Catalan avant-garde chef. He was the first Catalan chef and owner to have his restaurant receive three stars from the Michelin Guide (Can Fabes in 1994).

His second restaurant (Sant Celoni) was awarded two Michelin stars.

His style was a modern interpretation of traditional Catalan cuisine and slow food, focusing on fresh Mediterranean ingredients.

Santamaria made controversial accusations against the "molecular gastronomy" of other Spanish chefs, singling out Ferran Adrià.

Santamaria died on 16 February 2011 in his restaurant in Marina Bay Sands, Singapore of a heart attack.
