= Juli Soler =

Spanish business person (1949–2015)

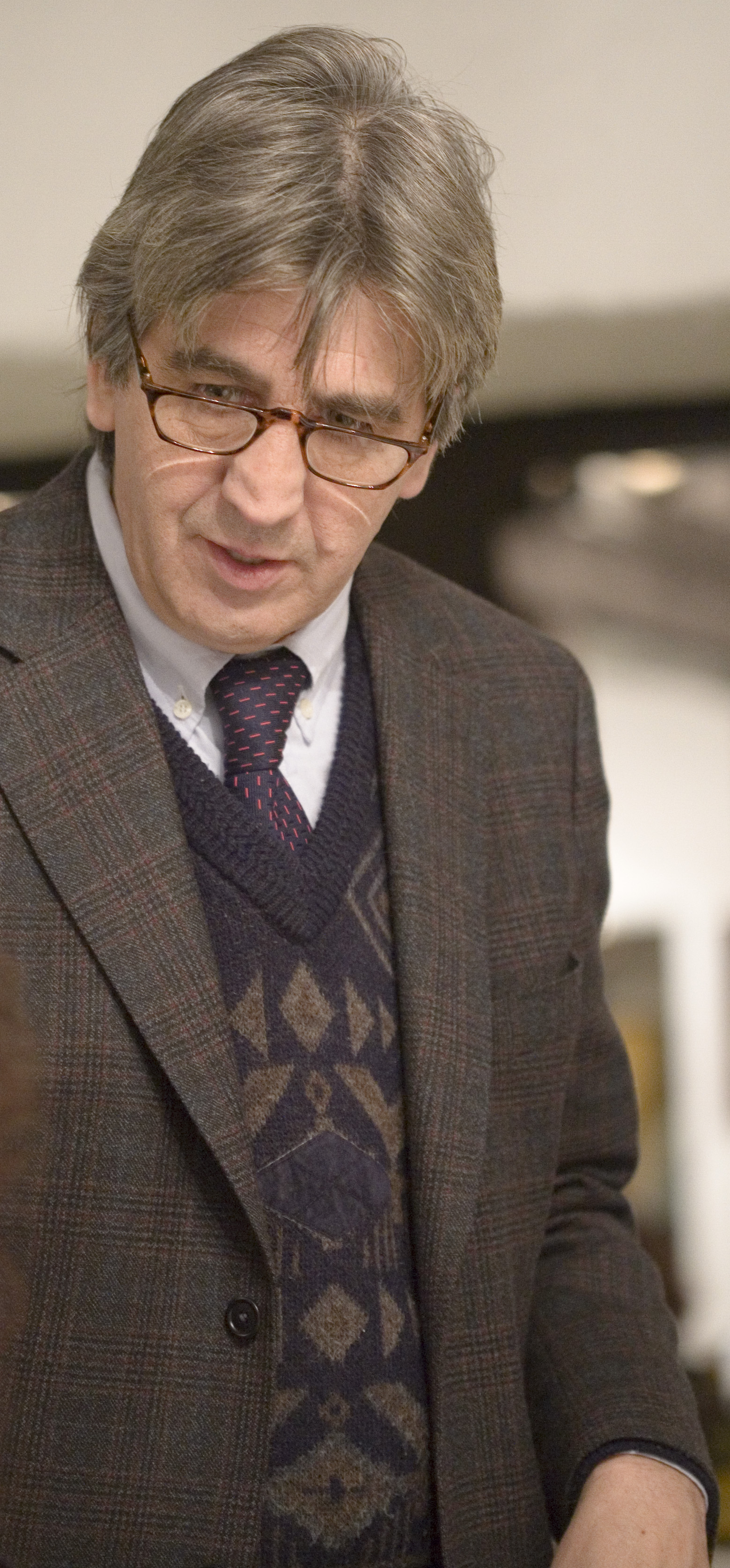

Juli Soler Lobo (31 May 1949 – 6 July 2015) was an entrepreneur from Spain. He was the co-owner and manager of elBulli, a world famous restaurant in Cala Montjoi, Roses, Girona.

== Early life and career ==
Soler began working in the food industry at the age of 13, as an assistant waiter. In 1981, he was offered the position as a general manager at elBulli. He was largely responsible for the success of elBulli. He was responsible for hiring French chef, Jean-Paul Vinay who eventually helped the restaurant to gain its second Michelin star. In 1984, he also hired Ferran Adrià as chef, who later went on to become a celebrity chef and author. In 1990, Soler and Adrià became business partners and bought elBulli.

He died of degenerative nerve disease in 2015, at the age of 66.
