= Elena Arzak =

Spanish chef

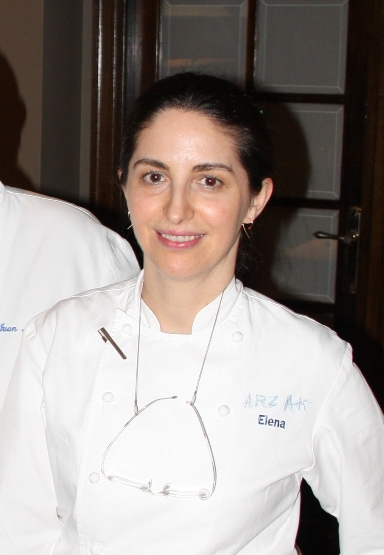
- Born: Elena Arzak Espina; 4 July 1969 (age 57); San Sebastián, Basque Country, Spain
- Culinary career
- Cooking style: New Basque cuisine
- Rating: Michelin stars
- Current restaurant: Arzak
- Awards won: Veuve Clicquot World's Best Female Chef 2012; SECOND

Elena Arzak (born 4 July 1969) is a Basque chef. She is joint head chef of three Michelin-starred restaurant Arzak alongside her father, Juan Mari Arzak, and was named best Female Chef in the World in 2012.

== Biography ==
She first started working at her family's restaurant, Arzak, at the age of 11, becoming the fourth generation of her family to work there. She would work two hours a day during the summer holidays from school. At the time her grandmother was the head chef. Her father is Juan Mari Arzak, who initially worked under his mother at the restaurant, but went on to become head chef himself.

Her father sent her abroad to train at other restaurants after she attended hotel school in Lucerne in Switzerland. She worked at Le Gavroche in London for six months in 1989 under Albert Roux, and alongside Michel Roux Jr. who was also training at the time. She also trained at La Maison Troisgros, Le Louis XV under Alain Ducasse, Restaurant Pierre Gagnaire and returned to Spain when she worked at elBulli.

She became joint head chef of her family's restaurant alongside her father. In 2011, she appeared at The Restaurant Show in London, England. As well as conducting a cooking demonstration, she officially opened the show alongside Rachel Quigley. She has ruled out opening a second restaurant for the time being, but said "I won't say never".

In June 2020, she and other chefs, as well as architects, Nobel laureates in Economics and leaders of international organizations, signed the appeal in favour of the purple economy (“Towards a cultural renaissance of the economy”), published in Corriere della Sera, El País and Le Monde.

=== Awards ===
In 2011, she was nominated for Restaurant's Veuve Clicquot award for World's Best Female Chef, but it was awarded to Anne-Sophie Pic. However, Arzak went on to win the award in 2012.

== Personal life ==
Arzak has two children, Nora and Mateo. She can speak four languages, including German.
