= Deconstructed cuisine =

Experimental culinary style

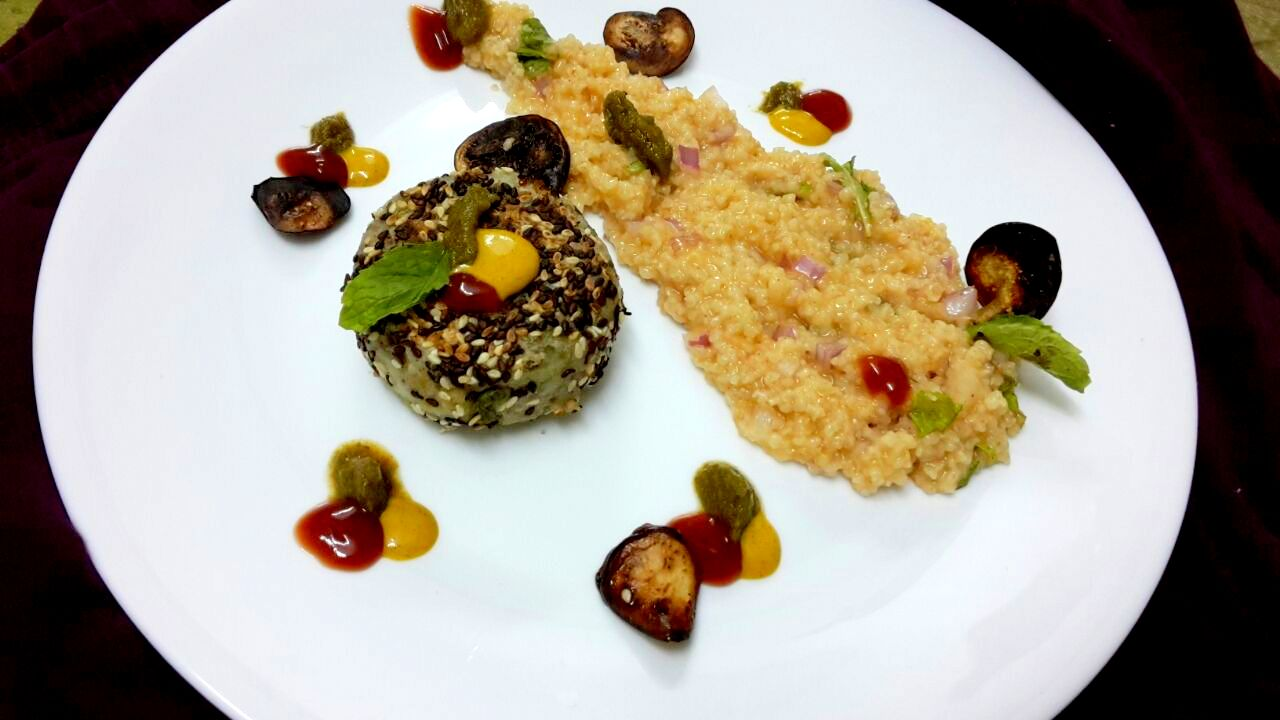
The bun, filling, and sauces of a common veggie burger, deconstructed as separate elements of a single assembly.

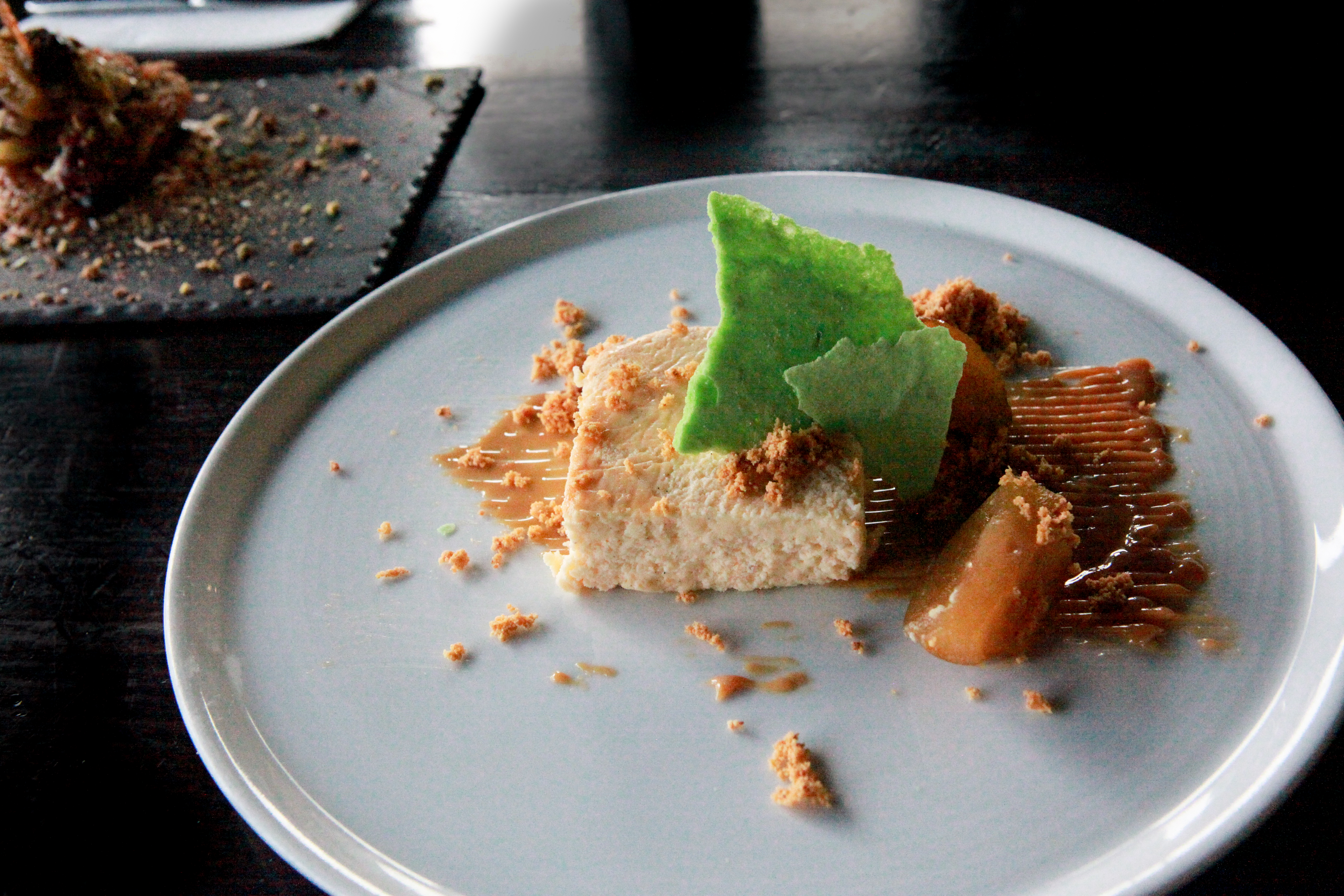
A deconstructed cheesecake

Deconstructed cuisine, or deconstructivism, is a style and theory of experimental cuisine which seeks to deconstruct the cooking and preparation of food, drawing both from the scientific study of molecular gastronomy and from the culinary arts. Deconstructed recipes typically preserve the core ingredients and techniques of an established dish, but prepare components of a dish separately while experimenting radically with its flavor, texture, ratios, and assembly to culminate in a stark, minimalist style of presentation, with similarly minimal portion sizes.

A deconstructed salad, for example, might present its ingredients as separate portions on a single plate rather than mixed together, while a deconstructed sandwich might minimize or omit the role of bread in favor combining the interior ingredients directly into an almost salad-like presentation. Ferran Adrià was a leading figure in the technique. Noteworthy dishes pioneered by Adrià himself include his potato omelette, which consists of onion jam, liquid egg, and potato foam layered atop one another in a milkshake glass.

== History and reception ==
Adrià coined "deconstructivist" as a culinary style in reference to the semiotic theory of the same name proposed by Jacques Derrida in order to distinguish his own cooking from the practice of molecular gastronomy, which he does not identify with, though his cooking has been similarly noted for extremely precise measurements in almost laboratory-like conditions. Adrià instead cited Salvador Dalí and Antoni Gaudí, both native to Adrià's own Spain, as influences for the creative and visual aspects of deconstructed cooking. Deconstruction draws attention to the roles of the cook and the diner, necessitating the latter to "reconstruct" the dish from its original flavor profile.

Writing for a Spanish culinary industry publication, Chef Paco Roncero credited Adrià's deconstruction with innovations such as gelification and the use of foam, emphasizing the style's focus on originality and flavor. Roncero noted that the small portions and visual flair of deconstructed dishes make for excellent appetizers, starters, and desserts, encouraging other chefs to continue experimenting with the style and suggesting that even the name and description of a dish presented in a conventional menu can also be reimagined to further the feelings of surprise and novelty inherent in a deconstructed dining experience.

== See also ==
- Modernist Cuisine
- Conceptual art
- Deconstructivism (architecture)
- Surrealism
- Reconstructivism
