= Albert Adrià =

Spanish cook

Albert Adrià i Acosta
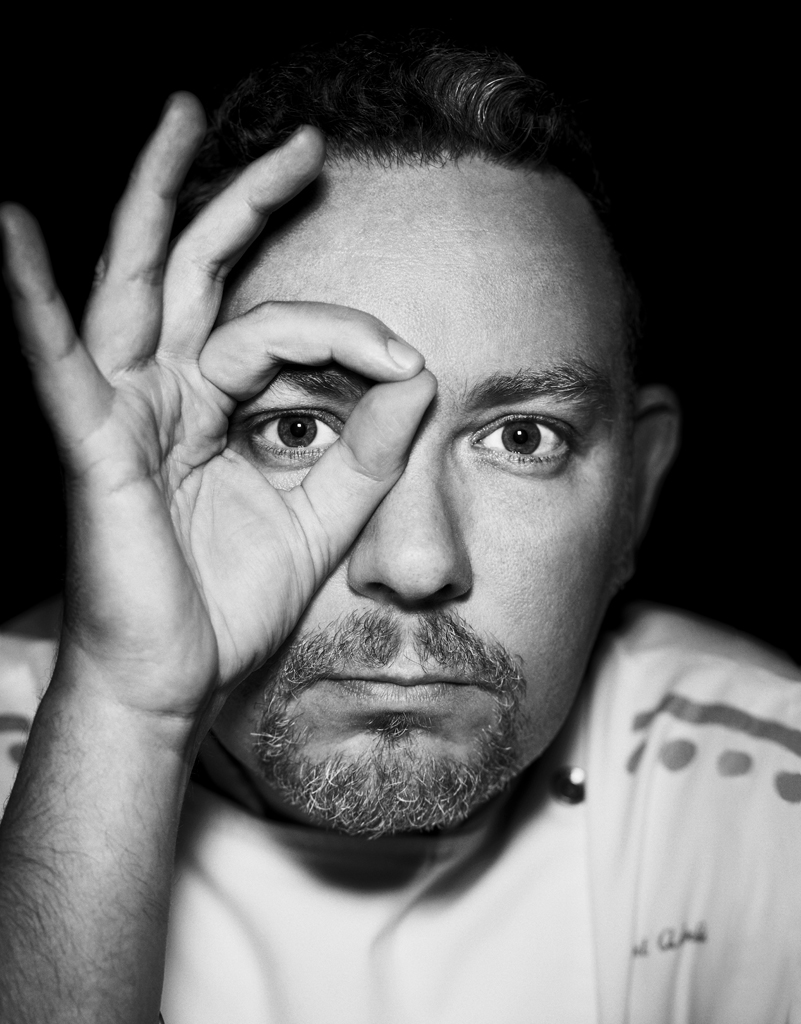
- Albert posing for Food Revolution (2013)
- Born: October 20, 1969 (age 56); L'Hospitalet de Llobregat, Barcelona, Catalonia, Spain
- Education: Apprenticeship
- Culinary career
- Cooking style: Haute cuisine; molecular gastronomy; pastries
- Rating: Michelin stars
- Current restaurants: Enigma; Gelato Collection; Cakes & Bubbles; Mercado Little Spain
- Previous restaurants: elBulli (Pastry Chef); Tickets; Hoja Santa; Pakta; Bodega 1900; Niño Viejo
- Award(s) won: The World's 50 Best 2015 Best Pastry Chef – elBulli

Albert Adrià Acosta (Note: Catalan names were illegal during the Francoist dictatorship, and so the Spanish State only recognized the castilianized name Alberto Adrián Acosta during this period.) (Catalan pronunciation: [əlˈβɛɾt əðɾiˈaj əˈkɔstə]; born 20 October 1969) is a Spanish chef. He is currently head chef of Enigma, a Michelin two-star restaurant in Barcelona and was formerly the head pastry chef of El Bulli, in Roses on the Costa Brava. He has often collaborated with his brother, renowned chef Ferran Adrià.

== Biography ==
Albert Adrià's interest in cuisine first began thanks to his parents, Ginés and Josefa, but it was his brother Ferran who inspired him to explore food as a career. In 1985, he left his studies to begin working at elBulli. After two years of apprenticeship, he started to focus his interest on pâtisserie. He completed his education in various pâtisseries alongside great pastry chefs such as Antoni Escribà and Francisco Torreblanca. In late 1998, he began working on a creativity workshop at the headquarters of Bullicatering. The Bullitaller consisted of a table, some books and two chairs, one for him and the other for Oriol Castro. The workshop quickly gained in importance for the creative development of elBulli, so it moved to a new location in the centre of Barcelona. Until 2008, Albert Adrià worked as the director of the Bullitaller and was responsible for desserts at elBulli.

In March 2006, Adrià opened Inopia Classic Bar in Barcelona, a bar serving modernised traditional tapas. Many identify Inopia as the first gastrobar in Spain.

In 2009, he released his second solo book, Natura, and directed the documentary Un día en El Bulli, which won awards at several festivals.

In July 2010, he left the Inopia bar, which would be renamed Lolita taperia, to concentrate on his new project, Tickets.

In January 2011, he opened 41º, located on Avinguda del Paral·lel in Barcelona, which operated both as a cocktail bar and later as a 16-seat restaurant only open in the evening, with a tasting menu and cocktails. At the same time, he launched Tickets alongside his brother Ferran and the Iglesias brothers, the owners of the Barcelona seafood restaurant Rías de Galicia.

In 2013, Albert Adrià opened Pakta, a nikkei (Peruvian-Japanese fusion cuisine) restaurant on Carrer de Lleida (Poble Sec, Barcelona).

In September 2013, Adrià's fourth concept opened, Bodega 1900, a vermouth bar where apéritifs are the crux of a menu for diners seated at tables or at the bar, located on Carrer Tamarit in Barcelona, just in front of Tickets. In November of the same year, he published his third book, Tapas. La cocina del Tickets.

From 2013, Constructing Albert was filmed, a documentary exploring Adrià's life as an inventive chef and businessman throughout the creation of his various gastronomic concepts and personal projects.

In 2014, he opened a double restaurant, Niño viejo, a Mexican street food taquería, and Hoja Santa, a gourmet Mexican restaurant on Avinguda Mistral in Barcelona.

In February 2015, Albert and his brother Ferran partnered with Cirque du Soleil for their Heart project, a multi-purpose space in Ibiza uniting art, gastronomy and music.

In 2015, he founded La Cala Albert Adrià, a company specialised in selected apéritif products.

In February 2015, Adrià arrived in London with his team for a 50-day residency at the iconic Hotel Café Royal, 50 Days by Albert Adrià, where he adapted local products and dishes to his personal style.

In June 2016, he opened his new project, Enigma, a labyrinthine space for only 24 diners on Carrer Sepúlveda, the evolution of his previous 41º bar, the latest establishment opened in the Paral·lel area of the group of restaurants known as elBarri.

== Awards ==
- Recognised as one of the 13 most influential people in the world of gastronomy and food by Time magazine in 2013.
- In November 2013, at the gala held in Bilbao, Albert Adrià received the double recognition of receiving a Michelin star for the restaurant Tickets and another for 41º.
- In November 2014, Pakta received the only Michelin star granted to a restaurant in Catalonia, but 41º lost its star due to closing.
- In November 2015, the Mexican restaurant Hoja Santa (Albert Adrià's collaboration with chef Paco Méndez) received its first Michelin star.
- In June 2015, British fine dining magazine Restaurant named Adrià the World's Best Pastry Chef, and Tickets made its way into the magazine's list of the World's 50 Best Restaurants for the first time, in 42nd place.
- In November 2017, Enigma received a Michelin star.
- In 2018, Tickets appeared in 25th place on the list of the World's 50 Best Restaurants from Restaurant magazine.

== Publications ==
- El Bulli 1994-1997 (with Ferran Adrià and Juli Soler). New York City: Ecco, 2006, ISBN 9780061146671
- El Bulli 1998-2002 (with Ferran Adrià and Juli Soler). New York City: Ecco, 2005, ISBN 0-06-081757-7
- El Bulli 2003-2004 (with Ferran Adrià and Juli Soler). New York City: Ecco, 2006, ISBN 0-06-114668-4
- Los postres de el Bulli. Barcelona: Ediciones Peninsula, 1998, ISBN 9788483071533
- Natura. Barcelona: RBA, 2008, ISBN 9788498673487
- A Day at elBulli (with Ferran Adrià and Juli Soler). London: Phaidon Press, 2008, ISBN 9780714848839
- Tapas, la cocina del Tickets. Barcelona, RBA, 2013, ISBN 9788490560051
- Cooking coffee: Albert Adrià for Lavazza. Barcelona: Montagud Editores, 2015. ISBN 9788472121553
- Tickets Evolution. Barcelona: RBA, 2018. ISBN 9788490569146
