= Anne-Sophie Pic =

French chef (born 1969)

- Anne-Sophie Pic in 2021
- Born: 12 July 1969 (age 57); Valence, Drôme, France
- Spouse: David Sinapian
- Children: 1
- Culinary career
- Cooking style: Haute cuisine
- Ratings
- Michelin stars AA Rosettes
- Current restaurants
- Maison Pic; Restaurant Anne-Sophie Pic; La Dame de Pic (Paris); La Dame de Pic (Dubai); La Dame de Pic - Le 1920; Anne Sophie Pic at Le Normandie -
- Award
- Veuve Clicquot World's Best Female Chef 2011
- Website: www.pic-valence.fr

Anne-Sophie Pic (French pronunciation: [an sɔfi pik], born 12 July 1969) is a French chef best known for regaining the third Michelin star for her restaurant Maison Pic, in southeast France. She is the fourth female chef to win three Michelin stars, and was named the Best Female Chef by The World's 50 Best Restaurants in 2011. She currently holds 10 Michelin stars, the most for any female chef.

== Biography ==
Anne-Sophie Pic was born in Valence, Drôme, in France on 12 July 1969. She is the daughter of chef Jacques Pic, and grew up at her family's restaurant, Maison Pic. Her grandfather, Andre Pic, was also a chef, who was particularly known for a crayfish gratin dish, and who first gained the restaurant three Michelin stars in 1934. She initially decided not to follow in their footsteps, and instead travelled overseas to train in management. She worked in Japan and the United States as an intern for various companies, including Cartier and Moët & Chandon, but found herself drawn back to the restaurant for her "passion".

In 1992, at the age of 23, she returned to Maison Pic to train under her father to become a chef. He died three months later, and she moved to working the front of the house. In 1995, the restaurant lost its third Michelin star; feeling she had lost "her father's star" spurred her to return to the kitchen. In 1997, Pic took control of the restaurant. She had no formal training in cooking.

In 2007, she regained Maison Pic's three Michelin stars. This was only the fourth time ever that a female chef had achieved three Michelin stars. That same year, Pic was the only woman on French newspaper Le Figaro's list of the top twenty richest chefs in France.

She opened her second restaurant, Restaurant Anne-Sophie Pic, in Lausanne, Switzerland. It was awarded two Michelin stars in 2009, which it has retained ever since, and is located within the Beau-Rivage Palace hotel. In September 2012, she opened her first Paris-based restaurant, La Dame de Pic. The restaurant has received one Michelin star.

Pic is married to David Sinapian and has a son named Nathan.

In 2015 and 2016, Pic was a member of the Prix Versailles judges panel.

In 2017, Pic opened her first London restaurant, also called La Dame de Pic, in the Four Seasons Hotel at 10 Trinity Square in the City of London. It was awarded a Michelin star within less than a year of opening for the 2018 Michelin Guide. A second star followed for the 2020 Guide, and both have been retained since.

In 2018, she appeared as a judge on the "France" episode and in the finale of The Final Table, season 1. In the same year she was profiled in Maya Gallus's documentary film The Heat: A Kitchen (R)evolution.

In 2019, she opened a restaurant, also under the name La Dame de Pic, in the Raffles Hotel in Singapore. It was awarded one Michelin star in the 2022 Guide. The restaurant closed in 2024.

In June 2020, she and other chefs, as well as architects, Nobel laureates in Economics and leaders of international organizations, signed the appeal in favour of the purple economy ("Towards a cultural renaissance of the economy"), published in Corriere della Sera, El País and Le Monde.

At the end of 2020, she opened another restaurant called La Dame de Pic - Le 1920 at the Four Seasons Hotel in Megève, France. It was awarded its first Michelin star in the 2022 Guide.

In summer 2021, during the COVID-19 pandemic, she launched a food truck in Valence called Pic-up, featuring her first time offering hamburgers.

In September of 2025, she re-opened in collaboration with Mandarin Oriental Bangkok, Chef Anne Sophie Pic at Le Normandie. Taking over the historic french fine dining restaurant. Le Normandie regained 2 Michelin Stars in 2026.

She opened the two-starred Cristal Room by Anne-Sophie Pic in 2025, in collaboration with Baccarat, located in the Landmark, Hong Kong.

== Michelin-starred restaurants associated with Anne-Sophie Pic and their highest rating ==
Key
1 Michelin star	One Michelin star
2 Michelin stars	Two Michelin stars
3 Michelin stars	Three Michelin stars

Name	Location	Rating
Pic	Valence, France	3 Michelin stars
Pic Beau-Rivage Palace (2024–present)	Lausanne, Switzerland	2 Michelin stars
La Dame de Pic	Paris, France	1 Michelin star
La Dame de Pic - Le 1920	Megève, France	1 Michelin star
La Dame de Pic	Dubai, UAE	1 Michelin star
Cristal Room by La Dame de Pic	Hong Kong	2 Michelin stars
Anne Sophie Pic at Le Normandie	Bangkok, Thailand	2 Michelin stars

=== Closed restaurants ===
Name	Location	Rating
Anne-Sophie Pic (2009–2023)	Lausanne, Switzerland	2 Michelin stars
La Dame de Pic (2017–2025)	London, United Kingdom	2 Michelin stars
La Dame de Pic (2019–2024)	Singapore	1 Michelin star

== Awards ==
In 2011, she received the Veuve Clicquot World's Best Female Chef award, named after Madame Clicquot Ponsardin and given by the World's 50 Best Restaurants awards scheme from British magazine Restaurant. It was the first time the category had been awarded, and it was thought to have been closely fought between Pic, Elena Arzak and Nadia Santini. At the time of the award, Pic was the only three Michelin starred female chef in France.

On 14 July 2011, she was named a Chevalier (Knight) of the French Legion of Honour.

In 2009, Pic received the Eckart Witzigmann Award for excellent culinary art.
