= Pacojet =

Swiss professional kitchen company

Pacojet International AG
- Company type: Subsidiary
- Industry: Professional cooking appliances
- Founded: 1988; 38 years ago
- Headquarters: Rotkreuz, Switzerland
- Area served: Worldwide
- Products: Pacojet systems
- Parent: Groupe SEB
- Website: pacojet.com

Pacojet International AG is a Swiss company that manufactures and sells the Pacojet, a professional kitchen appliance that micro-purees deep-frozen foods into ultra-fine textures (such as sorbets, ice creams, farces, mousses, sauces, soups, concentrates, doughs and masses) without thawing.

Pacojet systems are sold worldwide for hotel, restaurant and catering gastronomy. The company is headquartered in Rotkreuz, Switzerland and is supported by a network of importers and distributors around the world.

On May 5, 2023, French company Groupe SEB acquired Pacojet.

== History ==
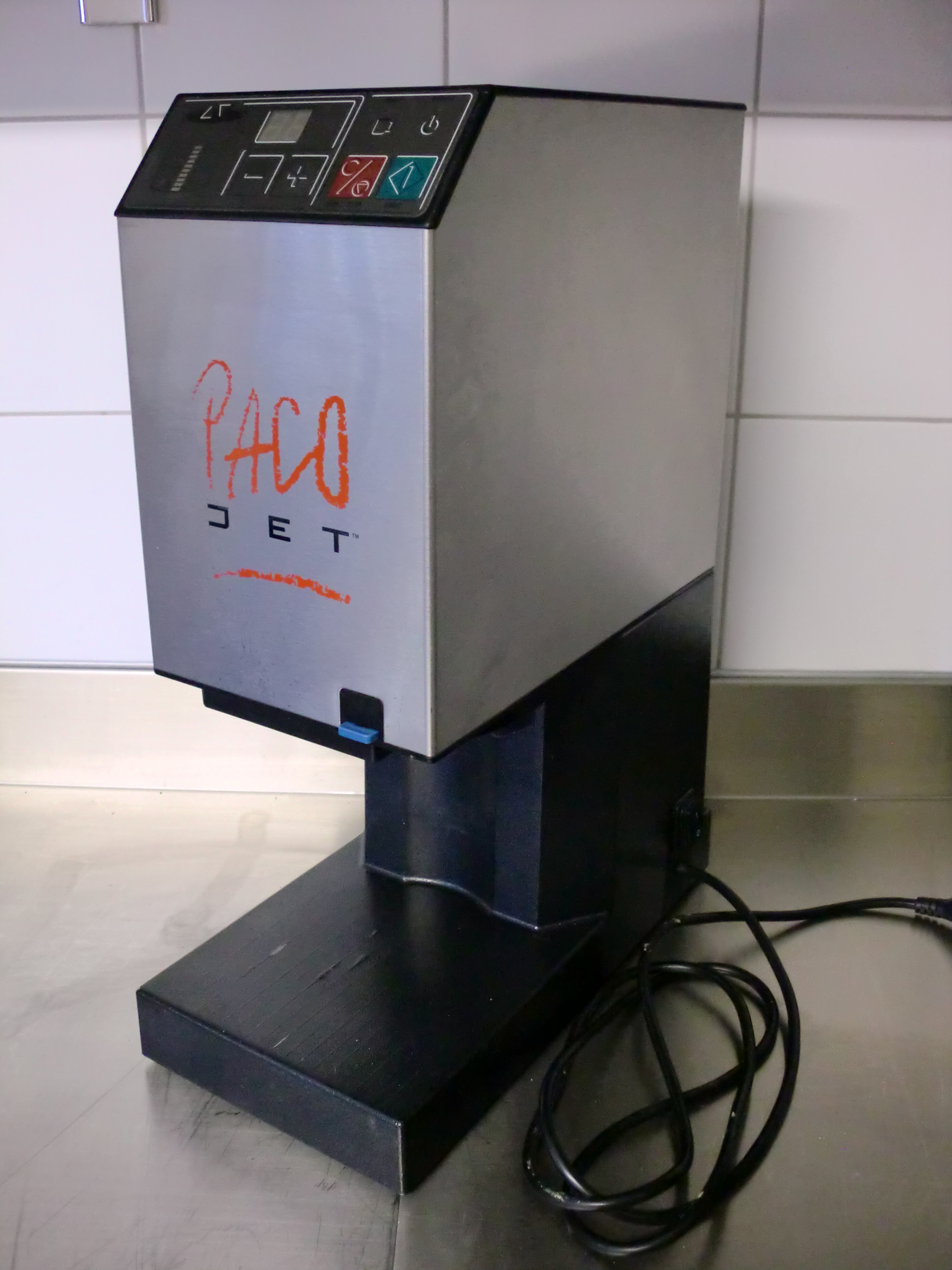
A Pacojet system on a countertop

The Pacojet was invented by Swiss engineer Wilhelm Maurer in the early 1980s by adapting a drill press to function as an ice cream maker.

The Pacojet was introduced in Europe in 1992. It was first test marketed in the United States in 1996 and became available the following year.

In 2012, the Pacojet 2 was introduced, the first major redesign of the appliance, and featured a redesigned motor, additional sensors, and a touchscreen interface. Pacojet Junior, a lower-cost model, was introduced in 2017. Pacojet 2 Plus was introduced in 2018 and featured a repeat function. In October 2022, timed to commemorate the company's 30th anniversary, the Pacojet 4 was released, with new features including a large touchscreen with a animated user assistance.

== Operation ==
Ingredients are placed into the Pacojet beaker and frozen for at least 24 hours at −22 °C (−8 °F). The beaker is then attached to the Pacojet machine and the number of portions desired is selected. Its blade spins downward at 2,000 revolutions a minute, shaving a micro-thin layer off the top of the block of deep-frozen ingredients. This process is called "pacotizing", a verb coined to describe the unique function of the Pacojet. The Pacojet operates in a sealed mode with a pressure of 1.2 bars (17 psi) The Pacojet produces smaller ice crystals than traditional ice cream makers, resulting in smoother and creamier textures.

== In the press ==
In the 21st century, the Pacojet has been lauded by chefs and food writers. It has remained uncommon outside of commercial kitchens, in part due to its high cost.

SharkNinja released the Ninja Creami ice cream maker in 2022, which Wired referred to as a "fairly shameless (and much cheaper) knockoff of a Pacojet" in its review.
