= Jacques Pic =

French chef (1932–1992)

- Born: October 31, 1932
- Died: September 19, 1992 (aged 59); Valence, Drôme, France
- Culinary career
- Cooking style: Haute cuisine
- Rating: Michelin stars
- Previous restaurants: Maison Pic; SECOND

Jacques Pic (October 31, 1932 – September 19, 1992) was a French chef best known for being head chef at his three Michelin-starred restaurant Maison Pic in Valence, Drôme, France. He was the son of chef Andre Pic, and the father of chefs Alain and Anne-Sophie Pic.

== Early life ==
Jacques was the son of Andre Pic, a chef who worked at his family's restaurant Des Pins in the hills above Valence, Drôme. The restaurant was moved into the town to become Maison Pic when Jacques was two years old and won three Michelin stars by the time he was seven. Jacques saw the impact the work was having on his father's health and decided that he did not want to become a chef and instead aimed to become a car mechanic. The restaurant lost its third star in 1946, but after it lost its second star in 1950 and seeing that his father had no successor to take over from him, Jacques decided to train as a chef in order to take over at the restaurant and earn back those stars for his father and his family.

== Career ==
As his father Andre was held in high esteem, Jacques applied to work in the kitchens of Fernand Point and Alexandre Dumaine, who were considered his father's equals in the kitchen. Both chefs turned down Jacques' application. He instead travelled to Geneva, Switzerland, and to a variety of towns and cities in France, picking up culinary skills on the way. During his French national service, he was sent to Algeria.

Upon returning to Maison Pic, he introduced an eight-course tasting menu, becoming one of the first chefs in the nouvelle cuisine movement to expand upon the traditional three-course meal. In 1959, he won back the second Michelin star for the restaurant and restored the third in 1973. His father died in 1983, seeing those stars returned to the restaurant and kept.

On 19 September 1992, Jacques Pic died from a heart attack at the age of 59 whilst working at the stove at Maison Pic. His son Alain succeeded him as head chef. As of 2012 his daughter Anne-Sophie Pic is head chef of the family's restaurant.
