= Sorrel (restaurant) =

Restaurant in San Francisco, California, U.S.

- Interactive map of Sorrel

Restaurant information
- Location: 3228 Sacramento Street, San Francisco, California, 94115, United States
- Coordinates: 37°47′18″N 122°26′46″W

Sorrel is a Michelin-starred restaurant in San Francisco, California, United States.

== See also ==
- List of Michelin-starred restaurants in California
