= Maison Pic =

Restaurant in Drôme, France

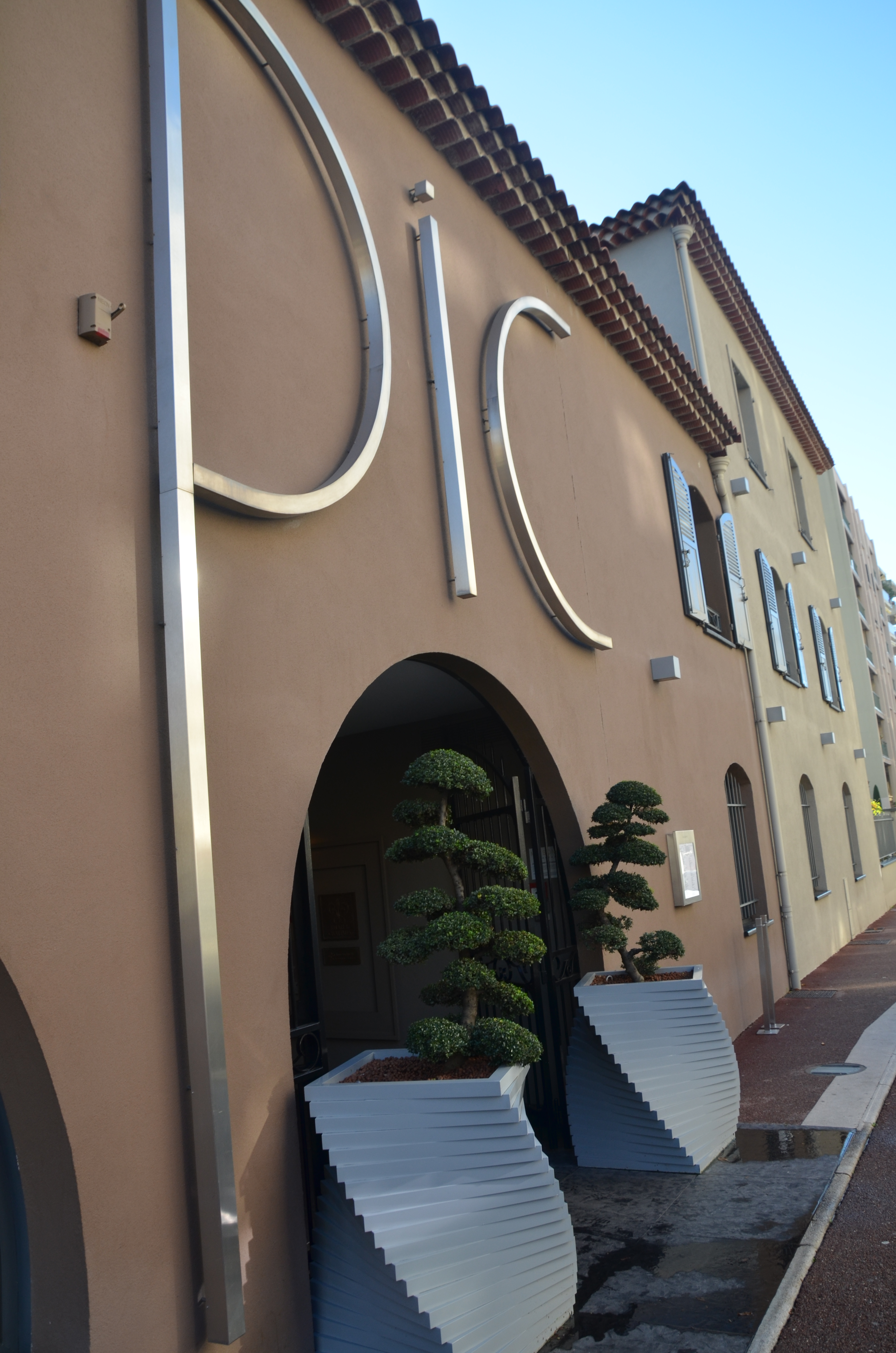

- Location in France

General information
- Location: Valence, Drôme, France
- Coordinates: 44°55′3″N 4°53′8″E
- Opening: 1889; 137 years ago
- Owner: Anne-Sophie Pic

Other information
- Number of rooms: 16
- Number of suites: 5
- Number of restaurants: 1

Website
- www.pic-valence.com

Maison Pic is an upscale hotel and restaurant located in Valence, Drôme, France. Established in 1889 by Eugene and Sophie Pic, the restaurant first earned the prestigious 3 Michelin stars in 1939 under their son André Pic (1893–1984). The rating was downgraded to two stars in 1946 and further reduced to one star in 1950. André's son Jacques Pic, who initially did not want to become a chef, decided to train as a chef in order to eventually take over from his father with the goal of regaining the stars. Under Jacques' leadership, the restaurant regained its second star in 1959 and its third in 1973. It maintained this top rating until 1995, three years after Jacques' passing, when it was demoted to two stars. In 1997, Jacques' daughter Anne-Sophie Pic took over the restaurant from her brother Alain Pic. Maison Pic regained a three-star rating in 2007. Pic is the only female chef in France to hold three Michelin stars.

The chefs of the Pic provided for the "Culinary Master Series 2005". The restaurant has a display of every edition of the Michelin Guide since 1933.

== See also ==
- List of Michelin-starred restaurants
