= Can Fabes =

Coordinates: 41°41′23″N 2°29′38″E

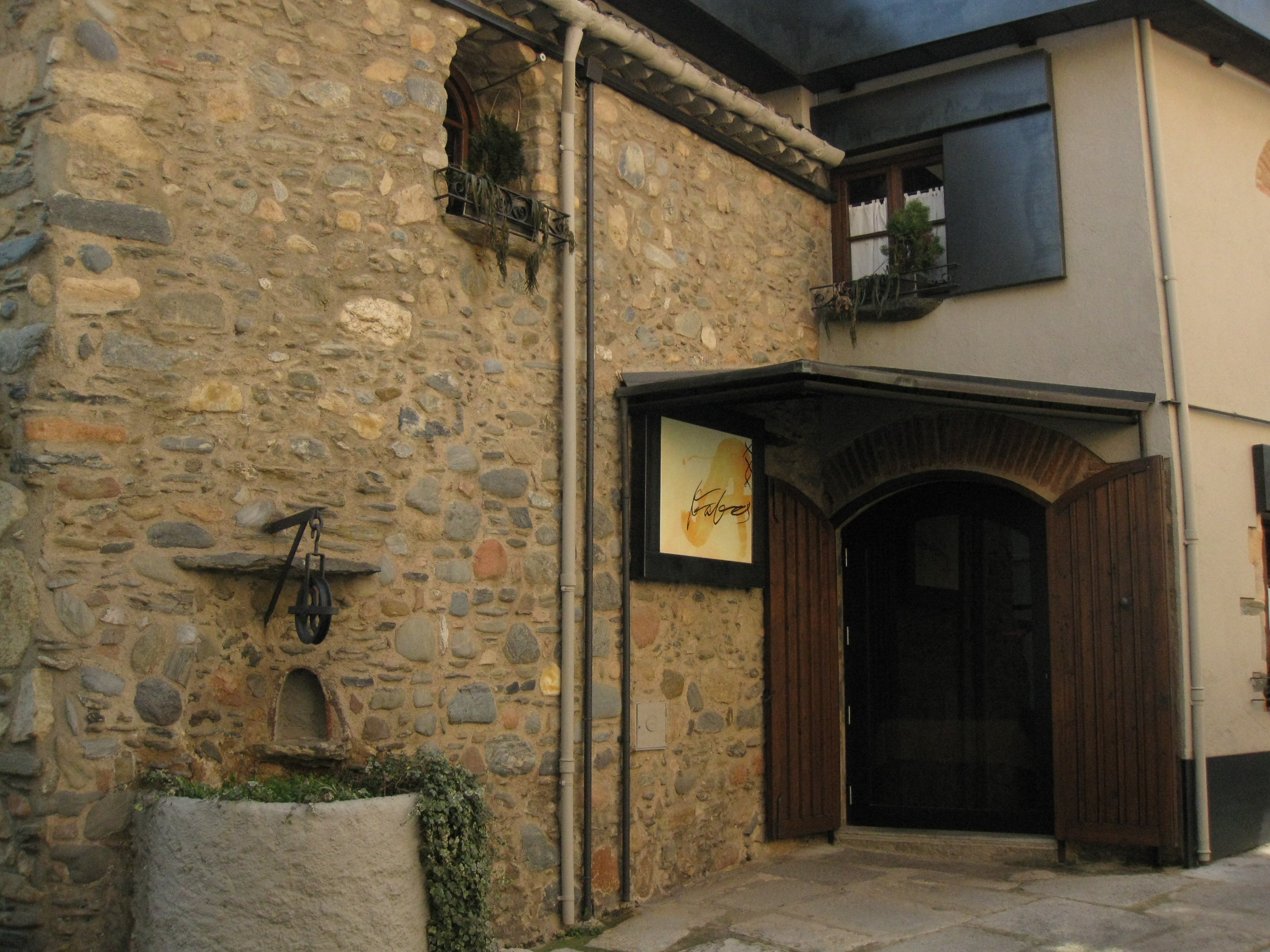
- Interactive map of Can Fabes

Restaurant information
- Head chef: Santi Santamaria
- Food type: Catalan; haute cuisine
- Rating: (Michelin Guide)
- Location: Sant Joan, 6, Sant Celoni, 08470, Spain
- Website: www.canfabes.com

Can Fabes was a restaurant close to Barcelona, in Sant Celoni, Catalonia, Spain. The chef was Santi Santamaria, who was the first Catalan cook ever to get 3 Michelin stars. Santamaria has been the president of Relais Gourmands and vice president of Relais & Chateaux (2003-2006). Can Fabes was a member of Relais & Châteaux starting in 1989. The premises have belonged to Santamaria's family for 200 years, and he himself was born there.

Can Fabes opened in 1981 as an informal bistro serving meals to peasants who came to the local market. It was awarded its first Michelin star in 1988 and the second one in 1990.

The restaurant was voted 31st best in the world in Restaurant Top 50 in 2008.

Can Fabes was awarded three Michelin stars in 1994.

Can Fabes closed after 32 years, in August 2013.
