= Juan Mari Arzak =

Spanish Basque chef from San Sebastián

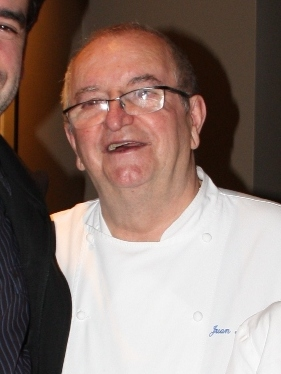
- circa 2010
- Born: Juan Mari Arzak Arratibel; 31 July 1942 (age 83); San Sebastián, Basque Country, Spain
- Culinary career
- Cooking style: New Basque cuisine
- Rating: Michelin stars
- Current restaurant: Arzak (San Sebastián, Spain)
- Award(s) won: Universal Basque, 2008

Juan Mari Arzak Arratibel (born 31 July 1942) is a Spanish chef, the owner and chef of Arzak restaurant. He is considered to be one of the great masters of New Basque cuisine. He describes his cooking as "signature cuisine, Basque cuisine that's evolutionary, investigatory, and avant-garde."

== Personal life ==
Arzak was the only child born to Juan Ramon Arzak and Francisca Arratibel in San Sebastián, Spain. He spent much of his childhood in his grandparents' restaurant. Later, Arzak's parents took over control of the restaurant. Arzak's father died in 1951, after which time his mother continued to run the restaurant until he took over control of the restaurant. Arzak has two daughters, Marta and Elena, with Maite Espina.

== Professional life ==
Arzak said that his interest in cooking began at birth, and that in his childhood he would help in his family's restaurant. However, his real interest in cuisine didn't begin until his time at a hotel management school in Madrid. After Arzak's mandatory time in the military, he returned to his family's restaurant and began training as a chef, during which time he was responsible for roasting meat. Since he took over the restaurant, the restaurant has garnered much praise, and received three Michelin stars in 1989. In 2008 Arzak received the "Universal Basque" award for "adapting gastronomy, one of the most important traditions of the Basque Country, to the new times and making of it one of the most innovative of the world". He trained his daughter Elena Arzak (born 1969), who has won the "Veuve Clicquot World's Best Female Chef" at the "World's 50 Best Restaurant Awards", to take over the restaurant.
