= Brae (restaurant) =

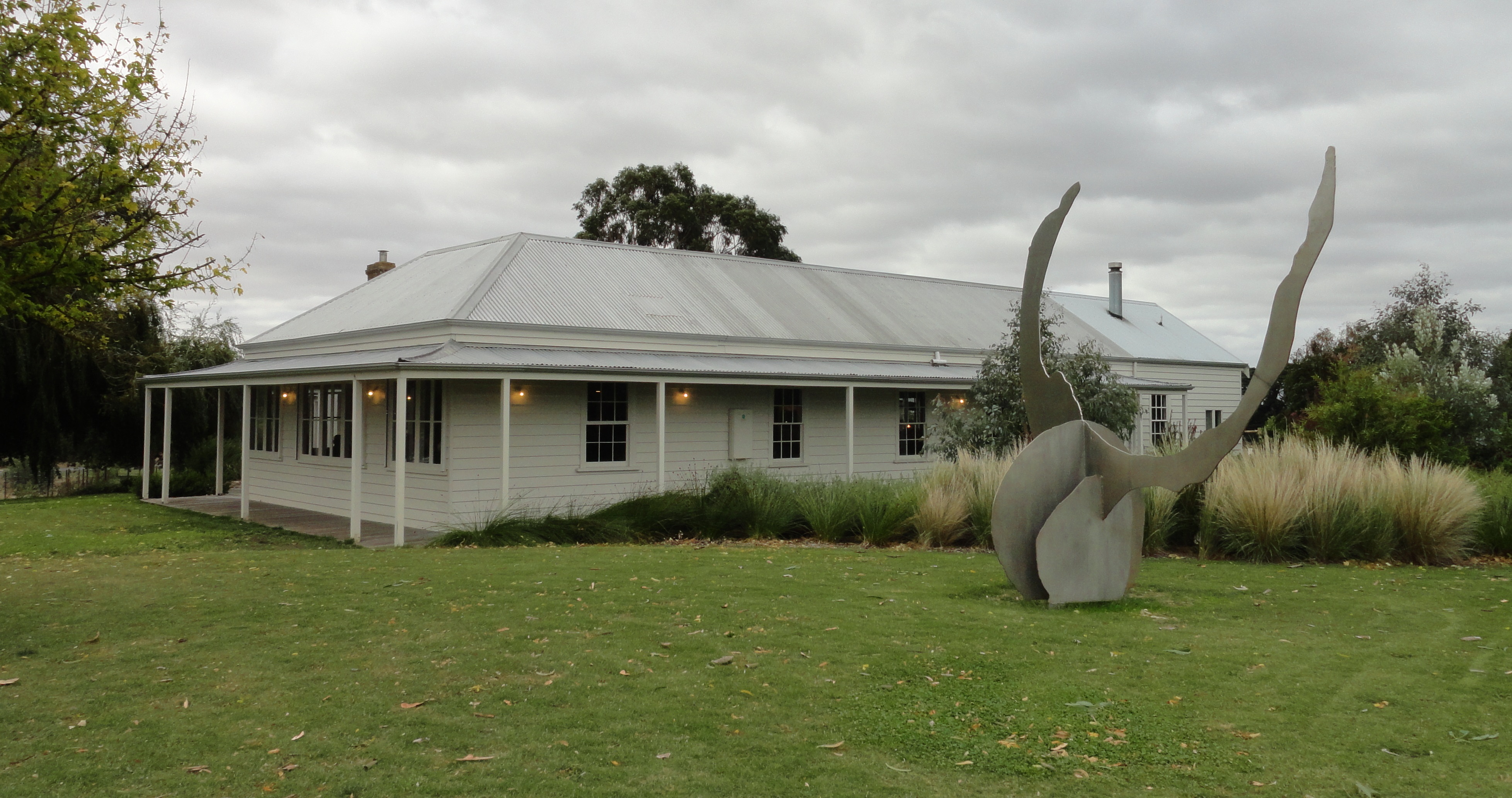
- Interactive map of Brae

Restaurant information
- Established: 2013
- Chef: Dan Hunter
- Location: 4285 Cape Otway Rd, Birregurra, Victoria, Australia
- Coordinates: 38.347°S 143.807°E
- Website: braerestaurant.com

Brae is a restaurant in Birregurra, Victoria, Australia. It was previously the site of Sunnybrae, Diane Garrett and George Biron's home, restaurant and cooking school that they ran from 1981 till 2013. Brae was named at number 44 in The World's 50 Best Restaurants, 2017.

Brae is owned and operated by Dan Hunter, who had previously worked at Mugaritz in Spain and the Royal Mail Restaurant in Dunkeld, Victoria. Brae opened in December 2013.

Brae's menu is driven by its organic kitchen garden, and its menu changes according to seasonal variation. Its signature dish is a parsnip and apple dessert: a "funnel of fried parsnip skin housing a creamy apple-parsnip mousse".
