= Atxondo =

- Municipality
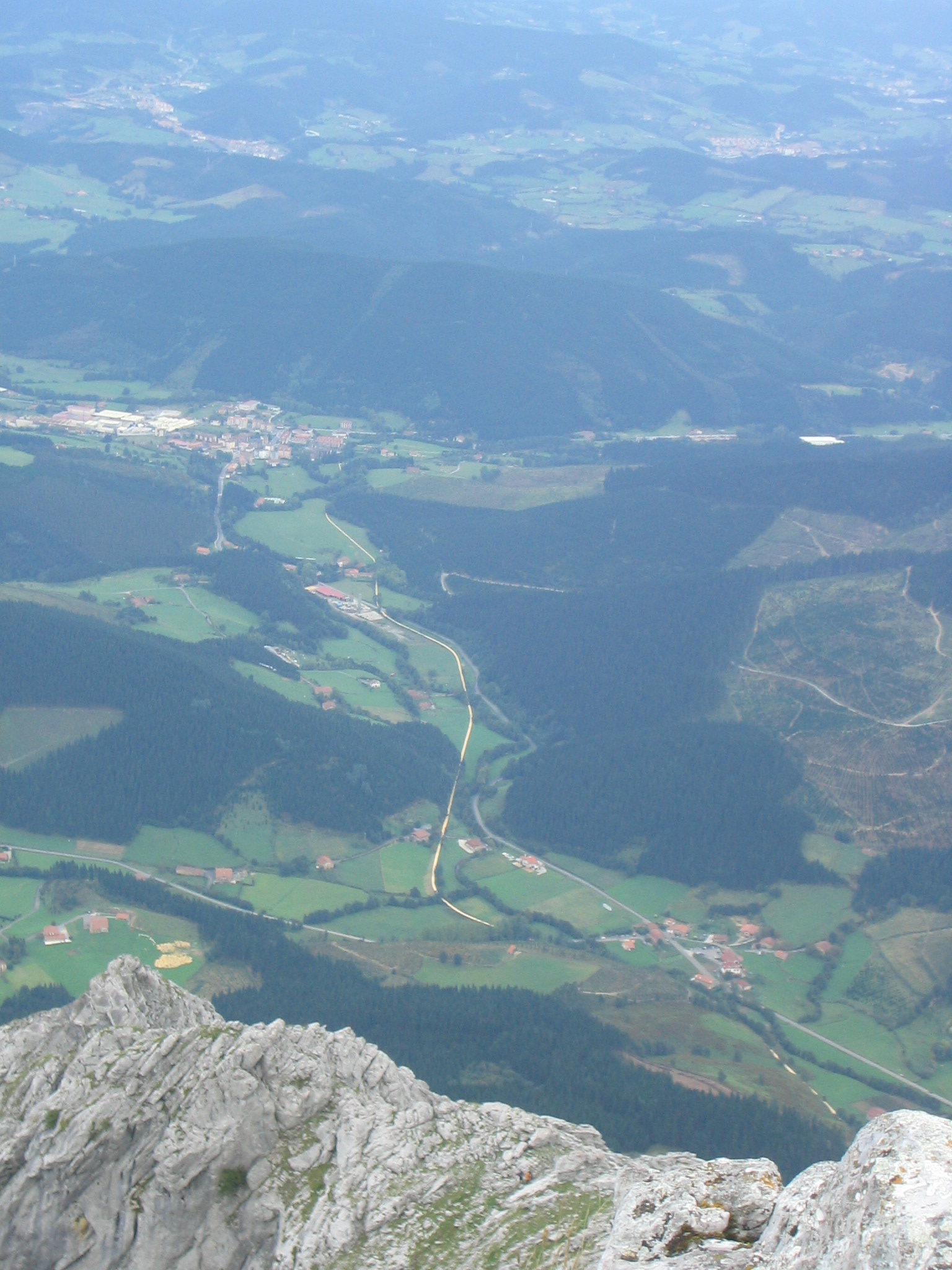
- General overview of the valley of Atxondo

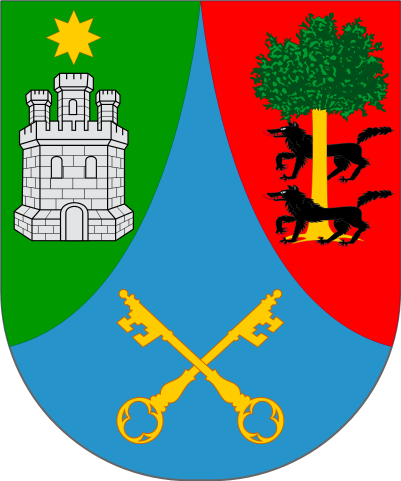
- Coat of arms

- Location of Atxondo within the Basque Country
- Coordinates: 43°07′48″N 2°35′01″W
- Country: Spain
- Autonomous community: País Vasco
- Province: Biscay
- Comarca: Durangaldea
- Established: 1962 (as Atxondo, date of establishment of the original elizates unknown)

Government
  - Mayor: Rosa Maria Elizburu Oyanguren (Bildu)

Area
  - Total: 2,321 km^{2} (896 sq mi)
- Elevation: 170 m (560 ft)

Population (2025-01-01)
  - Total: 1,342
  - Density: 0.5782/km^{2} (1.498/sq mi)
- Demonym: Atxondoarra
- Time zone: UTC+1 (CET)
  - Summer (DST): UTC+2 (CEST)
- Postal code: 48291
- Website: Official website

Atxondo (Spanish: Achondo) is a municipality located in the province of Biscay, in the Basque Country, Spain. Atxondo is part of the comarca of Durangaldea and has a population of 1,447 inhabitants as of 2007 according to the Spanish National Statistics Institute.

Atxondo was formed by the fusion of the former municipalities of the elizates of Apatamonasterio, Arrazola and Axpe in 1962.

== Toponymy ==
The name Atxondo comes from the fusion of the Basque words (h)A(i)tz, which means "rock", and ondo, which means at the side of, then "at the side of the rock". Axpe means "under the rock".

== History ==
Until 1962, Achondo was the name for a valley where three different municipalities formed by three elizates where located; Apatamonasterio, Arrazola and Axpe, each of them with history of its own.

=== Apatamonasterio ===
The name Apatamonasterio means "clergy monastery" and was chosen to differentiate the monastery opened here to the one in the elizate of Etxebarria. It took part on the War of the Bands. As a member of the ancient merindad of Durango, it had voice and right to vote in the Juntas of Guerendiaga, where it occupied the seat number eight. Until 1857 it did not have a church of its own, depending on the one of Abadiño. Historically, its economy has depended on farming.

=== Arrazola ===
It also took part on the War of the Bands and had voice and right to vote in the Juntas of Guerendiaga, where it occupied the seat number eight. In Arrazola was born Esteban de Urizar, governor of Peru during the reign of Philip II and Juan Alexandro Arrazola de Oñate who was Chamberlain of Archduke Albert and Archduchess Isabella in the Spanish Netherlands. In 1510 the church was built with the approval of the Catholic Monarchs.

=== Axpe ===
As the two others, Axpe also took part on the War of the Bands. It had voice and right to vote in the Juntas of Guerendiaga, where it occupied the seat number nine. In 1550 the church was built.

In 1990, Asador Etxebarri opened, which in 2026 was named #1 on the The World's 50 Best Restaurants.

== Geography ==
It is located in the southeasternmost part of the province of Biscay and limits at west with Abadiño, at east with Elorrio and at south with the province of Álava. The Ibaizabal river forms here, when it joins the Zumalegi river, which itself originates in the Anboto mountain.

Atxondo may be divided into two zones; the industrial area formed by Apatamonasterio and the farming and residential areas formed by Axpe, Arrazola and the neighborhoods of Marzana and Santiago. It is located 6 km away from Durango, capital city of the comarca and 36 km away from Bilbao, capital city of the province.

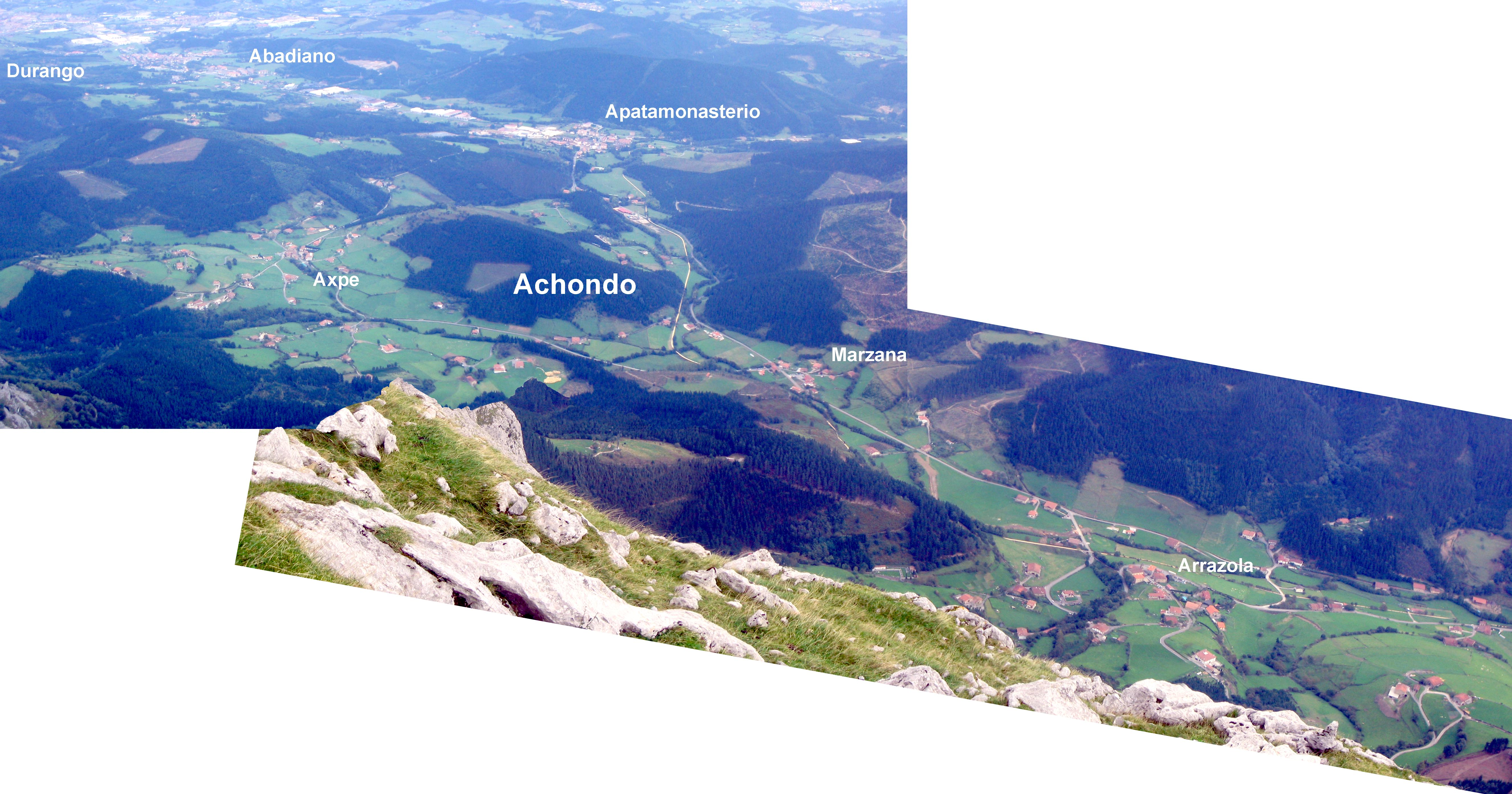
General overview of the valley of Atxondo with the elizates of Apatamonasterio, Axpe and Arrazola. Abadiño and Durango in the back.

== Transport ==
Transport by road is the only mean of transportation in the area. The road BI-634 runs through the valley crossing the neighborhood of Apatamonasterio. That road is part of the Durango-Beasain axis, and connects Durango with Arrasate-Mondragón (in the province of Gipuzkoa). The BI-634 connects in Durango with the N-634 road and the AP-8 highway which connect Bilbao, the capital city of Biscay, with Donostia-San Sebastián, the capital city of Gipuzkoa.

In Arrasate-Mondragón the BI-634 road connects with the AP-1 highway, to Eibar (and from there to Donostia-San Sebastián and France) and to Vitoria-Gasteiz, the capital city of the province of Álava.

Three Bizkaibus lines stop in Atxondo; the A3923 line, which stops only at Apatamonasterio and connects it with the municipalities of Arrasate-Mondragón, Elorrio, Abadiño, Durango, Iurreta and Bilbao; the A3914 line which connects Elorrio with Durango stopping only at Apatamonasterio and the A3913 line that connects Durango with Arrazola with twelve stops in the municipality.

== See also ==
- Durangaldea
- Durango, Biscay
