= Virgilio Martínez Véliz =

Peruvian chef and restaurateur (born 1977)

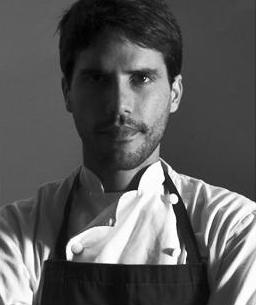
- Born: August 31, 1977 (age 49); Lima, Peru
- Education: Le Cordon Bleu
- Spouse: Pía León
- Culinary career
- Cooking style: Peruvian
- Rating
- 1 Michelin star
- Current restaurants
- Central Restaurante (Lima, Peru); Lima (London, United Kingdom); Mil (Cusco, Peru)

Virgilio Martínez Véliz (born August 31, 1977) is a Peruvian chef and restaurateur. He is considered one of the new generation of Peruvian chefs promoting the spread of Peruvian cuisine. He is known for his use of applying modern cooking techniques to indigenous Peruvian ingredients. Marie Claire magazine has called him "the new star of Lima's gastro sky." On April 29, 2013, his flagship restaurant, Central, entered as number 50 in The World's 50 Best Restaurants as awarded by the British magazine Restaurant. In 2014, Central jumped 35 places to number 15, winning the "Highest Climber" award, and later that year was named Best Restaurant in Latin America. In 2023, Central earned the No. 1 spot on the World's 50 Best Restaurants ranking.

According to a study on innovation in Peruvian gastronomy by the Inter-American Development Bank (2022), Virgilio Martínez had the conceptual idea of combining ingredients in the same dish in the same way that they are found together in the ecosystem.

== Career ==
Martínez studied at and received his certifications at Le Cordon Bleu in Ottawa and London. During his formative years he worked at well-known restaurants such as Lutèce (New York City); Can Fabes (Sant Celoni); and served as executive chef at Astrid & Gastón in both Bogotá and Madrid.

== Use of Peruvian ingredients ==
Martínez is known for his use of unique ingredients such as a potato grown at 5,000 meters above sea level; kushuru (cushuro), an edible cyanobacteria harvested in high-altitude wetlands; and wild varieties of kiwicha and quinoa. He is an aficionado of the use of salt, and cooks with more than 120 varieties in his restaurant in Lima. In 2013, Martínez helped form Mater Iniciativa, an interdisciplinary group of professionals who travel throughout Peru in search of unique ingredients which Martinez in turn incorporates into his cooking. In March 2018 he opened a laboratory in the middle of the Andes and works with local families to catalogue different crops.

== Current projects ==
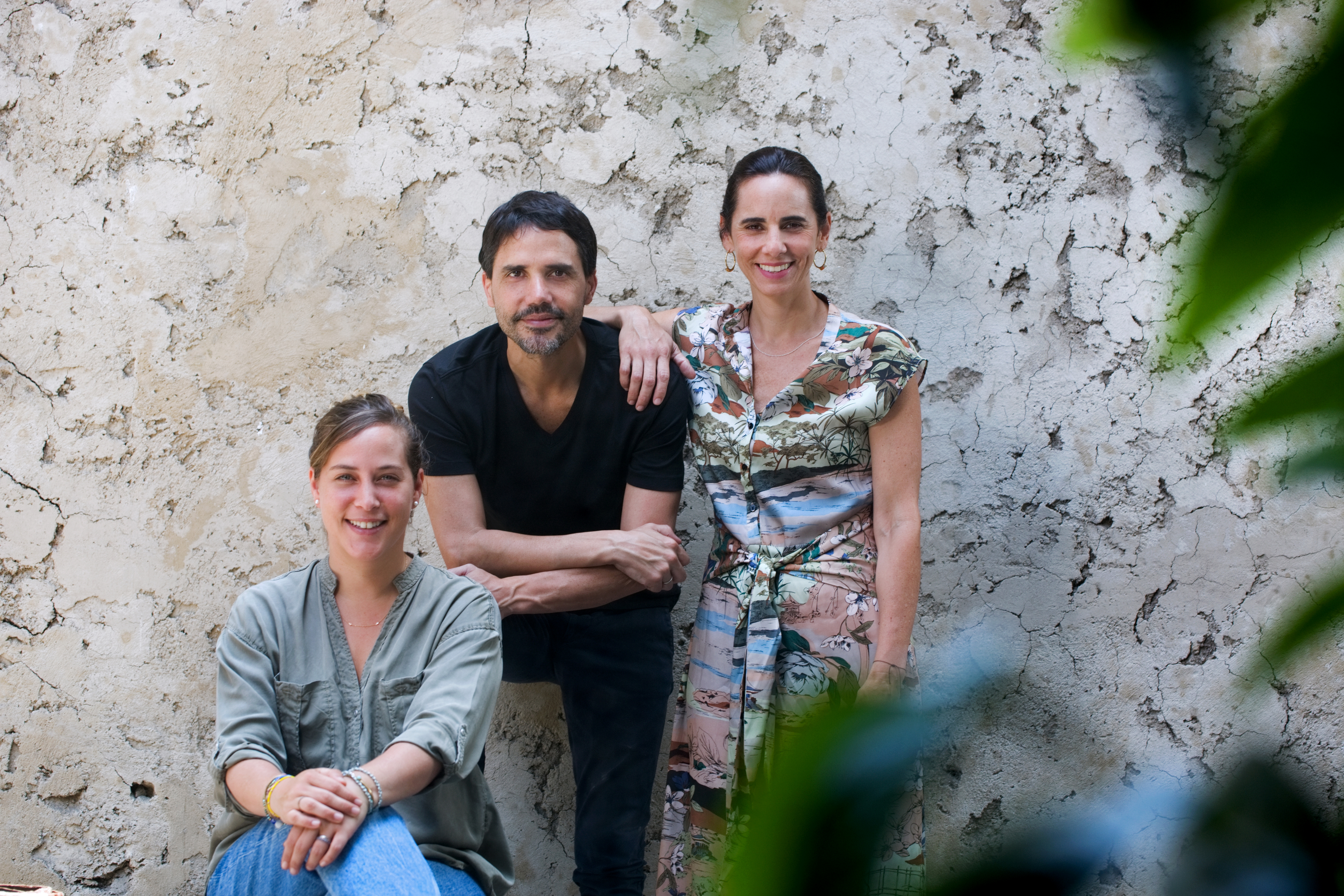
Virgilio Martinez, Malena Martinez & Pia Leon

Martínez is currently chef and owner of Central Restaurante, his flagship restaurant located in the Barranco District, Lima, Peru. In June 2012 he opened Senzo, a project in conjunction with Orient-Express Hotels, located in Palacio Nazarenas hotel in the city of Cuzco. In July 2012 he opened Lima, a modern Peruvian-style restaurant located in the Fitzrovia neighborhood of London. It was awarded a Michelin star in the 2014 Michelin Guide. In July 2014 a second Lima restaurant was opened in the Covent Garden district of London and dubbed Lima Floral. On March 5, 2017, a third Lima restaurant was opened in Dubai at Citywalk Phase 2. In March 2018, he opened Mil, near Moray which sits 11,706 feet above sea level in the Peruvian Andes. In December 2021, he established the menu for Estero, a restaurant with a mix of Mexican and Peruvian cuisine, located inside La Casa de la Playa, a boutique hotel from the Xcaret Group in Playa del Carmen, México.

== Piranha smuggling incident ==
On May 9, 2019, different news sources reported that Martinez had been stopped at Los Angeles' airport for trying to enter the US with 40 piranhas in vacuum-sealed plastic bags inside his personal luggage. After being questioned by airport officials about what he was bringing into the country, Martinez allegedly replied to be carrying "flesh and bones", which caused him to be detained and taken into an interrogation room at the airport. Martinez was released after showing airport officials photographs of the meal he was planning to cook with the carnivorous fish.

== International gastronomy events ==
Martínez has participated at various gastronomic congresses and events.

- Mesamérica (Mexico City)´
- Peixe em Lisboa (Lisbon, Portugal)
- Melbourne Food & Wine Festival (Melbourne, Australia)
- Identità Golose (Milan, Italy)
- Festival Cultura e Gastronomia Tiradentes (Minas Gerais, Brazil)
- Festa a Vico (Vico Equense, Italy)
- Ñam Santiago (Santiago, Chile)
- Savour (Singapore)
- Gulfood (Dubai, United Arab Emirates)
- Paris des Chefs (Paris, France)

== See also ==
- List of restaurateurs
