= Asador Etxebarri =

Spanish restaurant in Atxondo, Spain

Coordinates: 43°06′49″N 2°36′00″W

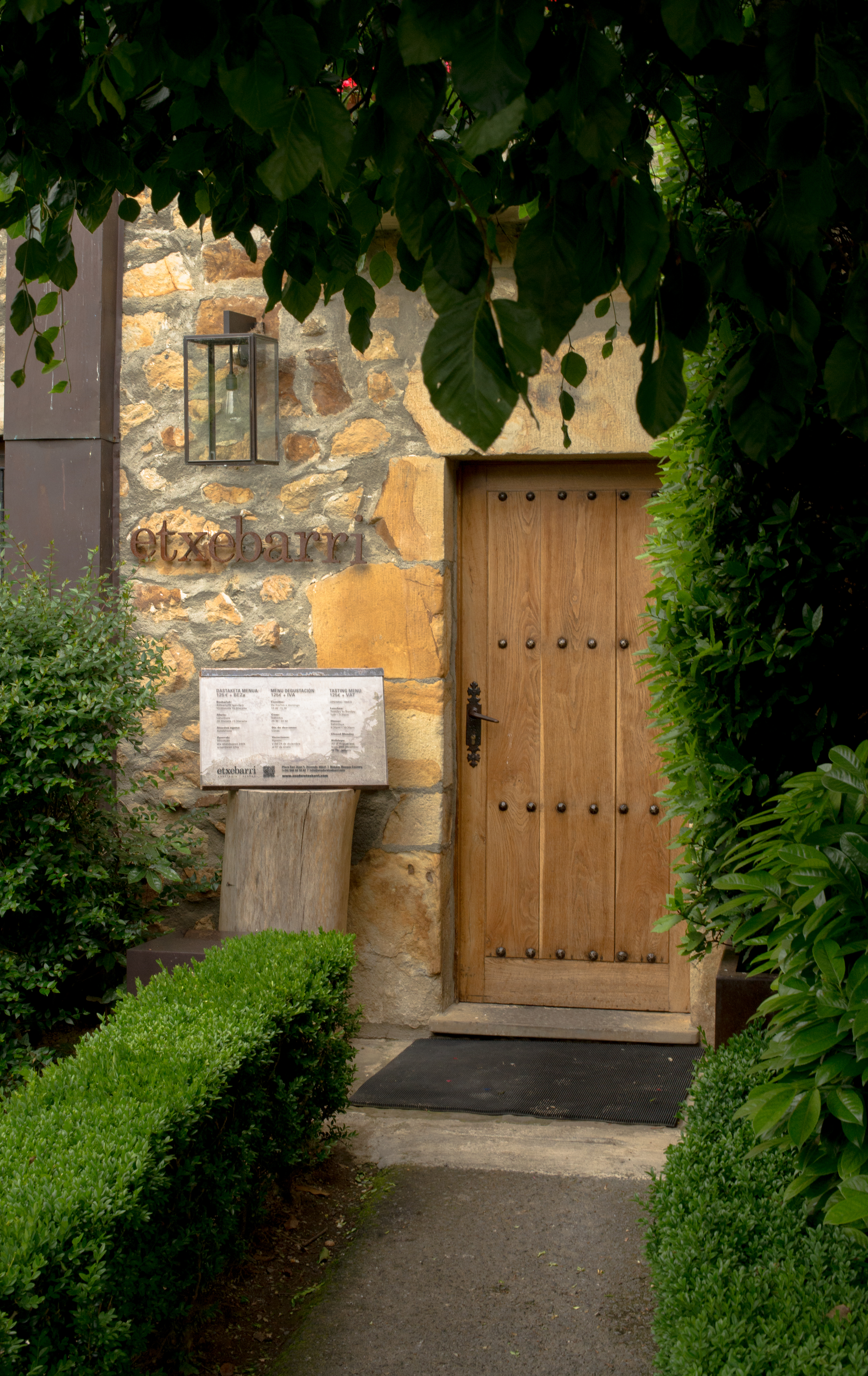
- Entrance
- Interactive map of Asador Etxebarri

Restaurant information
- Owner: Bittor Arguinzoniz
- Head chef: Bittor Arguinzoniz
- Food type: Basque
- Rating: 1 Michelin star
- Location: 1 San Juan Plaza, Atxondo, Basque Country, 48291, Spain
- Seating capacity: 35-40
- Reservations: Required

Asador Etxebarri is a Spanish restaurant in Atxondo, Basque Country, Spain. In 2026, it was recognized as #1 on the The World's 50 Best Restaurants, having been 2nd best the previous 2 years, 3rd best in 2021 and 2019, 4th in 2023, and 6th in 2015. It has also been voted 3rd best of the World's 101 Best Steak Restaurants.

The owner and chef is Bittor (or Victor) Arguinzoniz, who cooks everything over a grill, including the desserts, such as a smoked ice cream with beetroot. Arguinzoniz was born in the same village, next to the restaurant, and worked in a flag factory for many years before buying the restaurant with his father and uncle. He taught himself to cook and built his own kitchen full of manual grilling contraptions using multiple types of wood. The restaurant is notoriously hard to get into, with the restaurant reservations being through requests rather than a typical reservation system. The restaurant primarily offers a €300 14-course tasting menu, but also offers a la carte options as well. Wines are chosen by Mohamed Benabdallah who was previously at Mugaritz.

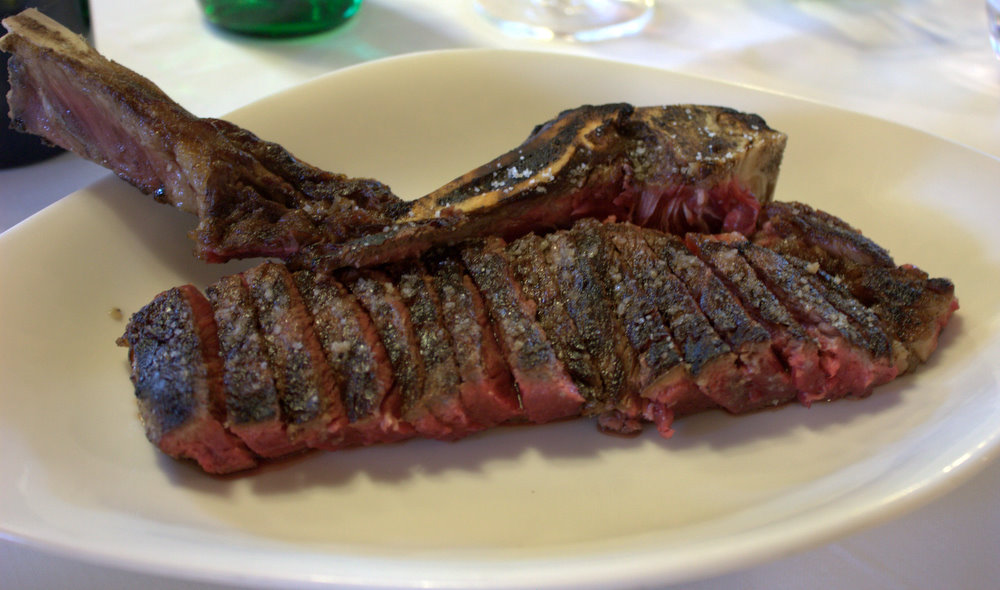
Txuleta/txuletón, or rib chop, a type of bone-in ribeye
