= Dan Hunter (chef) =

Australian chef

Dan Hunter is an Australian chef. He owns and operates Brae restaurant in Birregurra, Victoria, which was ranked 44 in The World's 50 Best Restaurants, 2017.

Hunter started his career as a dishwasher, and worked in Australia and Britain before getting a job at Mugaritz restaurant in Spain where he was chef de cuisine. He returned to Australia and worked for six years as head chef of the Royal Mail Restaurant in Dunkeld, Victoria, before starting Brae in 2013.

Hunter has been named Chef of the Year in both The Age Good Food Guide (2012 and 2016) and Australian Gourmet Traveller (2016). He is the author of Brae: Recipes and stories from the restaurant (Phaidon, 2017).
