= Mauro Colagreco =

Argentine chef

Mauro Colagreco (born 5 October 1976) is an Argentine chef at the three-Michelin stars restaurant Mirazur in Menton, France.

== Career ==
As a newly qualified chef, Colagreco headed to France and worked with Bernard Loiseau until his death in 2003. He then worked in Paris with Alain Passard at l’Arpège, Alain Ducasse at the Hotel Plaza Athénée and finally spending a year at Le Grand Véfour.

Colagreco established Mirazur in Menton in 2006. Just six months after opening Colagreco received the ‘Revelation of the Year’ award, a brand new category to recognize his merits, from Gault&Millau, and in less than a year, he earned his first Michelin star. His second Michelin star was awarded six years later.

Mirazur became officially one of the best restaurants in the world listed in The S.Pellegrino World's 50 Best Restaurants. In the same year, Colagreco was also awarded “Chef of the Year” by the prestigious Gault & Millau restaurant guide - the first non-French chef ever to receive this title.

His third Michelin star was awarded in January 2019.

In June 2019, Mirazur was elected the best restaurant in the world by The World's 50 Best Restaurants.

Colagreco has imposed a style of his own in the interpretation of ingredients and the contrast of flavours. This style is not rooted in his Italian-Argentine cultural heritage and does not refer to the experienced chefs with whom he worked in France.

In 2022, Colagreco was the very first chef to be named UNESCO Goodwill Ambassador for biodiversity.

== Restaurants ==
- Mirazur, in Menton, France
- Azur, in Beijing, China.
- Grill 58°, in Macao, China.
- Le Siècle, in Nanjing, China.
- Plaisance, in Hong Kong, China
- Grandcoeur, in Paris, France.
- BFire, in Courchevel, France.
- Le Majestic Bfire, in Cannes, France.
- Carne, in La Plata, Argentina.
- Carne, in Olivos, Argentina.
- Côte, in Bangkok, Thailand
- Cycle, in Tokyo, Japan
- Florie's, in Palm Beach, Florida, USA
- Kulm Country Club at Kulm Hotel St. Moritz, Switzerland
- Renzo at The Lake Como EDITION, Italy
- Cetino at The Lake Como EDITION, Italy

== Awards and honors ==
- 2009: Cuisinier de l’Année in Gault Millau
- 2017 : Nommé Chevalier de l’ordre national du Mérite
- 2017: Mirazur becomes a member of Les Grandes Tables du Monde
- 2018: Mirazur: The S. Pellegrino World's 50 Best Restaurants, #3
- 2019: Mirazur: The S. Pellegrino World's 50 Best Restaurants, #1
