= Royal Mail Restaurant =

Coordinates: 37.649°S 142.340°E

- Interactive map of Royal Mail Restaurant

Restaurant information
- Chef: Robin Wicken
- Location: Dunkeld, Victoria, Australia

The Royal Mail Restaurant is a Modern Australian restaurant in rural Dunkeld, Victoria connected to the Royal Mail Hotel. The chef de cuisine is Robin Wickens, who took over from Dan Hunter in 2013. Hunter had previously worked at Mugaritz and is now at Brae.

The restaurant prepares two tasting menus daily—one vegetarian and one omnivore—and the tasting takes three to four hours. Fruit and olives are harvested on the premises.

Since 2013, the restaurant has been the recipient of the Wine Spectator Grand Award.

== See also ==
- List of restaurants in Australia
