= Dan Hunter =

Dan Hunter may refer to:

- Dan Hunter (chef), Australian chef
- Dan Hunter (comics), DC comics character
- Dan Hunter (Hollyoaks), Hollyoaks character
- Dan Hunter (River City), River City character
- Dan Hunter (musician), founder of The Crownsmen

== See also ==
- Daniel Hunter (disambiguation)
