= Massimo Bottura =

Italian chef and restaurateur

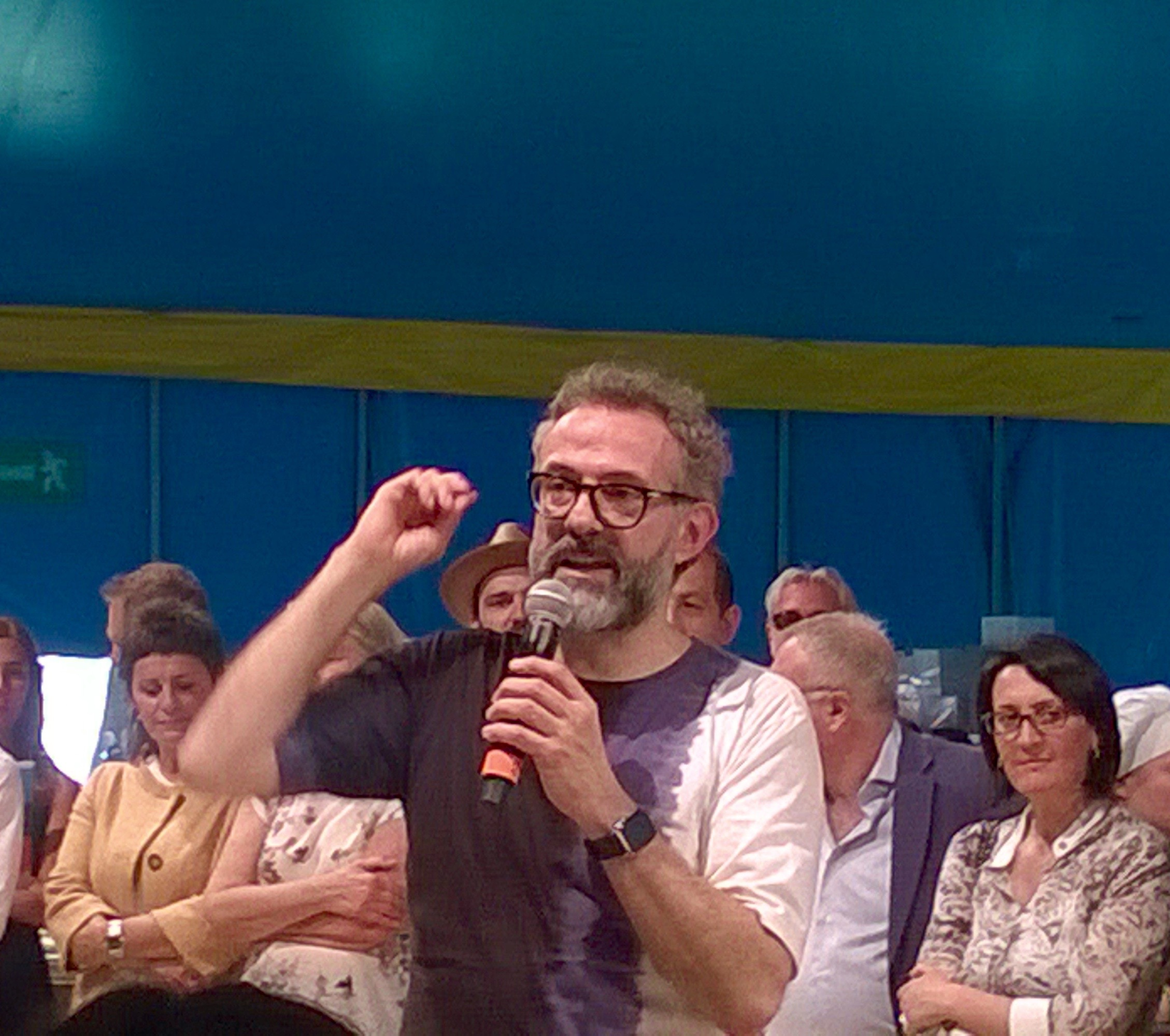
- Bottura in 2015
- Born: 30 September 1962 (age 64); Modena, Italy
- Culinary career
- Cooking style: Italian
- Current restaurant
- Osteria Francescana, Modena; Gucci Osteria, Florence; Gucci Osteria, Beverly Hills; Gucci Osteria, Tokyo; Gucci Osteria, Seoul; Torno Subito, Singapore; Torno Subito, Miami; Franceschetta58, Modena; Cavallino, Maranello; Al Gatto Verde, Casa Maria Luigia, Modena; Osteria Francescana, Casa Maria Luigia, Modena

Massimo Bottura (born 30 September 1962) is an Italian chef, gastronome and entrepreneur.

Massimo Bottura is Chef and owner of Osteria Francescana (located in the historic center of his native Modena), which has earned three Michelin stars and a green Michelin star. The restaurant has been ranked among the top restaurants in the world, including first place in The World's 50 Best Restaurants in 2016 and 2018.

In 2014, the chef won the White Guide Global Gastronomy Award, which honors individuals who have made outstanding contributions to gastronomy.

== Early life, family and education ==
Born and raised in Modena, Massimo Bottura developed an interest in cooking from a young age, watching his mother, grandmother and aunt as they prepared meals.

After graduating from secondary school, he enrolled in law school at the University of Modena and Reggio Emilia, but in 1986 he interrupted his studies and chose instead to join the family business.

== Career ==
=== Training and early career ===
Bottura initially worked as a wholesaler of petroleum products. Also in 1986, however, he took over Trattoria del Campazzo, near Nonantola, where he studied Emilian cuisine with the support of rezdora (matriarch) Lidia Cristoni. He later studied French cuisine by taking lessons from Georges Coigny, which provided him with a culinary foundation that combined regional Italian cuisine with classical French training.

In 1993 he moved to New York and worked in an Italian café. There he met Lara Gilmore, his future wife. After nine months, he returned to Modena and in 1994 began an internship of several months with Alain Ducasse at his restaurant Le Louis XV in Monte Carlo. He returned to Modena and took over a traditional trattoria in the heart of the city, Osteria Francescana, which officially opened on 19 March 1995. In 2000, Catalan chef Ferran Adrià invited Bottura to the kitchen of his restaurant El Bulli in Spain, where the Modenese chef learned the basics of molecular cuisine.

=== Osteria Francescana ===
On 19 March 1995, Bottura opened Osteria Francescana in the historic center of Modena. Osteria Francescana holds three Michelin stars, a distinction that has been maintained since 2012. It has been ranked first on The World's 50 Best Restaurants list twice, in 2016 and 2018. Since 2019, the restaurant has been part of the Best of the Best list, a category that includes all the restaurants that have ranked first on The World's 50 Best Restaurants list and are no longer eligible for voting in future editions. The restaurant has also received top marks from L'Espresso, Gambero Rosso and the Touring Club guide.

In 2020, Osteria Francescana was awarded the new Michelin Green Star for its constant commitment against food waste and in favor of a more equitable and sustainable food system.

=== Ascension ===
In 2002, Bottura received his first Michelin star, followed by the second in 2006 and the third in 2012.

In 2011, again in Modena, he took over the restaurant Franceschetta58. It provides a more casual dining experience than his first restaurant, serving local ingredients in a convivial atmosphere.

In 2013, he participated in the Year of Italian Culture in the United States and was featured in an episode of the fifth season of the TV series Il Testimone, hosted by Pif.

He is one of the ten directors of the training center Basque Culinary Center.

In 2015, he was the featured chef in the first episode of the Netflix documentary Chef's Table.

In October 2016, he was named one of The Greats by The New York Times.

In 2018, Gucci Osteria da Massimo Bottura opened in Florence with the aim of honoring the union between local traditions and multicultural encounters. The restaurant was awarded its first Michelin Star in 2019. In February 2019, Bottura worked in collaboration with W Hotels to open Torno Subito at W Dubai - The Palm on Palm Jumeirah. At the beginning of 2020, Gucci Osteria da Massimo Bottura also opened location in Beverly Hills, California. More locations followed: Tokyo (August 2021) and Seoul (February 2022). In 2024, he opened Torno Subito in Singapore, in collaboration with COMO Group, and a few months later also Torno Subito Miami.

In 2019 he was named among Time magazine's 100 Most Influential People. In May of the same year he opened a new concept of hospitality together with his wife, Casa Maria Luigia, a guest house in an 18th-century property in the Emilian countryside. In 2024, the guest house obtained three Michelin keys.

In June 2020, together with other chefs, architects, Nobel Prize winners in economics and leaders of international organizations, he signed the appeal for a purple economy ("For a cultural renaissance of the economy") published in Corriere della Sera, El País and Le Monde.

In June 2021, Bottura reopened the restaurant Cavallino in collaboration with Ferrari and the architect and designer India Mahdavi.

Forbes Italia presented Massimo Bottura with the Maestro Award and inducted him into the Most Powerful Chef 2026 Hall of Fame. The award recognises his vision of cuisine as a form of cultural expression and his contribution to broadening the role of chefs in contemporary society.

Massimo Bottura and Lara Gilmore received the inaugural Avolta Legend Award for the impact of Food for Soul. Through its Refettori, the project turns surplus food into meals served in welcoming spaces where people can come together around the table, fostering social inclusion.

Casa Maria Luigia, Massimo Bottura and Lara Gilmore’s hospitality project, debuted at No. 18 in The World’s 50 Best Hotels 2026. It also received the Lavazza Highest New Entry Award 2026, which goes to the highest-ranked property making its debut on the list.

Osteria Francescana received the regional restaurant award for Emilia-Romagna in the Falstaff Restaurant Guide Italia 2027, released in 2026. The award reaffirms the Via Stella restaurant’s standing as a benchmark for contemporary cuisine in the region.

Osteria Francescana earned Tre Forchette with a score of 98 out of 100 in Gambero Rosso’s Ristoranti d’Italia 2027 guide.

The Culinary Institute of Barcelona presented Osteria Francescana and its team with the Best Practices Recognition Award at a ceremony held on 4 November during Fòrum Gastronòmic Barcelona.

Al Gatto Verde, led by chef Jessica Rosval, debuted at No. 24 in The World’s 50 Best Restaurants 2026, unveiled in Lima. At the same ceremony, Rosval received the World’s Best Female Chef Award 2026.

=== Beyond restaurants ===
Beyond his work in the restaurant industry, Massimo Bottura has been producing IGP balsamic vinegar and extra virgin olive oil since 1995 with his line of condiments, Villa Manodori, which was the result of his search for the highest-quality ingredients.

In September of the same year, Massimo Bottura was appointed Goodwill Ambassador for the United Nations Environment Programme (UNEP) during the inauguration of the International Day of Awareness of Food Loss and Waste. Since 21 September 2024, he has been an ambassador for the UN's Sustainable Development Goals (SDGs). In September 2025, he created the menu of the G7 Agriculture at the Neapolis Archaeological Park.

==== Food for Soul ====
In 2015, coinciding with the Milan Expo 2015, Bottura collaborated with Caritas Ambrosiana to create a project called the Refettorio Ambrosiano.

In Brazil, the project was inaugurated during the 2016 Summer Olympic Games in collaboration with chef David Hertz, resulting in the Refettorio Gastromotiva.

In 2015, Bottura and his wife founded Food for Soul, a non-profit organization that, through the daily work of the Refettorios around the world, focuses on combating food waste and social isolation through the quality of ideas and the value of hospitality.

To raise awareness about these issues, Massimo Bottura published the book Bread is Gold in 2017, published by Phaidon Press – Il Pane è Oro, published in Italian by Ippocampo and Phaidon. The book gathers recipes, ideas, and experiences from the chefs who first cooked at the Refettorio Ambrosiano, inviting readers to look at the ingredients in their pantries and refrigerators with new eyes. Since then, Food for Soul has developed several projects worldwide in collaboration with local partners. By creating community spaces where people are invited to connect around a meal, Food for Soul aims to demonstrate the value and potential of people, places, and food while encouraging the served community to support social change.

In 2020, during the COVID-19 pandemic, the Refettorios of Food for Soul continued to work and support those in need. Furthermore, a fundraising campaign was launched, which enabled the recovery of over 35 tons of food surplus in a single month and the delivery of more than 100,000 meals to vulnerable people and frontline healthcare workers.

Refettorios Mérida and Lima opened their doors in 2020, along with Refettorio Harlem in New York and Refettorio San Francisco in California. In 2021, the Refettorio OzHarvest in Sydney and Refettorio Geneva in Switzerland were launched. In 2024, the Refettorio Modena will reopen, while other projects are in development.

==== Kitchen Quarantine ====
In March 2020, after the temporary closure of Osteria Francescana due to the first COVID-19 lockdown, Massimo and his daughter Alexa started Kitchen Quarantine, a series of Instagram live broadcasts conducted by the Bottura family every night during quarantine. The project was created to interact with families around the world, cook together and exchange ideas on how to reduce household food waste; an innovative way to bring an extra smile during a particularly difficult time for communities around the world. The 24th annual Webby Awards honoured Massimo Bottura with a 2020 Webby Special Achievement Award as Chef of the Year for his Kitchen Quarantine series, showcasing his family meals to fans around the world.

== Books ==
- Aceto balsamico, Bibliotheca Culinaria, 2005.
- Pro. Attraverso tradizione e innovazione (with Cicco Sultano), Bibliotheca Culinaria, 2006.
- Parmigiano Reggiano, Bibliotheca Culinaria, 2006.
- Vieni in Italia con me, Phaidon-L'ippocampo, ottobre 2014. The book documents twenty years of cooking and the evolution of Osteria Francescana with images, storytelling and recipes that best represent the chef.
- Il Pane è Oro - ingredienti ordinari per piatti straordinari, Phaidon-L'ippocampo, novembre 2017. The book collects recipes, ideas and experiences of the chefs who first cooked at the Refettorio Ambrosiano, to invite readers to see the ingredients in their home pantries and refrigerators with different eyes.
- Slow Food Fast Cars, Phaidon-L'ippocampo, 2023. The first and only book about Casa Maria Luigia, Massimo Bottura and Lara Gilmore’s idyllic guest house just outside Modena.

Books translated in other languages

- (EN) Never trust a skinny Italian chef, Phaidon, 2014
- (FR) Ne jamais faire confiance à un chef italien trop mince, Phaidon, 2015
- (EN) Bread is Gold, Phaidon 2017

== Honors, prizes and awards ==
2002

- Michelin Guide: one Michelin Star.
- Gambero Rosso guide, Best Emerging Chef Award.

2004

- L'ESPRESSO guide, Performance of the Year.

2005

- The Best of Gastronomy, International Award.
- L'ESPRESSO guide, Lunch of the Year.
- Veronelli guide, Three Stars.

2006

- Michelin Guide: two Michelin Stars.
- Golosaria, Creative Restaurant of the Year.

2007

- Identità Golose, Best Creative Chef
- Gambero Rosso guide, Three Forks.
- L'ESPRESSO guide, Dish of the Year: "Riso grigio... e nero".
- L'ESPRESSO guide, score 19/20.

2008

- L'ESPRESSO guide, Dish of the Year: "Zuppa di lumache e spuma di aglio dolce".

2009

- L'ESPRESSO guide, score 19,5/20.
- Gambero Rosso guide, Dish of the Year: "Homage to Thelonious Monk".
- The World's 50 Best Restaurants, 13th Best Restaurant in the World.
- The World's 50 Best Restaurants, Highest New Entry.
- Istituto Valorizzazione Salumi Italiani, "Personaggio di Gusto".

2010

- L'ESPRESSO guide, score 19,75/20.
- The World's 50 Best Restaurants, 6th Best Restaurant in the World.
- The World's 50 Best Restaurants, Best Italian Restaurant.

2011

- L'ESPRESSO guide, score 19,75 (Best Restaurant in Italy).
- Grand Prix de l'Art de la Cuisine, Chef of the Year.
- The World's 50 Best Restaurants, 4th Best Restaurant in the World.
- The World's 50 Best Restaurants, Chef's Choice Award.
- Lo Mejor de la Gastronomia, El Restaurante del Dia 9.25.

2012

- Gambero Rosso guide, Three Forks with a score of 95/100 (Best Restaurant in Italy).
- L'ESPRESSO guide, score 19.75/20 (Best Restaurant in Italy).
- Osteria Francescana receives Three Michelin Stars (2012)
- Touring guide, score 93 (Best Restaurant in Italy).
- The World's 50 Best Restaurants, 5th Best Restaurant in the World.

2013

- Gambero Rosso guide, Three Forks with a score of 95/100 (Best Restaurant in Italy).
- L'ESPRESSO guide, score 19.75/20 (Best Restaurant in Italy).
- The World's 50 Best Restaurants, 3rd Best Restaurant in the World.

2014

- The World's 50 Best Restaurants, 3rd Best Restaurant in the World.

2015

- The World's 50 Best Restaurants, 2nd Best Restaurant in the World.
- L'ESPRESSO guide, score 20/20 (Best Restaurant in Italy).
- Gambero Rosso guide, Three Forks with a score of 95/100 (Best Restaurant in Italy).

2016

- The World's 50 Best Restaurants, 1st Best Restaurant in the World.

2017

- The World's 50 Best Restaurants, 2nd Best Restaurant in the World.
- National Award Toson d'oro di Vespasiano Gonzaga.
- Honorary degree in business management by University of Bologna (2017)

2018

- The World's 50 Best Restaurants, 1st Best Restaurant in the World.
- Gold Medal of Civic Merit from the Municipality of Milan.
- Honorary degree at the Academy of Fine Arts (2018)

2019

- Gucci Osteria Firenze: one Michelin Star

2020

- Osteria Francescana Three Michelin Stars and a Michelin Green Star (2020)
- Massimo Bottura receives the Premiolino-BMW SpecialMente award.
- Food for Soul receives the Compasso d'Oro award.
- Massimo Bottura is named Goodwill Ambassador for the United Nations Environment Programme (UNEP), on the occasion of the inauguration of the International Day of Awareness of Food Loss and Waste.
- Webby Special Achievement Award as Chef of the Year; Kitchen Quarantine program receives a Webby Award.

2021

- L'ESPRESSO guide, Lunch of the Year, score 19/20.
- Gambero Rosso guide, Three Forks.
- Gucci Osteria Los Angeles: one Michelin Star

2022

- L'ESPRESSO guide, score 19/20, Service of the Year Award
- Gambero Rosso guide, Three Forks.
- Gucci Osteria Tokyo: one Michelin Star (2022)
- America Award from the Italy–USA Foundation at the Chamber of Deputies.

2023

- Massimo Bottura and his wife Lara Gilmore receive the Cultural Diplomacy Award from the Consulate General of the United States of America.
- Massimo receives the No Waste Award from Identità Golose.
- 2023 Culture Award, established by Confartigianato Emilia Romagna.
- 2023 McKim Medal awarded by the American Academy in Rome.
- Massimo Bottura receives the Farnèse d'Or pour la Culture, a high recognition for cultural commitment promoted by the Chamber of Commerce France Italie CCI.
- L'ESPRESSO guide, Lunch of the Year, score 19/20, platinum hat.

2024

- Casa Maria Luiga: three Michelin Keys
- Chef Massimo Bottura signs and creates the menu of the G7 at Borgo Egnazia in the presence of the Heads of State and Government.
- L'ESPRESSO guide, From Gragnano to Bangkok, Dish of the Year, score 19.5/20.
- Al Gatto Verde: one Michelin Star and a Michelin Green Star (2024)

2025

- Massimo Bottura is honored with the award “Master of Italian Art and Cuisine” by the Italian Prime Minister.
- Massimo Bottura receives the “Excellence in Hospitality” award at the Vinitaly trade fair.
- Massimo Bottura welcomed and served as a guide to King Charles III and Queen Camilla during their visit to Ravenna for the Emilia Romagna Festival, an event which also saw the participation of the President of the Italian Republic, Sergio Mattarella.
- Massimo Bottura and Lara Gilmore receive the 2025 Woodford Reserve Icon Award during The World’s 50 Best Restaurants awards in Turin.
- Massimo Bottura receives the Golden Lion for Merit at the “Gran Premio Internazionale di Venezia”.
- Massimo Bottura is included in the list of the 25 “Most Powerful Chefs”, with a special tribute honoring him with the “Il Maestro” Special Award, a recognition that highlights his extraordinary impact on the world of gastronomy.
- Massimo Bottura is honored with the Visionary Award during The Best Chef Awards ceremony, in addition to receiving the Three Knives recognition.
- At Casa Maria Luigia, the three Michelin keys have been reaffirmed by the Michelin Guide Hotels.
- The MICHELIN Guide Italy 2026 awards one Star to Cavallino restaurant, born from the collaboration between Ferrari and Massimo Bottura.
- Massimo Bottura received the Mentorship Award during COOK NIGHT by Corriere della Sera, the annual event that celebrates Italian dining and its leading figures.
- Massimo Bottura was honored at the 2025 UNCA Awards by the United Nations Correspondents Association in New York. The chef received the Global Advocate of the Year award, which is presented to individuals who stand out for their commitment to humanitarian and social causes.

2026

- Forbes Italia presented Massimo Bottura with the Maestro Award and inducted him into the Most Powerful Chef 2026 Hall of Fame.
- Massimo Bottura and Lara Gilmore received the Avolta Legend Award for the impact of Food for Soul, which promotes social inclusion by turning surplus food into meals served in the welcoming spaces of its Refettori.
- Casa Maria Luigia debuted at No. 18 in The World’s 50 Best Hotels 2026 and received the Lavazza Highest New Entry Award 2026.
- Osteria Francescana received the regional award for Emilia-Romagna in the Falstaff Restaurant Guide Italia 2027.
- Osteria Francescana earned Tre Forchette with a score of 98/100 in Gambero Rosso’s Ristoranti d’Italia 2027 guide.
- Osteria Francescana received the Best Practices Recognition Award from the Culinary Institute of Barcelona.
- Al Gatto Verde debuted at No. 24 in The World’s 50 Best Restaurants 2026. As part of the same edition, Jessica Rosval received the World’s Best Female Chef Award 2026.
