= Maido (restaurant) =

Peruvian-Japanese restaurant in Lima, Peru

Coordinates: 12°07′31″S 77°01′50″W

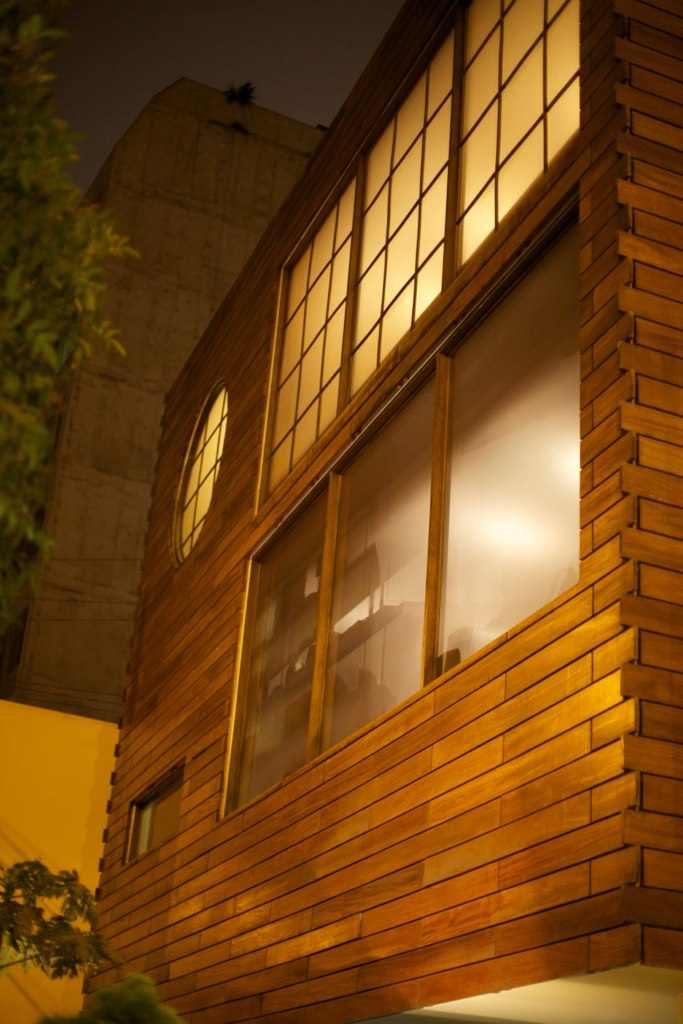
- The restaurant's exterior in 2012
- Interactive map of Maido

Restaurant information
- Established: October 2009
- Owner: Mitsuharu "Micha" Tsumura
- Food type: Nikkei (Fusion • Peruvian • Japanese)
- Location: San Martín 399, Miraflores, Lima, 15074, Peru
- Seating capacity: 52
- Website: maido.pe

Maido is a fusion restaurant opened in October 2009 in Miraflores, Lima, Peru. It is owned and headed by chef Mitsuharu "Micha" Tsumura. Maido's dishes are rooted in Nikkei cuisine, which blends Peruvian and Japanese cuisines. Maido was ranked first in the World's 50 Best Restaurants in 2025.

== Description ==
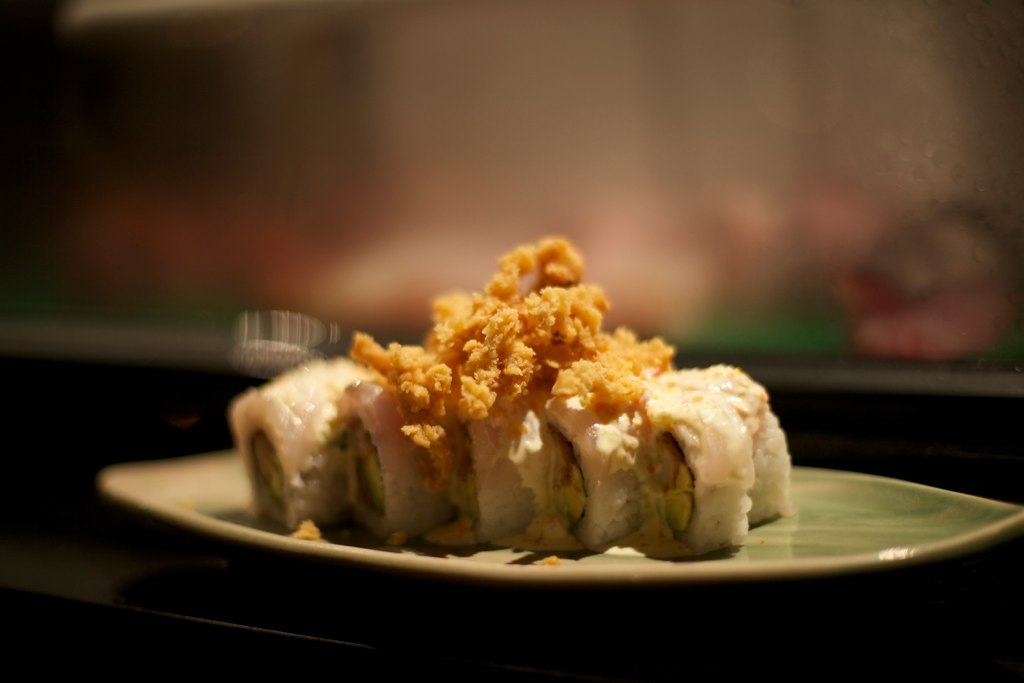
Sushi served at the restaurant

Maido offers a tasting menu of more than ten courses. The restaurant serves Nikkei cuisine, a fusion of Peruvian and Japanese cooking customs. For example, the sushi a lo pobre (Spanish for "poor-style sushi") consists of a nigirizushi prepared with beef instead of salmon, over rice, and topped with a quail egg and onion, seasoned with chili and soy. The Guinea pig is fried in duck fat, then garnished with cassava cream. There are also à la carte options, featuring seasonal ingredients.

The restaurant has two floors. As of 2024, it seats 52 guests (before the COVID-19 pandemic in Peru, it held up to 78).

== History ==
Mitsuharu "Micha" Tsumura studied at the College of Food Innovation and Technology at Johnson & Wales University, in Rhode Island, United States. He traveled to Japan to study Japanese cuisine on the advice of his Japanese father. Tsumura opened Maido in Miraflores District of Lima, Peru, in October 2009. The restaurant specialized in Nikkei cuisine, becoming the first one in the country, according to him.

The name of the restaurant is based on the word maido (Japanese: まいど) is a greeting used to greet regular customers for always returning. The restaurant's early years were slow, with around 30 dishes sold per day. The concept of Nikkei cuisine already existed when the restaurant opened, but Tsumura considered that it was not widely understood at the time. He contemplated relocating or closing the restaurant, but he received an invitation to the Mistura Food Fair to embark on a journey across the country, where he learned about a variety of local ingredients. As of January 2024, it employed 85 people.

== Reception ==
Kendall Hill highlighted for the Australian Financial Review the short rib stew braised for 50 hours in a nitsuke sauce, prepared with soy, mirin and sake, the ceviche's presentation inside a limpet shell, and a potato chip with bonito tartare, quail yolk, and two-year-old katsuobushi. Sorrel Moseley-Williams described the tasting menu as a mixture of different culinary elements.

William Reed Ltd ranked Maido on its World's 50 Best Restaurants rankings multiple times, topping the 2025 list. It previously ranked at number 5 (2024), 6 (2023), 7 (2018 and 2021), 8 (2017), 10 (2019), 11 (2022), 13 (2016), and 44 (2015). There was no list in 2020 due to the impact of the COVID-19 pandemic on the food industry.

== See also ==
- List of Peruvian restaurants
