= Alchemist (restaurant) =

Restaurant in Copenhagen, Denmark

- Interactive map of Alchemist

Restaurant information
- Established: 2015 (11 years ago)
- Owners: Rasmus Munk, Lars Seier Christensen
- Head chef: Rasmus Munk
- Food type: Experimental / Holistic cuisine
- Dress code: None
- Rating: Michelin Guide
- Location: Refshalevej 173C, Copenhagen, 1432, Denmark
- Coordinates: 55°41′33″N 12°37′04″E
- Reservations: Required
- Website: alchemist.dk

Alchemist is a two Michelin-star restaurant founded and run by chef Rasmus Munk, in Copenhagen, Denmark. The restaurant is placed in the top 10 of The World's 50 Best Restaurants, ranking 8th in 2024 and 5th in 2025, and 3rd in 2026. In 2024, it was described by The New Yorker as "one of the most sought-after reservations in the fine-dining world". According to Munk, the restaurant has "a holistic approach extending beyond the plate to create thought-provoking, aesthetical, emotional and gastrophysical meal experiences."

== History ==
In 2015, with financing from a bank loan, Rasmus Munk opened the first 15-seat iteration of Alchemist in a former bistro in Copenhagen, presenting a multisensory dining concept that integrated art, science, and social themes, departing from prevailing New Nordic traditions. The first iteration featured an experimental 45-course menu. One notable dish from this period was a lamb heart tartare presented with a sauce in a blood transfusion bag and a card promoting organ donation. The dish reportedly led to 1,500 new donor registrations and marked a turning point in Munk's approach, laying the groundwork for the philosophy behind the current Alchemist. The restaurant operated until 2017.

Among the early diners was businessman Lars Seier Christensen, who later partnered with Munk to build a larger version of Alchemist. The new 2,200-square-meter restaurant opened in 2019 in Refshaleøen, a former industrial area in Copenhagen. Initially budgeted at 20 million Danish kroner, the final cost exceeded four times that amount. Munk, who once held a 35% stake, now holds under 10% ownership.

Within a record time of seven months after its opening, Alchemist was rewarded two Michelin stars. Within a few years, it was ranked among the world's top 10 restaurants by The World's 50 Best Restaurants, and voted the Best Restaurant in Europe by Opinionated About Dining.

Despite critical acclaim, Alchemist operates near break-even and has yet to generate a profit on its overall investment as of September 2024. Munk has described Alchemist as part of a broader mission to elevate food to the level of art and contribute to scientific and societal advancement, including the development of future food technologies, and has publicly stated an ambition to win a Nobel Peace Prize. In 2024, Munk indicated that Alchemist may close earlier than expected. He has cited a desire to focus on his food innovation center Spora, founded in 2023, which develops new food technologies and ingredients, with some of the projects focusing on food waste and alternative protein sources.

== Location and design ==
Alchemist is located in the former scenery workshop of the Royal Danish Theatre in Copenhagen. The restaurant's main dining room is designed as a planetarium dome, inspired by Munk's childhood visits to the Copenhagen Planetarium. The space is enclosed, with no natural light. Although architects advised incorporating natural light and Nordic materials such as concrete and blond wood, Munk opted to create a self-contained environment intended to exist independently of any specific location. After parting ways with several architects, Munk's own concept sketches were translated into CAD files by Studio Duncalf in London. The exterior is deliberately unmarked and difficult to locate.

Particularly within the context of Nordic cuisine, known for its bright, delicate, and minimalistic characteristics, Alchemist presents a stark contrast through its dark and immersive aesthetic. As Munk explains:

"The darker and [more] mystical the universe is around you, the more you discover yourself, the dishes, and the experience ... I think for me it encapsulates you in a setting where you lose a little bit time and space."

Dinner is presented across five themed locations, including a dome, a lounge bar, a balcony, and two regularly refurbished art installation rooms. The experience lasts between four and six hours, with "curiosity and presence of mind" cited as the only prerequisites by the restaurant.

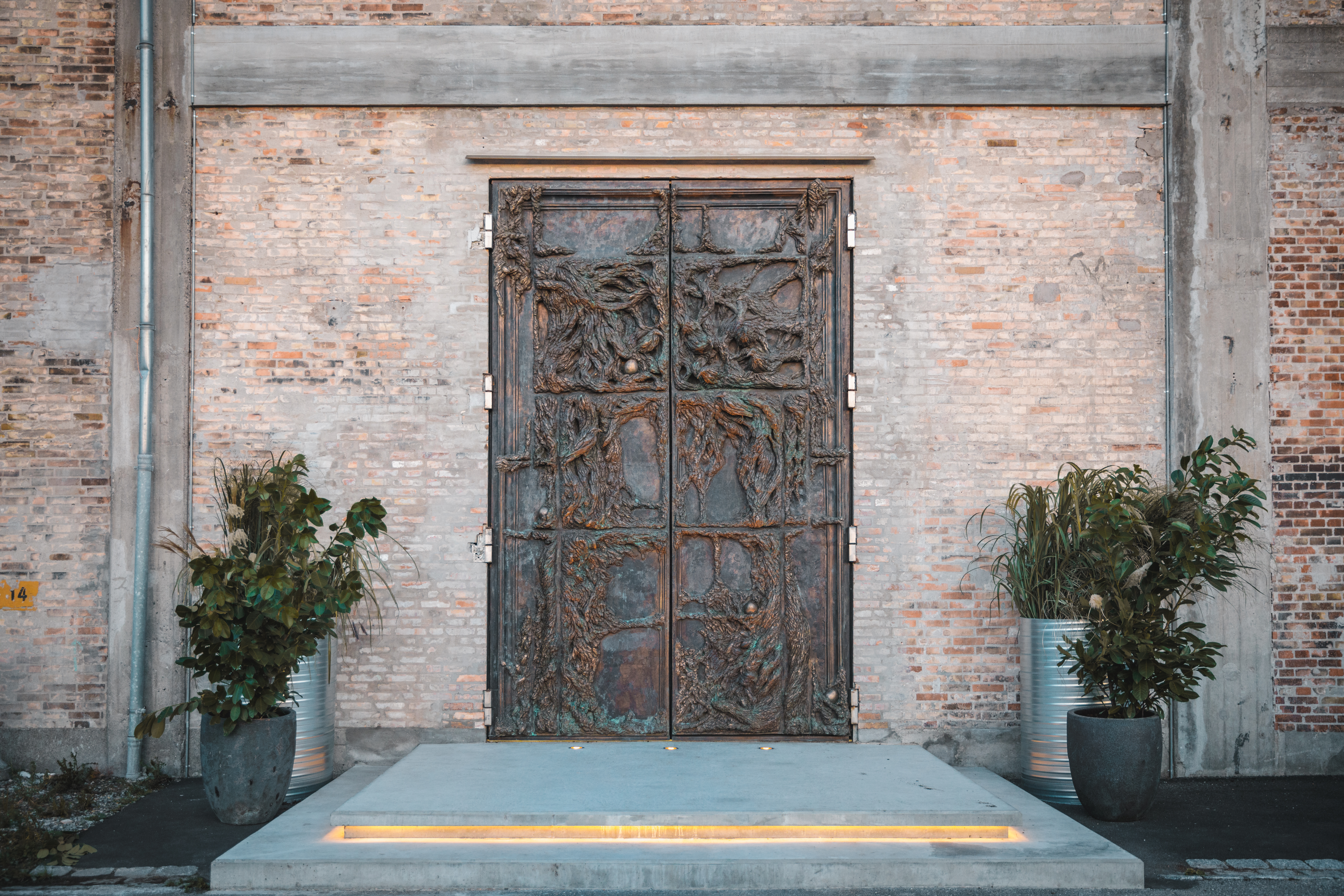
Alchemist

== Concept and dining experience ==
The Alchemist experience consists of up to 50 "impressions", combining both edible dishes and purely experiential experiences. Many impressions address themes such as sustainability, food waste, animal welfare, and healthcare, and is accompanied by explanations of its ingredients, techniques, and intended message. Munk describes Alchemist as a "holistic dining" experience. Holistic Cuisine, developed by Munk at Alchemist, is a culinary approach that incorporates scientific, ethical, and aesthetic elements to create meals intended to engage multiple senses and provoke reflection. It draws on fields such as gastrophysics, the arts, philosophy, and social sciences to address the meal as a complex, interdisciplinary experience. The concept was created to define the restaurant's broader focus beyond traditional gastronomy, which Munk felt existing culinary frameworks did not adequately capture.

Examples include "Burnout Chicken," featuring a chicken foot caged to the dimensions of industrial farming practices; and "Food for Thought," steamed lamb's brain served inside a silicone human head to highlight food waste. "1984" features cod eye gel, lobster, and caviar served from a replica of Munk's eye, referencing the paradox between voluntary exposure on social media and involuntary surveillance on the same platforms; while "Tongue Kiss" offers beef tartare on a silicone tongue to provoke reflection on pleasure and disgust. Other dishes highlight biodiversity, such as a dish using invasive species, and a nettle butterfly-based course developed for its protein potential. Since 2020, nearly 13,000 guests have scanned a QR code linked to blood donation following dishes like "Lifeline," a blood drop-shaped ice cream made with pig's blood.

Daisy, a welcome drink based on a pisco sour and the Danish national flower, the marguerite daisy

Early, more extreme dishes served at the first iteration of Alchemist, including an edible ashtray ("The Ashtray") and live woodlice, have been retired in favor of new creations, with the team aiming to introduce two new impressions monthly. "The Ashtray" visually mimicked a metal ashtray filled with cigarette ashes but was, in fact, a traditional Danish dish known as "Burning Love" (mashed potatoes, bacon, and butter). Created by Munk, it served as both a tribute to his late grandmother, who died of lung cancer, and a subtle commentary on smoking. Munk has described the first iteration of the restaurant as "a little more punk," but maintains that dishes were never created solely for shock value. He rejected a dish proposed by a staff chef featuring a tartlet filled with fish eyes, questioning its lack of a social message.

Alchemist's dishes rarely utilize conventional crockery or cutlery. Instead, the presentation incorporates custom-made artistic objects.

== Staff ==
Alchemist operates four nights a week, from Tuesday to Friday, and only opens when chef Rasmus Munk is present. Staff work a four-day, 48-hour week, a schedule described as "unheard of in the fine dining business" by BBC.

As of 2024, the restaurant employed approximately 100 staff. It employs specialists from various fields, including visual effects artists, sound engineers, animators, industrial designers, and writers. As of 2023, the hospitality team of around 25 people represented at least a dozen nationalities. English is the primary working language, with limited use of Danish. The hospitality team at Alchemist is supported by an in-house scriptwriter and follows a 100-page manual that details each dish and drink, the research and statistics behind thematic elements, and information related to the overall production.

Service is based on a model of "invisible hospitality," aiming to minimize visible hierarchy. Staff wear standardized uniforms, with kitchen staff distinguished by aprons.

As of 2025, the restaurant's general manager is Lykke Metzger, Munk's partner, who has worked there since 2016.

== Reception ==
In February 2023, Spanish chef Ferran Adrià described Alchemist as the "hottest" restaurant in the world. He also said that only Munk's holistic cuisine concept was at today's vanguard. He described his visit to Alchemist as one of the most memorable meals he had experienced in the previous decade and called the restaurant "the restaurant that most resembles a gastronomic opera".

The Michelin Guide states "there's no restaurant in the world quite like Alchemist" and describes dining at the restaurant as "an immersive and perfectly choreographed six-hour-plus experience" and "a highly theatrical affair".

In a 2023 profile, Vanity Fair wrote:

"Alchemist flies smack in the face of the naturalistic, terroir-based cooking most closely associated with this part of the world (and now being practiced with renewed, mold-addled vigor at the new Noma just down the road). It is the kind of place to build both menu and decor around an annually changing theme—diversity for its debut—and that, without a shred of irony, can describe itself as inspired by both Aristotle and Brecht, and as 'a parallel journey through...unique physical spaces as well as through your own senses.' It is at once painfully earnest—Munk is determined to use the restaurant to raise awareness about social issues that matter to him—and, thanks to a price tag only an oligarch could love, nosebleed-inducingly elitist. The restaurant veers precipitously between the sublime and the tacky. It is at once hedonistic and high-minded; derivative and inventive; outrageously elitist and charmingly naïve; provocatively boundary-pushing and prodigiously kooky. It is, in other words, that rarest of things in this age of globally homogenous dining and Airbnb aesthetics: idiosyncratic."

== Research and philanthropy ==
Alchemist's research team has focused on developing new ingredients and experimental foods. Initiatives include creating edible proteins from silkworm silk, brewing tea from silkworm frass, producing yogurt with ants, and studying seasonality in butterfly flavors. The team collaborates with the Technical University of Denmark on sustainable food research involving seaweed and fungi, and with the MIT Media Lab on space food experiments, including fermentation tests in space and work with simulated moon soil.

Alchemist also works with farmers to repurpose unused produce into new dishes and drinks, including the "Fur Martini," which incorporates rabbit ears.

Alchemist has developed food technology projects beyond fine dining. It has collaborated with the children's ward at Rigshospitalet, Copenhagen's main hospital, to support children undergoing cancer treatment. Among the initiatives is an app to assist children undergoing cancer treatment in selecting food, the introduction of new technology into hospital kitchens, and the production of a protein-rich ice cream for patients recovering from cancer. Alchemist also contributes to the design of the future Mary Elizabeth's Hospital (opening in 2027) as specialist advisors for a pilot project aiming to improve hospital food.

During the COVID-19 pandemic, Munk used Alchemist's kitchens to support the Copenhagen-based nonprofit organization JunkFood, which provided meals to the city's homeless population.

== Awards and recognitions ==
=== The World's 50 Best Restaurants ===
- 2021: 58th Best Restaurant in the World
- 2022: 18th Best Restaurant in the World
- 2023: 5th Best Restaurant in the World
- 2024: 8th Best Restaurant in the World
- 2025: 5th Best Restaurant in the World
- 2026: 3rd Best Restaurant in the World

=== Other ===
In 2023, Alchemist received the Gin Mare Art of Hospitality Award. The restaurant also won the Grand Prix at the Star Wine List of the Year International Final and the Gold Star for Best Digestif List at the Star Wine List of the Year Denmark Awards. The following year, it received the award for Best Long List from Star Wine List.

In 2024, Rasmus Munk was named Best Chef in the World by The Best Chef Awards.

In 2025, Alchemist was named Europe's best restaurant by Opinionated About Dining for the fifth consecutive year, marking the longest streak at the top in the list's history. That same year, Michelin Guide awarded the Service Award to Lykke Metzger, Alchemist's general manager.

== See also ==
- List of Michelin-starred restaurants in Denmark
- Molecular gastronomy
