= Lima (restaurant) =

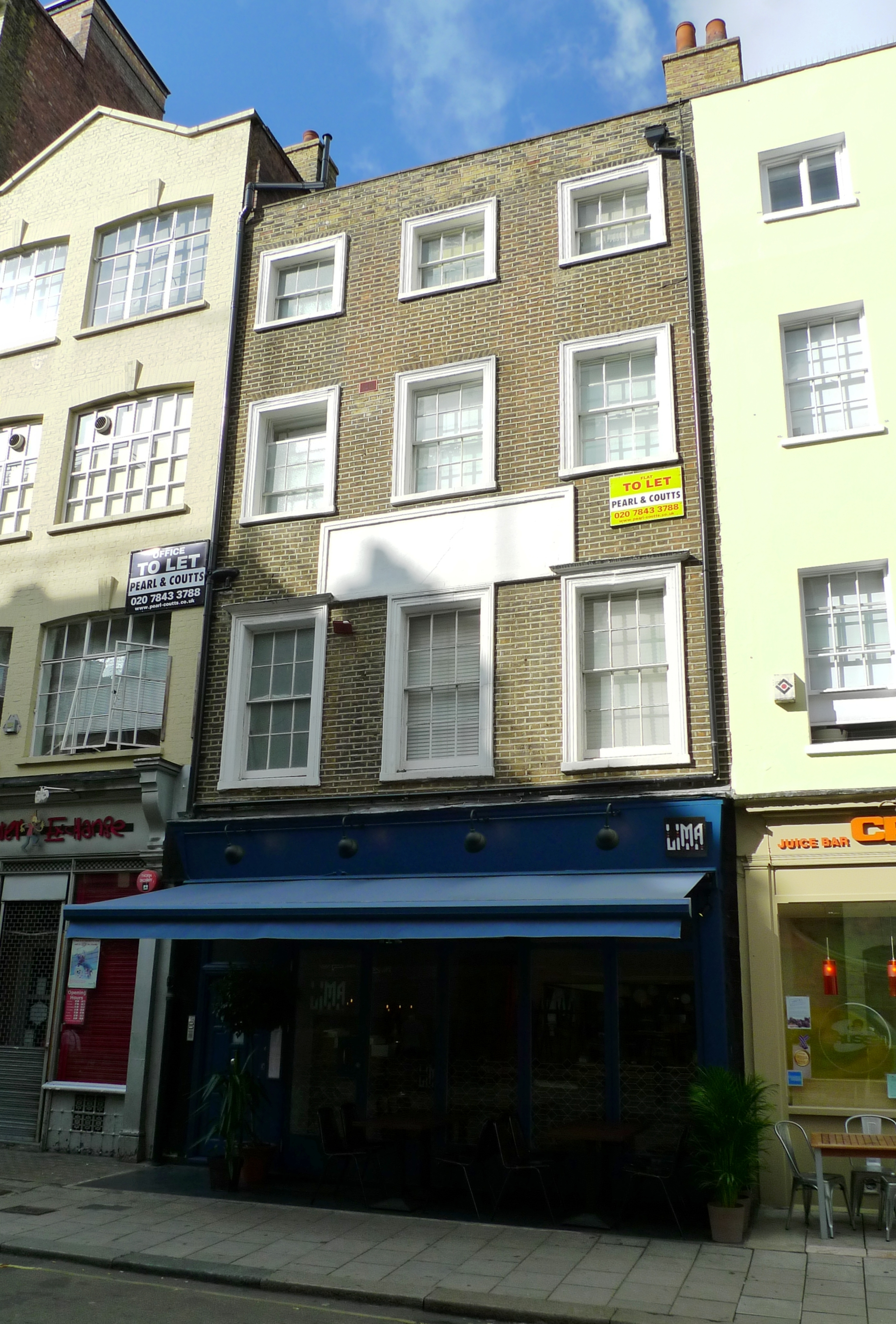
- Lima, 2012

- The location of Lima within London

Restaurant information
- Established: 2012; 14 years ago
- Owner: Gabriel Gonzalez
- Head chef: Roberto Ortiz
- Chef: Virgilio Martínez Véliz
- Food type: Peruvian cuisine
- Rating: (Michelin Guide 2014)
- Location: Rathbone Place, London, W1, United Kingdom
- Coordinates: 51.517733°N 0.134417°W
- Other information: Nearest station: Tottenham Court Road
- Website: www.limalondon.com

Lima is a restaurant in London, England, which serves Peruvian cuisine. The chef patron is Diego Recarte, after the restaurant was spearheaded by Virgilio Martínez. In 2014, it was awarded a Michelin star, the first time a restaurant serving this cuisine had been awarded a star in Europe. In 2025, LIMA opened another restaurant in Shoreditch.

== Description ==
Lima was founded and owned by Gabriel and Jose Luis Gonzalez, in conjunction with Peruvian chef Virgilio Martínez Véliz.[1][2] In October 2025, Diego Recarte takes over the kitchen (trained at the Argentine Institute of Gastronomy, with experience at Astrid y Gastón, D.O.M., Pakta, and Le Calandre).

The interior of Lima was designed by Erik Munro, and features a mural whilst the rest of the restaurant is beige. The restaurant is small and narrow, and mirrors are used to give the impression of greater space. A skylight lights the rear of the restaurant, the remainder of which is lit by candles and industrial-style lamps. The kitchen is open to the dining area of the restaurant.

== Reception ==
Fay Maschler visited Lima shortly after it opened in July 2012 for the London Evening Standard. She praised the combination of colours on the dishes, and thought that a dish of octopus, with quinoa, shiso and botija olives was a good advertisement for a wider use of octopus. She thought that a lamb shoulder in main course had been rendered for too long, but enjoyed the accompaniments. She gave the restaurant a rating of four out of five. John Walsh whilst writing for The Independent in September 2012, also enjoyed the octopus dish and called it "densely tasty". He described the lamb shoulder dish as "amazingly soft, the meat meltingly fibrous" and thought the accompaniment of poached grapes on black quinoa gave a suitable contrast. He gave the food four out of five and the ambience and service three out of five.

The review in the Time Out magazine for London in October 2012 enjoyed the suckling pig with rough corn mash, but thought that the dulce de leche ice-cream had too many accompaniments, such as a beetroot emulsion and pieces of maca root. Matthew Norman reviewed the restaurant in September 2013 for The Daily Telegraph described Lima as "a ridiculously perfect amalgam of taste and aesthetics". He called the sea bream ceviche a "thrillingly intense marvel", and said that the best dish he had was the beef pachamanca crusted with huacatay. Norman gave the restaurant a score of five out of five.

Lima was awarded a Michelin star in the 2014 Michelin Guide. Gonzalez described this as a "great surprise" and a "stamp of credibility for Peruvian food". It was the first time a restaurant serving Peruvian cuisine in Europe had been awarded a Michelin star. In the 2013 list of the best restaurants in the UK compiled by the National Restaurant Awards, Lima was unlisted but was named as the "restaurant to watch". In the following year's list it entered for the first time at number 68.

== See also ==
- List of Peruvian restaurants
