= Disfrutar =

Restaurant in Barcelona

Coordinates: 41°23′16″N 2°09′11″E

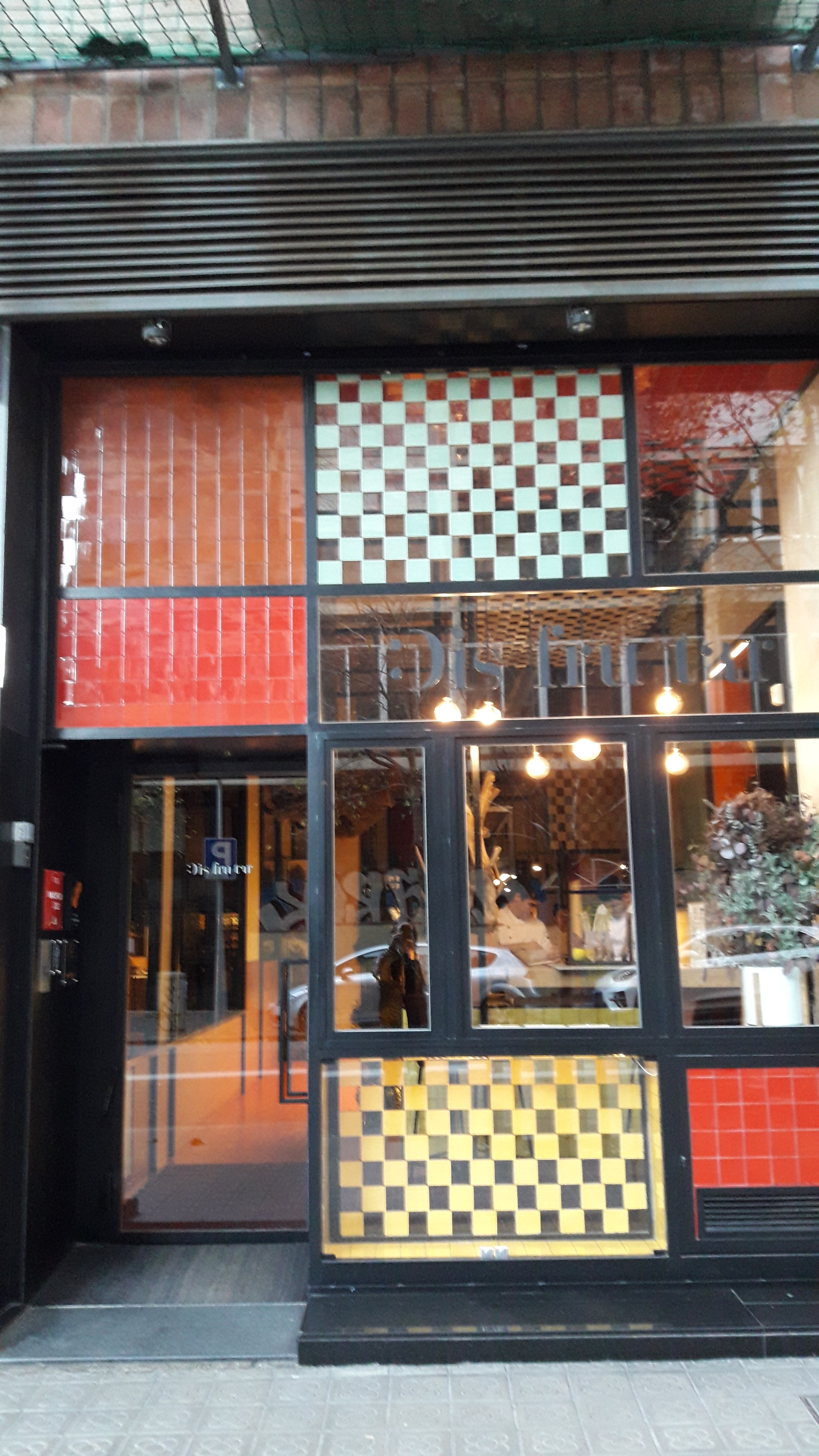
- Entrance to Disfrutar
- Interactive map of Disfrutar

Restaurant information
- Established: December 2014
- Chef: Eduard Xatruch; Oriol Castro; Mateu Casañas
- Rating: 3 Michelin stars
- Location: Villarroel 163, Barcelona, 08036, Spain
- Website: disfrutarbarcelona.com

Disfrutar is a restaurant in Barcelona with three Michelin stars.

In 2023 it was ranked second in the world by Restaurant magazine; in 2024 it was ranked first.

The chefs met while working at El Bulli.

== See also ==
- List of Michelin-starred restaurants in Spain
