= Mirazur =

Restaurant information
- Established: 2006; 19 years ago
- Owner: Mauro Colagreco
- Head chef: Mauro Colagreco
- Food type: Modernist cuisine
- Dress code: None
- Rating: Michelin Guide, the best restaurant in the World 2019
- Location: 30, avenue Aristide Briand, Menton, France
- Coordinates: 43.7859°N 7.5280°E
- Website: www.mirazur.fr

Mirazur is a restaurant in Menton, France rated with three stars by the Michelin Guide.

The restaurant is run by Argentine chef Mauro Colagreco, who previously worked with Bernard Loiseau, Alain Passard, Alain Ducasse and Guy Martin. He opened Mirazur in 2006 at the age of 29. He was awarded his first Michelin star within a year, followed by the second star in 2012. In 2019, Colagreco became the first chef not born in France to be awarded three stars in the French edition of the Guide Michelin.

== Awards ==
=== World's 50 Best Restaurants ===
In 2019, Mirazur was voted the best restaurant in the world in the Restaurant Top 50. It had been in 3rd place in 2018 and 4th in 2017. The Top 50 first featured Mirazur in 2009, in 35th place, and it climbed the list over the following years, including a jump from 28th place to 11th in 2014.
