= Osteria Francescana =

Restaurant in Modena, Italy

Coordinates: 44°38′41″N 10°55′17″E

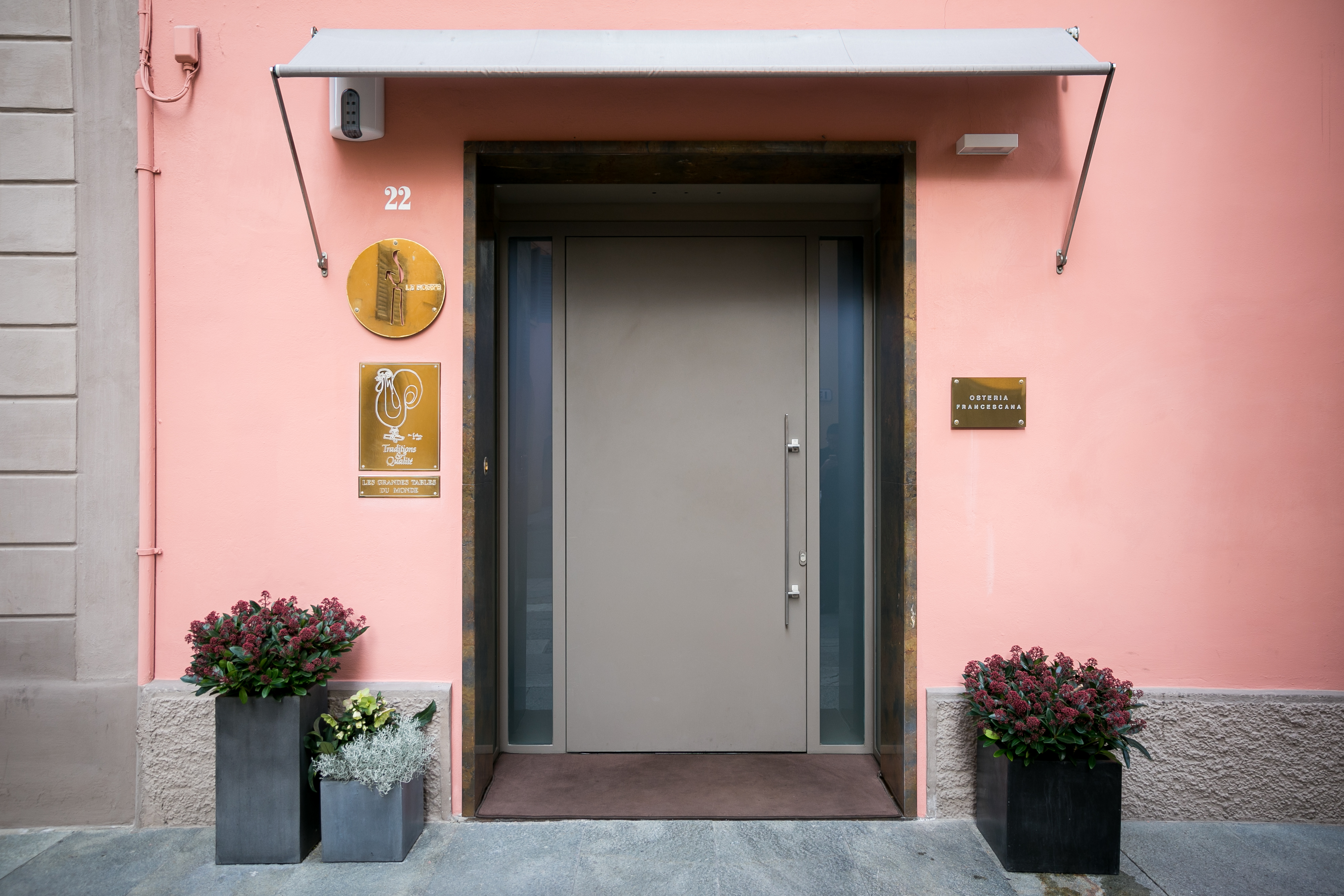
- Interactive map of Osteria Francescana

Restaurant information
- Established: 1995; 31 years ago
- Owner: Massimo Bottura
- Head chef: Massimo Bottura
- Food type: Modernist cuisine
- Dress code: None
- Rating: The Best Restaurant in the World (2018)
- Location: Via Stella 22, Modena, 41121, Italy
- Website: www.osteriafrancescana.it

Osteria Francescana (Italian: [osteˈriːa frantʃeˈskaːna]; "Franciscan Tavern") is a restaurant owned and run by chef Massimo Bottura in Modena, Italy.

In 2016 and 2018, William Reed Business Media named Osteria Francescana the best restaurant in the world that year in their annual The World's 50 Best Restaurants.

== Awards ==
In 2016 and 2018, it was rated as the world's best restaurant in the World's 50 Best Restaurants. It was the first Italian restaurant to earn the award. It was also second best in 2015 and third best in 2013 and 2014.

Osteria Francescana is rated with three stars by the Michelin Guide, three "forks" by Gambero Rosso, and holds the first position on the Italian food guide l'Espresso - Ristoranti d'Italia with a score of 20/20.

== Reviews ==
Katherine LaGrave, writing in Condé Nast Traveler, praised Osteria Francescana's "lack of pretense" and said its classics remained a surprise, despite the media attention. Tanya Gold, writing in The Guardian in 2016, said "some of it is delicious", but not her "kind of food". Richard Vines, writing in Bloomberg Businessweek in 2014, said lunch was "three hours of pleasure".

== In popular media ==
Osteria Francescana is depicted as a location in the Master of None TV series, Season 2, Episode 2.

The restaurant is also featured in Season 1, Episode 1 of Chef’s Table and Season 2, Episode 1 of Somebody Feed Phil, both Netflix original series.

== See also ==
- List of Michelin starred restaurants
- List of Michelin-starred restaurants in Italy
