= Daniel Hunter =

Daniel Hunter may refer to:

- Daniel Hunter (gridiron football) (born 1962), American gridiron football player
- Daniel Hunter (musician), founder of Analog Rebellion
- Daniel Hunter (volleyball) (born 1990), British volleyball player
- Daniel Hunter (swimmer) (born 1994), New Zealand swimmer

== See also ==
- Danielle Hunter, American football player
- Dan Hunter (disambiguation)
