= Central (restaurant) =

Restaurant in Lima

- Interactive map of Central

Restaurant information
- Established: 2008
- Owner: Virgilio Martínez Véliz
- Head chef: Virgilio Martínez Véliz
- Food type: Contemporary Peruvian
- Dress code: None
- Rating: Nº1 (2023) The World's 50 Best Restaurants; Nº1 (2015) Latin America's 50 Best Restaurants
- Location: Av. Pedro de Osma 301, Barranco, Lima, Lima, 18, Peru
- Coordinates: 12°07′57″S 77°01′40″W
- Website: centralrestaurante.com.pe

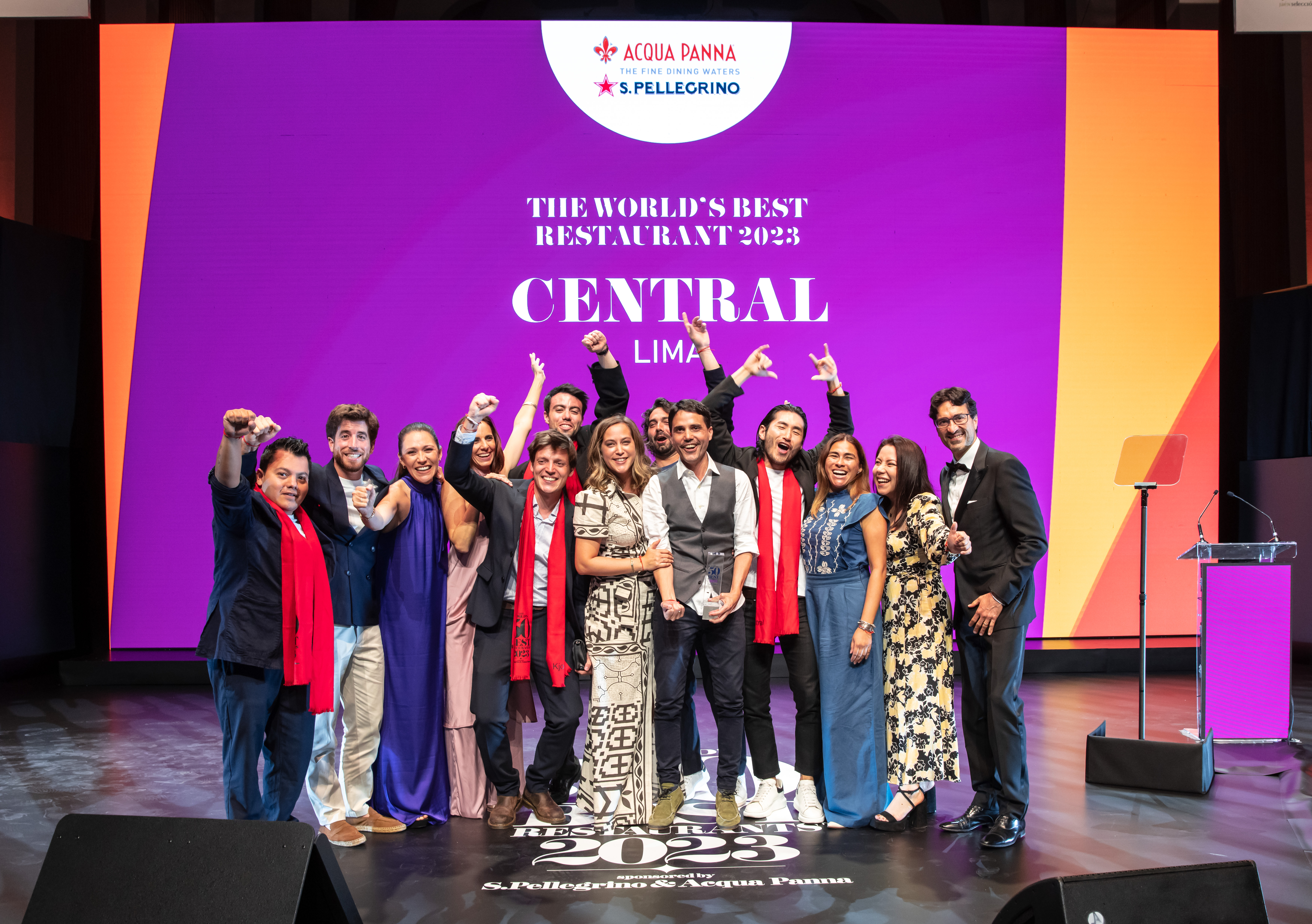
The staff receiving the World's 50 Best Restaurants ranking in 2023

Central is a restaurant located in the Barranco District, Lima, Peru. Central is the flagship restaurant of Peruvian chef, Virgilio Martínez Véliz, and serves as his workshop in the investigation and integration of indigenous Peruvian ingredients into the restaurant's menu. The restaurant is known for its contemporary interpretation and presentation of Peruvian cuisine. GQ Latinoamérica calls Central "the heart of his Virgilio Martínez Véliz gastronomic philosophy." In 2012, Central was named Best Restaurant of Peru by the Peruvian dining guide, SUMMUM. In 2013, Central entered as number 50 in The World's 50 Best Restaurants as awarded by the British magazine Restaurant., and in 2014 jumped 35 places receiving "Highest Climber" recognition and ranking as number 15 in the world. On August 21, 2014, Central for the third consecutive year was awarded Best Restaurant of Peru by the Peruvian Dining Guide, SUMMUM, and additionally received awards for Best Contemporary Peruvian cuisine and Best Sommelier.

Central has been named the best restaurant in Latin America for 3 consecutive years (2014, 2015, and 2016) and ranked 2nd in 2017, and again at number 1 in 2022. It is also ranked among the World's 50 Best Restaurants ranking 4th in the world in 2015 and 2016, 5th in 2017, 6th in 2018, and 2nd in 2022.

In 2023, it earned the No. 1 spot on the World's 50 Best Restaurants ranking.

== Cuisine ==
The cuisine at Central is Contemporary Peruvian, and founder Virgilio Martínez Véliz has attempted to redefine Peruvian cuisine by introducing little-known indigenous ingredients from Peru's coastal region, the Andes highlands, and the Amazon rainforest. Examples of such ingredients include kushuru (cushuro), an edible cyanobacteria harvested in high-altitude wetlands; arracacha, a root vegetable from the Andes; and arapaima, a freshwater fish found in the Amazon River. Chef and restaurant commentator Geeta Bansal describes the cuisine as "fresh, and contemporary with beautiful plates."

== Staff ==
Owner and founder Virgilio Martínez Véliz formerly worked at restaurants such as Lutèce (New York City); Can Fabes (Sant Celoni); and served as executive chef at Astrid & Gastón in both Bogotá and Madrid. The Chef de cuisine is Pía León, wife of Martínez Véliz. The two worked together for two years before marrying in Lima on May 4, 2013. The restaurant's wine director is American-born Gregory Thomas Smith.

== Legal status ==
Central restaurant originally opened and operated illegally in a residential area in the Miraflores district. In 2009, Manuel Masías Oyanguren, the mayor of Mirafores, closed the restaurant and stated that it wouldn't open again, enforcing the zoning laws approved since 2006. The restaurant continued to operate until 2010, when it finally closed. Later in the same year, Central opened again thanks to a court order. That court order was later annulled, but Central filed an appeal and is waiting for the decision. Since then, Central has moved districts to Barranco.
