= War of the Bands =

Military history of Spain

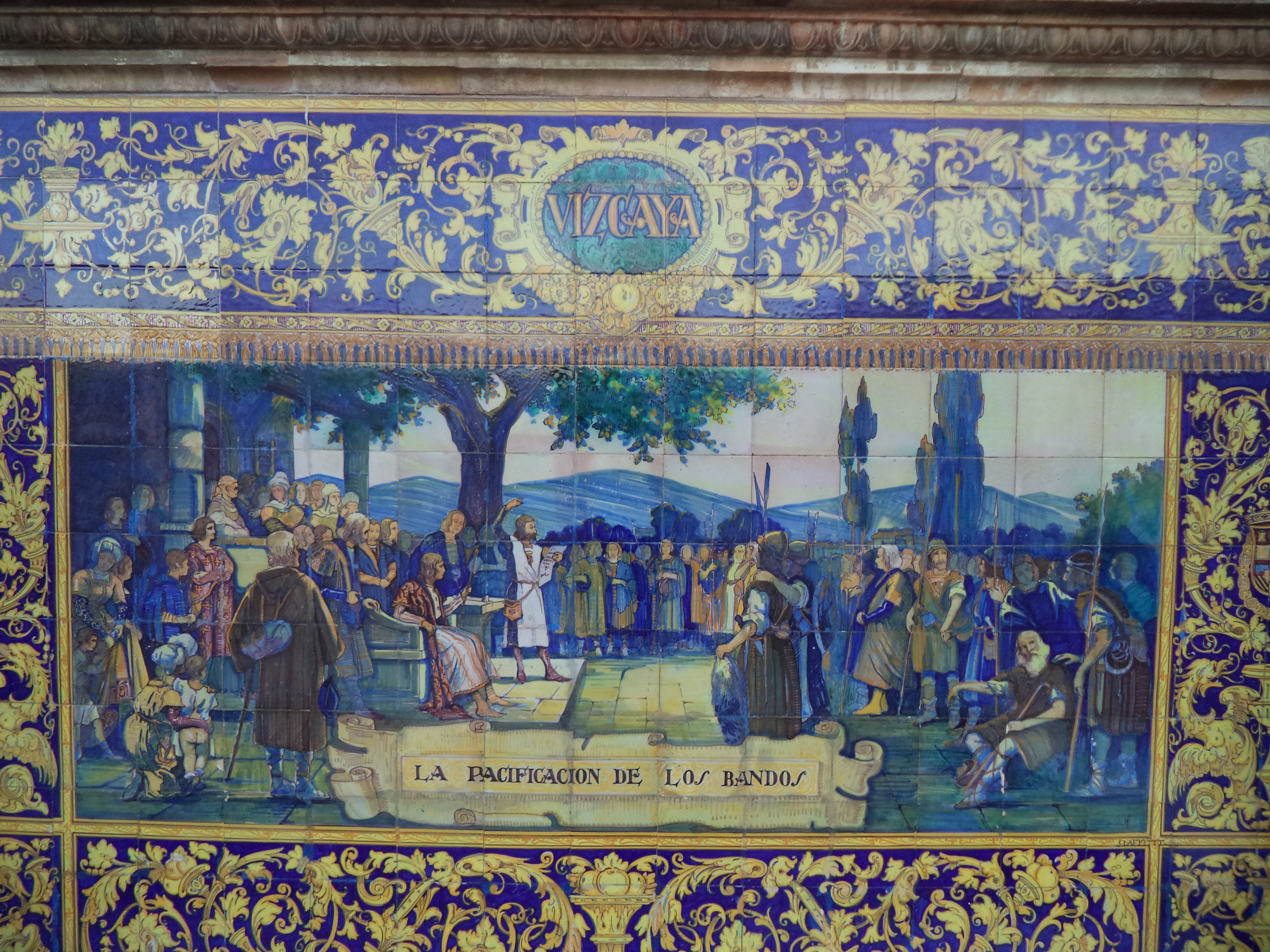
The pacification of the sides on the Banco de Vizcaya at the Plaza de España in Sevilla.

The War of the Bands (Basque: Bando gerrak, Spanish: Guerra de los Bandos) was a civil war, really an extended series of blood feuds, in the western Basque Country, Cantabria, Gascony, and Navarre in the Late Middle Ages. The primary source for the War is Las Bienandanças e fortunas by Lope García de Salazar, written c.1471. The war is named after the aristocratic networks of familial alliances and their armed followings, known as bandos (factions or "bands"), that carried out constant wars for power and honour across three kingdoms. The wars ceased only with the imposition of royal authority under Ferdinand II of Aragon and Isabella of Castile, the Catholic Monarchs.

The wars resulted partly from the destabilising effect of the Castilian Civil War of 1351–1369 and the ensuing political weakness of the House of Trastámara. That the Seniory of Biscay effectively ceased to exist after 1370 and was subsumed in 1379 into Castile only exacerbated the effects of political anarchy on Biscay. The rise of the towns, notably Bilbao and Bermeo, caused jockeying for municipal power between the rich urban families. The landed nobility, enfeoffed in the heavily encastellated countryside, nursed feuds that dated back centuries. The Legizamon and Zamudiano had been enemies since 1270. Many minor noble families were caught in the feuds of the great families by ties of marriage.

In 1362, in the early stage of the conflicts, the Legizamon and Zurbarán families fought a battle in the streets of Bilbao. They battled again in the market of Bermeo in 1413. Thereafter until 1433 the fighting between the two bands continued without a truce. The Basurto, who had been enemies of the Legizamon over the rights to a salmon, fought on the side of the Zurbarán. The urban warfare was less fatal than the pitched battles often fought in the countryside: only five men died in a fracas in Bilbao in 1440 and ten in the streets of Bermeo in 1443.

In 1413 a private war broke out between Juan de Sant Pedro, from the Labourd in the English Duchy of Gascony, and the Navarrese houses of the Espeleta and the Alzate. After the head of the Alzate and his son were killed, Lord Fernando of the Gamboa family of Gipuzkoa married his son to the daughter and heiress of the Alzate. In consequence he led an attack on Juan de Sant Pedro to avenge his daughter-in-law's family. He was defeated and killed and 150 men died in the battle.

Around 1420 the Gamboinos extended their feuding with an assault by night on the Oñaz family, also of Guipúzcoa. On Christmas, the Oñaz' manor was set alight and the head of the house plus nine others died in the blaze. The Oñaz family lands were then ravaged by the Gamboinos and their allies, but the allies of the Oñaz came to their defence. Of the latter, the Lezcano attacked the Gamboino-allied Balda family and killed its leader. With the end of this little war a whole new network of blood feuds had come into being.

The Gamboinos and the Balda fought against the Oñaz and the Lezcano at Zumarraga in 1446. The Oñaz were victorious and burnt the Gamboino fortress at Azkoitia. Seventy men and twelve of the leaders were killed. The families, with every wider networks of allies, engaged again in 1447 and 1448.

As early as 1390 and 1393 warring in Biscay had been reduced by the intervention of the royalist hermandades, capable of drawing on the revenues of royal estates. In 1415 the corregidor, the royally-appointed governor of the hermandad, acting on royal orders, siphoned off Biscayan wheat to the Asturias, inciting a rebellion. The Biscayans were defeated at Erandio with the loss of sixty men and the wheat transfers continued. In 1442 the hermandades interfered successfully in Bilbao and Mondragón, but the peace established did not endure. In 1457 the war between the Gamboinos and the Oñaz was brought to an abrupt end when the hermandades rebelled against them both, seized their manors, and expelled their leaders from Guipúzcoa.
