= The World's 50 Best Restaurants =

List produced by William Reed Ltd

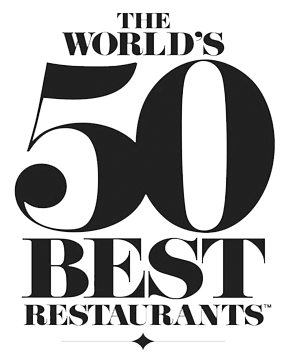
The World's 50 Best Restaurants logo

The World's 50 Best Restaurants is a list produced by the UK media company William Reed, which originally appeared in the British magazine Restaurant in 2002. The list and awards are no longer directly related to Restaurant, though they are owned by the same media company.

In addition to the main 1–50 ranking, the organisation awards a series of special prizes for individuals and restaurants, including the One To Watch Award, the Icon Award, the Best Female Chef Award and the Chefs' Choice Award, the latter based on votes from the fifty head chefs from the restaurants on the previous year's list. In specific regions the organisation also pre-announces a 51–100 list, showcasing more venues in the area. Often working as a barometer of global gastronomic trends, the list showcases a variety of cuisines from all over the world.

== History ==
The World's 50 Best Restaurants list first appeared as a feature in the British magazine Restaurant in 2002. Shortly afterwards, an awards night was established to celebrate the release of the list. The results are published via the World's 50 Best Restaurants social media channels and on the World's 50 Best Restaurants website on the awards night.

The World's 50 Best Restaurants list is the result of a poll of over 1,000 independent experts, who each cast votes for establishments where they have enjoyed their best restaurant experiences. The World's 50 Best Restaurants Academy is gender-balanced and contains 27 regions around the world. Each region has a chairperson (Academy Chair), and that chairperson assembles 40 people (including themselves) to vote. This panel is an equal mix of leading chefs and restaurateurs in that region, food journalists and critics, and well-travelled gourmets. Under usual circumstances, at least 25% of the panellists from each region change each year.

The World's 50 Best Restaurants' voting process and results are subject to independent adjudication by Deloitte.

There are no criteria for voting. The organisation allows the 1,080 voters to make up their own minds, and collates their votes to create the list.

Since 2013, William Reed has also published regional restaurant lists Asia's 50 Best Restaurants and Latin America's 50 Best Restaurants, and launched Middle East & North Africa's 50 Best Restaurants in February 2022.

A rule introduced in 2019 disqualifies previous winners from competing. Noma qualified again in 2021 because it closed in 2016 and reopened in a new location and concept.

== Best restaurants ==
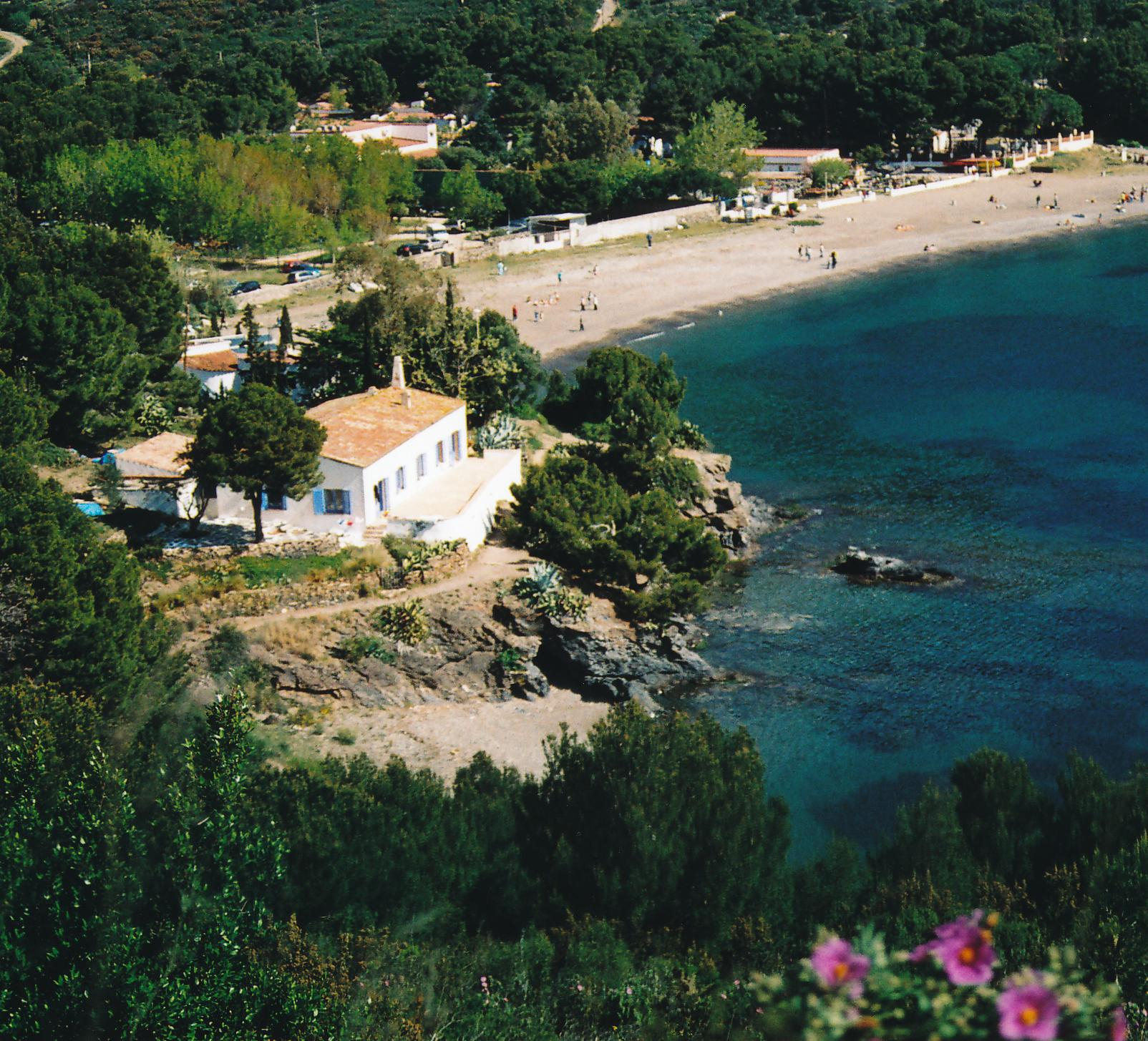
El Bulli

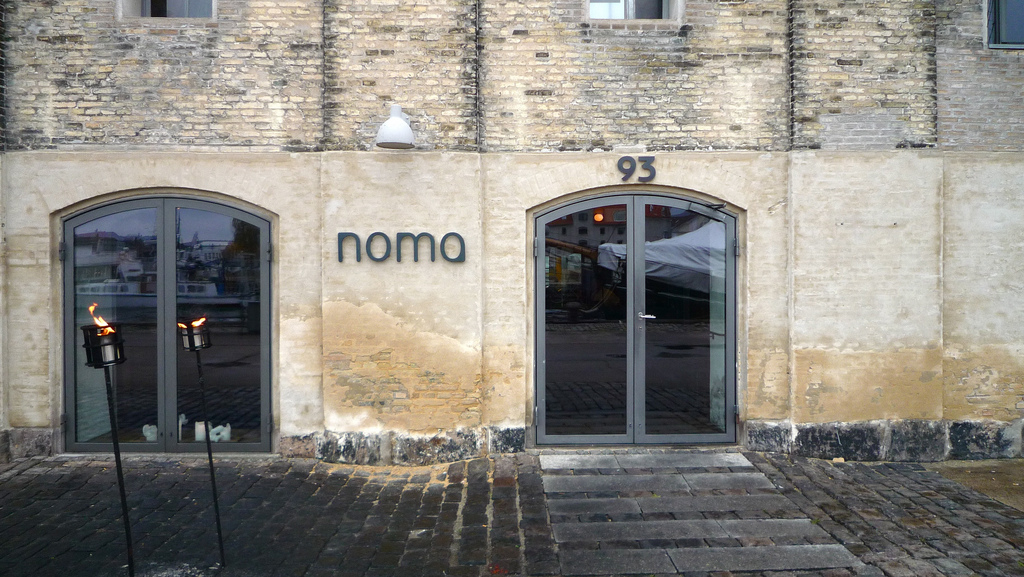
Noma's former storefront

World's Best Restaurants
Year	1st	2nd	3rd
2002	(Spain) El Bulli	(United Kingdom) Gordon Ramsay	(United States) The French Laundry
2003	(United States) The French Laundry	(Spain) El Bulli	(Monaco) Le Louis XV
2004	(United States) The French Laundry	(United Kingdom) The Fat Duck	(Spain) El Bulli
2005	(United Kingdom) The Fat Duck	(Spain) El Bulli	(United States) The French Laundry
2006	(Spain) El Bulli	(United Kingdom) The Fat Duck	(France) Pierre Gagnaire
2007	(Spain) El Bulli	(United Kingdom) The Fat Duck	(France) Pierre Gagnaire
2008	(Spain) El Bulli	(United Kingdom) The Fat Duck	(France) Pierre Gagnaire
2009	(Spain) El Bulli	(United Kingdom) The Fat Duck	(Denmark) Noma
2010	(Denmark) Noma	(Spain) El Bulli	(United Kingdom) The Fat Duck
2011	(Denmark) Noma	(Spain) El Celler de Can Roca	(Spain) Mugaritz
2012	(Denmark) Noma	(Spain) El Celler de Can Roca	(Spain) Mugaritz
2013	(Spain) El Celler de Can Roca	(Denmark) Noma	(Italy) Osteria Francescana
2014	(Denmark) Noma	(Spain) El Celler de Can Roca	(Italy) Osteria Francescana
2015	(Spain) El Celler de Can Roca	(Italy) Osteria Francescana	(Denmark) Noma
2016	(Italy) Osteria Francescana	(Spain) El Celler de Can Roca	(United States) Eleven Madison Park
2017	(United States) Eleven Madison Park	(Italy) Osteria Francescana	(Spain) El Celler de Can Roca
2018	(Italy) Osteria Francescana	(Spain) El Celler de Can Roca	(France) Mirazur
2019	(France) Mirazur	(Denmark) Noma	(Spain) Asador Etxebarri
2021	(Denmark) Noma	(Denmark) Geranium	(Spain) Asador Etxebarri
2022	(Denmark) Geranium	(Peru) Central	(Spain) Disfrutar
2023	(Peru) Central	(Spain) Disfrutar	(Spain) DiverXO
2024	(Spain) Disfrutar	(Spain) Asador Etxebarri	(France) Table by Bruno Verjus
2025	(Peru) Maido	(Spain) Asador Etxebarri	(Mexico) Quintonil
2026	(Spain) Asador Etxebarri	(Thailand) Gaggan	(Denmark) Alchemist

== Best of the Best ==
As of 4 November 2026

In 2019, the Best of the Best category was created, a hall of fame for restaurants that have reached the pinnacle of the No.1 position in The World's 50 Best Restaurants list. With the creation of this list, No.1 winners are no longer eligible to be voted on new editions of the list.

The new iteration of Noma was eligible for The World's 50 Best Restaurants 2021 list due to three key changes from the original restaurant: its location, concept and ownership. As such, it was considered a new restaurant and eligible for the No.1 position in 2021. The previous version of Noma topped the 50 Best list on four occasions, in 2010, 2011, 2012 and 2014.

The following restaurants have been named No.1 in the World's 50 Best Restaurants since the list's inception and were therefore no longer eligible for voting:

- El Bulli (2002, 2006–2009)
- The French Laundry (2003–2004)
- The Fat Duck (2005)
- Noma (2010–2012, 2014, 2021)
- El Celler de Can Roca (2013, 2015)
- Osteria Francescana (2016, 2018)
- Eleven Madison Park (2017)
- Mirazur (2019)
- Geranium (2022)
- Central (2023)
- Disfrutar (2024)
- Maido (2025)
- Asador Etxebarri (2026)

== See also ==
- The World's 50 Best Bars
- List of Michelin 3-star restaurants
- Lists of restaurants
- La Liste – List of the world's best restaurants
