= Mugaritz =

Restaurant in Rentería, Spain

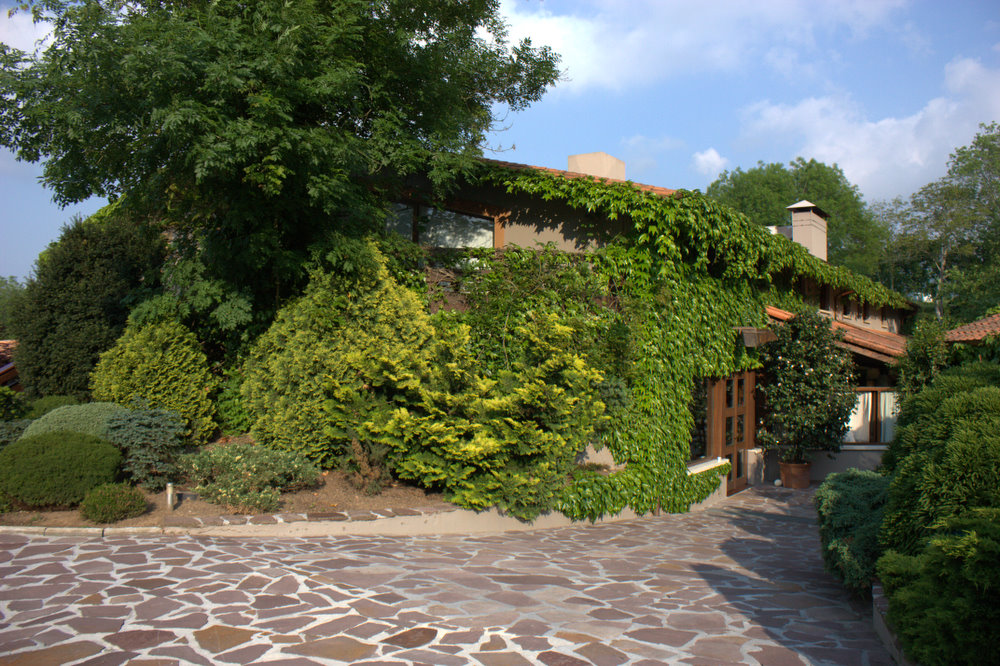
- Interactive map of Mugaritz

Restaurant information
- Established: 1998
- Owner: Andoni Luis Aduriz
- Chef: Andoni Luis Aduriz
- Food type: Creative
- Dress code: None
- Rating: (Michelin Guide)
- Location: Otzazulueta Baserria; Aldura Aldea 20, Errenteria, Gipuzkoa, Spain
- Coordinates: 43.272°N 1.917°W
- Seating capacity: 40
- Reservations: Yes
- Other information: 15 minutes from San Sebastián
- Website: www.mugaritz.com

Mugaritz is a restaurant in Rentería, Gipuzkoa, Spain. It was opened in March 1998 under the management of Chef Andoni Aduriz. It is considered one of the world's best restaurants since 2006 according to Restaurant Magazine and has been recently been ranked fourth in their list.

== History ==
The restaurant is recognized by the press as "the most important gastronomic phenomenon of the world in recent times". Both Mugaritz and Andoni Luis Aduriz frequently show up on pages of media like "Omnivore", "Le Figaro" in France, "Brutus", "Cuisine Kingdom" in Japan, "The Trade" and "Republic" in Latin America and the U.S. "Time" or "The Observer ". Mugaritz earned its first Michelin star in 2000 and, five years later, in 2005, the Michelin Guide awarded it a second one. The restaurant has also the highest rating by the Repsol Guide, the Three “Soles” and a multitude of honors for his innovative and creative activity in gastronomy.

== Fire ==
On the morning of 15 February 2010, a short circuit caused a serious fire in Mugaritz's kitchen, closing the restaurant for four months. After the fire, the team received thousands of expressions of solidarity from around the world, which motivated them to keep working.

== Books ==
- La joven cocina vasca (1996). Ixo editorial
- El mercado en el plato (1998). Ixo editorial
- Tabula Huevo (2000). Ixo editorial
- Foie Gras (2002). Ixo editorial
- Tabula Bacalao (2003). Montagud editores
- Clorofilia (2004). Ixo editorial
- Txikichef (2006). Hariadna editorial.
- Bestiarium Gastronomicae (2006). Ixo editorial
- Tabula 35 mm (2007). Ixo editorial
- Diccionario Botánico para Cocineros (2007). Ixo editorial
- La botánica del deseo (2008). Prólogo de la edición en castellano del libro de Michael Pollan.
- Las primeras palabras de la cocina (2009). Ixo editorial
- Los Bajos de la Alta Cocina (2009). Ixo editorial
- El Dilema del Omnívoro (2011). Prólogo de la edición en castellano del libro de Michael Pollan.
- El Gourmet Extraterrestre (2011). Editorial Planeta.
- Larousse Gastronomique (2011). Editorial Larousse. Edición revisada y prologada por A. Luis Aduriz.
- Innovación abierta y alta cocina (2011). Ediciones Pirámide
- Mugaritz - A Natural Science of Cooking - (2012). Editorial Phaidon Press / RBA / Kosmos
- Cocinar, comer, convivir (2012). Ediciones Destino.
- Mugaritz. La cocina como ciencia natural (2012). RBA
- Mugaritz BSO (2012). Ixo producciones
