= Kamilla Seidler =

Danish chef (born 1983)

- Born: 1983 (age 42–43); Copenhagen, Denmark
- Education: Copenhagen Hospitality College
- Culinary career
- Cooking style: Bolivian cuisine
- Current restaurant: Gustu
- Award won: Best Female Chef by Latin America's 50 Best Restaurants 2016
- Website: kamillaseidler.com

Kamilla Seidler (born 1983) is a Danish chef, who is the head chef at restaurant Gustu in La Paz, Bolivia. In 2016, she was named the Best Female chef Latin America's 50 Best Restaurants.

== Career ==
Kamilla Seidler was born in Copenhagen, Denmark, in 1983, as the oldest of eight siblings. She began working in restaurants at 15, and at 21 underwent training at the Copenhagen Hospitality College. After graduating, she worked at several well known restaurants such as Belmond Le Manoir aux Quat'Saisons and Mugaritz.

Seidler was invited to cook for Claus Meyer as part of an interview for a Bolivian food movement he was looking to set up. He was happy with the dishes she served, and offered her the position. Four months later, Seidler and her partner Michelangelo Cestari travelled to La Paz, Bolivia, where she became head chef of the restaurant Gustu.

At the restaurant, she serves dishes which she bases on a new Bolivian cuisine which she says is similar to an early New Nordic movement. In 2016, Seidler was named the Best Female Chef by Latin America's 50 Best Restaurants. In the list that year, Gustu was placed 16th. She took part in a project called the Kamilla Seidler expedition, where she travelled for four months to several countries, teaming with local food festivals and pop-ups.
