= The Standard, Copenhagen =

Restaurant complex in Denmark

Coordinates: 55.677803°N 12.591917°E

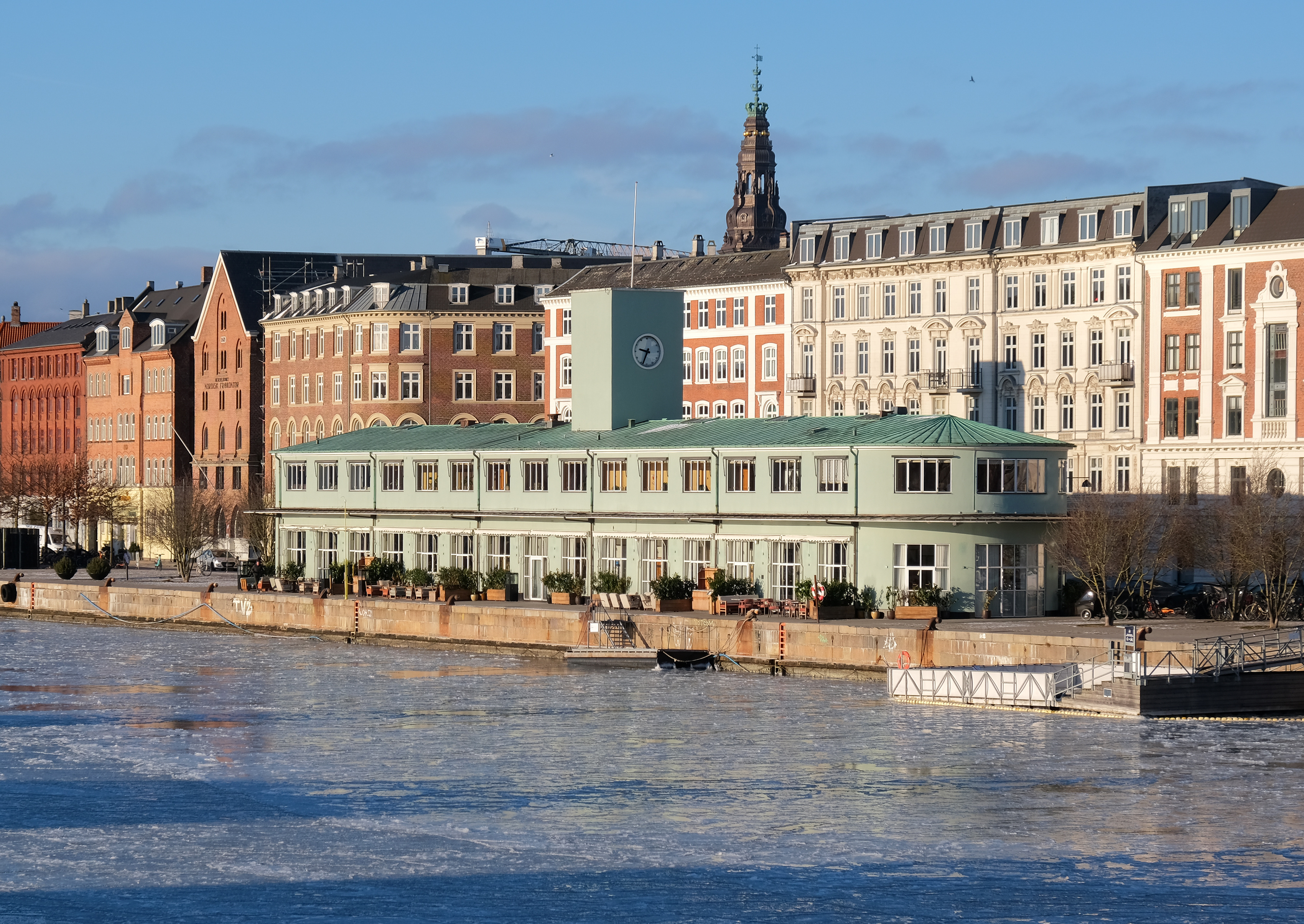
The Standard

The Standard is a restaurant complex located on the Havnegade quay in central Copenhagen, Denmark.

== History ==
The building was constructed in 1937 to a design by Kristoffer Varming and was then known as Gammelholms Toldkammer. The southern part of the building was used as a custom house for goods to and from Sweden. The northern part of the building contained the waiting room, kiosk and ticket office of the Øresund Ferries.

Vikingebådene, Centrumlinien and DSØ later used the building. The latter was a partnership between DSB and SJ. The last ferry departed on 30 April 2002, and the company later moved its administration to Amerikakaj.

The building was acquired by Terence Conran and converted into a restaurant complex in 2005. It contained the Japanese restaurant Ebisu, Italian restaurant Bachio and Custom House Bar & Grill. It closed in 2014.

The Standard was opened by a group of investors consisting of Claus Meyer, Niels Lan Doky, Torsten Vildgaard, Søren Westh and Karam Sethi. The complex was redesigned with the assistance of GamFratesi and Christina Meyer Bengtsson & Ulrik Nordentoft. Verandah, a high-end Indian restaurant, closed in September 2016.

== Restaurants ==
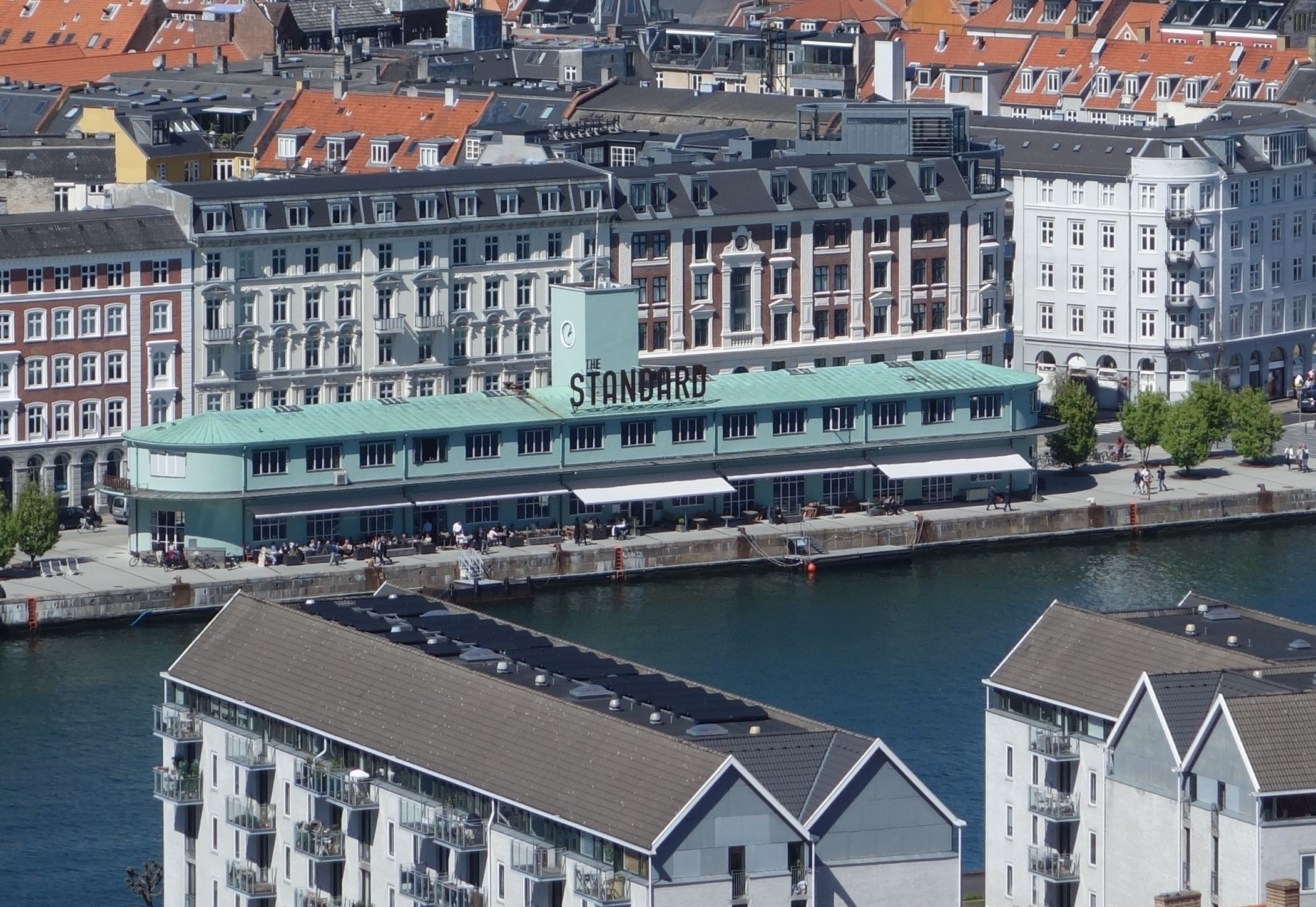
The Standard viewed from the tower of Church of Our Savour

The Standard used to house several restaurants, including STUD!O and Almanak.

STUD!O presents an international modern kitchen that draws inspiration from around the world, with ingredients and tastes from both the Scandinavian countries and more exotic places. Head chef Chilean Damian Quintana has managed to merge South American cuisine with the New Nordic kitchen. It received its first Michelin star in 2015. Almanak serves a more traditional but modernized version of Danish cuisine. Everything is completely made with local and seasonal ingredients in accordance with the New Nordic dogma.

Both restaurants moved out of The Standard in 2020. STUD!O is now in Carlsberg Byen, and Almanak has moved to the 4th balcony of the Royal Danish Opera House.
