= René Redzepi =

Danish chef (born 1977)

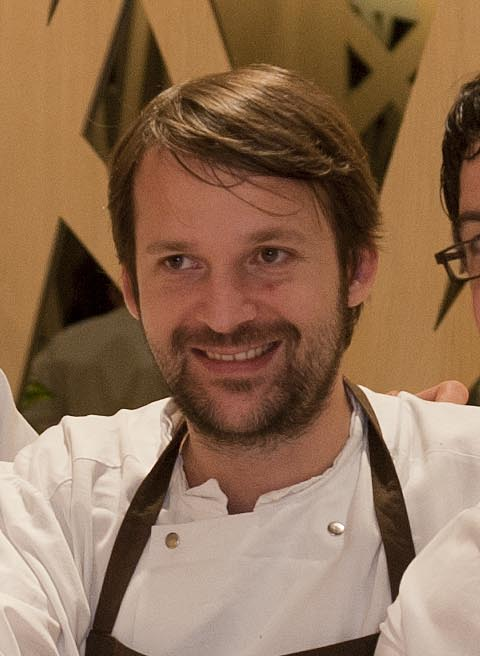
- René Redzepi in the restaurant Zaldiarán (Vitoria-Gasteiz, Spain)
- Born: Copenhagen, Denmark
- Education: Apprenticeship
- Culinary career
- Cooking style: New Nordic; Molecular gastronomy
- Current restaurant
- Noma

René Redzepi is a Danish chef and co-founder of Noma, a former three-Michelin-star restaurant in Copenhagen that was ranked five times as the Best Restaurant in the World. In January 2023, Redzepi announced that Noma would move away from traditional restaurant service; the restaurant's final regular service took place in Kyoto, Japan, in December 2024. Redzepi is noted for his efforts to reinvent and refine New Nordic cuisine. In 2024, the TV series Omnivore, which Redzepi created and in which he starred, was released on Apple TV+. In 2026, he stepped down from his leadership role at Noma after allegations of abuse emerged.

== Early life and education ==
Redzepi was born in Copenhagen, Denmark, to a Danish mother and an Albanian father from the former Yugoslavia's Socialist Republic of Macedonia (now the independent nation of North Macedonia).

When he was young, Redzepi's family moved to Yugoslavia and lived near the small city of Tetovo until 1992, the start of the Yugoslav Wars. Redzepi has said that he found life there very enjoyable compared to his time in a small apartment in Denmark. Redzepi lived in a rural area in a large multi-generation house where the family ate locally sourced food, most of it vegetarian and nutritious.

While Redzepi was still a youngster, the family moved back to Denmark, but he often spent his summers in Yugoslavia.

Redzepi has a twin brother, Kenneth. Both delivered newspapers and worked in a local store to contribute to the family's income.

When he was 15 years old, Redzepi left high school and enrolled in a cooking school with a friend.

== Career ==
After choosing a culinary career, Redzepi trained at a local family-owned and Michelin-starred restaurant called Pierre André in Copenhagen. There, he held an apprenticeship that lasted for four years. When he was 19 years old, he went to work at Le Jardin des Sens in Montpellier, in southern France.

Redzepi first visited El Bulli, a restaurant in Roses, Spain, as a guest in 1998 and subsequently worked there during the 1999 season.

Returning to Copenhagen, Redzepi began working at Kong Hans Kælder, one of the city's leading gourmet restaurants. In 2001, he spent four months under the supervision of Thomas Keller at the French Laundry, a restaurant in Yountville in California's Napa Valley, but returned to Kong Hans Kælder and Copenhagen.

In December 2002, when he was 24 years old, Redzepi was contacted by Claus Meyer, who had been offered the opportunity to operate a restaurant at the North Atlantic House, an 18th-century warehouse on Copenhagen harbour that was transformed into a cultural centre. The restaurant, Noma, was opened in 2004 with Redzepi as head chef. The name is a combination of the Danish words nordisk, which means Nordic, and mad, which means food.

Redzepi sources much of his food locally and does research by foraging for food in the wild. He said that this comes from his time living in Yugoslavia, where food was local and fresh. Much of the approach to the menu and food at Noma is based on seasonal themes and what is available at the time. Redzepi also focuses on fermentation and dehydration, experimenting with using as much of plants, meat, and fish as possible. Redzepi has occasionally served insects.

In 2011, Redzepi co-founded MAD, a non-profit organization and symposium focused on the future of food and the restaurant industry. The annual MAD symposium in Copenhagen brings together chefs, scientists, and writers to discuss topics including sustainability, kitchen culture, and the ethics of the food industry.

In January 2023, Redzepi announced that Noma would close as a traditional restaurant at the end of 2024, transitioning instead to a food innovation lab focused on developing new products and hosting periodic pop-up events. Noma held its final regular dinner service in December 2024 following a 10-week temporary residency in Kyoto, Japan. In July 2025, Redzepi announced a months-long Noma residency in Los Angeles, planned for spring 2026.

In March 2026, The New York Times published a report detailing allegations of abuse committed by Redzepi against his employees between 2009 and 2017. After protestors began demonstrating outside and sponsors started to withdraw their support, Redzepi announced his resignation from Noma on 12 March 2026. He also resigned from the board of MAD.

== Abuse allegations and criticisms of workplace culture ==
In a 2015 essay published in Lucky Peach magazine and carried on the MAD Feed website, Redzepi wrote: "I've been a bully for a large part of my career. I've yelled and pushed people." He described entering a state of "absolute rage" over minor mistakes and having witnessed chefs "get slapped across the face" in professional kitchens. In subsequent interviews, Redzepi stated he had undergone "many, many hours of therapy" to address his own behavior.

Noma's reliance on unpaid interns has drawn scrutiny from multiple media outlets. A 2022 Financial Times investigation found that the restaurant employed up to 30 unpaid interns alongside 34 paid chefs, with the interns working up to 70 hours per week while paying for their own housing in Copenhagen. A 2023 Vice investigation reported that approximately half of Noma's 60 kitchen staff were unpaid.

When Redzepi announced in January 2023 that Noma would close as a traditional restaurant, he told The New York Times: "It's unsustainable. Financially and emotionally, as an employer and as a human being, it just doesn't work." One former intern, Namrata Hegde, told the Times that interns were "required to work in silence" and "forbidden to laugh." The restaurant began paying its interns in October 2022, and this added an estimated $50,000 to $70,000 per month in labor costs.

In 2026, an article by The New York Times detailed accusations of abuse by Redzepi from 35 former Noma employees: "Between 2009 and 2017, they said, [Redzepi] punched employees in the face, jabbed them with kitchen implements and slammed them against walls. They described lasting trauma from layers of psychological abuse, including intimidation, body shaming and public ridicule." One female chef recalled being punched by him for using her smartphone to lower the volume of music after a guest requested it. She stated that the force of the blow made her fall against a metal counter, leaving her on the floor, bleeding and in tears. Another chef alleged that Redzepi crouched out of view of patrons, just inside the kitchen, and stabbed workers in the calves and thighs with a barbeque fork for perceived inefficiencies of service as they entered from the restaurant floor. It was also alleged that Redzepi used his influence in the culinary world to threaten employees and their families. According to the Times, Redzepi created an institutional culture of abuse at Noma that continued after 2017, while senior managers of the restaurant continually failed to address the mistreatment of employees and unpaid interns.

== Personal life ==
Redzepi is married to chef Nadine Levy Redzepi, who grew up in Portugal and Denmark. They have three daughters.

== Awards and accolades ==
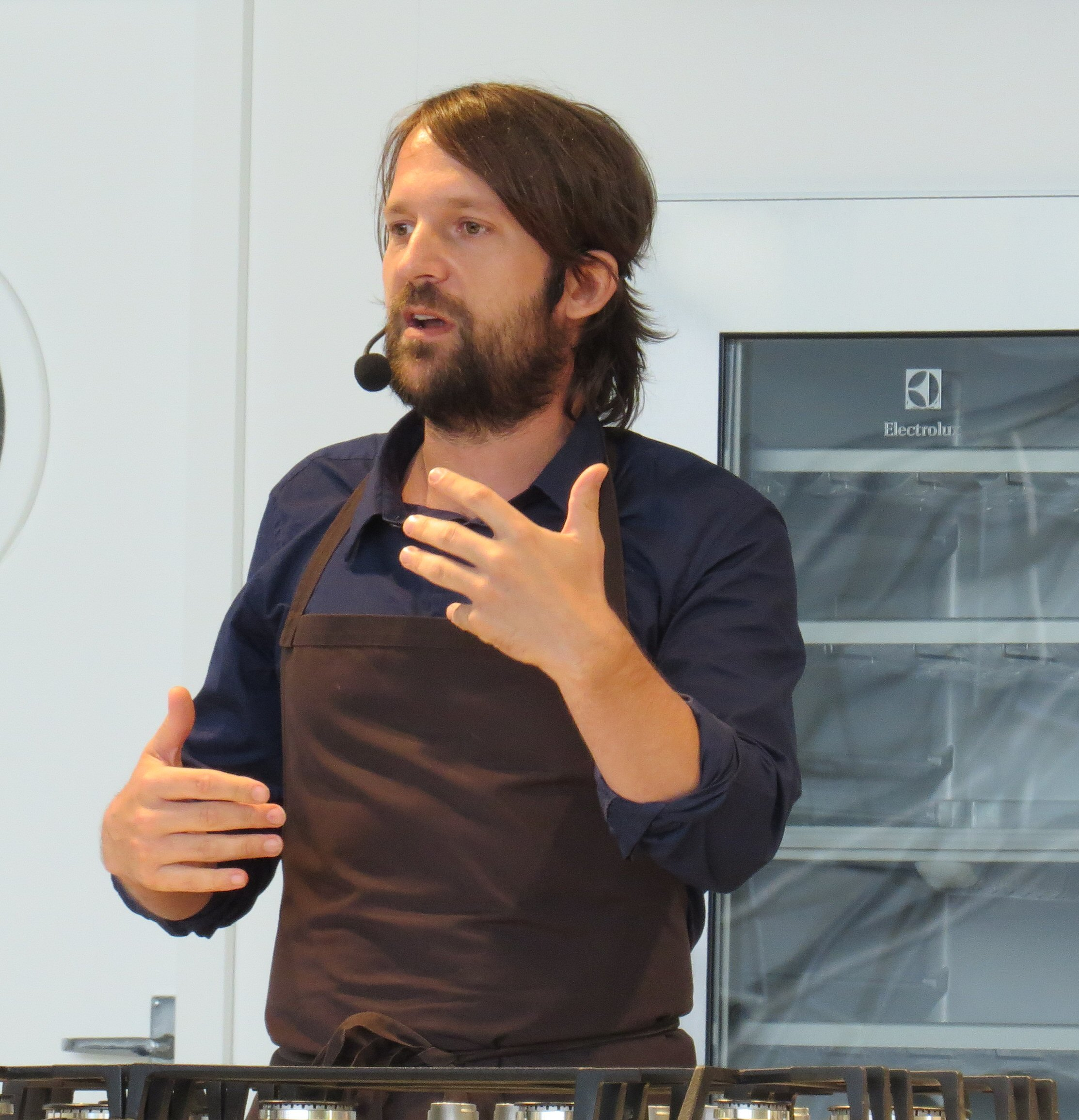
Rene Redzepi at taste London June 2014

- 2006: The World's 50 Best Restaurants, Restaurant – 33rd Best Restaurant in the World
- 2007: The World's 50 Best Restaurants, Restaurant – 15th Best Restaurant in the World
- 2008: The World's 50 Best Restaurants, Restaurant – 10th Best Restaurant in the World
- 2008: TripAdvisor, Best restaurant in the world
- 2008: Lo Mejor de la Gastronomia conference (San Sebastián, Spain), International Chef of the Year
- 2008–2020: Michelin Guide – two stars
- 2009: The World's 50 Best Restaurants, Restaurant – 3rd Best Restaurant in the World
- 2009: The World's 50 Best Restaurants, Restaurant – Chefs' Choice
- 2010: The World's 50 Best Restaurants, Restaurant – Best Restaurant in the World
- 2011: The World's 50 Best Restaurants, Restaurant – Best Restaurant in the World
- 2012: The World's 50 Best Restaurants, Restaurant – Best Restaurant in the World
- 2012: TIMES 2012 100 Most Influential People in the World
- 2013: The World's 50 Best Restaurants, Restaurant – 2nd Best Restaurant in the World
- 2014: The World's 50 Best Restaurants, Restaurant – Best Restaurant in the World
- 2015: The World's 50 Best Restaurants, Restaurant – 3rd Best Restaurant in the World
- 2016: The Catey Awards International Outstanding Achievement
- 2016: Bestowed Knight of The Order of the Dannebrog
- 2016: The World's 50 Best Restaurants, Restaurant – 5th Best Restaurant in the World
- 2019: The World's 50 Best Restaurants, Restaurant – 2nd Best Restaurant in the World
- 2021–2025: Michelin Guide – three stars
- 2021: The World's 50 Best Restaurants, Restaurant – Best Restaurant in the World

== Filmography ==
- 2008: The Great British Menu (TV series) – 1 episode: Heston Blumenthal's Dinner at the Gherkin
- 2008: Noma: A Boiling Point / Noma pa Kogepunktet (TV documentary)
- 2009: MasterChef (TV series) – 1 episode: #5.32
- 2010: Three Stars (TV Movie documentary)
- 2010: MasterChef: The Professionals (TV series) – 1 episode: #3.16
- 2010: Noma at Boiling Point (TV Movie documentary)
- 2012: Anthony Bourdain: No Reservations (TV series documentary) – 1 episode: Japan: Cook It Raw
- 2012: The Mind of a Chef (TV series documentary) – 3 episodes: Rene, chef, Buddies
- 2013: La última película (documentary)
- 2014: Finding Gaston (documentary)
- 2015: Noma: My Perfect Storm (documentary)
- 2016: Ants on a Shrimp (documentary)
- 2016: Noma: Australia (TV series documentary) – 3 episodes: #1.1, #1.2, #1.3
- 2018: How to Dine at René Redzepi's new noma (Without a Reservation) (short)
- 2018: Ugly Delicious (TV series documentary) – 3 episodes: Tacos, Homecooking, BBQ
- 2024: Somebody Feed Phil (TV series documentary) – 1 episode: Kyoto
- 2024: The Bear (TV series) - 1 episode: "Tomorrow"
- 2024: Omnivore (TV Series)

== Works and publication ==
=== Books ===
- Redzepi, René; Meyer, Claus; Isager, Ditte (foto) (2007). Henrik Kerrn-Jespersen (ed.). Noma: Nordisk Mad (in Danish). Denmark: Politiken. ISBN 978-87-567-7539-7. OCLC 475466661.
- Redzepi, René; Meyer, Claus; Marmorstein, Dan A. (translated by); Isager, Ditte (photographs by) (2006). Kerrn-Jespersen, Henrik; Seedorff, Christine (eds.). Noma: Nordic Cuisine. Denmark: Politikens Forlag. ISBN 978-87-567-8333-0. OCLC 859381695.
- Redzepi, René; Isager, Ditte (photographs by); Eliasson, Olafur; Skyum-Nielsen, Rune (2010). Noma: Time and Place in Nordic Cuisine. London: Phaidon. ISBN 978-0-7148-5903-3. OCLC 655678787.
- Redzepi, René; Ulrich, Lars (2013). René Redzepi: A Work in Progress. Journal, Recipes and Snapshots. London: Phaidon Press. ISBN 978-0-7148-6691-8. OCLC 858006266.

=== Journals ===
- Redzepi, René; Staszak, Kamilla (2012). "Mój sposób na żurek". Polityka (in Polish). Warszawa: Wydawnictwo Prasowe: 90–91. ISSN 0032-3500. OCLC 1007973573.
- Andelman, David A.; Fredrick, Yaffa; Redzepi, René (2015). "The Passion of Food". World Policy Journal. 32 (3). Durham: Duke University Press: 19–24. doi:10.1177/0740277515605285. ISSN 0740-2775. OCLC 5878738067.

=== Documentaries ===
- Redzepi, René; Vorting, Christian (director) (2008). Noma: A Boiling Point / Noma pa Kogepunktet (film). Copenhagen: Danish Broadcasting Corporation. OCLC 942337686.
- Deschamps, Pierre (director); Deschamps, Etta Thompson (producer); Redzepi, René; Meyer, Claus; Adrià, Ferran (2015). Noma: My Perfect Storm. Los Angeles, California: Magnolia Home Entertainment. OCLC 940513265.
