= Noma (restaurant) =

Restaurant in Copenhagen, Denmark

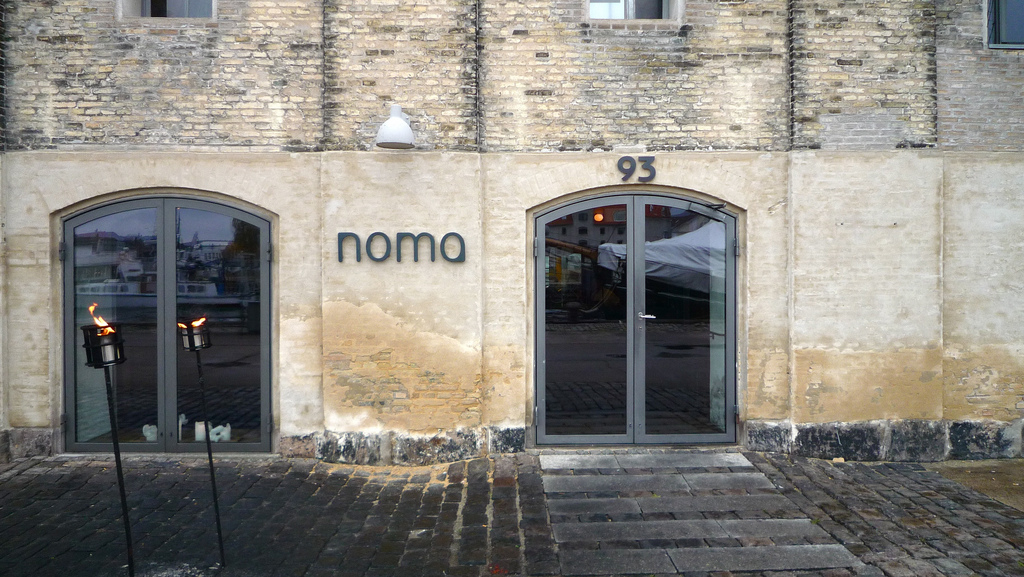
- Entrance of the former location of Noma in Strandgade, Denmark
- Interactive map of Noma

Restaurant information
- Established: 2003 (23 years ago)
- Owner: René Redzepi
- Head chef: René Redzepi
- Food type: New Nordic
- Dress code: None
- Location: Refshalevej 96, Copenhagen, 1432, Denmark
- Coordinates: 55°40′58″N 12°36′38″E
- Website: noma.dk

Noma (Note: styled as noma) (/ˈnoʊ.mə/) is a restaurant and food innovation lab founded by chef René Redzepi and Claus Meyer in Copenhagen, Denmark. The name is a syllabic abbreviation of the two Danish words "nordisk" (Nordic) and "mad" (food). Opened in 2003, the restaurant is known for its focus on foraging, invention and interpretation of New Nordic Cuisine. In 2010, 2011, 2012, 2014, and 2021 it was ranked as the Best Restaurant in the World by Restaurant magazine.

In January 2023, Redzepi announced that Noma would transition away from traditional restaurant service, with its final regular dinner service taking place in Kyoto, Japan, in December 2024. Noma continues to operate as a food lab and through periodic pop-up residencies.

== History ==
Noma's original location was at Strandgade 93, in an old warehouse on the waterfront of the Inner Harbour in the Christianshavn neighbourhood in central Copenhagen.

The building is situated by the Greenlandic Trading Square, which for 200 years was a centre for trade to and from the Faroe Islands, Finnmark, Iceland, and in particular, Greenland. Dry fish, salted herring, whale oil and skins are among the goods that were stored in and around the warehouse before being sold off to European markets.

In 2003, the warehouse was turned into North Atlantic House, a centre for the art and culture of the North Atlantic region. Noma was opened at the same time by René Redzepi and Claus Meyer. The restaurant's interior was designed by Space Copenhagen. Staffers typically wore gray aprons and dark-colored short-sleeved T-shirts.

Between 12 and 16 February 2013, 63 of 435 diners became ill after eating at Noma, according to a Danish Food Administration report. The symptoms were attributed to norovirus, which was believed to have been unintentionally spread by an infected kitchen employee.

Redzepi planned to close Noma after 31 December 2016 and reopen it in 2017 as an urban farm near Copenhagen.

Noma reopened on 15 February 2018 after a year hiatus. The restaurant itself also moved from its previous Strandgade location, now housing Restaurant Barr, to its current location at Refshalevej 96.

In May 2020, during the COVID-19 crisis, Noma re-opened as a wine and burger bar, with takeaway options. It is sometimes referred to as "Noma 3.0" by the food media. Redzepi planned to keep this open for at least a part of the summer 2020.

In January 2023, Redzepi announced that Noma would end traditional restaurant service at the end of 2024, citing the financial and emotional toll of the fine-dining model. The restaurant would instead become a food innovation lab focused on developing new products and techniques, while continuing to host periodic pop-up residencies. Noma's final period of regular dinner service was a 10-week residency in Kyoto, Japan, ending on 18 December 2024.

In March 2026, through interviews of 35 previous employees, The New York Times published an exposé claiming that Redzepi physically abused his subordinates. Redzepi resigned later that month, stating that "an apology is not enough; I take responsibility for my own actions".

== Food ==
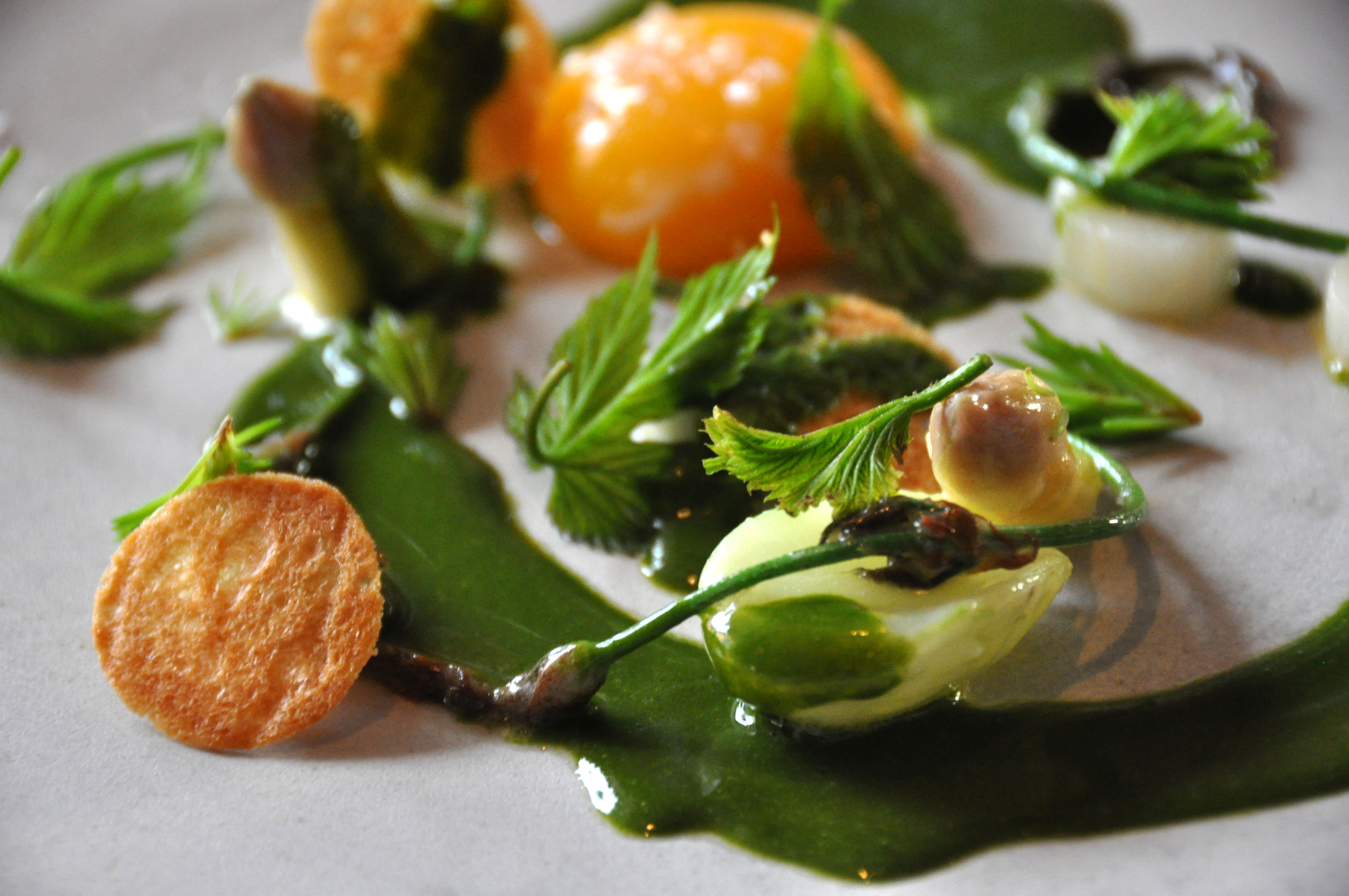
White asparagus with poached egg yolk and sauce of woodruff

The cuisine of Noma is Nordic/Scandinavian; the restaurant's founders, Redzepi and Meyer, have attempted to redefine this Nordic cuisine. Its cuisine can be considered more an interpretation of Nordic food than classical Nordic food itself, according to Meyer in the book Noma – Nordic Cuisine. Notable dishes include "The Hen and the Egg", a meal cooked by the diners themselves, which consists of potato chips, a wild duck egg, slightly wet hay, salt, herbs, wild forest plants, hay oil, thyme, butter, and wild garlic sauce.

== Staff ==
Redzepi formerly worked at restaurants including The French Laundry, El Bulli, Kong Hans Kælder and Le Jardin des Sens. During Noma's final years of regular service, the head chef was Kenneth Foong, who replaced Canadian Benjamin Ing in July 2020. Prior head chefs included Dan Giusti and Matt Orlando.

=== Labor practices ===
Noma historically relied heavily on unpaid interns, known as stagiaires, a common practice in fine dining. A 2022 Financial Times investigation reported that the restaurant employed approximately 30 unpaid interns alongside 34 paid chefs, with interns working up to 70 hours per week. A 2023 Vice report found that roughly half of Noma's 60-person kitchen staff were unpaid.

In October 2022, Noma began paying all of its interns, a change that added an estimated $50,000 to $70,000 per month in labor costs. When Redzepi announced in January 2023 that Noma would transition away from traditional restaurant service, he cited the financial and emotional toll of the model, telling The New York Times: "It's unsustainable. Financially and emotionally, as an employer and as a human being, it just doesn't work."

==== Physical abuse allegations ====
In March 2026, The New York Times reported that Redzepi physically abused dozens of employees at Noma. Thirty employees reported that being hit by Redzepi was "routine." When employees broke rules, Redzepi was known to punch them or publicly ridicule them.

In his statement to The Times, Redzepi said "Although I don’t recognize all details in these stories, I can see enough of my past behavior reflected in them to understand that my actions were harmful to people who worked with me. To those who have suffered under my leadership, my bad judgment, or my anger, I am deeply sorry and I have worked to change."

== Temporary locations ==
From 28 July to 6 August 2012, Noma decamped to London for a 10-day pop-up restaurant hosted by Claridge's hotel in Mayfair, while the restaurant in Copenhagen was closed from 22 July to 13 August for refurbishment. Redzepi, along with head chef Matt Orlando and staff from the restaurant, served up a £195-per-head nine-course menu that included their versions of scones and clotted cream, Lancashire hotpot with British ingredients, as well as live ants foraged in Denmark and flown to London.

On 29 March 2014, Noma announced that the restaurant would be relocating to Japan for two months at the beginning of 2015.

On 24 July 2015, Noma announced that the restaurant would be relocating to Australia for 10 weeks at the beginning of 2016.

On 12 April 2017, Noma Mexico was opened in Tulum, Quintana Roo, Mexico. Noma partnered with Traspatio Maya, a nonprofit network of 15 Maya communities to provide Yucatecan ingredients, such as white Naal Teel corn, Ixil onions, Xtop pepita, bee larva, and Melipona honey from the Calakmul Biosphere Reserve. Products from the rest of the country are also included, such as Baja California wine, Chiapas coffee and Oaxaca artisanal plateware. The pop-up closed on 28 May.

On 13 April 2022, it was announced that a popup Noma would open in Brooklyn, New York, operating from 16–20 May of that year.

In spring 2023, Noma had a 10-week popup in Kyoto, Japan. In May 2024, it was announced that Noma would return to Kyoto from 8 October through 18 December, and that this would be the last dates for restaurant service from Noma.

In July 2025, Redzepi announced that Noma would be coming to Los Angeles for a months-long residency tentatively planned to begin in the spring of 2026. Several years earlier, he had stayed in Manhattan Beach with his family and enjoyed meeting local chefs like Roy Choi and Kris Yenbamroong. His idea for the residency was that "it will be five or six months of energy and trying to meet all the creative people of Los Angeles, and learn from them and be inspired by them".

== Awards ==
=== The World's 50 Best Restaurants, Restaurant ===
- 2006: 33rd Best Restaurant in the World
- 2007: 15th Best Restaurant in the World
- 2008: 10th Best Restaurant in the World
- 2009: 3rd Best Restaurant in the World
- 2009: Chefs' Choice
- 2010: Best Restaurant in the World
- 2011: Best Restaurant in the World
- 2012: Best Restaurant in the World
- 2013: 2nd Best Restaurant in the World
- 2014: Best Restaurant in the World
- 2015: 3rd Best Restaurant in the World
- 2016: 5th Best Restaurant in the World
- 2021: Best Restaurant in the World

=== Other awards ===
- 2008: Lo Mejor de la Gastronomia conference (San Sebastián, Spain), International Chef of the Year
- 2008: TripAdvisor, Best restaurant in the world
- 2008–2020: Michelin Guide – two stars
- 2021–2025: Michelin Guide – three stars

In 2010, the restaurant, as a relative newcomer, startlingly won the Best Restaurant title that El Bulli had held for four consecutive years. This came soon after previous first and second place chefs Ferran Adria and Heston Blumenthal announced that they would be temporarily closing their restaurants. At the time, Noma was viewed as the head of a new movement to spread New Nordic cuisine.

In 2011, with El Bulli having withdrawn from the competition because they would be permanently closing, Noma was named the Best Restaurant for the second year. The restaurant won Best Restaurant without having earned a third Michelin star.

In 2012, Redzepi won the award for Noma yet again, being praised by Restaurant as being "the standard bearer for the New Nordic movement" and winning respect for his attention to detail and innovative approach. His use of local and seasonal ingredients foraged from the seashore and forest was also recognized.

In 2013, Noma was voted the second best restaurant in the world, having lost the first-place position to El Celler de Can Roca in Girona, Catalonia, Spain. In 2014, Noma regained the title.

=== Other recognition ===
The restaurant was featured in Anthony Bourdain: Parts Unknown on 6 October 2013.

== Gallery ==
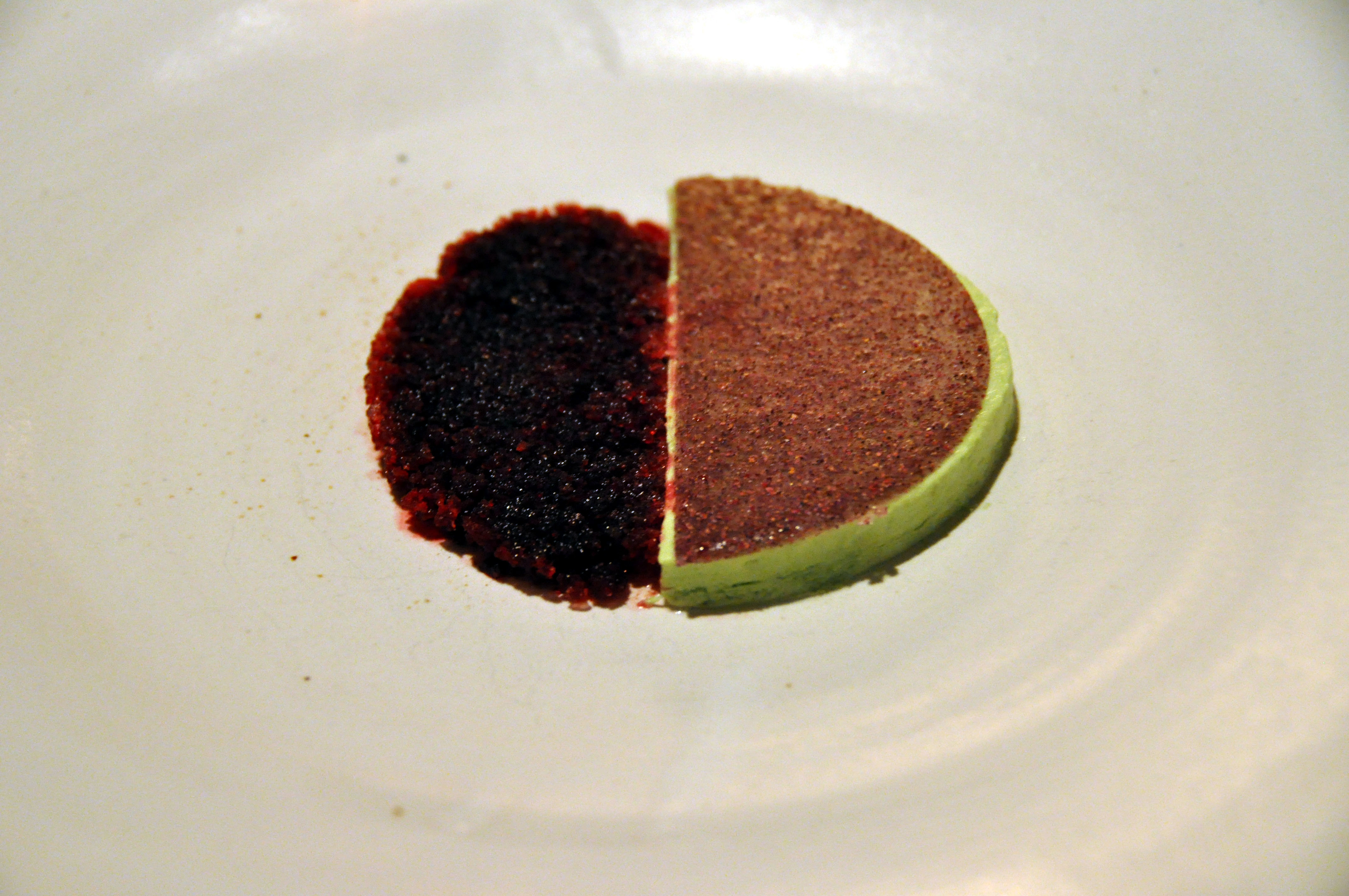
Mousse of sorrel and granita of Rosa rugosa and beetroot

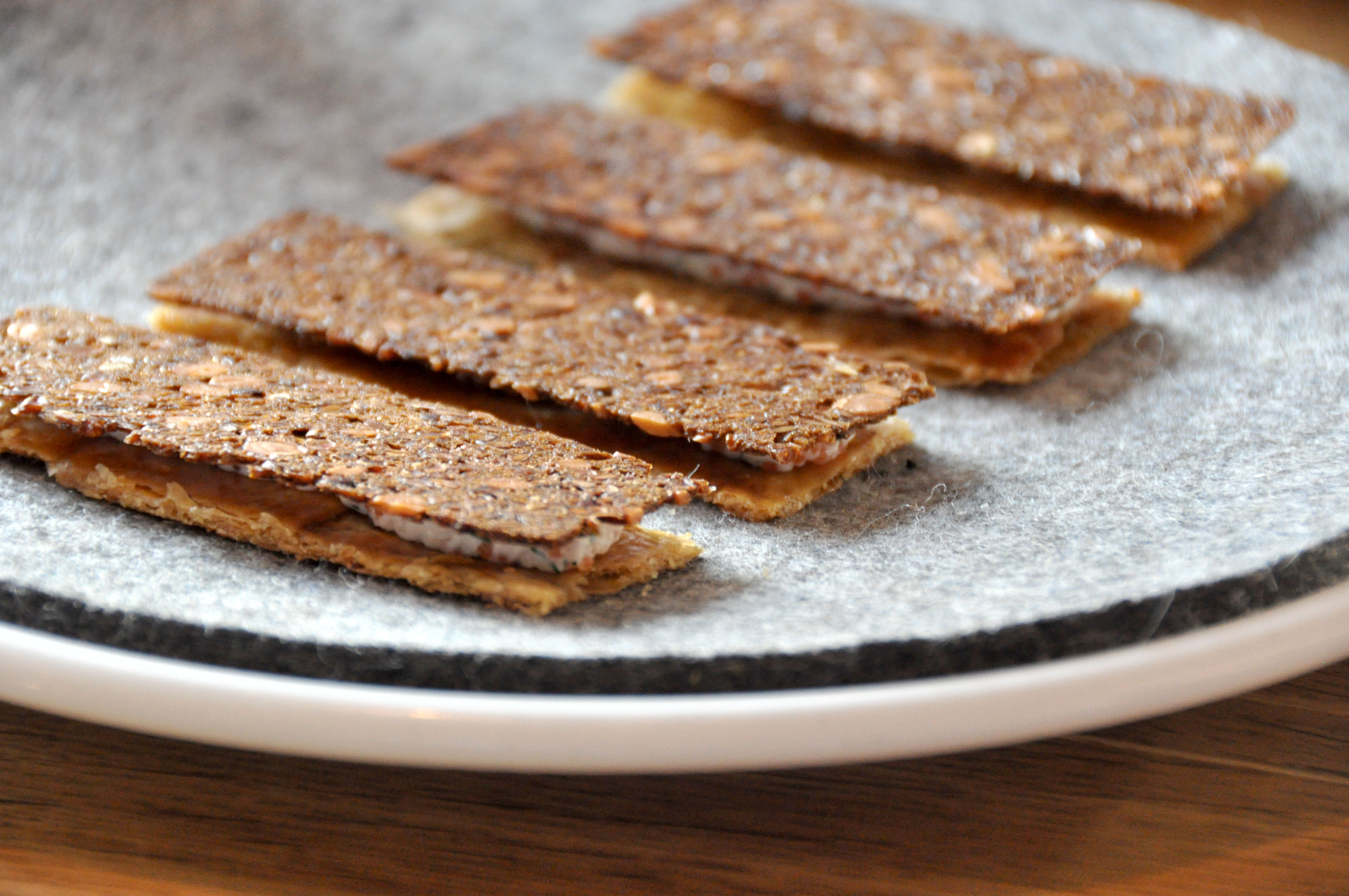
Rye bread and chicken skin with rygeost (Danish smoked cheese) and lumpfish roe

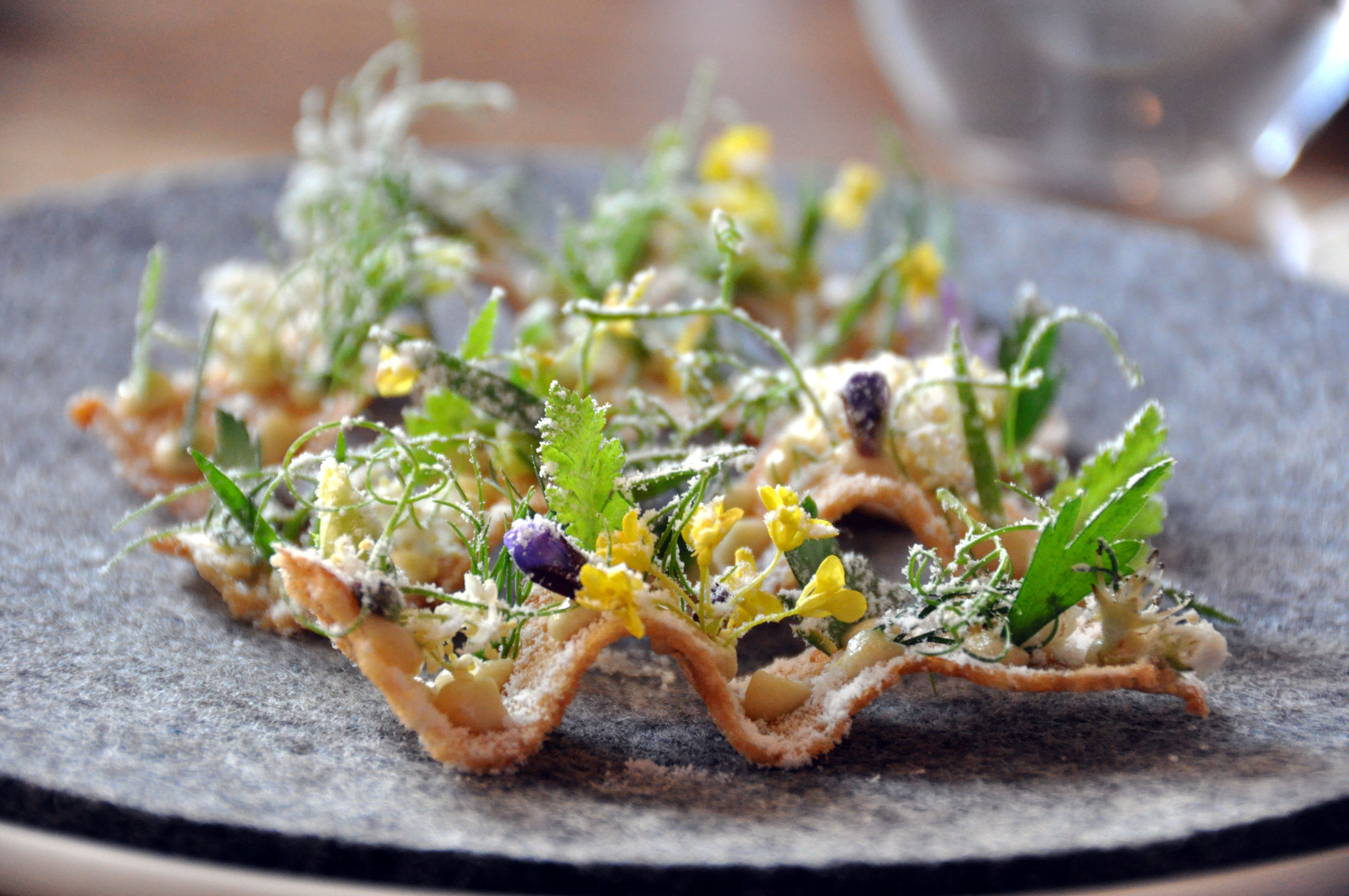
Toast with turbot roe, herbs and vinegar dust

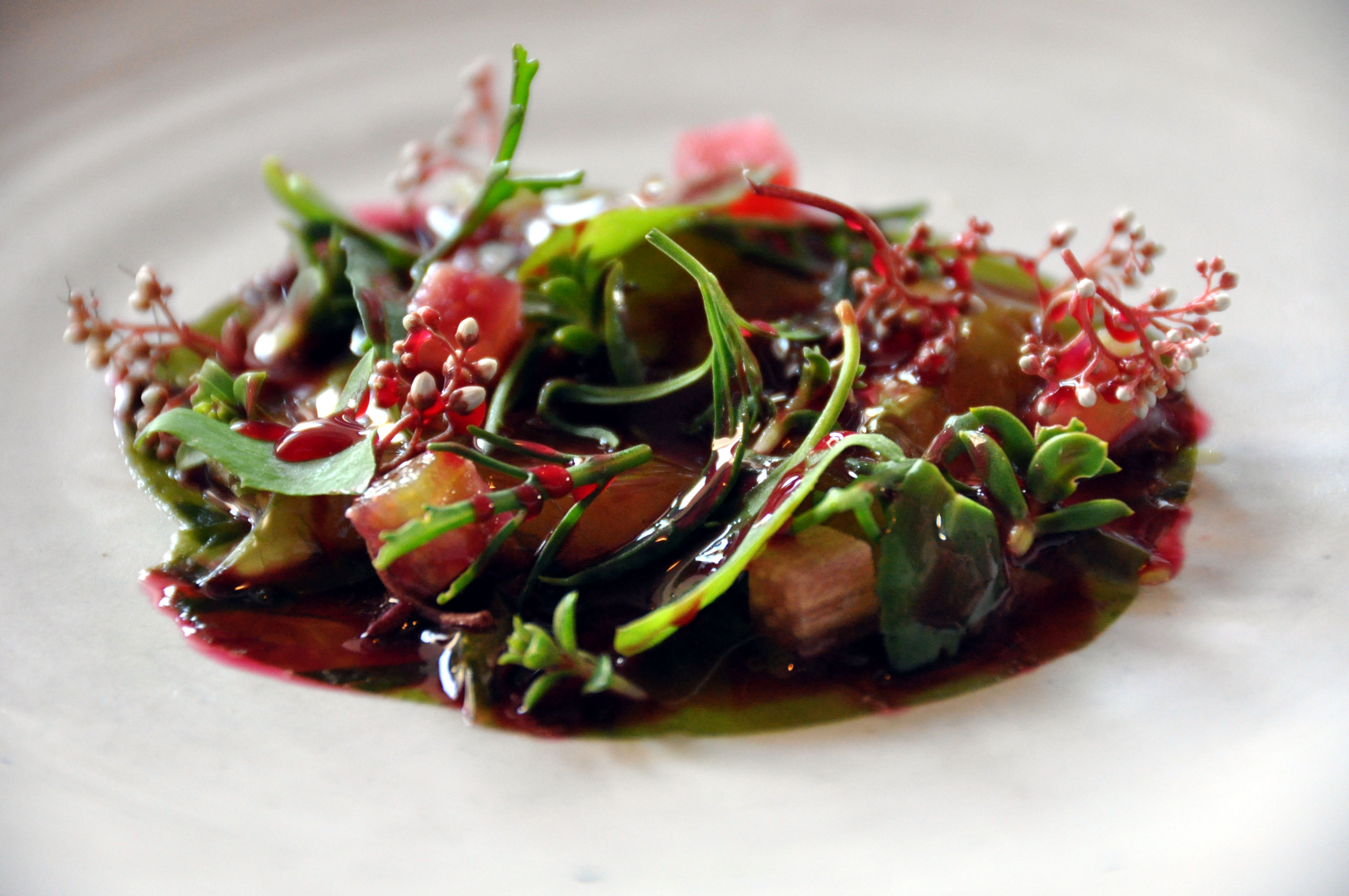
Raw prawns with seaweed, rhubarb and herbs

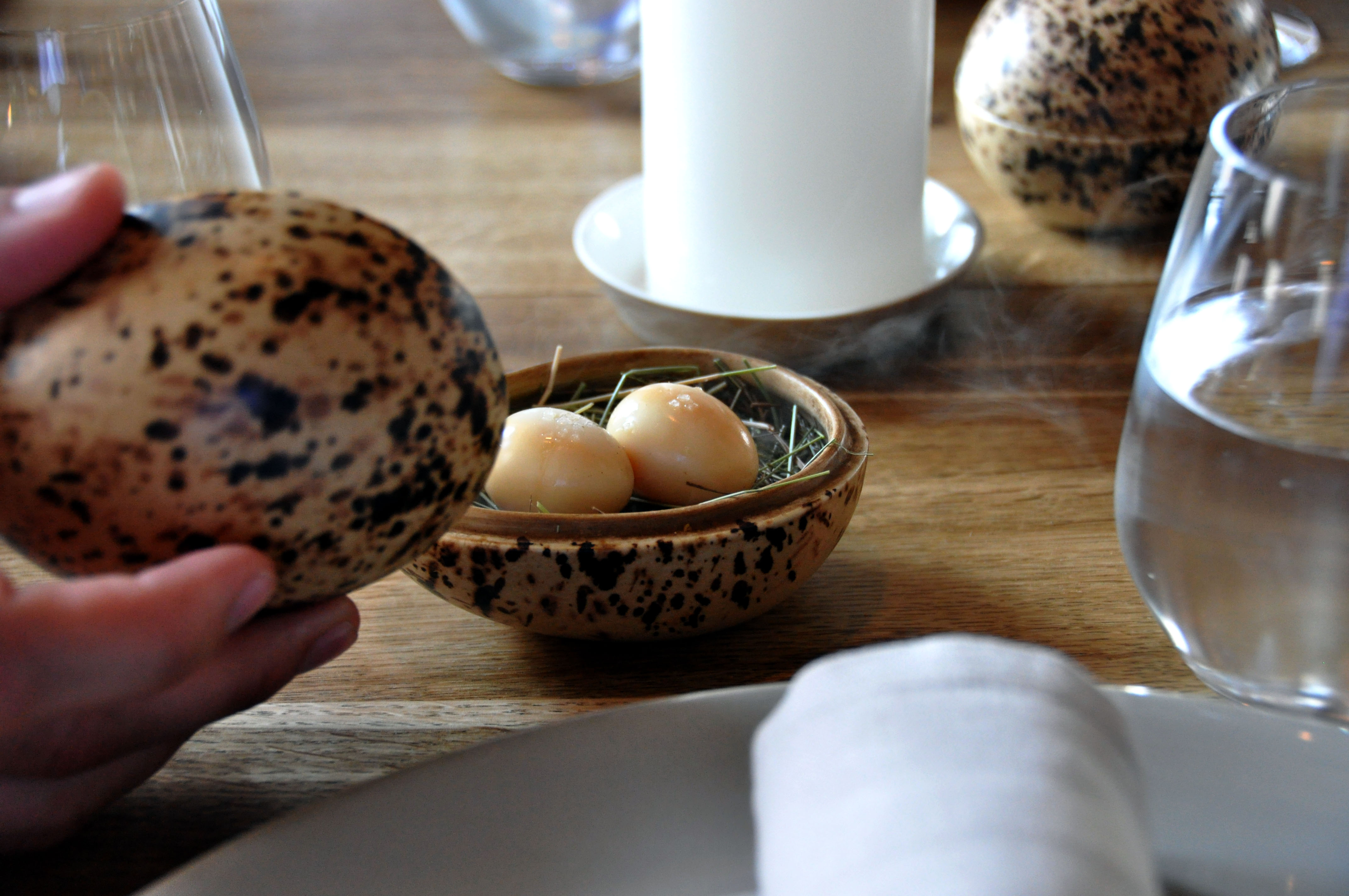
Pickled and smoked quail eggs

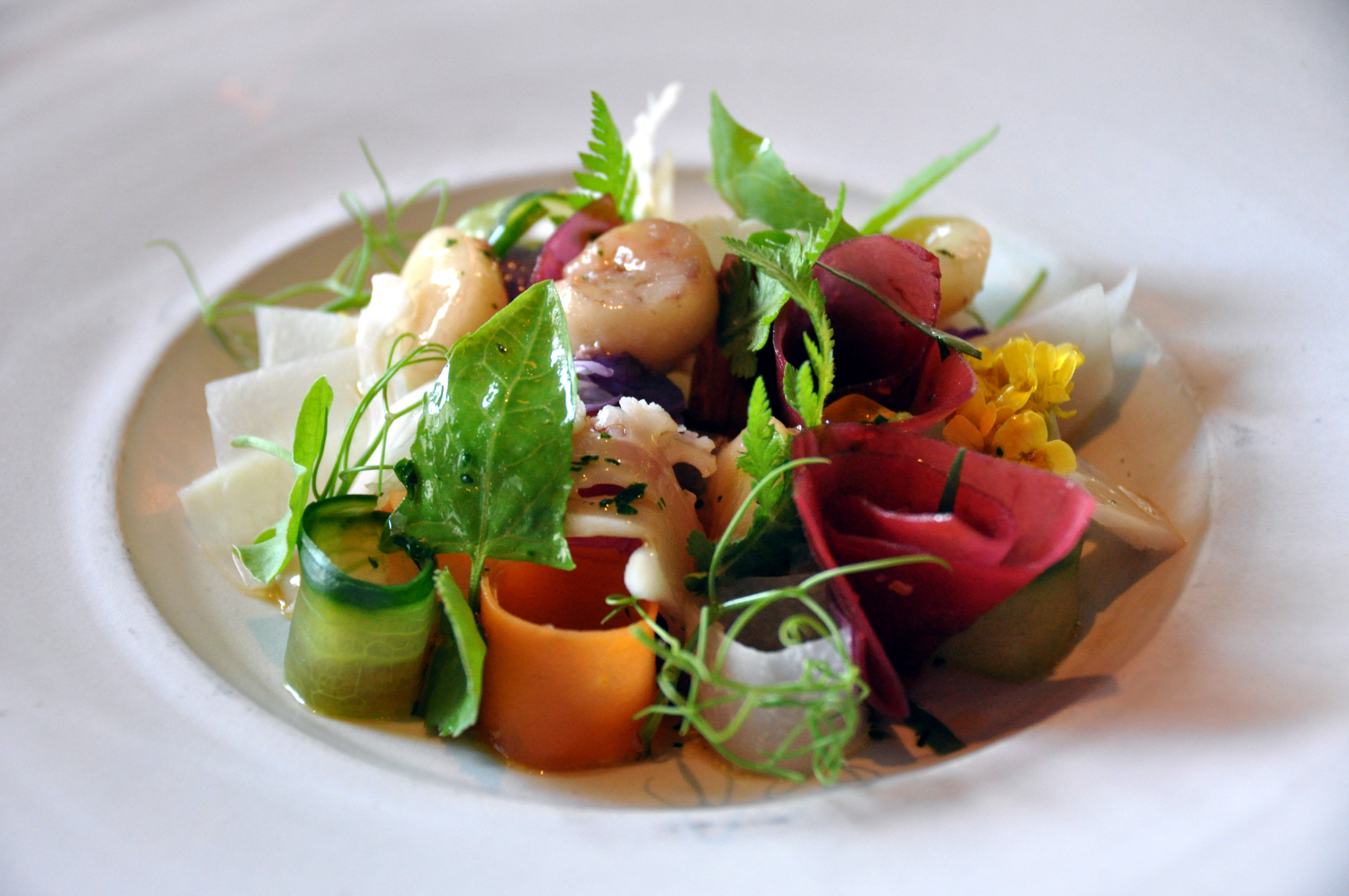
Marrow with pickled vegetables

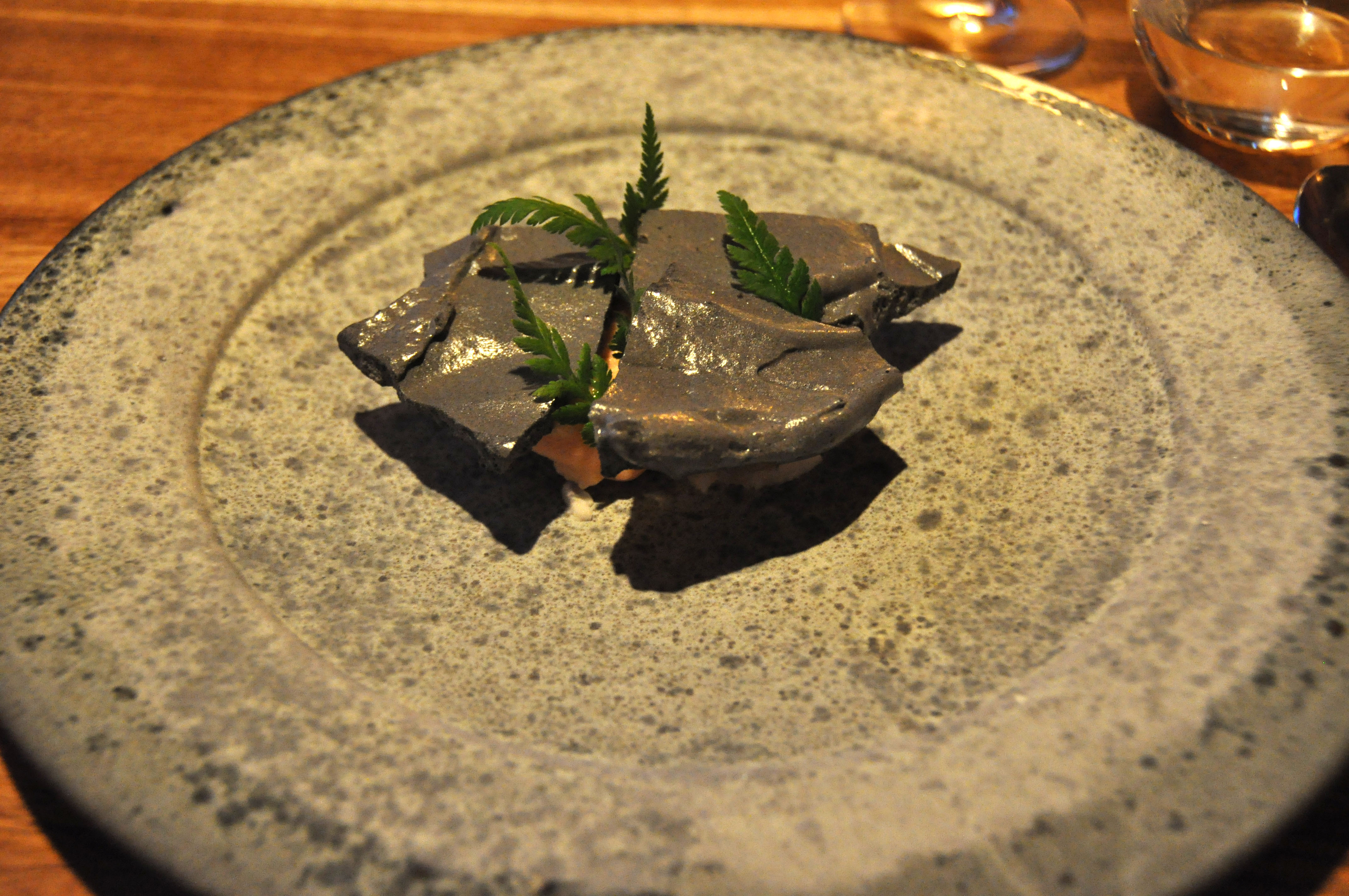
Meringue and ice made with birch and honey

== See also ==
- List of Michelin-starred restaurants in Denmark
