= Niels Lan Doky =

Danish jazz pianist, composer and producer

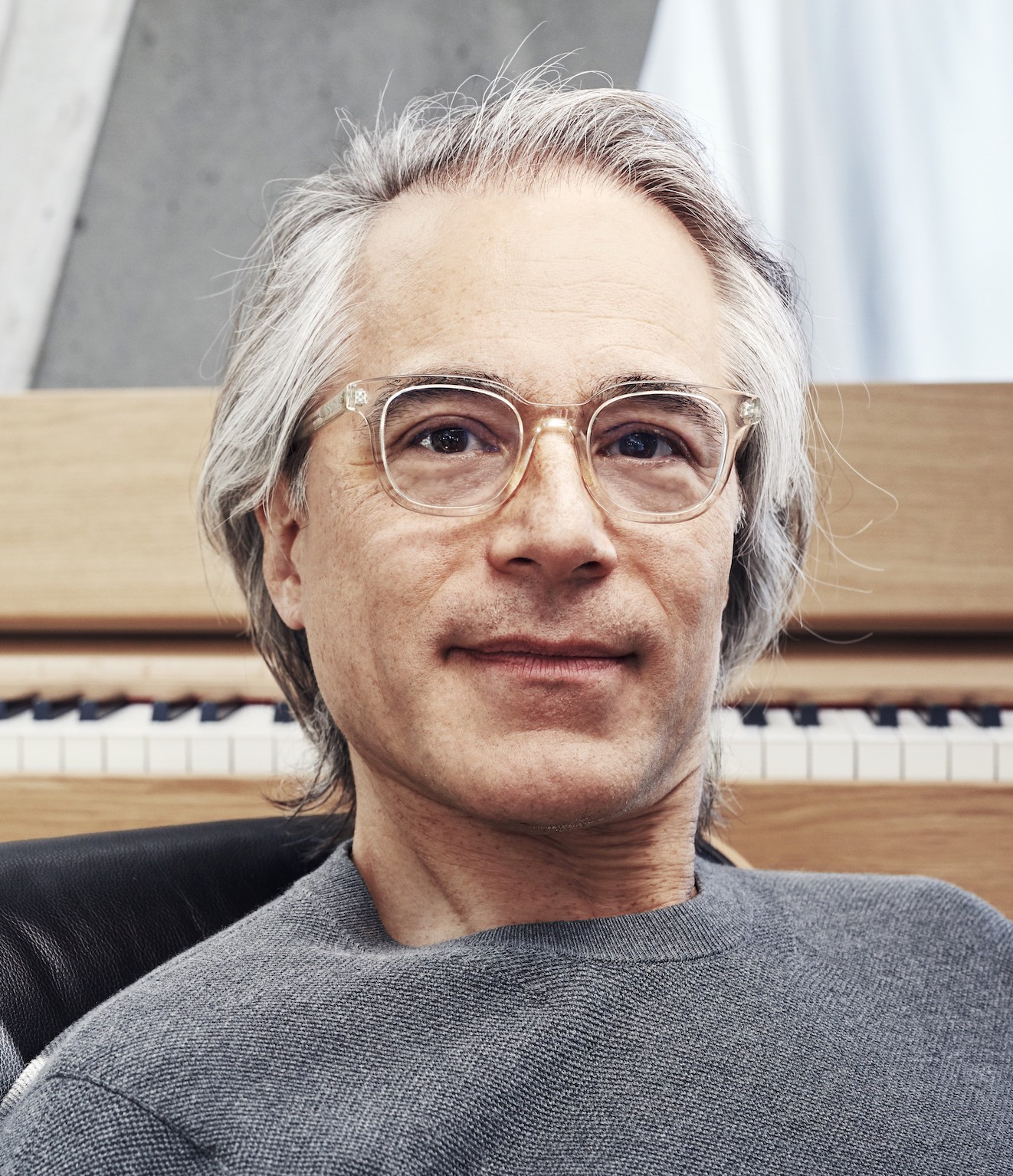

Background information
- Born: 3 October 1963 (age 62); Copenhagen, Denmark
- Origin: Denmark
- Genres: Jazz
- Occupations: Musician, composer
- Instrument: Piano
- Website: www.nielslandoky.com

Niels Lan Doky (born 3 October 1963) is a Danish jazz pianist, composer and producer. He is the older brother of jazz bassist Chris Minh Doky. Niels is engaged to American dancer, actress, and singer Mayte Garcia.

== Biography ==
Doky was born in Copenhagen of a Danish mother and Vietnamese father. His father worked as a doctor, but was also a classically trained guitarist so the guitar was Niels's first instrument. He switched to piano at 11.

He went on to attend the Berklee College of Music in the early 1980s. In his career he has recorded 37 albums as a leader and has a group "The Doky Brothers", which includes his brother Chris Minh Doky on bass guitar. He has also worked with Niels-Henning Ørsted Pedersen, John Scofield, Gino Vannelli, Pat Metheny, Joe Henderson, Mike Brecker, David Sanborn, Ray Brown, Woody Shaw, Charlie Haden, John McLaughlin and many others.

In the wake of a period of his career (various collaborations in the fields of world, pop, classical and electronica, meeting and performing for Pope John Paul II at the Vatican, receiving an award from Denmark's royal family, being appointed Member of the Music Committee under the Danish Arts Council by the Danish Culture Minister, and making his film directing debut with the feature film Between a Smile and a Tear), Lan Doky has in recent years returned to his roots by making it a priority to tour with his jazz trio - which in its US edition comprises drummer Jeff "Tain" Watts and bassist Ira Coleman or Gary Peacock and in its Danish edition comprises bassist Jonathan Bremer and drummer Niclas Bardeleben. He is also a part of The Oscar Peterson Legacy Quartet, a project formed in cooperation with the Oscar Peterson Estate and featuring Peterson alumni Dave Young, Alvin Queen and Ulf Wakenius and Lan Doky.

Lan Doky has released a total of 37 albums on leading jazz labels such as Milestone, Blue Note, Verve, Columbia and Keystone/VideoArtsMusic. His most recent album (2013) is the Warner/Parlophone release Scandinavian Standards. He was knighted by the Queen of Denmark in 2010.

In the liner notes of Lan Doky's 1986 debut album Here or There (Storyville), Dan Morgenstern (Institute of Jazz Studies at Rutgers University, New Jersey, USA) wrote: "There is nothing more encouraging and satisfying than to encounter for the first time a young jazz musician of real stature, someone who can make you feel that the future of the music is in good hands. There cannot be the slightest doubt that Doky's talent is of real significance - that rare thing in the jazz of our time, an original voice in the great tradition."

At the age of 15, Niels Lan Doky began working with Thad Jones and other big names in jazz. "Some of the most inspirational and influential people in my life have been the many expatriate American jazz artists living in Denmark that I had the fortune to meet as I was growing up. Jazz geniuses such as Thad Jones, Ernie Wilkins, Kenny Drew, Ed Thigpen and many more were living and playing around Copenhagen and had an enormous impact on the local music scene."

Denmark's leading jazz artist at the time, the recently deceased bassist NHØP (Niels-Henning Ørsted Pedersen) helped Niels Lan Doky land his first recording contract with Storyville records in 1986 and toured and recorded with him across Europe and in the USA during the rest the decade and well into the 1990s. NHØP became a mentor for Niels Lan Doky and played a crucial role in helping him find his own musical voice and develop his own personal style.

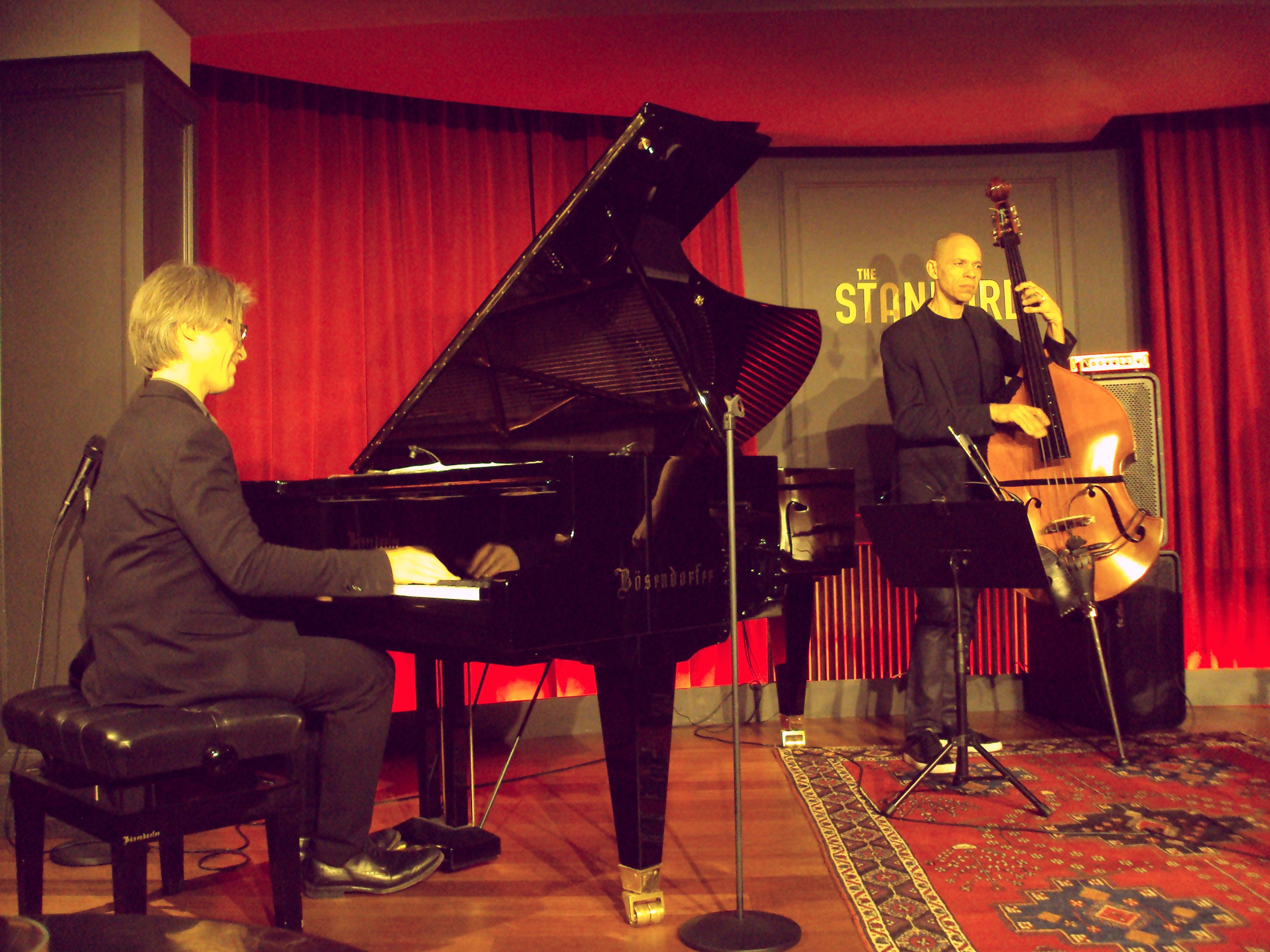
Lan Doky and Ira Coleman at the Standard in Copenhagen (2014)

Shortly after finishing high school in 1981, Lan Doky followed the advice of Thad Jones and moved to the USA where he (after first studying at Berklee College of Music in Boston) went on to establish himself in New York performing with the elite of the American jazz scene (Joe Henderson, Gary Peacock, Jack DeJohnette, Ray Brown, Randy and Michael Brecker, David Sanborn, Al Foster, Billy Hart, John Scofield, John Abercrombie, Bill Evans, Bob Berg, Tom Harrell, Ray Drummond, Al Jarreau, Charlie Haden, Gino Vannelli, etc.) in addition to leading groups under his own name in New York jazz clubs such as the Village Vanguard, the Blue Note and Sweet Basil. In recent years, Lan Doky has been based out of Paris - which by many is considered to be the jazz centre of Europe. But he spends most of his time in Copenhagen, where he has co-founded two very high-profile jazz clubs, most recently The Standard in Copenhagen (2013) and before that the re-opening of Jazzhus Montmartre (2010).

"Niels Lan Doky has proven to become one of the most convincing disciples of Bill Evans. Without forgetting a very personal romantic sensibility, Niels has also assimilated the history of jazz piano, by going back to at least Art Tatum, instead of stopping, as many do, at Hancock and Jarrett, to explore the post-Evans era. Melodic player with a deep and enlightening touch" - Michel Contat (Télérama, France).

=== Films ===
Between a Smile and a Tear is a film that portrays a number of musicians' relationships to music, life and the Montmartre era including two concerts at a temporarily resurrected jazz club Montmartre (Copenhagen) in the summer of 2004. Contributing and performing in the documentary besides Niels Lan Doky was Danish bassist Mads Vinding, American drummer Albert "Tootie" Heath, harmonica player Toots Thielemans, Johnny Griffin (tenor sax), Didier Lockwood (violin) and Lisa Nilsson (vocal).

Lan Doky is working on his next feature-length jazz documentary film Dreaming with Open Eyes, featuring David Sanborn (alto sax), Randy Brecker (trumpet), Terri Lyne Carrington (drums), Gino Vannelli and Lisa Nilsson (vocals).

== Discography ==
Year recorded	Title	Label	Notes
1986	Here or There	Storyville	Trio, with Niels-Henning Ørsted Pedersen (bass), Alvin Queen (drums)
1986	The Target	Storyville	Trio, with Niels-Henning Ørsted Pedersen (bass), Jack DeJohnette (drums)
1987	The Truth	Storyville	Quartet, with Bob Berg (tenor sax), Bo Stief (bass), Terri Lyne Carrington (drums); in concert
1989	Daybreak	Storyville	Quartet, with John Scofield (guitar), Niels-Henning Ørsted Pedersen (bass), Terri Lyne Carrington (drums)
1990	Close Encounter	Storyville	Trio, with Gary Peacock (bass), Alex Riel (drums)
1991	The Toronto Concert	Maracatu	with Chris Minh Doky (bass), John Abercrombie (guitar), Adam Nussbaum (drums); in concert
1993	Manhattan Portrait		
1993	Paris by Night	Soul Note	Quartet, with Randy Brecker (trumpet), Chris Minh Doky (bass), Daniel Humair (drums); in concert
1996	Doky Brothers		
1997	Doky Brothers, Vol. 2	Blue Note/Medley Records/EMI	featuring Gino Vannelli, Dianne Reeves, Al Jarreau, Randy Brecker, Toots Thielemans
1999	Asian Sessions	EmArcy	featuring Thanh Lan
2001	Haitek Haiku	EmArcy	featuring Gino Vannelli
2003	Spain		
2010	Return to Denmark	BRO Recordings	
2011	Human Behaviour	BRO Recordings	
2017	Improvisation on Life		
2020	River of Time		
2023	Modern Standards		

Main source:
