= Chris Minh Doky =

Danish jazz bassist (born 1969)

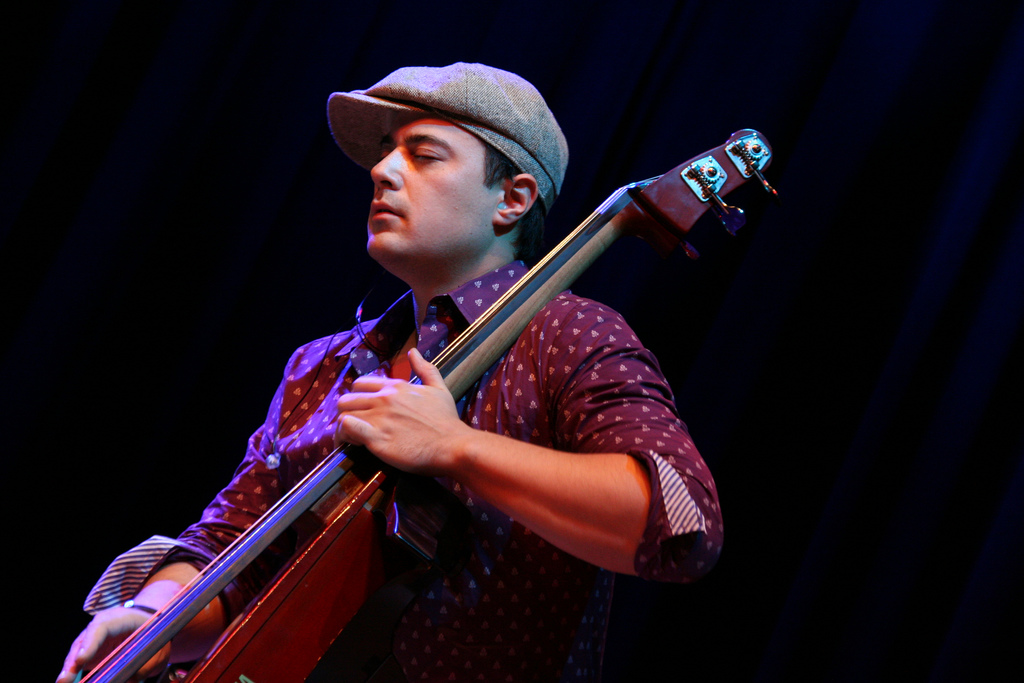
- Chris Minh Doky live at Dudelange 2008

Background information
- Born: 7 February 1969 (age 57); Copenhagen, Denmark
- Genre: Jazz
- Occupations: Musician, composer, record producer
- Instruments: Double bass, bass guitar
- Years active: 1989–present
- Website: doky.com

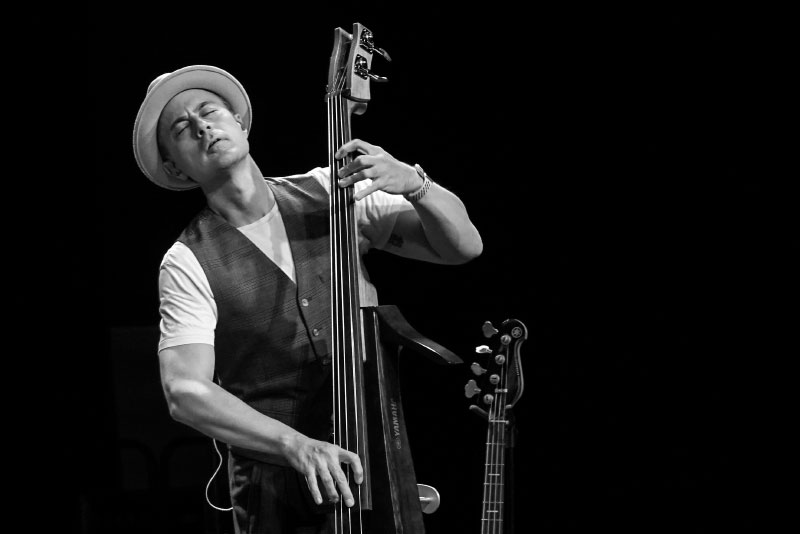
Chris Minh Doky in Aarhus, Denmark 2020

Chris Minh Doky (born 7 February 1969) is a Danish jazz bassist. He is the younger brother of jazz pianist Niels Lan Doky. He released his first album, Appreciation, in 1989 four years after picking up the instrument.

As a sideman, he has collaborated with Mike Stern, Michael Brecker, Trilok Gurtu, Ryuichi Sakamoto, and David Sanborn.

His sound is often described as a blend of his native Scandinavian tradition with the feel of his adopted homeland, the United States. He was married to Tanja, a lady-in-waiting to Denmark's Crown Princess Mary, but they divorced in 2014.

== Discography ==
- Appreciation (Storyville, 1989)
- The Sequel (Storyville, 1990)
- Letters (Storyville, 1991)
- The Toronto Concert (Maracatu, 1992) with Niels Lan Doky, John Abercrombie, Adam Nussbaum
- Paris by Night (Soul Note, 1993)
- Live in Marciac (Dreyfus, 1994)
- Blue Eyes (Dreyfus, 1998)
- Minh (EMI, 1998)
- Listen Up! (Virgin, 2000)
- Cinematique (Blue Note/Capitol, 2002)
- The Nomad Diaries (Blue Note, 2006)
- Scenes from a Dream (Red Dot, 2010)
- New Nordic Jazz (Red Dot, 2015)
- Transparency (Red Dot, 2018)
