= Ants on a Shrimp =

- Directed by: Maurice Dekkers
- Release date: 2016
- Running time: 88 minutes

Ants on a Shrimp is a 2016 documentary film directed by Maurice Dekkers about chef René Redzepi's journey to create a temporary restaurant in Tokyo.

The team only had one month to get ready for the five week event in Mandarin Oriental, Tokyo. During this, they create a 14-course menu from local ingredients. Redzepi himself only arrives in Japan 15 days before opening to see what his team has come up with.

== Reception ==
Eater said "To see this in action isn’t quite as good as eating at Noma, but it’s the closest we’ll probably ever get."
