= Gustu =

- Interactive map of Gustu

Restaurant information
- Established: 2012
- Previous owner: Claus Meyer
- Head chef: Jairo Michel and Kenzo Hirose Marsia Taha (2012-2024)
- Food type: Modern Bolivian cuisine
- Dress code: None
- Rating: 38 in Latin America's 50 Best Restaurants
- Location: 300, Calle 10 Calacoto, La Paz, Bolivia
- Coordinates: 16.544506°S 68.086482°W
- Reservations: Yes
- Website: www.gustu.bo

Gustu is a restaurant and bar in La Paz, Bolivia. Its name comes from the Quechua word for 'flavour'. It was founded by Claus Meyer and opened in April 2012 under head chef Marsia Taha. It is considered among South America's 50 best restaurants.

== History ==
Gustu opened its doors in April 2012 and soon was noticed by major international newspapers and magazines along with its founder Claus Meyer. Most noteworthy are appearances in The New York Times, The Guardian, the Financial Times, Food and Wine, Bloomberg, Eater and CNN.

Being part of Melting Pot Bolivia, an NGO endeavor by Meyer in cooperation with IBIS Denmark, Gustu's mission is both restaurant and cooking school. After they both experienced success, Gustu departed from Melting Pot Bolivia and IBIS Denmark.

Melting Pot Bolivia and Gustu were the subject of the 2019 film A Taste of Sky, directed by Michael Lei.

In October 2024, Marsia Taha resigned her position as head chef to open her first restaurant. Chefs Jairo Michel and Kenzo Hirose are now managing Gustu.

== Philosophy ==
The restaurant's motto and founding philosophy is: "We believe we can change the world through food." Meyer implemented this ethos when he introduced the "Manifesto of the New Bolivian Cuisine". Most of the students at Gustu are underprivileged Bolivian youngsters.

The restaurant also applies a "kilometer 0" philosophy, meaning that all products used in their dishes and drinks are exclusively born, planted, developed, and transformed in Bolivia.

== Recognition ==
In 2013, Gustu won Best New Restaurant in South America and Best Restaurant in South America, from "Como Sur – South American Gastronomy".

In 2014, it placed 32nd on Latin America's 50 Best Restaurants in Restaurant Magazine, and won the S. Pellegrino Best Restaurant award in Bolivia. It again won Best Restaurant in South America from Como Sur – South American Gastronomy, and Kamilla Seidler again won the award for Best Chef in South America.

In 2015, it climbed 15 spots on Latin America's 50 Best Restaurants and ranked 17th.

In 2017, it ranked 14th by British magazine Restaurant.

In 2024, Gustu was ranked 38th on Latin America's 50 Best Restaurants.

== See also ==
- Agriculture in Bolivia
- Bolivian wine
