= Claus Meyer =

Danish cook & television host (born 1962)

- Born: Claus Meyer Nielsen; 27 December 1963 (age 61); Nykøbing Falster, Denmark
- Education: Copenhagen Business School
- Occupations: Entrepreneur, cook, television host, restaurateur
- Spouse: Christina Meyer Bengtsson
- Children: 3
- Awards: Order of the Dannebrog

Claus Meyer (born 27 December 1963) is a Danish entrepreneur, cook and television host. He is often accredited as the founder of the New Nordic Cuisine philosophy.

== Projects ==
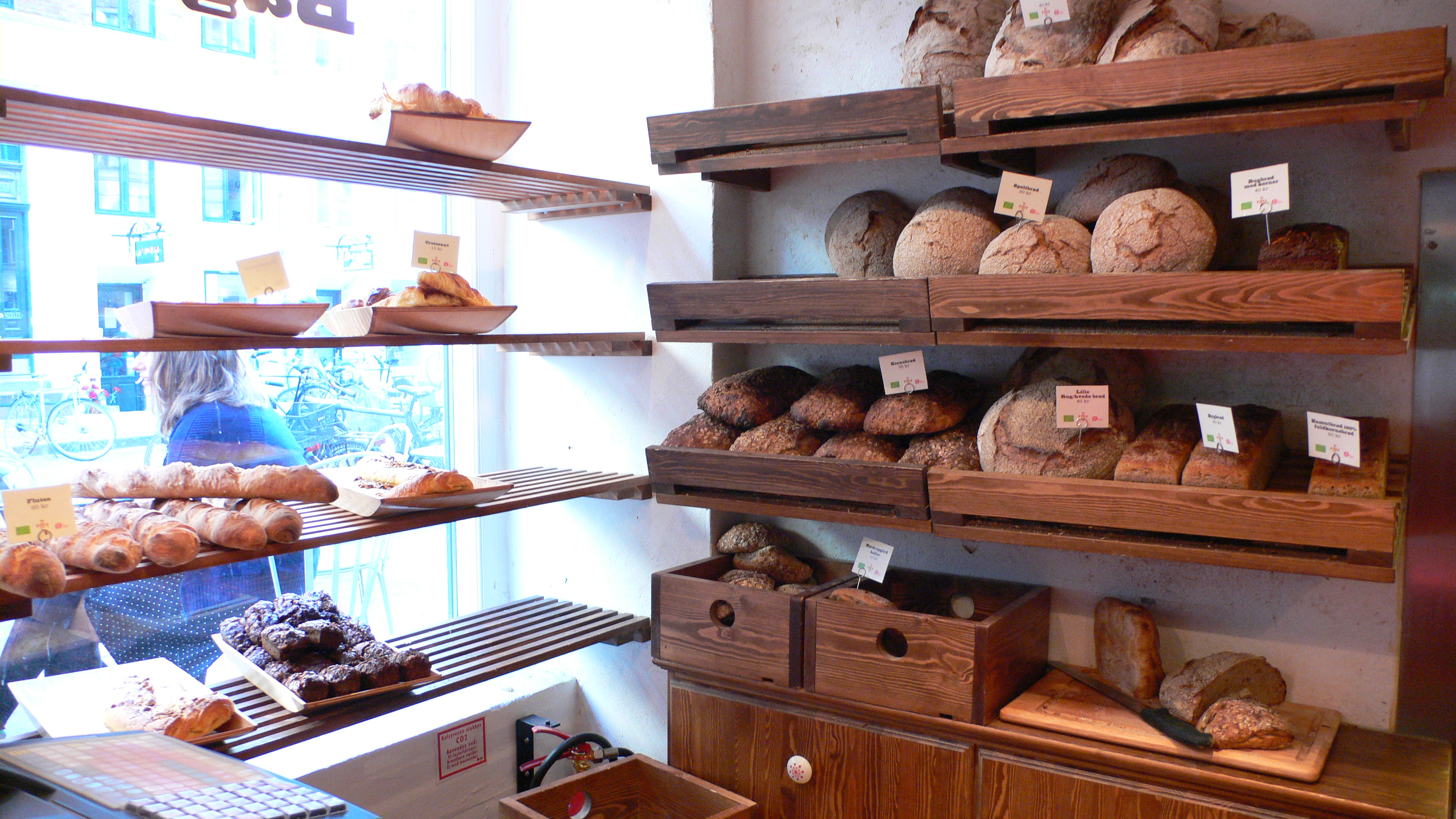
Claus Meyers Bakery

Claus Meyer has been engaged in a plethora of projects and has been a popular mediator of food culture in both Denmark and internationally for many years. Meyer is often accredited as the sole founder of the New Nordic Cuisine philosophy, but regardless of his obvious and groundbreaking contribution, mediation and writing on the subject, other people have also contributed to the philosophy and materialised it in practice. A total of twelve chefs from the Nordic countries wrote a New Nordic Food Manifesto in 2004 to initiate the movement, based on Claus Meyer's initiative, inspirational draft, and coordination. The New Nordic Cuisine Movement seeks to foster local agriculture, honor the region's agrarian traditions, encourage environmentally friendly production, and establish food with a uniquely Nordic identity among the world's great cuisines. Meyer and chef René Redzepi co-founded the groundbreaking restaurant Noma, an acronym for "Nordisk Mad" (Nordic Food), as a working laboratory and kitchen to foster and realize the theoretical ideas of the New Nordic Cuisine Movement. Noma has been awarded three Michelin stars and was voted best restaurant in the world in 2010, 2011, 2012, 2014 and 2021.

Meyer has hosted several Danish and international TV cooking shows, including Meyers Køkken (Meyer's Kitchen) on national Danish television (DR1) from 1991 to 1998 and New Scandinavian Cooking, broadcast in more than 130 countries.

In June 2016, Meyer opened Great Northern Food Hall and Agern restaurant, both in the Vanderbilt Hall of Grand Central Terminal, New York, bringing culinary concepts, flavors and ideas from the Nordic countries to New York, but with many local ingredients in line with the New Nordic philosophy. The chef at Agern was Gunnar Karl Gíslason, formerly of Dill, in Reykjavík, Iceland; Agern and Dill were both awarded Michelin stars in the 2017 Red Guide. Christina Meyer Bengtson, Claus' wife, designed the food hall and the restaurant in collaboration with fellow Danish designer Ulrik Nordentoft, inspired by the oak motif, Danish design and traditional Scandinavian knitting patterns. Bengtson and Nordentoft have designed many other projects of Claus Meyer. Agern permanently closed in 2021 following a long period of closure during the COVID-19 pandemic.

== Melting Pot Foundation ==
Meyer has founded several organisations, including the Melting Pot Foundation, focused on driving social change through food. With Melting Pot, in 2013, he started and helped establish a food school and a food movement in South America, opening the gourmet-restaurant Gustu in Bolivia and several cafeterias. The Melting Pot project is currently working on a social project in Brownsville, East New York, establishing a culinary school, cafeteria, bakery, and community center, serving the local community and with the goal of engaging at-risk youth.

Believing in food as a driver for social change, Meyer established the Melting Pot Foundation in 2010. The organization runs several projects across the globe, including a cooking school project in Danish prisons, motivating incarcerated people to live a life without crime. In 2013, Melting Pot established a cooking school in La Paz, Bolivia, providing culinary education to impoverished Bolivians, also serving as a gourmet restaurant, Gustu, voted 17th best in Latin America on the Latin America's 50 Best Restaurants list.

== Professional background ==
Meyer is an associate professor in the Department of Food Science at the University of Copenhagen. as well as an adjunct professor at the Institute for Corporate Social Responsibility at the Copenhagen Business School. In 2015 he was appointed "Social Impact Fellow" at the Haas School of Business, University of California, Berkeley. Meyer also holds an MA in international business studies from the Copenhagen Business School.

Meyer is a restaurateur and culinary entrepreneur. He has also written and published numerous cookbooks. Meyer co-owns several restaurants and enterprises, such as The Standard in Copenhagen, which include the New Nordic restaurant Almanak, as well as a chain of bakeries, delis, a catering business, an orchard, fruit and chocolate supply companies, a vinegar factory, a coffee roastery, and a cooking school for children and adults.

== Personal life ==
Meyer is married to the graphic designer Christina Meyer Bengtsson. They have three daughters.

In 2014, Meyer and his family relocated to New York City with the purpose of establishing a food hall and restaurant rooted in the New Nordic Cooking philosophy to be located at Grand Central Terminal.
