= Copenhagen Hospitality College =

Vocational college in Copenhagen, Denmark

Coordinates: 55.6629°N 12.5217°E

- Hotel og Restaurantskolen
- Type: Public
- Established: 1922
- President: Anne-Birgitte Agger
- Administrative staff: 167
- Students: 6,000
- Location: Copenhagen, Denmark
- Website: www.hrs.dk

Copenhagen Hospitality College (Danish: Hotel og Restaurantskolen, abbr. HRS) is a vocational college located in Copenhagen, Denmark. The school is Northern Europe's largest school specialising in hospitality courses and Denmark's largest food institute.

== History ==
Around 1920 some restaurateurs decided to come together to offer educational evening classes in various subjects relative to the hospitality industry, these classes took place on board a schooner named Constance.

As teachings became more and more comprehensive, the Ministry of Education acknowledged that subjects related to the hospitality industry were a professional craft and the school was approved apprenticeship status in 1922 and became known as the Restaurant Industry Apprenticeship School.

As enrollment to the newly established school increased, there quickly became a shortage of space aboard the schooner. The school moved in 1924 into a building of Copenhagen Institute of Technology (Now part of Aalborg University) and later to Kongedybet on Amager.

In 1980 the school changed its name to its current title Hotel og Restaurantskolen/Copenhagen Hospitality College and relocated to bigger premises in the meatpacking district of down town Copenhagen - Kødbyen.

During the 1990s the student body increased dramatically, leading the school to begin a search for additional premises. In January 2004 the school finally found an additional campus on Neils Hemmingsensgade, central Copenhagen. Kødbyen then became responsible mostly for the culinary arts students and Neils Hemmingsensgade became the centre for administration and hospitality studies.

HRS finally got its wish to be reunited on one campus in August 2010 with a move into the newly vacated Aller Press building on Vigerslev Allé in the neighbourhood of Valby.

Some of its programmes were transferred under the administration of Copenhagen Business Academy in August 2012.
