= New Nordic Cuisine =

Culinary movement

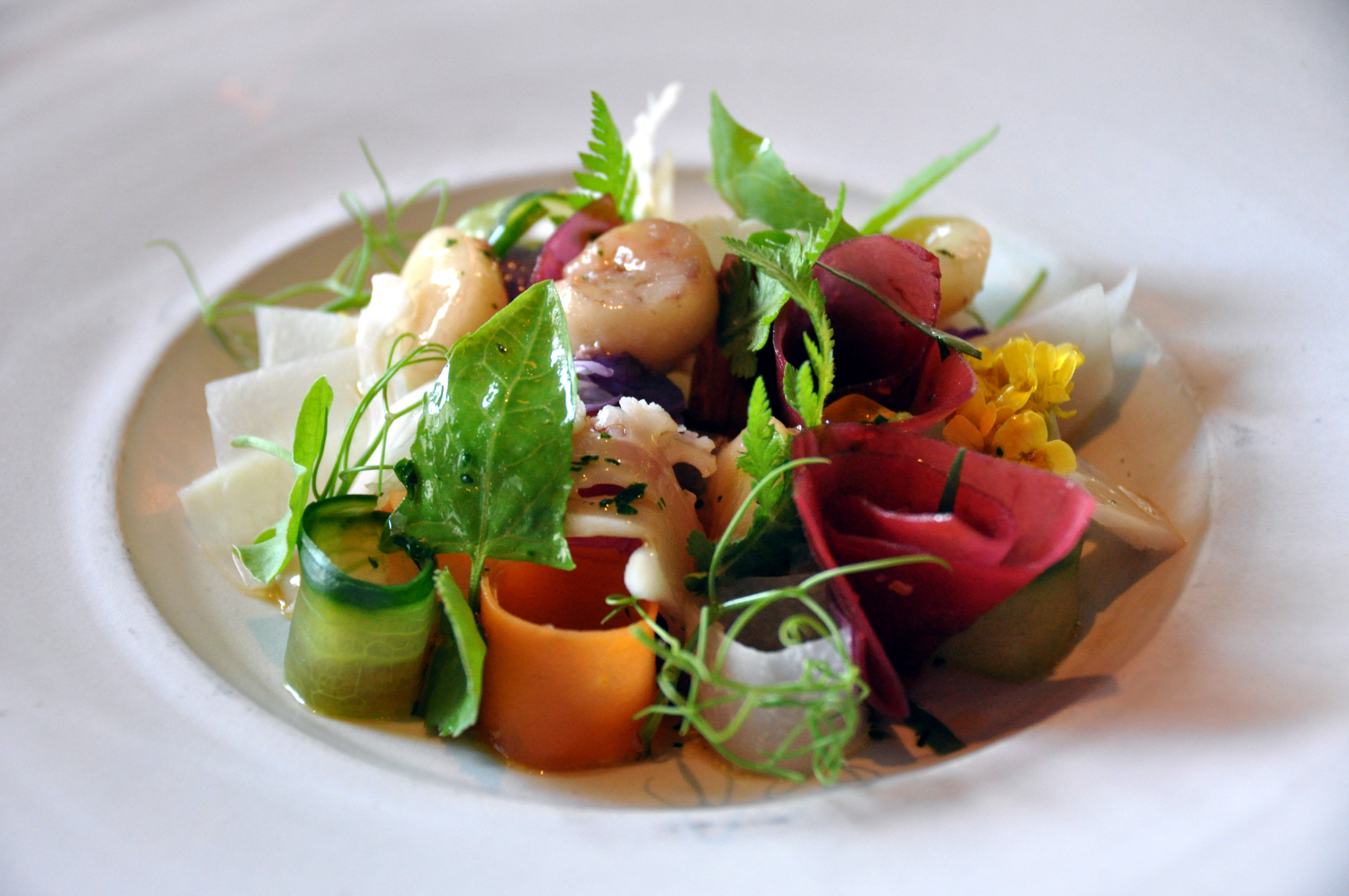
New Nordic dish with local, seasonal ingredients. Marrow with pickled vegetables at Restaurant Noma.

New Nordic Cuisine (Danish: Det nye nordiske køkken, Swedish: Det nya nordiska köket, Norwegian: Det nye nordiske kjøkken, Finnish: Uusi pohjoismainen keittiö, Icelandic: Nýnorræn matargerð, Faroese: Nýggi norðurlendski køkurin) is a culinary movement which has been developed in the Nordic countries, and Scandinavia in particular, since the mid-2000s. New Nordic Cuisine was propelled and inspired by new ideas introduced in a manifesto written by food activist and entrepreneur Claus Meyer and a number of Scandinavian chefs in 2004 in Copenhagen. New Nordic Cuisine has been used to promote local, natural and seasonal produce as a foundation for new dishes both at restaurants and in the home. As a result, a number of restaurants, particularly restaurants in Denmark, have introduced local ingredients, some often new to the usual palate, in combination with traditional foods prepared in new ways. One notable chef who helped popularize New Nordic cuisine is René Redzepi, the former head chef of Noma.

== History ==
In November 2004, on the initiative of the Danish chefs René Redzepi and Claus Meyer of the then newly opened Noma restaurant, chefs and food professionals from all the Nordic countries met in Copenhagen to discuss how best to develop what they called the "New Nordic Cuisine". In particular, they sought to emphasize the need for what they described as "purity, simplicity and freshness" as well as increased use of seasonal foods. Restaurants were encouraged to develop traditional dishes making use of ingredients benefitting from the local region's climate, water and soil.

Meeting in Copenhagen in 2005, the Nordic Council's agricultural and food ministers from Denmark, Finland, Iceland, Norway, Sweden and dependent territories gave their support to these developments, launching what they called the "new Nordic Food Programme". In 2006, this led to the funding of EUR 3 million for a number of related activities.

New Nordic cuisine is gaining traction in Minnesota, particularly in the Twin Cities.

== Approach ==
The evolving cuisine has sought to take advantage of the possibilities inherent in traditional Scandinavian recipes for seafood and meat dishes, building on the utilization of local products whilst reviving and adapting on some of the older techniques, for example, those for marinating, smoking and salting. Products such as rapeseed, oats, cheeses and older varieties of apples and pears are now being prepared with greater attention to safeguarding their natural flavours. These steps have been taken by the proponents of the New Nordic Cuisine in parallel with their awareness of a growing interest in organic foods throughout the region. In addition to concerns for "purity and freshness", they have also aimed to make maximum use of seasonal produce such as new potatoes, strawberries and asparagus in the summer and baked goods and seasoned meats during the Christmas period.

Claus Meyer has supported the campaign, not only in restaurants but also for food production in the Nordic region. The Swedish chef Magnus Nilsson has also pioneered the New Nordic Cuisine, and his approach also includes the documentation and reviving of traditional cooking from across the Nordic region altogether.

== Restaurants ==
Since its opening, Copenhagen's Noma restaurant (short for nordisk mad meaning 'Nordic food') has been a flagship for and at the forefront of developing and materializing the ideas behind the New Nordic Cuisine. Aiming to serve dishes prepared under guidelines drawn up for the new cuisine it was repeatedly awarded the title of "world's best restaurant" in 2010, 2011, 2012, and again in 2014 by the Restaurant magazine, supported by the San Pellegrino mineral water company. Other restaurants in Copenhagen and the provinces have followed the trend, attracting increasing interest at home and abroad. Among those who have adopted the new approach to cooking are Ti Trin Ned in Fredericia, Geranium in Copenhagen, Maaemo in Oslo and former Restaurant Malling & Schmidt in Aarhus.

=== Fäviken ===
Magnus Nilsson's small restaurant Fäviken in rural Sweden closed in 2019 but has been very influential in developing and inventing New Nordic Cuisine.

=== FIKA cafe ===
At the American Swedish Institute, FIKA cafe serves New Nordic offerings. The cafe utilizes seasonal, locally grown vegetables and fish from Lake Superior, such as herring.

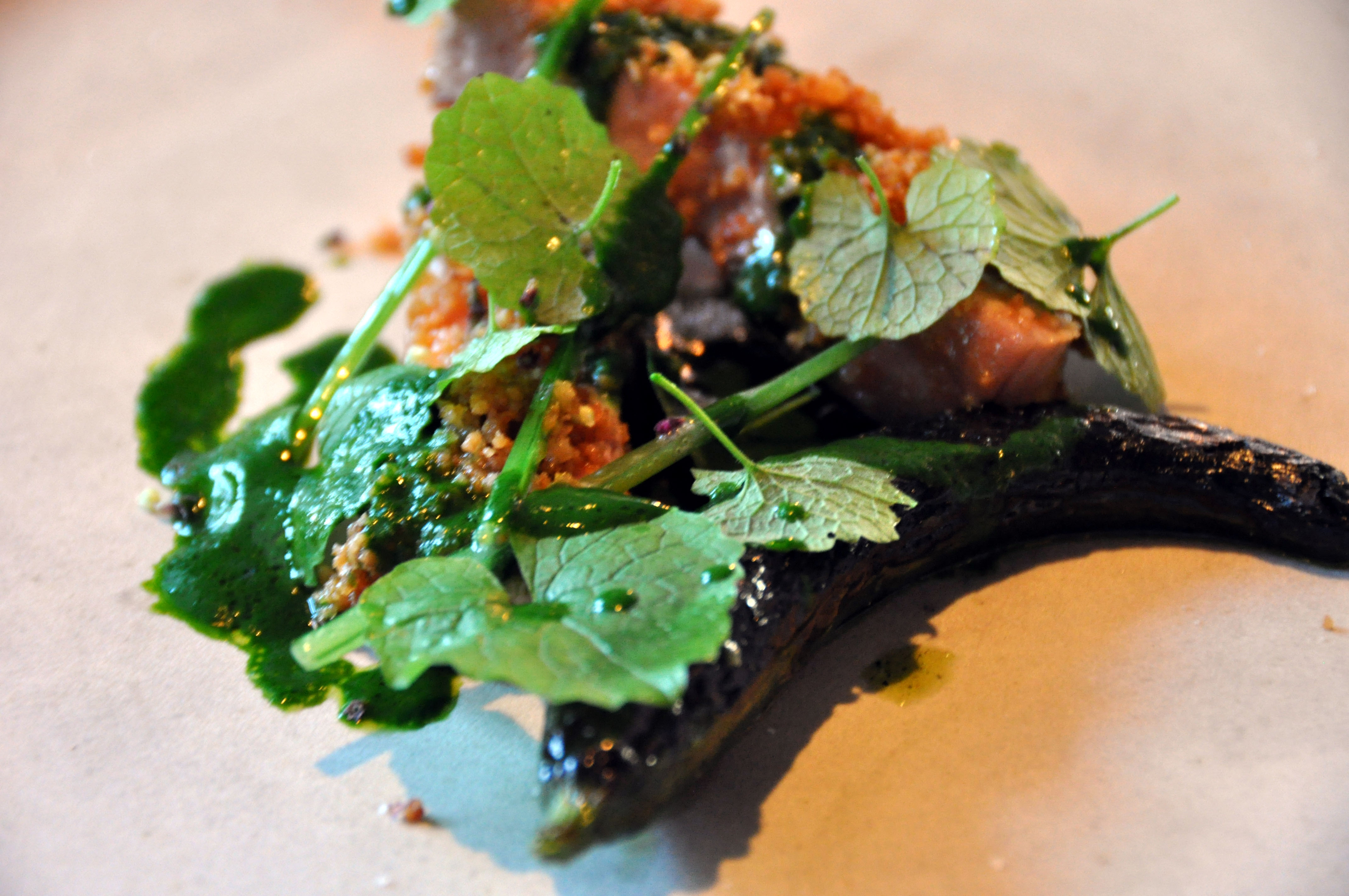
Fried bacon with ramsons and grilled cucumber

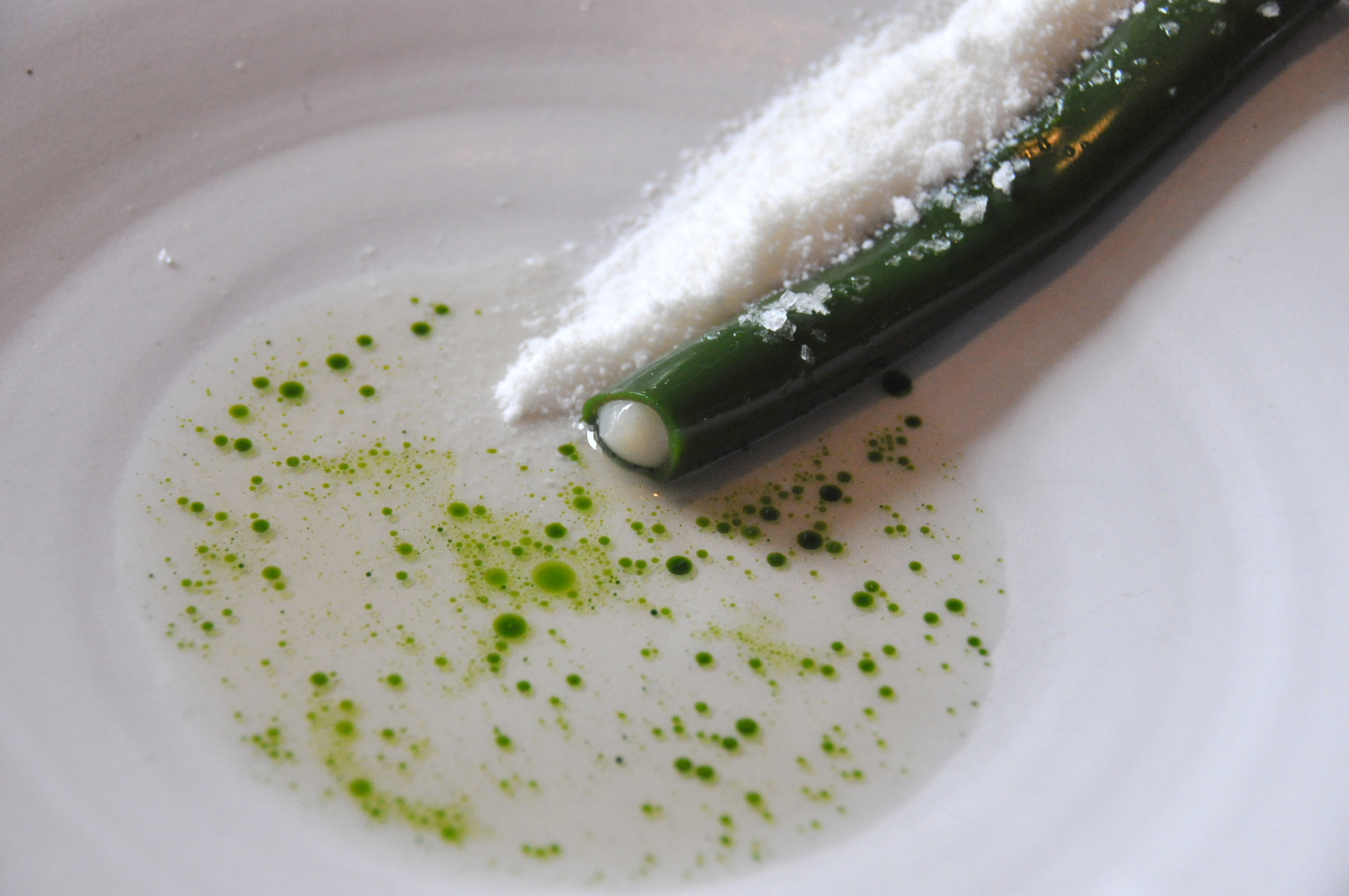
Raw razor shell with parsley jelly, buttermilk snow and horseradish

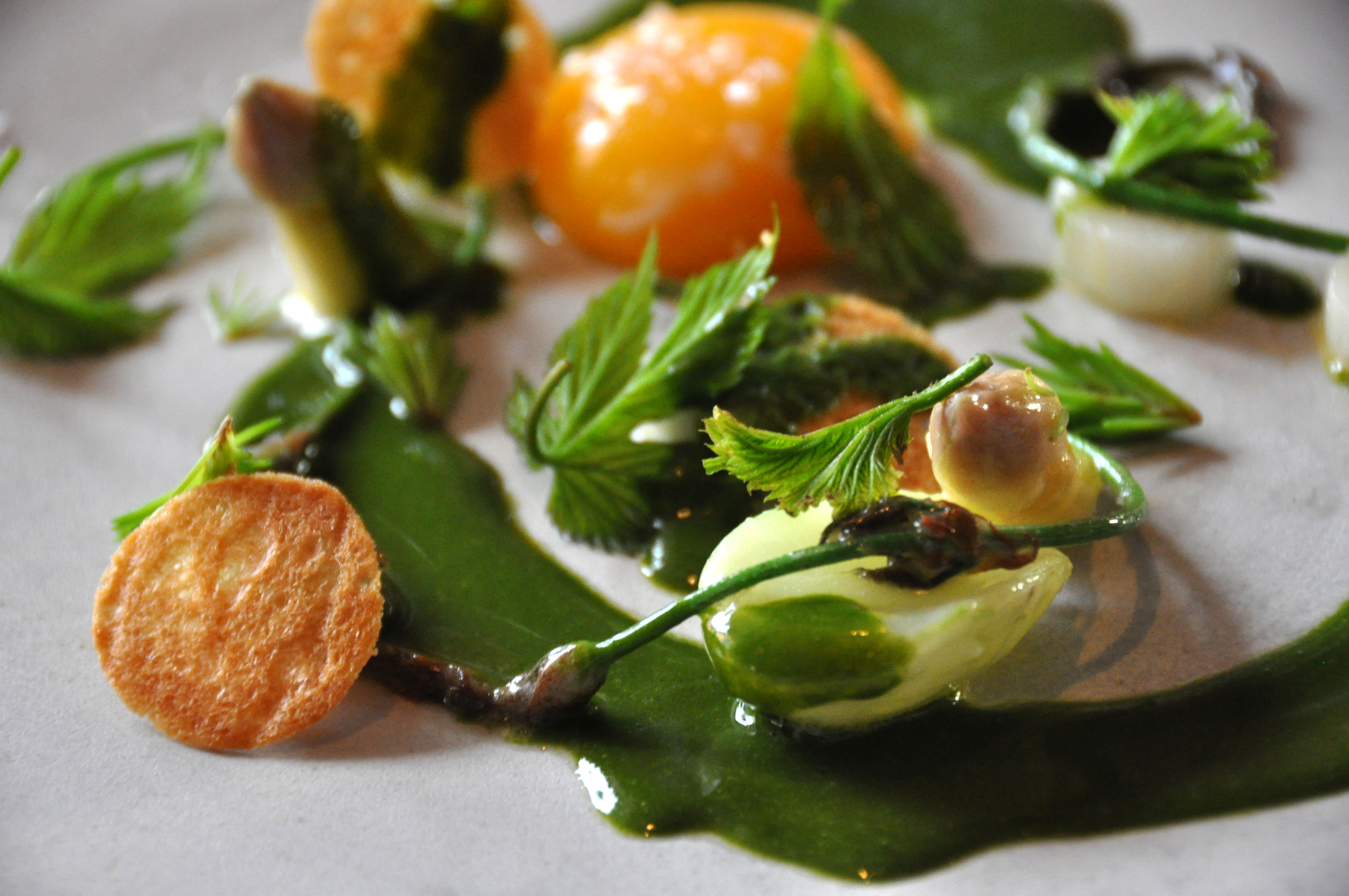
White asparagus with poached egg yolk and woodruff sauce

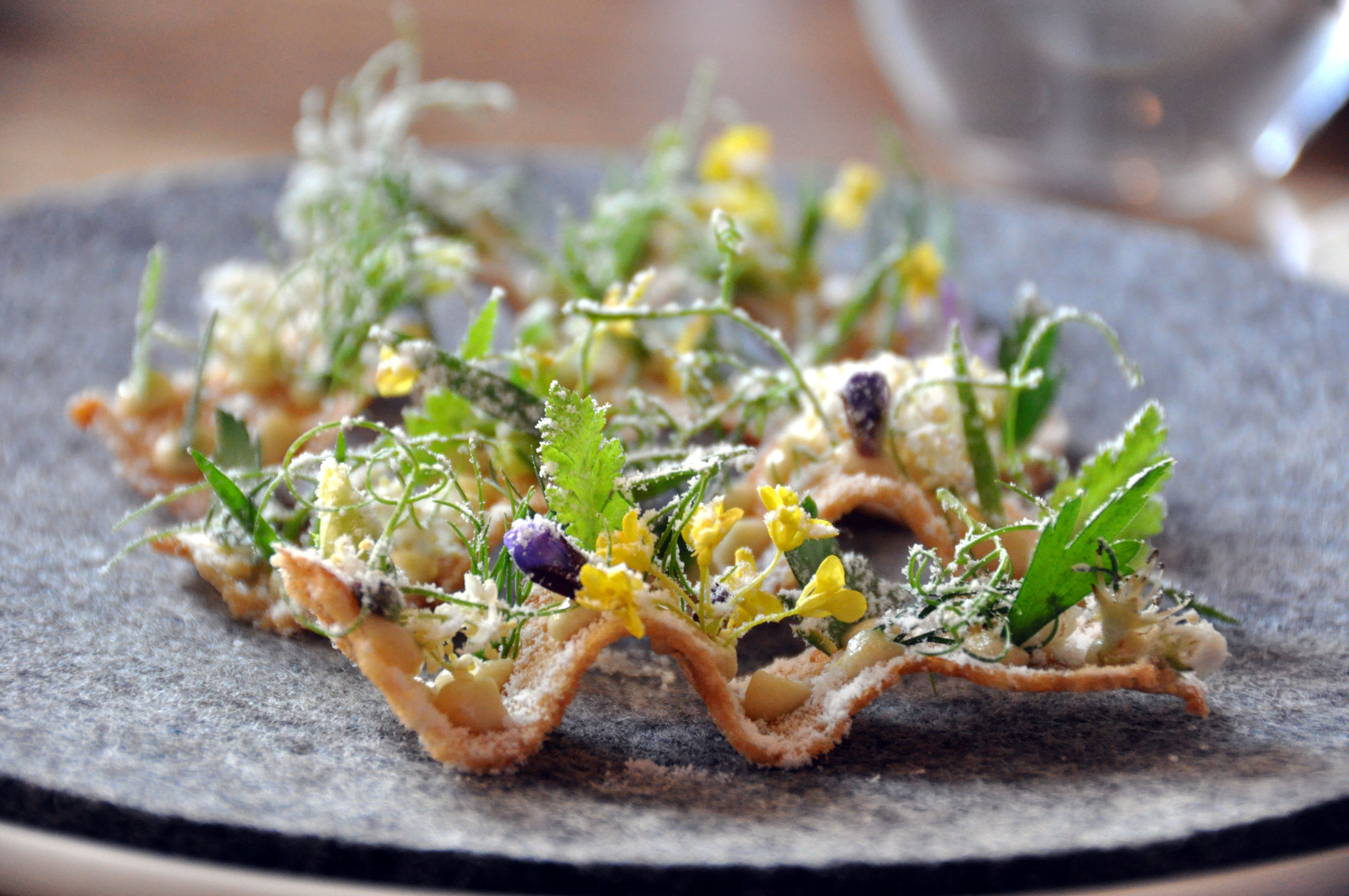
Toast with turbot roe and vinegar dust

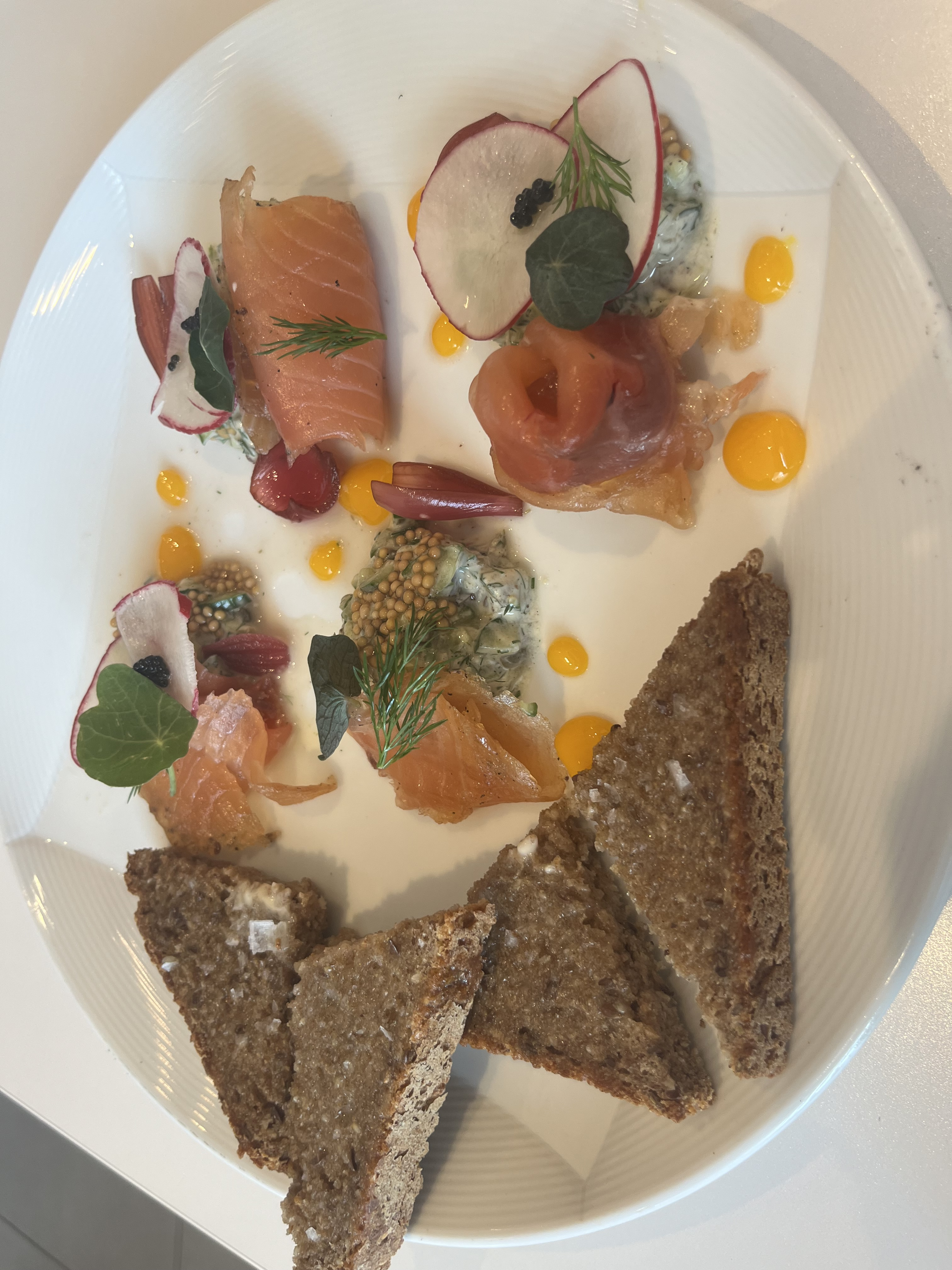
Gravlax and buttered rye bread with cucumber salad, caviar, radish, pickled onion, dill, and egg yolk at FIKA cafe.

== See also ==
- Nordic cuisine
- Culinary diplomacy
- Minnesotan Cuisine

== Literature ==
- Meyer, Claus: Almanak, Copenhagen, Lindhardt og Ringhof, 2010, 694 p. (in Danish) ISBN 978-87-11-43070-5.
- Redzepi, René: Noma: Time and Place in Nordic Cuisine, London, Phaidon Press, 2010, 368 p. ISBN 978-0-7148-5903-3.
