= Restaurant (magazine) =

British magazine

- June 2011 issue
- Editor: Stefan Chomka
- Deputy Editor: Joe Lutrario
- Categories: Trade magazine
- Frequency: Monthly
- Circulation: 16,642
- Founded: 2001
- Company: William Reed Business Media
- Country: United Kingdom
- Based in: London
- Language: English
- Website: www.bighospitality.co.uk
- ISSN: 1475-7338

Restaurant magazine is a British magazine aimed at chefs, restaurant proprietors and other catering professionals that covers the breadth of the UK restaurant industry.

== History and profile ==
Restaurant was founded in 2001. The magazine is published monthly by William Reed Business Media and had a circulation of 16,642 in December 2011.

It produces an annual list of what it considers to be the best 50 restaurants in the world, based on the votes of 837 "chefs, restaurateurs, critics and fun-loving gourmands".

== See also ==
- List of food and drink magazines
