= Stephan Pyles =

American chef and cookbook author

Stephan Pyles (born 1952) is an American chef, cookbook author, and educator.

Pyles is the author of five cookbooks on Texan and Southwestern cuisine. He hosted the Emmy Award-winning PBS series New Tastes From Texas With Chef Stephan Pyles, which aired between 1998 and 1999.

== Early life ==
Pyles was born in Big Spring, Texas, in 1952. He studied voice and piano and apprenticed in the kitchen of his family’s West Texas truck stop. After visiting France, he shifted his focus from music to culinary training. He studied French cuisine at The Great Chefs of France Cooking School at the Mondavi Winery, where he trained under chefs Michel Guerard, Jean and Pierre Troigros, Alain Chapel, Paul Bocuse, and Gaston LeNotre. He later wrote the book The New Texas Cuisine.

== Career ==
From 1983 to 1993, Pyles owned and operated the Dallas restaurants Routh Street Cafe and Baby Routh. Between 1987 and 1993, he also operated Goodfellow’s and Tejas in Minneapolis. In 1994, he opened Star Canyon in Dallas. The James Beard Foundation recognized Star Canyon as a notable new restaurant, and it was reviewed in Bon Appétit, Esquire Magazine, Town and Country, and Playboy. In 1998, Food & Wine described Star Canyon as a "quintessential Dallas restaurant."

In 1997, Pyles opened AquaKnox, a seafood restaurant. The following year, he sold Star Canyon and AquaKnox to Carlson Restaurants Worldwide. He subsequently opened new versions of Star Canyon in Las Vegas and Austin, as well as Fishbowl in Dallas and Taqueria Cañonita, which expanded to several U.S. cities. Pyles has participated in guest chef events internationally and was among five chefs who prepared dinner for Jimmy Carter's 70th birthday. He has also cooked for Mikhail Gorbachev, multiple U.S. presidents and first ladies, and Queen Elizabeth II.

In addition to The New Texas Cuisine, Pyles co-authored Tamales and wrote New Tastes from Texas and Southwestern Vegetarian. He hosted the Emmy Award-winning PBS series New Tastes From Texas With Chef Stephan Pyles, which aired between 1998 and 1999 and featured guest chefs including Diana Kennedy, Rick Bayless, Patricia Quintana, Zarela Martinez, Americo Circuit, and David Garrido.

Between 2001 and 2006, Pyles took a hiatus from restaurant ownership to travel, teach, and write. In 2006, he opened Stephan Pyles in the Dallas Arts District. In 2009, he opened Samar by Stephan Pyles, which combined Spanish, Eastern Mediterranean, and Indian cuisines.

He received the Outstanding Restaurateur of the Year award from both the Minnesota and Texas Restaurant Associations.

== Philanthropy and consulting ==
Pyles is a founding board member of Share Our Strength, a national hunger relief organization. In 1998, the group presented him with its Humanitarian of the Year Award. He founded Dallas’ Taste of the Nation event in 1988, which raised more than $1.5 million for local ministries and food pantries. He also serves as a life board member of the North Texas Food Bank (NTFB). In 1986, he co-founded NTFB’s perishable food program, The Hunger Link, which connects Dallas restaurants and hotels with shelters and meal programs.

Pyles has consulted for the Gaylord Texan Resort & Convention Center in Grapevine, Texas, American Airlines, and the Art Institutes International in Dallas. Since 2019, he has been chief culinary advisor for Ventana by Buckner, a senior living community in Dallas. In 2020, he shifted from restaurant ownership to consulting, licensing, and organizing culinary tours.

== Cookbooks ==
Pyles is the author of five cookbooks on Texan and Southwestern cuisine.

- The New Texas Cuisine
- Tamales
- New Tastes from Texas
- Southwestern Vegetarian

== See also ==
- Share Our Strength
