= Jean-André Charial =

French chef

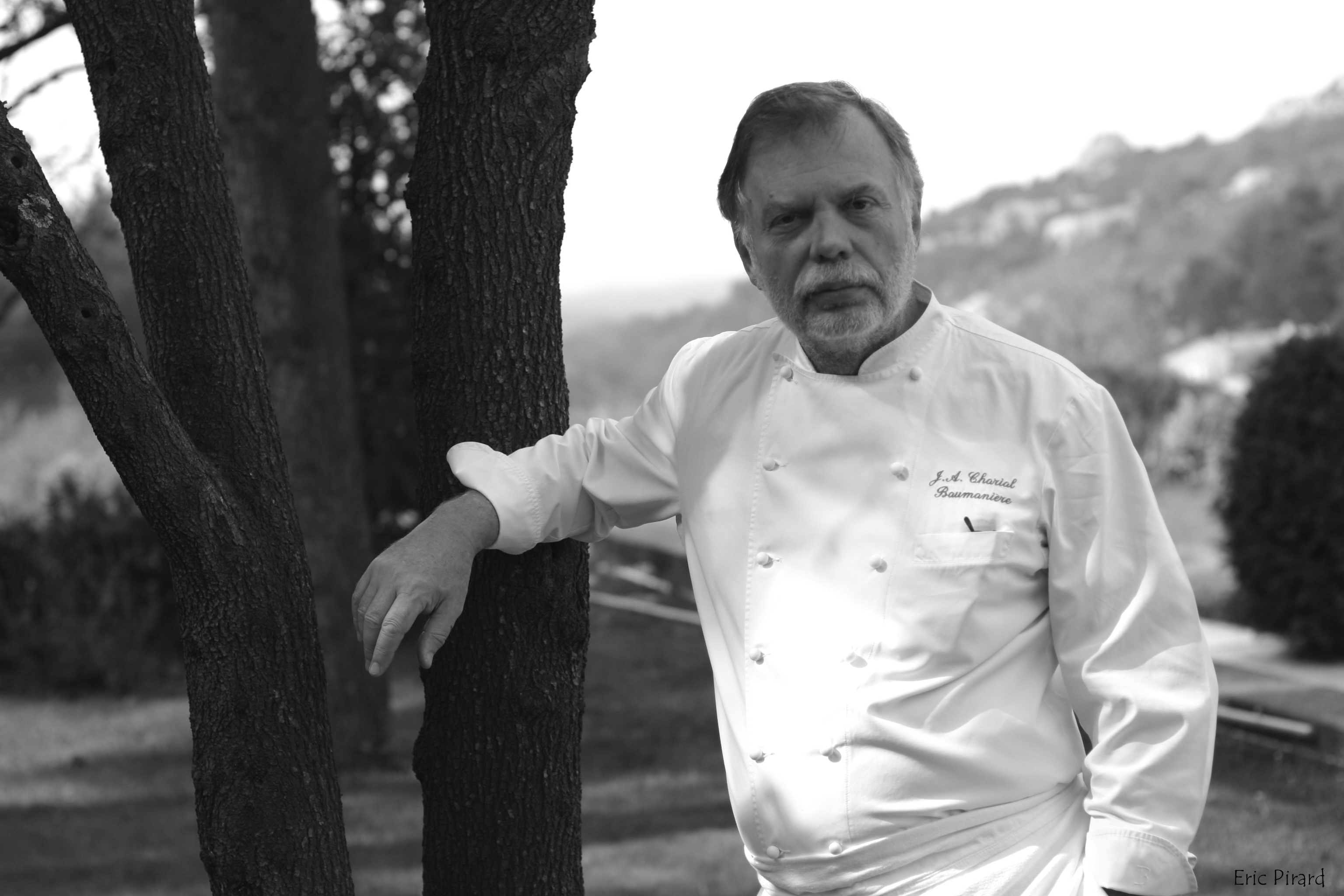
- Born: 7 July 1945 (age 81); Paris, France
- Culinary career
- Rating: Michelin stars
- Current restaurant(s): L'Oustau de Baumanière (Les Baux-de-Provence) La Cabro d'Or (Carcès)

Jean-André Charial (born 7 July 1945) is a French chef, owner of Baumanière in Les Baux-de-Provence, founded by his grandfather Raymond Thuilier in 1945, and of the gastronomic restaurant L'Oustau de Baumanière, which has three stars at the Guide Michelin.

== Early life and education ==
Jean-André Charial was born in Paris in 1945, the same year as the foundation of Baumanière which opened at the end of that year. He is the grandson of Raymond Thuilier, who opened the restaurant L'Oustau de Baumanière, and the son of Jeanne Savy-Thuilier, wife of Lucien Charial. In his childhood, he spent most of his holidays in the domain Val d'Enfer and has kept of it an incredible memory.

In 1962, Jean-André Charial obtained his high school graduation and entered the HEC Paris in 1964, where he graduated in 1967 after an internship the second year at the Waldorf Astoria New York. He then did his conscription in Tunisia at the cooperation as a hotel director in Skanes.

== Career ==
In March 1969, Jean-André Charial arrived at Baumanière, at the demand of his grandfather Raymond Thuilier, and started by the management of the administration. In 1970, he started working at the service and in 1973, he worked in the kitchens. It is at that time that he was trained by famous chefs, which include the Troisgros, Alain Chapel, Haeberlin, Paul Bocuse and Frédy Girardet, especially to complete his training.

Since then, he cooked at L'Oustau de Baumanière with his grandfather, and then alone after the death of Raymond Thuilier in 1993. In 1985, at the demand of the hotel company Taj, he opened a restaurant named L'Auberge de Provence in London in a hotel that belonged to the company, the Saint James Court Buckingham Gate. The London adventure ends in 2003 after the sale of the hotel to Crown Plazza.

In 1987, he became a consultant for the hotel Myako in Kyoto and gave classes at the famous Hattori school. In 1988, Jean-André Charial created the vineyard "Château Romanin" in byodinamic viticulture, being the owner until 2002. He followed the proncipe of the biodynamic at the Domaine de Lauzières, of his friend Jean-Daniel Schlaepfer, where are produced 8,000 bottles of "L'Affectif", his new wine made of old grenaches.

In 1993, at the death of his grandfather, he planned important investments at L'Oustau de Baumanière and at La Cabro d'Or, which have become five starred luxury hotels in Provence, and loyal to the inspiration of his grandfather, he developed the family company. In 2005, he opened a bistro called La Place in Maussane-les-Alpilles, that he sold 10 years later. Then in 2007, he rebought the commercial property of Le Prieuré in Villeneuve-lès-Avignon, a former convent that has become a Relais & Châteaux hotel. The same year, he created a spa at Baumanière. In 2009, at the demand of the Boix-vive family, former owners of Skis Rossignol, he took the direction of the restaurant of Le Strato in Courchevel, where he obtained two Michelin stars in 2010.

== Other functions ==
- Vice-president of the Chambre Syndicale de la Haute Cuisine since its foundation from 1986 to 1996
- Member of the administration council of Relais & Châteaux from 1987 to 2005
- Member of the Comité Colbert and the Comité Mistral
- President of the Syndicat des Vignerons des Baux from 1999 to 2012
- Deputy Mayor of Les Baux-de-Provence from 1996 to 2001

== Establishments ==
- Hotel Baumanière in Les Baux-de-Provence, 5 stars at Relais et Châteaux
- Restaurant L'Oustau de Baumanière, three stars at the Guide Michelin
- Restaurant La Cabro d'Or
- Baumanière le Spa
- Hôtel Le Prieuré in Villeneuve-lès-Avignon, 5 stars at Relais et Châteaux, restaurant with one star at the Guide Michelin

== Honours ==
- Chevalier of the National Order of Merit in 1991

== Personal life ==
Jean-André Charial has been remarried with Geneviève Charial since 1995. He has three children from his first marriage : Marie-Noëlie, Lucie and Thomas, who died in 1995. He also has an adopted child, Xuan.

== See also ==
- List of Michelin 3-star restaurants
