= Michel Sarran =

French chef (born 1961)

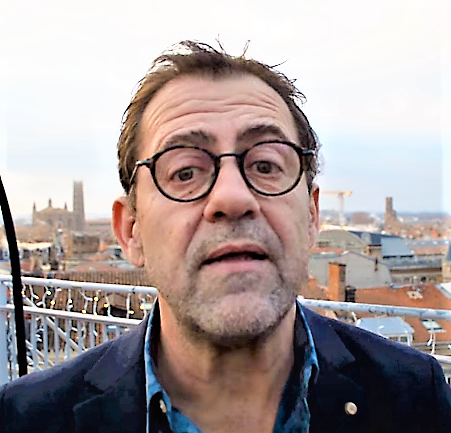
Michel Sarran,2017

Michel Sarran, born on 18 April 1961, in Nogaro, in Gers (France), is a chef from Toulouse whose restaurant, which bears his name, has been awarded a Michelin star since 1991, and two stars from 2003 to 2022.

He has been one of the jurors of the Top Chef programme on M6 from 2015 to 2021.

== Biography ==
=== Youth and training ===
Michel Sarran comes from Saint-Martin-d'Armagnac which sometimes leads to confusion as to his place of birth. After Patrick (who became a furniture designer) and Gilles, Michel is the third child of Bernard Sarran, a farmer, and Pierrette Sarran, who in her youth trained at a hotel school. He grew up on the family farm in Saint-Martin d'Armagnac. As a young man, he developed a passion for music. He also helped his uncle, who was a veterinarian, and it convinced him that he would like to become a doctor.

After graduating from high school, he moved to Toulouse and started medical studies without much conviction. After failing twice to pass the second year, he passed various entrance exams (midwife, nurse) also without any success.

In 1981, during Michel's studies, Pierrette Sarran opened a table d'hôte in the family farm, which had been transformed into a farmhouse inn, the Auberge du Bergerayre, which would become a restaurant in 1988. Michel worked there a little as a waiter at weekends to pay for his student lifestyle. After stopping his studies, he worked there permanently from the summer of 1981, first in the dining room before moving to the kitchens, at his request.

In 1982, thanks to an acquaintance of his mother's, Michel Sarran left to work at La Main à la Pâte, an Italian restaurant in Paris. At that time, he still had no notion of gastronomy or any real vocation, and was only doing this job in order to be financially independent.

=== Gastronomy apprenticeship ===
At that time, during a dinner of Bernard and Pierrette Sarran at La Terrasse of the Hotel Juana in Juan-les-Pins, Michel Sarran's mother approached the young (27) and talented chef Alain Ducasse and persuaded him to recruit her son.

Alain Ducasse contacted Michel Sarran in Paris and sends him for a year to train at the Bacon restaurant (one Michelin star) in Cap d'Antibes. There Michel Sarran discovered gastronomic culture and trained in basic techniques, Mediterranean cuisine and fish cooking. Alain Ducasse then sends him to do a training course in pastry making at Lenôtre. In 1984, Michel Sarran joined Chef Ducasse at Juana (where he had just received his second Michelin star) as a "commis entremétier". There, he learns the trade in difficulty. But it was also during this period that he discovered what cooking was all about and realized that he could find a means of expression to express himself and tell stories.

Alain Ducasse encouraged him to read to make up for his theoretical delay and took him with him to open the restaurant at the Byblos des Neiges hotel in Courchevel, but Michel Sarran did not like the mountain atmosphere. After offering him a job with Alain Chapel, Alain Ducasse finally steers Michel Sarran towards his home region at Michel Guérard's place.

In 1985, Michel Sarran went to work in Les Prés d'Eugénie, in Eugénie-les-Bains with Michel Guérard, who had a great influence on him. Michel Sarran considers him his mentor in the kitchen. He stayed there for two years, first as a kitchen assistant and then as a sauté chef.

In 1987, Michel Sarran became sous-chef of Michel and Jean-Michel Lorain's kitchen at the Côte Saint-Jacques in Joigny, where he learned Burgundian and Lyonnais cuisine but also became team manager.

=== Head Chef ===
In 1989, Michel Sarran became head chef at the Résidence de la Pinède in Saint-Tropez but only stayed there for a year and was fired for incompatibility of mood with the owner Jean-Claude Delion. He followed this up with a new position as chef at the Mas du Langoustier in Porquerolles where he stayed from 1990 to 1994. In 1991, at the age of thirty, he was awarded a Michelin star, despite the high speed of the establishment where he served between 300 and 400 meals a day.

In June 1995, he successfully opened the restaurant bearing his name in a private mansion on boulevard Armand-Duportal in Toulouse. The restaurant was awarded a first star in the Michelin guide in 1996 and a second star in 2003. Michel Sarran manages 28 employees with his wife Françoise. The couple has two daughters, Emma and Camille.

=== Diversification ===
Michel Sarran diversified his activity by carrying out consulting work for the Airbus Industrie VIP restaurant (in 2000), the Brasserie du stade toulousain (2002), the restaurant of the Fédération Nationale des Travaux Publics in Paris, Newrest (2003), the Elior Group (2008).

He has co-managed Café Emma (his eldest daughter's name) in Barcelona since 2011.

In 2014, he took part in the programme Cuisine sauvage on France 5.

Michel Sarran has been a member of the jury for the Top Chef programme on M6 from season 6, which was filmed in 2014 and broadcast in 2015, to season 12, broadcast in 2021. From season 8, broadcast in 2017, he coached the yellow brigade, which includes the winner of the show in 2017, Jérémie Izarn.

In 2018, Michel Sarran won the seven-year concession for the top-floor restaurant at Galeries Lafayette in Toulouse, Ma Biche sur le Toit, for which he signed the menu.

In February 2019, he appeared in the TF1 series Léo Matteï, Brigade des mineurs. He played the role of a headmaster of a cooking school.

== Awards ==
- Officer of the Order of Arts and Letters
