= Troisgros family =

French restaurant and hotel

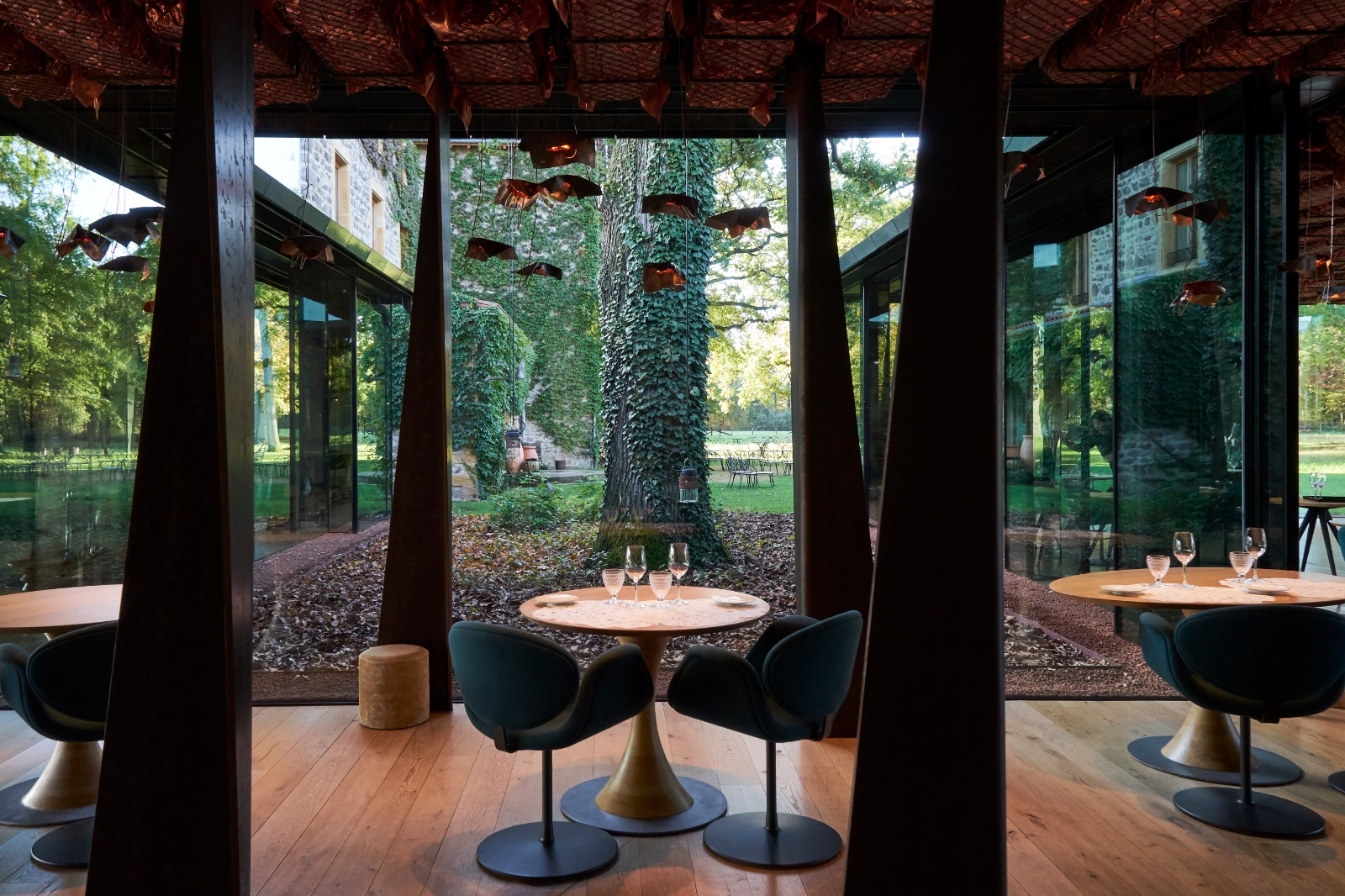
The dining room Le Bois sans feuilles in Ouches.

Troisgros (French pronunciation: [tʁwaɡʁo]) is a French restaurant and hotel with a primary location in Ouches (Loire, France) and additional affiliated restaurants in Roanne and Iguerande, in France.

It started in 1930 as a restaurant located in Roanne, held by Jean-Baptiste Troisgros and his wife Marie, then by their sons Jean and Pierre under the name of Les Frères Troisgros in 1957, and finally by their grandson Michel, owner of the current Le Bois sans feuilles restaurant in Ouches. It has been awarded three Michelin stars since 1968.

The hotel (five stars) has been a member of Relais & Châteaux since 1966.

== Biography ==
=== Jean-Baptiste and Marie Troisgros ===
Jean-Baptiste Troisgros (1898–1974) and his wife Marie Badaut (1900–1968), lemonade makers of Burgundian origin, ran the Café des négociants in Chalon-sur-Saône in Burgundy. They had three children: Jean (born 2 December 1926 in Chalon-sur-Saône), Pierre (born 3 September 1928 in Chalon-sur-Saône) and Madeleine (born 17 June 1935 in Roanne). In 1930, the Troisgros family settled in Roanne, on the borders of Burgundy, the Rhône Valley and Auvergne, on National Highway #7 (Route nationale 7), then a major highway. They bought the Hôtel-Restaurant des Platanes located in front of the train station, but did not own the property, which the family rented for 86 years.

The couple were entirely self-taught, and their restaurant offered a regional, bourgeois and friendly atmosphere. Marie Troisgros was in the kitchen while Jean-Baptiste took care of the room and cellar. Their cuisine was simple, "sincere and true", and hiding the flavor and quality of products with sauces or concealing them under bulky decorations was out of the question. The great wines of Burgundy, dear to Jean-Baptiste, were honored.

Quickly gaining notoriety, they renamed their business and restaurant Hôtel Moderne in 1935.

Their two sons, Jean and Pierre, were brought up in the almost sacred eulogies of the great French cuisine. At 15, both entered the kitchen almost "as one enters religion". Jean was trained in Paris, Pierre at the Hôtel du Golf in Étretat in Normandy; he also worked in Saint-Jean-de-Luz in the Basque Country. In 1948, Pierre Troisgros did his military service with the 62nd African Artillery Regiment in Tunis.

After receiving their professional certification (CAP [Certificat d'aptitude professionnelle]), the brothers worked together at Lucas Carton, a prestigious restaurant of the place de la Madeleine in the 8th arrondissement of Paris with the great chef Gaston Richard. They formed a lasting friendship there with fellow chef Paul Bocuse.

All three then teamed up in the prestigious restaurant La Pyramide in Vienne near Lyon, among the great chefs, Fernand Point, the boss with a strong personality, and Paul Mercier. Pierre and Jean had a short stay at Maxim's for the former and the Hôtel de Crillon for the latter, before returning to Roanne; their father, Jean-Baptiste, wanted his two sons to help him and eventually replace him.

=== The Troisgros Brothers (Pierre and Jean) ===
In 1957, the Hôtel Moderne became Les Frères Troisgros, with Pierre working as chef, Jean as master saucier and their father Jean-Baptiste as butler and sommelier with his knack for human contact. At the end of service, he brought his sons to the room and introduced them to customers. This was the beginning of an ascent to the heights of international gastronomy.

The Michelin Guide awarded them a first star in 1955, a second in 1965 and a much sought-after and very prestigious third star in 1968. They received a rating of 18/20 from Gault Millau and four stars in the Bottin gourmand. In 1965, Jean Troisgros obtained the title of Meilleur Ouvrier de France (kitchen category). In 1966, Pierre Troisgros served as chef for five months a Maxim's restaurant in Tokyo, Japan.

In 1968, Christian Millau was on the cover of his magazine Gault Millau stating: "I discovered the best restaurant in the world".

In 1970, the restaurant expanded with the purchase of a neighboring building. In 1976, they built a large kitchen.

In the 1980s, in collaboration with the Odakyu department store in Japan, Pierre created a brand and product line named after his family: Troisgros, initially available in five store locations.

On 9 August 1983 in Vittel (Vosges), Jean Troisgros died suddenly of a heart attack on a tennis court. On 29 October 1987, the Roanne train station plaza was renamed in his name (inaugurated by François Mitterrand, former French president). In its center stood a work by sculptor Arman dating from 1992: Les Gourmandes, which represented a stack of forks. Pierre was now left alone to manage the family business with Olympe, his wife, and asked Michel and Marie-Pierre to return from the United States to support them for a few months.

=== Jean Troisgros ===
Jean Troisgros was married and father of two children. His son Georges was notably a cook at the restaurants Lutèce and Le Relais in New York City.

=== Pierre Troisgros ===
Pierre Troisgros (died on 23 September 2020 in Le Coteau, near Roanne, at the age of 92) and his spouse Olympe Forté (1928–2008), of Italian origin, met in Paris and had three children, Claude (born 1956), Michel (born 1958) and Anne-Marie (born 1964).

Claude runs the gourmet restaurant Olympe in Rio de Janeiro and three bistros, including one in Miami Beach, Florida. He is the father of two children, including his son Thomas Troisgros, who has taken over.

Anne-Marie (former student of the École hôtelière de Lausanne), with her husband Yves Gravelier, was the owner of Restaurant Gravelier in Bordeaux from 1993 to 2014.

=== Michel Troisgros ===
Michel, born 2 April 1958 in Roanne, is the son of Pierre and Olympe Troisgros, and he studied in the École hôtelière de Grenoble between 1973 and 1976, where he met Marie-Pierre, his future wife. They left to travel around the world in order to learn the craft in big houses like Alain Chapel in Mionnay, Frédy Girardet in Crissier, Taillevent in Paris, Michel Guérard in Eugénie-les-Bains and New York City, Comme chez Soi in Brussels, Chez Panisse in Berkeley and The Connaught (hotel) in London.

==== Marie-Pierre Troisgros ====
Marie-Pierre Lambert, born 6 April 1957 in Sainte-Colombe (Rhône), also studied in the École hôtelière de Grenoble from 1973 to 1976. During her world tour, she worked in various countries, notably in Germany in the Black Forest, at the Hilton Hotel in Brussels, at The Connaught in London, at the Lapérouse restaurant in Paris, at Petrossian in New York City, at Michel Guérard in Eugénie-les-Bains and at the François family in Switzerland. Michel and Marie-Pierre married in 1983. Together Marie-Pierre and Michel have three children, Marion (born 1983), César (born 1986) and Léo (born 1993).

==== César Troisgros ====
César Troisgros, born 5 November 1986 in Roanne, is the eldest son of Michel and Marie-Pierre. He trained at the Institut Paul Bocuse in Écully from 2004 to 2007 before continuing his culinary apprenticeship in major houses such as Michel Rostang in Paris, the Roca brothers in Girona, Spain, Thomas Keller in California in the Napa Valley and a few months with his uncle Claude Troisgros in Rio de Janeiro.

In 2011, he decided to go to work in Japan, but the Fukushima disaster made him postpone his departure. He remained in Roanne to work alongside his father and became involved in family projects, notably in the move to Ouches. Concerned about ecology and biodiversity, the young man cited among his sources of influence the documentary film Tomorrow (Demain) and the peasant-philosopher Pierre Rabhi. In 2017, he joined Vivre bio en Roannais in the preservation of a bean variety, the Auvergne bean. After the family moved their primary business location to Ouches, César took increasingly important roles in the family restaurant, Le Bois sans feuilles, becoming Chef de Cuisine, at first under this father Michel, until he became solely responsible for the restaurant in 2023.

==== Léo Troisgros ====
Léo Troisgros, born 26 February 1993 in Roanne, studied at the Institut Paul Bocuse between 2012 and 2015. To complete his training, he joined major companies such as Guy Savoy in Paris, Benoît Violier in Crissier, La Grenouillère by Alexandre Gauthier in La Madelaine-sous-Montreuil and the Hotel Adlon in Berlin. In 2017, he joined the cooking team for the opening of the new establishment in Ouches, before joining La Colline du Colombier, where Lisa Roche, his companion, is head of the ranks. In January 2018, he left with his partner for a year in Japan. On 18 June 2020, Léo and Lisa took over the direction of La Colline du Colombier, and made it an independent establishment in 2024.

== Restaurants ==
- La Maison Troisgros Restaurant

After Jean died, Michel and Marie-Pierre teamed up with his parents. The father-son tandem lasted 13 years, until 1996. Embellishments were realized during this period, and in particular the realization of a suspended garden and new rooms. Upon the retirement of Pierre and Olympe, Michel and Marie-Pierre began a collaboration with the architect Christian Liaigre. They reviewed together comfort and elegance from A to Z. In the kitchen, Michel introduced new dishes and dared to free himself from the restaurant's past. Emblematic dishes that had become too systematic, such as the salmon escalope with sorrel, were removed from the menu. Creative and seasonal dishes took over. Michel's cuisine, inspired by maternal Italy and also by Japan, was becoming more and more inspired by cuisines from his travels. Acidity was also at the heart of his work. The narrowness of the premises, the impossibility of feeding a future project for their sons César and Léo, both cooks, led Marie-Pierre and Michel to leave the place of the train station of Roanne on 1 January 2017. The new establishment, Le Bois sans feuilles, opened on 18 February in the quiet of an estate located in Ouches, eight kilometers west of Roanne.

- Le Central Restaurant

In 1995, Michel and Marie-Pierre opened a café-restaurant-grocery opposite the train station in Roanne. The memory of the Italian salmon inspired them in the design of this simple and elegant place where precise, home-style cooking, such as a (tart with onion and dried ceps, and flat omelette stuffed with Fourme cheese) is served along with memories of voyages (fish and chips, Indian sauce or sea bream ceviche). It also sold high-quality products such as the judion, an enormous white bean found in tapas bars in Seville and an ingredient of choice for artichoke lovers.

In 2015, Le Central celebrated its 20th anniversary.

- Le Koumir Restaurant

In 2001, Michel Troisgros opened the Koumir (from Russian: кумир, romanized: kumir, lit. 'idol, diva') restaurant in Moscow, in a 19th-century mansion, between Pushkin Square and Red Square. This presence in Russia lasted three years. Faced with the difficulty in obtaining quality ingredients, Michel did not renew his contract.

- La Table du Lancaster Restaurant

In 2004, Michel Troisgros opened the table at the Hôtel Lancaster in the 8th arrondissement of Paris. A year later, he was awarded a star by the Michelin Guide. In 2014, the change of ownership put an end to ten years of collaboration.

- Cuisine(s) Michel Troisgros Restaurant

In September 2006, Michel Troisgros opened the restaurant Cuisine(s) Michel Troisgros in the Hyatt Regency Hotel in Tokyo, which obtained two stars in the 2008 Michelin Guide. The cuisine offered was close to the spirit of Roanne, but Michel left his chefs the freedom to create new dishes, which were initiated from local and seasonal products, leading to a French cuisine with a slight Asian accent. The restaurant closed in 2019.

- La Colline du Colombier Restaurant

In June 2008, Marie-Pierre and Michel opened a new establishment, La Colline du Colombier (lit. 'Dovecote Hill'), a few kilometers from Roanne, at Iguerande in the Saône-et-Loire of the Brionnais region. The rural and warm decor offered two lodgings for four people and three houses (cadoles) on stilts with balconies on the countryside. The project required almost 2.8 million euros of investment. The design and architecture of La Colline du Colombier were inspired by local architecture and were a first step into the countryside.

- Le Bois sans feuilles Restaurant

On 18 February 2017, the new Troisgros establishment opened. At the foot of the Côte roannaise, it is located at the site of a large house with a large farm, woods, meadows, orchard and pond. In the center stands the glass-walled restaurant, close to a hundred-year-old oak tree and intending to blend into the surrounding nature. It was called Le Bois sans feuilles (lit. 'The Leafless Wood'). On the farm itself were located the reception areas, the cellars and the kitchen. The large house has 15 guest rooms. The Troisgros family is assisted by key people such as chef Benjamin Chmura, directors Patrice Laurent, Carole Quint and Jean-Philippe Tacail. It features prominently in the documentary film Menus-Plaisirs – Les Troisgros.

== Awards ==
- 1968 : Michelin three-stars
- 1972 : qualified as "Best restaurant in the world" by Christian Millau of Gault Millau
- 2003 : Michel Troisgros is crowned "Chef of the year 2003" by Gault Millau
- 2017 : Michel Troisgros is elected "Chef of the year" by his peers at the Chefs World Summit 2017 (Ranking "The 100 Chefs" by the magazine Le Chef)
- 18/20 score in Gault Millau
- 29/30 score in Zagat Survey, who in turn said "Best restaurant in the world"
- 2020 : Michelin green star

== Bibliography ==
- Jean and Pierre Troisgros, Cuisiniers à Roanne, Robert Laffont, coll. « Recettes originales », 1977, 342 p.
- Pierre and Michel Troisgros, Les Petits Plats des Troisgros, Robert Laffont, coll. « Les recettes originales de… », 1985, 391 p.
- Jean-Bernard Naudin, Jean-Michel Charbonnier and Pierre Troisgros, Renoir. À la table d'un impressionniste, Éditions du Chêne, coll. « À la table de… », 1994, 191 p.
- Pierre and Michel Troisgros, Cuisine de famille. Chez les Troisgros, Flammarion, 1997, 193 p.
- Pierre and Michel Troisgros, Les Meilleures Recettes familiales des Troisgros, Flammarion, coll. « Gastronomie », 2002, 118 p.
- Michel Troisgros, La Cuisine acidulée, Le Cherche midi, coll. « Les aventuriers du goût », 2005, 287 p.
- Michel Troisgros and Bénédict Beaugé, Michel Troisgros et l'Italie (photographs by Marie-Pierre Morel), Glénat Livres, coll. « Hommes et montagnes », 2009, 313 p.
- Fabienne Croze et Laurence Duquesne, Balade buissonnière et gourmande… en Bourgogne du sud, rencontre avec Pierre Troisgros, Thoba's Éditions, 2010, 168 p.
- Michel and Marie-Pierre Troisgros, La Colline du Colombier, 2012, 286 p.
- Michel and Marie-Pierre Troisgros, La cuisine du Central, 2016, 190 p.
- Michel Troisgros, La joie de créer, dialogue with Denis Lafay, illustrated by Pascal Lemaître, Éditions de l'Aube, 2017, 192 p.
- Michel Troisgros, Vingt-trois soupes de bienvenue de la Colline du Colombier, Fabelio, 2019.
- Michel and César Troisgros, Servez citron (set of photographs by Éric Poitevin of plates served at Troisgros, accompanied by the related receipts, stitched by "Table rests", essay by Jean-Claude Lebensztejn), Éditions Macula, Paris, 2020.
- Michel Troisgros, dialogue with Denis Lafay, Le plaisir de faire plaisir, 2021

== Videography ==
- Paul Lacoste, L'Invention de la cuisine : Michel Troisgros, Éditions lahuit.com, 2009.
- David Gelb, Chef's Table, Netflix, 2016.

== Chefs who learned at Troisgros ==
- Elena Arzak
- David Burke
- André Chiang
- Traci Des Jardins
- Michael Hutchings
- David Liederman
- Bernard Loiseau : apprentice from 1968 to 1971
- Jean Michel Lorain : apprentice in 1977
- Gualtiero Marchesi : trainee in 1966
- Guy Martin : kitchen clerk in 1985
- Gérald Passédat : kitchen clerk in 1980
- Alfred Portale
- Judy Rodgers : student in 1973
- Guy Savoy : apprentice in 1976
