= Gérald Passedat =

French chef

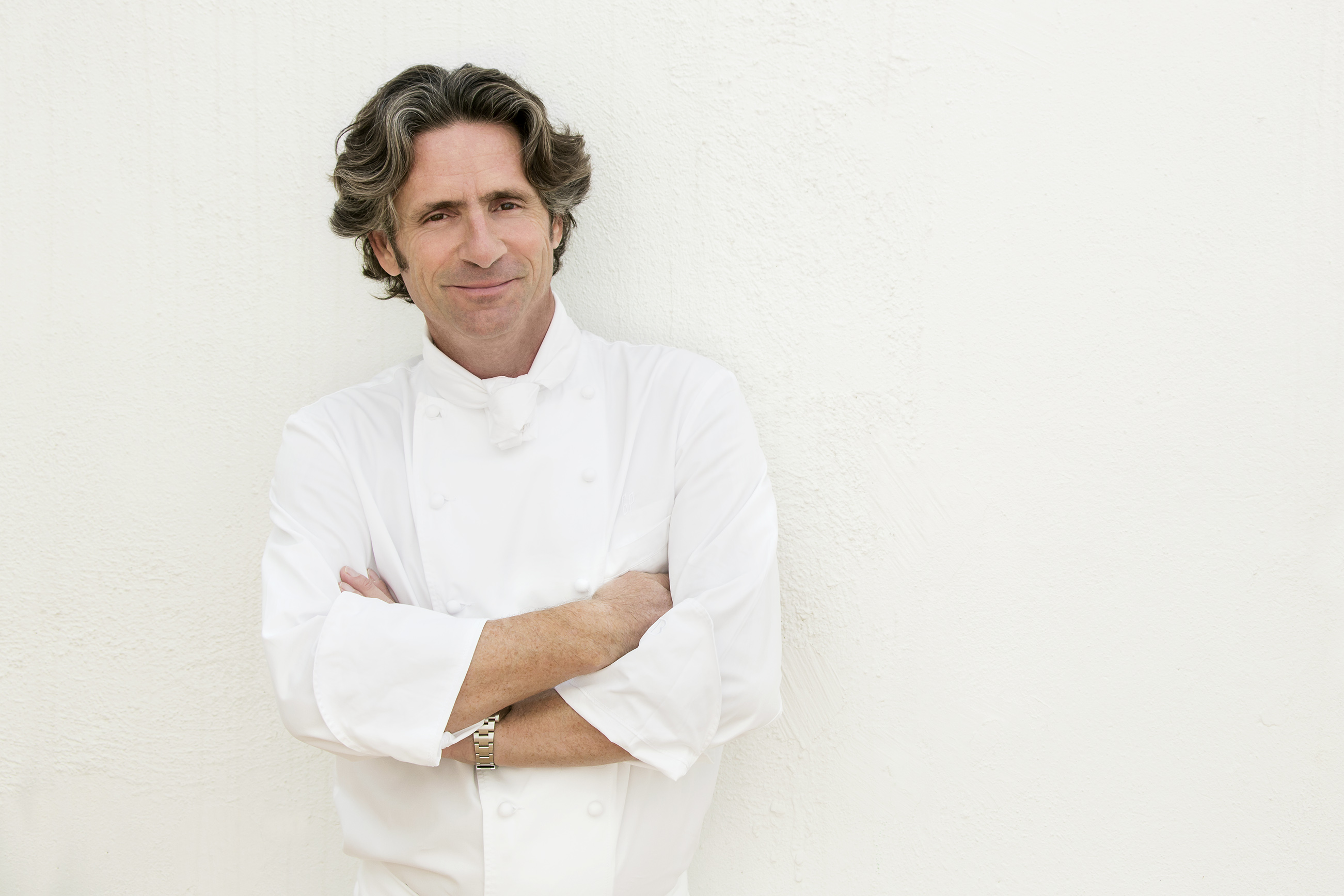
- Gérald Passedat in 2019
- Born: 24 March 1960 (age 65); Marseille, France
- Culinary career
- Cooking style: Nouvelle cuisine; Provençal
- Rating: Michelin stars
- Current restaurant: Le Petit Nice (Marseille)
- Website: www.passedat.fr

Gérald Passedat (born 24 March 1960) is a French chef, owner of the restaurant Le Petit Nice in Marseille. He has three stars at the Guide Michelin since 2008.

== Biography ==
=== Family ===
The grandfather of Gérald Passedat, Germain, was born in 1871 in the Tarn-et-Garonne. After a training in baking and pastry in Paris, he created his company in Marseille. He bought and sold several companies and rebought in 1917 the Villa Corinthe, next to the sea near the Château d'If and the Frioul archipelago and next to the hill of Notre-Dame de la Garde to create the restaurant Le Petit Nice.

His father Jean-Paul was born in 1933. Like his mother, he became an opera singer but also got interested in cuisine. In the 1960s, he decided to become a full-time chef and hotel owner. He transformed with his wife Le Petit Nice in a luxury hotel, which gave him the opportunity to receive a first Michelin star in 1977 and a second one in 1981. Jean-Paul Passédat also received the title of Chevalier of the National Order of Merit in 1988.

=== Childhood and training course ===
Gérald Passedat was born on 24 March 1960 in Marseille. As a young child, he spent his time in the kitchens observing the work of his father and the housemaids. He decided to become a chef as well and followed a rich eight-year training course.

- École Hôtelière of Nice (like his father)
- Le Coq Hardi in Bougival
- Le Bristol in Paris
- Le Crillon in Paris
- Restaurant of the Frères Troisgros in Roanne
- Les Prés d'Eugénie in Eugénie-les-Bains with Michel Guérard

In 1985, he joined the kitchens of his father's restaurant Le Petit Nice. He then became the chef in 1987 when his father became the manager of the hotel restaurant.

== Cuisine ==
As an enthusiast of underwater diving, the cuisine of Gérald Passedat is composed of a number of steps and is mostly made of fish. It is also influenced by the Provence and especially Marseille, for its different vegetables and herbs.

=== Forgotten fishes ===
His cuisine is Mediterranean, where he finds with the help of fishermen from Marseille, fishes that are often forgotten like the tub gurnard, the wrasse or the comber. These fishes, fished all around Marseille, come from different areas deep underwater. In many of his dishes, the fish succeed to crustaceans and is conceived in a broth or a carcass emulsion, without adding fat.

=== Desserts ===
His desserts are designed to be as visually striking as they are flavourful. Working with his pastry chef, he creates desserts with chocolate, liquorice and a variety of fruits.

- Pink Pralines
- Chocolate "Équateur" with raspberry vinegar

=== Signature dishes ===
- Sea anemones in iodized cream, foamy milk with caviar, watercress broth and shellfish
- Bass Lucie Passedat
- Lobster with clarified ginger and purple abyssal
- Bouillabaisse

== Honours of Le Petit Nice and the Passedat family ==
- 1977: one Michelin star (Jean-Paul Passedat)
- 1981: two Michelin stars (Jean-Paul Passedat)
- 1991: Jean-Paul Passedat is received at the Académie Nationale de Cuisine
- 2008: three Michelin stars
- 2010: Gérald Passedat is named Chevalier (Knight) of the Legion of Honour

== See also ==
- List of Michelin 3-star restaurants
