= Cuisine minceur =

Style of light French cooking

Cuisine minceur (French: [kɥizin mɛ̃sœʁ]; lit. '"slimming cooking"') is a style of cooking created by French chef Michel Guérard, which recreated lighter versions of traditional nouvelle cuisine dishes. Contemporary critics acknowledged that the minceur versions by Guérard tasted better and were less filling than their nouvelle cuisine originals.

== History ==
In the 1960s, along with Paul Bocuse, Alain Chapel, and Jean and Pierre Troisgros, "Guérard was a nouvelle cuisine pioneer who ... disrupted restaurant culture ... Breaking away from the long-established rules of French haute cuisine, the group pushed for food to look and taste more like the stuff it’s actually made from, to be leaner and lighter and brighter."

In 1974 chef Guérard arrived in Eugénie-les-Bains and, with his wife Christine Barthelemy, began renovating a spa resort which Barthelemy had been running, and which was owned by Guérard's father-in-law. Guérard began thinking about how he could persuade Parisians to make the 500-mile trek to the spa and his restaurant. The spas were for health benefits and his creation - cuisine minceur - became the logical avenue for his new form of low-calorie cooking.

Guerard stated he created "great slimming cuisine" when he moved to Eugénie in 1974, an area where patients with metabolic diseases used its hot springs. Guerard wanted cuisine that was more appealing than diet food but low in extra fat, sugar, and salt, saying he "realized the extent of despair towards food" that overweight patients at the spa were facing. On February 9, 1976, the method received new attention in the press when Guerard was featured on the cover of Time with a cartoon of Guerard, and the line "The new gourmet law: hold the butter."

== Books ==
- Cuisine Gourmande by Michel Guerard
- La Grande Cuisine minceur by Michel Guerard

== See also ==
- The Ten Commandments of Nouvelle Cuisine
