= Baroque (grape) =

Variety of grape

- Grape (Vitis)
- Color of berry skin: Blanc
- Species: Vitis vinifera
- Also called: See list of synonyms
- Origin: France
- VIVC number: 1005

Baroque (often spelled Barroque) is a white French wine grape planted primarily in South West France around the Tursan region. It can make full bodied wines with nutty flavors. Ampelographers suspect that the grape maybe a crossing of Folle Blanche (which it shares the synonym Bordeleza zuria with) and Sauvignon blanc.

== History ==
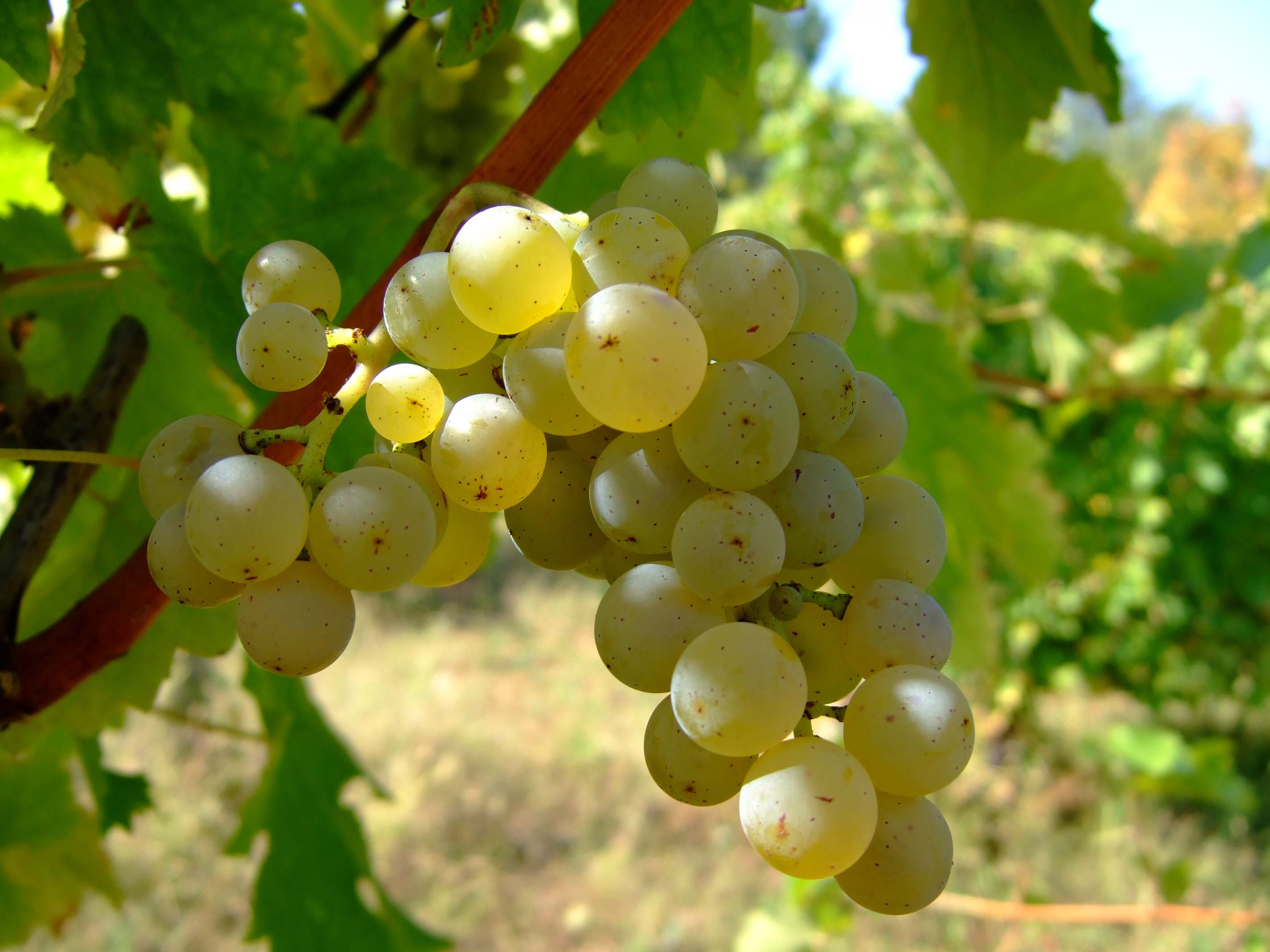
Sauvignon blanc (pictured), which shares many similar aroma characteristics with Baroque, is believed to have crossed with another French white grape variety, Folle Blanche, to create Baroque.

While the exact origins of the grape are not clear, ampelographers believe it may be descended from a crossing of the French white grapes Folle Blanche and Sauvignon blanc. While it was once grown throughout southwest France, today its plantings are primarily isolated to the Landes department which contains Vin délimité de qualité supérieure (VDQS) wine region of Tursan. In the 20th century, Baroque gained favor among vine growers because of its resistance to powdery mildew which decimated many other grape varieties. However, by the 1980s the grape was virtually on the edge of extinction because of the ripping out of vineyards in the Landes and converting the land to other agricultural and development enterprises.

Wine historian and expert Jancis Robinson notes that Baroque was saved from extinction by the efforts of chef Michel Guérard, owner of the 3 star Michelin rated restaurant Les Prés d'Eugénie in Eugénie-les-Bains. At the Tursan wine estate owned by himself and his wife, Guérard revived interest in the variety by producing an aromatic full-bodied Baroque-based that critics have described as "characterful".

== Wine region ==
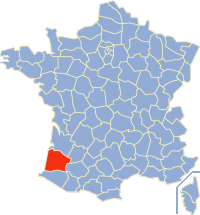
Location of the Landes department in Southwest France where Baroque is now almost exclusively found.

The grape is almost exclusive to the South West France wine region of Tursan, with very little plantings of the grape to be found elsewhere in the world.

== Wines ==
Baroque produces a full-bodied wine with noticeable alcohol levels and weight. It shares many of the same aroma characteristics as Sauvignon blanc.

== Synonyms ==
Over the years, Baroque has had several synonyms including: Barake, Baroca, Baroke, Barroque, Blanc Bordelais, Bordelais, Bordelais blanc, Bordeleza zuria, Boudales, Bourdales, Claverie blanc, Escripet folle, Muscadelle de Nates, Petit Bordelais, Plant Bordelais and Sable blanc.
