= Bordeleza zuria =

Bordeleza zuria is a synonym for several white grape varieties.

- Baroque (grape), a white grape from Southwest France
- Courbu, a white grape from Southwest France
- Folle Blanche, a white grape that is called Bordeleza zuria in the Basque wine Txakoli
