= Jean-Michel Lorain =

French chef (born 1959)

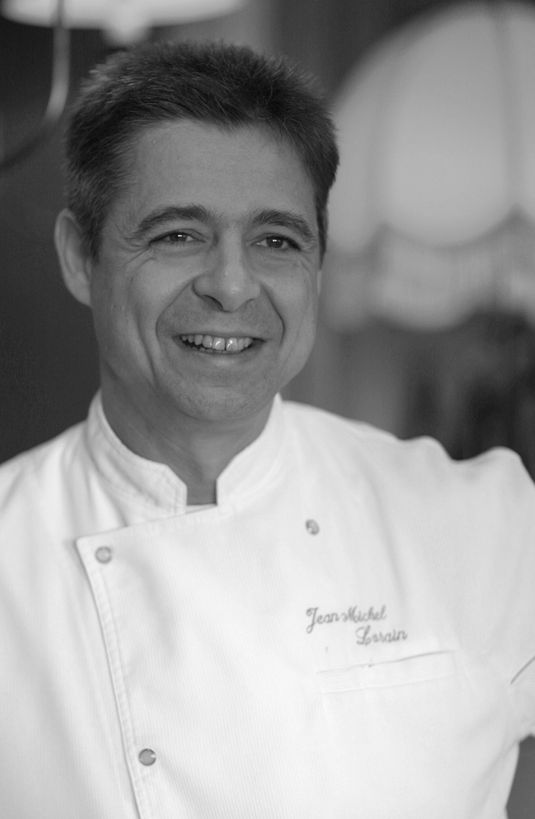
- Born: 7 January 1959 (age 67); Migennes, Yonne, France
- Culinary career
- Rating(s): Michelin stars (former) Gault et Millau (19.5/20)
- Current restaurant: La Côte Saint Jacques (Joigny)
- Website: cotesaintjacques.com

Jean-Michel Lorain (born 7 January 1959) is a French chef. He is the owner of the restaurant La Côte Saint Jacques located in Joigny, department of Yonne in the region of Bourgogne. With his father Michel Lorain, he was rated 19.5/20 in the Gault et Millau and had three stars at the Guide Michelin from 1986 to 2001 and from 2004 to 2015. He has two Michelin stars since 2015.

== Michel Lorain ==
His father Michel Lorain was born in 1934, son of Marie Lorain, restaurateur who founded La Côte Saint Jacques in Joigny, Yonne in 1945. Michel Lorain began his training course with a pastry chef and then succeeded to his mother at La Côte Saint Jacques in 1958 with his wife Jacqueline, a wine waiter.

In 1971, Michel Lorain received his first Michelin star and later a second one in 1976. The following year, La Côte Saint Jacques joined the hotel and restaurant network Relais & Châteaux.

== Biography ==
Jean-Michel Lorain was born on 7 January 1959 in Migennes at 8 km of Joigny, the son of Jacqueline and Michel Lorain. He obtained a scientific high school final exam before beginning his training course with the famous brothers Pierre and Jean Troisgros in Roanne in 1977, and later at the famous restaurant Taillevent in Paris with the chef Claude Deligne in 1979.

He then made his military service, joined his father at the family restaurant for one year, and worked with the chef Frédy Girardet at Crissier in Switzerland in 1982 for a year and a half. In 1983, he came back at Joigny to join again his father Michel. He married Brigitte and they have two daughters, Marine and Alexandra.

In 1986, Michel and Jean-Michel Lorain received the grade of 19.5/20 at the Gault et Millau and the third Michelin star. He became at age 27 the youngest chef to have three Michelin stars. In 1993, he was named "Chef of the Year" by Christian Millau with the exceptional grade of 19.5/20. His father finally retired that year.

In 2004, the restaurant La Côte Saint Jacques recovered its third Michelin star lost in 2001 due to important renovations to improve the establishment, and kept it until 2015.

== Honours ==
- Chevalier of the Legion of Honour

== Bibliography ==
- 1987 : La Cuisine une passion de père en fils by Michel and Jean-Michel Lorain, Éditions Robert Laffont
- 1995 : Desserts en fête by Jean-Michel Lorain, Éditions Nathan (for children)
- 2000 : Cuisine émotion by Jean Michel Lorain, Éditions Minerva
- 2006 : Les Collections Lorain : Légumes by Jean-Michel Lorain, Éditions Glénat
- 2007 : Herbes, salades, et fleurs by Jean-Michel Lorain, Éditions Hachette

== See also ==
- List of Michelin starred restaurants
