= Le Relais Bernard Loiseau =

French restaurant in Saulieu, France

Coordinates: 47°16′47″N 4°13′56″E

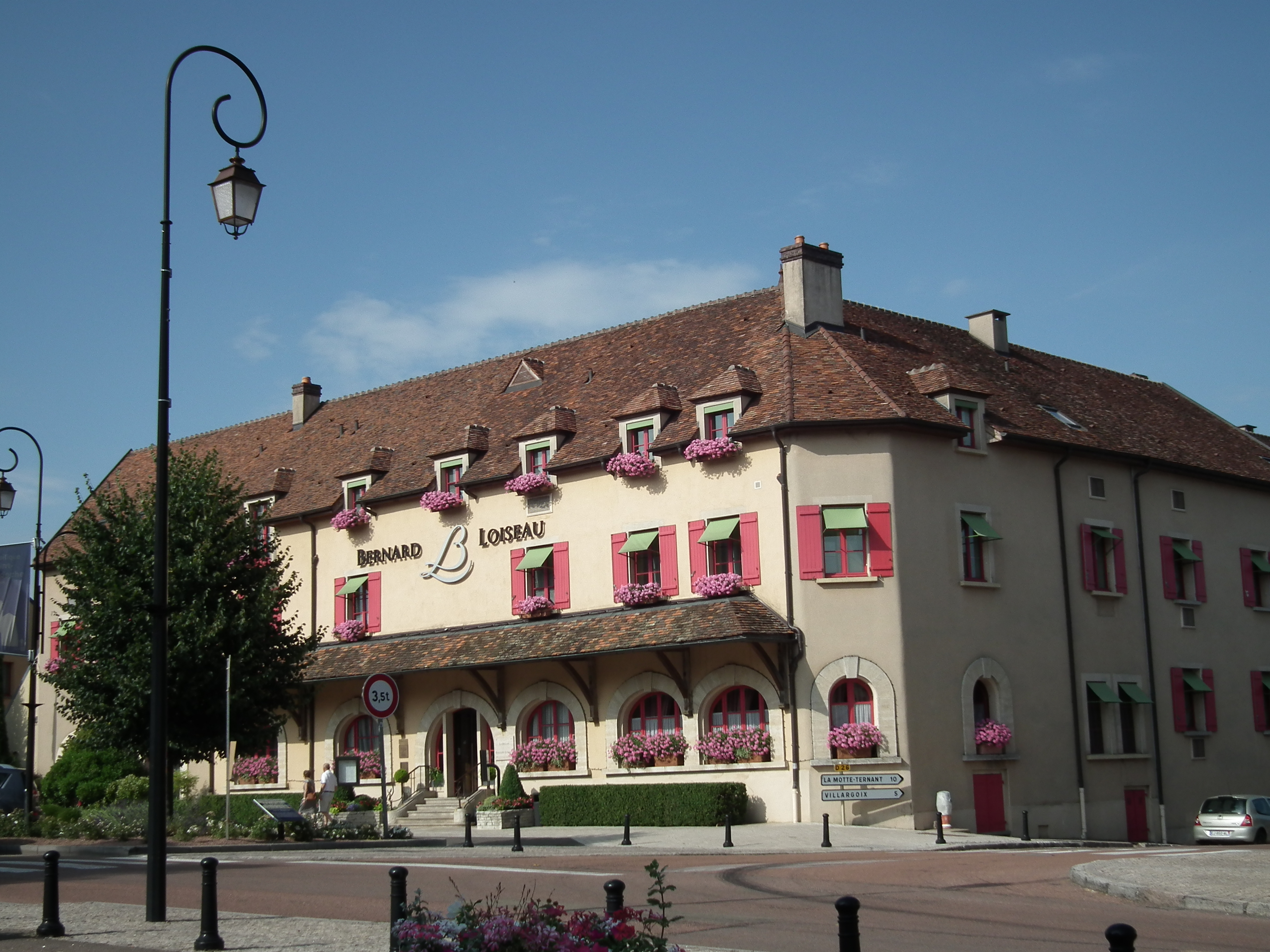
La Côte d'Or

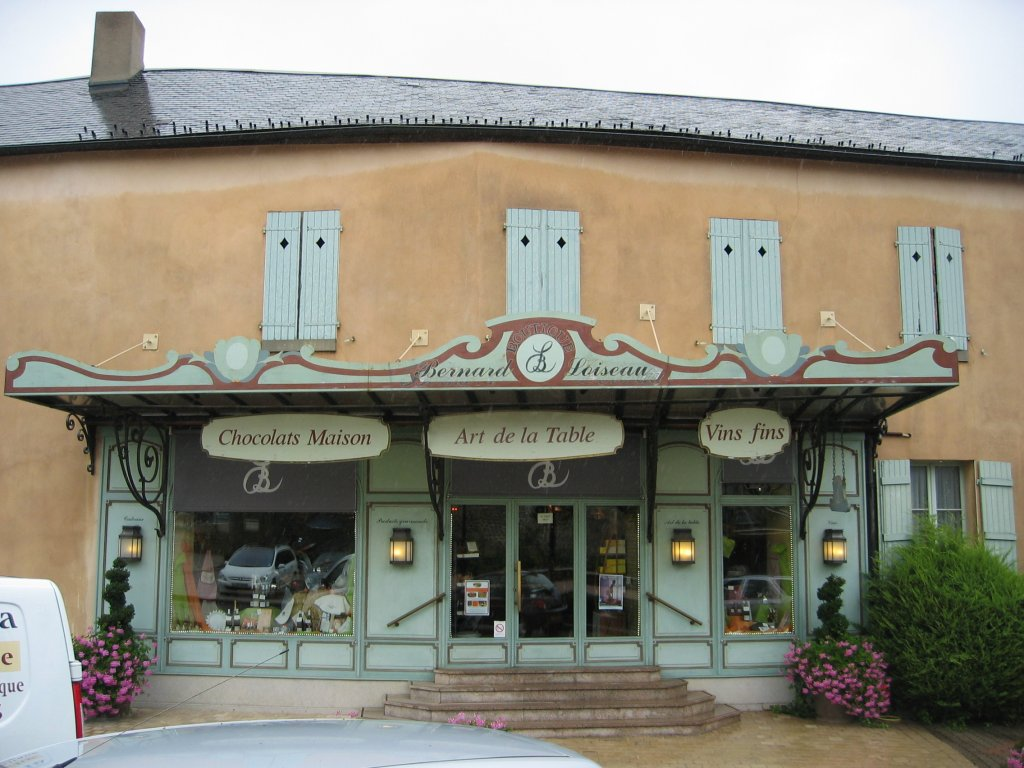
Shop of the restaurant

Le Relais Bernard Loiseau, formerly La Côte d'Or, is a Michelin Guide two-star French restaurant located in Saulieu, France. The restaurant was bought by Claude Verger in 1975, and Bernard Loiseau was installed as the chef de cuisine. The Michelin Guide bestowed a coveted 3-star in 1991, largely due to the fanatic attention to detail, frenetic work ethic and discerning palate of Loiseau.

After the Gault Millau guide downgraded the restaurant from 19/20 to 17/20 in the year of 2003, there were also rumors in Le Figaro that the Michelin Guide was planning to remove one of La Côte d'Or's three stars.

Loiseau was heavily in debt and suffered from severe bouts of depression. Loiseau died by suicide shortly after the restaurant got downgraded.

La Côte d'Or is now run by executive chef Patrick Bertron, after having lost its coveted third star in the year of 2016.
