= Bernard Loiseau =

French chef (1951–2003)

- Born: 13 January 1951; Chamalières, France
- Died: 24 February 2003 (aged 52); Saulieu, France
- Education: La Maison Troisgros
- Culinary career
- Cooking style: Haute cuisine
- Rating(s): Michelin stars AAA Motor Club Mobil Good Food Guide Gault Millau 19.5/20
- Current restaurant: La Côte d'Or

Bernard Loiseau
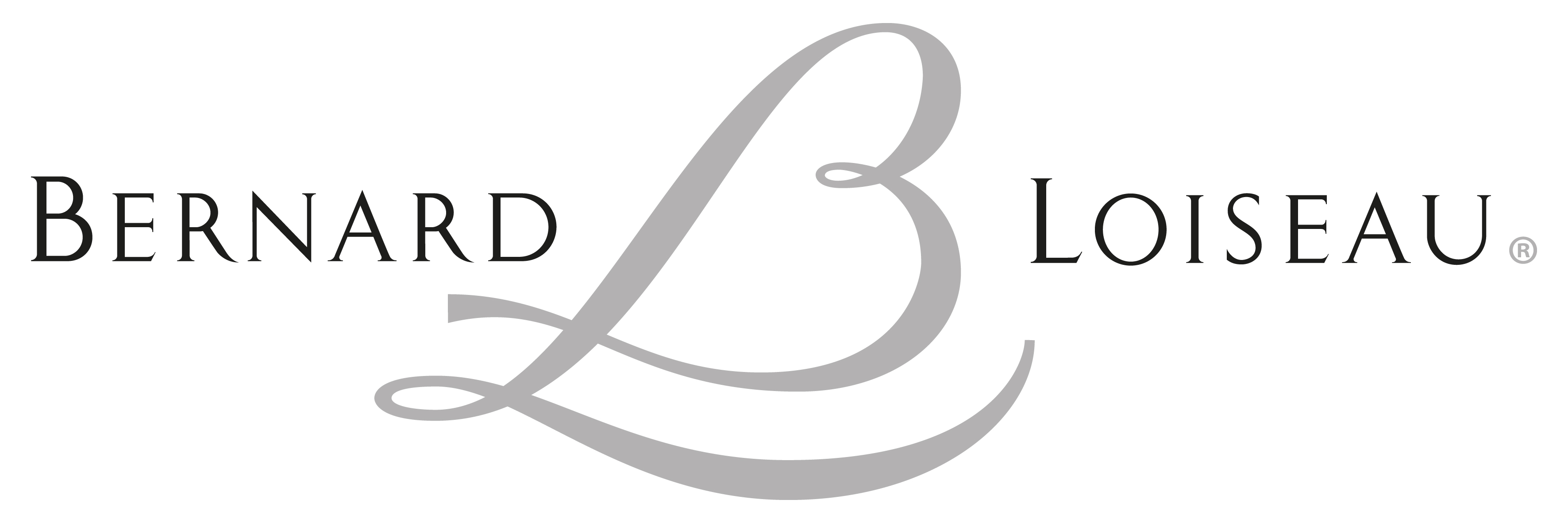
- Traded as: Euronext Growth

Bernard Daniel Jacques Loiseau (French pronunciation: [bɛʁnaʁ danjɛl ʒak lwazo]; 13 January 1951 – 24 February 2003) was a French chef at Le Relais Bernard Loiseau in Saulieu, Côte-d'Or. He obtained three stars in the Michelin Guide and had a peak rating of 19.5/20 in the Gault Millau restaurant guide. He was one of the most mediatised French chefs in the 1980s and 1990s.

In 2003, a short time after having become a member of the Relais & Châteaux association, Loiseau was downgraded from 19/20 to 17/20 in the Gault et Millau guide and received a strong negative media review from the gastronomic critic François Simon in the newspaper Le Figaro, but he still had his three stars in the Michelin Guide. As criticism continued to pour in and while the media speculated about a possible future loss of a Michelin star, he died by suicide by self-inflicted gunshot without giving any explanation. The theories aiming at explaining his death are the object of strong polemics. His decision was likely due to increased bouts of clinical depression.

== Early life ==
Loiseau was born in Chamalières, in the Auvergne region of central France. He decided to become a chef as a teenager, apprenticing at the famous La Maison Troisgros run by the brothers Jean and Pierre Troisgros in Roanne between 1968 and 1971.

== Career ==
In 1972, Loiseau began working for restaurateur Claude Verger at La Barrière de Clichy, and was soon hailed as a prodigy by the Gault Millau guide, a proponent of the nouvelle cuisine style that emphasised lightness and freshness in contrast to the cuisine classique of traditional French gastronomy. When Verger bought the formerly prestigious La Côte d'Or of Saulieu in 1975, he installed Loiseau as chef and soon stood aside to allow him to develop a highly personal style of cuisine. Loiseau bought La Côte d'Or from Verger in 1982, and the well-known Michelin Guide bestowed the coveted three-star rating on his establishment in 1991.

Loiseau's fanatical attention to detail, frenetic work ethic, and discerning palate propelled him to the top of his profession, and earned him a loyal but demanding clientele. He established Bernard Loiseau SA in 1998, and was the first star restaurateur to establish the concept of having one's restaurant incorporated and traded. At the time of his death, he was the only French chef traded on the stock exchange.

Under Bernard Loiseau SA, Loiseau published numerous books, established a line of frozen foods, and opened three eateries in Paris, in addition to running La Côte d'Or and its adjoining boutique shop. The French government awarded him its highest honour, the decorations of Chevalier (Knight) de la Légion d'honneur in 1994, Chevalier (Knight) de l'Ordre national du Mérite in 1986, Officier (Officer) de l'Ordre national du Mérite in 2002, and Chevalier du Mérite agricole.

== Death ==
In the late 1990s, a new form of Asian-inspired "fusion cuisine" swept France, catering to an international corporate class and pleasing trend-driven "foodies" (a neologism of the movement), which Loiseau resisted. The prevailing notion was that the pre-eminent Loiseau's grip was slipping—that his cuisine and philosophy were being superseded by newer trends. He was by this time deeply in debt, and suffered from bouts of increasingly severe clinical depression. Loiseau died by suicide on 24 February 2003, shooting himself in the head with a shotgun after presiding over the lunch service in his restaurant. The Gault Millau guide had recently downgraded his restaurant from 19/20 to 17/20, and there were also rumours in Le Figaro that the Michelin Guide was planning to remove one of La Côte d'Or's three stars.

Loiseau had made it his lifetime ambition to become a three-star chef, a goal which had required 17 years of hard work at La Côte d'Or to achieve. After his death, three-star chef Jacques Lameloise said Loiseau had once confided, "If I lose a star, I'll kill myself." While it was later reported that Loiseau was despondent over his debt issues and decreasing patronage at his restaurant, Michelin still received blame in some accounts. As of 2021, La Côte d'Or remains a two-star establishment in the hands of executive chef Patrick Bertron.

== In popular media ==
The plot of the 2007 Pixar animated film Ratatouille has its roots in Loiseau's life story, with the film's character of chef Auguste Gusteau being inspired by both Loiseau and Paul Bocuse. La Côte d'Or was one of the restaurants visited by director Brad Bird and others in France.
