= Alain Coumont =

Belgian chef and restaurateur (born 1961)

Alain Coumont (born 4 March 1961) is a Belgian chef and restaurateur, and founder of Le Pain Quotidien.

== Biography ==
Coumont is the son and grandson of grocers. His grandmother ran a hotel in front of the train station in Huy, Belgium. As a child in Belgium, Coumont spent countless hours perched on a chair, watching his grandmother make bread.

In 1977, after a voyage to the United States, where he was impressed by the success of Michel Guérard, he abandoned his classical studies and enrolled in the Hotel School of Namur in Belgium. After graduating, Coumont worked in several highly regarded restaurants including Michel Guérard (Eugenie Les Bains, France), Georges Blanc (Vonnas, France) and Joël Robuchon (Paris, France).

As a young chef in Brussels, Coumont could not find the right bread for his restaurant. Passionate about quality, he returned to his roots and opened a small bakery where he could knead flour, salt and water into the rustic loaves of his childhood. Coumont opened his bakery in rue Antoine Dansaert in Brussels in 1990, in those days an avant-garde quarter of Belgian fashion. He named his bakery “Le Pain Quotidien.” Brussels quickly took to the taste of this traditional bread. Alain evolved his offering to include simple salads and tartines, keeping bread the cornerstone of the menu. At a local flea market, Coumont found a long table where his guests could sit to eat together; it became Le Pain Quotidien's first communal table.

Success was rapid and Coumont had numerous candidates who wanted to open other Le Pain Quotidien outlets. In the space of a few months, 10 locations opened in Brussels. Coumont then followed his dream to open restaurants in the United States. In 1997, Coumont opened his first store on 1131 Madison Avenue in New York City, which was an instant success. Shortly thereafter, he met a group of Belgian investors who backed his U.S. expansion plans. With this financial support, he opened several locations in New York City and later in Los Angeles. Today the company operates over 260 restaurants in 22 countries, with a workforce of over 5000 employees.

Coumont currently serves as the company's chief creative officer. In this role, he is the driving force behind the brand's dedication to organic ingredients. Coumont spends most of this time traveling to support the concept throughout the world.

Coumont is also the co-founder of BioGhetto.com, and partnering with natural wine maker Philippe Formentin. The company produces a line of Natural organic wines with no added sulfites, Under the "Opi D'Aqui" estate Labels. The small production 18,000 bottles is exported on four continents. Specially in Natural wine stores & Bar, and numerous Michelin Star restaurants. Alain Coumont share his time between New York City and his farm/organic food research and training center in the Languedoc region in the south of France

Alain Coumont also created Le Botaniste, a plant-based fast casual restaurant concept and natural wine bar, 100% organic and 100% botanical (vegan), and gluten free; the first restaurant opened in Ghent, Belgium in September 2015. A second restaurant opened in New York City in January 2016. With the success of the two first locations, the company decided to expand so a third opened at 127 Grand street in New York City in November 2017, a fourth in August 2018 in Brussels, Belgium in the EU Schuman area. The company aims to have 10 restaurants by mid 2020.

Alain is also a cookbook writer, with Minceur Exquise (1990), Cook & Book, Le Pain Quotidien cookbook, Le Pain Quotidien recettes originales.
