= David Liederman =

American chef and businessman (1949–2024)

David Liederman (March 15, 1949 – July 4, 2024) was an American chef and businessman. He is best known for creating David's Cookies company (owned by Fairfield Gourmet Foods Corporation as of 2015), which produces a line of desserts, baked goods and cookie dough. He ceased to be associated with David's Cookies in 1996.

== Early life ==
Liederman was born on March 15, 1949, in Manhattan, New York. He was the son of Adele Kaplan, director of the Rutgers University Small Business Development Center's women division, and Donald E. Liederman, chairman and president of the Capital Energy Corporation, an‐oil drilling business based in Beverly Hills. He had a brother named William. His parents divorced when he was three years old, and his brother was one year old. He was raised in Princeton, New Jersey. Arthur Adlerstein, Liederman's stepfather, was a professor of psychology at Princeton University. Liederman attended the Hun School of Princeton. Liederman attended Denison University in Granville, Ohio, and later graduated from State University of New York, college at Old Westbury, receiving a law degree.

== Career ==
When he was 19, Liederman went to France, he met the Troisgros brothers, which led to his interest in finding a career preparing food. He became the first American to work as a cook at Troisgros, a Michelin three-star restaurant in Roanne, France. Despite his work at Troisgros, Liederman still had no experience with culinary training. While he was studying for a degree at Brooklyn Law School and clerking for Judge Maxine Duberstein of the New Jersey State Supreme Court, he began taking classes at night in the culinary program at New York Technical College (now the New York City College of Technology) in downtown Brooklyn.

In 1989, Liederman co-wrote Running Through Walls, a book on how to do a startup. It includes recommendations for doing a business plan, raising money and business formation. In 1990 David co-wrote a diet book called David's Delicious Weight-Loss Program with freelance writer Joan Schwartz. In the mid-1990s Liederman opened a theme restaurant, Television City, in Rockefeller Center. The restaurant had an early days television motif and celebrity backing. Later in the 1990s he opened Chez Louis, an homage to Antoine Magnin of Chez l'Ami Louis in Paris, which specializes in roasted chicken.

Starting with a $30,000 investment, he opened his first David's Cookies store in Manhattan on Second Avenue, near 54th Street in 1979, next door to Chez Louis.

Liederman built David's Cookies into a $35 million-a-year food retailer within six years. As of 2015, David's Cookies had grown to 100 million-a-year. The batter is mixed in Fairfield, New Jersey and the dough is sold to distributors. However, David's Cookies under Liederman's leadership would cease to thrive by the late 1980s, with numerous stores closing due to operating costs. Liederman sold David's Cookies in 1996. After being acquired by the New Jersey–based Fairfield Gourmet Foods Corp., David's Cookies evolved into a full line dessert supplier.

Despite being more known for his cookie products, Liederman's passion was the restaurant world. He would open various restaurants, including grills, throughout the state of New York.

== Personal life and death ==
From 1994 up until his death in 2024, Liederman lived in Katonah, New York. On June 19, 1979, he married Susan Richardson Vare, an actress, with whom he had two daughters, Katie Liederman, a psychotherapist, and Elizabeth Liederman Rossi, who worked in marketing for the New York Yankees.

Liederman died in Mount Kisco, New York, on July 4, 2024, at the age of 75. According to his wife, his cause of death was a heart attack, though he was also being treated for myelofibrosis.
