= Le Pain Quotidien =

International chain of bakery-restaurants

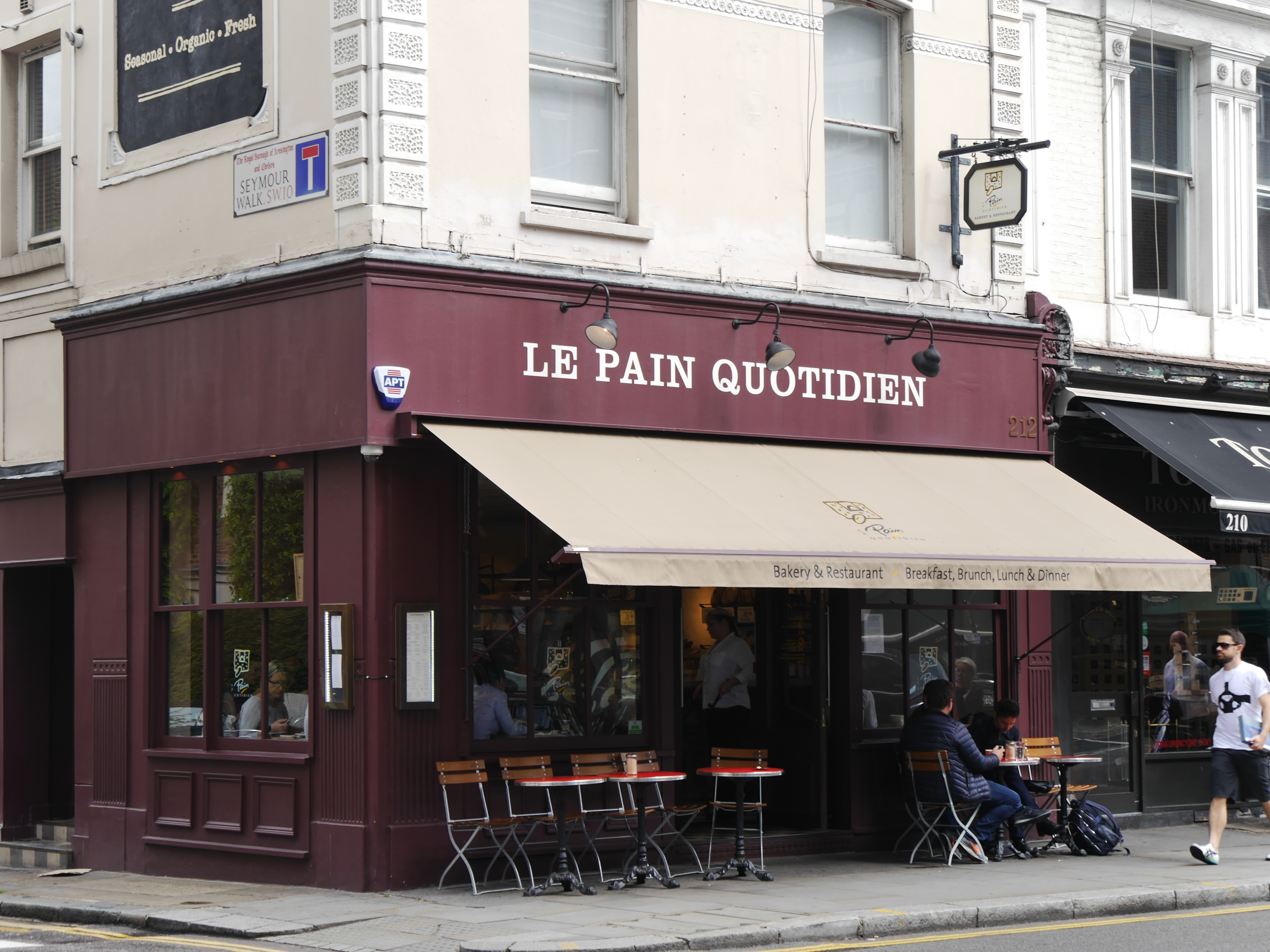
- Le Pain Quotidien, Chelsea, London
- Founded: 26 October 1990; 35 years ago
- Founder: Alain Coumont
- Headquarters: New York City (U.S. division)
- Website: www.lepainquotidien.com

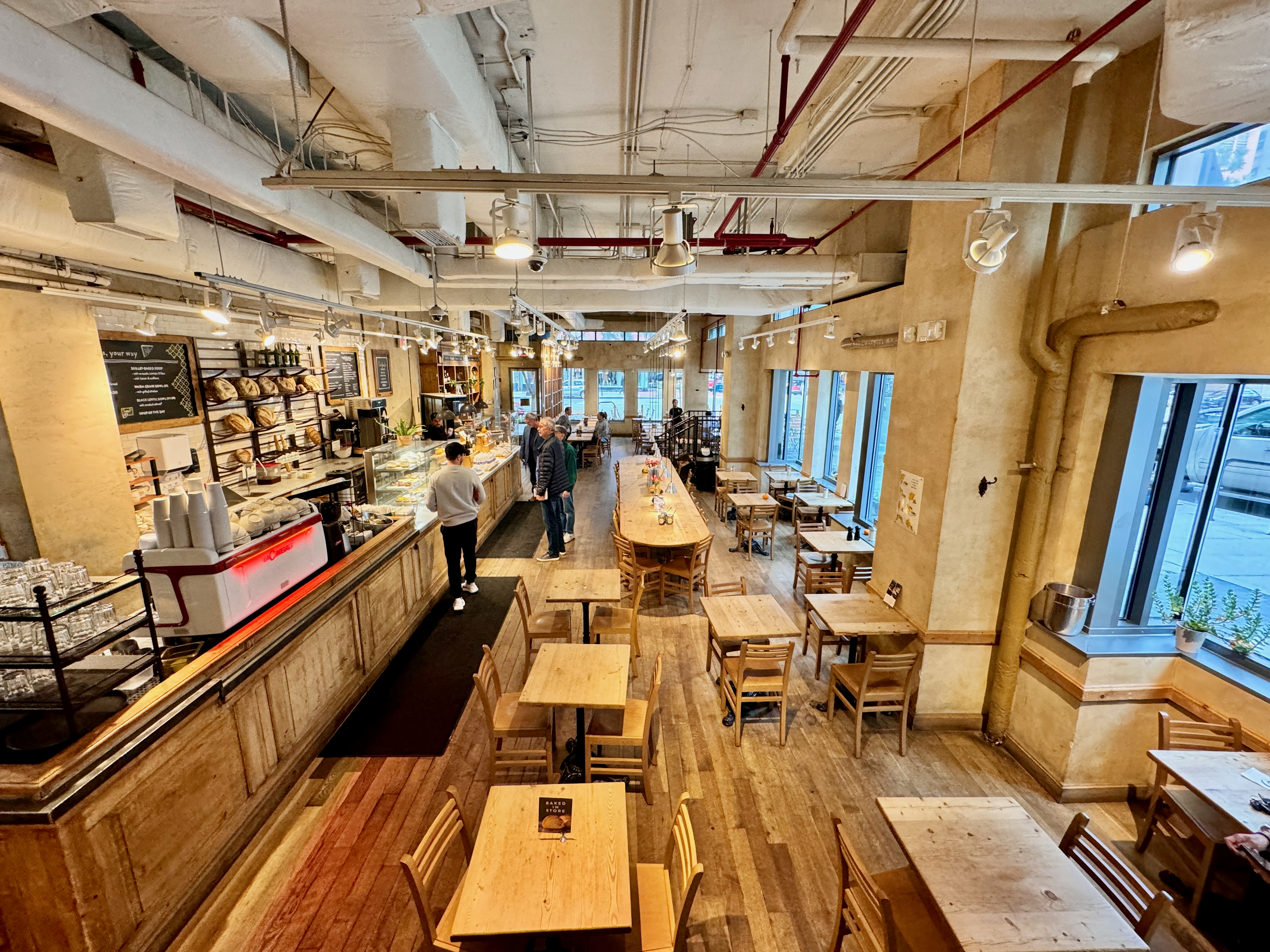
The interior of a Le Pain Quotidien in Washington, D.C.

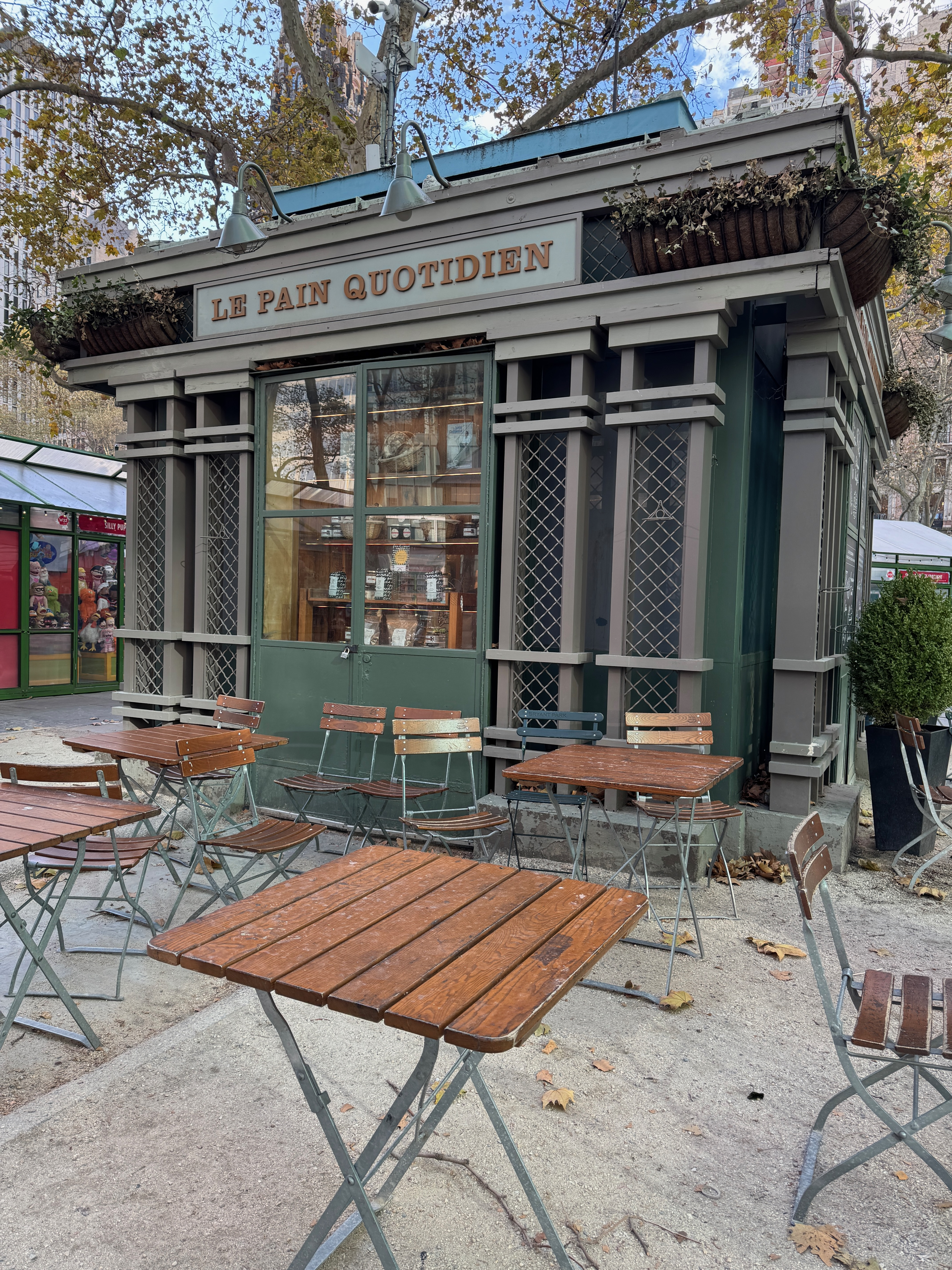
A Le Pain Quotidien in Bryant Park, New York City

Le Pain Quotidien (French for the daily bread) is an international chain of bakery-restaurants. It sells baked goods, bread, salads, sandwiches, beverages, and tartines.

Le Pain Quotidien operates more than 260 bakery-restaurant locations worldwide in 20 countries, including Argentina, Uruguay, Belgium, the Netherlands, the United Kingdom, France, India, Switzerland, Brazil, Chile, Mexico, Colombia, Turkey, Spain, United Arab Emirates, Kuwait, Qatar, Russia, Japan, and the United States. The US, UK, Belgium and Paris restaurants are fully company-owned and operated, while all other international branches are franchises.

A common theme in all Le Pain Quotidien locations is a long, wooden "communal table".

== History ==
The first Le Pain Quotidien - Rue Dansaert, Brussels

Founder Alain Coumont opened Le Pain Quotidien on 26 October 1990 at 16 rue Dansaert in Brussels. As a young chef, Coumont was dissatisfied with the quality of bread available in Brussels, so he began making his own, mixing flour, water and salt into the familiar loaves of his childhood. He furnished the store with cabinets scoured from antique stores and a large table made of wood reclaimed from the floors of retired Belgian trains purchased at a local flea market: the first of Le Pain Quotidien's communal tables.

The first location in the United States opened on Madison Avenue in New York City in 1997.

By 2005, the founder was receiving 50 emails per day from people wanting to secure a franchise.

In 2011, the company had a public relations incident when a customer in New York City found a mouse in her salad.

In 2016, Doug Satzman became CEO of the U.S. operations and Vincent Herbert became global CEO.

In March 2018, Vincent Herbert resigned.

In December 2019, Cobepa, majority owned by Spoelberch, increased its stake in the company from 32% to 43% and the French group Norac Foods sold its 25% interest.

In May 2020, the parent company filed for insolvency in Belgium and the United States division filed for Chapter 11 bankruptcy protection. The same month the parent company signed a deal agreement with the New York-based Aurify Brands which would provide a bridge financing of $522,000 to continue the operations and ultimately acquiring all U.S. units for $3 million. Aurify Brands planned to reopen at least 35 units and to create 1,000 jobs.

In July 2023, the company collapsed into administration in the United Kingdom and shuttered all but one of its locations in the UK. By 2024, all locations in Hong Kong has also closed permanently.

The worldwide turnover for Le Pain Quotidien is 270 MEUR for 220 restaurants, of which 80% are franchised. The CEO Annick Van Overstraeten announces in 2025 the intention to open up to 100 restaurants in India.
