= The Ten Commandments of Nouvelle Cuisine =

Guidelines for nouvelle cuisine

The Ten Commandments of Nouvelle Cuisine aim to set general guidelines for cooking nouvelle cuisine. These commandments were published by the French food journalist Henri Gault. The commandments are as follows:

1. Thou shalt not overcook.
2. Thou shalt use fresh, quality products.
3. Thou shalt lighten thy menu.
4. Thou shalt not be systematically modernist.
5. Thou shalt nevertheless seek out what the new techniques can bring you.
6. Thou shalt avoid pickles, cured game meats, fermented foods, etc.
7. Thou shalt eliminate rich sauces.
8. Thou shalt not ignore dietetics.
9. Thou shalt not doctor up thy presentations.
10. Thou shalt be inventive.

== See also ==
- Haute cuisine
- Cuisine minceur
