= Philippe Rochat =

Swiss chef (1953–2015)

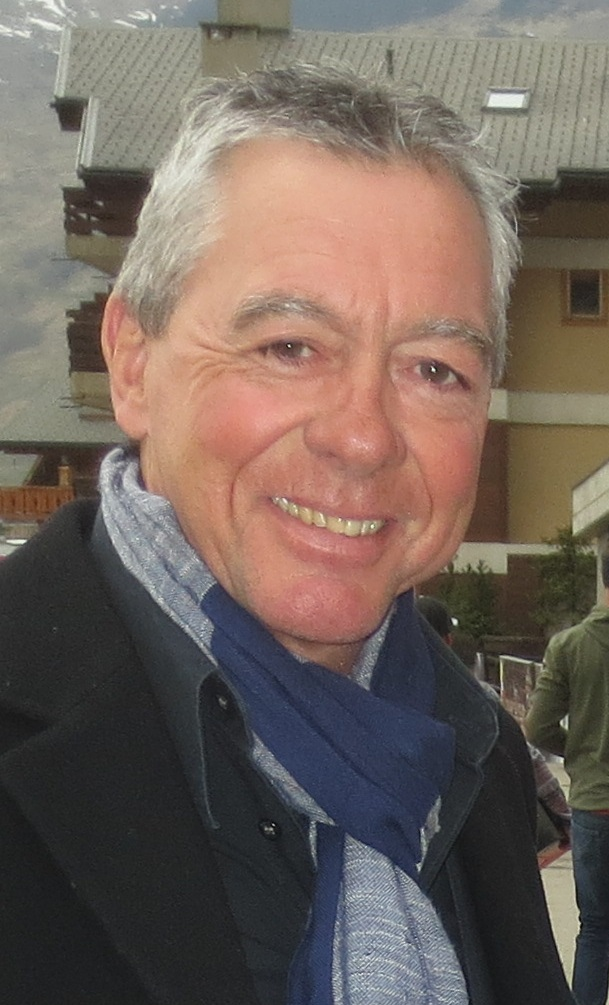
Philippe Rochat

Philippe Rochat (29 November 1953 – 8 July 2015) was a Swiss chef and the owner of the Restaurant de L'Hôtel de Ville in Crissier, Switzerland.

The restaurant, formerly owned by Frédy Girardet, won three Michelin Guide stars, and was voted 16th best in the world in Restaurant magazine's 50 Best Restaurants list in 2009.

Rochat's wife, marathon runner Franziska Rochat-Moser, died in 2002 in an avalanche.

Rochat died at the age of 61 on 8 July 2015. He fainted while riding his bicycle.
