= Saulieu =

- Commune
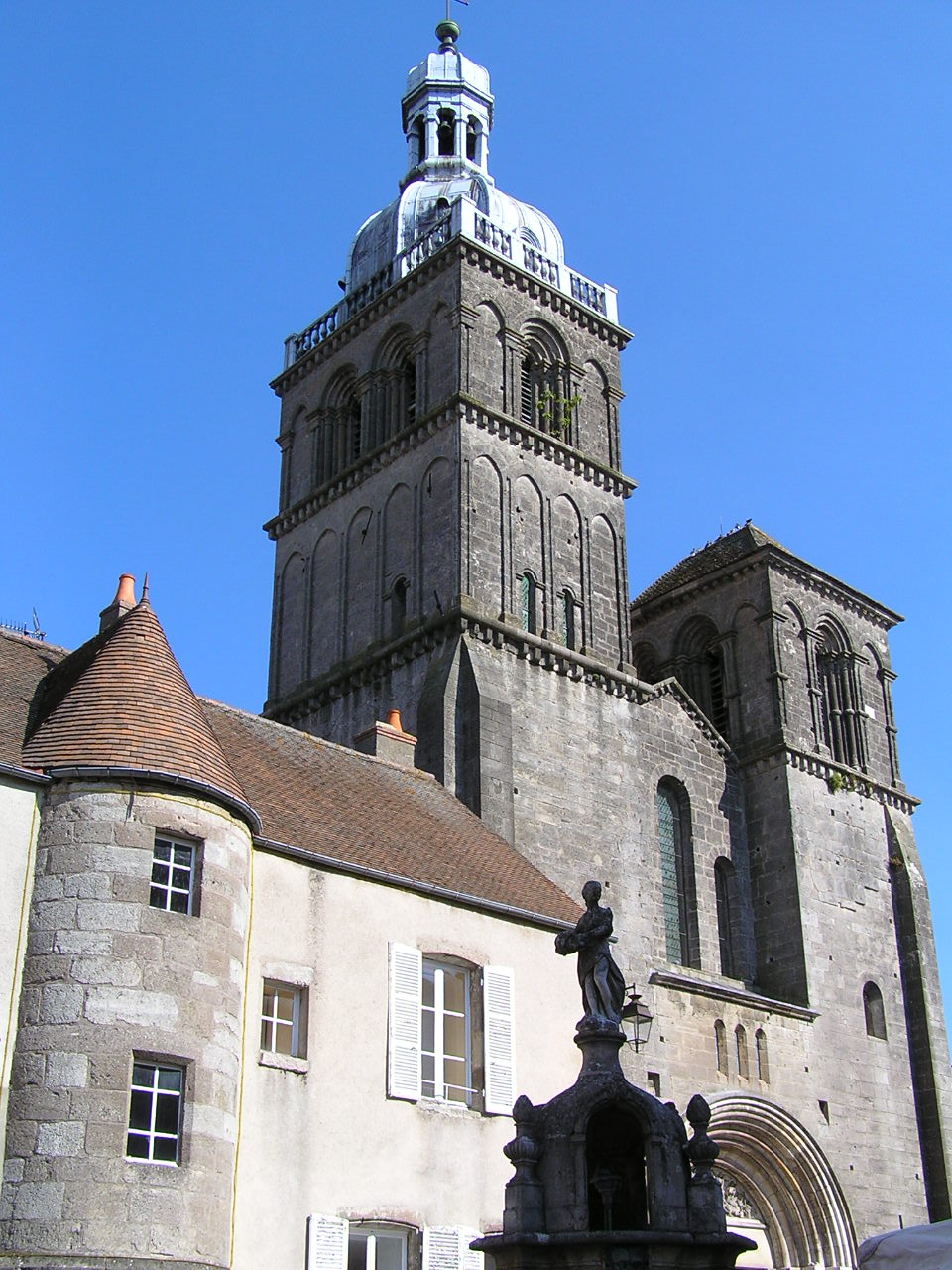
- Saint-Andoche basilica

- Coat of arms
- Location of Saulieu
- Location within France Location within Bourgogne-Franche-Comté
- Coordinates: 47°16′51″N 4°13′46″E
- Country: France
- Region: Bourgogne-Franche-Comté
- Department: Côte-d'Or
- Arrondissement: Montbard
- Canton: Semur-en-Auxois
- Intercommunality: CC Saulieu-Morvan

Government
  - Mayor (2020–2026): Martine Mazilly
- Area^{1}: 32.03 km^{2} (12.37 sq mi)
- Elevation: 545 m (1,788 ft)
- Highest elevation: 596 m (1,955 ft)
- Lowest elevation: 394 m (1,293 ft)
- Population (2023): 2,216
  - Density: 69.19/km^{2} (179.2/sq mi)
- Time zone: UTC+01:00 (CET)
  - Summer (DST): UTC+02:00 (CEST)
- INSEE/Postal code: 21584 /21210
- ^{1} French Land Register data, which excludes lakes, ponds, glaciers > 1 km^{2} (0.386 sq mi or 247 acres) and river estuaries.

Saulieu (French pronunciation: [soljø]) is a rural commune in the Côte-d'Or department in the Bourgogne-Franche-Comté region of central-east France. Its 2,413 inhabitants (in 2017) call themselves Sédélociens.

Capital of the Morvan, situated within Morvan Regional Natural Park, Saulieu lies 250 km southeast of Paris on the RN6 road.

== History ==
This walled town has existed since Roman times when it was known as Sidolocus (or Sedelocus), as seen on the tombs and engravings that can be found in the hills overlooking the modern town. Every Saturday morning a unique market is held in the square selling goods of many kinds.

== Church ==
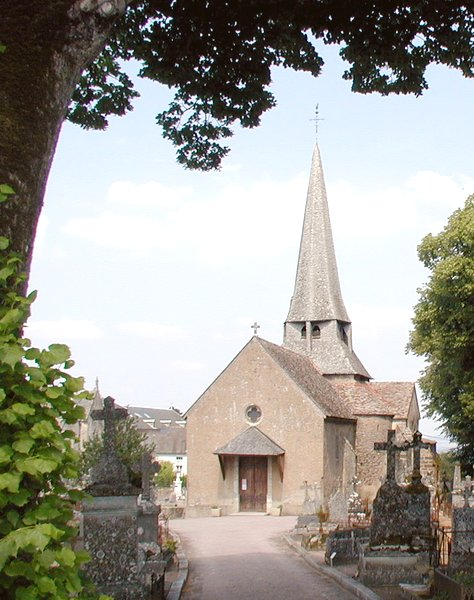
The 13th-century church of Saint-Saturnin

The Basilica of Saint Andoche, noted for its west portal and carved capitals depicting biblical stories and religious teachings, was founded as an abbey church in the 6th century. Rebuilt as a collegiate church in the 12th century, it became a Minor Basilica in 1919.

There are over 60 carved capitals in the basilica, several of which have narrative figures. Some of the capitals are the Flight into Egypt (Matthew 2:13-15), Balaam (Numbers 23-24), The Risen Christ (John 20:11-18; Matthew 28:1-10), Temptation of Christ (Mt 4:1-11; Mk 1:12-13; Lk 4:1-13) and the capital of the "Cockfight in the south arcade, fourth pier (facing the aisle)".

== Population ==
Historical population

Year	Pop.	±% p.a.
1836	3,023	—
1901	3,583	+0.26%
1936	3,121	−0.39%
1962	3,269	+0.18%
1968	3,303	+0.17%
1975	2,946	−1.62%
1982	3,084	+0.66%

Year	Pop.	±% p.a.
1990	2,917	−0.69%
1999	2,837	−0.31%
2007	2,616	−1.01%
2012	2,514	−0.79%
2017	2,413	−0.82%
2023	2,216	−1.41%

Source: EHESS and INSEE (1968–2023)

== Sights ==
- Saint Andoche Basilica, a Romanesque church built around 1130–1140.
- Tomb of Saint Andoche, reputed to be writer of the evangelistary of Charlemagne.
- Cemetery of the church of Saint Saturnin with Gallo-Roman graves.
- François Pompon regional museum.

== International relations ==
- Caprino Veronese, Italy
- Gau-Algesheim, Germany, since 1964.

== Personalities ==
- Yves Afonso, actor
- Bernard Loiseau, chef
- François Pompon, sculptor
- Claude Sallier, philologist and churchman

== See also ==
- Communes of the Côte-d'Or department
- Parc naturel régional du Morvan
