= La Maison Troisgros =

Restaurant in Lyon, France

Coordinates: 46.01032°N 3.99178°E

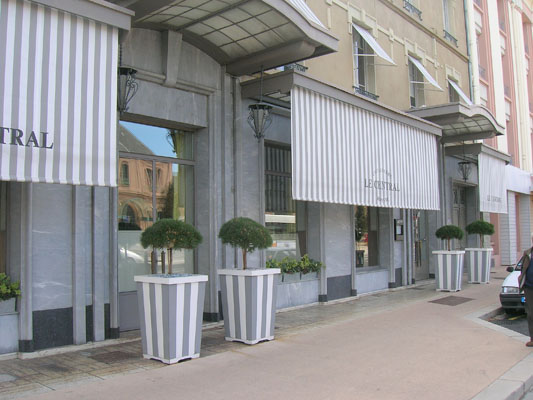
Café - Epicerie Le Central in Roanne

La Maison Troisgros is a Michelin Guide three-starred restaurant, named "Le Bois sans Feuilles" in Roanne, France northwest of the city of Lyon. Head chef, Michel Troisgros of the Troisgros family, runs the hotel-restaurant along with his wife, Marie-Pierre.

The original site of the Troisgros's restaurant-hotel, in Roanne, was bought by Michel's grandfather, Jean-Baptiste Troisgros, in 1930.

Michel is the cook and his wife Marie-Pierre looks after the house, the decor and the shop.

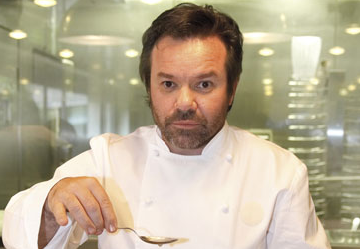
Michel Troisgros

The restaurant achieved the rank of 25th best in the world in the 2008 edition of The World's 50 Best Restaurants.

In 2023, the restaurant was ranked 6th in the world by La Liste, moving to 3rd place in 2024. The restaurant had previously been ranked in the top 10 in 2015 also.
