= Frédy Girardet =

Swiss chef

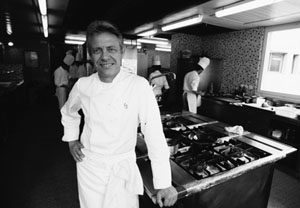
Girardet in 1982

Frédy Girardet (born 17 November 1936) is a Swiss chef who cooks in the French tradition. Often considered one of the greatest chefs of the 20th Century, his self-named restaurant Chez Girardet (now Restaurant de l'Hôtel de Ville) in Crissier, Switzerland (near Lausanne, Switzerland) earned three Michelin stars and before Girardet's retirement in 1996 was often called the greatest restaurant in the world.

== Biography ==
Girardet was born to Benjamin and Georgette Girardet in Lausanne, Switzerland. His father cooked for years in Hôtel Central Bellevue in Lausanne, before opening a bistro in Crissier, Switzerland, a small town nearby. Girardet was an athletic child, playing amateur association football (soccer). Although he apprenticed at Le Grand Chêne, a restaurant in Lausanne, his ambition was to become a professional soccer player.

During a wine-buying tour of Burgundy for his father's restaurant, a vintner took him to La Maison Troisgros in Roanne. Girardet describes the meal, his first at a renowned restaurant, as a spiritual experience that convinced him to become a chef. When his father died unexpectedly at age 56, he took over the bistro. Cooking originally in a classic style, he began to experiment with lighter and more innovative style, joining with his contemporaries to develop the emerging nouvelle cuisine movement.

== Cuisine ==
Girardet is known primarily for his nouvelle cuisine style. He avoids using flour in his sauces, thickening them instead with simmered meat stocks. By more modern standards he is considered a traditionalist. He is a critic of molecular cuisine, in particular its use of non-natural ingredients. In 1982 he published Les recettes originales de Girardet: La cuisine spontanée. In 1984 followed The Cuisine of Fredy Girardet (edited by food writer Narcisse Chamberlain), in French with English translation.

== Restaurant ==
Restaurant de l'Hôtel de Ville de Crissier was opened in 1971. Unlike many acclaimed chefs from the era, Girardet personally spent most of his time in the kitchen supervising the cuisine, rarely traveled, and avoided consultancies and endorsements. The restaurant was called by some the greatest restaurant in the world, and for his work there, Girardet was often called the world's greatest chef.

Girardet sold his restaurant in 1996, at age 60, to Philippe Rochat, who had worked under Girardet since 1980, and Rochat's wife Franziska Rochat-Moser. He then retired to the town of Féchy. Girardet grew bored after retiring, and had some friction with Rochat, who quickly regained the restaurant's three-star rating. Food writer Colman Andrews speculated that Girardet quit during the prime of his career after observing other chefs he knew, including his father, who were unable to sell when they wanted, and who eventually died early from the stress of running a restaurant.

Among Girardet's other understudies is Léa Linster.

== See also ==
- Swiss cuisine
