= Pierre Troisgros =

French restaurateur (1928–2020)

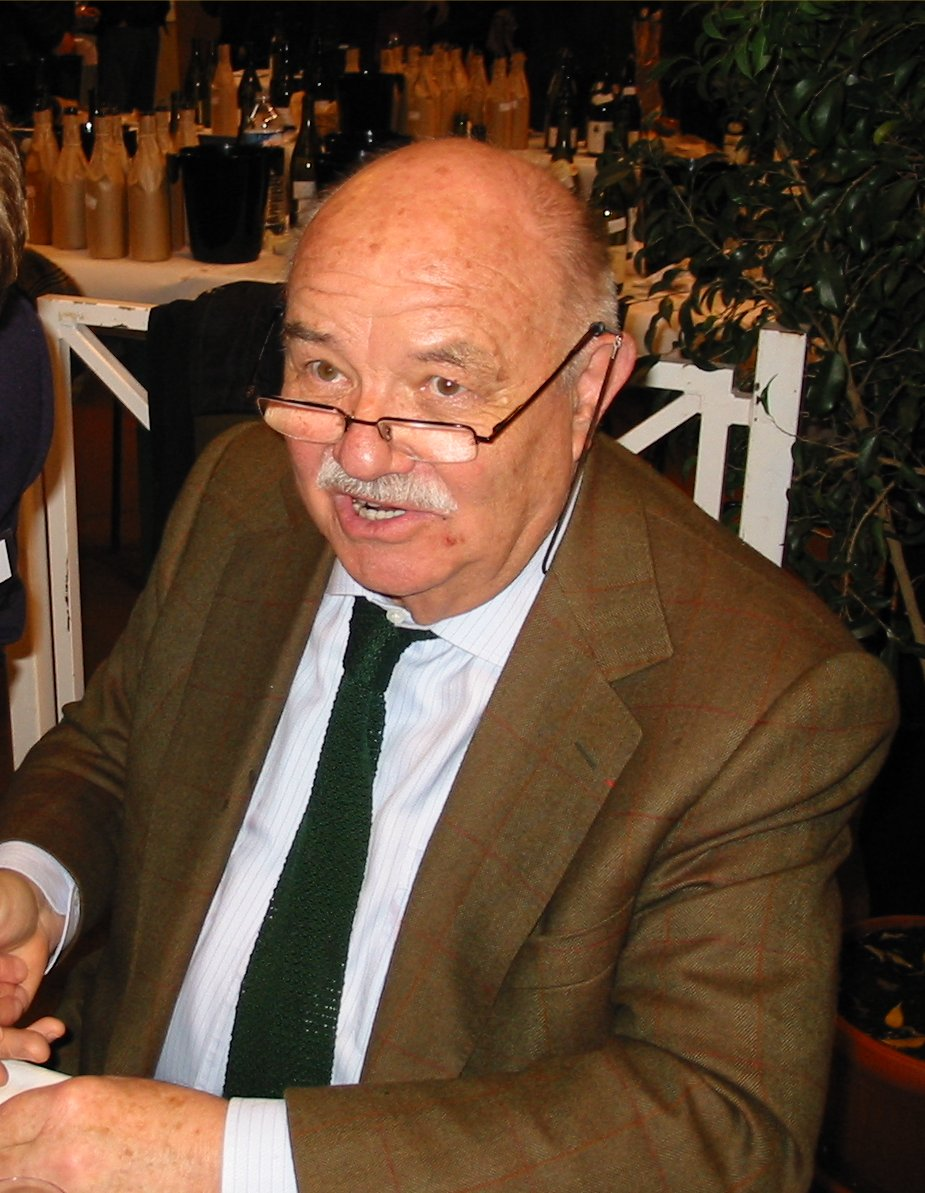
- Born: 3 September 1928; Chalon-sur-Saône, France
- Died: 23 September 2020 (aged 92); Le Coteau, France
- Occupations: Restaurant chef and owner
- Relatives: Troisgros family
- Culinary career
- Cooking style: Nouvelle cuisine

Pierre Troisgros (French pronunciation: [pjɛʁ tʁwaɡʁo]; 3 September 1928 – 23 September 2020) was a French chef and restaurateur, best known for his restaurant Frères Troisgros. Pierre Troisgros and his brother continued their father Jean-Baptiste Troisgros's restaurant Hôtel Moderne, where they invented "Escalope de saumon à l’oseille Troisgros," or salmon with sorrel sauce, which became their signature dish. At the time of his death, he had set a record by never losing his three Michelin stars once he was first awarded them. Stephen Harris for the Telegraph described him "the father of nouvelle cuisine."

== Career ==
His brother Jean Troisgros was two years older than him. He and his brother received their first cooking lessons from their mother. Pierre Troisgros and his brother completed an apprenticeship with renowned top chefs in Paris. In Paris, he refined his skills along with his brother at the restaurant Lucas Carton.

When they were called back to take over the family business in 1953, Pierre was in charge of cooking, and Jean oversaw the sauces. Their father oversaw service and the wine cellar. Together with his brother, he continued his father's restaurant Hôtel Moderne. In 1955, the country restaurant located in Roanne (Loire, Auvergne-Rhône-Alpes), won its first Michelin star. In 1957, the restaurant was renamed Les Frères Troisgros. Within ten years, it became the most popular restaurant in the region and soon it was one of the best known restaurants in France. In 1965, the restaurant, got its second star, and, in 1968, its third.

=== Nouvelle cuisine ===
One of the inventors of nouvelle cuisine, in the 1960s, Paul Bocuse, Alain Chapel, Jean and Pierre Troisgros, and Michel Guérard "disrupted restaurant culture... Breaking away from the long-established rules of French haute cuisine, the group pushed for food to look and taste more like the stuff it’s actually made from, to be leaner and lighter and brighter."

The New York Times says "the restaurant’s most famous dish was salmon with sorrel sauce (saumon à l’oseille). In the Troisgros kitchen the sauce was not thickened with starch but depended on well-reduced sauce ingredients and a touch of cream... the dish was cooked in a nonstick pan, noting that Mr. Troisgros was among the first chefs to use one." Troisgos stated at one point that "invention of the Teflon-coated pan that made the dish possible." He and his brother called their salmon dish "Escalope de saumon à l’oseille Troisgros," or salmon with sorrel sauce, and it involved cooking the salmon for 15 seconds on each side in a non-stick pan. The dish was initially received with hostility, but when Robert Courtine of Le Monde called it an "intelligent salmon," it afterwards went on to become their signature dish.

In 1972, the brothers were awarded by critics of the Gault Millau with the title "Best Restaurant in the World" award.

About her visit in the 1970s, Gael Greene wrote "Brother Pierre in his tall white toque sat playing gin rummy in the middle of the dining room, where the awed pilgrims left over from lunch still nibbled petit fours as we checked in." Early in his career, while visiting China, he picked up what would later be called the tasting menu, which he implemented in the restaurant in the 1970s.

Michel Troisgros joined the family business with his father in 1983. A book about his nouvelle cuisine and his brother's was published in 2012. In 2017, he had spent 86 of his 88 years in Roanne, but the family restaurant moved to Ouches in 2017. He set a record by never losing his three stars once he was first awarded them. After his death, Stephen Harris for the Telegraph went so far as to call him "the father of nouvelle cuisine," and that "today's chefs [in 2020] still work in his shadow.

== Personal life ==
Troisgros was father of Claude Troisgros, a famous restaurateur and TV presenter in Brazil. His son Michel married Marie-Pierre Troisgros, and their sons César and Léo are also cooks working at the family establishment.

On 23 September 2020, Troisgros died at home in Le Coteau near Roanne aged 92.
