= Relais & Châteaux =

Restaurant and hotel association

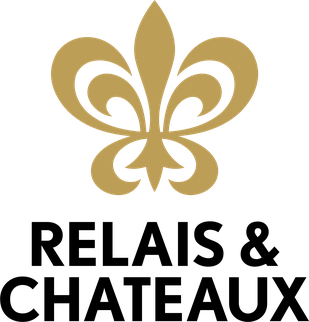
- Type: Trade association
- Industry: Hospitality
- Founded: 1954; 72 years ago
- Founder: Marcel Tilloy
- Headquarters: Paris, France
- Area served: 65 countries
- Members: 580 (2023)
- Website: relaischateaux.com

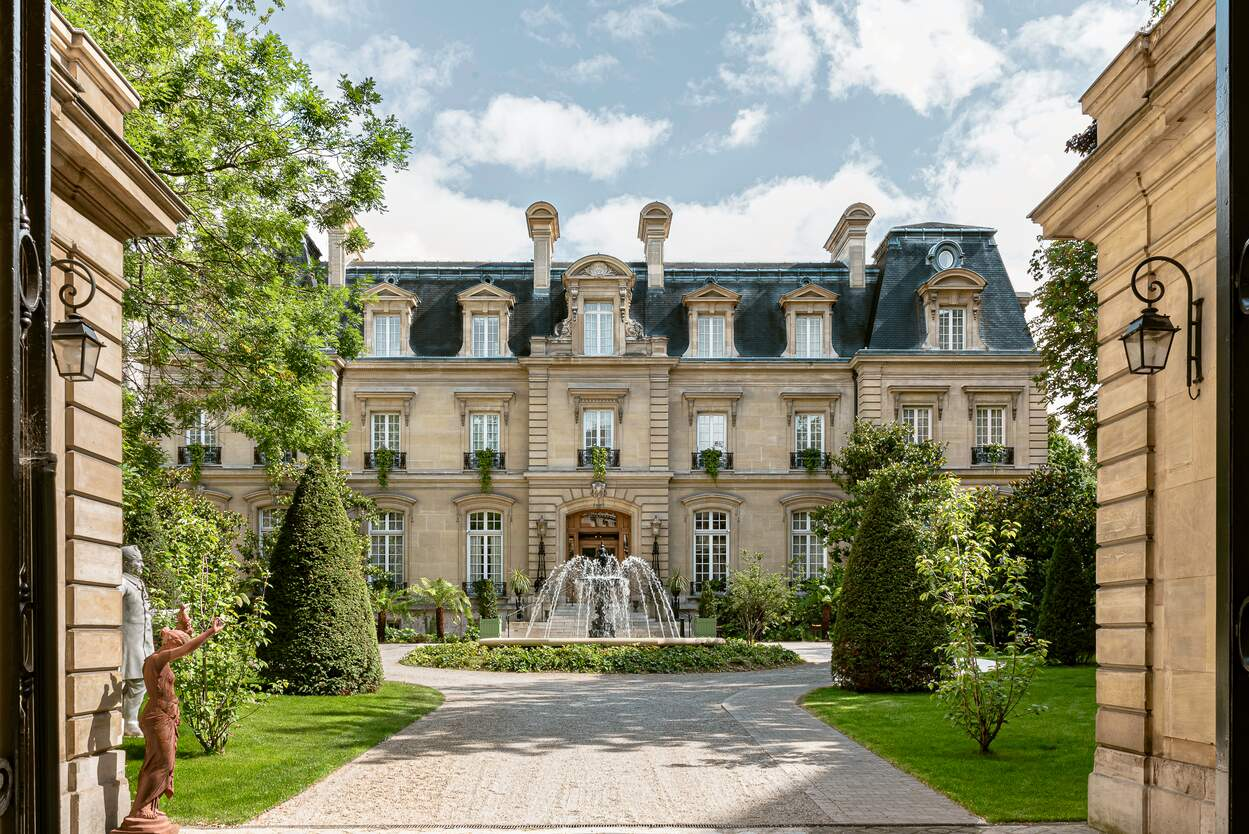
Saint James Paris, a Relais & Châteaux property in Paris, France

Relais & Châteaux is an association of individually owned and operated luxury hotels and restaurants. As of April 2023, the association had 580 members in 65 countries across five continents. Predominantly operating in Europe and North America, the association also has members in South America, Asia, Africa and Oceania. Governed by the 1901 Act of French law, the association was founded in 1954 and was initially known as Relais de Campagne. In 1975, it merged with Châteaux-Hôtels to form Relais & Châteaux.

== History ==
In 1954, Marcel and Nelly Tilloy, two music-hall artists who owned La Cardinale on the right bank of the Rhône River in France, joined forces with some hotelier friends to form the organization 'Les Relais de Campagne' (The Country Road Houses). They also created a road trip called 'Route du Bonheur' (Road to Happiness) along the Route Nationale 7 from Paris to Nice, where each of the founding properties appears as a stop along the road. By the early 1960s, establishments outside France had joined the association, including hotels in Belgium, Denmark, Germany, Italy, the Netherlands, Spain, Switzerland, and the United Kingdom.

In 1974, Relais de Campagne and Relais Gourmands merged with the Châteaux-Hôtels group to form Relais & Châteaux.

In 2009, Relais & Châteaux signed the Ethic Ocean charter to commit to serving sustainable seafood. It includes commitment to stop serving bluefin tuna, helping prevent the collapse of the stock in the North-East Atlantic Ocean and Mediterranean Sea, allowing them to replenish.

In 2013, Philippe Gombert was selected as the president of the association. During Gombert's governance, a manifesto for the association was presented at UNESCO in 2014, pledging to make a better world through food and hospitality. Through this manifesto, the association also presented twenty commitments.

In 2014, Relais & Châteaux presented this Vision with 20 commitments at UNESCO, pledging to preserve the world’s cuisines.

In 2016, its partnership with Slow Food began with the intention of fighting climate change and protecting biodiversity. By 2022, over 100 products from 30 countries have been approved to Slow Food’s Ark of Taste (a digital catalogue of near-extinct foods).

In 2019, a petition, signed by Relais & Châteaux chefs, and in partnership with nonprofit BLOOM association, was presented to the European Parliament ahead of a crucial vote to ban the controversial electric pulse trawling fishing technique. A ban was introduced in mid-2021.

In 2020, Relais & Châteaux chefs pledged to participate in ‘le bar en hiver’ (seabass in winter), and decided to stop serving seabass in February and March. The initiative, in partnership with Ethic Ocean, protected the threatened species during its critical breeding season, allowing stocks to replenish.

In 2022, Relais & Châteaux launched the first sustainability report aligned with the Sustainable Development Goals of the United Nations. The published report identifies 15 objectives for 2025 and 2030 across three pillars: Environmental Conservation, Sustainable Cuisine and Social & Societal Empowerment.

In January 2023, Laurent Gardinier succeeded Philippe Gombert to become the new president of Relais & Châteaux.

In November 2024, UNESCO and the Relais & Châteaux Association announced the signature of a partnership agreement to develop and implement joint projects supporting the sustainable conservation and use of biological diversity through the world’s hospitality and culinary traditions and savoir-faire. UNESCO supports the Association's 12 Commitments to Sustainability, In Harmony with All Life on Earth, designed to pursue three major missions: preserve the world’s hospitality and culinary traditions, contribute to the protection and development of biodiversity, take daily action for a more humane world.

== Operations ==
Relais & Châteaux is known for its strict admission standards. In addition to luxurious facilities, members must have special features distinguishing them from chain hotels. Most of them are historic landmarks such as castles, manor houses, or townhouses in idyllic settings and offering exquisite haute cuisine.

Relais & Châteaux is led by a President, who is elected every five years by members of the association and can hold office for a maximum of two terms. Members of the Executive Committee and the Delegate Committee form a Board of Directors, which meets under the direction of the President to approve the admission of new members, validate strategic decisions and approve implementation plans conducted by the Management Team as services for its global network of properties, which is divided into 20 delegations.

== Presidents ==
- 2023–present: Laurent Gardinier
- 2013–2022: Philippe Gombert
- 2005–2013: Jaume Tapies
- 1986–2005: Régis Bulot
- 1971–1986: Joseph Olivereau
