= Alain Chapel =

French chef (1937–1990)

- Born: 30 December 1937; Lyon, France
- Died: 10 July 1990 (aged 52); Avignon, France
- Education: Fernand Point
- Culinary career
- Cooking style: Nouvelle cuisine
- Previous restaurants
- Hotel Alain Chapel, Mionnay
- Website: http://www.alainchapel.fr (discontinued)

Alain Chapel (French pronunciation: [alɛ̃ ʃapɛl]; 30 December 1937 – 10 July 1990) was a French chef, credited with being one of the originators of nouvelle cuisine. He earned three Michelin stars at his eponymous restaurant Maison Alain Chapel.

== Early life ==
Chapel was born in Lyon, the son of Maître d' Charles and his wife Eva. At the outbreak of World War II, the family moved to the village of Mionnay 12 miles outside the city, where his father opened a bistro called La Mere Charles in an old coaching inn surrounded by lush gardens. There Alain Chapel received his first training.

== Career ==
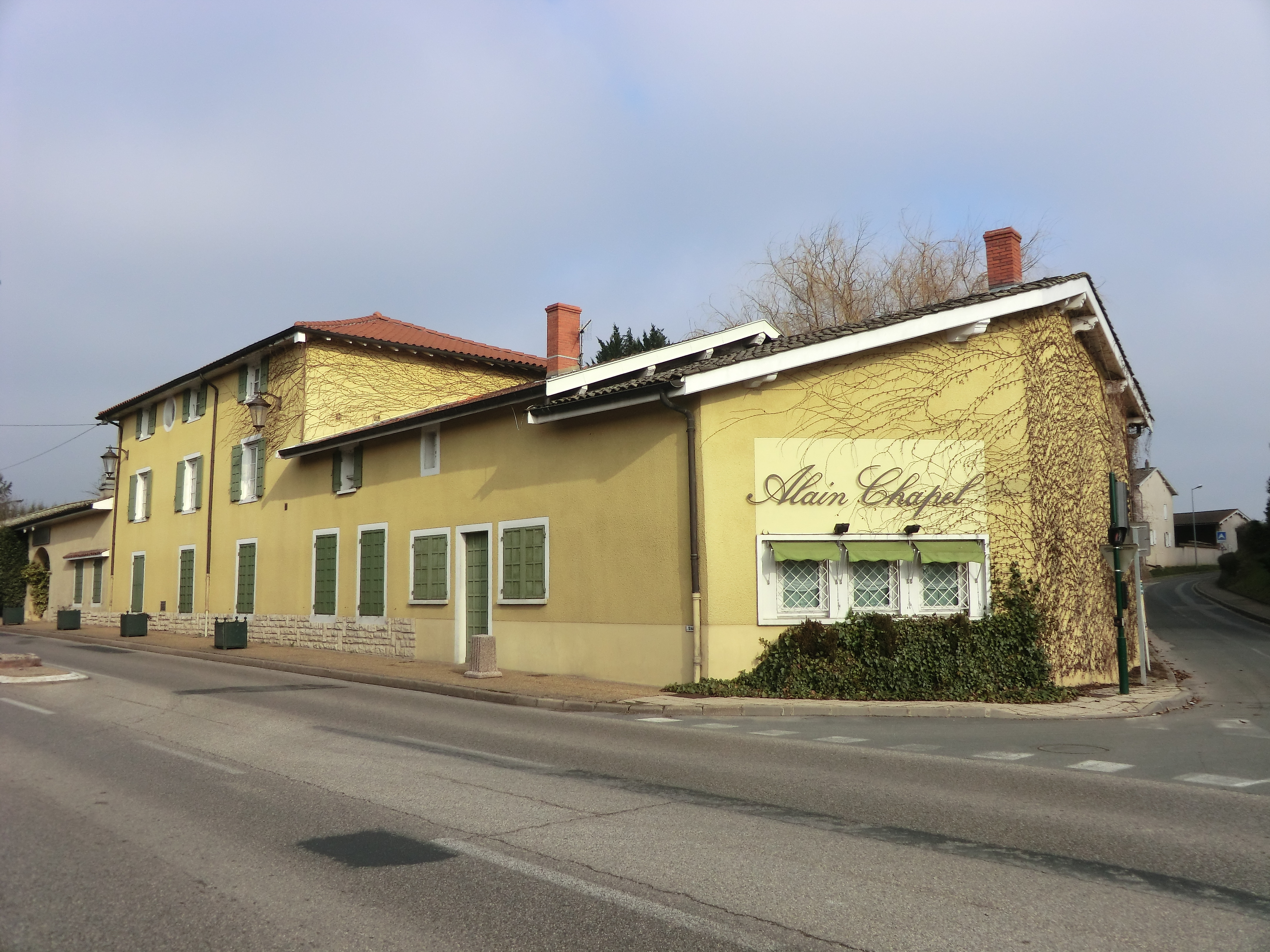
Former restaurant of Alain Chapel in Mionnay

In the 1960s, Paul Bocuse, Alain Chapel, Jean and Pierre Troisgros, and Michel Guérard "disrupted restaurant culture... Breaking away from the long-established rules of French haute cuisine, the group pushed for food to look and taste more like the stuff it's actually made from, to be leaner and lighter and brighter."

Alain Chapel eventually returned to the family bistro which was then upgraded to a restaurant. In 1967 it was awarded its first Michelin star. After taking over the restaurant in 1970 on the death of his father, he converted the inn to a hotel and renamed it in 1980 in his own name. In 1973, Chapel gained his third Michelin star, then one of only 19 restaurants all in France which had ever then gained the honour.

Chapel's signature dishes included stuffed calves' ears with fried parsley, truffle-stuffed chicken tightly enveloped in a pork bladder and cooked in a rich chicken broth. Food critic Craig Claiborne writing for The New York Times in 1977 described Chapel's gateau de foies blonds as "his ultimate triumph" and "one of the absolute cooking glories of this generation". According to the Gault Millau Guide to France: "A meal at Chapel's restaurant was like a symphony."

Throughout the rest of his life, the establishment retained all three of its Michelin stars. The speed of transformation and the elaborate cuisine turned the village of Mionnay into a culinary landmark on any serious gastronomic tour of France. The attraction was also as great for young chefs, who sought the opportunity to work with Chapel – these included Michel Roux Jr.

== Death and succession ==
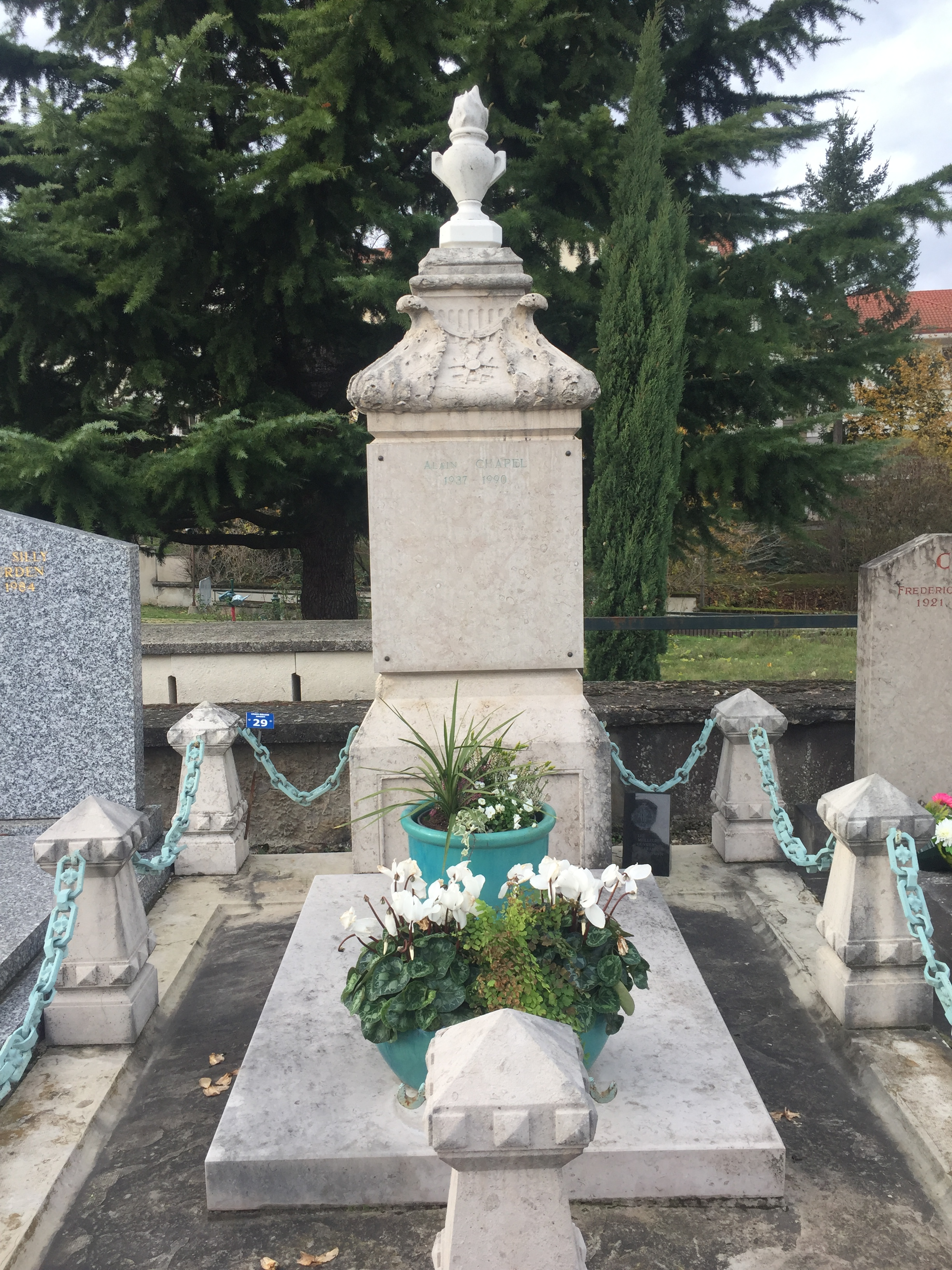
Grave of Alain Chapel

Chapel died of a stroke in 1990, leaving his wife Suzanne, and two sons, David and Romain. Under chef Philippe Jousse, and then Chapel's son Romain, the restaurant maintained two Michelin stars until closing in 2012.

He is buried in Croix-Rousse cemetery in Lyon.
