= Eugénie-les-Bains =

- Commune
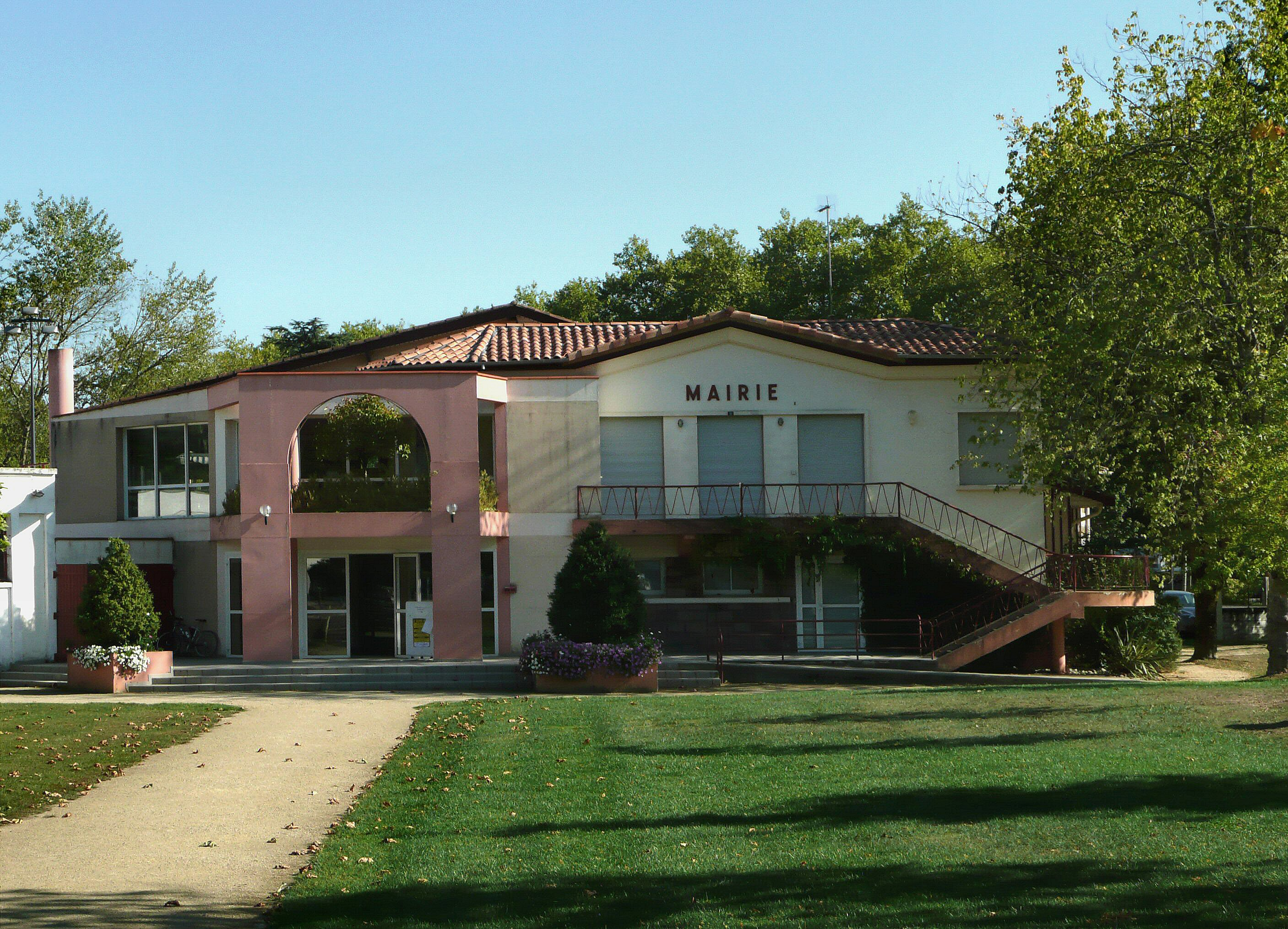
- Town hall

- Coat of arms
- Location of Eugénie-les-Bains
- Location within France Location within Nouvelle-Aquitaine
- Coordinates: 43°41′49″N 0°22′38″W
- Country: France
- Region: Nouvelle-Aquitaine
- Department: Landes
- Arrondissement: Mont-de-Marsan
- Canton: Adour Armagnac
- Intercommunality: Aire-sur-l'Adour

Government
  - Mayor (2020–2026): Philippe Brethes
- Area^{1}: 11 km^{2} (4.2 sq mi)
- Elevation: 85 m (279 ft)
- Highest elevation: 159 m (522 ft)
- Lowest elevation: 82 m (269 ft)
- Population (2023): 498
  - Density: 45/km^{2} (120/sq mi)
- Demonym: Eugénois.e
- Time zone: UTC+01:00 (CET)
  - Summer (DST): UTC+02:00 (CEST)
- INSEE/Postal code: 40097 /40320
- ^{1} French Land Register data, which excludes lakes, ponds, glaciers > 1 km^{2} (0.386 sq mi or 247 acres) and river estuaries.

Eugénie-les-Bains (French pronunciation: [øʒeni le bɛ̃]; Occitan: Las Aigas) is a commune in the Landes department, Nouvelle-Aquitaine, southwestern France. It was created in 1861 from part of Saint-Loubouer. It takes its name from Empress Eugénie, spouse of Napoleon III.

Eugénie-les-Bains is best known for housing a spa resort and three restaurants, all belonging to chef Michel Guérard, inventor of cuisine minceur.

== Population ==
Historical population
Year	Pop.	±% p.a.
1968	452	—
1975	392	−2.01%
1982	408	+0.57%
1990	467	+1.70%
1999	507	+0.92%
2007	484	−0.58%
2012	427	−2.47%
2017	446	+0.87%
2023	498	+1.86%
Source: INSEE

== See also ==
- Communes of the Landes department
