= Michel Guérard =

French chef (1933–2024)

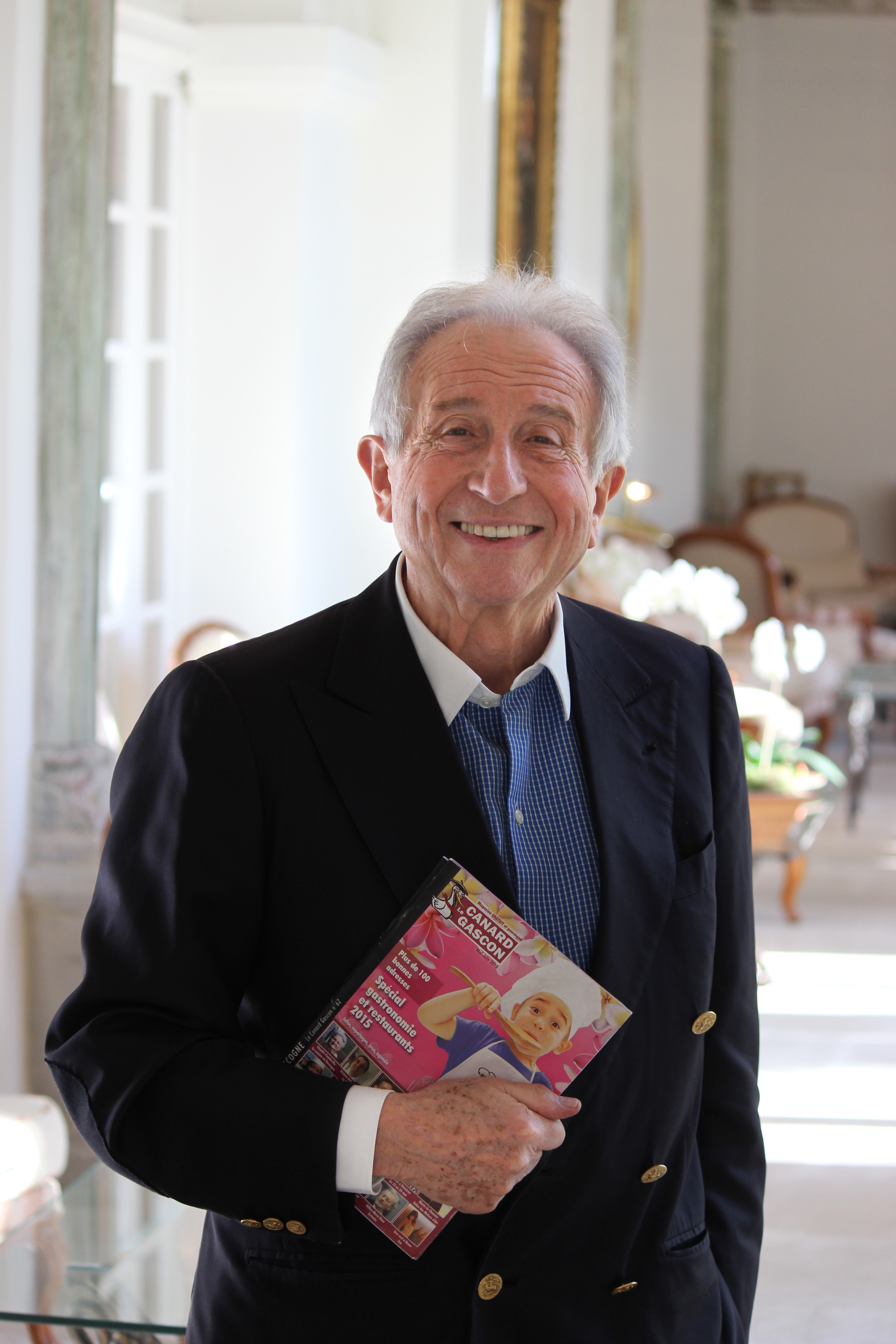
- Michel Guérard at Eugénie-les-Bains in 2016
- Born: Michel Robert-Guérard; 27 March 1933; Vétheuil, France
- Died: 19 August 2024 (aged 91); Eugénie-les-Bains, France
- Education: Lycée Pierre-Corneille
- Honours: Honours
- Culinary career
- Cooking style: Cuisine minceur; nouvelle cuisine
- Website: https://valeurnette.fr/michel-guerard-fortune/

Michel Robert-Guérard (French: [miʃɛl ɡeʁaʁ]; 27 March 1933 – 19 August 2024), known as Michel Guérard, was a French chef, author, one of the founders of nouvelle cuisine and the inventor of cuisine minceur.

== Early life and education ==
Michel Guérard was born in 1933 in the Paris suburb of Vétheuil. At age six, World War II broke out, and he was raised just outside Rouen with his grandmother and then his mother. In town, his mother ran the family butcher shop after his father was drafted. He had the "kind of French country childhood that involved wading into streams barefoot to catch slippery trout with his hands, but also Nazi interrogations regarding the location of his family’s cows." After liberation in 1944, he had an "Escoffier-style feast" at a family friend's home, helping inspire him to stop studying science in favor of apprenticing as a cook. He also learned cooking from his mother and grandmother.

== Career ==
He related that "watching his grandmother bake pastry inspired him to become an apprentice, aged 14, at Kléber Alix's patisserie in Mantes-La-Jolie." He then learned "palace cuisine" at Paris's Hôtel de Crillon, later going on to become the establishment's head pastry chef at the age of 25. He also cooked at Le Lido and Maxim's, and in 1958 won the Meilleur Ouvrier de France Patisserie, while working as a pastry chef at the Hôtel de Crillon.

In the late 1960s, he was working at a small restaurant in Asnières-sur-Seine in Paris, where the New York Times says he "almost single-handedly invented no[u]velle cuisine." In the 1960s, along with Paul Bocuse, Alain Chapel, and Jean and Pierre Troisgros, "Guérard was a nouvelle cuisine pioneer who... disrupted restaurant culture... Breaking away from the long-established rules of French haute cuisine, the group pushed for food to look and taste more like the stuff it’s actually made from, to be leaner and lighter and brighter."

In Paris suburbs in 1965, he opened his first restaurant Le Pot au Feu. It earned two Michelin stars. Le Pot-au-Feu in 1967 earned Guérard his first star in the Michelin Guide. The restaurant gained a second star in 1971, and was successful until it was compulsorily acquired for the purposes of a road-widening.

He operated a restaurant Hélène Darroze at the Connaught hotel in Mayfair.

=== Spa resort and cuisine minceur ===
In the village of Eugenie-les-Bains, he owned a 16-hectare farm along with his wife Christine, located on the spa where Empress Eugenie spent her summers. At the location, Les Pres D'Eugenie is his restaurant, located in the original Les Pres D'Eugenie Hotel opened in 1862.

In 1972 Guérard met Christine Barthelemy, the daughter of the founder of the Biotherm range and the owner of a chain of spas and hotels. They married, and in 1974 he moved with her to Eugénie-les-Bains, where she was running one of her family's smaller, less successful spas. They restored the buildings, and Guérard invented a style of food, cuisine minceur, a form of healthy cooking, to cater to health-conscious Parisians. Guerard stated that he created "great slimming cuisine" when he moved to Eugénie in 1974, an area where patients with metabolic diseases used its hot springs. Guerard wanted cuisine that was more appealing than diet food but low in extra fat, sugar, and salt, saying he "realized the extent of despair towards food" that overweight patients at the spa were facing.

SF Moma says "a vanguard of nouvelle cuisine, Michel Guérard was part of the radical shift towards lighter, delicate French cooking– a break from traditional techniques and reliance on heavy, rich sauces." On 9 February 1976, he was featured on the cover of TIME with a cartoon of Guerard, then 42, and the line "The new gourmet law: hold the butter." After first winning three Michelin stars for his Les Prés d’Eugénie restaurant in 1974, 1975, and 1977, he began receiving steady three Michelin stars for his restaurant around 1980. At one point, his restaurant at Les Prés d’Eugénie was awarded three Michelin stars for forty years consecutively, starting in 1977.

In 1977 his main restaurant received three Michelin stars, and all his properties in Eugénie have been very successful, transforming the tiny village into a significant tourist destination.

His book Eat Well And Stay Slim, published by Frances Lincoln, included cuisine minceur.

In 1983 Christine and Michel purchased the Château de Bachen, replanting the vineyards, and producing their first harvest in 1988.

In 1992, his other two new hotels included The Couvent des Herbes. Guerard on the property runs, according to The Age in 2008, [a] "luxury hotel, a gourmet bistro, Guerard's three-star restaurant, boutique lodgings and, most recently, La Ferme Thermale d'Eugenie, one of France's most elegant spas." In 1992, he also ran a vineyard, newly formed, which produced 37,000 bottles of his Baron de Bachen label annually. At the location, the couple has a cooking school for hobby chefs. They also in 2013 opened a training center for professional cooks. In 2016, Guerard and his family ran 21 spas and employed around 2000 people.

== Personal life and death ==
Guerard and his wife had two daughters. They lived at Château de Bachen, where they had a large collection of original French paintings. The house has a mile of grapevines.

On 19 August 2024, it was announced that Guérard had died overnight at his home, aged 91.

== Restaurants ==
At the time of his death he and Christine Guérard owned three restaurants in Eugénie-les-Bains:

- Les Prés d'Eugénie. Part of the main spa hotel, this restaurant serves cuisine gourmande, and has since 1977 received three stars in the Michelin Guide.

== Bibliography ==
- La grande cuisine minceur, with Alain Coumont, Éditions Robert Laffont, Paris, 1976.
- La cuisine gourmande, Éditions Robert Laffont, Paris, 1978.
- Petit almanach des inventeurs improbables et méconnus, with Jean-Paul Plantive, Ginkgo éditeur, 2003.
- L'almanach des petits mestiers improbables, with Jean-Paul Plantive, Ginkgo éditeur, 2004.
- Petit almanach des plantes improbables et merveilleuses, with Jean-Paul Plantive, Ginkgo éditeur, 2005.
- La Cuisine très facile, Recettes pour débutants ou maladroits, Ginkgo éditeur, 2006.

== Honours ==
- Chevalier of the Légion d'honneur
- Chevalier of the Ordre des Arts et des Lettres
- Chevalier of the Ordre national du Mérite
- Chevalier of the Ordre du Mérite agricole
- Prix Eckart-Witzigmann
- Chevalier of the Ordre des Palmes académiques
