= List of Michelin 3-star restaurants =

Michelin stars are a rating system used by the red Michelin Guide to grade restaurants on their quality. The guide was originally developed in 1900 to show French drivers where local amenities such as restaurants and mechanics were. The rating system was first introduced in 1926 as a single star, with the second and third stars introduced in 1933. According to the Guide, one star signifies "a very good restaurant", two stars are "excellent cooking that is worth a detour", and three stars mean "exceptional cuisine that is worth a special journey". The listing of starred restaurants is updated once per year.

== Summary ==
The 2025 Michelin Guides list 156 restaurants with 3 Michelin stars:

Countries/Regions by number of 3-star restaurants:
Rank	Country/Region	Number
1	§ France (incl. Monaco)	31
2	§ Japan	20
3	§ Spain	16
3	§ United States	16
5	§ Italy	13
5	§ China	13
7	§ Germany	12
8	§ United Kingdom	10
9	§ Switzerland	5
10	§ Denmark	3
10	§ Singapore	3
10	§ Taiwan	3
13	§ Austria	2
13	§ Belgium	2
13	§ Brazil	2
13	§ Norway	2
13	§ United Arab Emirates	2
13	§ Thailand	2
19	§ Netherlands	1
19	§ Slovenia	1
19	§ South Korea	1
19	§ Sweden	1

== List of Michelin 3-star restaurants by country ==
=== Austria ===
Michelin 3-star restaurants in Austria
Restaurant	Chef(s)	Location	Awarded since
Restaurant Amador	Juan Amador	Vienna	2019
Steirereck im Stadtpark	Heinz Reitbauer	Vienna	2025

=== Belgium ===
Michelin 3-star restaurants in Belgium
Restaurant	Chef(s)	Location	Awarded since
Boury	Tim Boury	Roeselare	2022
Zilte	Viki Geunes	Antwerp	2021

=== Brazil ===
Michelin 3-star restaurants in Brazil
Restaurant	Chef(s)	Location	Awarded since
Evvai	Luiz Filipe Souza	São Paulo	2026
Tuju	Ivan Ralston	São Paulo	2026

=== China ===
Michelin 3-star restaurants in China
Restaurant	Chef(s) / Owner(s)	Location	Awarded since
8½ Otto e Mezzo Bombana	Umberto Bombana and Keith Yam Ka Lok	Hong Kong	2012
Amber	Richard Ekkebus	Hong Kong	2025
Caprice	Guillaume Galliot	Hong Kong	2019 (2010–13)
Chao Shang Chao	Zhang Yifeng	Beijing	2024
Forum Restaurant	Wong Lung To	Hong Kong	2020
Jade Dragon	Kelvin Au Yeung	Macau	2019
Robuchon au Dôme	Julien Tongourian	Macau	2009
Sushi Shikon	Yoshiharu Kakinuma	Hong Kong	2014
T'ang Court	Kwong Wai Keung	Hong Kong	2016
Ta Vie	Hideaki Sato	Hong Kong	2023
Tai'an Table (泰安門)	Stefan Stiller	Shanghai	2022
Xin Rong Ji	Zhang Yong	Beijing	2020
Xin Rong Ji	Zhang Yong	Chengdu	2027

=== Denmark ===
Michelin 3-star restaurants in Denmark
Restaurant	Chef(s)	Location	Awarded since
Geranium	Rasmus Kofoed	Copenhagen	2016
Jordnær	Eric Vildgaard	Gentofte	2024
Kadeau Copenhagen	Nicolai Nørregaard	Copenhagen	2026

=== France & Monaco ===
Michelin 3-star restaurants in France (includes Monaco)
Restaurant	Chef(s)	Location	Awarded since
Alléno Paris au Pavillon Ledoyen	Yannick Alléno	Paris 8^{e}	2002
AM par Alexandre Mazzia	Alexandre Mazzia	Marseille	2021
Arpège	Alain Passard	Paris 7^{e}	1996
Auberge du Vieux Puits	Gilles Goujon	Fontjoncouse	2010
Christopher Coutanceau	Christopher Coutanceau	La Rochelle	2025 (2020-2022)
Épicure	Arnaud Faye	Paris 8^{e}	2009
Flocons de Sel	Emmanuel Renaut	Megève	2012
Kei	Kei Kobayashi	Paris 1^{e}	2020
L'Assiette Champenoise	Arnaud Lallement	Tinqueux	2014
L'Oustau de Baumanière	Glenn Viel	Les Baux-de-Provence	2020 (1954–1989)
La Marine	Alexandre Couillon	L'Herbaudière	2023
La Table du Castellet	Fabien Ferré	Le Castellet	2024 (2018-2022)
La Vague d'Or - Cheval Blanc St-Tropez	Arnaud Donckele	Saint-Tropez	2013
La Villa Madie	Dimitri Droisneau	Cassis	2022
Le 1947 à Cheval Blanc	Yannick Alléno and Gérard Barbin	Courchevel 1850	2017
Le Cinq	Christian Le Squer	Paris 8^{e}	2016 (1934 & 03-06)
Le Clos des Sens	Laurent Petit	Annecy	2019
Le Coquillage	Hugo Roellinger	Saint-Méloir-des-Ondes	2025
Le Gabriel - La Réserve Paris	Jérôme Banctel	Paris 8^{e}	2024
Le Louis XV - Alain Ducasse à l'Hôtel de Paris	Dominique Lory and Emmanuel Pilon	Monte Carlo, Monaco	2003 (1990-96 & 98-00)
Le Petit Nice	Gérald Passedat	Marseille	2008
Le Pré Catelan	Frédéric Anton	Paris 16^{e}	2007
Les Morainières	Michaël Arnoult	Jongieux	2026
Les Prés d'Eugénie - Michel Guérard	Michel Guérard	Eugénie-les-Bains	1977
Maison Lameloise	Éric Pras	Chagny	2007 (1979–2004)
Mirazur	Mauro Colagreco	Menton	2019
Pic	Anne-Sophie Pic	Valence	2007 (1934-39 & 73-94)
Pierre Gagnaire	Pierre Gagnaire	Paris 8^{e}	1998
Plénitude - Cheval Blanc Paris	Arnaud Donckele	Paris 1^{e}	2022
Restaurant Marcon	Régis and Jacques Marcon	Saint-Bonnet-le-Froid	2005
Troisgros - Le Bois sans Feuilles	César Troisgros	Ouches	1968

=== Germany ===
Michelin 3-star restaurants in Germany
Restaurant	Chef(s)	Location	Awarded since
ES:SENZ	Edip Sigl	Grassau	2024
Jan	Jan Hartwig	Munich	2023
L. A. Jordan	Daniel Schimkowitsch	Deidesheim	2026
Restaurant Bareiss	Claus-Peter Lumpp	Baiersbronn	2008
Restaurant Haerlin	Christoph Rüffer	Hamburg	2025
Rutz	Marco Müller	Berlin	2020
schanz. restaurant.	Thomas Schanz	Piesport	2022
Schwarzwaldstube	Torsten Michel	Baiersbronn	2021(1993–20)
The Table Kevin Fehling	Kevin Fehling	Hamburg	2016
Tohru in der Schreiberei	Tohru Nakamura	Munich	2025
Victor's Fine Dining by Christian Bau	Christian Bau	Perl	2006
Waldhotel Sonnora	Clemens Rambichler	Dreis	2000

=== Italy ===
Michelin 3-star restaurants in Italy
Restaurant	Chef(s)	Location	Awarded since
Atelier Moessmer Norbert Niederkofler	Norbert Niederkofler	Brunico	2024
Casa Perbellini 12 Apostoli	Giancarlo Perbellini	Verona	2025
Da Vittorio	Vittorio Cerea	Brusaporto	2010
Dal Pescatore	Nadia Santini	Canneto sull'Oglio	1996
Enoteca Pinchiorri	Annie Féolde, Italo Bassi, and Riccardo Monco	Florence	2004(1993–95)
Enrico Bartolini al Mudec	Enrico Bartolini	Milan	2020
La Pergola	Heinz Beck	Rome	2006
La Rei Natura by Michelangelo Mammoliti	Michelangelo Mammoliti	Piedmont	2026
Le Calandre	Massimiliano Alajmo	Rubano	2003
Osteria Francescana	Massimo Bottura	Modena	2012
Piazza Duomo	Enrico Crippa	Alba	2013
Reale	Niko Romito	Castel di Sangro	2014
Villa Crespi	Antonino Cannavacciuolo	Orta San Giulio	2023

=== Japan ===
Michelin 3-star restaurants in Japan
Restaurant	Chef(s)	Location	Awarded since
Azabu Kadowaki	Toshiya Kadowaki	Tokyo	2020
Gion Sasaki	Hiroshi Sasaki	Kyoto	2020
Hajime	Hajime Yoneda	Osaka	2018 (2010–2012)
Harutaka	Harutaka Takahashi	Tokyo	2024
Hyotei	Yoshihiro Takahashi	Kyoto	2010
Isshisoden Nakamura	Motokazu Nakamura	Kyoto	2011
Joël Robuchon	Kenichiro Sekiya	Tokyo	2008
Kagurazaka Ishikawa	Hideki Ishikawa	Tokyo	2009
Kanda	Hiroyuki Kanda	Tokyo	2008
Kashiwaya Osaka Senriyama	Hideaki Matsuo	Osaka	2011
Kikunoi Honten	Yoshihiro Murata	Kyoto	2010
L'Effervescence	Shinobu Namae	Tokyo	2021
L'Osier	Olivier Chaignon	Tokyo	2019 (2008–2010)
Miyamaso	Hisato Nakahigashi	Kyoto	2026
Mizai	Hitoshi Ishihara	Kyoto	2014 (2010–2012)
Myojaku	Hidetoshi Nakamura	Tokyo	2026
Ryugin	Seiji Yamamoto	Tokyo	2012
Quintessence	Shuzo Kishida	Tokyo	2008
Sazenka	Tomoya Kawada	Tokyo	2021
Taian	Hitoshi Takahata	Osaka	2011

=== Netherlands ===
Michelin 3-star restaurants in the Netherlands
Restaurant	Chef(s)	Location	Awarded since
De Librije	Nelson Tanate	Zwolle	2004

=== Norway ===
Michelin 3-star restaurants in Norway
Restaurant	Chef(s)	Location	Awarded since
Maaemo	Esben Holmboe Bang	Oslo	2016
Re-Naa	Sven Erik Renaa	Stavanger	2024

=== Singapore ===
Michelin 3-star restaurants in Singapore
Restaurant	Chef(s)	Location	Awarded since
Les Amis	Sébastien Lepinoy	Singapore	2019
Odette	Julien Royer	Singapore	2019
Zén	Björn Frantzén	Singapore	2021

=== Slovenia ===
Michelin 3-star restaurants in Slovenia
Restaurant	Chef(s)	Location	Awarded since
Hiša Franko	Ana Roš	Kobarid	2023

=== South Korea ===
Michelin 3-star restaurants in South Korea
Restaurant	Chef(s)	Location	Awarded since
Mingles	Mingoo Kang	Seoul	2025

=== Spain ===
Michelin 3-star restaurants in Spain
Restaurant	Chef(s)	Location	Awarded since
Àbac	Jordi Cruz	Barcelona	2018
Akelarre	Pedro Subijana	San Sebastián	2007
Aponiente	Ángel León	El Puerto de Santa María	2018
Arzak	Juan Mari Arzak and Elena Arzak	San Sebastián	1989
Atrio	Toño Pérez	Cáceres	2023
Azurmendi	Eneko Atxa	Larrabetzu	2013
Casa Marcial	Nacho Manzano	Arriondas	2025
Cocina Hermanos Torres	Sergio and Javier Torres	Barcelona	2023
Disfrutar	Oriol Castro, Mateu Casañas and Eduard Xatruch	Barcelona	2024
DiverXO	David Muñoz	Madrid	2014
El Celler de Can Roca	Joan Roca	Girona	2010
El Cenador de Amós	Jesús Sánchez	Villaverde de Pontones	2020
Lasarte	Martín Berasategui and Paolo Casagrande	Barcelona	2017
Martín Berasategui	Martín Berasategui	Lasarte-Oria	2002
Noor	Paco Morales	Córdoba	2024
Quique Dacosta	Quique Dacosta	Dénia	2013

=== Sweden ===
Michelin 3-star restaurants in Sweden
Restaurant	Chef(s)	Location	Awarded since
Frantzén	Björn Frantzén	Stockholm	2018

=== Switzerland ===
Michelin 3-star restaurants in Switzerland
Restaurant	Chef(s)	Location	Awarded since
Cheval Blanc - Hotel Les Trois Rois	Peter Knogl	Basel	2016
Memories - Grand Resort Bad Ragaz	Sven Wassmer	Bad Ragaz	2022
Restaurant de l'Hôtel de Ville	Franck Giovannini	Crissier	1994
The Japanese Restaurant	Fabio Toffolon and Dominik Sato	Andermatt	2027
Schloss Schauenstein	Andreas Caminada	Fürstenau	2011

=== Taiwan ===
Michelin 3-star restaurants in Taiwan
Restaurant	Chef(s)	Location	Awarded since
JL Studio	Jimmy Lim	Taichung	2023
Le Palais	Ken Chan and Matt Chen	Taipei	2018
Taïrroir	Kai Ho	Taipei	2023

=== Thailand ===
Michelin 3-star restaurants in Thailand
Restaurant	Chef(s)	Location	Awarded since
Sorn	Supaksorn 'Ice' Jongsiri	Bangkok	2025
Sühring	Thomas & Mathias Sühring	Bangkok	2026

=== United Arab Emirates ===
Michelin 3-star restaurants in United Arab Emirates
Restaurant	Chef(s)	Location	Awarded since
FZN by Björn Frantzén	Björn Frantzén	Dubai	2025
Trèsind Studio	Himanshu Saini	Dubai	2025

=== United Kingdom ===
Michelin 3-star restaurants in the United Kingdom
Restaurant	Chef(s)	Location	Awarded since
Alain Ducasse at the Dorchester	Jean-Philippe Blondet	Westminster, London	2010
Core by Clare Smyth	Clare Smyth	Kensington, London	2021
Hélène Darroze at The Connaught	Hélène Darroze	Westminster, London	2021
L'Enclume	Simon Rogan	Cartmel	2022
Moor Hall	Mark Birchall	Aughton	2025
Restaurant Gordon Ramsay	Gordon Ramsay and Matt Abé	Chelsea, London	2001
Sketch (The Lecture Room and Library)	Pierre Gagnaire	Westminster, London	2020
The Fat Duck	Heston Blumenthal	Bray, Berkshire	2004
The Ledbury	Brett Graham	Notting Hill, London	2024
The Waterside Inn	Alain Roux	Bray, Berkshire	1985

=== United States ===
Michelin 3-star restaurants in the United States
Restaurant	Chef(s)	Location	Awarded since
Addison	William Bradley	San Diego	2022
Atelier Crenn	Dominique Crenn and Nick Vollono	San Francisco	2019
Benu	Corey Lee and Brandon Rodgers	San Francisco	2015
Le Bernardin	Éric Ripert, Chris Muller, and Eric Gestel	New York City	2006
Californios	Val M. Cantu	San Francisco	2026
Eleven Madison Park	Daniel Humm and Brian Lockwood	New York City	2012
Enclos	Brian Limoges	Sonoma, California	2026
Jungsik	Jungsik Yim	New York City	2024
Per Se	Thomas Keller and Corey Chow	New York City	2006
Providence	Michael Cimarusti	Los Angeles	2025
Quince	Michael Tusk and Neil Stetz	San Francisco	2017
SingleThread	Kyle Connaughton	Healdsburg, California	2019
Smyth	John B. Shields	Chicago	2023
Somni	Aitor Zabala	West Hollywood, California	2025
Sushi Sho	Keiji Nakazawa	New York City	2025
The French Laundry	Thomas Keller and David Breeden	Yountville, California	2007

== See also ==
- List of female chefs with Michelin stars
- Lists of Michelin-starred restaurants
