= Sorn =

Sorn may refer to:

== Places ==
- Sorn, East Ayrshire, a village in Scotland
- Sorn Castle, East Ayrshire, Scotland
- River Sorn, Islay, Scotland
- Sørn and Bernt, rocks off the coast of South Georgia
- Sorn, restaurant in Bangkok, Thailand

== People ==
- Sorn (singer) (born 1996), Thai singer
- Sorn Davin (born 1992), taekwondo practitioner
- Sorn Silpabanleng (1881–1944), Thai musician better known as Luang Pradit Pairoh
- Sorn Inthor, Cambodian politician
- Sorn Seavmey (born 1995), Cambodian taekwondo practitioner
- Nai Htaw Sorn (1917–2014), Mon (Burmese) political activist
- James Gordon McIntyre, Lord Sorn (1896–1983), Scottish lawyer and judge

== Other uses ==
- A fictional species of Martian humanoid in Out of the Silent Planet by C. S. Lewis
- SORN, Statutory Off Road Notification, exempting a vehicle from UK Vehicle Excise Duty
