= Arnaud Lallement =

French chef

- Born: 28 June 1974 (age 52)
- Culinary career
- Rating: Michelin stars
- Current restaurant: L'Assiette Champenoise (Tinqueux)

Arnaud Lallement (born 28 June 1974) is a French chef. He is the owner of the gastronomic restaurant L'Assiette Champenoise in Tinqueux near Reims. The restaurant obtained its third Michelin star in 2014.

== Life and career ==
After having found the passion of cooking at the age of 5, besides his father in the kitchen, Arnaud Lallement studied at the hotel school of Strasbourg, and then began working alongside famous chefs like Roger Vergé, Michel Guérard and Alain Chapel.

In 1997, he joined his father Jean-Pierre Lallement to work with him in Tinqueux near Reims. In 2001, Arnaud and his restaurant L'Assiette Champenoise got back the Michelin star lost by his father in 1994, star kept by his father for 18 years.

In 2000, after the death of his father, Arnaud, aged 26, became the chef owner of the restaurant L'Assiette Champenoise. In March 2005, the restaurant obtained a second Michelin star.

In 2013, Arnaud Lallement received the prize of "Chef of the Year" from the guide Gault et Millau. In 2014, his restaurant obtained its third star from the Guide Michelin.

== Bibliography ==
- Lallement, Arnaud; Le Boulc'h, Alexandre (2010). L'Hydre (ed.). Carnet des saveurs en Champagne (in French). L'Hydre éd. ISBN 978-2-913703-40-7..
- Lallement, Arnaud; Labourie, Louise; Cellard, Matthieu (2016). La Martinière (ed.). Émotions en Champagne (in French). Paris. p. 448. ISBN 978-2-7324-7932-3..

== See also ==
- List of Michelin 3-star restaurants
