= List of Michelin-starred restaurants in Slovenia =

As of the 2026 Michelin Guide, there are 10 restaurants in Slovenia with a Michelin star rating.

The Michelin Guides have been published by the French tire company Michelin since 1900. They were designed as a guide to tell drivers about eateries they recommended to visit and to subtly sponsor their tires, by encouraging drivers to use their cars more and therefore need to replace the tires as they wore out. Over time, the stars that were given out started to become more valuable.

Multiple anonymous Michelin inspectors visit the restaurants several times. They rate the restaurants on five criteria: "quality of products", "mastery of flavor and cooking techniques", "the personality of the chef represented in the dining experience", "value for money", and "consistency between inspectors' visits". Inspectors have at least ten years of expertise and create a list of popular restaurants supported by media reports, reviews, and diner popularity. If they reach a consensus, Michelin awards restaurants from one to three stars based on its evaluation methodology: One star means "high-quality cooking, worth a stop", two stars signify "excellent cooking, worth a detour", and three stars denote "exceptional cuisine, worth a special journey". The stars are not permanent and restaurants are constantly being re-evaluated. If the criteria are not met, the restaurant will lose its stars. The Michelin Guide for Slovenia was first published in 2020 and revealed in March of the same year.

== Lists ==
Key
1 Michelin star	One Michelin star
2 Michelin stars	Two Michelin stars
3 Michelin stars	Three Michelin stars
—	The restaurant did not receive a star that year
Closed	The restaurant is no longer open

Michelin-starred restaurants
Name	Cuisine	Location	2020	2021	2022	2023	2024	2025	2026
COB	Global	Portorož	—	—	1 Michelin star	1 Michelin star	1 Michelin star	1 Michelin star	1 Michelin star
Dam	Mediterranean	Nova Gorica	1 Michelin star	1 Michelin star	1 Michelin star	1 Michelin star	1 Michelin star	1 Michelin star	1 Michelin star
Galerija Okusov	Slovenian	Radovljica	—	—	—	—	—	—	1 Michelin star
Gostilna pri Lojzetu	Modern	Vipava	1 Michelin star	1 Michelin star	1 Michelin star	1 Michelin star	1 Michelin star	1 Michelin star	1 Michelin star
Grič	Slovenian	Šentjošt nad Horjulom	—	1 Michelin star	1 Michelin star	1 Michelin star	1 Michelin star	1 Michelin star	1 Michelin star
Hiša Denk	Slovenian	Zgornja Kungota	1 Michelin star	1 Michelin star	1 Michelin star	1 Michelin star	1 Michelin star	1 Michelin star	1 Michelin star
Hiša Franko	Creative	Kobarid	2 Michelin stars	2 Michelin stars	2 Michelin stars	3 Michelin stars	3 Michelin stars	3 Michelin stars	3 Michelin stars
Hiša Linhart	Slovenian	Radovljica	—	—	1 Michelin star	1 Michelin star	1 Michelin star	1 Michelin star	1 Michelin star
Milka	Creative	Kranjska Gora	—	—	1 Michelin star	2 Michelin stars	2 Michelin stars	2 Michelin stars	2 Michelin stars
Pavus	Modern	Lasko	—	—	—	—	1 Michelin star	1 Michelin star	1 Michelin star
Restavracija Atelje		Ljubljana	1 Michelin star	1 Michelin star	1 Michelin star	Closed			
Restavracija Strelec	Modern	Ljubljana	—	—	1 Michelin star	1 Michelin star	1 Michelin star	—	—
Vila Podvin	Modern	Radovljica	1 Michelin star	1 Michelin star	1 Michelin star	—	—	—	—
Reference									

== See also ==
- List of Michelin 3-star restaurants
- List of restaurants
