= Björn Frantzén =

Swedish chef

Björn Sandberg Frantzén
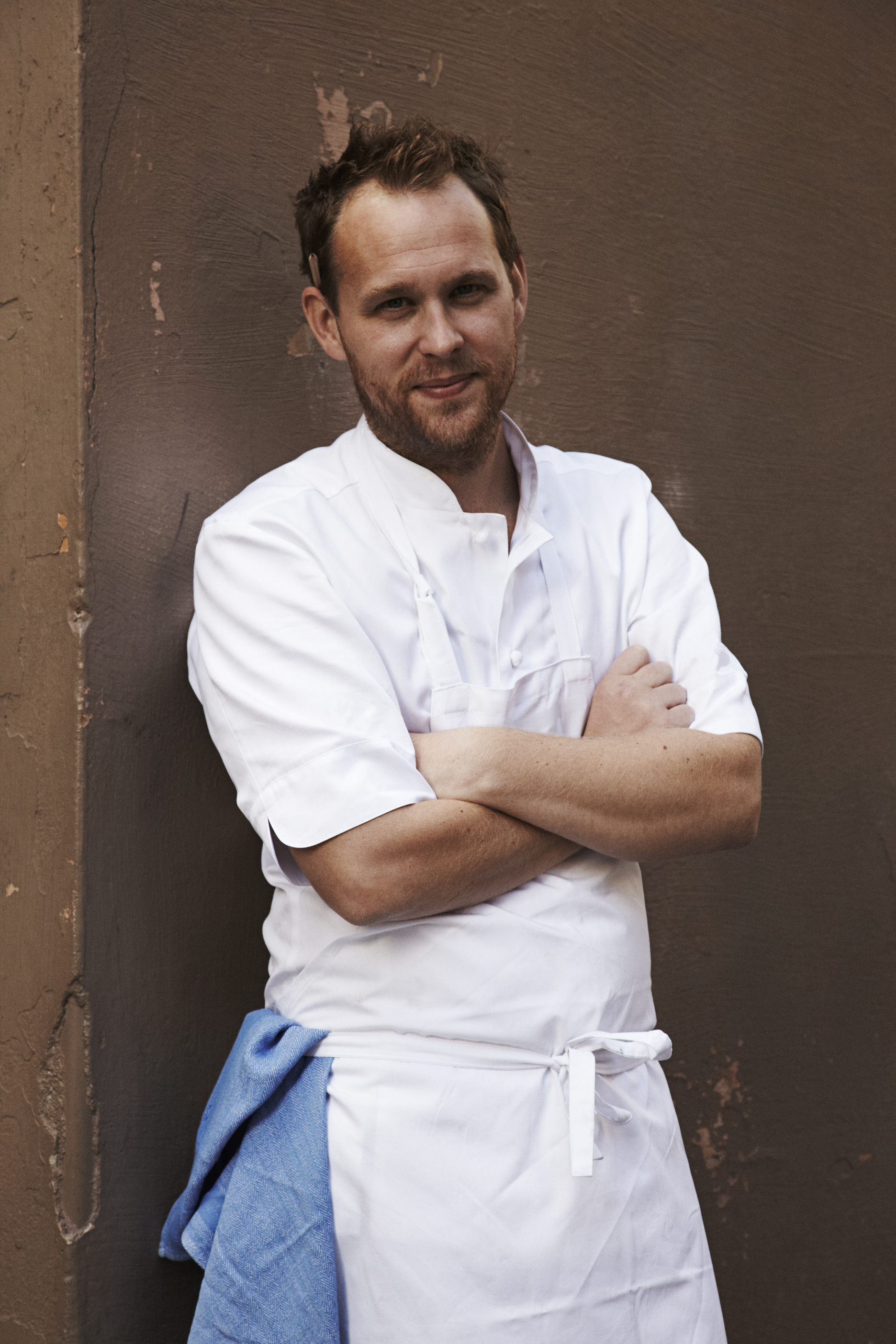
- Björn Frantzén, Datum, 2012
- Born: Björn Frantzén; 26 January 1977 (age 49); Solna, Stockholm, Sweden
- Education: Three years at a restaurant school in Stockholm, one year of military cooking in Boden
- Culinary career
- Cooking style: Contemporary
- Rating: Michelin Stars
- Current restaurants: Frantzén (Stockholm); FZN (Dubai); Zén (Singapore); Brasserie Astoria (Singapore); Brasserie Astoria (Stockholm); Studio Frantzén (London); Studio Frantzén (Dubai); Villa Frantzén (Bangkok)
- Television shows: Frantzén styr upp (2014); Björn Frantzén, SVT documentary
- Website: www.bjornfrantzen.com

Björn Frantzén (born 26 January 1977) is Swedish chef, restaurateur and business man. As of 2025 Björn Frantzén is the only chef in the world in charge of three separate restaurants with three Michelin stars each.

== Career ==
Frantzén was born in Solna, Stockholm, Sweden. He played football for the Stockholm team AIK between 1992 and 1996 before starting his career as a chef. At first, Frantzén worked as a chef at Edsbacka krog before going on to work at other restaurants, such as Chez Nico's, Dining Lettonie, Pied a Terre, and L'Arpege.

Frantzén opened Frantzén/Lindeberg in 2008. The restaurant was awarded its first Michelin star in 2009, and its second in 2010. Frantzén/Lindeberg continued to be rated two stars through 2016. Frantzén/Lindeberg was named number 12 of the 50 Best Restaurants Of The Year in The White Guide.

In addition, Frantzén started Catering Frantzén and Gaston. Gaston was one of a few wine bars in Stockholm. Frantzén was also the creator of the project "Exceptional Swedish Quality Food" that strives to lift Swedish raw products to a world-class standard. The project was done in partnership with Visit Sweden, LRF (Lantbrukarnas Riksförbund), Martin and Servera, Swedish Meat, and the Swedish Board of Agriculture.

In 2016 his first international restaurant was opened — Frantzén's Kitchen in Hong Kong. Summer 2018 he opened the Flying Elk in Hong Kong that was closed by the end of 2019 due to the economic recession. Late 2018, he opened Zén in Singapore which follows his novel "3-floors of eating experience" to be had at Frantzén. In 2021, Zén received its third Michelin star.

Stockholm's The Flying Elk, Corner Club and Gaston were sold in summer 2019.

Brasserie Astoria was opened in spring 2021.

In may 2025 FZN was awarded three stars in the Michelin Guide, which makes Frantzén the only chef in the world with three three-star restaurants.

Björn Frantzén's restaurants around the world are operated through the holding company Frantzén Group, with Frantzén himself as the owner along with, among others, Swedish businesswoman and billionaire Antonia Ax:son Johnson and private equity company Altor founder Harald Mix.

== Personal life ==
Frantzén married his long-term partner in July 2016.

== Media ==
In August 2012, Frantzén ran Sweden's Twitter account for a week. During his run he gave out cooking advice and deflected jokes comparing him to the Swedish Chef.

In 2014 Frantzén starred in cooking reality-show "Frantzén styr upp" produced by TV3.

In the summer of 2014 he did a series of commercials for Mariestads, the export beer from Spendrups brewery.

In 2015 Sveriges Television released documentary Hunger on Björn Frantzén and Daniel Lindeberg that was shot in 2012.

== Bibliography ==
- Frantzén, Björn; Lindeberg, Daniel; Kallentoft, Mons (2012). Lager, Göran (ed.). Frantzén/Lindeberg (in Swedish). Stockholm: Norstedts förlag. p. 320. ISBN 978-91-1-303404-1.
- Frantzén, Björn; Lindeberg, Daniel; Kallentoft, Mons (2013). Lager, Göran (ed.). World-Class Swedish cooking. New York: Skyhorse Publishing. p. 320. ISBN 978-1620877357.
- Frantzén, Björn (2014). Lager, Göran (ed.). Glöd med Björn Frantzén (in Swedish). Stockholm: Albert Bonniers förlag. p. 159. ISBN 978-9174244168.
- Frantzén, Björn (2016). Lager, Göran (ed.). The Flying Elk: gastropub by Björn Frantzén (in Swedish). Stockholm: Norstedts förlag. p. 283. ISBN 9789113075105.
- Frantzén, Björn; Frantzén, Sara (2017). Lager, Göran (ed.). Björn Frantzén lagar mat för sugna diabetiker och annat folk (in Swedish). Stockholm: Norstedts förlag. p. 155. ISBN 978-91-1-307511-2.
- Frantzén, Björn; Jernmark, Marcus; Benitez, Charles; Kroon, Mattias (2020). Lager, Göran (ed.). Frantzén. Stockholm: Norstedts förlag. p. 385. ISBN 978-91-1-309718-3.

== Awards ==
Frantzén's restaurants have been given the following awards:

No.	Name	Country	Rating
1	Frantzén	Sweden	3 Michelin stars
2	Zén (Singapore)	Singapore	3 Michelin stars
3	FZN (Dubai)	UAE	3 Michelin stars

- OAD: #1 Restaurant in Europe
- 12th best restaurant in 2013: Restaurant magazine
- Sweden's best restaurant: 2011, 2012, The White Guide
- Sweden's best food in 2010, The White Guide
- Chefs Pub 2013: Restaurant World
- Chef of Chefs 2013: Restaurant World
- Gulddraken Luxury 2013: DN
- AA Gill's Guest Drake in 2013: DN
