= Enoteca Pinchiorri =

Italian restaurant in Florence

Coordinates: 43°46′12″N 11°15′44″E

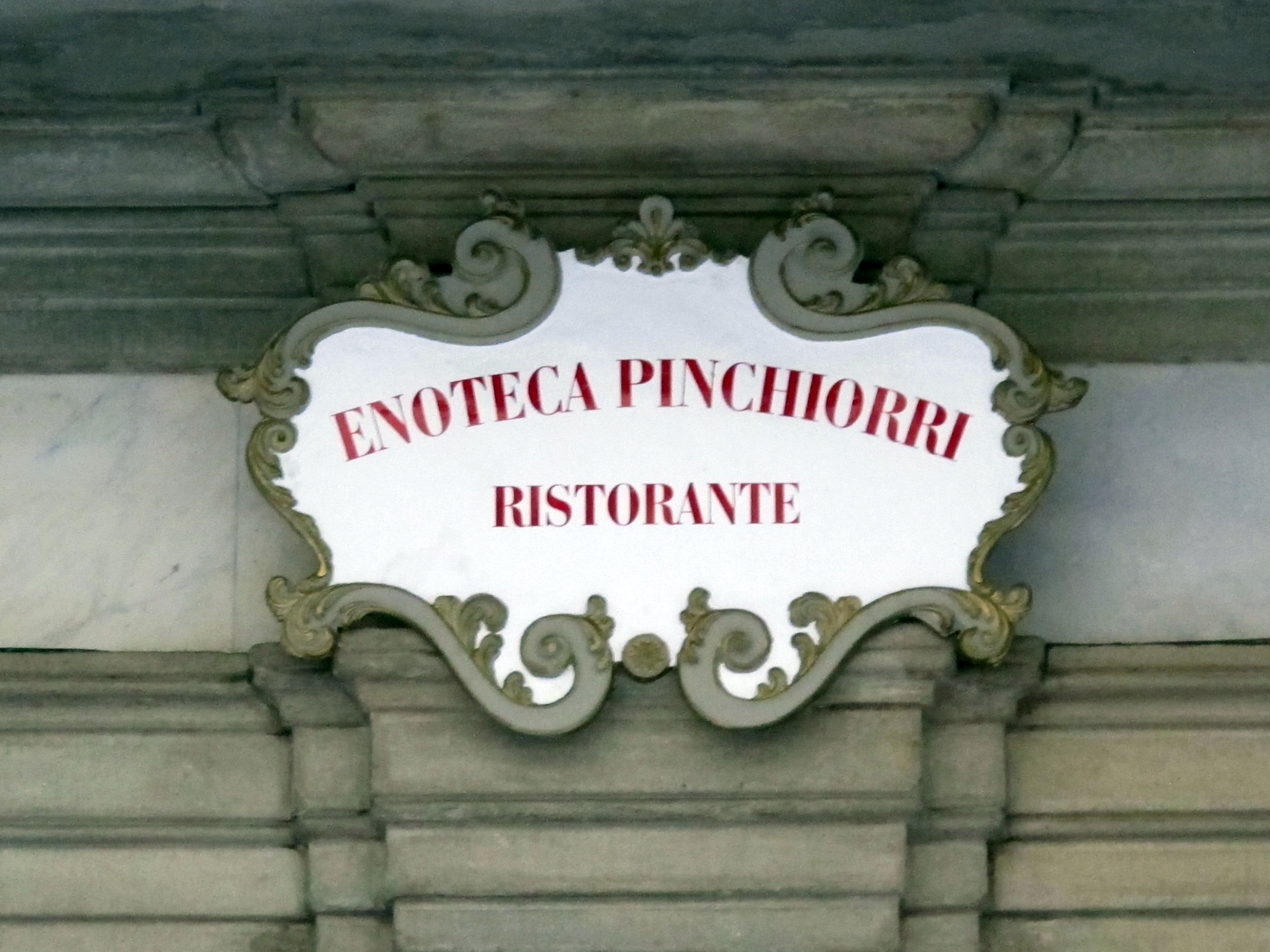
Enoteca Pinchiorri

Enoteca Pinchiorri is an Italian restaurant in Florence, Italy. The owners are Giorgio Pinchiorri and French-born Annie Féolde. The chefs are Annie Féolde, Italo Bassi and Riccardo Monco. In 2008, the restaurant was voted 32nd best in the world by the British Restaurant magazine. Since 1984, the restaurant has been a recipient of the Wine Spectator Grand Award. It has been awarded three stars by the Michelin Guide in 1993 and 1994 and perennially since 2004.

== Annie Féolde ==
Annie Féolde was the first woman outside France to be awarded three stars for her restaurant. Féolde is from Nice, France. Beyond working as a chef, Féolde has served as a bureaucrat in Paris, owner-operator, and instructor to her apprentices. As a young chef, Franck Cerutti worked under Féolde for seven years. Annie Féolde was featured in Great Women Chefs of Europe, which was written by revered journalist and food critic, Gilles Pudlowski.

== Alumni ==
Masahiko Kobe, Iron Chef Italian on Fuji TV's Iron Chef from 1997 to the show's final episode in 1999, trained at Enoteca Pinchiorri from 1993 to 1997.

== See also ==
- List of Michelin 3-star restaurants
- List of Michelin-starred restaurants in Italy
