= Christopher Coutanceau =

French chef

- Born: 12 October 1978 (age 48); La Rochelle, Charente-Maritime, France
- Culinary career
- Rating
- Michelin stars
- Current restaurant
- Restaurant Christopher Coutanceau
- Website: www.coutanceaularochelle.com

Christopher Coutanceau (born 12 October 1978) is a French chef. He is the owner of the restaurant Christopher Coutanceau, three Michelin stars at La Rochelle. He defines himself as a "fisherman-chef" and is a proponent of sustainable fishing. He is the son of chef Richard Coutanceau and the brother of chef Grégory Coutanceau.

== Life and career ==
Christopher Coutanceau is the second son of Richard and Maryse Coutanceau, who obtained their first Michelin star a few years after his birth, the second star following in 1986. As a child, he dreamt of becoming a professional soccer player and joined the soccer club FC Nantes at the age of 12. However, he also entered the restaurant and fishing field. At the age of 3, he already went at the fishing market before school and later, fished with his grandfather and regularly worked as a seasonal employee in the family restaurant.

Without warning his parents, he registered at the Lycée hôtelier de La Rochelle where he followed his training course as a competitor, regularly participating at cooking contestants. He followed internships with Michel Guérard, who had already trained his father, at his restaurant Prés d'Eugènie and with Jean Bardet at his restaurant Château Belmont. After his professional graduation, he worked again with Michel Guérard and then at El Bulli with Ferran Adria, at Le Grand Véfour with Guy Martin and at the Restaurant Laurent in Paris, where Joël Robuchon is the advising chef. He also worked at the Café de Paris in Biarritz with Didier Oudill. He followed a training course in pastry at the Lenôtre school and with Pierre Hermé with the advice of his father who considers that "a real chef, to be at the top level, must be butcher, baker, pastry chef, caterer".

In 2001, he came back to La Rochelle and opened at age 22 the restaurant Le Vieux Port that he owned for three years, until his father asked him to come back to the family restaurant to work with him. In 2007, Richard Coutanceau retired and Christopher Coutanceau bought the restaurant with the sommelier Nicolas Brossard. In 2008, he maintains his second Michelin star.

In 2018, he published the cook book Christopher Coutanceau, cuisinier-pêcheur. In January 2019, Christopher Coutanceau received the "prize of the sustainable gastronomy". In October 2019, he participates as a guest chef in an episode from the season 11 of Top Chef filmed at La Rochelle. In January 2020, he obtained his third Michelin star.

== Publications ==
- Christopher Coutanceau; Patricia Khenouna (2018). Glénat (ed.). Christopher Coutanceau, cuisinier-pêcheur (in French). Glénat. ISBN 978-2344027431.

== See also ==
- List of Michelin 3-star restaurants
