= Gilles Goujon =

French chef and restaurant owner

- Born: 10 December 1961 (age 63); Bourges, Cher, France
- Culinary career
- Cooking style: Haute cuisine
- Rating(s): Michelin stars
- Current restaurant(s): L'Auberge du Vieux Puits (Fontjoncouse)
- Website: www.aubergeduvieuxpuits.fr

Gilles Goujon (born 10 December 1961) is a French chef and owner of the restaurant L'Auberge du Vieux Puits (roughly "The Old Well Inn") in Fontjoncouse, Aude. His restaurant has earned three Michelin stars, the first being awarded in 2010.

== Early life ==
Goujon was born in Bourges in the department of Cher. His father was a fighter pilot, and while growing up he lived in Marrakesh in Morocco, in Germany, and in Metz. After his father's early death, the family moved to Béziers. Goujon had little taste for school and became a waiter in a restaurant, which formed his decision to become a cook.

== Career ==
In 1977, he began an apprenticeship with the railway company Chemins de fer du Midi in the former restaurant at the Gare de Béziers. He was awarded the best apprentice in the region of Languedoc-Roussillon.

In 1981, he became an assistant chef under the Rouquette brothers at Ragueneau, also in Béziers. There in 1983 he met his mentor Roger Vergé, who hired him as an assistant chef in his three-starred restaurant Moulin de Mougins. Four months later he was made responsible for the fish department. He stayed there for four years, discovering all the subtleties and the flavors of the regional cuisine.

In 1987, he moved to Marseille, where he became sous chef under Jean-Paul Passédat, at that time in charge of the two-starred restaurant Le Petit Nice. This gave him training in rigorous preparation.

Two years later, in 1989, he became sous chef under Gérard Clor at the one-starred restaurant L'Escale in Carry-le-Rouet. He stayed there for three years and helped win a second Michelin star for the restaurant.

== L'Auberge du Vieux Puits ==
In 1992, Goujon started his own restaurant in Fontjoncouse, a small, isolated village in the department of Aude, with approximately one hundred inhabitants. The mayor had decided that the only way the village could survive was by creating a destination restaurant, and had constructed the inn with public money, adapting an old stable. Unfortunately every operator of the establishment failed to make money.

At the same time, Goujon had decided that he would have his own restaurant by the time he was 30. Not having much money, he and his wife Marie-Christine began looking, but could not find anything suitable that they could afford.

Then they received a telephone call from the Mayor of Fontjoncouse, offering them the inn, whose third failed tenant had just left. They went there to look at it, were charmed by the location, and bought it for 34,000 €. It took considerable work to fix it up and make it a pleasant restaurant.

For five years, the restaurant was virtually empty, few diners venturing out into the garrigue to visit it. Then weekenders began to arrive, and other restaurateurs suggested to Goujon that he enter the Meilleur Ouvrier de France professional competition; he did so and won the title in 1996, which made him famous. In 1997, Gault Millau rated him 14 out of 20 and the Bottin Gourmand awarded him a star. The Michelin Guide gave him his first star the same year.

In 2001, he received his second Michelin star for his abilities as a chef and his innovation. In 2010, he received his third Michelin star, the only new chef to receive the distinction in that edition.

The cuisine at L'Auberge du Vieux Puits focuses on local foods, featuring simple ingredients such as cabbages, tomatoes and seasonal vegetables, lamb, goat, seasonal game (boar, hare, quail, and woodcock), pork from the Bigorre black pig, pigeon, picholine olives, rosemary, basil, cod, apples, potatoes (for example the Pays de Sault variety) and figs.

Goujon and other chefs have spoken out against guests who photograph the food and post it on social media, which "spoils the surprise" and could lead to others' copying his creations.

== See also ==
- List of Michelin 3-star restaurants
