= Arnaud Donckele =

French chef (born 1977)

- Born: March 29, 1977 (age 49); Rouen, France
- Culinary career
- Cooking style: Haute cuisine
- Current restaurants
- Plénitude (Paris); La Vague d'Or (Saint-Tropez); Hakuba (Paris); Le Tout-Paris (Paris); La Terrasse (Saint-Tropez); Arnaud Donckele & Maxime Frédéric at Louis Vuitton (Saint-Tropez)

Arnaud Donckele (born 29 March 1977) is a French chef. He currently runs two Michelin 3-star restaurants, La Vague d'Or at Cheval Blanc St-Tropez (formerly Résidence de la Pinède) and "Plénitude" at Cheval Blanc Paris. His Saint-Tropez restaurant was awarded 3 Michelin stars in 2013, his Parisian restaurant in 2022.

== Life and career ==
Arnaud Donckele was born in Rouen in the department of Seine-Maritime. He grew up in Mantes-la-Jolie with his parents who were charcutiers-traiteurs, Philippe and Véronique Donckele, and in Catenay with his grandparents, farmers that came from Flanders. From the Normandic farm of his grandparents, he kept the taste of cultivation and the contact with the producers. His father was passionate for cooking and hunting and read cookbooks from the Robert Laffont collection, written by Michel Guérard, Roger Vergé, Alain Chapel, Jacques Maximin or even the Troisgros. To get closer to his parents, Arnaud Donckele spent time with them while they worked and he developed a passion for cooking since his childhood.

At age 16, Arnaud Donckele decided to go to Paris to prepare a BEP (Brevet d'Études Professionnelles) in cooking despite the reticence of his parents. He began a training course at the École Ferrandi and with the chef Georges Landriot at Goumard Prunier. In 1996, he did an internship in the three starred restaurant Les Prés d'Eugénie of Michel Guérard in Eugénie-les-Bains and decided to stay, giving up his training course at the same time. First as a cooking assistant, trained by the Meilleur Ouvrier de France Olivier Brulard, sous-chef of Michel Guérard, he became semi-chef de partie and then chef de partie, and at age 21, saucer chef. He met at that time his future wife Marie.

In 1998, he sent a spontaneous application to Alain Ducasse who hired him at the Restaurant Louis XV de Monaco, as third cooking assistant before the executive chef Franck Cerruti made him progress. He then did his conscription in the kitchens of the Hôtel Matignon, which permitted Alain Ducasse to keep him at the restaurant of the Plaza Athénée in Paris, before returning to Monaco. In 2001, Alain Ducasse placed him as a sous-chef of Jean-Louis Nomicos from the restaurant Lasserre. Arnaud Donckele married his partner Marie, with whom he had his first child, son Maxence.

In 2004, he learned that Olivier Brulard left the Michelin starred restaurant La Vague d'Or of the luxury hotel La Résidence de la Pinède in Saint-Tropez. He sent a job demand to the owner Jean-Claude Délion. Alain Ducasse recommended him and Arnaud Donckele became the chef of the restaurant at age 27. His second son, was born in Provence.

== Prizes and titles ==
In 2008, the Gault et Millau gave him four toques for his France guide. In 2010, he received two stars at the Guide Michelin for the restaurant he runs, La Vague d'Or at Cheval Blanc St-Tropez. In 2012, he received the prize of the "Jeune chef de l'avenir" by the international food academy. His restaurant also obtained, on 22 May 2012, the official label of 5 stars. In 2013 Arnaud Donckele received his third Michelin star for his hotel and restaurant. Also in 2013 he was elected "Chef of the year" by the restaurant professionals, election organized by the magazine Le Chef Magazine.

== See also ==
- List of Michelin 3-starred restaurants
