= Eneko Atxa =

Spanish Basque cuisine chef

Eneko Atxa Azurmendi (born September 14, 1977) is a Spanish Basque cuisine chef, known for his sustainability practices.

== Career ==
Atxa started in the culinary world at age 15 at the Culinary School of Leioa in Biscay, Basque Country, but was initially trained by his mother and grandmother. He combined his study time with work at their restaurant, where he learned traditional Basque cuisine. Later he worked for several restaurants. After this apprenticeship, he moved on to prestigious restaurants, developing his own personality and style.

In 2005, after several head chef positions in renowned restaurants, he decided to open his own restaurant, Azurmendi*** (also known as Azurmedi***). In 2012, Azurmendi*** was awarded 3 Michelin stars, becoming the first and only restaurant in Biscay to obtain this distinction. This makes Atxa, at 35, one of the youngest chefs in Spain to achieve three stars. Azurmendi***, with three Michelin stars and one green star, has twice been awarded the "most sustainable restaurant" in The World's 50 Best list.

In 2012, he finished a bioclimatic building for his restaurant using recycled materials (aluminium, glass, plastic and slag) and renewable energy (which has resulted in 50% energy savings). Geothermal energy and photovoltaic solar panels provide the power, and rainwater is used for all irrigation and bathroom needs.

In conjunction with the Alicia Foundation and University of the Basque Country, he is working on a germplasm bank, which is expected to host 400+ local vegetable seed varieties, with an emphasis on teaching about the value of genetic diversity preservation. Located in the Interpretation Center for Sustainability of Azurmendi, it was promoted by the City Council of Larrabetzu as a way of establishing a circular economic system, with the use of compost generated by local farmers that acts as a fertilizer.

In 2016, Atxa created JAKI(N), an "incubator of innovative ideas" used to promote actions related to people, the environment, health and society.

In 2019 he created, together with Xabi Uribe-Etxebarria, the Bestfarmers initiative, a project to give visibility and value to producers, encouraging and rewarding sustainable farming practices.

== Awards ==
- Signature Cuisine Champion of Spain for Young Chefs in 2003
- The Haute Cuisine for Young Chefs Award (Lo Mejor de la Gastronomia) in 2004
- Opening of Azurmendi in 2005
- Best Newcomer Restaurant in Madrid Fusión in 2006
- First Michelin star for Azurmendi in 2007
- Euskadi Award for Best Chef of the Year in 2007
- Healthy Cuisine Award from the Galician Gastronomic Forum in 2008
- Second Michelin star for Azurmendi in 2010
- The Prix du Chef L'Avenir (International Academy of Gastronomy) in 2010
- 3 Michelín Stars for Azurmendi (2012)
- Azurmendi is named the Best Restaurant in Europe by Opinionated About Dining (OAD) in 2015
- Young Chef of the Year (Elite Traveler) in 2015
- World's Most Sustainable Restaurant Award (World's 50 Best Restaurants/Sustainable Restaurant Association) 2014 and 2018.
- Eneko Atxa wins the 2015 National Gastronomy Award for Best Chef in 2016. That year Azurmendi is named tenth best restaurant in the world by Tripadvisor and also received the National Award for Hospitality Company committed to Sustainability by the Federation of Hospitality Companies of Spain. The publication 'Fuera de Serie', from the 'Unidad Editorial' group, has chosen Eneko Atxa as one of the people of the year 2016, in the gastronomy category.
- ENEKO restaurant is recognized with a Michelin star (2017). Azurmendi is the Best restaurant in the world according to Elite Traveler magazine Eneko Atxa wins the GQ Businessman of the Year Award.
- 2019: Westholme Highest Climber Award (World's 50 Best Restaurants) 14th place. Eneko Atxa wins Best Chef Award 2019 in Europe by Madrid Fusion. Eneko Atxa wins the National Prize for Healthy Gastronomy to the Most Outstanding Personality 2018.
- 2020: Azurmendi and ENEKO win a Green Michelin star
- 2021: Eneko Atxa wins the first 'Sustainable Sun' Award from the Repsol Guide. Azurmendi wins the Sustainability Award from Madrid Fusión.
- 2022: Eneko Atxa receives the 'MadBlue Cinco Océanos' 2022 Award for his work in sustainability and the Sustainability award from Gentleman magazine.
