= Bezannes =

- Commune
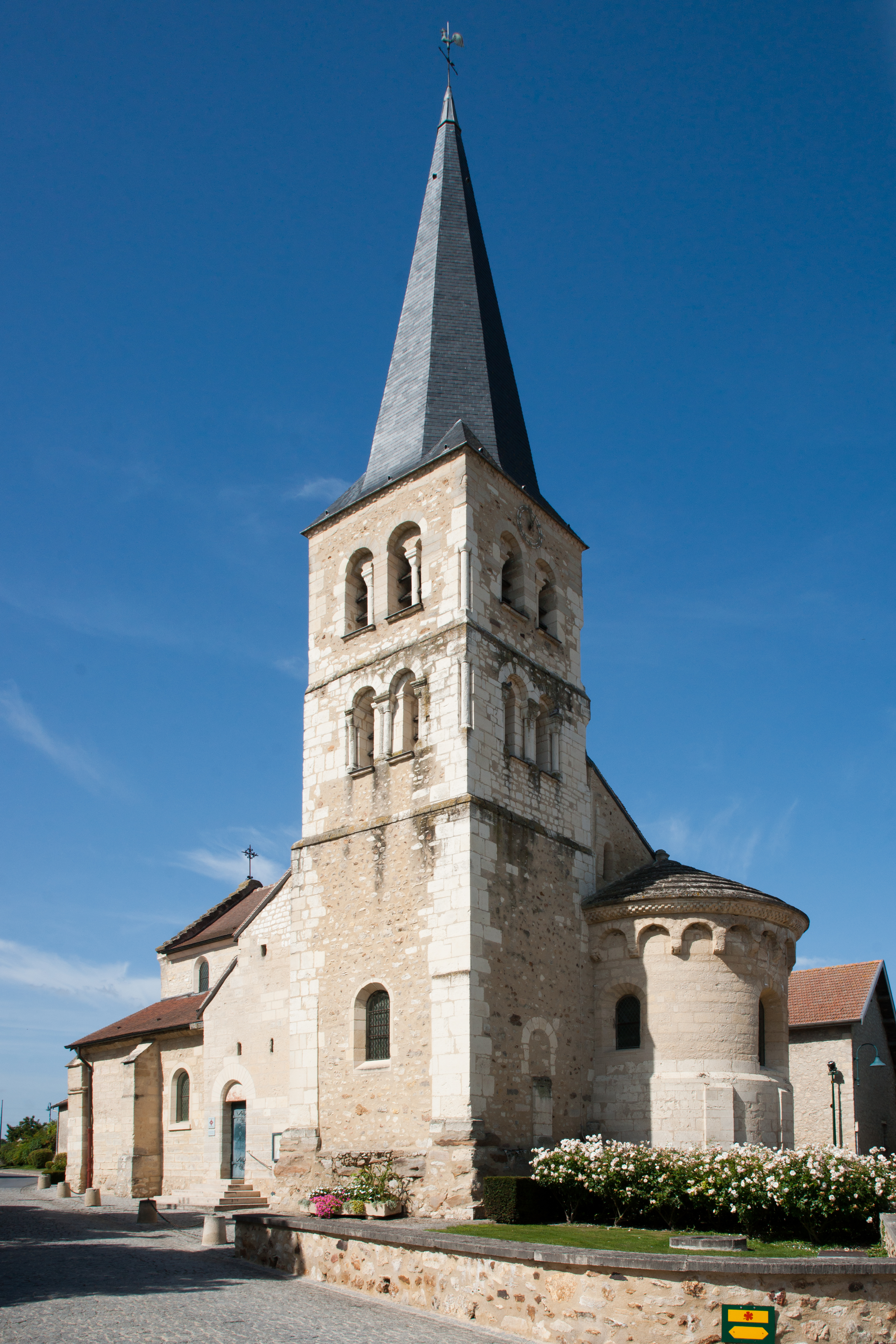
- Bezannes Church

- Coat of arms
- Location of Bezannes
- Location within France Location within Grand Est
- Coordinates: 49°13′27″N 3°59′22″E
- Country: France
- Region: Grand Est
- Department: Marne
- Arrondissement: Reims
- Canton: Reims-4
- Intercommunality: CU Grand Reims

Government
  - Mayor (2020–2026): Dominique Potar
- Area^{1}: 8.01 km^{2} (3.09 sq mi)
- Elevation: 81 m (266 ft)
- Population (2023): 5,039
  - Density: 629/km^{2} (1,630/sq mi)
- Time zone: UTC+01:00 (CET)
  - Summer (DST): UTC+02:00 (CEST)
- INSEE/Postal code: 51058 /51430
- ^{1} French Land Register data, which excludes lakes, ponds, glaciers > 1 km^{2} (0.386 sq mi or 247 acres) and river estuaries.

Bezannes (French pronunciation: [bəzan]) is a commune of the Marne department in northeastern France, near the city of Reims. The Gare de Champagne-Ardenne TGV is located on the territory of the commune.

== Population ==
Historical population
Year	Pop.	±% p.a.
1968	563	—
1975	558	−0.13%
1982	669	+2.63%
1990	1,031	+5.56%
1999	1,299	+2.60%
2007	1,291	−0.08%
2012	1,460	+2.49%
2017	2,121	+7.76%
2023	5,039	+15.51%
Source: INSEE

== See also ==
- Communes of the Marne department
