= Champfleury, Marne =

Champfleury
- Commune
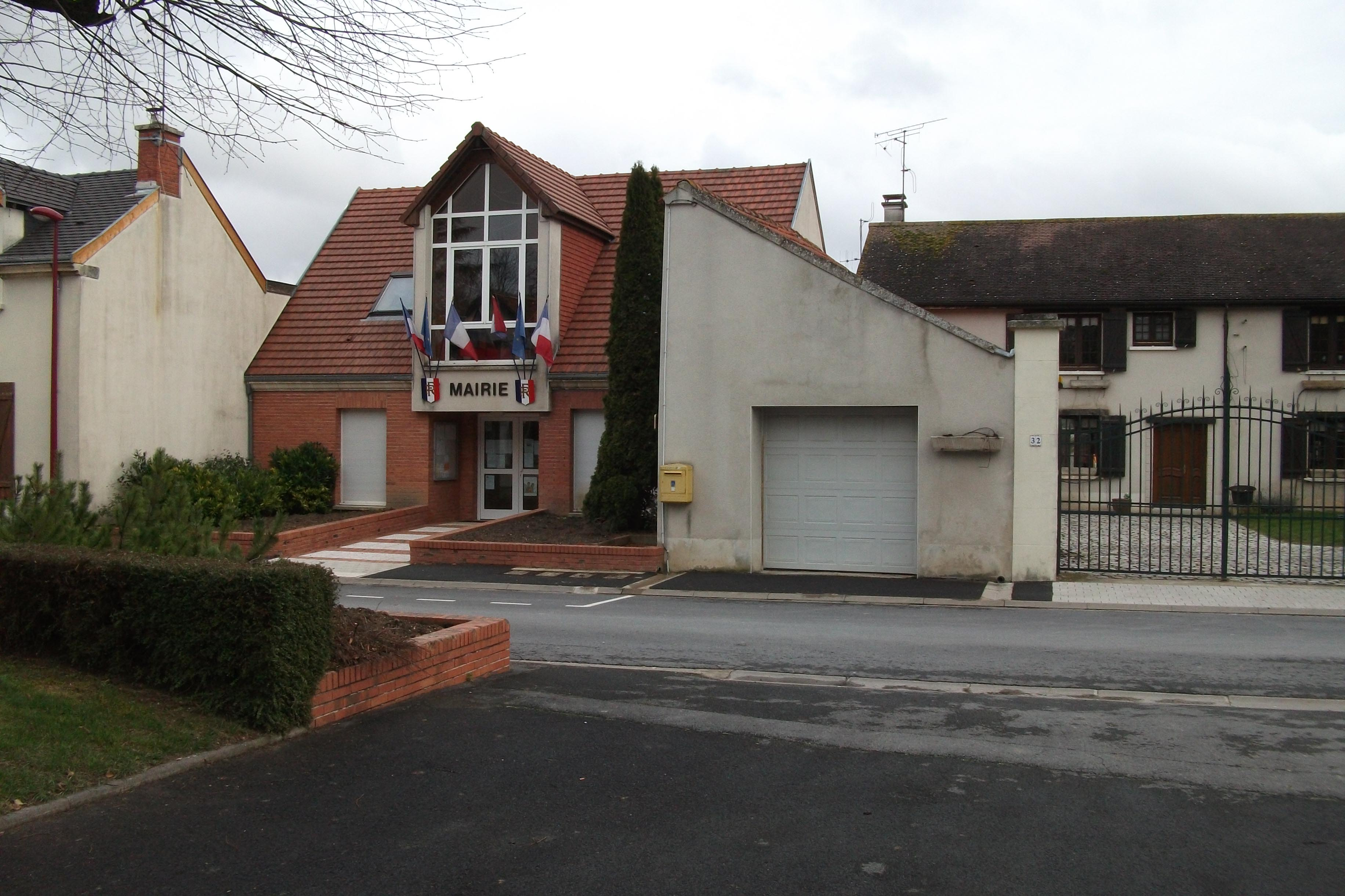
- The town hall in Champfleury
- Location of Champfleury
- Location within France Location within Grand Est
- Coordinates: 49°11′56″N 4°01′03″E
- Country: France
- Region: Grand Est
- Department: Marne
- Arrondissement: Reims
- Canton: Reims-4
- Intercommunality: CU Grand Reims

Government
  - Mayor (2020–2026): Alain Hirault
- Area^{1}: 4.02 km^{2} (1.55 sq mi)
- Highest elevation: 144 m (472 ft)
- Lowest elevation: 88 m (289 ft)
- Population (2023): 620
  - Density: 150/km^{2} (400/sq mi)
- Time zone: UTC+01:00 (CET)
  - Summer (DST): UTC+02:00 (CEST)
- INSEE/Postal code: 51115 /51500
- ^{1} French Land Register data, which excludes lakes, ponds, glaciers > 1 km^{2} (0.386 sq mi or 247 acres) and river estuaries.

Champfleury is a commune in the Marne department in north-eastern France.

== See also ==
- Communes of the Marne department
