= Villers-aux-Nœuds =

- Commune
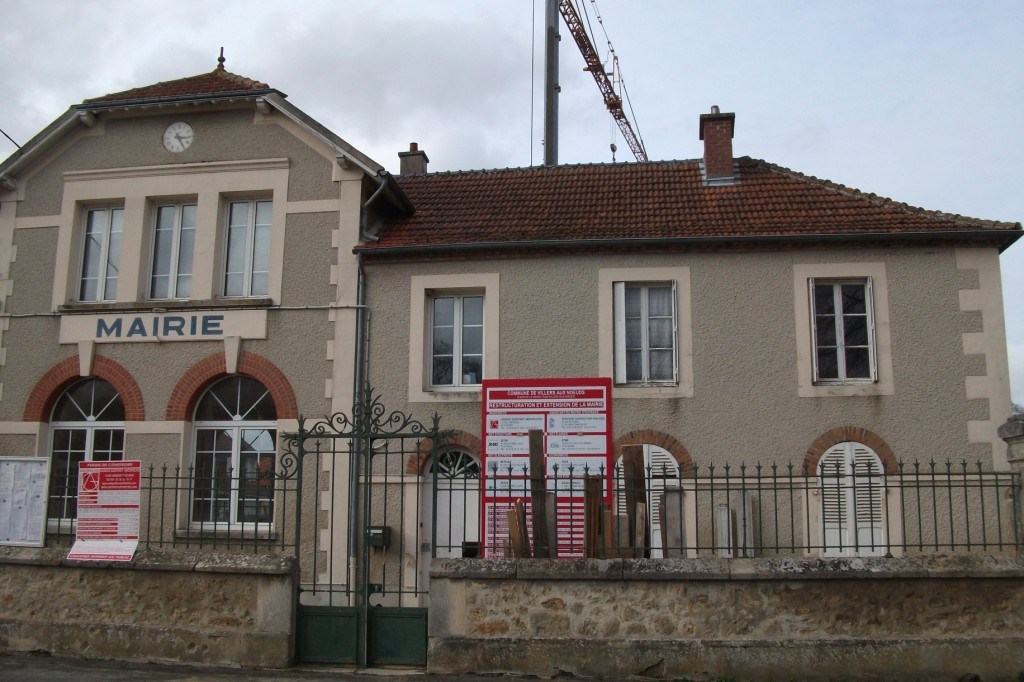
- The town hall in Villers-aux-Nœuds
- Location of Villers-aux-Nœuds
- Location within France Location within Grand Est
- Coordinates: 49°11′41″N 3°59′50″E
- Country: France
- Region: Grand Est
- Department: Marne
- Arrondissement: Reims
- Canton: Reims-4
- Intercommunality: CU Grand Reims

Government
  - Mayor (2020–2026): Thierry Désira
- Area^{1}: 6.44 km^{2} (2.49 sq mi)
- Highest elevation: 151 m (495 ft)
- Lowest elevation: 89 m (292 ft)
- Population (2023): 342
  - Density: 53.1/km^{2} (138/sq mi)
- Time zone: UTC+01:00 (CET)
  - Summer (DST): UTC+02:00 (CEST)
- INSEE/Postal code: 51631 /51500
- ^{1} French Land Register data, which excludes lakes, ponds, glaciers > 1 km^{2} (0.386 sq mi or 247 acres) and river estuaries.

Villers-aux-Nœuds (French pronunciation: [vilɛʁ o nø]) is a commune in the Marne department in north-eastern France.

== See also ==
- Communes of the Marne department
