= Giorgio Pinchiorri =

- Born: October 6, 1946 (age 78)
- Citizenship: Italian
- Occupation: Sommelier
- Known for: Founder of Enoteca Pinchiorri

Giorgio Pinchiorri (born 6 October 1946) is an Italian sommelier. He is the cofounder with Annie Féolde of the Enoteca Pinchiorri restaurant in Florence.

== Biography ==
Pinchiorri was first drawn to the world of wine during the 1958 FIFA World Cup when the food journalist Luigi Veronelli was hosting a wine and food show during the games' breaks. At one point, he worked at the trattoria Buca Lapi. He cites Luigi Veronelli (for food) and Beppino Lapi (for wine) as being his main influences. The latter taught him all about wine during the 1966 flood of the Arno.

He launched the Enoteca Nazionale, then a collection focused exclusively on Italian wines, in 1972. The next year, it became a wine bar with food. In 1978, with Annie Féolde, he founded the restaurant Enoteca Pinchiorri. She also helped him develop his distribution network with the French châteaux. The new restaurant gained a sudden popularity thanks to an excellent rating given by Luigi Veroinelli. The Enoteca Pinchiorri entered the Michelin guide in 1981 and got its first star in 1982. With the publicity, Pinchiorri removed the word Nazionale from the Enoteca Nazionale to extend his collection to international wines. During the 1980s, he bought large quantities of Romanée-Conti. The Enoteca received the Wine Spectator Grand Award in 1984. The couple opened an Enoteca Pinchiorri in Tokyo, Japan, in 1992. The Florence restaurant won a third Michelin star that same year but lost it a few years later. In the early 2000s, they completely renovated the Florence restaurant and regained its third Michelin star in 2003.

Pinchiorri has more than 80,000 bottles of wine in its cellar. An auction sale of 2,500 of his bottles in 2020 generated $4.1 million in sales. Items sold included Barolo Monfortino Riserva Giacomo Conterno 1978, Barbaresco Sori San Lorenzo Gaja 2015, Solaia 2015, Masseto 2014, Brunello di Montalcino Riserva Biondi Santi 1990.

== Awards ==
- 1971: Best Sommelier of Italy by the Italian Sommelier Association

== Bibliography ==
- Castellucci, Leonardo (2017). Pinchiorri a due vocci [Pinchiorri, Two Voices that Become One] (in Italian) (2nd ed.). Cinquesensi. ISBN 978-88-99876-12-8.
