= Champigny, Marne =

Champigny
- Commune
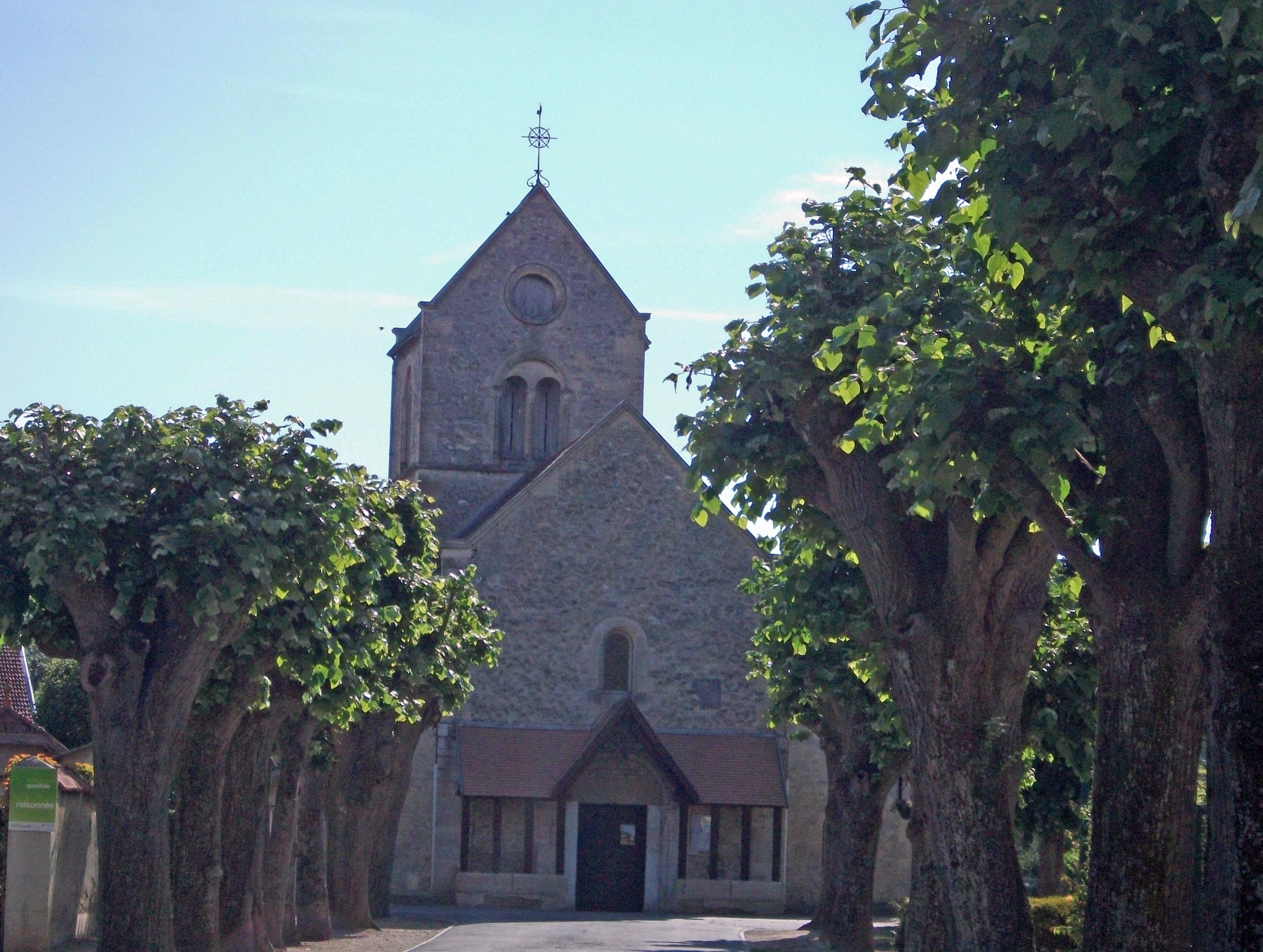
- St-Théodulphe church in Champigny
- Location of Champigny
- Location within France Location within Grand Est
- Coordinates: 49°16′05″N 3°58′20″E
- Country: France
- Region: Grand Est
- Department: Marne
- Arrondissement: Reims
- Canton: Reims-4
- Intercommunality: CU Grand Reims

Government
  - Mayor (2020–2026): Pierre Georgin
- Area^{1}: 4.49 km^{2} (1.73 sq mi)
- Elevation: 74 m (243 ft)
- Population (2023): 1,647
  - Density: 367/km^{2} (950/sq mi)
- Time zone: UTC+01:00 (CET)
  - Summer (DST): UTC+02:00 (CEST)
- INSEE/Postal code: 51118 /51370
- ^{1} French Land Register data, which excludes lakes, ponds, glaciers > 1 km^{2} (0.386 sq mi or 247 acres) and river estuaries.

Champigny (French pronunciation: [ʃɑ̃piɲi]) is a commune in the Marne department in north-eastern France.

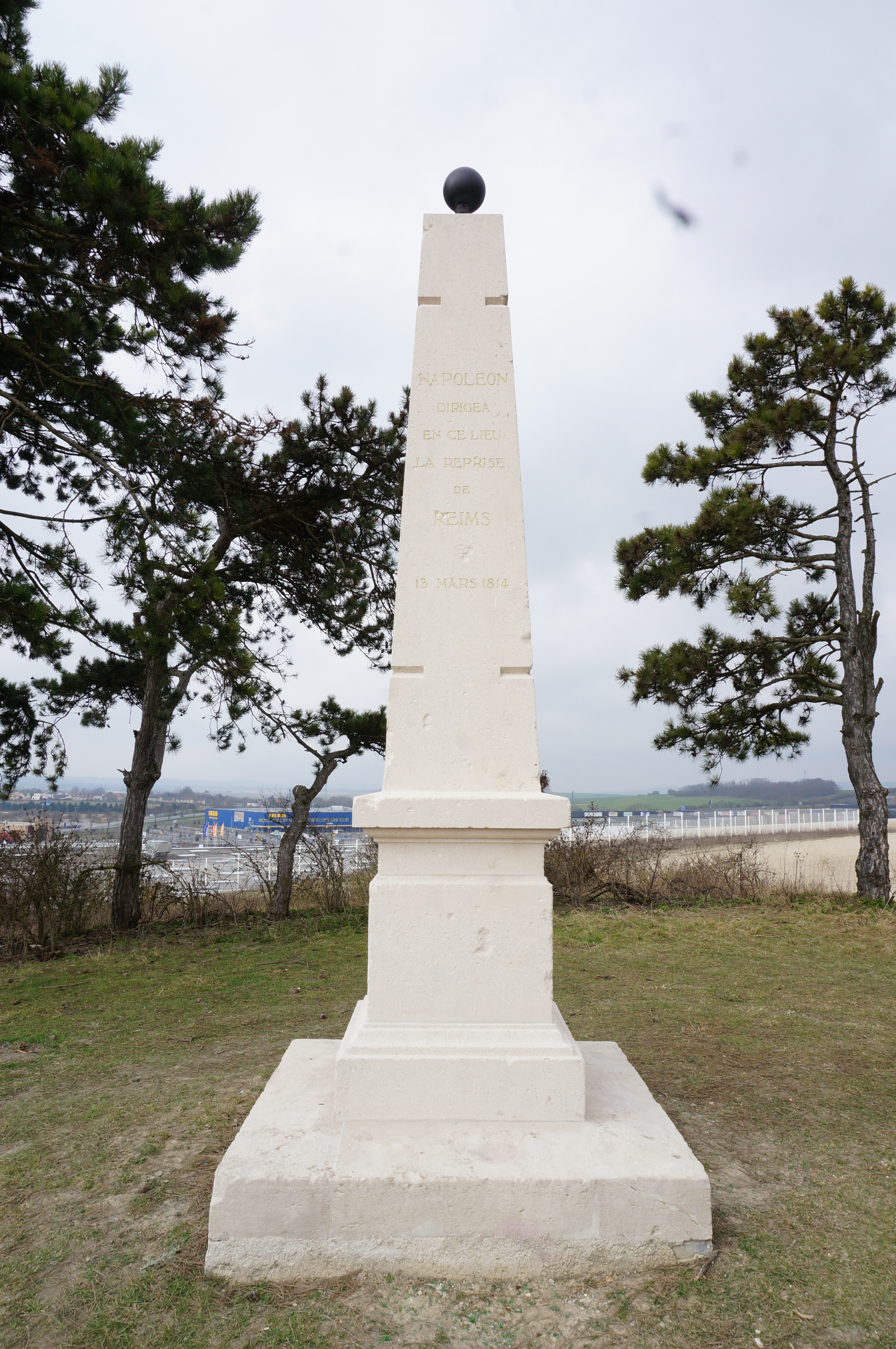
Battle of Reims memorial.

== See also ==
- Communes of the Marne department
