= Annie Féolde =

French chef

- Born: Nice, France
- Culinary career
- Rating: Michelin stars
- Current restaurant: Enoteca Pinchiorri
- Television show: Top Chef Italia

Annie Féolde is a French chef, best known for holding three Michelin stars at her restaurant Enoteca Pinchiorri in Florence, Italy. She was the first female chef in Italy to win that level of accolade, and only the fourth ever.

== Career ==
Born near Nice, France, Annie Féolde's parents ran a hotel. Her father came from this background, whereas her mother's family were farmers. Upon completing secondary school, Féolde left home and moved to Marseille, where she worked for La Poste, and was then transferred to Paris. She began to travel further to improve her language skills, first to London where she lived with a family to look after their Labrador Retriever.

She hoped to repeat the same situation in Florence, Italy, as she had in London, but the family there had agreed to house two women and the other one got there first, leaving Féolde without anywhere to live upon arrival. She started working at a local restaurant instead in order to cover her living costs. This meant that she couldn't afford to go to an Italian language school as planned, but instead learnt the language from interacting with customers. She met sommelier and wine collector Giorgio Pinchiorri a year later in 1970. Together they opened Enoteca Pinchiorri, with Féolde as head chef. They grew the restaurant from a wine bar serving snacks to a full restaurant serving hot food by 1974. She appeared on Italian television for the first time at the request of food critic Edoardo Raspelli, who inspired her to develop a modern take on Tuscan cuisine.

She won her first Michelin star in 1981 at Enoteca Pinchiorri; the duo only found out when Pinchiorri bought a copy of that year's Michelin Guide from a newsagent. The second star came the following year, and the third in 1992. This made Féolde the first female chef in Italy to win three Michelin stars, and only the fourth woman ever. The same year, arsonists set fire to the wine cellar at the restaurant. Following an assessment of the damage, Féolde convinced Pinchiorri to keep the restaurant open and not shut down permanently. To celebrate 40 years running Enoteca Pinchiorri, an autobiography of both Féolde and Giorgio Pinchiorri was published in 2013 entitled Pinchiorri a Due Voci (Eng: "The Pinchiorri Duet"), written by Leonardo Castelucci. In 2017, she appeared as one of the judges on the television series Top Chef Italia.
