= Nai Htaw Sorn =

- Born: Htaw Thwe; November 30, 1917; Kadaw village
- Disappeared: Paung Township
- Died: November 7, 2014 (aged 96); Yangon
- Education: BSc Chemistry
- Alma mater: Rangoon University
- Occupation: Politician
- Known for: Mon community leader
- Political party: Mon Unity Party
- Spouse: Mi Khun Htaw

Nai Htaw Sorn (Burmese name Nai Tun Thein) was a Mon political activist from Myanmar. He attended primary school in Kado Village and continued middle and high school in Moulmein.

== Education ==
In 1938, he passed High School with honors in several subjects and won the Collegiate Scholarship for five years. In 1940 he passed the first year of university examinations with honors in chemistry. Amid World War II, the university was closed until 1944. He received a Bachelor of Science degree in 1945. He was elected for scholarship at Chicago University, USA to continue his study in chemistry, but could not attend. From 1947 to 1949, he was the director of Kyaikhami Provision Education that comprised eight districts. At the same time he was elected as Secretary of All Ramanya Mon Association for Kyaikhami province.

== Political activities ==
From 1949 to 1958 he was an Executive Committee Member of Mon National Defence Organization (MNDO), at the same time served as Mon and Karen Special Representative for eight years based at the Thai Burma border. After MNDO entered into so called legal fold, changed arms for democracy in 1958, he continued his political activities under the constitution until the military coup led by Gen. Ne Win in 1962.

== Imprisonment ==
He was immediately arrested and put in jail for 6 years. After he was released from the jail he voluntarily taught stone inscription to the monks and university students. In 1985 he was appointed as the chairperson in the Higher Examination for the Buddhist monks. He has been extremely trying to preserve Mon culture and literature throughout his life. Nai Tun Thein was elected as the Chairman of the Mon National Democratic Front in 1988 and to run in election in 1990. In 1992, he was arrested by SLORC and released in 1994 but have to report to the authorities regularly. Since the mid of 1998, he was detained at the military guest house for several times. At the moment he is released from confinement in military guest house for his health.
