= Massimiliano Alajmo =

Italian chef

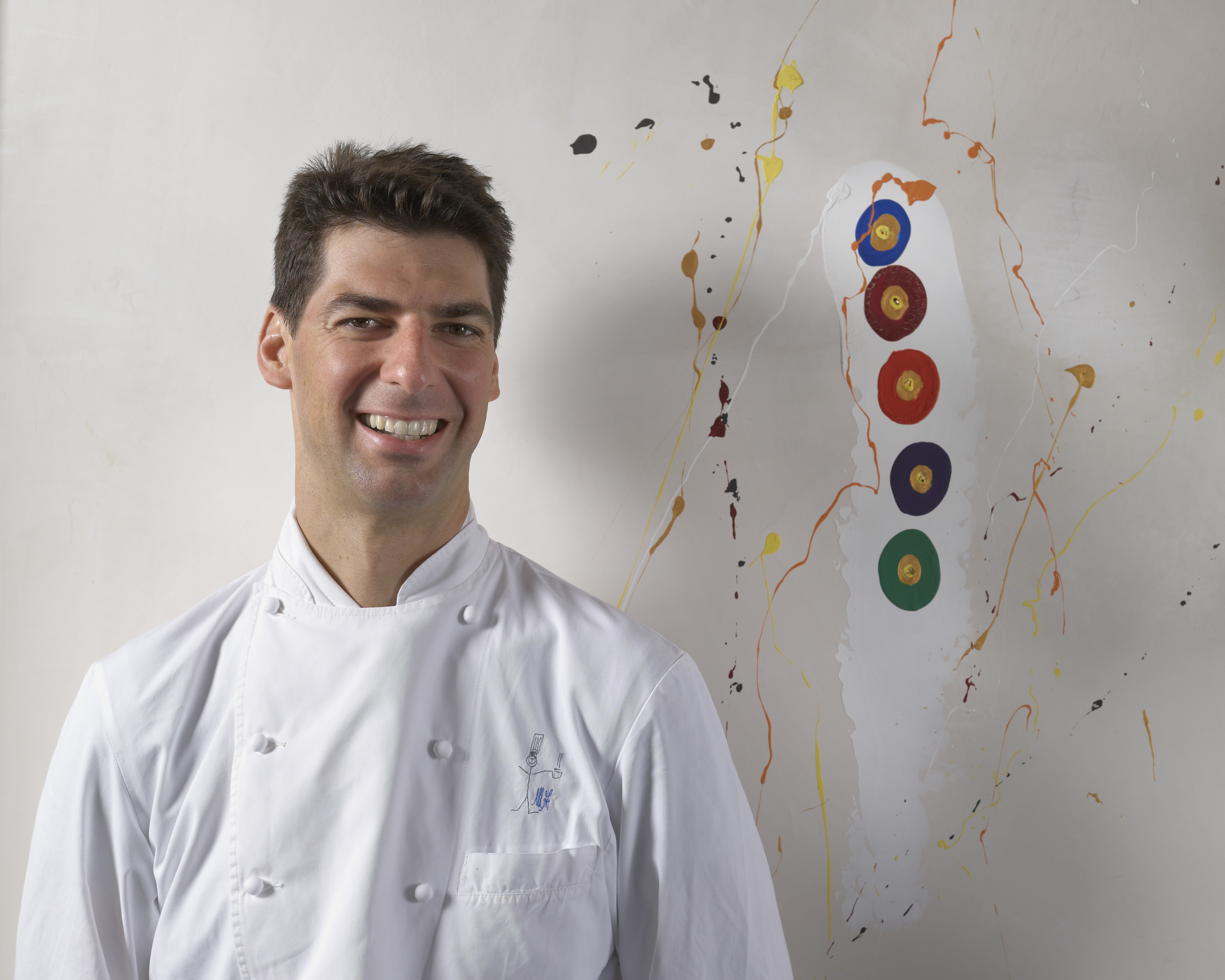
- Born: 6 May 1974 (age 52); Padua, Italy
- Culinary career
- Award won: Michelin Italy

Massimiliano Alajmo (born 6 May 1974) is an Italian chef. In 2002, at the age of 28, he became the youngest chef in history to be awarded three stars by the Michelin Guide.

== Biography ==
Massimiliano (Max) Alajmo is a part of the fifth generation of the Alajmo family self-employed as chefs and restaurateurs.

After attending hotel management school, Max furthered his culinary education in the kitchens of Alfredo Chiocchetti of Ja Navalge in Moena, Marc Veyrat of Auberge de l’Eridan in Veyrier-du-Lac, and Michel Guérard of Les Près d’Eugenie in Eugénie-les-Bains.

In 1993, he began working at Le Calandre in Sarmeola di Rubano (Padua) together with his mother, chef Rita Chimetto, who had earned the restaurant its first Michelin star the previous year. On 13 March 1994 he was appointed executive chef of Le Calandre; the restaurant was awarded a second star in the Michelin Guide 1997 and on 27 November 2002 it received its third, making Max, at 28, the youngest chef ever to obtain the recognition.

In 2006, the Alajmo brothers self-published their first cookbook, entitled “In.gredienti”, which won Best Cookbook in the World at the 2007 Gourmand International World Cookbook Awards. In 2008, Max worked with master perfumer Lorenzo Dante Ferro, studying the sense of smell as it relates to the dining experience. After more than a year of research, Max launched a line of pure essential oil sprays, Le Essenze, to be used as “taste accelerators”.

In early 2010, the Alajmo brothers remodelled the dining room of Le Calandre, using Max's culinary philosophy as their guide. They selected the materials to redecorate the dining room with the same focus and dedication that Max uses when sourcing ingredients. The remodel of the dining room also led to the creation of Alajmo Design, a line of objects (glasses, tableware, cutlery) designed by the Alajmo brothers and produced by renowned Italian craftsmen.

In January 2011, the Alajmo family took over Gran Caffè & Ristorante Quadri, located in St. Mark's Square, Venice and later the Caffè Stern in the Passage des Panoramas.

Since February 2013, Max has been a member of the board of directors and professor at the Master della Cucina Italiana, a culinary school developed to shape a new generation of chefs whose training goes beyond technique.

Currently, Max is the chef of Le Calandre and oversees the kitchens of his other restaurants, Quadri and La Montecchia, and the bistros Il Calandrino, abc Quadri and abc Montecchia. In addition, he is actively involved with Il Gusto per la Ricerca, a non-profit association founded by the Alajmo brothers in 2004, in order to collect funds in support of research to fight childhood illness.

In June 2020, he and other chefs, as well as architects, Nobel laureates in Economics and leaders of international organizations, signed the appeal in favour of the purple economy (“Towards a cultural renaissance of the economy”), published in Corriere della Sera, El País and Le Monde.

== Notes ==
- Willinger, Faith (2009-05-01). "Why This Man is My Favorite Chef in Italy". The Atlantic.
- Von Bremzen, Anya (2010–12) "Italy's Three-Star Boy Genius" Food & Wine
- Alajmo S.p.A. (2013) www.alajmo.it
