= Cheval Blanc St-Tropez =

Hotel in Saint-Tropez, France

Coordinates: 43°16′01″N 6°37′36″E

- Interactive map of the Cheval Blanc St-Tropez area

General information
- Location: Plage de la Bouillabaisse, Saint-Tropez

Design and construction
- Architect: Jean-Michel Wilmotte

Other information
- Number of rooms: 24
- Number of suites: 6

Website
- www.chevalblanc.com

Cheval Blanc St-Tropez is a luxury hotel in Saint-Tropez, France. One of its restaurants, La Vague d'Or is run by French chef Arnaud Donckele. The hotel is part of the Cheval Blanc collection since 2019, managed by LVMH group.

== Architecture ==
The hotel was opened in 1936. Known then as La Résidence de la Pinède, the hotel was purchased in 2016. It completed major renovations in 2018, with the help of French architect Jean-Michel Wilmotte, and was reopened as Cheval Blanc St-Tropez in 2019.

== Restaurants ==
Cheval Blanc St-Tropez has two restaurants and a bar, including La Terrasse and La Vague d'Or.

=== La Vague d'Or ===
Cheval Blanc St-Tropez gastronomical restaurant is run by French Chef Arnaud Donckele. It is awarded three stars by the Michelin Guide and five toques with a 19/20 rating on Gault Millau.

== Rooms and suites ==
The hotel in 2019 has 30 rooms and suites. Design was entrusted with Jean-Michel Wilmotte. Many of the rooms include Roger Capron ceramic artworks.

== Spa ==
The hotel includes a spa with four treatment rooms. Cheval Blanc Spa offers Guerlain products and procedures.
