= Jérôme Banctel =

French chef (born 1971)

- Born: 1 December 1971 (age 54); Rennes, Ille-et-Vilaine, France
- Culinary career
- Rating
- Michelin stars (2024)
- Current restaurant
- Le Gabriel (Paris)

Jérôme Banctel (French pronunciation: [ʒeʁom bɑ̃ktɛl], born 1 December 1971) is a French chef. He is the chef of the three starred restaurant Le Gabriel at the hotel La Réserve Paris.

== Life and career ==
Jérôme Banctel was born in Rennes in the department of Ille-et-Vilaine, and spent his childhood in Piré-sur-Seiche. At age 16, he entered the Notre-Dame hotel high school in Saint-Méen-le-Grand.

He began in 1991 with chef Michel Kéréver at the Duc d'Enghien in Enghien-les-Bains, then followed him at the restaurant Vreugt en Rust in the Netherlands. After his military service, he worked in the restaurant Le Jules Verne located at the Eiffel Tower, then joined Christian Constant at the restaurant Les Ambassadeurs at the Hôtel de Crillon. He then began sous-chef at the restaurant L'Ambroisie located Place des Vosges, where he stayed for ten years with chef Bernard Pacaud.

In 2005, Jérôme Banctel is approached by Alain Ducasse and then by Alain Senderens. In 2006, he became the executive chef at the Lucas Carton located Place de la Madeleine, and worked at the same period as a consulting chef for Mama Shelter.

In 2015, he became the executive chef of Le Gabriel, new restaurant opened by Michel Reybier, owner of the hotel La Réserve Paris. In 2016, less than a year after the opening, he obtained two Michelin stars. It is in this restaurant that Jérôme Banctel found his real culinary identity. At the time, he was perceived as a future three starred chef.

In 2020, Jérôme Banctel is one of the guest judges in an episode of the eleventh season of Top Chef broadcast on M6. He participates once again the next year in an episode of the twelfth season.

In March 2024, Banctel's Le Gabriel was one of two restaurants in France earning their three Michelin stars for the first time.
