= Ana Roš =

Slovene chef (born 1972)

- Born: 1972 (age 53–54); Šempeter pri Gorici, PR Slovenia, Yugoslavia
- Culinary career
- Cooking style: Nouvelle cuisine
- Rating: Michelin Guide
- Current restaurant: Hiša Franko
- Award(s) won: The World's 50 Best 2017 Best Female Chef

Ana Roš (born 1972) is a Slovene chef. Her restaurant Hiša Franko, located in Kobarid, Slovenia, in the Soča Valley, was awarded three Michelin stars in 2023, the first Slovenian restaurant so recognized. She has no formal culinary training.

== Early life and education ==
Roš was born in 1972 and grew up in Tolmin, Slovenia. Her father, Bojan, is a physician and her mother, Katja, a journalist. She has a sister, Maja, who is a journalist. She trained in alpine skiing as a child, earning a place in the Yugoslavian youth national team, but later decided she didn't want a professional career in skiing. She studied diplomacy in Gorizia, Italy, at the University of Trieste.

== Career ==
The family of Roš's then-partner, Valter Kramar, owned the restaurant Hiša Franko. Kramar's parents retired, and the couple took over the family restaurant, with Roš working as a server and Kramar became a sommelier. In 2002 Roš, who has no formal culinary training, took over the kitchen, learning to cook with the help of her mother-in-law and a family friend.

In 2022 she opened the bakery Pekarna Ana in Ljubljana. In 2023, she opened Jaz, a bistro, also in Ljubljana.

Roš's cooking style focuses on local ingredients. According to The New York Times, nearly every ingredient used at Hiša Franko is sourced within 50 kilometres (31 mi) of the restaurant. Roš characterizes her own approach as "technical, almost scientific." She has said she has a preference for serving raw food, especially vegetables.

== Recognition ==
According to Elise Morton, writing for the BBC in 2021, Roš is "at least in part" responsible for Slovenia "becoming one of Europe’s prime gastronomic destinations".

In 2010, Roš was featured in the Italian culinary magazine Identità Golose. She was a guest chef of the Ikarus restaurant in Hangar-7 in Salzburg, Austria, and the Gelinaz Grand Shuffle in New York City.

In 2016, Roš was featured in the Netflix documentary Chef's Table. The following year, she was named world's best female chef by The World's 50 Best Restaurants academy. In 2019, Travel + Leisure and Food & Wine named Hiša Franko one of the world's 30 best restaurants.

Hiša Franko was awarded two Michelin stars as Michelin Guide presented its first ever rating for Slovenia in 2020. In addition, her restaurant was specially noted for sustainability. In 2023, Hiša Franko was awarded three stars by Michelin Guide, the first Slovenian restaurant so recognized, and a green star for sustainability.

== Personal life ==
Roš and Kramar split in 2017; they have two children. She married Urban Stojan in 2022. As of 2023 she lives in the Soča Valley. She speaks seven languages, including English, Italian, French, and Spanish.

== Bibliography ==
- Sun and Rain. 2020. London: Phaidon. ISBN 978-0714879307
