= Fontjoncouse =

Commune in Occitanie, France

- Commune
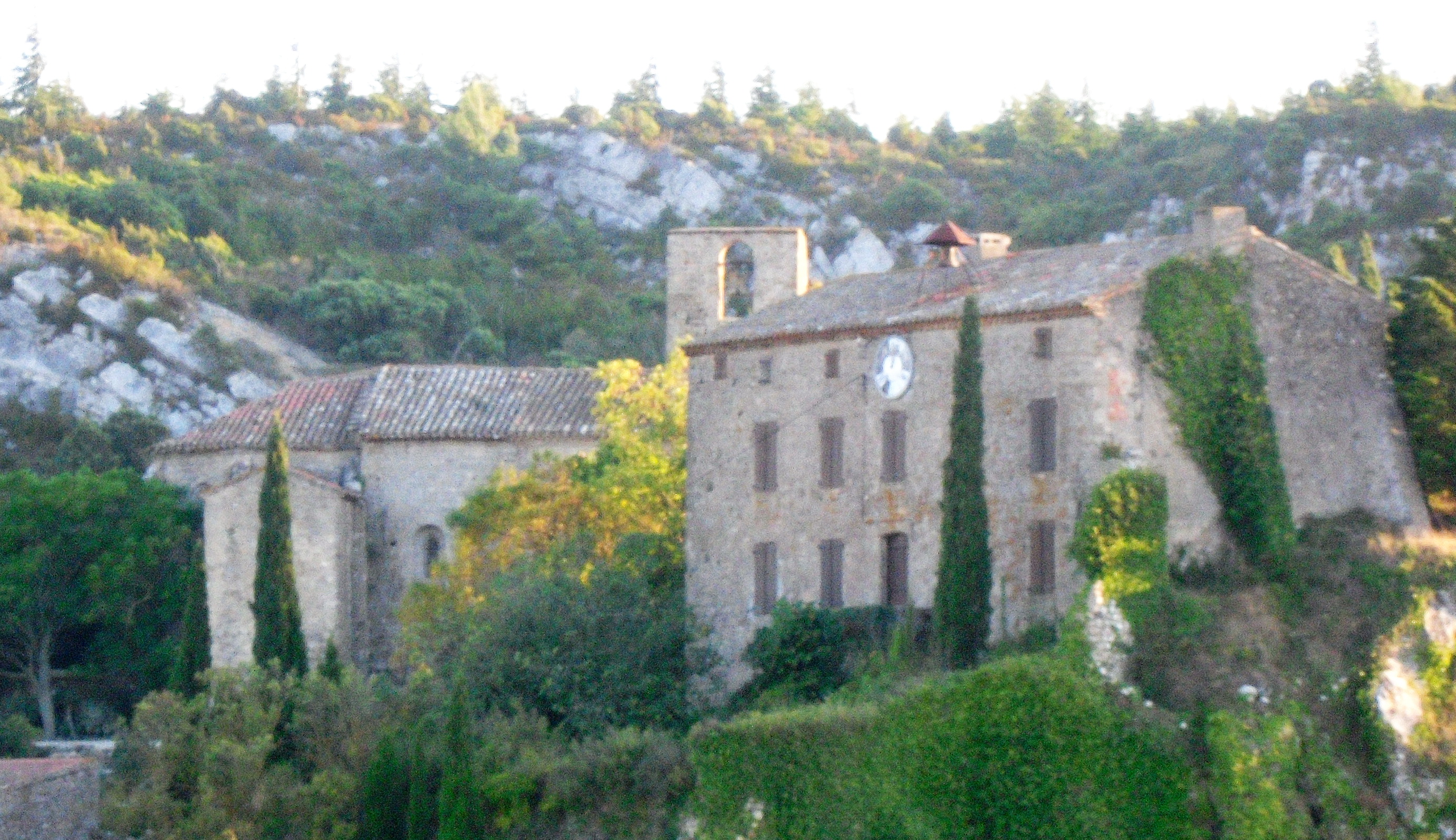
- The chateau and church in Fontjoncouse

- Coat of arms
- Location of Fontjoncouse
- Location within France Location within Occitanie
- Coordinates: 43°02′57″N 2°47′21″E
- Country: France
- Region: Occitania
- Department: Aude
- Arrondissement: Narbonne
- Canton: Les Corbières
- Intercommunality: Corbières Salanque Méditerranée

Government
  - Mayor (2020–2026): Christophe Tena
- Area^{1}: 27.35 km^{2} (10.56 sq mi)
- Elevation: 307 m (1,007 ft)
- Highest elevation: 420 m (1,380 ft)
- Lowest elevation: 69 m (226 ft)
- Population (2023): 139
  - Density: 5.08/km^{2} (13.2/sq mi)
- Time zone: UTC+01:00 (CET)
  - Summer (DST): UTC+02:00 (CEST)
- INSEE/Postal code: 11152 /11360
- ^{1} French Land Register data, which excludes lakes, ponds, glaciers > 1 km^{2} (0.386 sq mi or 247 acres) and river estuaries.

Fontjoncouse (French pronunciation: [fɔ̃ʒɔ̃kuz]; Occitan: Fontjoncosa) is a commune in the Aude department in southern France.

Fontjoncouse has gained a reputation in the culinary world, as it is the location of Gilles Goujon's three-Michelin starred restaurant, L'Auberge du Vieux Puits.

== Population ==
Historical population
| Year | Pop. | ±% p.a. |
|---|---|---|
| 1968 | 141 | — |
| 1975 | 110 | −3.48% |
| 1982 | 91 | −2.67% |
| 1990 | 102 | +1.44% |
| 1999 | 119 | +1.73% |
| 2007 | 134 | +1.50% |
| 2012 | 149 | +2.14% |
| 2017 | 131 | −2.54% |
| 2023 | 139 | +0.99% |
Source: INSEE

== See also ==
- Corbières AOC
- Communes of the Aude department
