= Le Calandre =

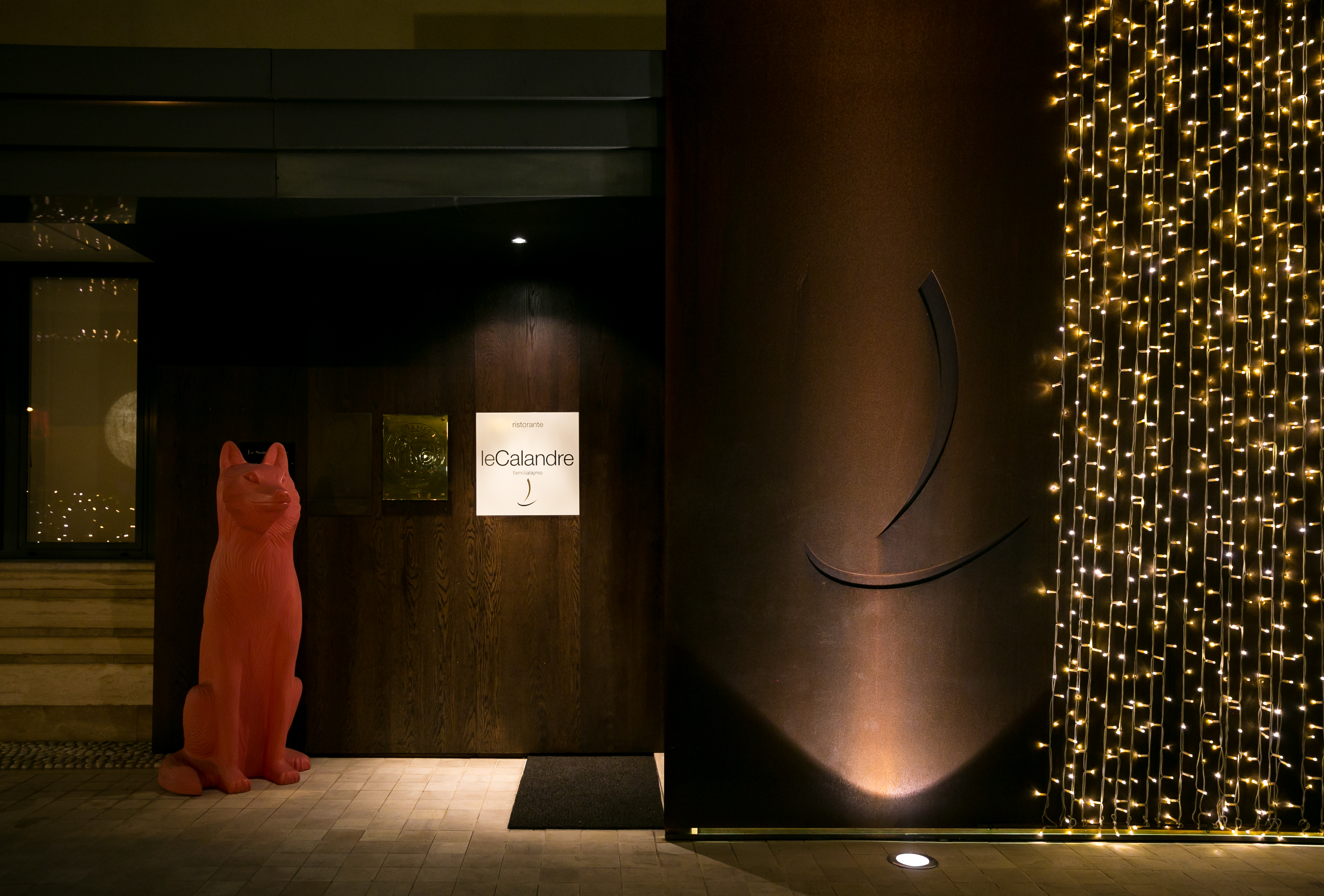
- Interactive map of Le Calandre

Restaurant information
- Established: 1981
- Owners: Rafaele Alajmo & Massimiliano Alajmo
- Previous owners: Erminio Alajmo and Rita Chimetto
- Head chef: Massimiliano Alajmo
- Food type: Contemporary Italian
- Rating: (Michelin Guide)
- Location: Via Liguria, 1, Sarmeola di Rubano, Province of Padua, Veneto, 35030, Italy
- Coordinates: 45.421703°N 11.809572°E
- Website: alajmo.it

Le Calandre is a restaurant in the village of Sarmeola di Rubano 6 kilometres (3.7 mi) west of Padua, Italy.

== History ==
Opened in 1981 by Erminio Alajmo and his wife Rita Chimetto, the restaurant gained its first Michelin star in 1992 with Chimetto as chef de cuisine. Their son, Massimiliano Alajmo, took over the restaurant in 1994, and only two years later in December 1996, the restaurant gained its second star and the then 22-year-old Alajmo became the youngest chef with two Michelin stars.

When the restaurant gained its third Michelin star in November 2002, an award only given to "exceptional cuisine with distinctive dishes, precisely executed using superlative ingredients, and worth a special journey", Alajmo at the age of 28 became the youngest three-star Michelin chef of all time. Le Calandre has retained their three Michelin stars ever since.

== Recognition ==
The restaurant has consistently been voted among The World's 50 Best Restaurants every year since 2006, and is ranked as number 29 on Restaurant's 2017 list. Forbes included Le Calandre on their list of "The 16 Coolest Places To Eat In 2016".

Le Calandre has been described as "one of Italy's most cutting-edge restaurants", that "is consistently judged by major restaurant critics as one of the two or three best restaurants in the country.", and Head Chef Alajmo has earned the nickname "The Mozart of the stoves" (Il Mozart dei fornelli). Food critic Andy Hayler in his review of a 2012 visit to Le Calandre, concluded by saying: "This was a genuinely memorable meal, one of the best I have eaten. This is truly a restaurant at the pinnacle of culinary achievement.", and concluded his review the following year by saying: "Le Calandre is without doubt one of the top restaurants of the world."

In 2010, Le Calandre underwent a major refurbishment, and abandoned the use of white tablecloths for raw wooden tables.

== See also ==
- List of Michelin-starred restaurants in Italy
