= Contemporary (disambiguation) =

Contemporary is the historical period that is immediately relevant to the present and is a certain perspective of modern history.

Contemporary may also refer to:

- Contemporary philosophy
- Contemporary art, post-World War II art
- Contemporary dance, a modern genre of concert dance
- Contemporary literature, post-World War II literature
- Contemporary music, post-World War II music
- Contemporary (magazine), an art magazine
- Contemporary Records, a jazz record label

== See also ==
- Contemporary classical music, post-World War II classical music
- Contemporary Christian music, modern Christian faith music
- Contemporary R&B, modern rhythm and blues
- Urban contemporary, music radio format
- Contemporary hit radio, Top 40 radio format
- Adult contemporary music, adult music radio format
- Disney's Contemporary Resort, resort hotel located at the Walt Disney World Resort, opened in 1971
