= Hiša Franko =

Fine dining restaurant in Slovenia

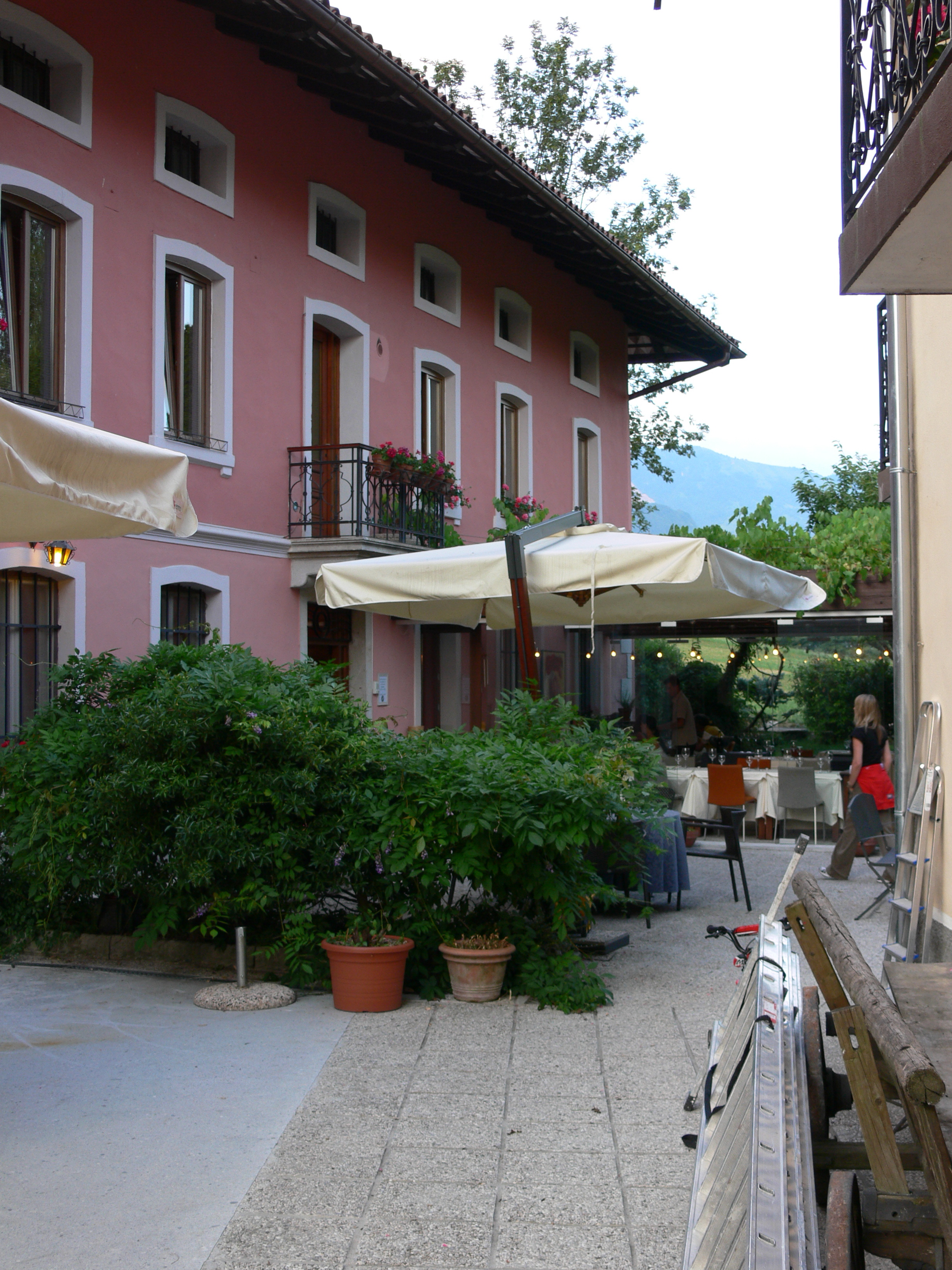
- Patio of Hiša Franko in 2006
- Interactive map of Hiša Franko

Restaurant information
- Established: 1970s
- Owners: Ana Roš; Valter Kramar
- Head chef: Ana Roš
- Rating: 3 Michelin stars 1 Michelin green star
- Location: Kobarid, Slovenia
- Coordinates: 46°14′50″N 13°32′16″E
- Website: www.hisafranko.com

Hiša Franko (Note: Slovene pronunciation: [xìːʃa fràːnkɔ].) is a three-Michelin star restaurant in Kobarid, western Slovenia. Its kitchen is led by chef Ana Roš. It has appeared regularly in The World's 50 Best Restaurants list since 2017.

The restaurant building was erected in 1860 and spent time as a farmhouse and a World War I hospital before being abandoned. In the 1970s, the property was converted into a restaurant and guest house by Franko Kramar and named Hiša Franko, which means "House Franko". In 2000, ownership passed to Kramar's son, Valter Kramar, and his then partner Roš. After the departure of the head chef, Roš, who has no formal culinary training, took over the kitchen. Valter Kramar developed the wine program, with a focus on Slovenian wines. In 2016, Hiša Franko and Ana Roš were featured in the Netflix documentary series Chef's Table.

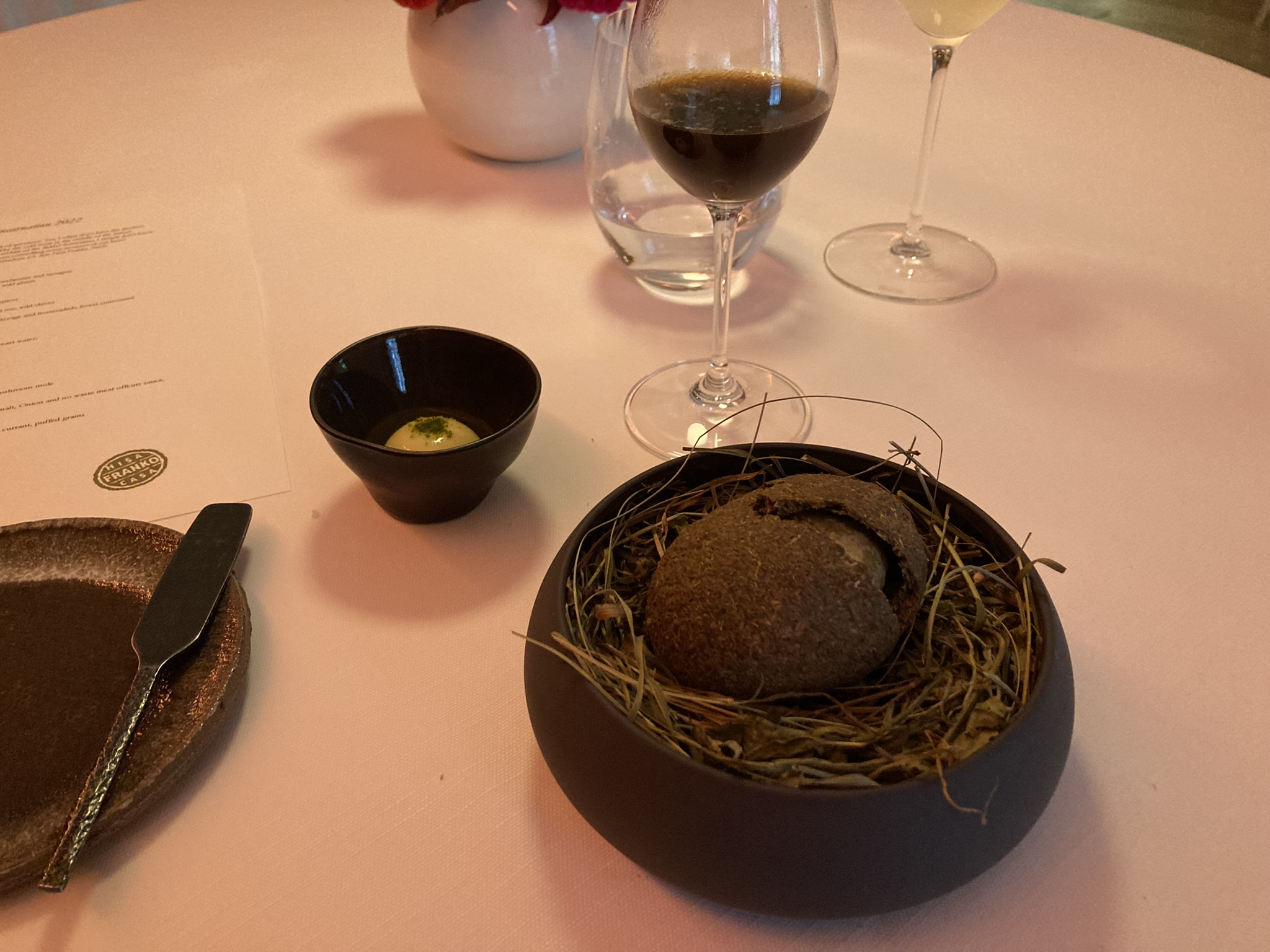
A potato baked in a crust of August hay, served with cultured butter with lovage and horseradish and a forest consommé was a dish on Hiša Franko's summer 2022 tasting menu.

The restaurant's cooking is closely connected to the Soča Valley, using seasonal produce and ingredients from local foragers, shepherds, cheesemakers, hunters, and fishermen. Menus often include wild herbs, mountain dairy products, river trout, game, berries, and mushrooms. Critics have described the style as farm-to-table and rooted in regional tradition while incorporating broader culinary influences. Gault Millau named it and Pri Lojzetu as Slovenia's joint-best restaurants in November 2018, while the Michelin Guide awarded Hiša Franko two stars and a Green Star for sustainability in 2020, when it first covered the country. In 2023, it became the first Slovenian restaurant to earn three Michelin stars, making Roš one of the few women with that accolade.

== Reception ==
- 2019 – Named Restaurant of the Year by Gault & Millau Slovenia.
- 2020 – Awarded two Michelin stars and one Green Star for sustainability in the Michelin Guide Slovenia.
- 2023 – Awarded three Michelin stars and one Green Star for sustainability (the first restaurant in Slovenia with three stars).

== See also ==
- List of Michelin-starred restaurants in Slovenia

== See also ==
- List of Michelin-starred restaurants in Slovenia
