= Stefan Stiller =

German chef and restaurateur (born 1966)

- Born: 5 May 1966 (age 60); Celle, Germany
- Culinary career
- Current restaurants
- Taian Table, Shanghai, China, Taian Table, Guangzhou, China, Stiller, Guangzhou, China

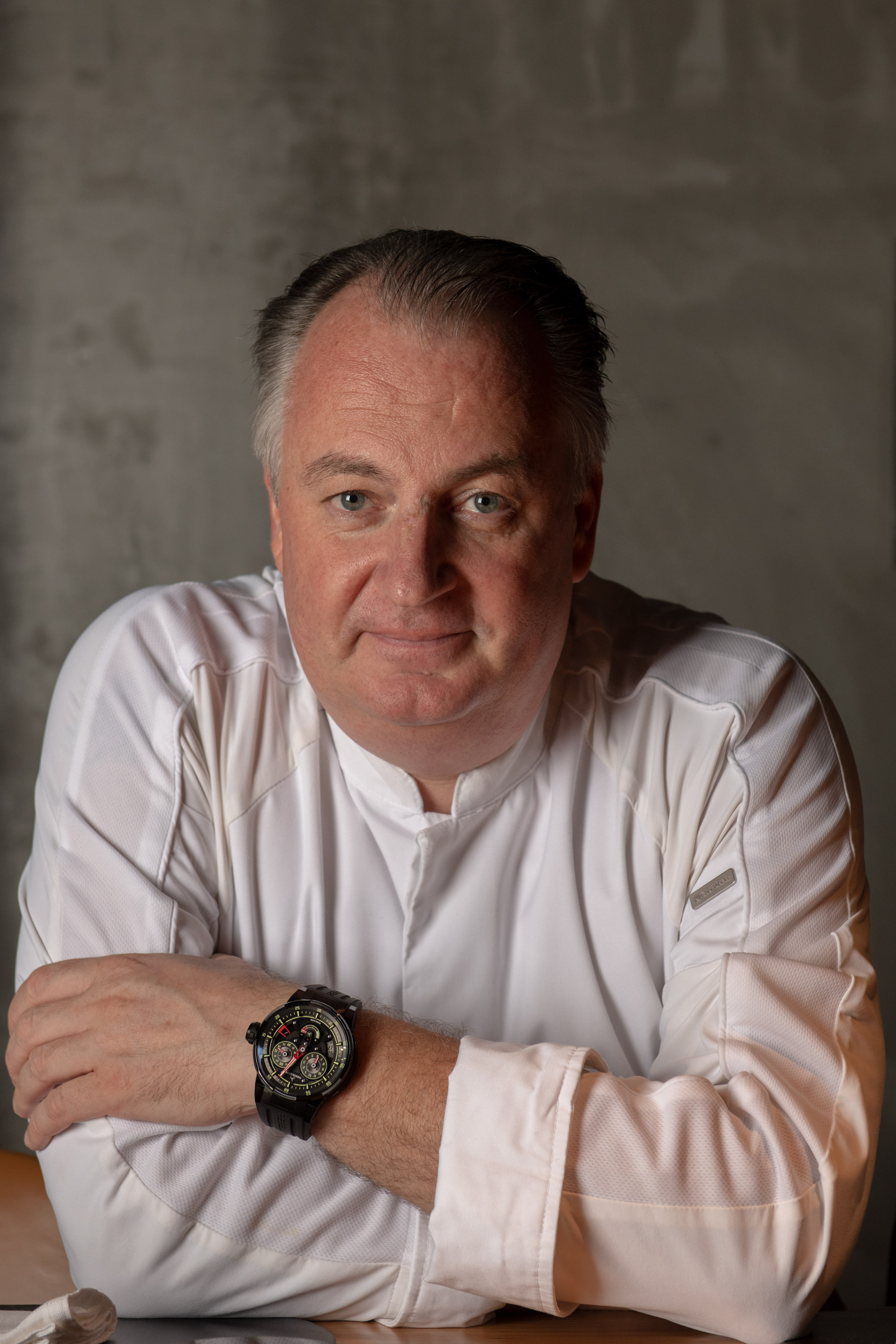
Stefan Stiller

Stefan Stiller is a German chef and restaurateur. He is the chef-owner of Taian Table, a fine dining restaurant in Shanghai, China that holds three Michelin Stars. He is also president of Bocuse d'Or Team China and Asia Pacific.

== Career ==
Stiller began his culinary career in 1983 with a 2.5-year apprenticeship at Restaurant Endtenfang at the Hotel Fürstenhof, in his hometown of Celle, Germany. Before joining mandatory army service, Stiller staged for several months at Restaurant Goldener Pflug in Cologne, the second restaurant in Germany to receive three Michelin stars.

Following two years of army service, Stiller joined the 2-Michelin-starred restaurant Schweizer Stuben in Wertheim-Bettingen. In 1989, he returned to his hometown Celle and became owner and chef of Restaurant l'Auberge. In 1998, Stiller moved to Deidesheim and took over as chef-de-cuisine at the 1-Michelin-starred Restaurant Schwarzer Hahn. While working there, he noticed a closed building in the winery across the street, a historic property built in 1374, and home to the oldest restaurant in the area, which opened in 1532. A year later, Stiller opened his own fine dining restaurant in this building, named Restaurant Grand Cru, and received one Michelin star.

In 2004, Stiller moved to Shanghai, China and became executive chef first at Club Shanghai, and then at Mimosa Supperclub from 2005 to 2007. In 2008, he launched his own project, Stiller's Restaurant and Cooking School, where Stiller personally gave cooking lessons to the public. In 2012, he became partner of La Cocotte Restaurant in Hangzhou, China, a concept restaurant for Staub cocottes. In 2015 he opened EAST Eatery, a modern Asian restaurant in Shanghai's Tianzifang.

In 2016, Stiller opened the Taian Table restaurant on Tai'an Road in Shanghai, which received one Michelin star 5 months after opening. Due to permit issues, the restaurant moved to Zhenning Road in December 2016. Taian Table was awarded the second Michelin Star in 2019 and the third in November 2021. Since January 2021 Taian Table became a Member of ‘Les Grandes Tables du Monde’. In April 2021 Stefan Stiller opened a branch of Taian Table in Guangzhou and also re-launched Stiller as a restaurant concept inside the Guangzhou Garden Hotel. Taian Table Guangzhou received 2 Michelin Stars in the 2021 Michelin Guangzhou guide in September 2021.

== Bocuse d'Or ==
Stiller is currently president of Bocuse d’Or Team China and Contest President for the Asia Pacific Final.

During the preparation for a Bocuse d'Or press conference in 2009, to be held at his Shanghai restaurant Stiller's, he discovered that there was no candidate for China in the Asia-Pacific regional selection. Thus, he took it upon himself to recruit and train a candidate. Under Stiller's guidance, Team China placed second in that year's Asia-Pacific Continental Selection, and qualified for the Finale in Lyon, France in 2011. In subsequent years, Team China qualified for the world finale another 3 times, in 2013, 2017, and 2019.

In 2018, Stiller organized the Bocuse d'Or Asia-Pacific Continental Selection in Guangzhou, China as Contest President.
