= Supaksorn Jongsiri =

- ศุภักษร จงศิริ
- Born: Bangkok, Thailand

Supaksorn "Ice" Jongsiri (Thai: ศุภักษร จงศิริ (ไอซ์)) is a Thai chef and owner of Sorn, a Southern Thai restaurant in Bangkok, Thailand. In 2024, Sorn became the first restaurant in Thailand to receive three Michelin stars.

== Early life and education ==
Supaksorn was born in Bangkok and raised in Nakhon Si Thammarat province by his grandmother. He studied design in the United States before returning to Thailand. Supaksorn's family owned restaurants in Bangkok, including Baan Ice, which serves traditional family recipes.

== Career ==
In 2018, Supaksorn opened Sorn alongside childhood friend chef Yodkwan U-Pumpruk. The restaurant offers a seasonal menu with ingredients sourced from Southern Thailand. Sorn won its first Michelin star in 2019. The restaurant was named second on the 2022 Asia's 50 Best Restaurants List.
