= Edsbacka krog =

Restaurant in Sollentuna Municipality, Stockholm County, Sweden

Coordinates: 59°26′26.5″N 17°57′2.5″E

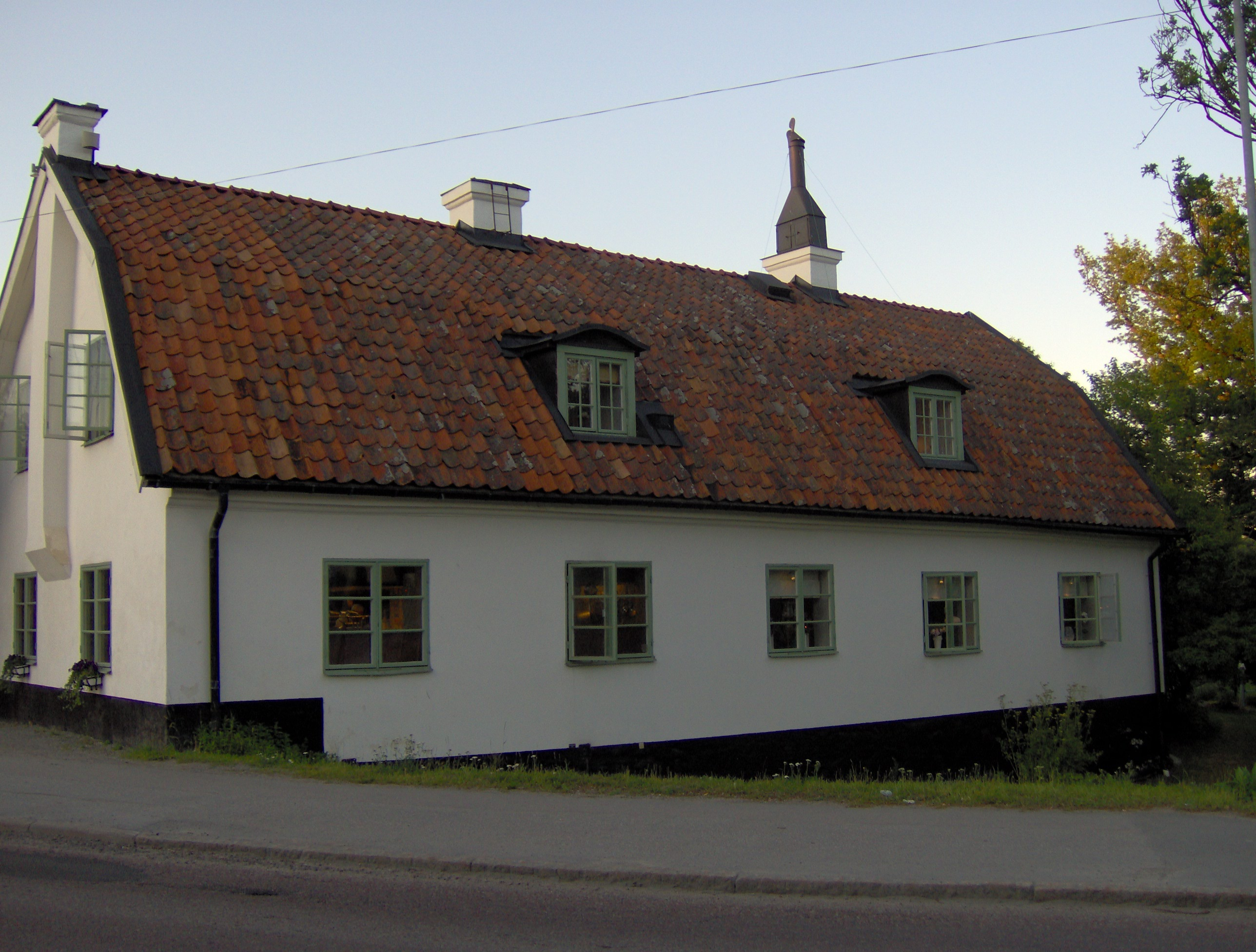
Edsbacka krog

Edsbacka krog ("Edsbacka inn") is a restaurant on the banks of the Edsviken in Sollentuna, Sweden, just north of Stockholm. It closed in February 2010, and was then one of two Swedish restaurants with two stars in the Michelin Guide.

== History ==
The restaurant was founded in 1626 by Henrik Olofsson, who got permission from King Gustav II Adolf to build an inn at Edsbacka, next to the road that runs between Stockholm and Uppsala. The inn closed in 1872, and the buildings stood abandoned for many years. After having located it as the oldest existing inn building in Sweden, chef Christer Lingström reopened Edsbacka krog after renovations in 1983. In 1985, he won the Swedish award "chef of the year", and was awarded one star in the Michelin Guide in 1992, and two stars in 2000. Edsbacka was the first Swedish restaurant ever to receive a second star, and until 2009 was the only restaurant with this distinction. On November 1, 2008 Lingström retired from Edsbacka, which was taken over by the staff under then-head chef Fredrik Pettersson.

In November 2009 Lingström announced that Edsbacka krog would be closing down its operation on February 27, 2010, while Edsbacka Bistro, situated on the other side of the road, will remain. In connection with the change of ownership in December 2020 and subsequent transformation, the name has returned to Edsbacka Krog.
