= Tinqueux =

- Commune
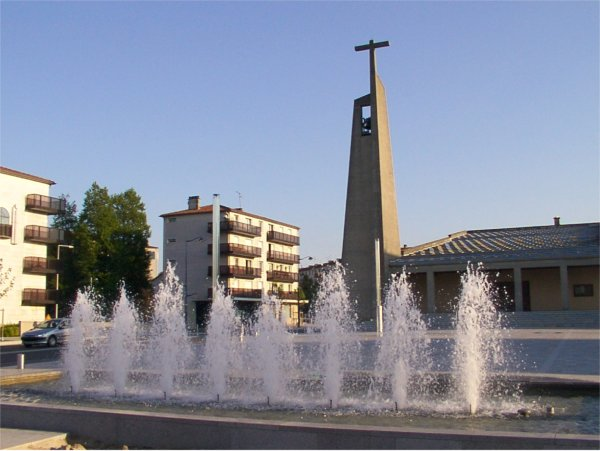
- The church in Tinqueux

- Coat of arms
- Location of Tinqueux
- Location within France Location within Grand Est
- Coordinates: 49°15′03″N 3°59′30″E
- Country: France
- Region: Grand Est
- Department: Marne
- Arrondissement: Reims
- Canton: Reims-4
- Intercommunality: CU Grand Reims

Government
  - Mayor (2020–2026): Jean-Pierre Fortuné
- Area^{1}: 4.15 km^{2} (1.60 sq mi)
- Elevation: 78 m (256 ft)
- Population (2023): 10,771
  - Density: 2,600/km^{2} (6,720/sq mi)
- Time zone: UTC+01:00 (CET)
  - Summer (DST): UTC+02:00 (CEST)
- INSEE/Postal code: 51573 /51430
- Website: site internet
- ^{1} French Land Register data, which excludes lakes, ponds, glaciers > 1 km^{2} (0.386 sq mi or 247 acres) and river estuaries.

Tinqueux (French pronunciation: [tɛ̃kø]) is a commune in the Marne department in north-eastern France. It is a suburb, adjacent to the west of Reims. Tinqueux is twinned with Myślenice, Poland.

== Population ==
Historical population
Year	Pop.	±% p.a.
1968	7,394	—
1975	8,615	+2.21%
1982	8,014	−1.03%
1990	10,154	+3.00%
1999	10,083	−0.08%
2007	10,231	+0.18%
2012	10,081	−0.29%
2017	10,030	−0.10%
2023	10,771	+1.20%
Source: INSEE

== See also ==
- Communes of the Marne department
- List of twin towns and sister cities in France
