= Sorn (restaurant) =

Sorn ศรณ์
- Interactive map of Sorn ศรณ์

Restaurant information
- Established: June 2018
- Head chef: Supaksorn 'Ice' Jongsiri
- Food type: Southern Thai
- Rating: (Michelin Guide)
- Location: 56 Soi Sukhumvit 26, Khlong Tan, Khlong Toei, Bangkok, 10110, Thailand
- Coordinates: 13.7231°N 100.5685°E
- Website: sornfinesouthern.com

Sorn (Thai: ศรณ์) is a restaurant in Bangkok specializing in Southern Thai cuisine.

== History ==
Founded by Supaksorn 'Ice' Jongsiri, Sorn is the first restaurant in Thailand to receive three stars in the eighth edition of the Michelin Guide Thailand 2025. Sorn was ranked 2nd on 2022's list of Asia's 50 Best Restaurants.

Located in a restored two-story mansion in Khlong Toei, Sorn sources nearly all of its ingredients from Southern Thailand. Even the water and coal used for cooking are sourced from the South. The restaurant also heavily relies on traditional techniques, such as pounding chili paste by hand and cooking rice in a clay pot.
