= Nouvelle cuisine =

Approach to food cooking and presentation

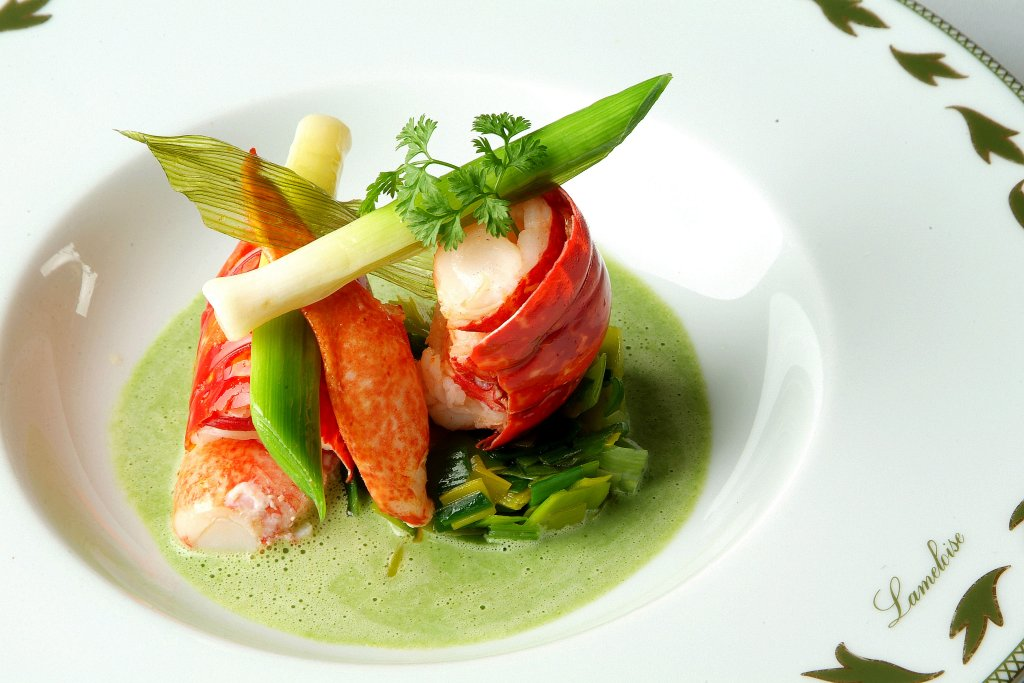
An example of nouvelle cuisine presentation

Nouvelle cuisine (French: [nuvɛl kɥizin], 'new cuisine') is an approach to cooking and food presentation in French cuisine. In contrast to cuisine classique, an older form of haute cuisine, nouvelle cuisine is characterized by lighter, more delicate dishes and an increased emphasis on presentation. It was popularized in the 1960s by the food critic Henri Gault, who coined the phrase, and his colleagues André Gayot and Christian Millau in a new restaurant guide, the Gault Millau, or Le Nouveau Guide.

== History ==
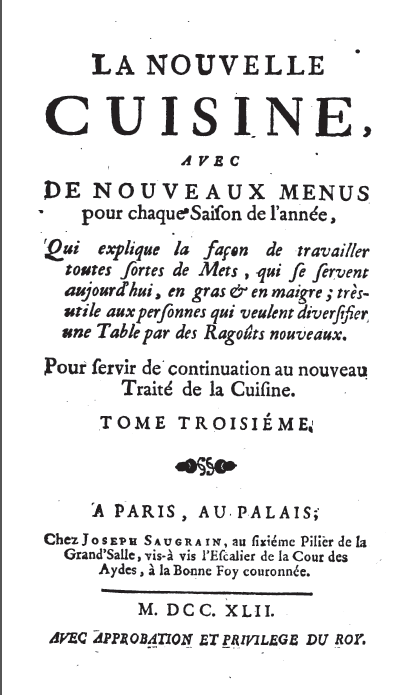
Menon, La nouvelle cuisine (1742)

The term nouvelle cuisine has been used several times in the history of French cuisine, to mark a clean break with the past.

In the 1730s and 1740s, several French writers emphasized their break with tradition, calling their cooking "modern" or "new". Vincent La Chapelle published his Cuisinier moderne in 1733–1735. The first volumes of Menon's Nouveau traité de la cuisine was published in 1739. It was in 1742 that Menon introduced the term nouvelle cuisine as the title of the third volume of his Nouveau traité. François Marin worked in the same tradition.

In the 1880s and 1890s, the cooking of Georges Auguste Escoffier was sometimes described with the term.

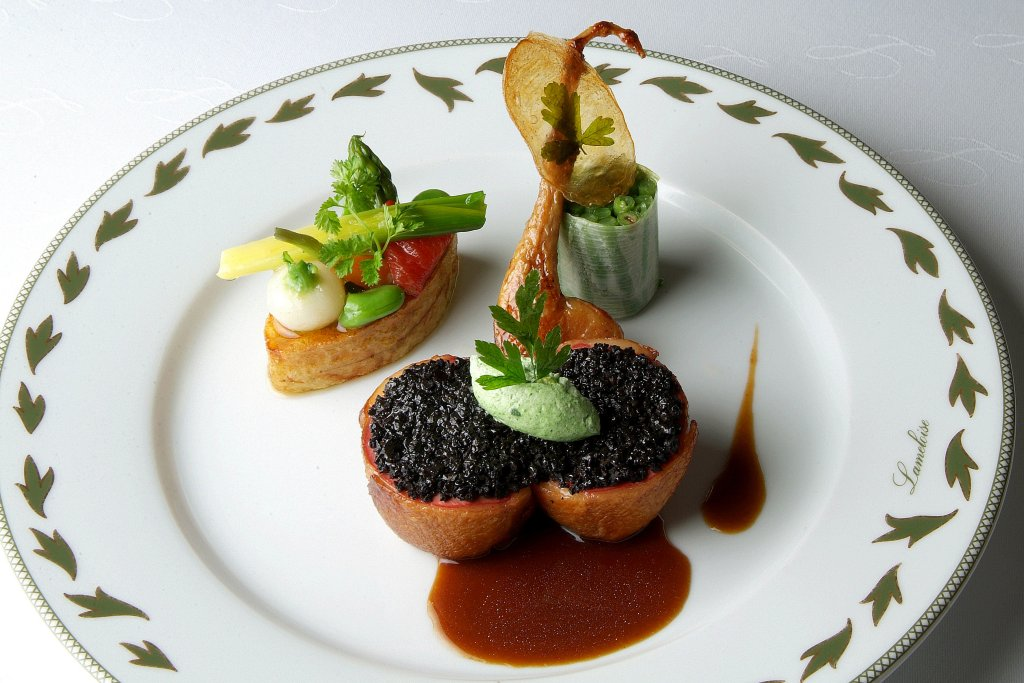
A Jacques Lameloise (a three-star Michelin Guide chef) nouvelle cuisine presentation

The modern usage is variously attributed to authors Henri Gault, Christian Millau, and André Gayot, who used nouvelle cuisine to describe the cooking of Paul Bocuse, Alain Chapel, Jean and Pierre Troisgros, Michel Guérard, Roger Vergé, and Raymond Oliver, many of whom were once students of Fernand Point. Paul Bocuse claimed that Gault first used the term to describe food prepared by Bocuse and other top chefs for the maiden flight of the Concorde airliner in 1969.

The style Gault and Millau wrote about was a reaction to the French cuisine classique placed into "orthodoxy" by Escoffier. Calling for greater simplicity and elegance in creating dishes, nouvelle cuisine is not cuisine minceur ('thin cooking'), which was created by Michel Guérard as spa food. It has been speculated that the outbreak of World War II was a significant contributor to nouvelle cuisine's creation—the short supply of animal protein during the German occupation made it a natural development.

== The "formula" ==
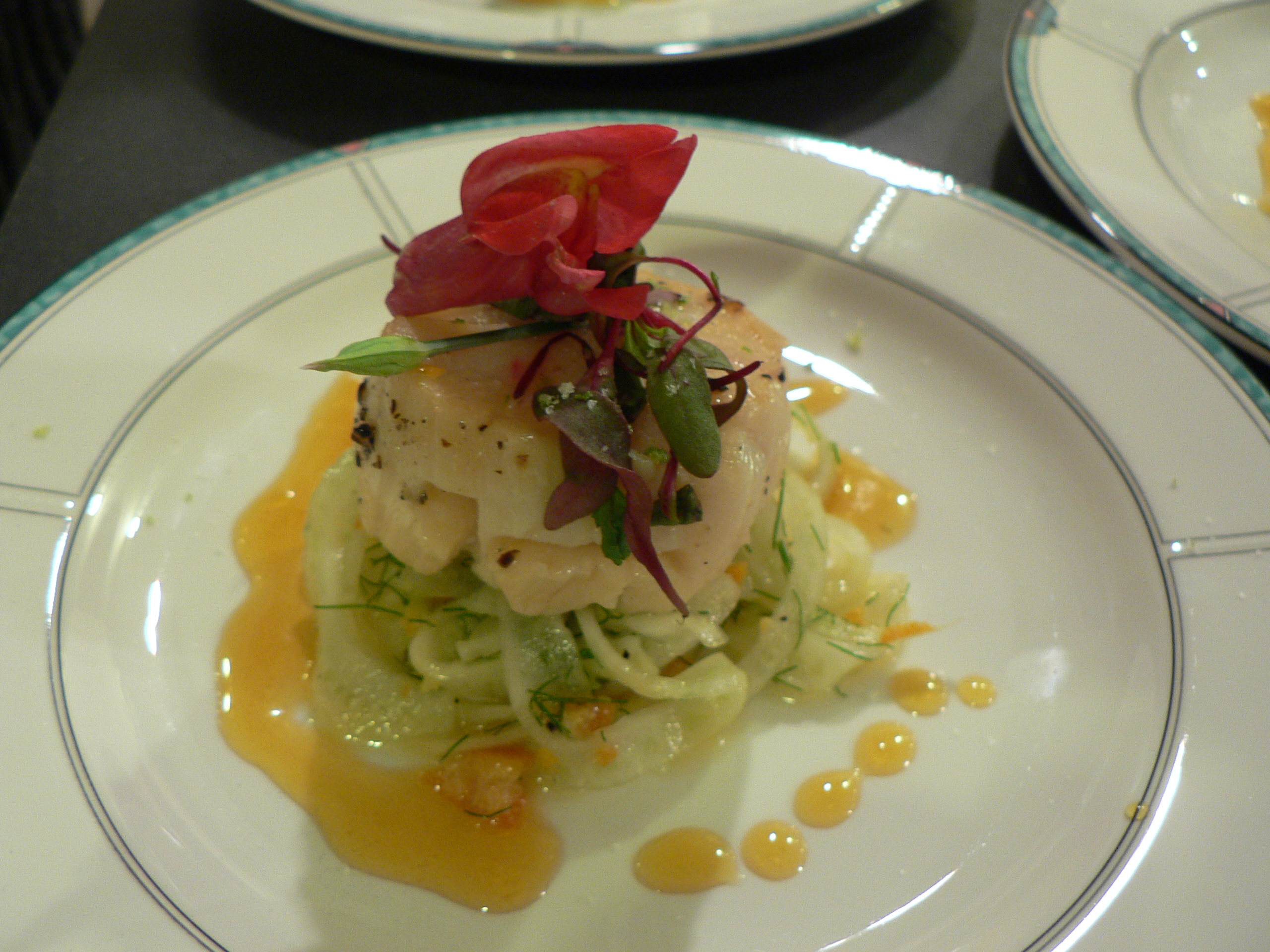
Scallop tangerine gastrique

Gault and Millau discovered the "formula" contained in ten characteristics of this new style of cooking. The ten characteristics identified were:

- A rejection of excessive complication in cooking.
- Cooking times for most fish, seafood, game birds, veal, green vegetables, and pâtés were greatly reduced in an attempt to preserve their natural flavours. Steaming was an important trend from this characteristic.
- The cuisine was made with the freshest possible ingredients.
- Large menus were abandoned in favour of shorter menus.
- Strong marinades for meat and game ceased to be used.
- Heavy sauces such as espagnole and béchamel were replaced by seasonings with fresh herbs, high-quality butter, lemon juice, and vinegar.
- Regional dishes replaced cuisine classique as a source of inspiration.
- New techniques were embraced and modern equipment was often used; Bocuse even used microwave ovens.
- The chefs paid close attention to the dietary needs of their guests through their dishes.
- The chefs were extremely inventive and created new combinations and pairings.

== Abandonment ==
There is a standing debate as to whether nouvelle cuisine has been abandoned. Much of what it stood for—particularly its preference for lightly presented, fresh flavours—has been assimilated into mainstream restaurant cooking. By the mid-1980s, some food writers stated that the style of cuisine had reached exhaustion and many chefs began returning to the cuisine classique style of cooking, although much of the lighter presentations and new techniques remained.

== Sources ==
- Hewitt, Nicholas. The Cambridge Companion to Modern French Culture. Cambridge: The Cambridge University Press, 2003. ISBN 978-0-521-79465-7.
- Mennel, Stephan. All Manners of Food: eating and taste in England and France from the Middle Ages to the present. 2nd ed., Chicago: University of Illinois Press, 1996. ISBN 978-0-252-06490-6.
- Patrick Rambourg, Histoire de la cuisine et de la gastronomie françaises, Paris, Ed. Perrin (coll. tempus n° 359), 2010, 381 pages. ISBN 978-2-262-03318-7.
