= Club des Cent =

Gastronomic association

The Club des Cent ("Club of One Hundred") brings together distinguished gastronomes such as Curnonsky, Henri Gault, Christian Millau and Doyon. This club is also known as the Compagnons de Cocagne.

As its name indicates, the Club has exactly one hundred official members. In addition, there are a few trainees, as well as foreign and honorary members. Founded in 1912 by Louis Forest, the club engages in various activities focused on gastronomy. The members meet weekly, every Thursday from 12:30pm to 2:30pm precisely, formerly at Maxim's on rue Royale in Paris. In addition to the weekly meals, foreign trips are also organized.

Around 2011, the Club des Cent (club of 100) club decided to move its general assembly to another restaurant than Maxim's, shocking the press, as they'd been at Maxim's for a long time.

== Description ==
Tradition dictates that a "Brigadier" take care of every aspect of the meal; each week a different member holds the office of Brigadier. At the end of each meeting, an assessment is made of the quality of the meal. These meetings are exclusive to the members, but two events per year are open to friends and spouses, the Spring Dinner and the Ceremony for the General Assembly. Every year, the Club des Cent crowns two chefs and offers them a certificate, considered quite prestigious in the world of gastronomy. Once a year, the members of the Club are given a ranking.

== Membership ==
It was founded by journalist Louis Forest, with women not admitted at the annual gala dinner. Recruitment balances professions and ages of men, including various chief executive officers and businessmen, and lawyers and journalists such as Philippe Bouvard and Jean Tulard. Also actors, medical professors, and only five chefs: chefs Paul Bocuse, Alain Ducasse, Joël Robuchon, Bernard Pacaud, Jean-Pierre Vigato were invited in as honorary members. Being admitted became a privilege coveted among France's wealthy people, with Raymond Barre a member.

In 2011, to apply one needed sponsorship by two members, be active, and not be over 65 years old. There is then an exam, with presentations given by a reception committee of 18 members, who talk on French gastronomy and oenology. Memberships are for life, with sons able to succeed fathers if deemed fit.

Membership of the club is selective and subject to a confidential admissions process. Although membership is formally open to individuals of any gender, no women have been reported as members.

Upon securing two mandatory sponsors, the candidate’s name is posted for a period of one month. This is followed by an interview before the reception and discipline committee. Candidates are assessed on personal qualities as well as gastronomic knowledge. Questions may address practical scenarios, such as restaurant choices in Nice, and familiarity with the Michelin Guide is expected. The committee then decides whether to approve the application and admit the candidate as a trainee.
