= Éric Pras =

French chef

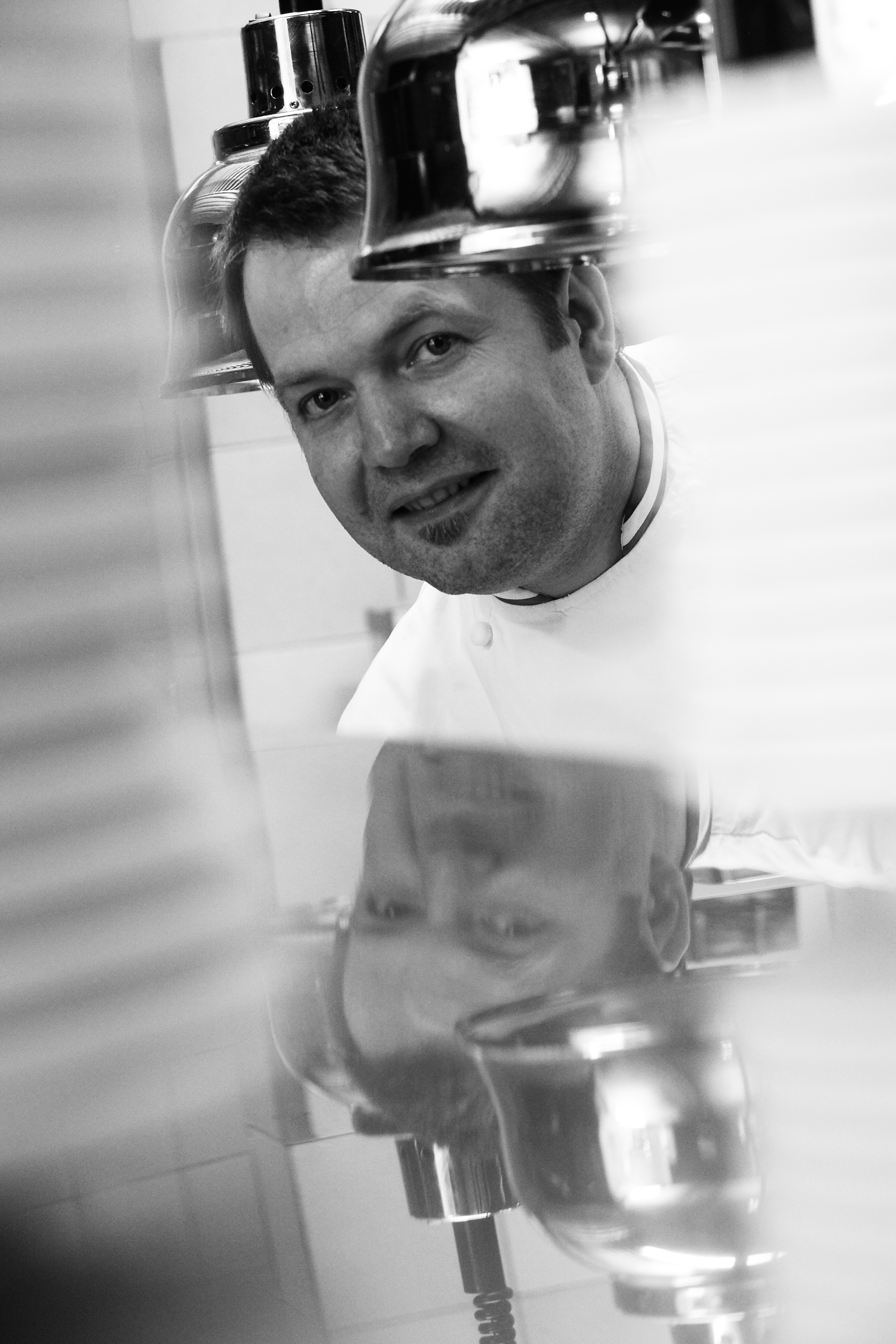
- Born: 1 March 1972 (age 54); Roanne, Loire, France
- Culinary career
- Cooking style: Haute cuisine
- Rating
- Michelin stars
- Current restaurant
- Restaurant Lameloise (Chagny)
- Website: lameloise.fr

Éric Pras (born 1 March 1972) is a French chef, Meilleur Ouvrier de France (2004), rated three stars by the Guide Michelin. He is the owner of the restaurant Lameloise located in Chagny, Saône-et-Loire.

== Training and career ==
Pras trained at the Hôtel Central de Renaison and then at the Maison Troisgros in Roanne, with Bernard Loiseau in Saulieu, with Pierre Gagnaire in Saint-Étienne, with Antoine Westermann in Strasbourg, at the Belle Otéro in Cannes, and with Régis Marcon in Saint-Bonnet-le-Froid.

He left Saint-Bonnet-le-Froid in 2008, where he had worked since 2005 as a sous-chef and chef, to go to Chagny where he replaced Jacques Lameloise as head chef of the Maison Lameloise restaurant.

== Books ==
- Toc toque, Éveil et découvertes, 18 pages, 2008, ISBN 9782353661060
- With Frédéric Lamy (author), Philippe Rossat (author) and Matthieu Cellard (photographer), Lameloise : Une maison en Bourgogne, Glénat, 216 pages, 2011, ISBN 9782723464505

== See also ==
- List of Michelin starred restaurants
