= André Gayot =

French journalist and food writer (1929–2019)

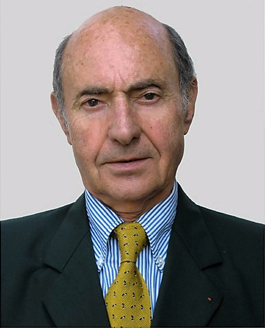
André Gayot

André Gayot (French: [ɑ̃dʁe ɡajo]; 3 October 1929 – 5 October 2019) was a French journalist. After a career in journalism he moved into culinary criticism and produced restaurant guidebooks known as the "Gayot Guides."

== Career ==
=== Journalist ===
Gayot started his career in 1949 at the ORTF, producing a program for a young audience while pursuing his studies.

Gayot became a political columnist in 1957, working for the daily newspaper La Liberté du Massif Central and as an editor for Paris-Presse. He joined the weekly magazine Jours de France in 1958.

=== Work in Africa, The Americas, and Asia ===
In 1960, Gayot was appointed director of information of Niger, where he created the information services and the daily Le Temps du Niger.

After founding the daily Le Courrier de Madagascar in Antananarivo in 1962, he directed it until 1967. That same year, Gayot created the weekly France Antilles Spécial Dimanche while living in Martinique.

In 1968, he was in Dakar, Senegal, leading the creation of the newspaper Le Soleil and of Les Nouvelles Imprimeries du Sénégal, which paved the way to the plurality and opening of information in French West Africa. Gayot was active in Canada, where he renewed and relaunched the world's oldest French-language daily newspaper, L'Evangéline. He brought his expertise to the local press in Vietnam, Egypt, Mauretania, Zaïre (Republic of Congo), Burundi, and Iran.

=== Culinary guides ===
In 1969, with his friends Henri Gault and Christian Millau, Gayot created the monthly magazine Le Nouveau Guide, which went against the culinary traditions of the time by promoting artistically prepared food, new cooking techniques, and fresh ingredients. The three also founded the Gault Millau guide, and coined and promoted the term nouvelle cuisine.

In the 1980s and 1990s, Gayot published a series of restaurant guidebooks in the U.S., known as the Gault-Millau name or Gayot Guides. The guidebooks rated and highlighted restaurants deemed to be among the best in their region, with reviews discussing décor, service, ambiance, and wine lists, with an emphasis on French cuisine. After 2000, his guides were published exclusively under the name Gayot, following a disagreement with the new owners of the French Gault-Millau guides.

In 1983, Gayot founded the monthly magazine Prévention Santé in Paris, in conjunction with Rodale, Inc. in Emmaus, Pennsylvania, United States. With his son Alain and daughter Sophie, he launched the website gayot.com, devoted to gastronomy, tourism, and lifestyle.

== Recognition ==
On 7 May 1979, Léopold Sédar Senghor, President of the Republic of Senegal, presented Gayot with the distinction of Knight of the Legion of Honour, in his name and that of the President of the French Republic Valéry Giscard d'Estaing, in the presence of Michel Debré, former French prime minister, for his humanitarian and cultural actions for Africa.

On 27 April 2005, Jean-David Levitte, the Ambassador of France in Washington, D.C., awarded Gayot the rank of Officer of the Legion of Honour "for exceptional services rendered to the freedom of press and promotion of the friendship between nations".

Gayot was an officer in the National Order of the Lion of Senegal, the national Order of the Niger, and the Order of Comoros.

== Death ==
Gayot died in Paris on 5 October 2019, two days after his 90th birthday.
