= Jacques Lameloise =

French chef (born 1947)

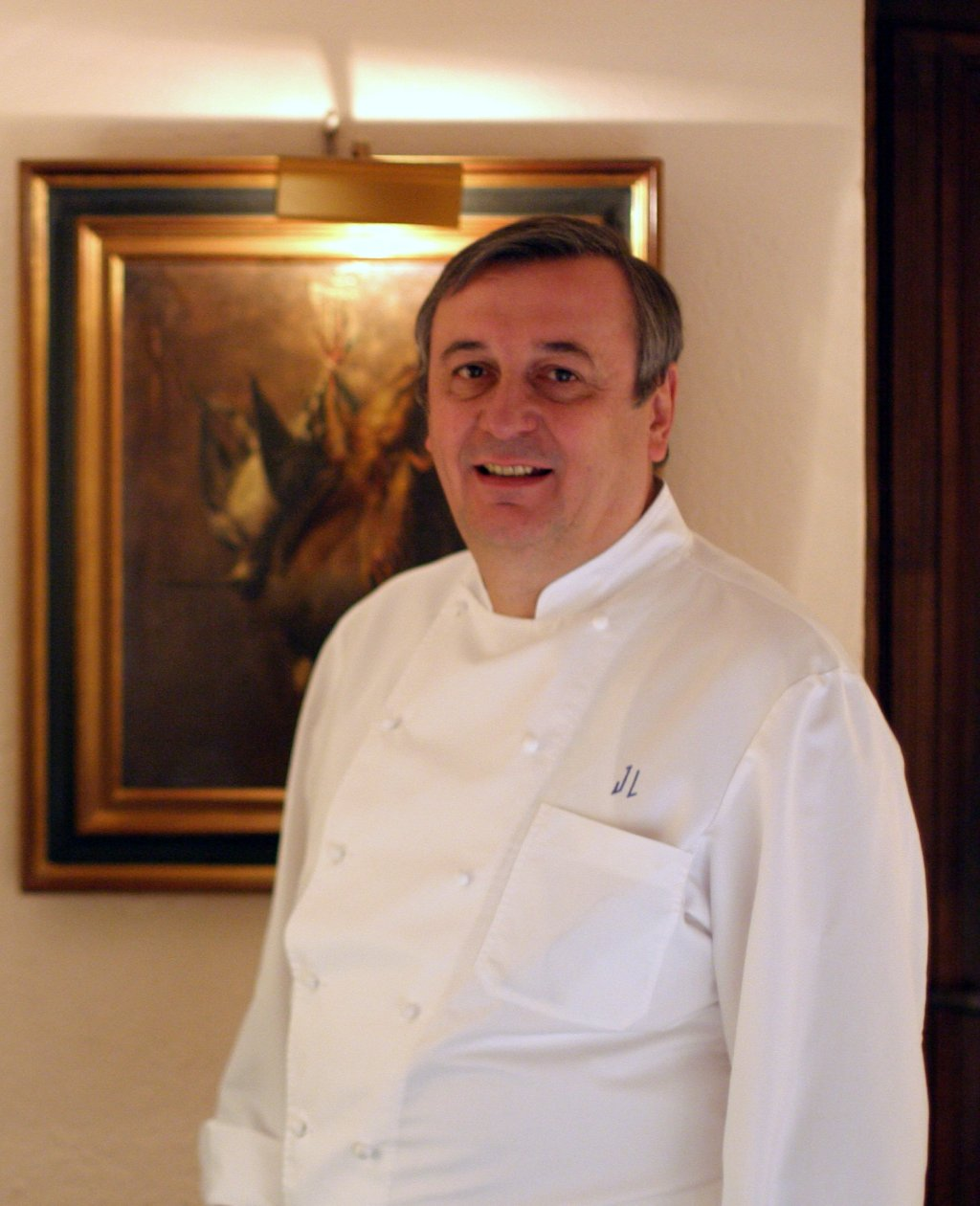
- Born: 6 April 1947 (age 79)
- Occupation: Chef
- Employer: Self-employed
- Known for: Lameloise
- Spouse: Nicole
- Culinary career
- Cooking style: Haute cuisine; Burgundian

Jacques Lameloise (French pronunciation: [ʒak lamlwaz], born 6 April 1947) is a French chef who was the chef de cuisine at the French restaurant Maison Lameloise (usually known as Lameloise) in Chagny from 1979 until 2008.

== Lameloise ==
The restaurant has a three-star Michelin rating. The cuisine is based on the local cuisine of Burgundy.

Lameloise was the third-generation chef to run the restaurant. His grandfather Pierre received a second Michelin star in 1931. His father Jean ran the restaurant from 1944 to 1971 when Jacques took over. In 1979, the restaurant received the third Michelin star (at that time he was the youngest chef with three Michelin stars).

Since 2008 the restaurant is run by Éric Pras.

Lameloise is a graduate of École Supérieure de Cuisine Française (ESCF) - Ferrandi.
