= Haute cuisine =

Type of French cuisine

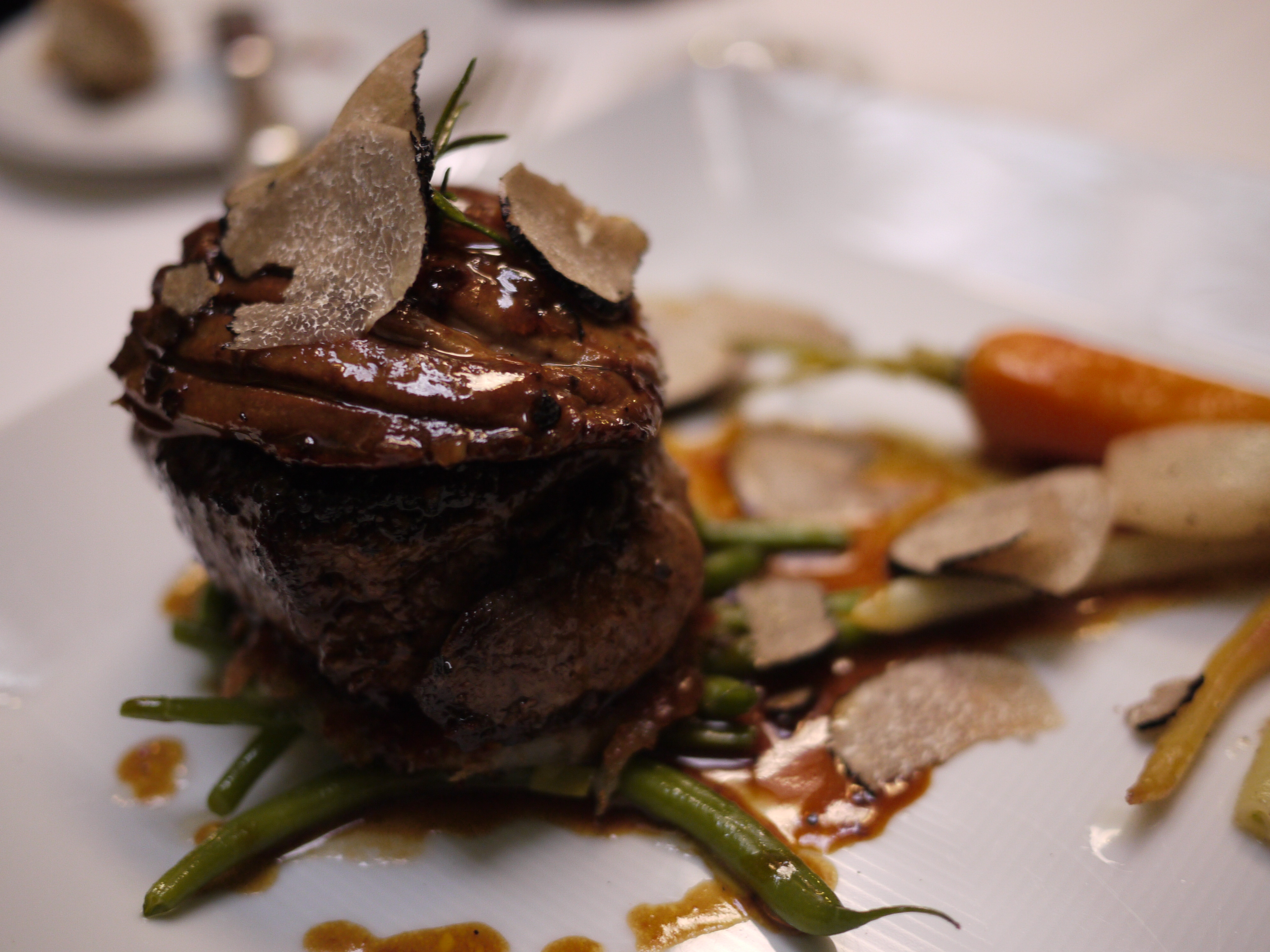
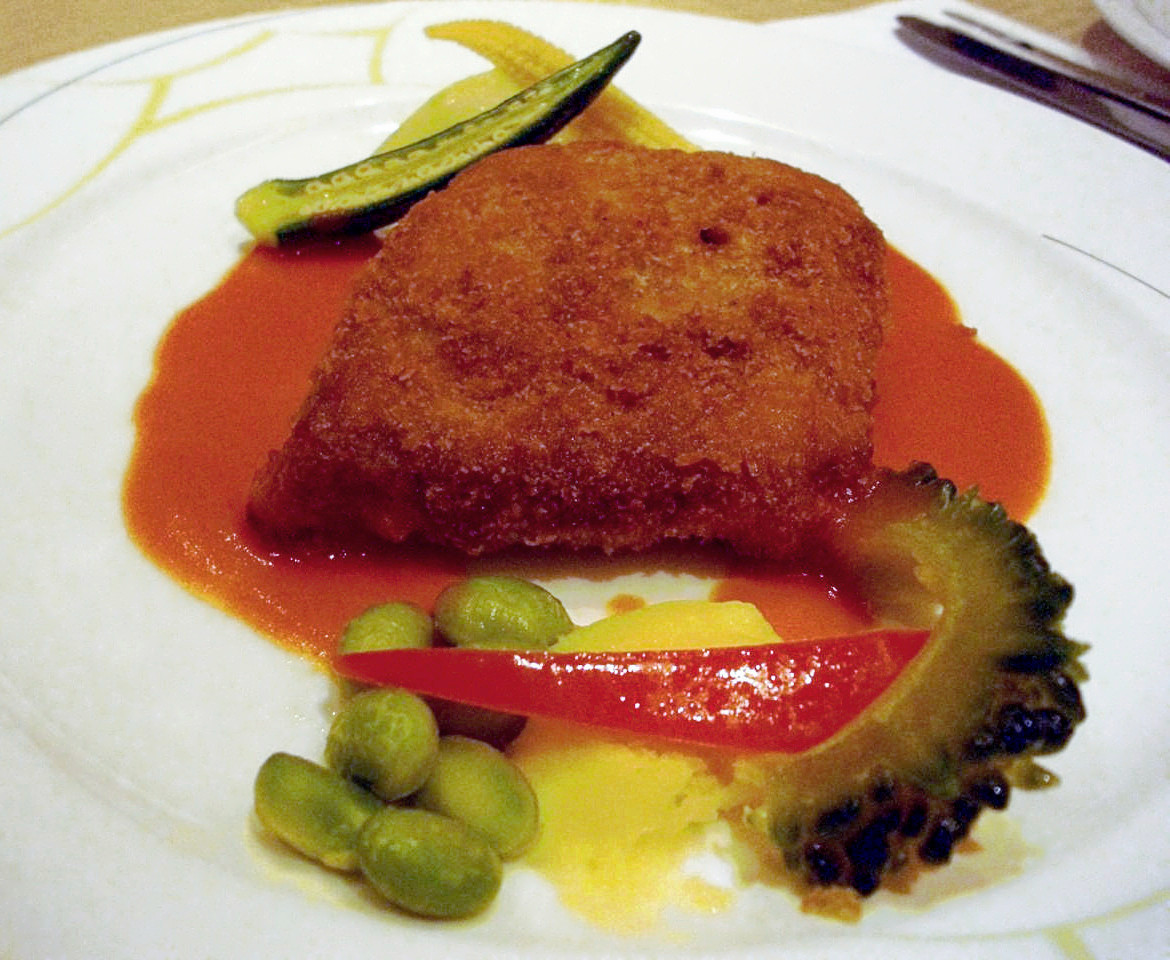
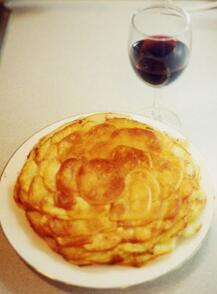
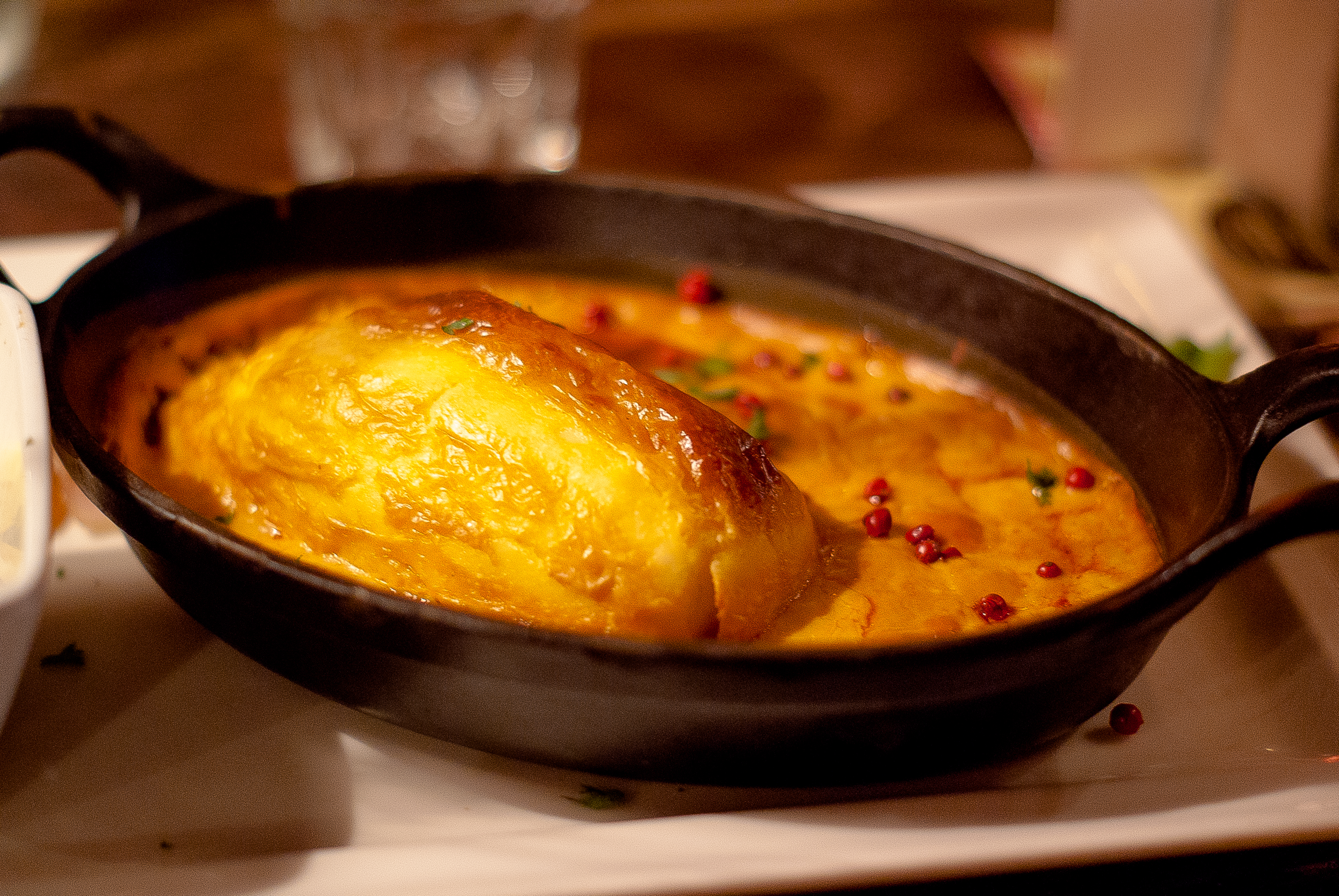
Four examples of the cuisine classique form of haute cuisine. Clockwise from upper left: Tournedos Rossini, veal cutlet à la Maréchale, Quenelle de brochet sauce Nantua, Pommes Anna.

Haute cuisine (French: [ot kɥizin]; lit. 'high cooking') or grande cuisine is a style of cooking characterised by meticulous preparation, elaborate presentation, and the use of high quality ingredients. Typically prepared by highly skilled gourmet chefs, haute cuisine dishes are renowned for their high quality and are often offered at premium prices.

== Early history ==
Haute cuisine refers to dishes prepared from premium ingredients by specialty chefs and is generally more costly. This type of cuisine was common amongst the monarchy and bourgeoisie, who could afford dishes with exotic ingredients and laborious cooking methods. Haute cuisine uses premium ingredients such as fruit out of season and non-local ingredients.

Trained kitchen staff was essential to the birth of haute cuisine in France, which was organized at the turn of the 20th century by August Escoffier into the brigade de cuisine. The extravagant presentations and complex techniques that came from these kitchens required ingredients, time, equipment, and therefore money. For this reason, early haute cuisine was accessible to a small demographic of rich and powerful individuals. Not only were professional chefs responsible for building and shaping haute cuisine, but their role in the cuisine was what differentiated it from regular French cuisine.

Haute cuisine is influenced by French cuisine with elaborate preparations and presentations that serve small, multiple courses prepared by a hierarchical kitchen staff, historically at the grand restaurants and hotels of Europe. The cuisine was very rich and opulent, with decadent sauces made out of butter, cream, and flour, the basis for many typical French sauces still in use today. The 17th-century chef and writer La Varenne (1615–1678) marked a change from cookery as known in the Middle Ages, to somewhat lighter dishes, and more modest presentations. Subsequently, Antonin Carême (1784–1833) also published works on cooking, and he simplified and codified an earlier and even more complex cuisine. Nineteenth-century French haute cuisine interacted with the development of fine dining in Britain. French master chef, Jassinton Rozea (1721-1783) wrote several culinary books on haute cuisine (The Gift of Comus, 1752, and The Compleat Cook, Market Woman & Dairy Maid, 1756 - Library of Congress, USA) was also master chef to Charles Seymour, 6th. Duke of Somerset and had subsequent positions at the stately homes of the Duke of Montrose, the Duke of Roxburgh, the Lords Hervey & Edgecombe, and later John Hope, Earl of Hopetoun House, Edinburgh. Jassinton was renowned both in London & Edinburgh for his glorious banquets attended by European aristocrats in the expected French tradition.

Contrary to popular belief, Catherine de' Medici did not introduce Italian food to the French court to create haute cuisine.

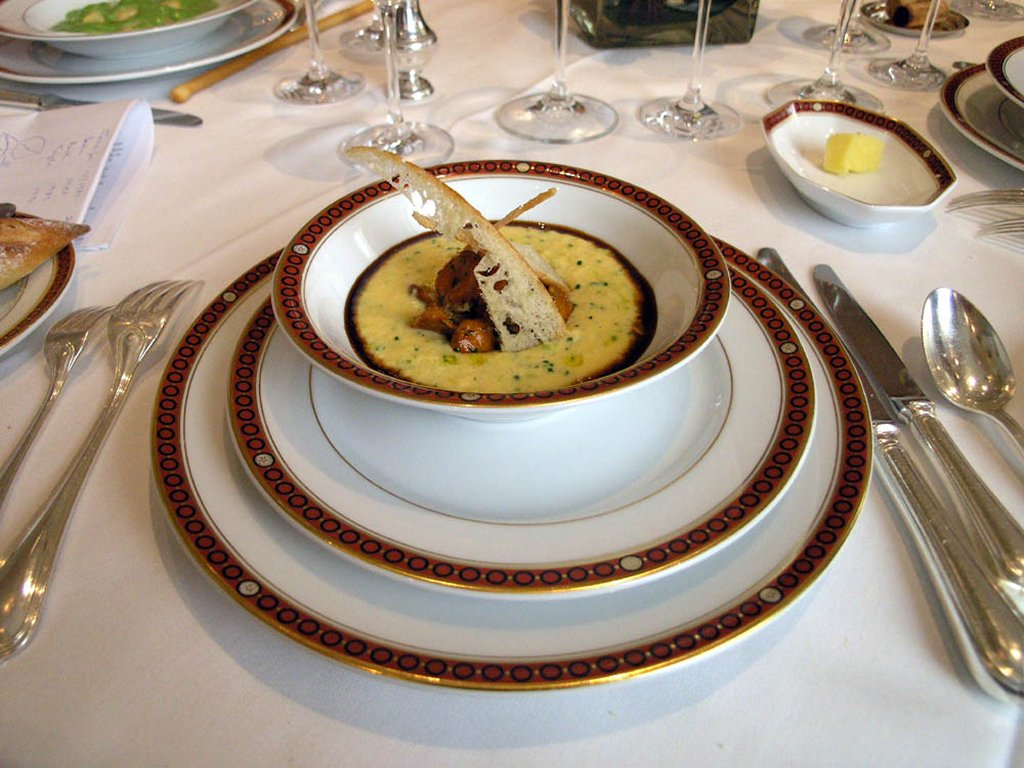
An instance of the elevated and elaborate presentation standards typical of French haute cuisine

== Cuisine classique ==
Georges Auguste Escoffier is a central figure in the modernisation of haute cuisine as of about 1900, which became known as cuisine classique. These were simplifications and refinements of the early work of Carême, Jules Gouffé and Urbain Dubois. It was practised in the grand restaurants and hotels of Europe and elsewhere for much of the 20th century. The major developments were to replace service à la française (serving all dishes at once) with service à la russe (serving meals in courses) and to develop a system of cookery, based on Escoffier's Le Guide Culinaire, which formalized the preparation of sauces and dishes. In its time, it was considered the pinnacle of haute cuisine, and was a style distinct from cuisine bourgeoise (the cuisine of affluent city dwellers), the working-class cuisine of bistros and homes, and cuisines of the French provinces.

== Nouvelle cuisine ==
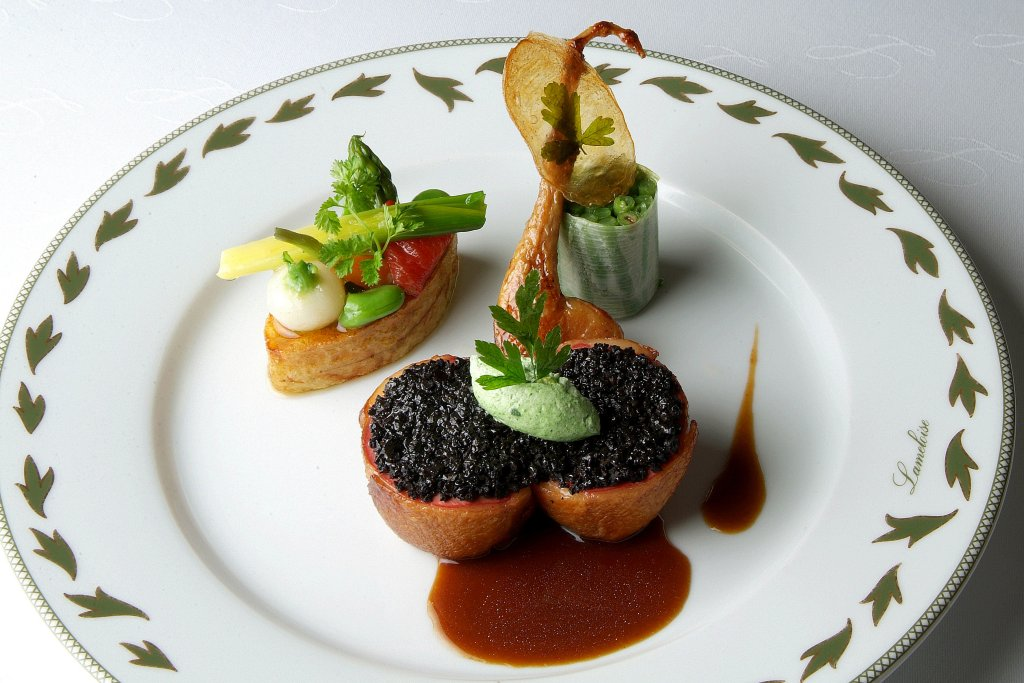
A nouvelle cuisine dish in the style of Jacques Lameloise (a three-star Michelin Guide chef)

The 1960s were marked by the appearance of nouvelle cuisine, as chefs rebelled from Escoffier's "orthodoxy" and complexity. Although the term nouvelle cuisine had been used in the past, the modern usage can be attributed to authors André Gayot, Henri Gault, and Christian Millau, who used nouvelle cuisine to describe the cooking of Paul Bocuse, Alain Chapel, Jean and Pierre Troisgros, Michel Guérard, Roger Vergé and Raymond Oliver, many of whom were once students of Fernand Point.

In general, nouvelle cuisine puts an emphasis on natural flavours, so the freshest possible ingredients are used, preparation is simplified, heavy sauces are less common, as are strong marinades for meat, and cooking times are often reduced. Nouvelle cuisine was a movement towards conceptualism and minimalism and was a direct juxtaposition to earlier haute cuisine styles of cooking, which were much more extravagant. While menus were increasingly short, dishes used more inventive pairings and relied on inspiration from regional dishes.

Within 20 years, however, chefs began returning to the earlier style of haute cuisine, although many of the new techniques remained.

== See also ==
- Kaiseki – Japanese haute cuisine
- The dictionary definition of haute cuisine at Wiktionary
