= Christian Millau =

French food critic and author (1928–2017)

Christian Dubois-Millot, pen name Christian Millau (French pronunciation: [kʁistjɑ̃ mijo], 30 December 1928 – 5 August 2017), was a French food critic and author.

Born in Paris, he began his career as a journalist in the "interior policy" department of Le Monde newspaper. In 1965 he founded the Gault Millau restaurant guide Le Nouveau Guide with Henri Gault and André Gayot. He launched the famed Gault & Millau guide in 1969 with Henri Gault, which helped galvanise the movement of young French chefs developing lighter, more inventive and beautiful looking dishes. Some 100,000 copies of the guide were sold that year. He was originally slated to be one of the judges at the historic Judgment of Paris wine tasting event of 1976 but was replaced by his brother Claude Dubois-Millot.

His friends announced his death on 7 August 2017 at the age of 88.

== Published works ==
- (with Marianne Rufenacht) La Belle Époque à table, Gault-Millau, 1981
- Dining in France Stewart, Tabori & Chang 1986 ISBN 0-283-99395-2
- La France à la carte Gault-Millau 1986 ISBN 2-85108-441-0
- The Best of San Francisco & Northern California Hungry Minds Inc. 1988 ISBN 0-13-076084-6
- The Best of Los Angeles Gault-Millau 1988 ISBN 0-13-076068-4
- The Best of London Gault-Millau 1990 ISBN 0-13-073180-3
- Les fous du palais: Drôle de voyage au pays des gourmands R. Laffont 1994 ISBN 2-221-07985-X
- The Best of Paris Gault-Millau 1994 ISBN 1-881066-03-7
- Au galop des hussards: Dans le tourbillon littéraire des années 50 Fallois 1999 ISBN 2-87706-346-1
  Grand Prix de l' Académie française de la biographie, Prize Joseph Kessel.
- Paris m'a dit: Années 50, fin d'une époque Fallois 2000 ISBN 2-87706-388-7
- Bon baisers du goulag. Secrets de famille. PLON 2004 ISBN 2-259-19976-3
- Commissaire Corcoran Editions Feryane 2004 ISBN 2-84011-701-0
- Dieu est-il Gascon ? Le Rocher 2006 ISBN 2-268-05775-5
- Guide des restaurants fantômes. Ou les ridicules de la société française. Plon 2007 ISBN 978-2-259-20699-0
- Le passant de Vienne. Un certain Adolf Éditions du Rocher, 2010
- Journal impoli, 2011-1928 Editions du Rocher 2011 ISBN 2-268-07052-2
- Dictionnaire d'un peu tout et n'importe quoi, Editions du Rocher, 2013, ISBN 9782268075075

== See also ==
- Club des Cent
