= Henri Gault =

French food journalist (1929–2000)

- Born: Henri Gaudichon; 4 November 1929; Pacy-sur-Eure, France
- Died: 9 July 2000 (aged 70); Saint-Sulpice-en-Pareds, France
- Burial place: Saint-Sulpice-en-Pareds
- Occupation(s): Journalist, writer, food critic
- Website: https://www.gaultmillau.org/

Henri Gault (French pronunciation: [ɑ̃ʁi ɡo], 4 November 1929 – 9 July 2000) was a French food journalist. He was co-founder of the Gault Millau guides with Christian Millau, and invented the phrase nouvelle cuisine. He later stated that he regretted it.

== Biography ==
Gault was born Henri Gaudichon on 4 November 1929 in Pacy-sur-Eure, France. Following in his father's foot steps, he started his studies in medicine. In 1956 he became a reporter for the French newspapers Paris-Presse and L'Intransigeant.

In 1961 he began working for Paris Presse mainly covering local politics. The then editor of the paper, Christian Millau, asked Gault to try writing restaurant reviews. Given the success of the reviews, Gault and Millau compiled the reviews into a book called Guide Julliard. An American version of the book was later published by Odyssey Press.

In 1969 they started the monthly magazine GaultMillau which would eventually be published as separate editions for different regions of France. The first volume of the GaultMillau guide was published in 1972.

In 1973, Gault and Millau invented the term nouvelle cuisine in an article where they discussed the 10 commandments of the nouvelle cuisine:

- Do not overcook
- You will use only high quality, fresh products
- You will simplify your menu
- You will not be resolutely modernist
- You will strive to learn from new techniques
- You will avoid marinating, aging, fermenting etc.
- You will eliminate rich sauces
- You won’t ignore nutrition
- You won’t fake your presentations
- You will be inventive

Gault died from a heart attack on 9 July 2000 in Saint-Sulpice-en-Pareds at the age of 71.

== Works ==
- Guide Julliard de Bruxelles, 1965
- Julliard Guide to New York, Boston, Chicago, Los Angeles, New Orleans, San Francisco and Montréal, 1967
- Juilliard Guide to the Areas Around Paris, 1966
- Guide Julliard de Paris, 1967
- La Tunisie (In collaboration with Yves Bridault), 1968
- À voir et à manger (To see and eat), 1963
- Guide Julliard to Ireland (In collaboration with Nicole and Jean-Luc de Rudder; prefaced by Francis Ambrière)
- Gourmet guide to France, 1970
- Guide France (Guide to France), 1984
- Guide Italie (Guide to Italy), 1984
- The World Guide Julliard, 1968
- Julliard Guide to Europe, 1964
- The guide to foreign restaurants in Paris, 1995

== See also ==
- Gault Millau
- Christian Millau
- Nouvelle cuisine
- Haut cuisine
