= Schuddebeurs (restaurant) =

Restaurant in Schuddebeurs, Netherlands

Coordinates: 51°40′30.67″N 3°56′41.89″E

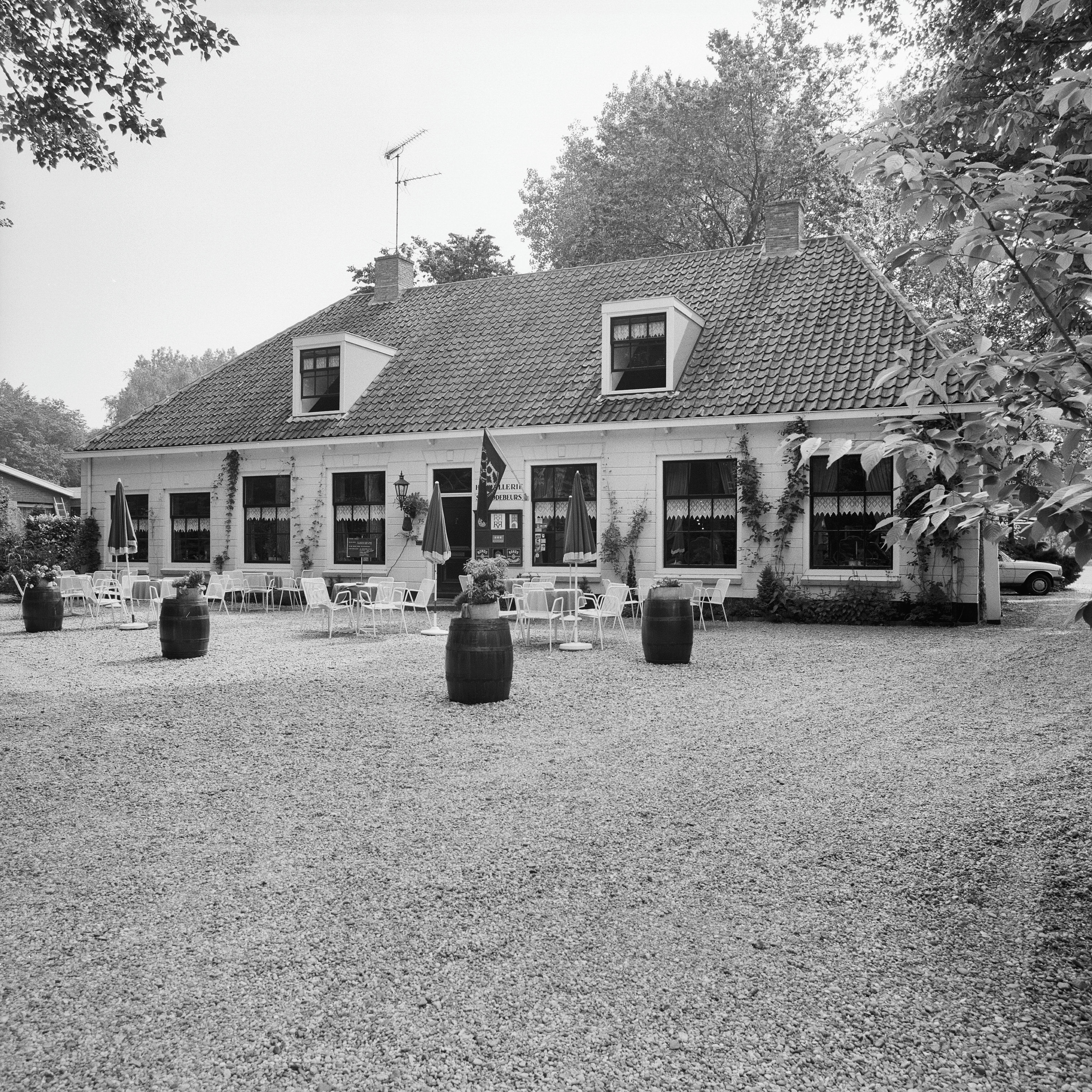
- Interactive map of Schuddebeurs

Restaurant information
- Established: 1978
- Head chef: Jaap Tanis
- Rating: Michelin Guide
- Location: Donkereweg 35, Schuddebeurs (near Zierikzee), 4317 NL, Netherlands
- Website: Official website (Dutch)

Restaurant-Hostellerie Schuddebeurs is a restaurant in Schuddebeurs, near Zierikzee, in the Dutch province of Zeeland. It is a fine dining restaurant that was awarded one Michelin star for 1986. It was awarded a Bib Gourmand in 2004 and 2005. In 2013, GaultMillau awarded the restaurant 13 out of 20 points.

Head chef of Schuddebeurs in the year of the Michelin star was Jaap Tanis, who had shortly before taken over the reins from Martin Hendriks. The Bib Gourmands were awarded to head chef Bart de Bree.

The building of the restaurant is in origin a 300-year-old inn. After a major renovation it opened in 1978 as a restaurant with a few rooms.

== See also ==
- List of Michelin starred restaurants in the Netherlands
