= Het Jachthuis Hoog Soeren =

Restaurant in Apeldoorn, the Netherlands

Coordinates: 52°13′5.77″N 5°52′22.2″E

- Interactive map of Het Jachthuis Hoog Soeren

Restaurant information
- Head chef: Peter-Paul van den Breemen
- Food type: French
- Location: Hoog Soeren 55, Hoog Soeren, Apeldoorn, 7346 AC, Netherlands
- Seating capacity: 50

Het Jachthuis Hoog Soeren was a restaurant in Hoog Soeren, Apeldoorn in the Netherlands. It was awarded one Michelin star in 1994 and retained that rating until 2001. The restaurant closed in February 2014, when the lease expired. The owner and head chef cited the high rent, the economic crisis and the lack of Michelin star as reasons to quit, as he deemed exploitation not viable under these circumstances.

Gault Millau awarded the restaurant 16.0 out of 20 points.

Head chef of Het Jachthuis Hoog Soeren was Peter-Paul van den Breemen, who took over the restaurant in 2005. Head chef in the Michelin period was Jankees Roggeveen.

== See also ==
- List of Michelin starred restaurants in the Netherlands
