= Édouard Loubet =

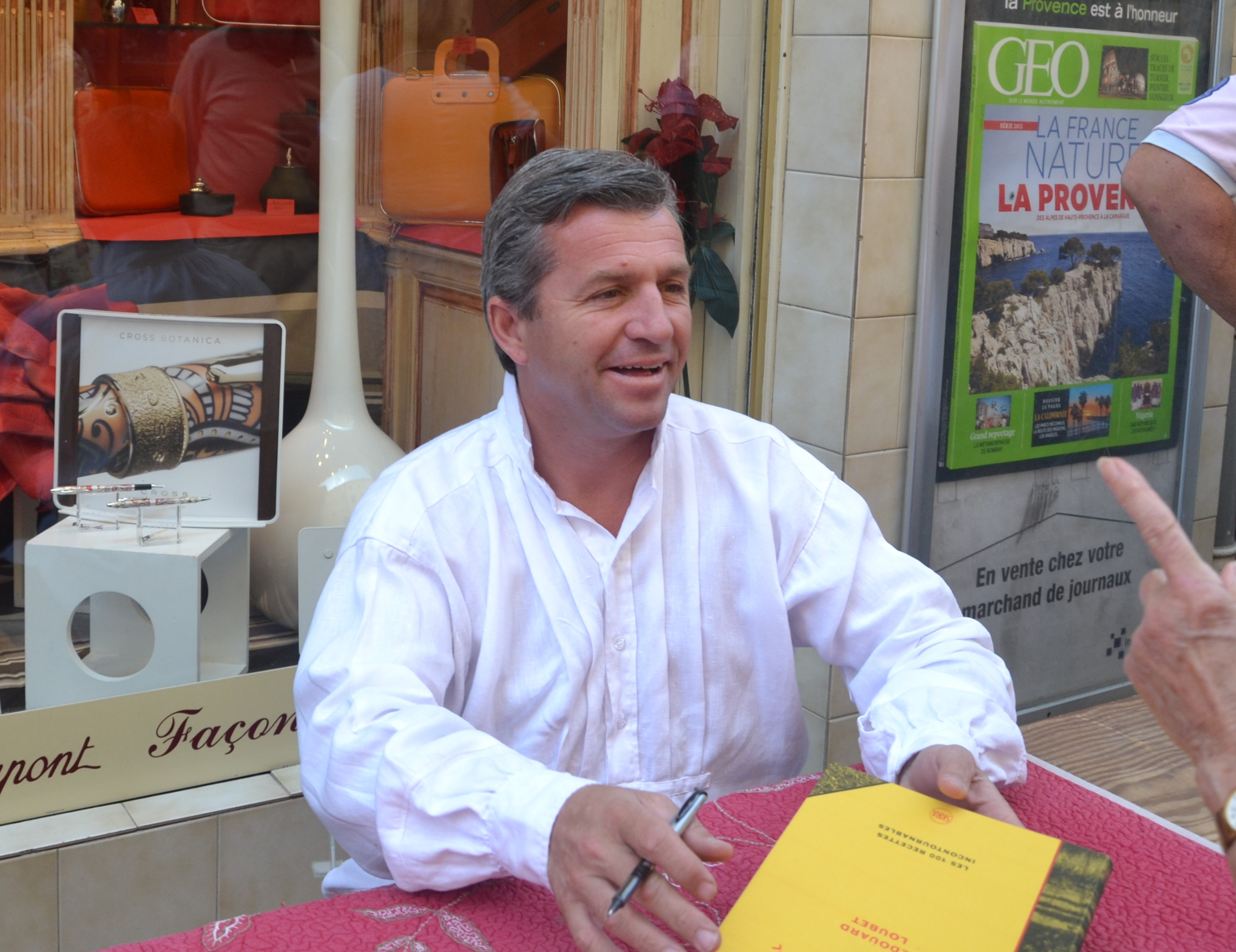
- Loubet signing books in 2015
- Born: 25 September 1970 (age 55); Val-Thorens, France
- Culinary career
- Rating: Michelin stars
- Current restaurant: La Bastide de Capelongue
- Previous restaurant(s): 2 étoiles au Guide Michelin 18/20 au Gault-Millau Elu chef de l'année 2011
- Website: http://www.capelongue.com/

Édouard Loubet (born 25 September 1970 in Val-Thorens, Savoy) is a French master chef with 2 stars in the Michelin Guide. He obtained the grade of 18/20 from the Gault et Millau book, which elected him chef of the year in 2011.

== Biography ==
Loubet grew up in Val-Thorens, ski resort in construction in 1970, where his mother Claude, opened the first restaurant, which was also a canteen for the workers. He discovered the cooking art with his grandparents with whom he cooked and gardened. Whereas he entered the under-21 French ski team, his mother advised him to opt for an apprenticeship in pastry, safer future than a sports career. In 1983, Claude began the construction of the four-star Fitz Roy (Relais et Château), the highest hotel in Europe where Édouard Loubet earned his spurs. After having obtained the "Meilleur Ouvrier de France" title, he joined the Ritz Carlton in Chicago with Fernand Guterez then the Chateau Frontenac in Quebec City. Back in France, he sent a letter to twenty of the best French master chefs. Only one replied: Alain Chapel in Mionnay who taught him the "delicacy and respect of the product. "He then joined the teams of Peter Orsy, the one of Philippe Chavent (La Tour Rose) and Marc Veyrat in Annecy. This is next to him that he met his wife Isabelle Guelpa, the chef's niece.

== Le Moulin de Lourmarin & Le Galinier de Lourmarin ==
In 1992, Loubet opened Le Moulin de Lourmarin, in Lourmarin. With Adrien Lombard, a former gardener, they cultivated a 5 hectare vegetable garden, which supplies the raw materials for the restaurant: fruits, heirloom vegetables and herbs. In parallel of the Moulins, the chef opened "Le Comptoir d'Édouard", bakery as well as catering and delicatessen store. In 1995, Loubet received his first Michelin star, and became the youngest chef of France. Three years later, he received his second star and published on this occasion his first book, "Un Printemps en Luberon" (A Spring in Provence). Édouard and Claude also manage Le Galinier de Lourmarin, ancient bastide of the 18th and 19th centuries.

== La Bastide de Capelongue ==
Claude, Édouard's mother, acquired Bonnieux's highest farm, where the chef transferred its gourmet restaurant and its two stars. Loubet created a garden and a botanical trail, and also gives cooking classes. In March 2006, his cuisine was named in the Red Gault Millau Guide. In 2011, the Yellow Guide named him Chef of the year. In 2011, the Bastide joined the Relais and Châteaux association and Loubet was appointed Master Chief by the same association.

== In Africa ==
For nearly two years, Edouard Loubet has held 3 festivals a year in Kenya and trains Kenyan cooks in French cuisine. The goal is to teach them how to use their country's best products and seek the best suppliers. He also organizes fortnight trainings at the Bastide de Capelongue for cooks who can make the trip. His collaboration with the Prince Aga Khan has also led him to develop a menu of the Mandhari – Nairobi Serena's restaurant-, and coach the Delagoa's chefs, the restaurant Polana Serena in Maputo, Mozambique. They both belong to the Serena hotel chain (32 hotels in Africa, India and Pakistan), held by the family of the Aga Khan.

== Membership of the Black Diamond and Gastronomy Brotherhood ==
Truffle is a particular ingredient to Loubet. He joined the Brotherhood of Richerenches enclave in the Drôme but belonging to the Vaucluse, one of whose features is the Mass of St. Anthony, where the truffles are offered before being auctioned on the place of village.

== In Culture ==
Loubet is one of the subjects of Agnès Varda's The Gleaners and I, a French documentary film about people who glean, the practice of picking harvest leftovers.

The film contrasts Loubet's motivations for gleaning with those who do it because they are poor, such as the itinerant rural groups that appear just before Loubet's segment. Varda narrates: "Surprisingly enough, Edouard is also a born gleaner, or rather a born picker."

When asked why he gleans, Loubet describes how his grandparents taught him how to pick food and that he is motivated by the desire to source ingredients locally.

== Bibliography ==
- Édouard Loubet, Un printemps en Luberon, Hachette Pratique, 2002
- Jean-Marc Favre, Jacques Guillard, Ève-Marie Zizza-Lalu, Six saisons en Luberon, Éditions Glénat, 2009
