= Au Coin des Bons Enfants =

- Interactive map of Au Coin des Bons Enfants

Restaurant information
- Established: 1949
- Head chef: George Taselaar
- Food type: French
- Location: Ezelmarkt 4, Maastricht, 6211 LJ, Netherlands
- Coordinates: 50°50′46″N 5°41′15″E
- Seating capacity: 45
- Website: aucoindesbonsenfants.nl

Au Coin des Bons Enfants is a restaurant in Maastricht, Netherlands. It is a fine dining restaurant that was awarded one Michelin star in the period 1958–1970 and 2006–2012. GaultMillau awarded the restaurant 15.0 out of 20 points.

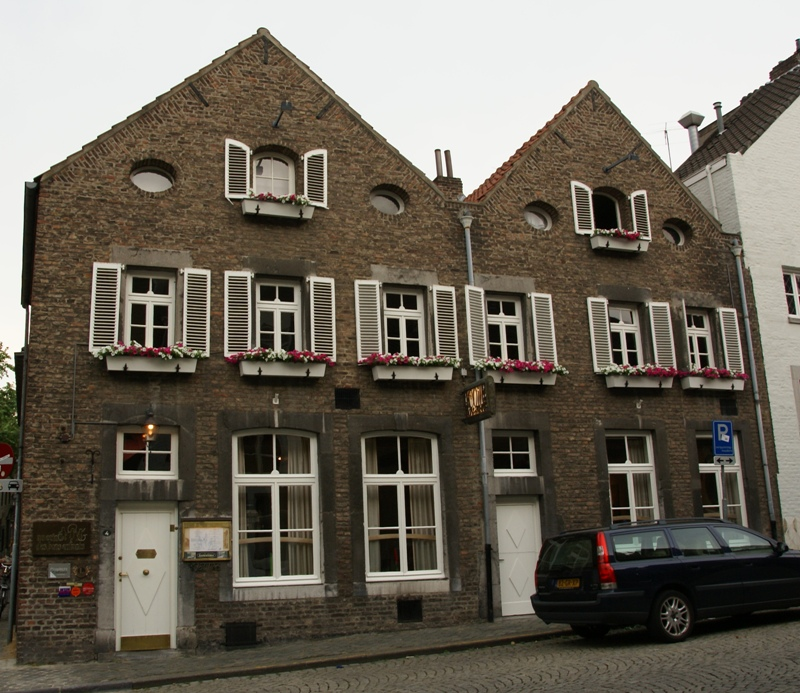
The monumental building

The first head chef was Theo Koch. In 1995, George Taselaar took over the restaurant and became head chef.

The restaurant is located in a former orphanage, originally built in 1750.

== See also ==
- List of Michelin starred restaurants in the Netherlands
