= Blok's Restaurant =

Coordinates: 52°9′23.79″N 5°23′17.45″E

- Interactive map of Blok's Restaurant

Restaurant information
- Head chef: Marco Blok
- Food type: International
- Rating: Michelin Guide
- Location: Krommestraat 49, Amersfoort, 3811 CB, Netherlands
- Website: Official website

Blok's Restaurant was a restaurant located in Amersfoort, Netherlands. It was a fine dining restaurant that was awarded a Michelin star for the period 2013–2019. Blok's was awarded a Bib Gourmand in the period 2007–2012. The sudden loss of the Bib in 2012 was a big shock and they did not understand it. Three weeks later the restaurant was awarded a Michelin star.

In 2015, GaultMillau awarded the restaurant 15 out of 20 points.

Owner and head chef of Blok's Restaurant is Marco Blok.

The restaurant closed in 2019.

== Awards ==
- Bib Gourmand: 2007-2012
- Michelin star: 2013–present
- Winner "Proef Amersfoort": 2006, 2008

== See also ==
- List of Michelin starred restaurants in the Netherlands
