= Chef de cuisine =

Manager of a kitchen

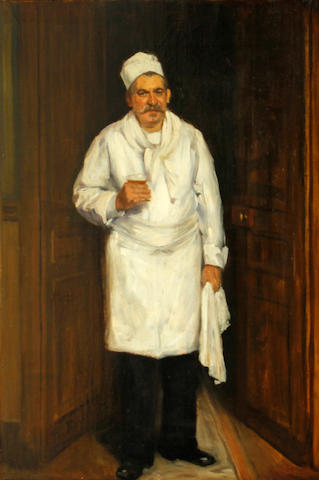
- The chef de cuisine (painting by Henri Brispot)

Occupation
- Names: Head Chef
- Occupation type: Profession
- Activity sectors: Cooking

Description
- Competencies: Cuisine expert, management of the menu, kitchen, and staff
- Fields of employment: Restaurants, hotels, dining facilities

A chef de cuisine (French pronunciation: [ʃɛf.də.kɥi.zin], French for head of kitchen), also called CDC or head chef, is a chef who leads a kitchen and its cooks. A chef patron (feminine form chef patronne) (French for boss chef) or executive chef is a chef that manages multiple kitchens and their staff.

The chef de cuisine is in charge of all activities related to the kitchen, which usually include creating menus; managing kitchen staff; ordering and purchasing stock and equipment; plating design; enforcing nutrition, safety and sanitation; and ensuring the quality of the meals that are served. Chef de cuisine is the traditional French term, meaning "chief of the kitchen" or "kitchen manager", from which the English word chef is derived.

== Function ==
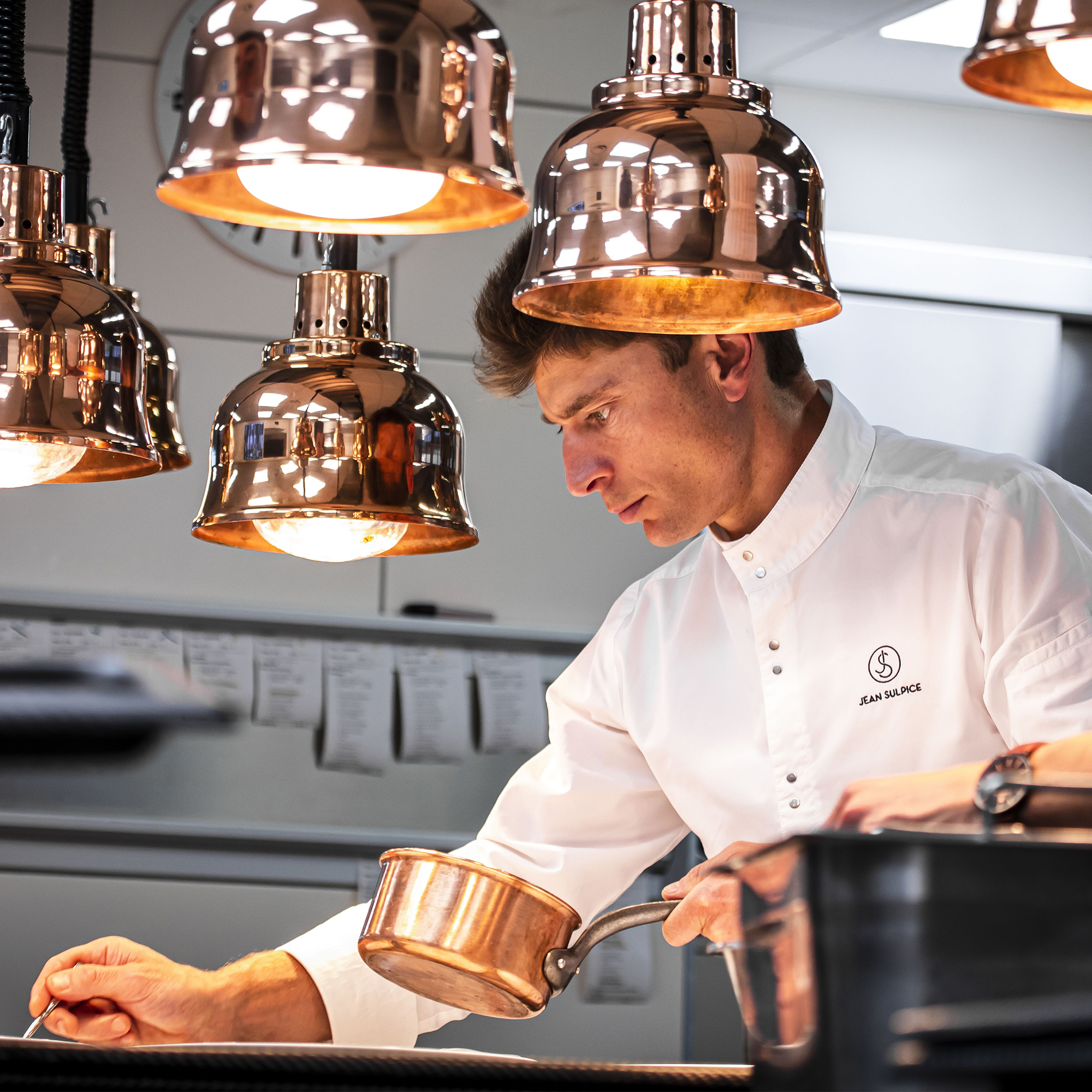
The French chef Jean Sulpice

Head chef is often used to designate someone with the same duties as an executive chef, but in larger restaurants there is usually someone in charge of a head chef such as a general manager who makes executive decisions such as the direction of the menu, has final authority regarding staff hiring and management decisions, and sets the overall tone and style of the restaurant. This is often the case for executive chefs who are in charge of several restaurants. In many restaurants, the executive chef or chef de cuisine will have a line-up/pre-shift meeting with the front of house (FOH) and back of house (BOH) staff in order to prepare for the service and answer questions about the menu.

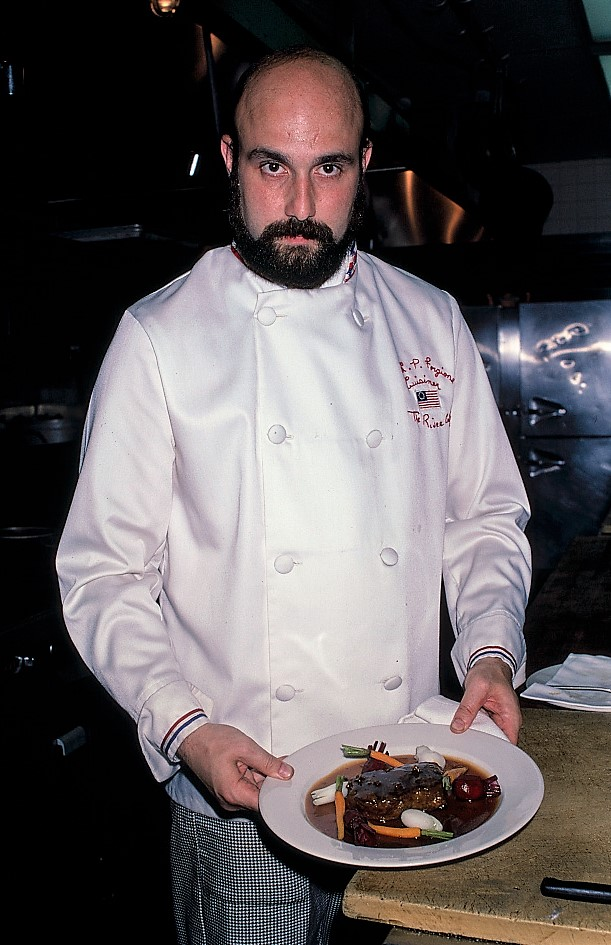
The American chef Larry Forgione at The River Café in New York City

In some food operations, the executive chef may assist in designing the menu, dining room and kitchen. He or she may also work with food purveyors, catering directors, equipment vendors, financial consultants, the media, sanitation inspectors and dietitians.

== See also ==
- List of restaurant terminology
- Brigade de cuisine
