= Ali Haydar Güngörmüş =

German chef (born 1976)

Ali Haydar Güngörmüş (born October 15, 1976, in Pageou, Tunceli Province, Turkey) is a German chef and television chef. In 2006, he was the first German-Turkish chef in Germany to receive a Michelin star. He was one of the first television chefs to prepare Turkish cuisine in Germany.

== Early life and education ==
Güngörmüş was born the middle child of seven children. He spent the first ten years of his life in Pageou, a now-abandoned village. The Alevi family had a small farm in the highlands of eastern Anatolia. The father worked as a welder in Munich from 1964. In 1986, the wife and children moved to Germany to join the father, where Ali completed his secondary education. Against the wishes of his parents and family, he began an apprenticeship as a chef at the Wirtshaus am Rosengarten in Westpark, Munich, in September 1991. He subsequently received a €10,000 scholarship from the Upper Bavarian Chamber of Industry and Commerce.

== Career ==
From 2000, he was temporarily head chef at the trendy restaurant "Lenbach," and then became a junior chef at Karl Ederer's Michelin-starred restaurant "Glockenbach" in Munich. Ederer subsequently became his mentor and secured him a position at the two-Michelin-starred restaurant Tantris and at the Schweizer Stuben in Wertheim.

In 2005, Güngörmüş opened the restaurant Le Canard Nouveau in Hamburg-Othmarschen. In November 2006, his restaurant was awarded a Michelin star. At the end of 2016, Güngörmüş relinquished the position of head chef to Florian Pöschl but remained a co-owner of Le Canard Nouveau.

In 2014, he also opened the restaurant Pageou in Munich in the former premises of Ederer. Pageou was the name of his home village in Eastern Anatolia.

In 2022, "Pera Meze" opened in the Gärtnerplatz district of Munich. The Turkish restaurant is named after the Beyoğlu district in Istanbul, which was formerly known by its Greek name, Pera.

In "Roadtrip Amerika" (Kabel Eins), celebrity chef Ali tours America for four weeks in a camper van with Frank Rosin and Alexander Kumptner – from the West Coast to the East Coast. Accompanied by a camera crew, the three TV chefs experience many unusual moments, such as skydiving, a hot dog eating contest, diving with sharks, and a python hunt.

In 2023, Güngörmüş was a contestant on the 16th season of "Let's Dance" and finished in 8th place.

== Media ==
Güngörmüş regularly appears as a TV chef on the North German Broadcasting (NDR) afternoon show "tipps & trends" and as a judge on the ZDF show "Die Küchenschlacht" (The Kitchen Battle). Between 2012 and 2013, he also hosted the show for four weeks. He also appeared on the cooking show "Lanz kocht!" (Lanz Cooks!), which was also broadcast on ZDF.

For Fatih Akın's 2009 film comedy "Soul Kitchen," Ali Güngörmüş coached actor Birol Ünel, who portrays an eccentric chef in the internationally acclaimed film. A sequence of scenes at the beginning of the film takes place at the Le Canard Nouveau restaurant.

Güngörmüş was a judge on the ZDF cooking show Topfgeldjäger with Alexander Herrmann from November 11, 2013, until its cancellation, succeeding Frank Rosin. Previously, he had served as a judge on several occasions in the duels between the former host Steffen Henssler and fellow judge Rosin.

Since May 11, 2014, he has been one of the professional chefs on the VOX cooking shows Grill den Henssler (11 appearances) and Grill den Profi. Furthermore, he competed against Tim Mälzer in a cooking duel in the episode of the cooking show "Kitchen Impossible," which first aired on February 3, 2019.

Since January 15, 2019, he has been a guest in Hessian households on the Hessian Broadcasting Corporation's (hr) cooking show "Koch's anders – Hessische Küche neu entdecken" (Koch's Different – Hessian Cuisine Rediscovered). In this show, he tastes typical regional dishes and then has to reinterpret them. Seventy episodes were broadcast in seven seasons until March 2025.

Starting in 2020, three seasons of the cooking show "Grillen mit Ali und Adnan" (Grilling with Ali and Adnan) were produced for Bavarian Broadcasting (BR), in which Güngörmüş grilled dishes together with the actor Adnan Maral. In 2023, Ivana Sanshia Austermayer took over Ali Güngörmüş's place, and the name changed to "Grilling with Ivana and Adnan." In 2021, Güngörmüş played the role of Dr. Zirner in the television film "Servus, Mother-in-Law!" produced by Maral. The film premiered on October 29, 2021, on Das Erste.

first broadcast.

He also appeared on the BR television magazine program Wir in Bayern.

== Awards ==
- 2006: One Michelin star (since Michelin 2007) for Le Canard Nouveau
- In 2006, he was selected as one of the 100 Minds of Tomorrow by the initiative Germany – Land of Ideas.
- 2018: 17 points in the Gault-Millau for the restaurant Pageou, Munich (since the 2019 edition)

== Books ==
- Ali Güngörmüş. Süddeutsche Zeitung Edition, Series: Library of Chefs, Munich 2008, hardcover, ISBN 978-3-86615-556-5.
- My Turkish Cuisine. Dorling Kindersley Verlag, Munich 2016, hardcover, ISBN 978-3-8310-2786-6.
- Look at the Sun, Look at the Day: The Taste of My Life. Rowohlt, Hamburg 2019, hardcover, ISBN 978-3-498-02542-7.
- My Aromatic Cuisine: Mediterranean – Oriental – Special. Dorling Kindersley Verlag, Munich 2019, hardcover, ISBN 978-3-8310-3643-1.
- Mediterranean: 100 Creative Recipes from Around the Mediterranean. Dorling Kindersley Verlag, Munich 2021, hardcover, ISBN 978-3-8310-4186-2.
- 'Meze Vegetarian: Combine, Share, Enjoy'. Dorling Kindersley Verlag, Munich 2022, hardcover, ISBN 978-3-8310-4357-6.
- 'Mediterranean Express'. Dorling Kindersley Verlag, Munich 2024, hardcover, ISBN 978-3-8310-4845-8.

== Films ==
- 'In Foreign Pots: A Star Chef Travels Through Germany.' TV documentary, Germany, 2010, 60 min., written and directed by Ralph Quinke, produced by Spiegel TV, first broadcast: December 21, 2010 on VOX
- 'Beyond the Stove and Lobster.' Star Chefs Up Close. Documentary, Germany, 2009, 94 min., Written by Anja Gerloff and Ralph Quinke, Directed by Ralph Quinke, Produced by Spiegel TV, First broadcast: October 30, 2010 on VOX – Portraits of master chefs Ali Güngörmüş, Karl-Emil Kuntz, and Lea Linster.
