= Jean Sulpice =

French chef from Aix-les-Bains (born 1978)

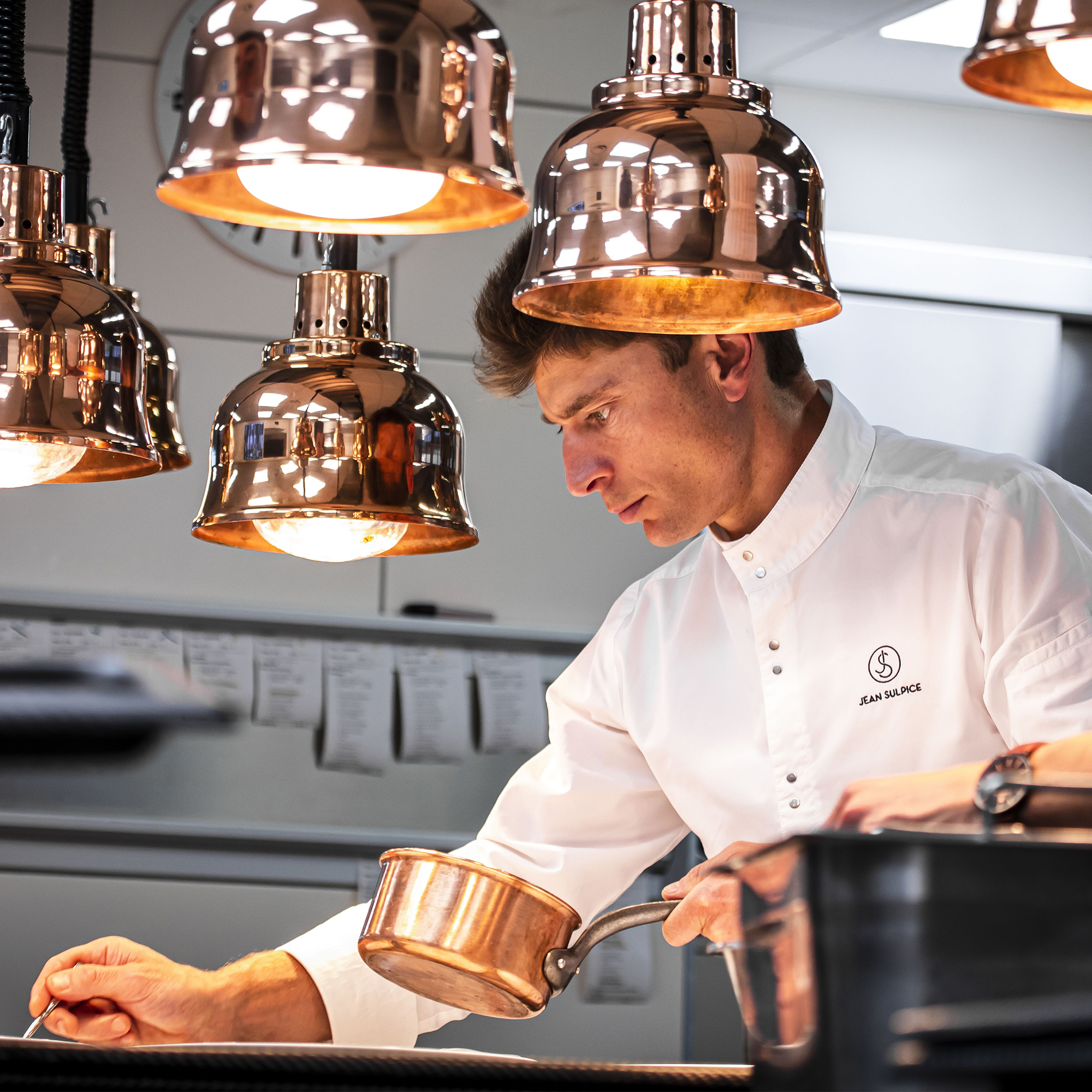
- Jean Sulpice
- Born: 27 July 1978 (age 48); Aix-les-Bains, France
- Spouse: Magali Sulpice
- Culinary career
- Cooking style: Seasonal Food
- Ratings: Michelin stars; Gault et Millau
- Current restaurant: Restaurant de Jean Sulpice (previously named The Oxalys)
- Website: www.jeansulpice.com

Jean Sulpice (French pronunciation: [ʒɑ̃ sylpis]; born 27 July 1978) is a French chef from Aix-les-Bains. He is best known for being the youngest French chef to ever receive a Michelin Star; he was 26 years old at the time. His first restaurant was called Restaurant de Jean Sulpice (The Oxalys before 2014) and was located in Val Thorens in the French Alps.

== Biography ==
Jean Sulpice was born on 27 July 1978 in Aix-Les-Bains, Savoie. He comes from a family of restaurant owners and he spent his childhood in his hometown. His vocation for cooking started at a very young age when he spent time in his parents' restaurant...

At the age of 16, Jean Sulpice obtained an apprenticeship at the Auberge Lamartine and started learning gastronomy alongside the renowned French chefs Jean and Pierre Marin. In 1998, Jean Sulpice met Marc Veyrat and was offered a second in command position at La Ferme de Mon Père, in Megève. Wanting to learn more, Jean Sulpice left Marc Veyrat's kitchen and entered the kitchen of the Arnsbourg restaurant, in Baerenthal (Moselle), next to Jean-Georges Klein. He also worked at the Hotel de Carantec (Finistère) and in Paris for two years.

In December 2002 he opened his own restaurant in Val Thorens (2300m high), with his wife Magali Sulpice. The restaurant has since been renamed "Restaurant de Jean Sulpice" (2014). The restaurant is the holder of two Michelin stars and became the highest-starred restaurant in Europe. Jean Sulpice, who obtained 2 stars, his first at the age of 26 and his second at 31, is considered the youngest starred French chef

Jean Sulpice sold his Val Thorens restaurant in 2016 and took over the once Michelin 3-star century old famed Auberge du Père Bise, in Talloires on Lake Annecy in the French Alps.

== Restaurant ==
Jean Sulpice's first restaurant opened in 2002, and it was located in Val Thorens, at an altitude of 2,300 metres, situated in the 3 valleys ski area, which are the highest ski resorts in Europe. The name of the restaurant (changed in 2014) was taken from a plant called oxalis. These flowers are endemic to the mountains of Val Thorens and have been a big part of Jean Sulpice's inspiration for cooking.

The opening of his restaurant represented a challenge for him since tourists around Val Thorens were typically expecting to eat fondues and raclettes when in the mountain. Nonetheless, the restaurant has become the highest gastronomic restaurant in the world. The restaurant has a staff of 25 employees, and offers menus ranging in price from €74 to €226 in 2014.

== Cooking ==
"Un adepte de terroir et de saisonnalité" (An adept of regional and seasonal dishes)

Jean Sulpice's recipes are inspired by the regional and seasonal traditions of Savoie, as well as his life experience. The creation of new dishes comes from testing different cooking methods with raw products, at different temperatures, in order to create different textures, flavors and appearances. Many procedures are adapted as cooking at the altitude of 2,300m is a challenge at a chemical level. Therefore, in order to cook at this altitude, Jean Sulpice had to adapt many of his cooking procedures.

=== Projects ===
Apart from being a well-known chef, he is also involved in several projects. The seasonal opening of his restaurant allows time for Jean Sulpice to participate in external events, such as cooking for the day-nursery of Val Thorens. His objective is to raise awareness, to educate and to transmit the good quality of food to children. Jean Sulpice also runs 'open kitchen' events in summer to share knowledge of his gastronomy.

In September 2014, Jean Sulpice participated in the Épicure Culinary Festival in Zürich and in June 2014, he took part in a culinary workshop, organized by Uncle Ben's (rice), where parents and children were able to cook together with the aim of promoting family cooking. He was also present at the Ben's Beginners, which was about culinary transmission to young children.

=== Awards ===
Jean Sulpice is the youngest French cook to receive two Michelin stars. He won the first one at the age of 26, and the second one 5 years later at the age of 31. He is now working towards getting his third Michelin Star. Furthermore, Jean Sulpice also has four Gault-Millau chef hats.

Jean Sulpice was named "Cook of the Year" in the 2018 edition of the Gault et Millau Guide.

== Notable television appearances ==
=== Guest appearances ===
- On 25 February 2012, Planète gourmande, a France 3 TV Show presented by Joël Robuchon, Sophie Robuchon and Annabelle Robuchon welcomed Jean Sulpice.Joël Robuchon, a well-known chef, made his "Eggs Casserole with Gorgonzola", followed by a quick broadcast presenting Jean Sulpice and his restaurant. The young chef presented his famous "Beaufort foam, herbs and mountain flowers, beetroot coulis" and "duck with spiced carrots."
- On 26 September 2013, Jean Sulpice participated to 24 minutes chrono (Cooking TV Show), presented by Laurent Mariotte. Season five's program was dedicated to Savoy. Amongst other dishes, they prepared "Ceps eggs" and "Trout pastilla", typical high class food from the Savoy region.
- On 1 November 2013, Jean Sulpice hosted and judged the popular TF1 television show MasterChef France during the 4th season. He welcomed the eight contestants and the TV team in his restaurant. They were divided into 2 teams (red and yellow) and the main goal of this test was to learn how to work in teams. They had to reproduce two of his famous recipes : Beaufort foam, herbs and mountain flowers, beetroot coulis and Grenoble's walnuts plus féra fillet, quail eggs and cucumber jelly in one and a half hour. The tasting was done by the panel of judges (Frédéric Anton, Yves Camdeborde, Sebastien Demorand and Amandine Chaignot) and also by Jean Sulpice himself, to decide which team had done the best imitation.
- On 6 December 2013, he hosted Masterchef Se Met à Table (Season 4 Episode 10)on TF1. Jean Sulpice exposed his daily habits : 3 times per year, at 5am, he goes to his Beaufort's producer by foot (45 minutes to go there) to get cheese for his famous recipes (such as Beaufort foam). He introduced his restaurant, his partnership with his wife, Magali Sulpice (wine waiter) and with Marc Veyrat (chef). The TV team accompanied him, to illustrate the importance of cooking with wild plants and the name of his restaurant. He explained how the cooking passion was transferred from his father, to himself and probably on to his son.

=== Member of a panel ===
Jean Sulpice also was panelist for Un dîner presque parfait : le combat des régions. is a M6 cooking TV Show presented by Stéphane Rotenberg. This TV Show regroups the 16 new winners of Un Dîner presque parfait 2010 edition. Each winner represents his own region during the confrontation, and Cyril Lignac judged each region with a specific panelist per region. Jean Sulpice was the South of France panelist. In 2010, the TV Show began on 23 August and ended on 27 September of the same year.

On 30 August 2010, during the second week of competition, Jean Sulpice and Cyril Lignac proposed 3 tests to determine the winner of the week.

- First test : Enhancing carrots
- Second test : Cooking an octopus (judgement was mainly based on the time and quality of cooking)
- Third test : Creating their own dish
  - Finally, after the tasting, the chefs decided to attribute all the points to Delphine, who was therefore promoted South region Champion.

On 20 September 2010, it was the quarter-finals (first part) and the semi-finals (second part). During the first part Jean Sulpice and the other chefs judged the contestants in an amusement park (Disneyland Paris). During the second part, they judged them in the Palace of Versailles, near Paris.

The final took place on 27 September 2010. Jean Sulpice and the rest of the panel judged the last 2 contestants in a Paris-Bruxelles train, and in a 50m high basket.

== Private life ==
Jean Sulpice is married to Magali Sulpice, who is also the sommelier of Restaurant Jean Sulpice. The couple has two children.

== Bibliography ==
- Philippe Boé, Jean Sulpice, Jean-François Mallet. Altitude 2300m. Paris, France: Glénat. 256p.(2008)
- Jean Sulpice. Cuisine en Famille. Paris, France: M6 Eds. 321p. (2010)
- Jean-Philippe Durand, Jean Sulpice. Jean Sulpice Val Thorens: D'un hiver à l'autre (55 recettes) Val Thorens, France: Glénat. 189p. (2013)
