= Jean-Luc Rabanel =

French chef

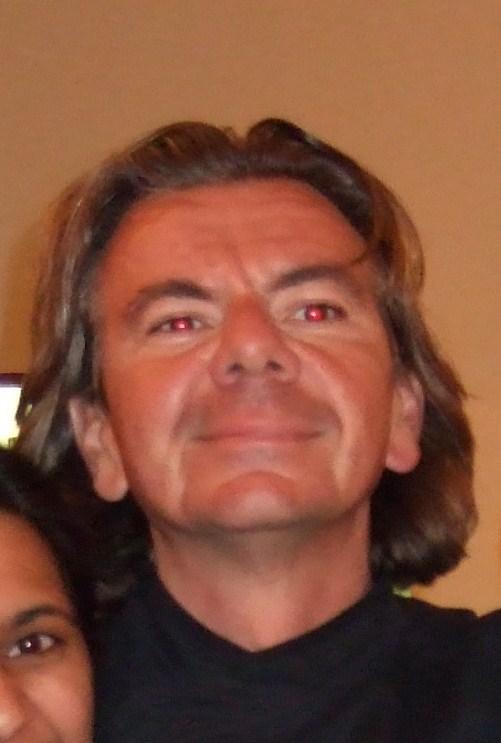
- Rabanel in 2008.
- Born: 14 January 1964 (age 62); Villeneuve-sur-Lot, France
- Culinary career
- Cooking style: Vegetarian cuisine (80%)
- Ratings
- Michelin stars; Gault Millau (19/20)
- Current restaurants
- L'Atelier (Arles); À côté (Arles)
- Website: www.rabanel.com

Jean-Luc Rabanel (born 14 January 1964) is a French chef, two stars at the Guide Michelin. He is the owner of the restaurant L'Atelier located in Arles since 2006.

== Career ==
Jean-Luc Rabanel received his first Michelin star in 1999 for the restaurant he founded in Tonneins in 1995. His restaurant L'Atelier received a Michelin macaron in spring 2007. The same year, Jean-Luc Rabanel was named "extra creator of the year" by the food guide Omnivore. He was named "Chef of the Year 2008" by the Gault Millau. The same year, he founded the bistro restaurant À Côté, located in Arles.

In 2009, he received his second Michelin star for his restaurant L'Atelier, and was also named Chevalier (Knight) of the Ordre des Arts et des Lettres in October of that year. In 2012, L'Atelier received 5 toques and a grade of 19/20 by the Gault Millau, which classes the restaurant among the 16 most prestigious of France.

== Cooking style ==
Jean-Luc Rabanel has been the first Michelin starred chef to cook organic cuisine. Having developed the importance for vegetarian cuisine, he uses vegetables at 80% of his dishes. The restaurant L'Atelier owns its own organic vegetable garden in Camargue.

== Honours ==
- Chevalier of the Ordre des Arts et des Lettres (2009)

== See also ==
- List of Michelin starred restaurants
