= Michel Portos =

French chef

- Born: 4 April 1963 (age 63); Marseille, France
- Culinary career
- Rating: Michelin stars
- Current restaurants: La Malthazar (Marseille); Le Poulpe (Marseille)
- Previous restaurants: Côté Théâtre (Perpignan); Le Saint-James (Bouliac)
- Website: www.malthazar.com www.lepoulpe-marseille.com

Michel Portos (born 4 April 1963) is a French chef, two stars at the Guide Michelin.

== Early life and education ==
Miche Portos was born in Marseille, the son of an accountant father and a shopkeeper mother. He became passionated by cooking since his childhood from his mother who, despite a busy timetable, alwayes used to prepare him dishes. However, he first managed a career as a diver or a biker at the Gendarmerie Nationale. Despite the advice of his father who assigned him a career in accountancy or commerce, Michel Portos finally decided to fully dedicate himself on cooking. After obtaining his high school final exam, he started a training course at the hotel high school of Marseille and graduated with a CAP (Certificat d'Aptitude Professionnelle) in cooking in 1983.

== Career ==
Michel Portos began his career with internships in restaurants of the Bordeaux region, first at the Chapon Fin and then in 1986 at the Rouzic with the Michelin starred chef Michel Gautier. In 1989, he continued his training course in Toulouse at the restaurant Les Jardins de l'Opéra. It is in Roanne at the restaurant of the frères Troisgros that he will be trained to become a sous-chef for five years. In 1998, he founded his first restaurant Coté Théâtre in Perpignan, which obtained one star at the Guide Michelin in 2001. He became in 2002 the chef of the hotel-restaurant Le Saint-James in Bouliac, where he permitted the establishment to obtain its second Michelin star in 2009. Michel Portos was named "Cuisinier de l'année" in 2012 by the Gault Millau. The same year, he left the Bordeaux region and Le Saint-James to establish in Marseille, where he founded his second restaurant Le Malthazar. He founded in 2014 a second restaurant in Marseille named Le Poulpe, located at the Old Port.

== See also ==
- List of Michelin starred restaurants
