= Philippe Labbé =

French chef

Philippe Labbé is a French chef from the Champagne-Ardennes region. He has been chef de cuisine of Château de la chèvre d'Or in Eze (2 Michelin stars) and executive chef of the Shangri-La hotel in Paris.

In 2013, Labbé was named "Chef of the Year" by the Gault Millau guide.

== Honours ==
- La Chèvre d'Or (2003-2009), 2 stars (Michelin Guide) and 19/20 (Gault Millau)
- L'Abeille at the Shangri-La Paris (2009-2016), 2 stars (Michelin Guide), Chef of the Year 2014 by Gault Millau
- La tour d'Argent (2016-2019), 1 star (Michelin Guide)
