= Jean-Paul Abadie =

French chef (born 1958)

- Born: 18 February 1958 (age 68); Lannemezan, France
- Culinary career
- Ratings
- Michelin stars Gault et Millau (19/20)
- Current restaurant
- L'Amphytrion (Lorient)

Jean-Paul Abadie (born 18 February 1958) is a French chef. He was named "Chef of the Year" in 2004 by Gault et Millau and has two stars at the Guide Michelin since 2002.

== Training and career ==
Jean-Paul Abadie was born in Lannemezan in the department of Hautes-Pyrénées. In 1976, he graduated at the hotel school of Tarbes and began his professional career as a chef de partie at the Hôtel Trianon Palace in Versailles. In 1978, he arrived in Brittany and obtained job of chef de partie at the Sofitel of Quiberon.

It is in March 1985 that he founded his restaurant L'Amphytrion located in Lorient in the department of Morbihan, where he obtained his first Michelin star in 1990. He then obtained his second Michelin star in 2002. With a grade of 19/20 at the Gault et Millau, he was named "Chef of the Year" in 2004. His wife Véronique, who also worked at the restaurant L'Amphytrion and was in charge of the wine cave, was named best sommelier of the year by the Gault et Millau in 2009. The same year, Jean-Paul Abadie entered in the very closed circle of the famous chefs honored with 5 toques by the Gault et Millau.

== Culinary manner ==
The cooking philosophy of Jean-Paul Abadie is expressed in the natural work of the product and the refuse of the superfluous. According to the Gault et Millau, his cooking has a science of spices compared to the one of Olivier Roellinger and a subtility forcing on never forcing the taste.

== Personal life ==
Jean-Paul Abadie was married to Véronique Abadie, who died in 2012. The couple has two sons, Paul and Quentin, who is also a restaurateur at Lorient.

== Books ==
- Retour de Pêche. Menu Fretin. 2009. ISBN 9782917008096.

== See also ==
- List of Michelin starred restaurants
- Gault et Millau
