= Schuddebeurs, Schouwen-Duiveland =

Schuddebeurs
- Hamlet
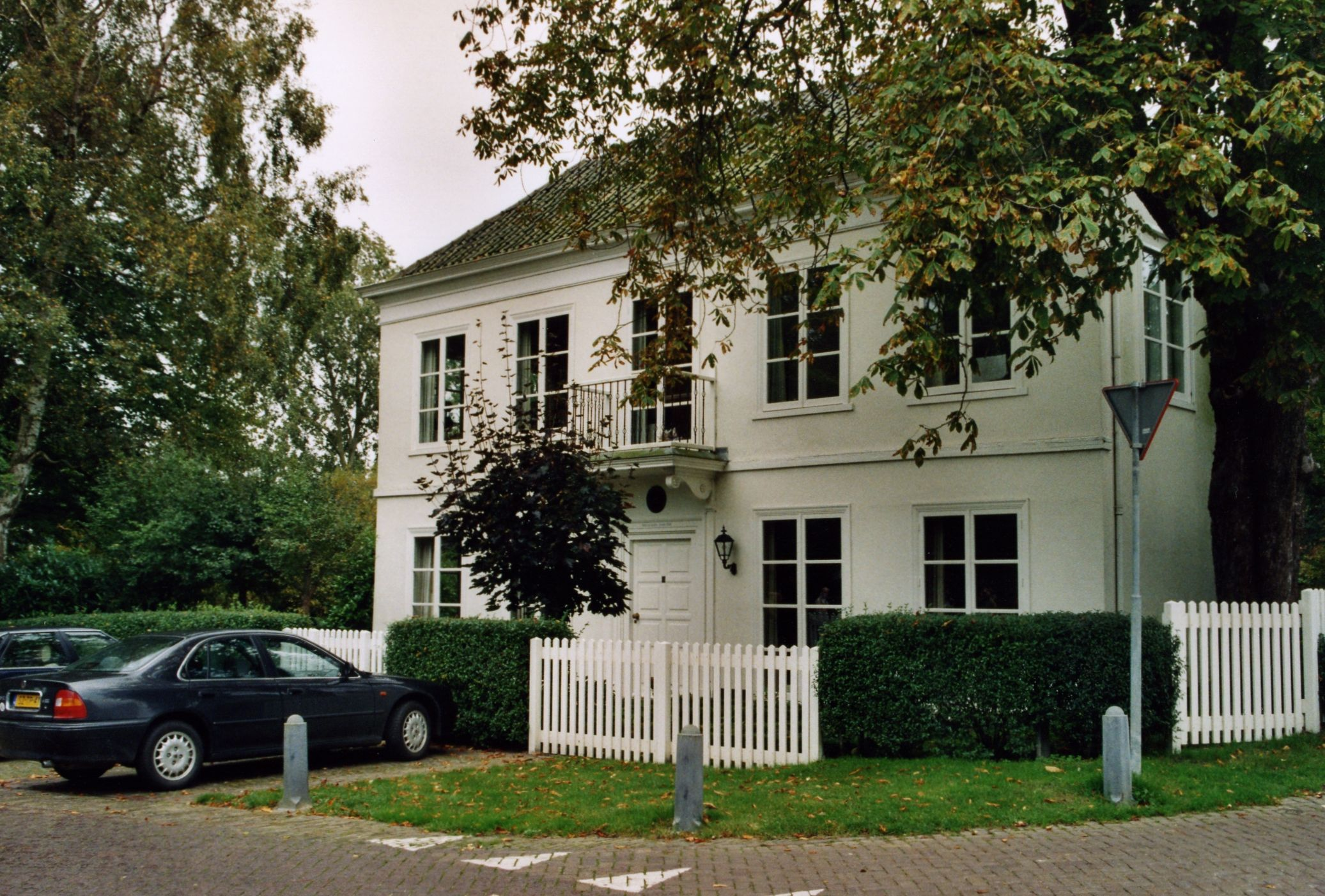
- Buitenplaats Welgelegen

- Location in the province of Zeeland in the Netherlands Schuddebeurs (Netherlands)
- Coordinates: 51.6762°N 3.9422°E
- Country: Netherlands
- Province: Zeeland
- Municipality: Schouwen-Duiveland

Area
  - Total: 6.79 km^{2} (2.62 sq mi)
- Elevation: 0.6 m (2.0 ft)

Population (2021)
  - Total: 460
  - Density: 68/km^{2} (180/sq mi)
- Time zone: UTC+1 (CET)
  - Summer (DST): UTC+2 (CEST)
- Postal code: 4317
- Dialing code: 0111

Schuddebeurs is a hamlet in the Dutch province of Zeeland. It is a part of the municipality of Schouwen-Duiveland, and lies about 3 km north of Zierikzee.

During the 17th and 18th century, the affluent merchants from Zierikzee started to build estates in Schuddebeurs as summer residences. Schuddebeurs was home to 55 people in 1840.

== Gallery ==
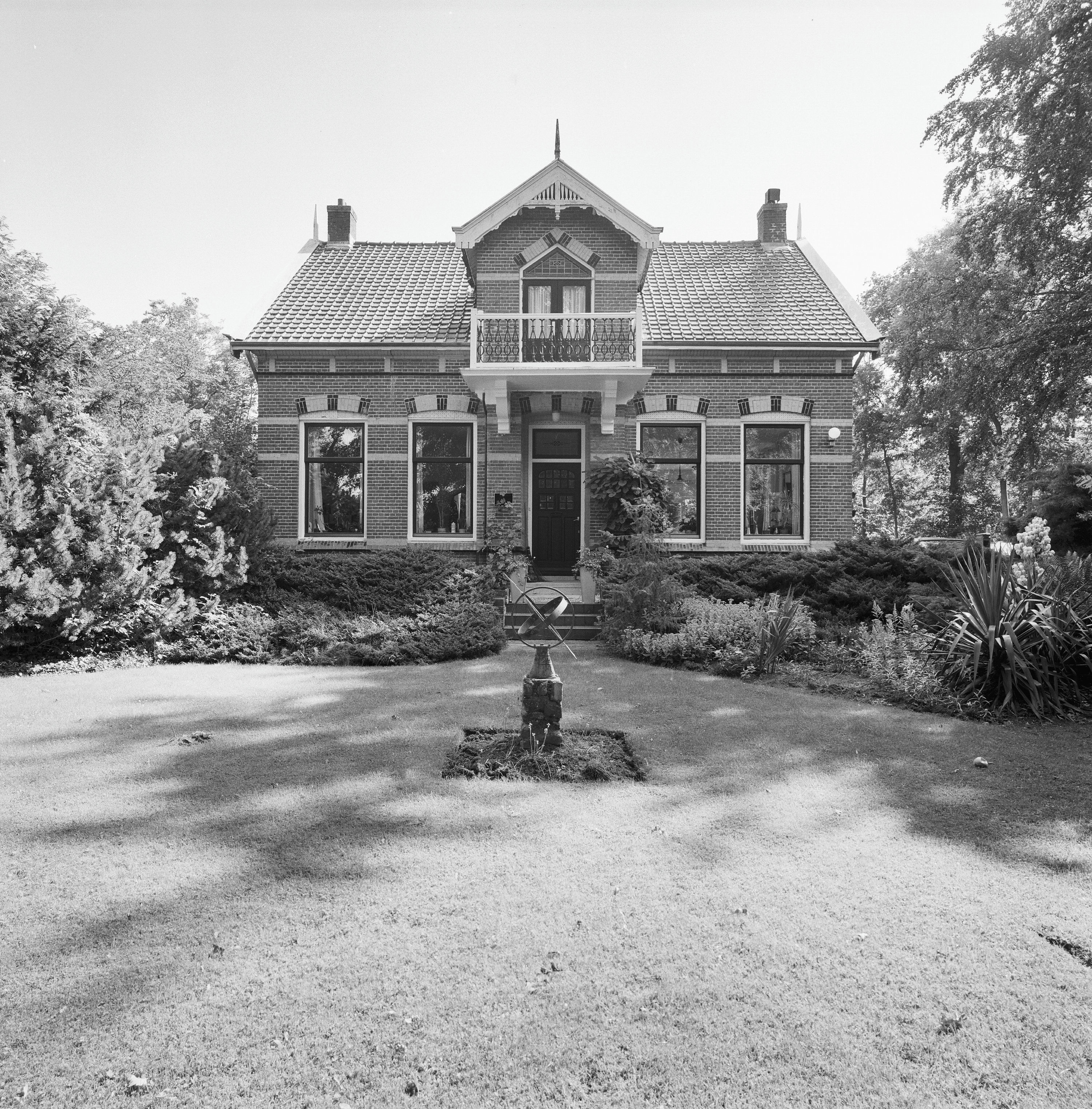
House in Schuddebeurs

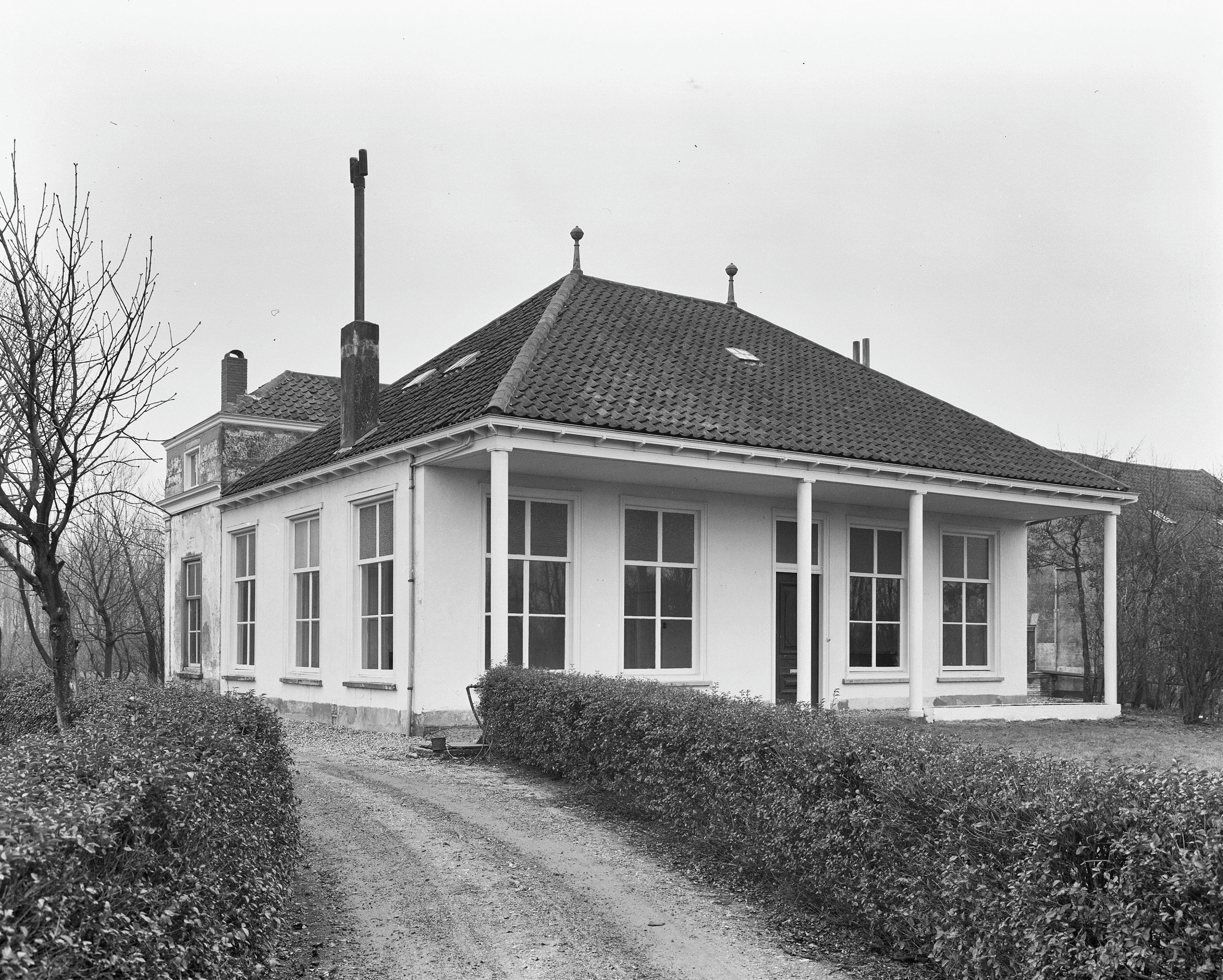
Villa in Schuddebeurs (1969)

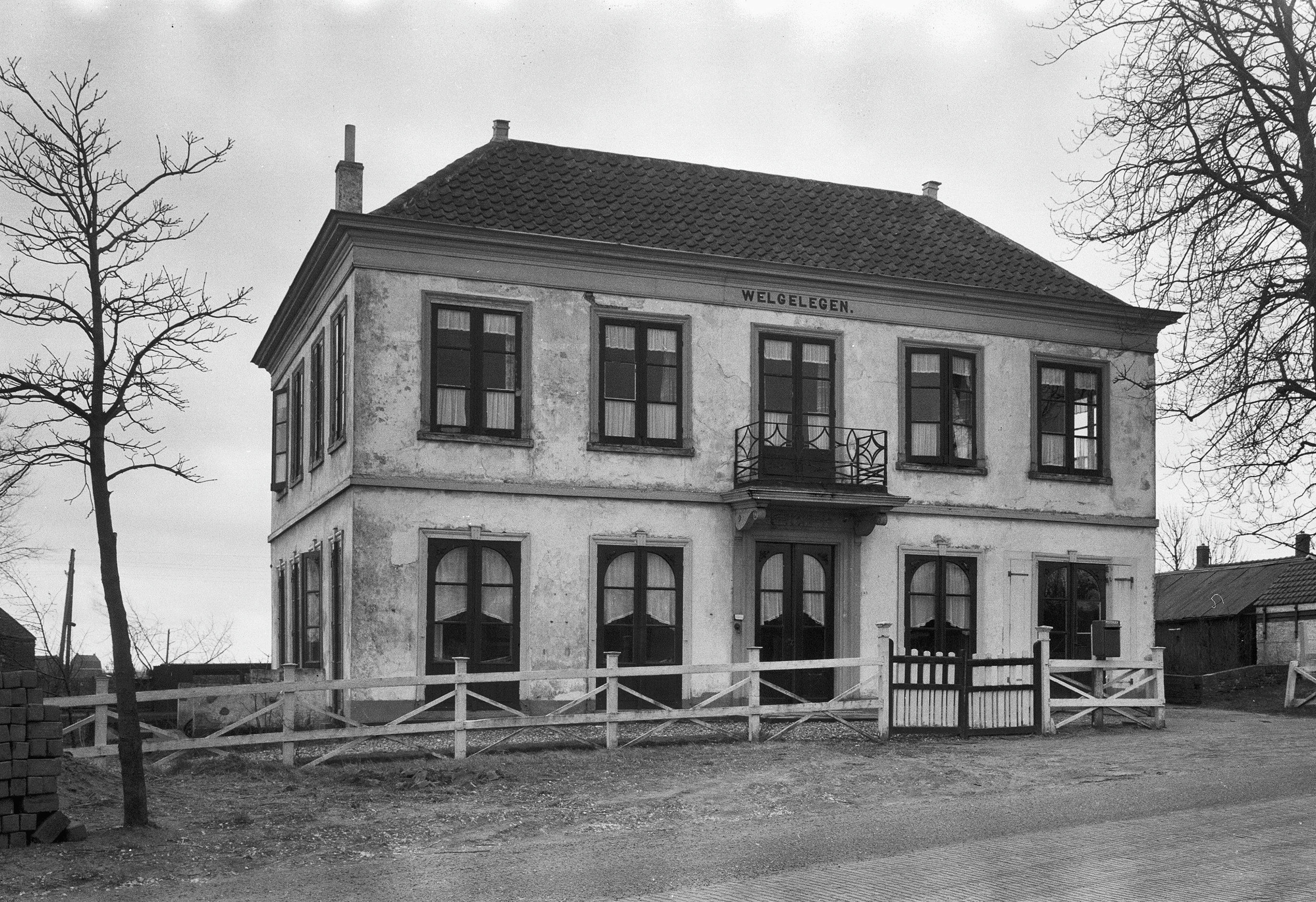
Buitenplaats Welgelegen
