= La Ferme de Mon Père =

La Ferme de Mon Père (French for "My Father's Farm") was a restaurant in Megève, France, owned by the French chef Marc Veyrat. It was famous for being one of two restaurants, both owned by Veyrat, to receive a perfect score (20/20) from the French food guidebook Gault Millau. No restaurant had earned a perfect score of 20 before because the authors of Gault Millau had thought perfection was impossible to achieve. It combined an inn with the restaurant, both operating under the same name in a reconstructed farmhouse. The restaurant also had a three-star rating from the Michelin Guide. One of the most unusual aspects of the design of the restaurant was the presence of farm animals inside the building and visible from the dining area. During your meal you could look through interior windows placed in the walls and at least one window in the floor and watch bucolic scenes from a barn including cows, chickens and other creatures. The animals were insulated aromatically from the dining area.

The restaurant was closed in 2005 and remained closed until the Zannier group purchased the chalet complex and fully renovated during 2011. The restaurant, spa and luxury chalet is operated now under the name of Le Chalet Zannier.
