= Roger Souvereyns =

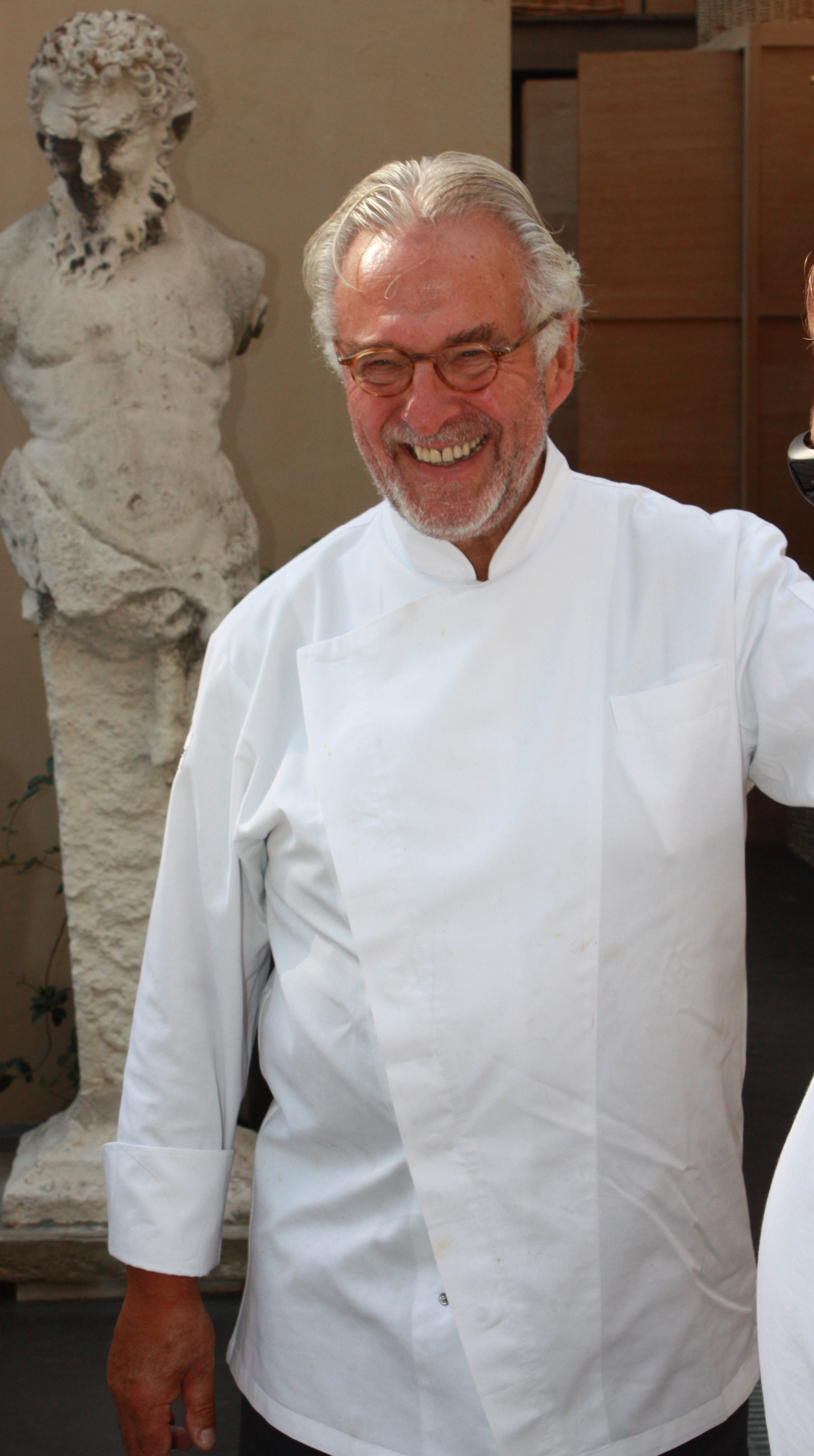
Roger Souvereyns

Roger Souvereyns (born 2 December 1938 in Vliermaal) is a Belgian Michelin-starred chef and former restaurant owner. He received two Michelin stars in the period from 1985 to 1993 for his cooking skills in Scholteshof.

== Career ==
Roger Souvereyns started his career in 1953 as an apprentice. Then he gained experience in restaurants in Brussels and Paris. Between 1961 and 1979 he opened various shops in the Hasselt area, a caterer shop on the Grote Markt in Hasselt, and several restaurants - Salons Van Dijck in Kermt, Sir Anthony Van Dyck in Antwerp, and Clou Doré in Liège. He sold them in 1979. In 1983 he bought and renovated the Scholteshof farm in Stevoort and opened a restaurant. He was one of the first to offer a farm-to-table concept. After the closure and sale of his restaurant at the beginning of the 2000s, he became the Culinary Director at the Flanders Hotel Holding in 2003.

== Works ==
- 1990 Der Scholteshof in Flandern
- 1998 Feine leichte Kräuterküche
