= Marc Veyrat =

French chef from the Haute-Savoie region (born 1950)

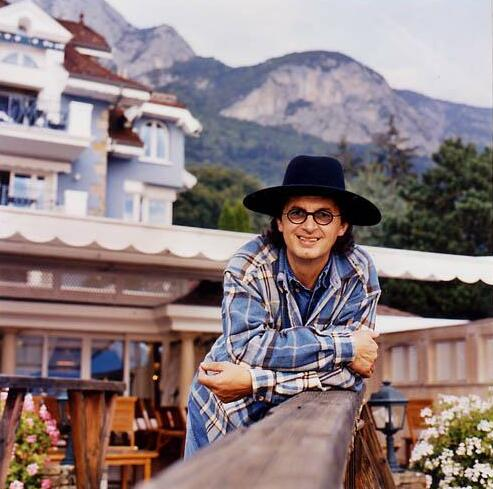
- Born: Marc Veyrat; 8 May 1950 (age 76); Annecy, Haute-Savoie, France
- Culinary career
- Cooking style: French
- Rating(s): 2 Michelin stars (La Maison de Marc Veyrat, La Ferme de mon Père, La Maison des Bois) 20/20 Gault Millau Rating (La Maison de Marc Veyrat, La Ferme de mon Père)
- Current restaurant: La Maison des Bois (Manigod)
- Previous restaurant(s): La Maison de Marc Veyrat, La Ferme de mon Père
- Website: www.marcveyrat.fr

Marc Veyrat (born 8 May 1950) is a French chef from the Haute-Savoie region, who specialises in molecular gastronomy and the use of mountain plants and herbs.

Veyrat has obtained a total of nine Michelin Stars and is the first cook to get the perfect grade of 20/20 in the Gault et Millau guide for each of his two first restaurants.

He was the owner of the restaurants La Maison de Marc Veyrat (or l'Auberge de l'Eridan) in Veyrier-du-Lac and la Ferme de mon Père in Megève. He currently operates the restaurant La Maison des Bois in Manigod. All three restaurants obtained three stars. In 2019, Veyrat was awarded two Michelin Stars for La Maison des Bois, and sued Michelin saying that the loss of one star was a miscommunication.

On 24 February 2009, he announced that he would cease all of his activities at la Maison de Marc Veyrat due to his declining health. The hotel is currently being run by his children.

He started a chain of organic "fast-food" restaurants all over France called la Cozna Vera. The first one opened in Annecy in 2008 and was later closed in 2010. He has plans to build other restaurants in Épagny, Brussels, and Paris.

His work was featured on the Discovery Channel's Discovery Atlas: France Revealed.

In December 2015, Veyrat was fined €100,000 by a French court after illegally cutting down 7,000 sq metres of protected forest near one of his restaurants.

== Cuisine ==
Marc Veyrat is known for his creativity and use of natural and organic ingredients. He specialises in molecular gastronomy. Rather than using butter, flour, eggs, oil, or cream, he instead uses roots, mountain plants, mountain herbs, and wild flowers harvested in the French Alps.

== Controversy ==
In 2015, Veyrat was fined €100,000 by a French court for illegally destroying 7,000 sq metres of protected forest in the Alps and for ordering a large area of protected wetlands to be dried up. On top of the fine, the court ordered him to restore the wetlands.

After losing his third Michelin star in the 2019 edition of the Red Guide which appeared in January 2019, he asked in July to be removed from the guide, but Michelin refused. In September 2019, he filed a suit against Michelin demanding a full explanation for the lost star, including the notes made by inspectors at the time of their visit and the explicit reasons for the removal of the star. He described the suggestion that he had used an English cheese in one of his dishes as "profoundly offensive" and "worse than the loss of my parents". However, the judges held that "the independence of the evaluation constitutes the liberty of expression of the guide's inspectors," and ordered him to pay the court costs.

== Gallery ==
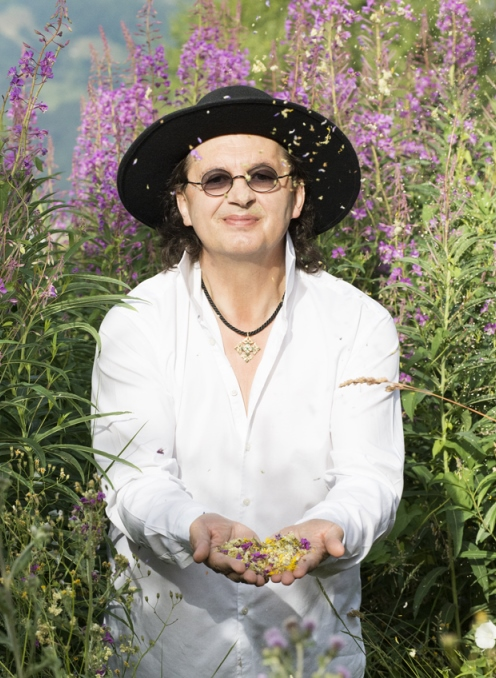

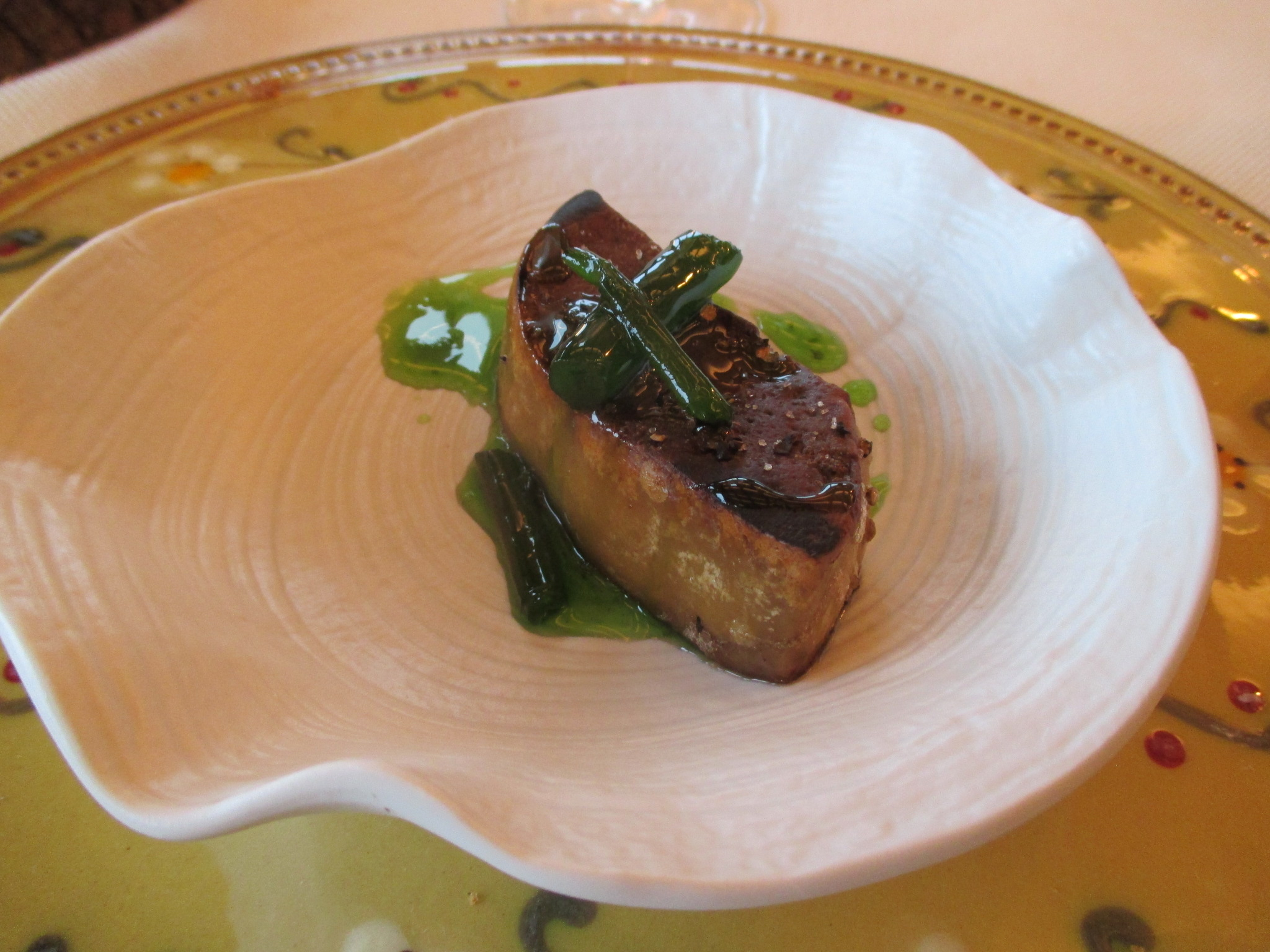

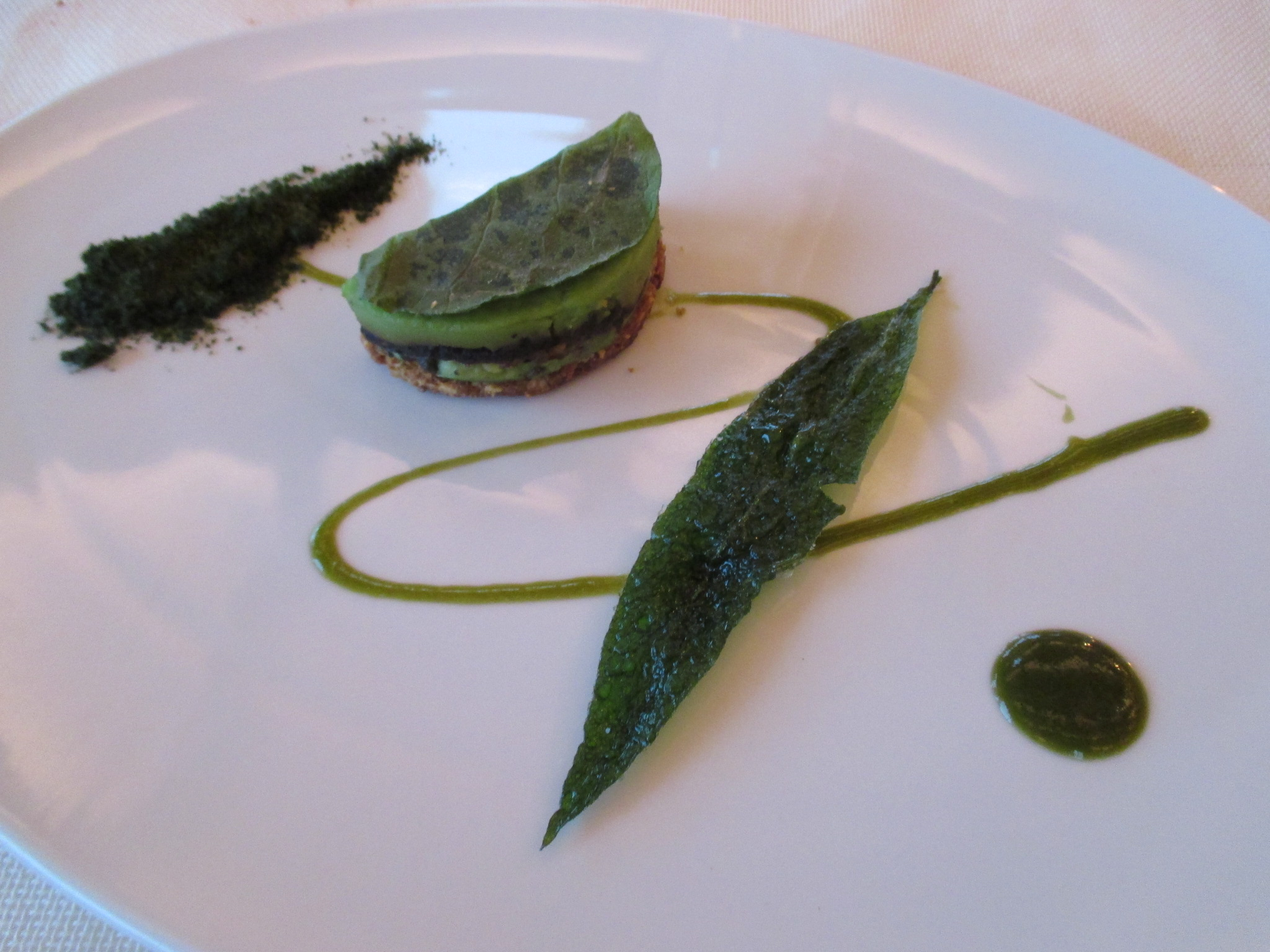

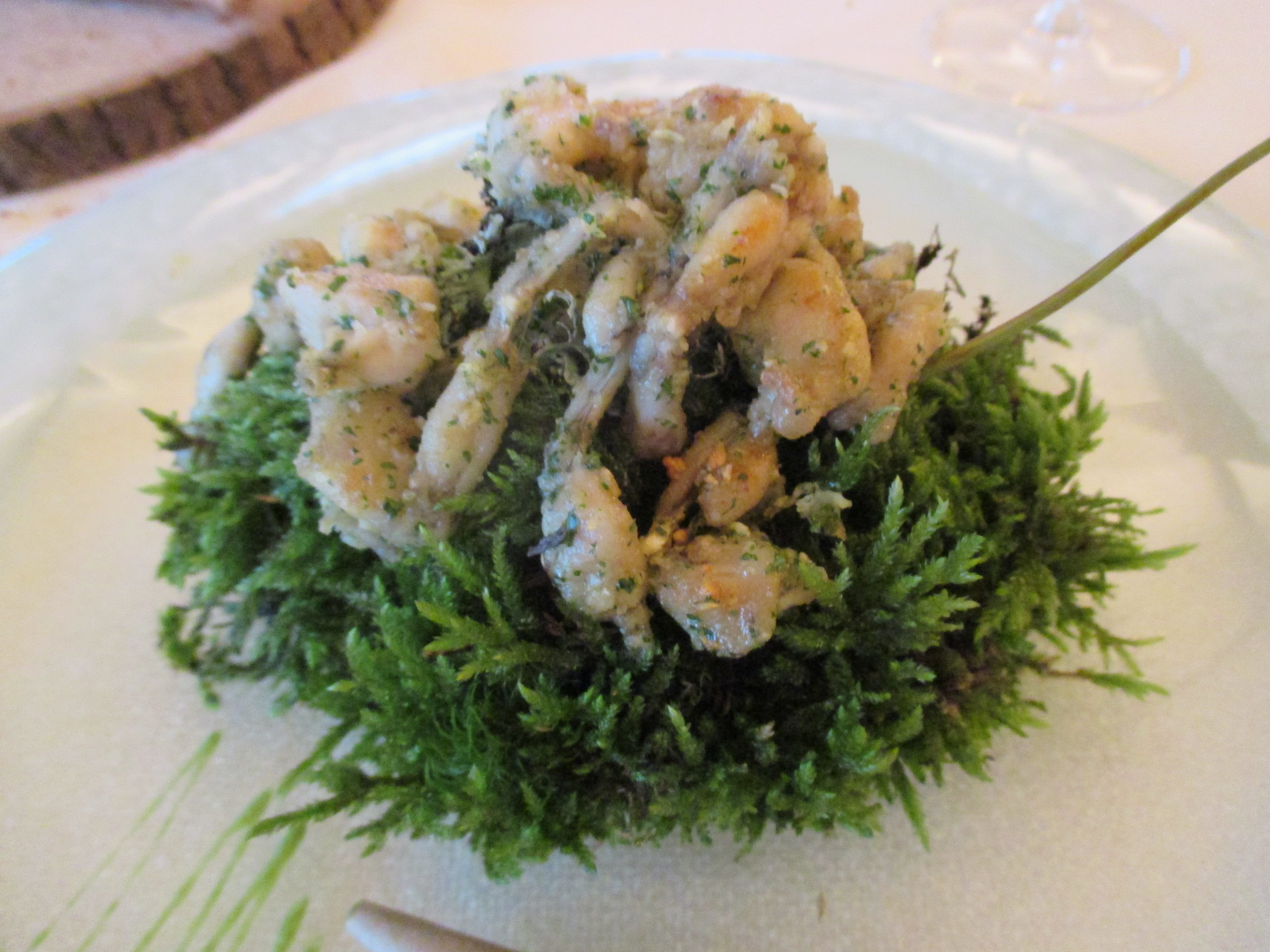

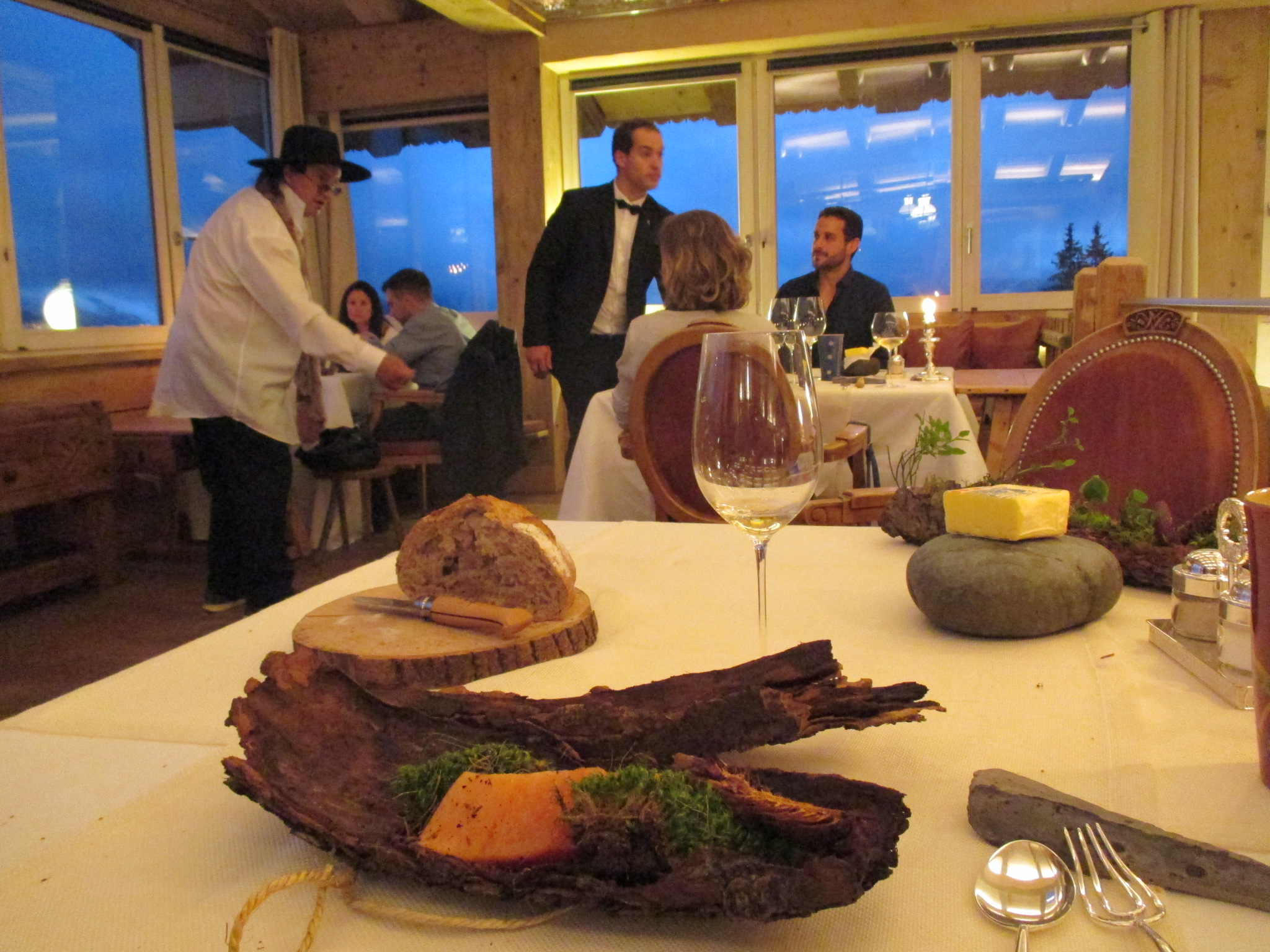

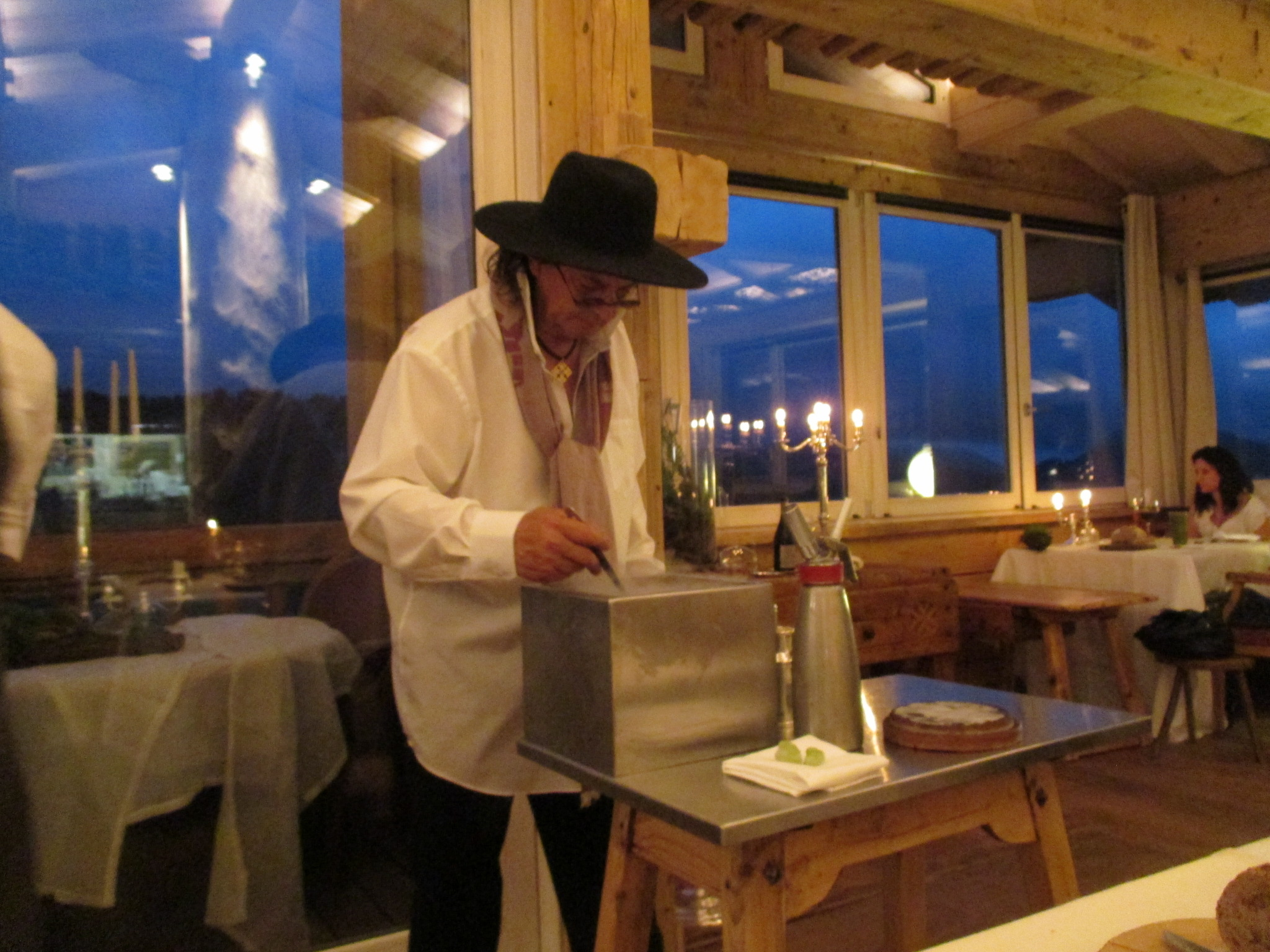

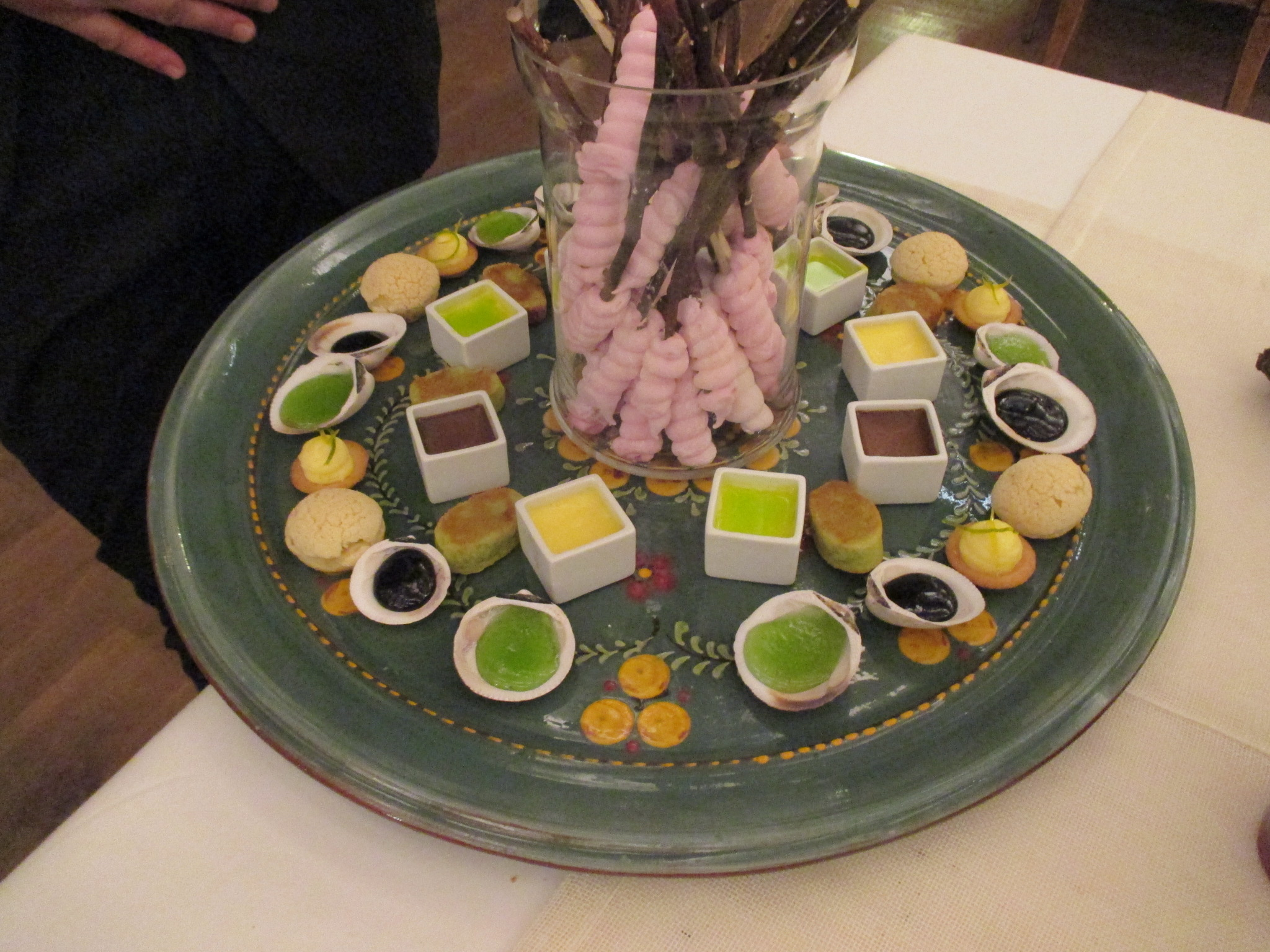

Click on images to enlarge

== Bibliography ==
- Fou de saveurs (1994)
- Herbier gourmand (1997)
- La cuisine paysanne (1998)
- Quatre saisons (à la carte) (2000)
- L'herbier des montagnes – Tout savoir sur les plantes et les fleurs d'altitude (2000)
- Déguster les plantes sauvages (2003)
- L'encyclopédie culinaire du XXIe siècle (2003)
- L'herbier à croquer (2004)
- Le gibier en 80 recettes (2004)
- Herbier gourmand (2004)
- Cuisine paysanne (2005)
