= Gault Millau =

French restaurant guide

Gault et Millau (French pronunciation: [ɡo e mijo]), formerly Le Nouveau Guide Gault-Millau is a French restaurant guide. It was founded by two restaurant critics, Henri Gault and Christian Millau, in 1969 and sold to the magazine Le Point in 1983.

== Points system ==
Gault-Millau rates restaurants on a scale of 1 to 20, the French school grading system. From 14-20 corresponds to American A. Restaurants given below 10 points (fail) are rarely listed. The points are awarded based on the quality of the food, with comments about service, price or the atmosphere of the restaurant given separately. Based on this rating, high-ranking restaurants may display one to five toques. Gault Millau does not accept payment for listing restaurants.

Under its original authors and for many years after they left in the 1990s, Gault-Millau never awarded a score of 20 points, under the argument that perfection is beyond the limitations of a normal human being. In 2004, two restaurants, both of chef Marc Veyrat, the Maison de Marc Veyrat (or L'Auberge de l'Eridan) in Veyrier-du-Lac near Annecy and La Ferme de Mon Père ("My Father's Farm") in Megève, received this score. In 2010 and 2011, Sergio Herman's Oud Sluis also received a score of 20/20. To some, this reflects a fall of standards in the guide after it changed from employing a permanent editorial and tasting staff to using local agents.

== Differences from Michelin ==
There has been discussion about which guide is more important, the Michelin Guide or the Gault-Millau. In the 1970s the Michelin's continued conservative support of traditional haute cuisine was challenged by the support of nouvelle cuisine by the Gault-Millau. Michelin is more popular and therefore more influential, while Gault Millau has been considered more food-focused due to the main system being based purely on the quality of the food. Gault Millau has guides for various other countries, including Netherlands, Belgium and Luxembourg, Switzerland, Germany, Austria, Serbia and Poland.

Roughly speaking, Michelin one-star restaurants have an average Gault-Millau score of 15.5, two-star restaurants have an average of 17.5, and three-star restaurants have an average score of 18.75. The majority of Gault-Millau scored restaurants have no Michelin stars. Michelin and Gault-Millau scores do not always agree: one-star restaurants can score as low as 12 and as high as 18 on the Gault-Millau rating.

== French Chef of the Year ==
- 1989 Joël Robuchon (Chef of the Century)
- 1994 Roger Souvereyns
- 2001 Luigi Ciciriello
- 2002 Nicolas Le Bec
- 2003 Michel Troisgros
- 2004 Jean-Paul Abadie
- 2005 Arnaud Magnier
- 2006 Thierry Marx
- 2007 Anne-Sophie Pic
- 2008 Jean-Luc Rabanel
- 2009 Léa Linster
- 2010 William Ledeuil
- 2011 Édouard Loubet
- 2012 Michel Portos
- 2013 Philippe Labbé
- 2014 Arnaud Lallement
- 2015 Yannick Alléno
- 2016 Alexandre Gauthier
- 2017 Alexandre Couillon
- 2018 Jean Sulpice
- 2019 Arnaud Donckele

== Chef of the Century ==
On the guide's 20th anniversary in 1990, Paul Bocuse (restaurant Paul Bocuse in Collonges-au-Mont-d'Or, near Lyon), Frédy Girardet (Restaurant de l'Hôtel de Ville) in Crissier, Switzerland), and Joël Robuchon (restaurant Jamin in Paris) were crowned "Chefs of the Century" by Gault-Millau.

== Gault&Millau's inspectors ==
The inspectors are not employees of the guide and are recruited according to a list of criteria. They pay for their own meals and do not identify themselves to the establishments they visit. Gault&Millau reports that some people take advantage of establishments by posing as guide inspectors in order to receive a free meal or service.

== See also ==
- Consumer Reports
- Harden's
- Michelin Guide
- Restaurant rating

== Sexternal links ==
- The Gault Millau website for France
- The Gault Millau for Italy
- The Gault Millau for Austria
- The Gault Millau for Switzerland
