= List of people from Catalonia =

This is a list of notable people from Catalonia.

== Artists ==
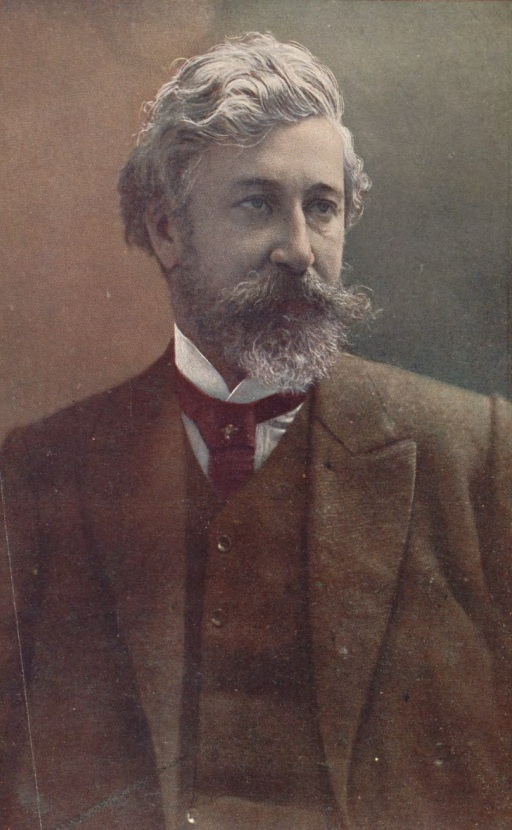
Santiago Rusiñol

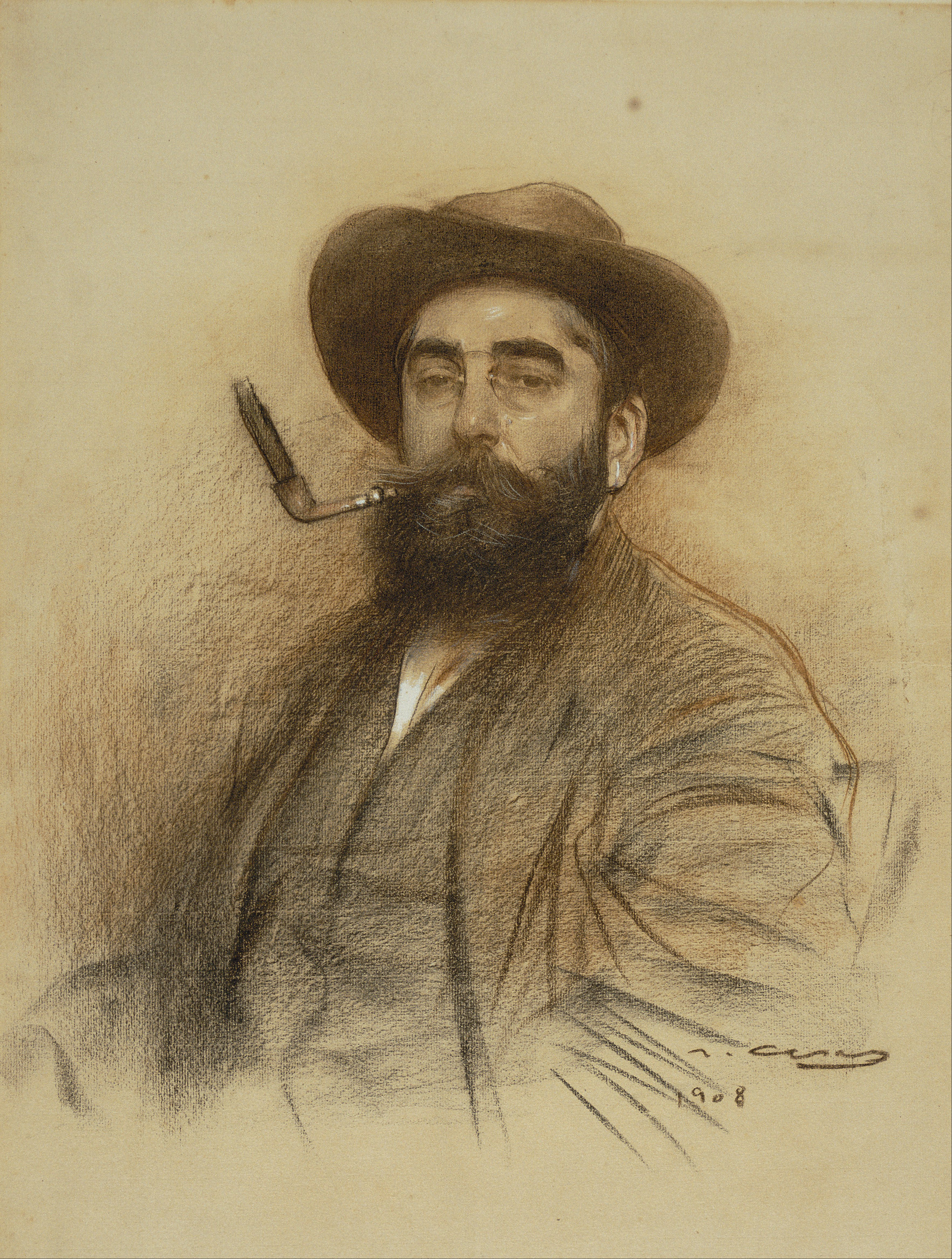
Ramon Casas i Carbó

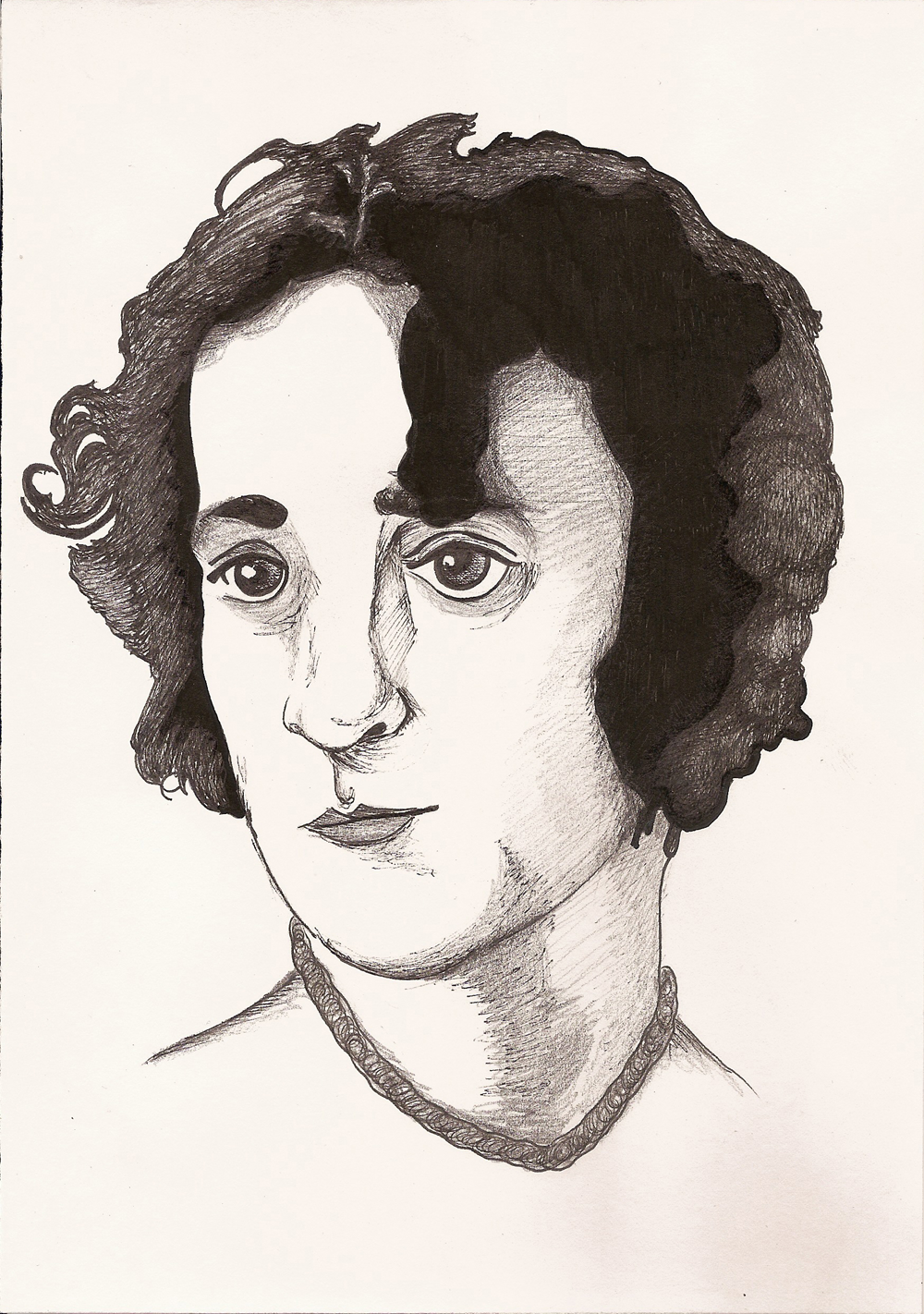
Lola Anglada

- Ferrer Bassa (1285–1348), Catalan Gothic master and miniaturist
- Arnau Bassa (????–1348), altarpiece master and son of the previous
- Jacint Rigau i Ros (1659–1743), portrait artist
- Josep Tapiró i Baró (1836–1913), watercolour painter and fundamental member of Orientalism
- Marià Fortuny i Marsal (1838–1874), painter
- Josep Masriera (1841–1912), painter, goldsmith, and businessman
- Étienne Terrus (1857–1922), painter considered one of the precursors of fauvisme
- Eliseu Meifrèn (1857–1940), impressionist painter
- Aristide Maillol (1861–1944), sculptor and painter
- Santiago Rusiñol (1861–1931), painter, poet and playwright
- Ramon Casas i Carbó (1866–1932), artist and painter
- Ramon Pichot (1871–1925), painter
- Joaquin Mir Trinxet (1873–1940), painter
- Josefa Texidor i Torres (1875–1914), painter
- Juli González i Pellicer (1876–1942), sculptor and painter
- Josep Clarà (1878–1958), sculptor
- Pau Gargallo i Catalán (1881–1934), sculptor and painter
- Adelaida Ferré Gomis (1881–1955), lace-maker, folklorist, and teacher
- Joan Miró (1893–1983), surrealist artist
- Lola Anglada (1893–1984), illustrator and writer
- Charlie Rivel (1896–1983), clown
- Àngel Planells (1901–1989), surrealist painter

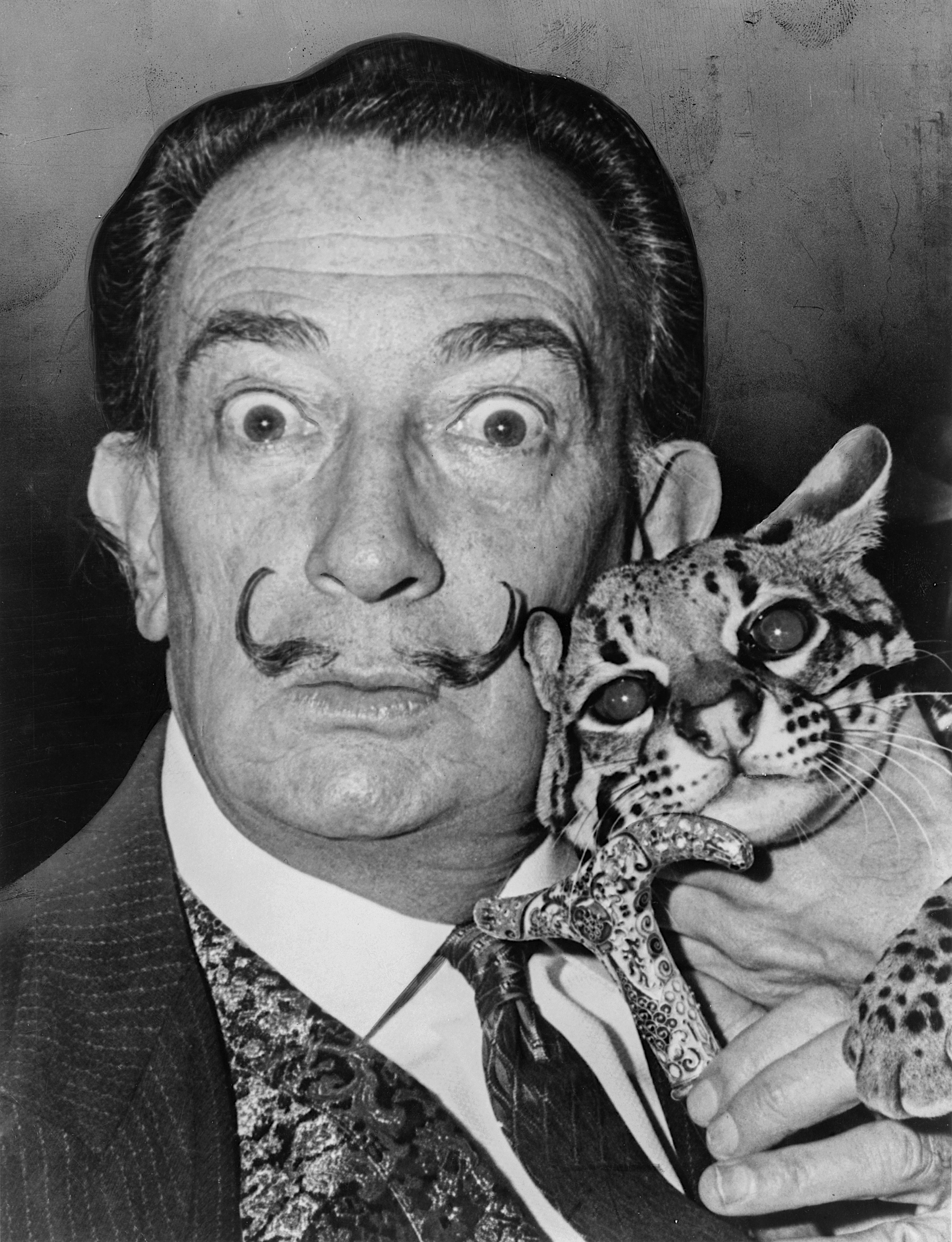
Salvador Dalí

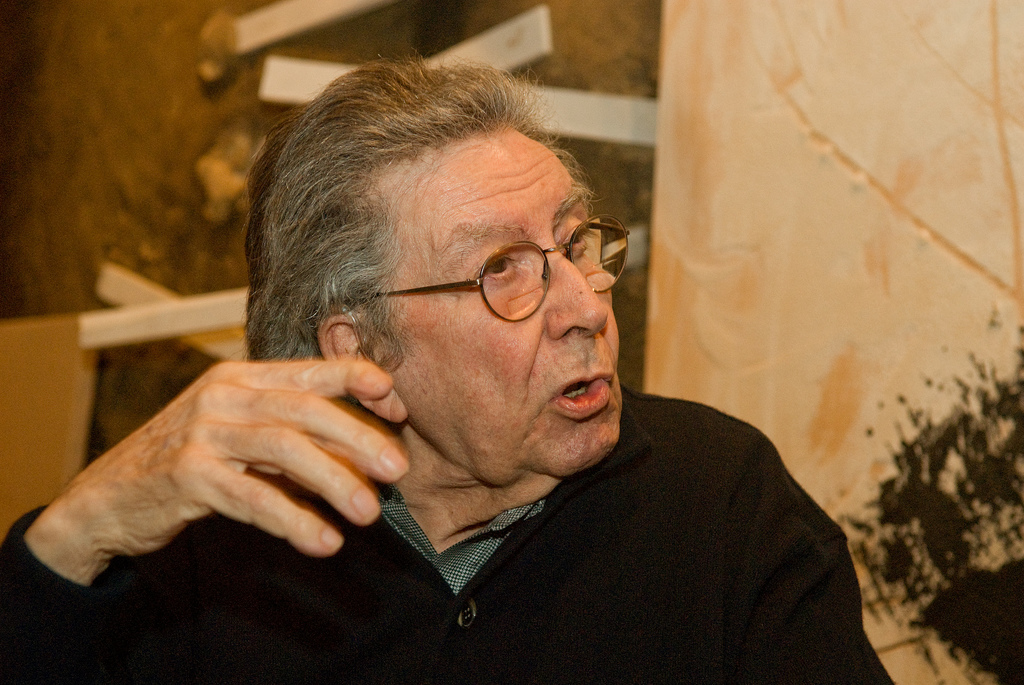
Antoni Tàpies

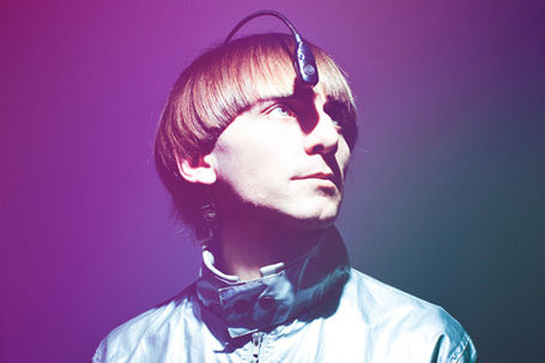
Neil Harbisson

- Salvador Dalí (1904–1989), surrealist artist
- Marti Montserrat Guillemat (1906–1990), musician
- Ceferí Olivé i Cabré (1907–1995), painter
- Remedios Varo (1908–1963), surrealist painter
- Angeles Santos Torroella (1911–2013), surrealist painter
- Antoni Clavé (1913–2005), painter, printmaker, sculptor, stage designer and costume designer
- Joan-Josep Tharrats (1918–2001), abstract artist and member of Dau al Set
- Joan Brossa (1919–1998), poet, playwright, graphic designer and visual artist
- Joan Colom (1921–2017), photographer
- Manuel Carnicer i Fajó (1922–1998), hyperrealist colour pencil artist
- Albert Ràfols-Casamada (1923–2009), artist
- Antoni Tàpies (1923–2012), surrealist painter and member of Dau al Set
- Xavier Valls (1923–2006), painter
- Modest Cuixart (1925–2001), painter and member of Dau al Set
- Marcel Martí (1925–2010), sculptor
- Joan Ponç (1927–1984), painter and member of Dau al Set
- Josep Guinovart (1927–2007), abstract expressionist painter
- Josep Maria Subirachs (1927–2014), sculptor and painter
- Josep Ponsatí (born 1947), sculptor
- Jordi Bonet (1932–1979), painter, ceramist, muralist and sculptor
- Antoni Pitxot (1934–2015), surrealist painter
- Silvia Torras (1936–1970), informalist painter
- Xavier Miserachs (1937–1998), photographer
- Vicenç Caraltó (1939–1995), painter, draftsman and engraver
- Fina Rifà (born 1939), illustrator
- Isabel Steva i Hernández, "Colita" (born 1940), photographer
- Josep Royo (born 1945), contemporary artist
- Glòria Muñoz (born 1949), painter
- Anna Manel·la (1950–2019), sculptor
- Jaume Plensa (born 1955), sculptor
- Pep Duran (born 1955], sculptor
- Pere Jaume Borrell i Guinart, "Perejaume" (born 1957), contemporary artist
- Enric Bug (born 1957), comic book artist and industrial designer
- Carlos Grangel (born 1963), character designer
- Neil Harbisson (born 1982), artist, founder of the Cyborg Foundation
- Moon Ribas (born 1985), choreographer, dancer, cyborg activist, founder of the Cyborg Foundation
- Laura Vila Kremer (born 1985), performance artist and intersex rights activist

== Architects and Urban Planners ==
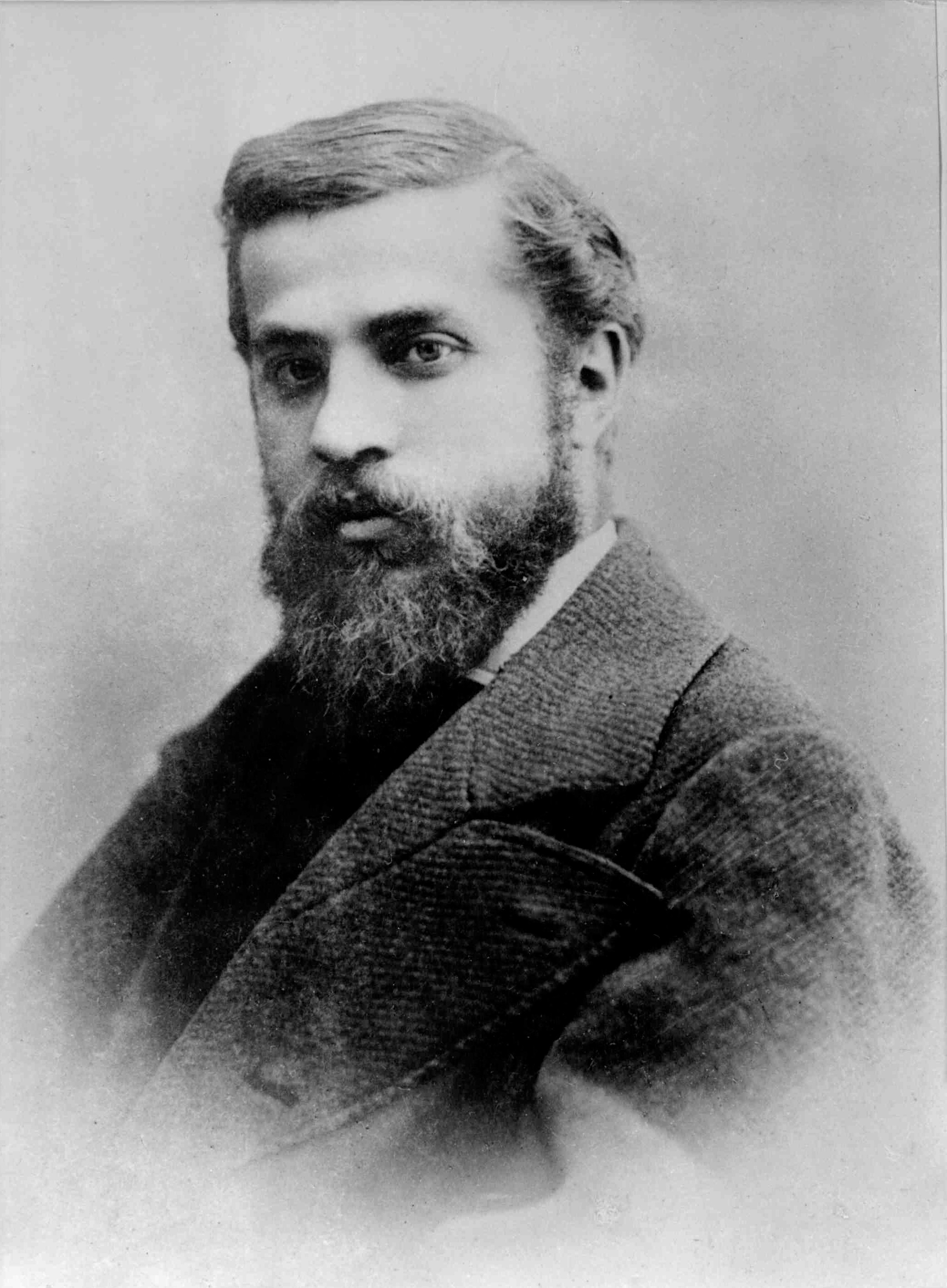
Antoni Gaudí

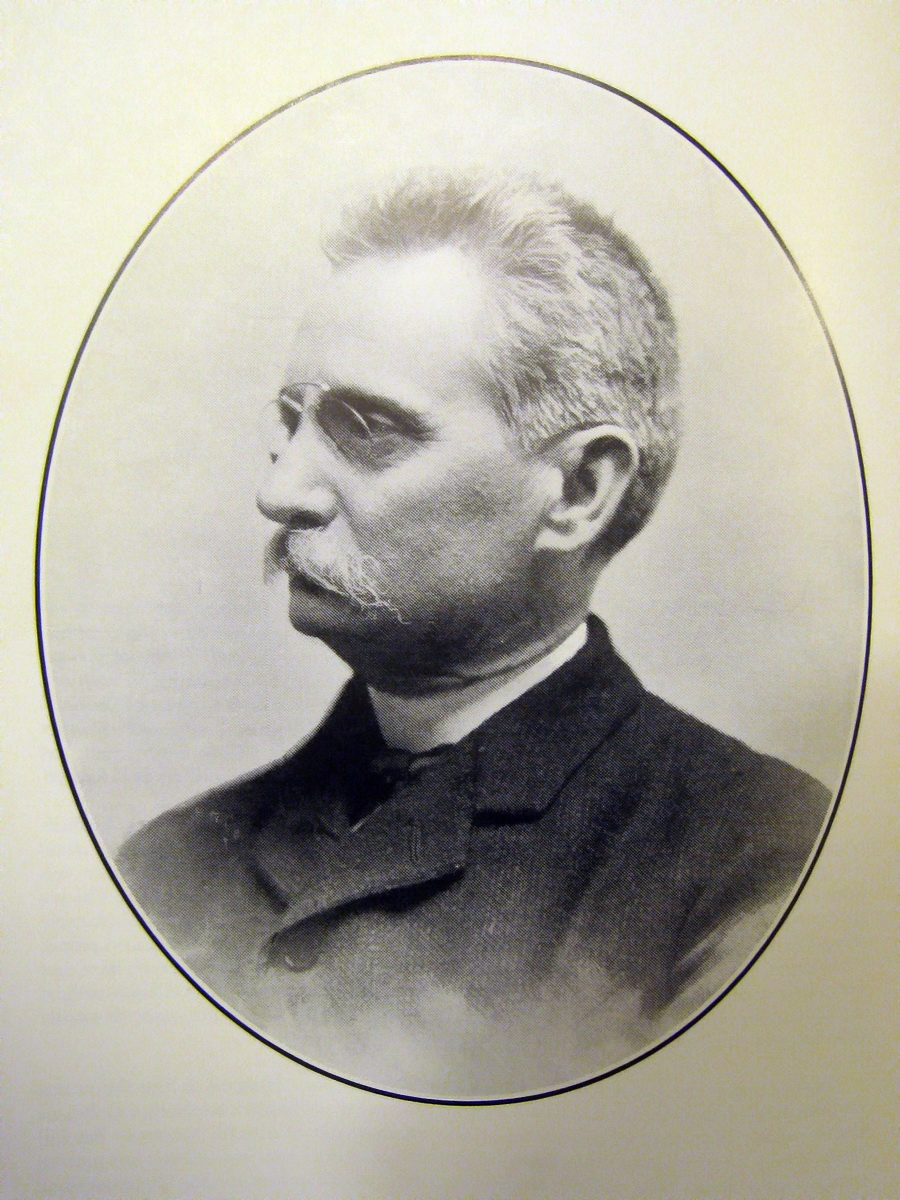
Lluís Domènech i Montaner

- Ildefons Cerdà i Sunyer (1815–1876), urban planner who designed the 19th-century "extension" of Barcelona called the Eixample
- Lluís Domènech i Montaner (1850–1923), modernist architect and politician, designed the Palau de la Música Catalana
- Antoni Gaudí (1852–1926), modernist architect, designed the Catholic church of the Sagrada Família in Barcelona
- Josep Puig i Cadafalch (1867–1956), architect, designed the urban gothic palace Casa Amatller
- Cebrià de Montoliu i de Togores (1873–1923), town planner, architect, and social reformer
- Josep Maria Jujol i Gibert (1879–1949), architect and designer; worked with Antoni Gaudí on many of his most famous works
- Isidre Puig i Boada (1891–1987), architect
- Carles Buïgas i Sans (1898–1979), architect, engineer, inventor and author; designed the Magic Fountain in Montjuïc, Barcelona
- Josep Lluís Sert i López (1902–1983), architect, co-founder of the GATCPAC group, professor at Harvard

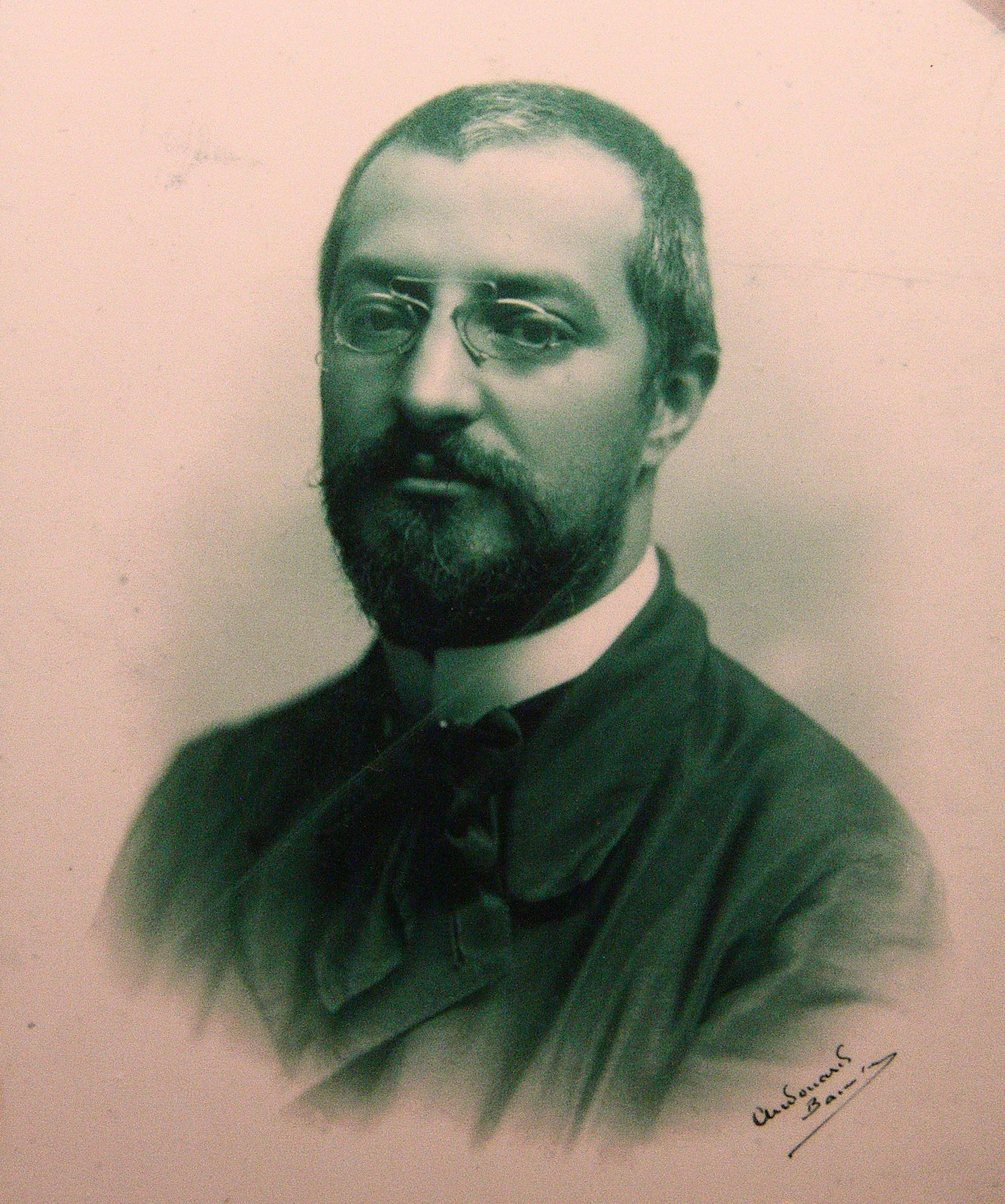
Josep Puig i Cadafalch

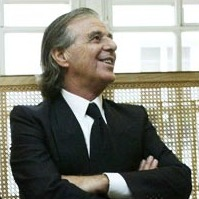
Ricardo Bofill i Leví

- Josep Antoni Coderch (1913–1984), architect recognized as one of the most important post-World War II European architects
- Antoni Bonet i Castellana (1913–1989), architect and urban planner
- Alfons Milà i Sagnier (1924–2009), architect
- Frederic de Correa i Ruiz (1924–2020), architect
- Oriol Bohigas i Guardiola (1925–2021), architect and urban planner
- Lluís Nadal i Oller (born 1929), architect
- Josep Emili Donato i Folch (born 1934), architect
- Lluís Cantallops Valeri (born 1934), architect
- Joan Margarit (1938–2021), architect
- Ricardo Bofill i Leví (1939–2022), architect
- Carme Pigem Barceló (born 1962), architect and member of the Pritzker Prize-winning architectural firm RCR Arquitectes
- Xavier Vilalta (born 1980), architect

== Businesspeople ==
- Facundo Bacardí (1814–1886), founder of Bacardi rum
- Joseph Oller (1839–1922), founder of Moulin Rouge cabaret
- Andrés Brugal Montaner (1850–1914), founder of Brugal & Co. rum
- Enric Bernat (1923–2003), founder of Chupa Chups candy
- Eusebi Güell (1846–1918), industrial entrepreneur and patronage
- John Casablancas (1942–2013), founder of Elite Model Management (American from Catalan parents)

== Cinema and Theater ==
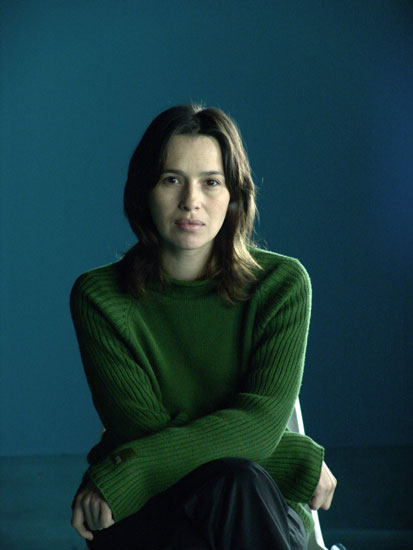
Ariadna Gil

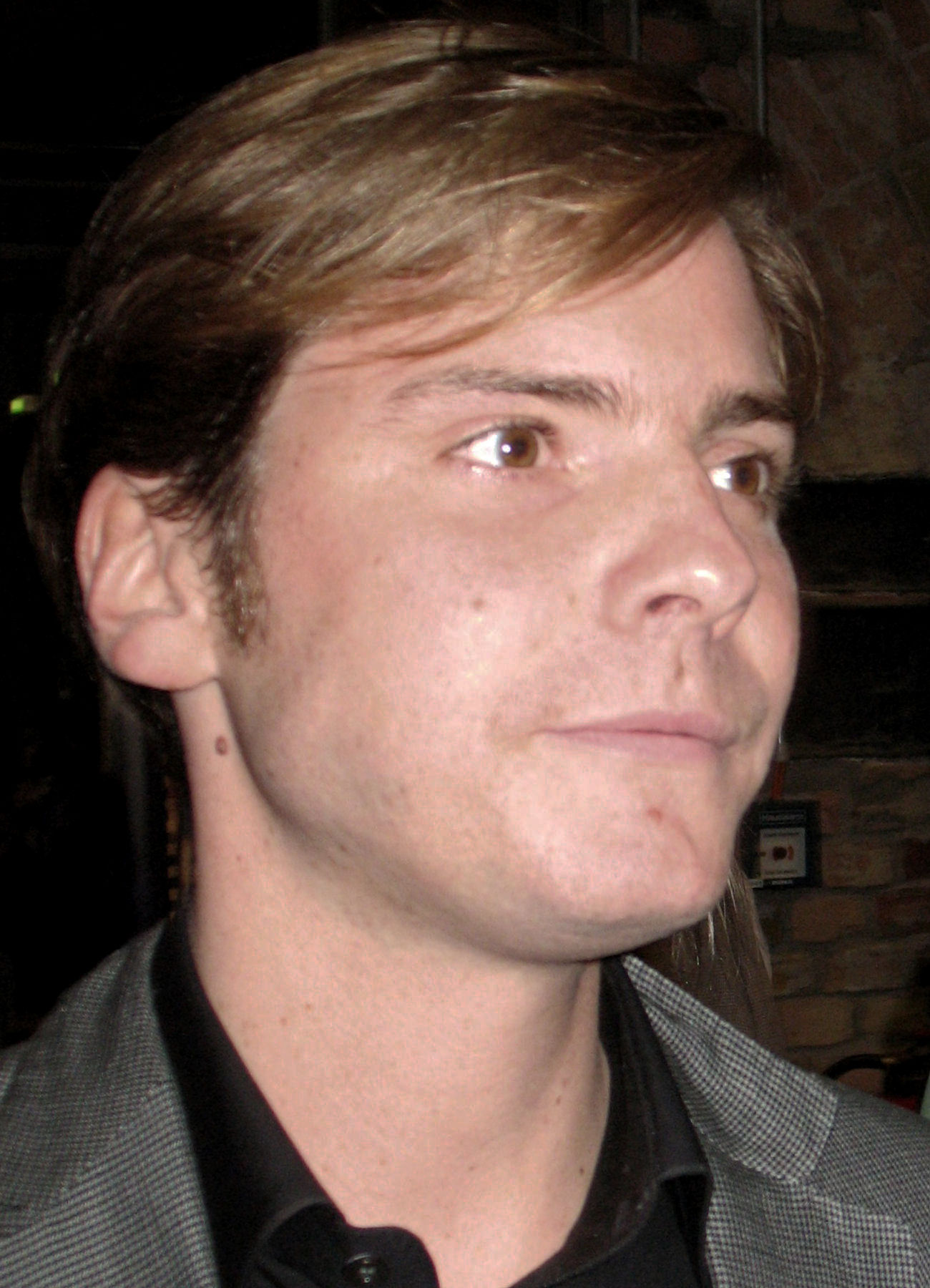
Daniel Brühl

- Fructuós Gelabert (1874–1955), inventor, screenwriter, film director
- Asunción Balaguer (1925–2019), actress
- Rosa Maria Sardà (1941–2020), actress and comedian
- Albert Boadella (born 1943), playwright, director, actor, political activist, and founder of Els Joglars
- Ventura Pons (born 1945), film director
- Bigas Luna (1946–2013), award-winning filmmaker
- Vicky Peña (born 1954), actress
- Assumpta Serna (born 1957), actress
- Francesc Orella (born 1957), actor
- Emma Vilarasau (born 1959), actress
- Isabel Coixet (born 1960), film director
- Eduard Fernandez (born 1964), actor
- Jordi Sánchez (born 1964), actor, comedian, well-known thanks to his leading roles in the popular sitcoms, Plats Bruts and La que se Avecina
- Sergi López (born 1965), actor, César's best actor winner in 2000
- Andreu Buenafuente (born 1965), comedian, television host and founder of the television production company, El Terrat
- Lydia Zimmermann (born 1966), filmmaker
- Jaume Balagueró (born 1968), film director behind REC zombie horror films
- Jordi Mollà (born 1968), actor, appeared in the Hollywood blockbusters Colombiana (2012) and Riddick (2013)
- Ariadna Gil (born 1969), actress
- Joel Joan (born 1970), actor, comedian, lead actor in the popular sitcom, Plats Bruts, filmmaker, founder of the television production company Kràmpack and former president of the Academy of Catalan Cinema
- Silvia Abril (born 1971), actress, comedian and television host
- David Selvas (born 1971), actor

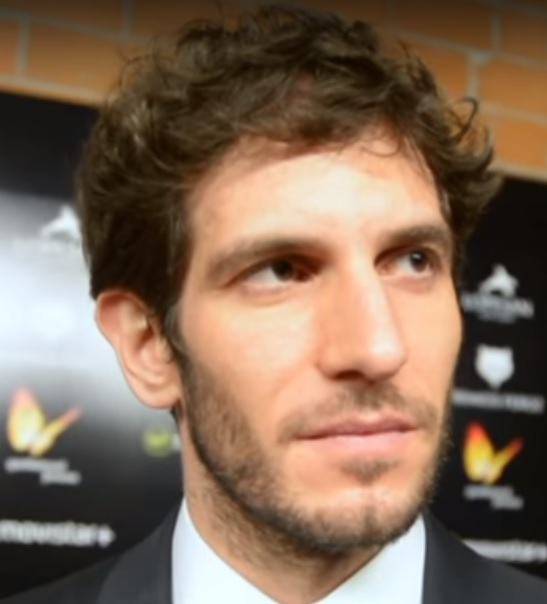
Quim Gutiérrez

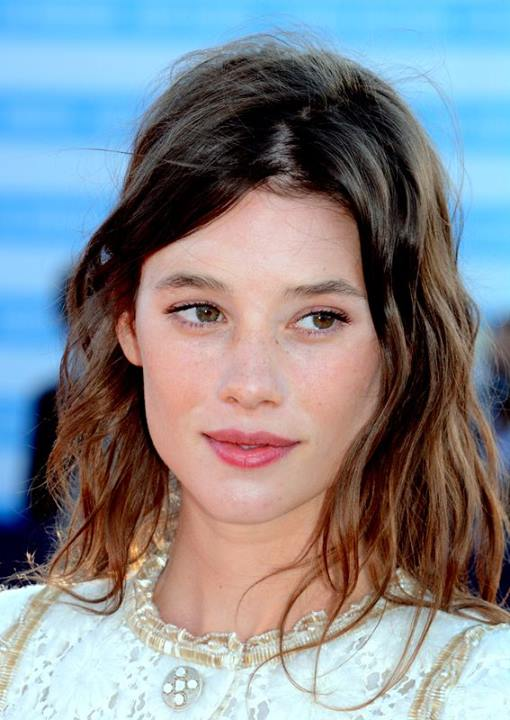
Àstrid Bergès-Frisbey

- Laia Costa (born 1985), actress
- Laia Marull (born 1973), actress
- Jaume Collet-Serra (born 1974), filmmaker known for directing the horror remake House of Wax (2005), The Shallows (2016) and the memorable action-thrillers Unknown (2011), Non-Stop (2014), Run All Night (2015) and The Commuter (2018)
- Ingrid Rubio (born 1975), actress
- Daniel Brühl (born 1978), actor, born in Barcelona and raised in Germany
- Claudia Bassols (born 1979), actress
- Leticia Dolera (born 1981), actress
- Quim Gutiérrez (born 1981), actor
- Àstrid Bergès-Frisbey (born 1986), actress, appeared in the Hollywood blockbusters Pirates of the Caribbean: On Stranger Tides (2011) and King Arthur: Legend of the Sword (2017)
- Carlos Cuevas (born 1995), actor
- David Solans (born 1996), actor

== Economists ==
- Andreu Mas-Colell (born 1944), economist
- Xavier Sala i Martin (born 1962), economist
- Pol Antràs (born 1975), economist
- Jordi Galí (born 1961), economist

== Writers and poets ==
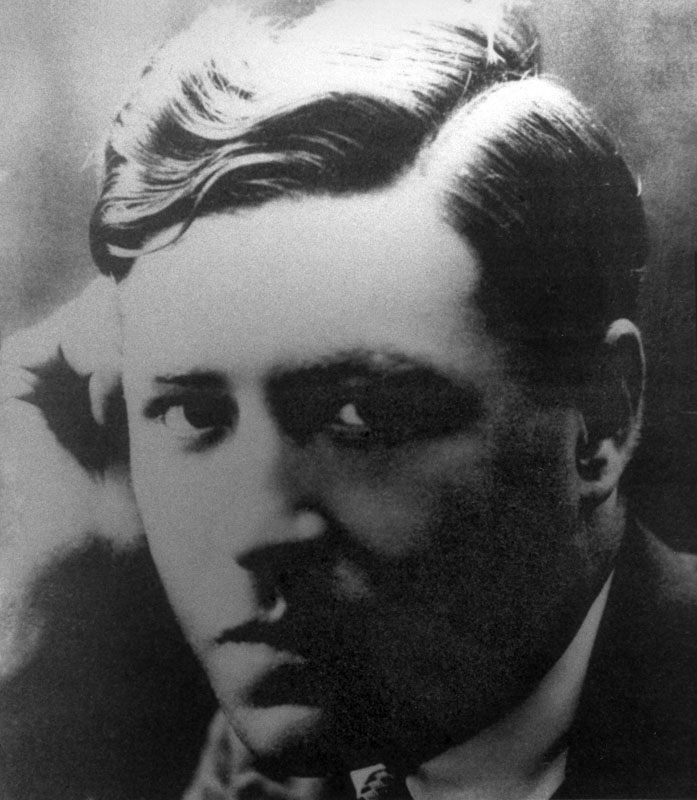
Josep Pla

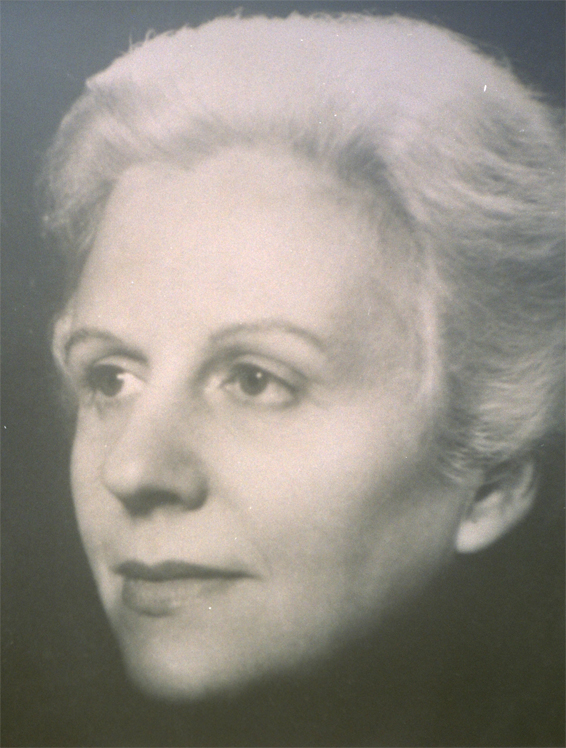
Mercè Rodoreda

- Ramon Llull (c. 1232–c. 1315), philosopher, theologist, mystic, missionary, narrator, poet, logician and professor
- Ramon Muntaner (c. 1270–1336), soldier and writer of the 14th century
- Joanot Martorell (c. 1410–1465), knight and writer of the 15th century
- Jaime Balmes (1810–1848), priest, philosopher and political writer
- Àngel Guimerà, (1845–1924), writer
- Jacint Verdaguer (1845–1902), poet
- Narcís Oller (1846–1930), writer
- Joan Maragall (1860–1911), writer and poet
- Josep Carner (1884–1970), poet
- Gaziel (1887–1964), journalist, writer and publisher
- Carles Riba (1893–1959), poet
- Josep Vicenç Foix (1893–1987), poet, essayist and writer
- Josep Pla (1897–1981), writer
- Joan Oliver i Sallarès (1899–1986), pseudonym Pere Quart, poet, playwright, translator, narrator, and journalist

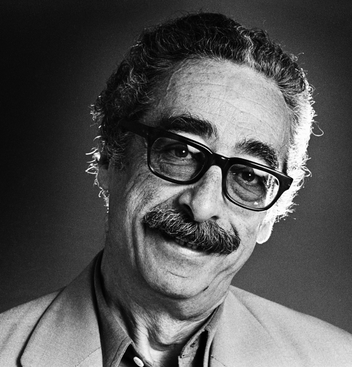
Manuel de Pedrolo

- Mercè Rodoreda (1908–1983), writer, known for novel The Time of the Doves (1962)
- Miquel Martí i Pol (1929–2003), writer and poet
- Pere Calders (1912–1994), writer
- Josep Ferrater i Mora (1912–1991), philosopher, essayist and writer
- Joan Sales (1912–1983), writer, poet, translator and editor
- Salvador Espriu (1913–1985), writer and poet
- Joan Vinyoli (1914–1984), poet
- Manuel de Pedrolo (1918–1990), writer

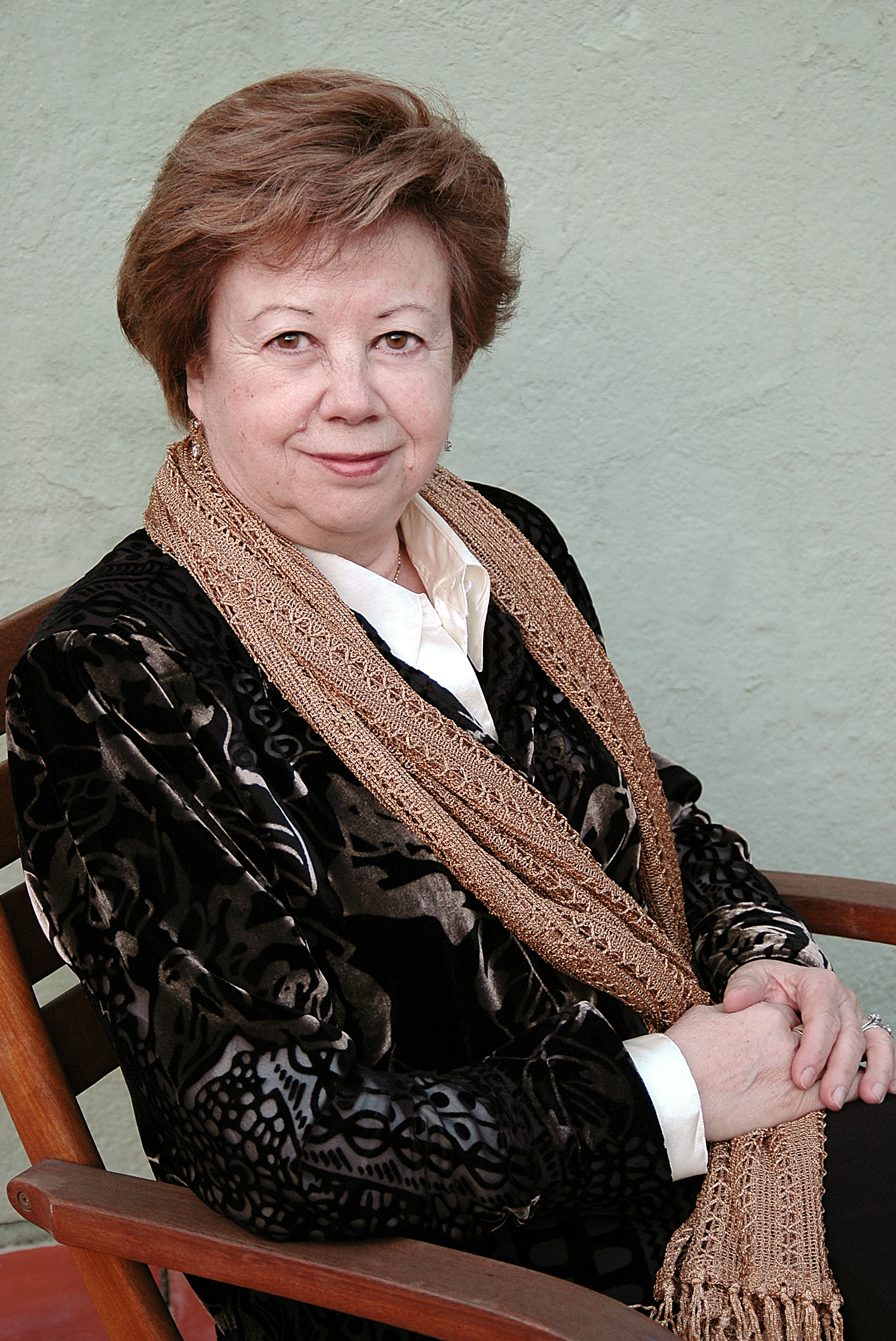
Olga Xirinacs Díaz

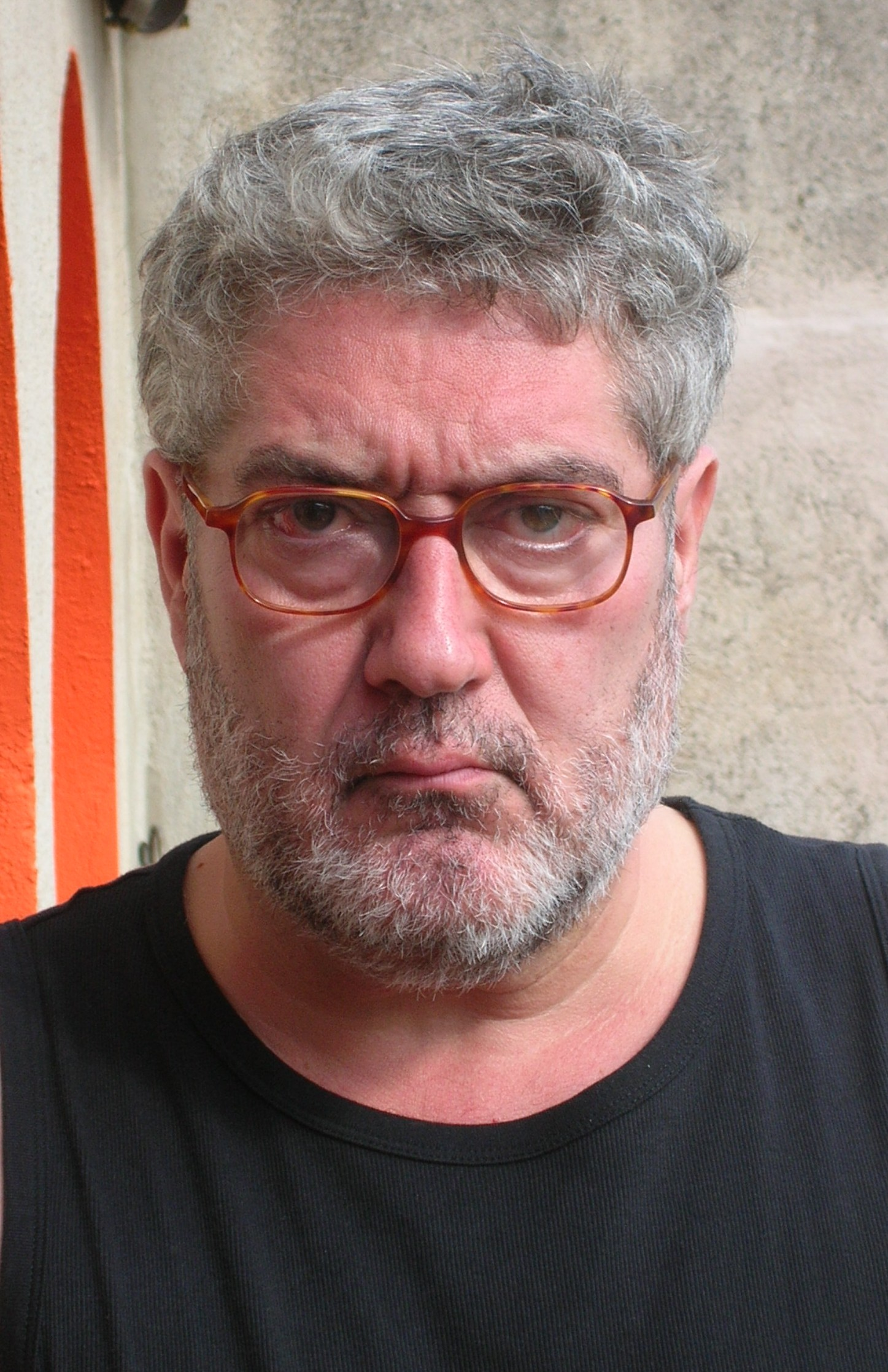
Quim Monzó

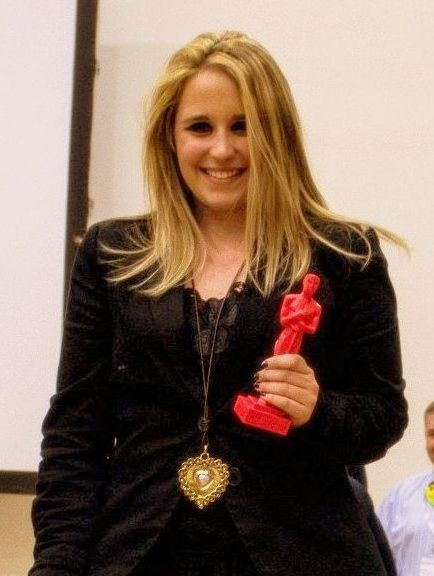
Carla Herrero

- Montserrat Abelló i Soler (1918–2014), poet and translator
- Joan Brossa (1919–1998), poet, playwright, plastic artist and graphic designer
- Gabriel Ferrater (1922–1972), poet, translator and scholar of linguistics
- Maria Àngels Anglada (1930–1999), poet and novelist
- Quima Jaume i Carbo (1934–1993), poet
- Olga Xirinacs Díaz (born 1936), writer and pianist
- Lluís Solà i Sala (born 1940), poet, playwright and translator
- Montserrat Roig (1946–1991), writer, journalist, feminist
- Quim Monzó, writer
- Maria Mercè Marçal (1952–1998), poet, writer and translator
- Sergi Pàmies (born 1960), writer, translator, journalist
- Joan Carreras i Goicoechea (born 1962), journalist, screenwriter and writer
- Anna Dodas i Noguer (1962–1986), poet
- Màrius Serra (born 1963), writer, journalist, translator
- Albert Sánchez Piñol (born 1968), writer, novelist and author of the international best-seller Victus: Barcelona 1714
- Carla Herrero (born 1994), writer, blogger

== Military ==
- Abu-l-Hasan Ali ibn Ruburtayr (? – 1187), Muslim Catalan mercenary commander
- Nunó Sanç I (c. 1185–1241), Catalan nobleman and military leader
- Berenguer de Palou II (died 1241), bishop of Barcelona and led different crusades
- Ramon Muntaner (1270–1336), commander and chronicler of the Catalan Company
- Francesc de Tamarit i de Rifà (1600–1653), military leader during the Battle of Montjuïc (1641)
- Rafael Casanova i Comes (1660–1743), Coronela leader during the Siege of Barcelona (1713–14)
- Josep Moragues i Mas (1669–1715), Catalan general during the War of Spanish Succession
- Manuel d'Amat i de Junyent (1707– 1782), military officer and colonial administrator
- Gaspar de Portolà (1716–1786), Spanish officer and explorer, first Governor of the Californias
- Pere Fages i Beleta (1734–1794), Spanish explorer, fifth Governor of the Californias
- Francisco Milans del Bosch (1769–1834), Spanish general.
- Llarg de Copons (1800–1839), Carlist warlord
- Ramón Cabrera y Griñó (1806–1877), Carlist general from Tortosa
- Joan Prim i Prats (1814 – 30 December 1870), Spanish general and statesman
- Josep Masgoret i Marcó (1820–1883), Carlist warlord
- Joseph Joffre (1852–1931), French general, born in Ribesaltes (Roussillon)
- Domènec Batet (1872–1937), Spanish Army general
- Ramon Vila Capdevila (1908–1963), anarchist and guerilla fighter
- Ramon Mercader (1913–1978), soviet spy, murderer of Leon Trotsky
- Sabaté brothers (fl. 1940s), three Maquis guerrillas of the Francoist post-Civil War period

== Musicians and Singers ==
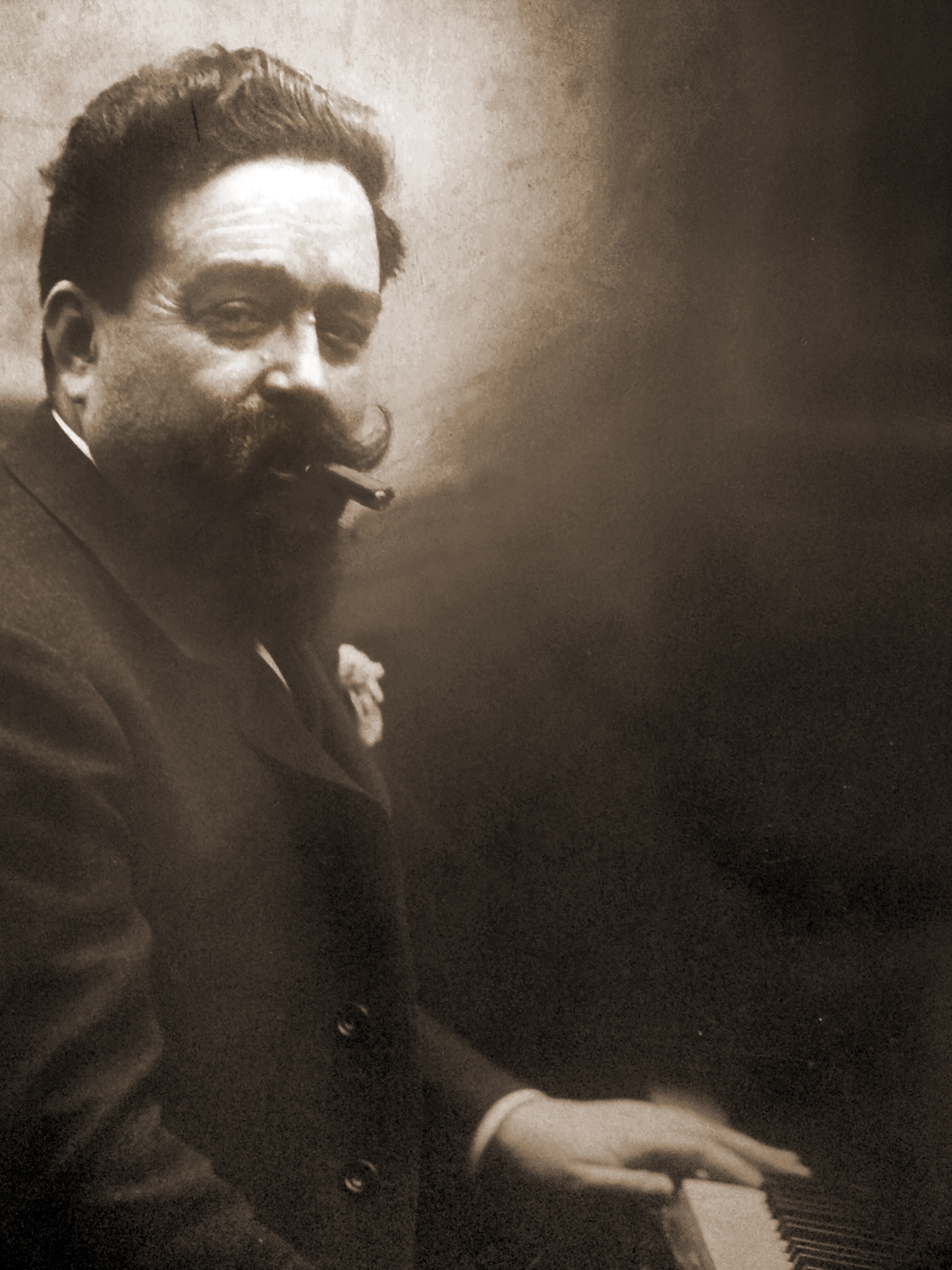
Isaac Albéniz

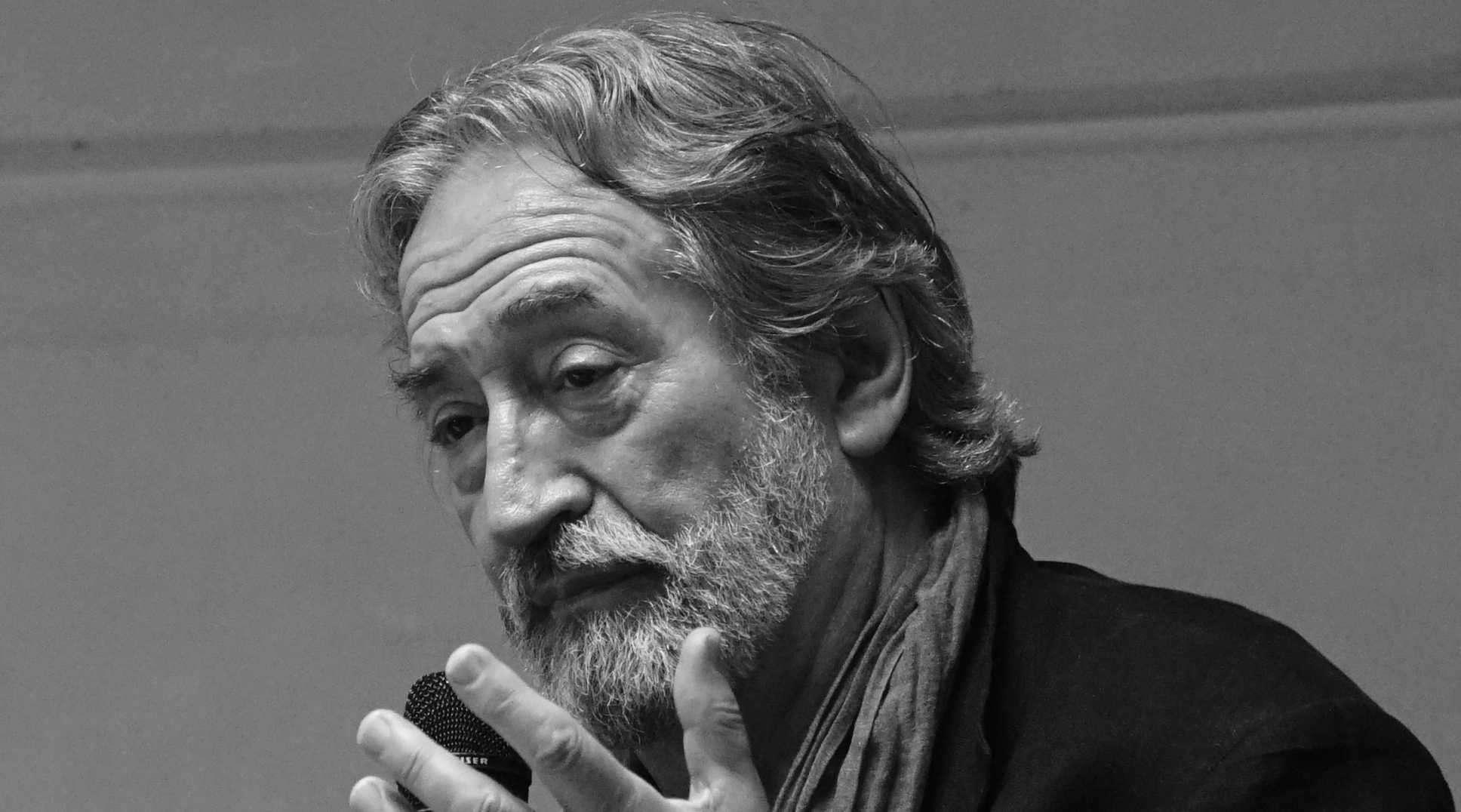
Jordi Savall

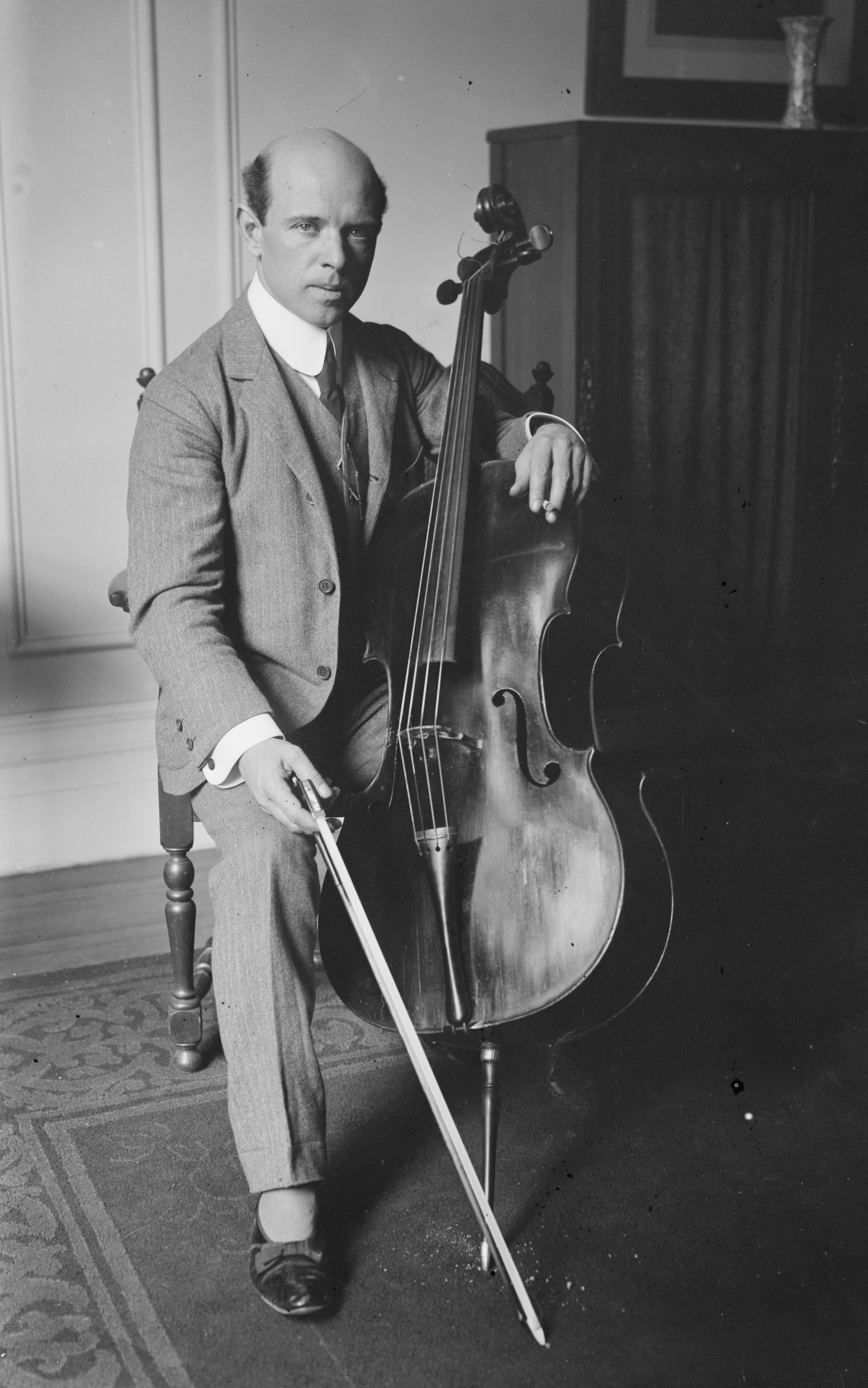
Pau Casals

- Guerau de Cabrera (1160–1161), troubadour
- Jofre de Foixà (died 1300), troubadour, Benedictine and abbot of San Giovanni degli Eremiti in Palermo
- Ferran Sor (1778–1839), composer
- Josep Maria Moliné (1819–1883), composer
- Felip Pedrell (1841–1922), composer, guitarist and musicologist
- Isaac Albéniz (1860–1909), pianist and composer
- Enric Morera i Viura (1865–1942), musician and composer
- Enric Granados (1867–1916), musician
- Pau Casals (1876–1973), cellist
- Miguel Llobet (1878–1938), composer and guitarist
- Maria Gay (1879–1943), mezzo-soprano
- Enric Roig i Masriera (1892–1962), violinist, poet and musicologist
- Frederic Mompou (1893–1987), composer
- Conchita Supervía (1895–1936), soprano
- Robert Gerhard (1896–1970), composer
- Xavier Cugat (1900–1990), musician
- Joan Magrané Figuera, composer
- Xavier Montsalvatge (1912–2002), composer and music critic
- Victòria dels Àngels (1923–2005), soprano
- Alicia de Larrocha (1923–2009), pianist
- Tete Montoliu (1933–1997), jazz pianist

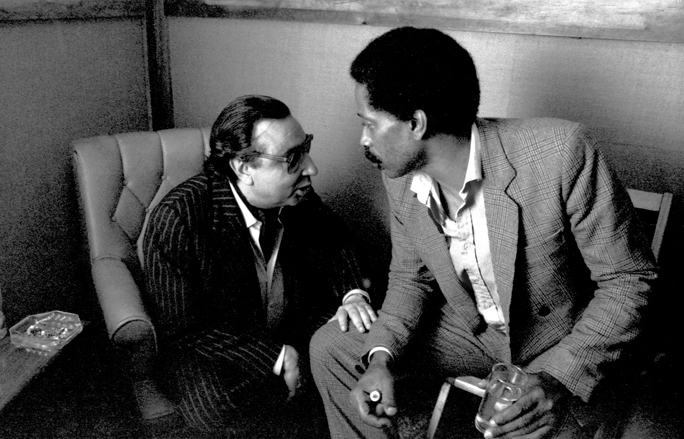
Tete Montoliu

- Montserrat Caballé (1933–2018), soprano
- Jaume Aragall (born 1939), tenor
- Laura Almerich (1940–2019), classical guitarist
- Jordi Savall (born 1941), musician
- Núria Feliu (1941-2022), singer and actress
- Joan Manuel Serrat (born 1943), singer and author
- Josep Carreras (born 1946), tenor
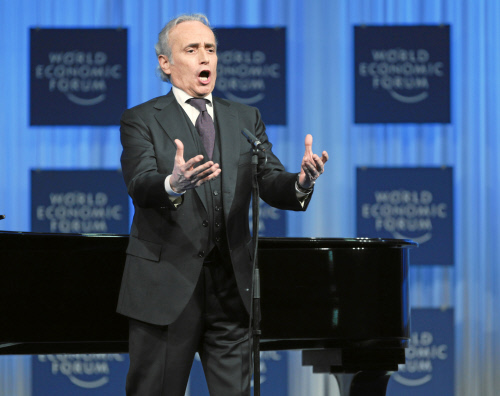
  Josep Carreras
- Lluís Llach (born 1948), singer and composer
- Pau Riba (born 1948), singer and composer
- Jaume Sisa (born 1948), singer-songwriter
- Pascal Comelade (born 1955), musician
- Carles Sabater (born 1962), singer and actor
- Joan Chamorro (born 1962), jazz musician, teacher, big band leader
- Adrià Puntí (born 1963), musician and singer-songwriter
- Sergio Dalma (born 1964), singer
- Gerard Quintana (born 1964), singer
- Damaris Gelabert (born 1965), singer
- Mónica Naranjo (born 1974), singer
- Guillermo Scott Herren (born 1976), producer
- Montse Cortés (born 1972), flamenco singer
- Beth (born 1981), singer
- Sílvia Pérez Cruz (born 1983), singer, musician
- Álvaro Soler (born 1991), singer-songwriter
- Rosalía (born 1992), singer-songwriter, musician
- Andrea Motis (born 1995), jazz musician, singer
- Bad Gyal (born 1997), singer-songwriter, musician
- Aitana (born 1999), singer

== Fashion ==
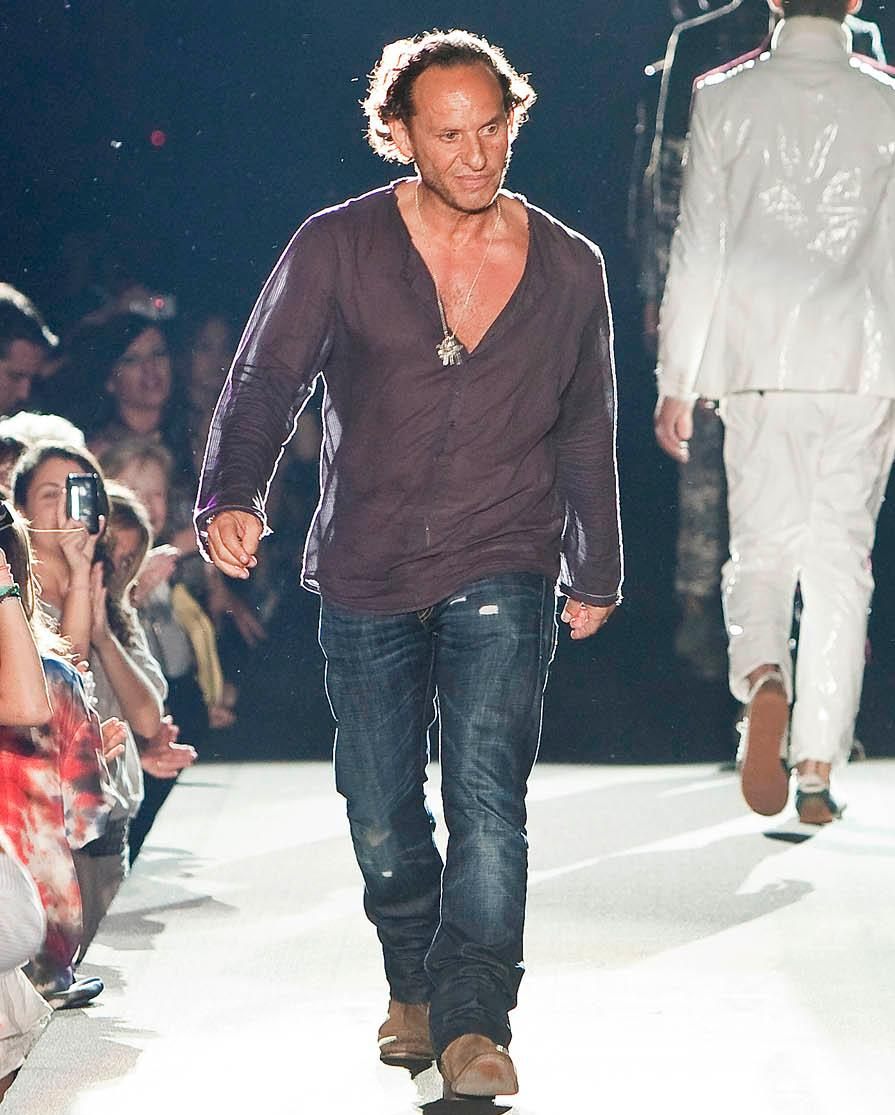
Custo Dalmau

=== Fashion Designers ===
- Custo Dalmau (born 1959), fashion designer, founder of Custo Barcelona

=== Fashion Models ===
- Judit Mascó (born 1969)
- Vanessa Lorenzo (born 1977)
- Andrés Segura (born 1978)
- Oriol Elcacho (born 1979)
- Mireia Lalaguna (born 1992), Miss World 2015 winner
- Andres Velencoso (born 1978)

== Politicians and Leaders ==
=== Before the 19th Century ===
- Belló I of Carcassonne (755–810), founder of the Bellonid Dynasty known as the cradle of the Catalan lords and people
- Wilfred I the Hairy (died 897), 12th count of Barcelona, founder of the House of Barcelona
- Jaume I the Conqueror (1208–1276), 8th king of Aragon and 26th count of Barcelona
- Pere III the Great (1239–1285), 9th king of Aragon and 27th count of Barcelona
- Martí I the Humane (1356–1410), 15th king of Aragon and last monarch of the House of Barcelona
- Martí I the Younger (1374/1376–1409), king of Sicily dead at 32–35 in Cagliari
- Bernat d'Oms i Santa Pau (????–1474), governor of Elna, killed and beheaded by the troops of Louis XI
- Pau Claris i Casademunt (1586–1641), lawyer, 94th President of the Generalitat de Catalunya and leader at the Catalan Revolt (1635-1659)
- Rafael Casanova i Comes (1660–1743), lawyer and Conseller en Cap of the Consell de Cent of Barcelona
- Josep Moragues i Mas (1669–1715), Catalan patriot, led the insurgence against the Bourbonic troops after the War of the Spanish Succession until he was executed, decapitated, butchered and his head placed for 12 years hanging in the main entrance to Barcelona
- Gaspar de Portolà i Rovira (1716–1784), soldier, governor of Baja California and Alta California, explorer and founder of San Diego and Monterey
- Pere Fages i Beleta (1734–1794), soldier, explorer; second Spanish military Governor of New California, 1770–1774; Governor of the Californias, 1782-1791

=== Modern Politicians ===
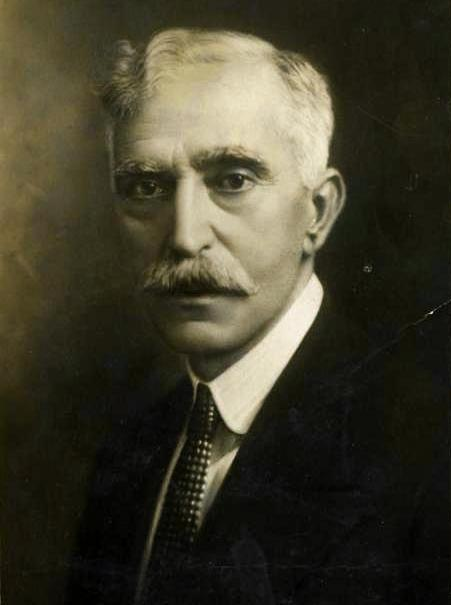
Francesc Macià

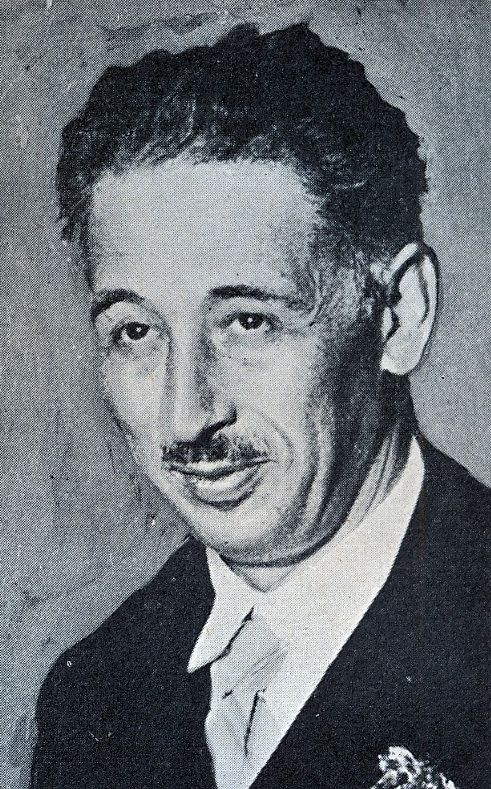
Lluís Companys

- Joan Prim i Prats (1814–1870), general and statesman, Captain-General of Puerto Rico, commander of the Spanish Army in Mexico and in Morocco, and president of the Spanish Council
- Estanislao Figueras (1819–1882), first president of the First Spanish Republic
- Francesc Pi i Margall (1824–1901), second president of the First Spanish Republic
- Valentí Almirall (1841–1904), politician, author of Lo catalanisme, founder of the first daily periodical in the Catalan language, El diari català
- Francesc Macià, (1859–1933), soldier, politician and 122nd President of the Generalitat de Catalunya
- Josep Irla (1874–1958), politician, 124th President of the Generalitat de Catalunya
- Francesc Cambó (1876–1947), politician
- Enric Prat de la Riba (1879–1917), politician
- Lluís Companys (1882–1940), politician, 123rd President of the Generalitat de Catalunya
- Andreu Nin (1892–1937), heterodox communist politician
- Federica Montseny (1905–1994), anarchist politician
- José Figueres Ferrer (1906–1990), politician, President of Costa Rica in three occasions
- Jordi Pujol (born 1930), politician, 126th President of the Generalitat de Catalunya
- Pasqual Maragall (born 1941), politician, 127th President of the Generalitat de Catalunya
- Jaime Nebot (born 1946), politician, current mayor of Guayaquil, Ecuador
- Josep Borrell (born 1947), former President of the European Parliament
- Artur Mas (born 1956), politician and 129th President of the Generalitat de Catalunya
- Carles Puigdemont i Casamajó, politician, 130th President of the Generalitat de Catalunya
- Roger Albinyana i Saigí, Liberal politician
- Salvador Illa, former Minister of Health of Spain, current Secretary for Organization of the Socialists' Party of Catalonia
- Meritxell Batet, currently serving as President of the Congress of Deputies
- Jaume Collboni, Deputy Mayor of Barcelona
- Manuel Valls (born 1962), former French Prime Minister
- Daniel Sirera (born 1967), chairman of the People's Party
- Amadeu Altafaj (born 1968), journalist and present European Commission Vice President spokesman
- Gabriel Boric (born 1986), President of Chile

== Sportspeople ==
=== Alpinism, Trail Running and Ski ===
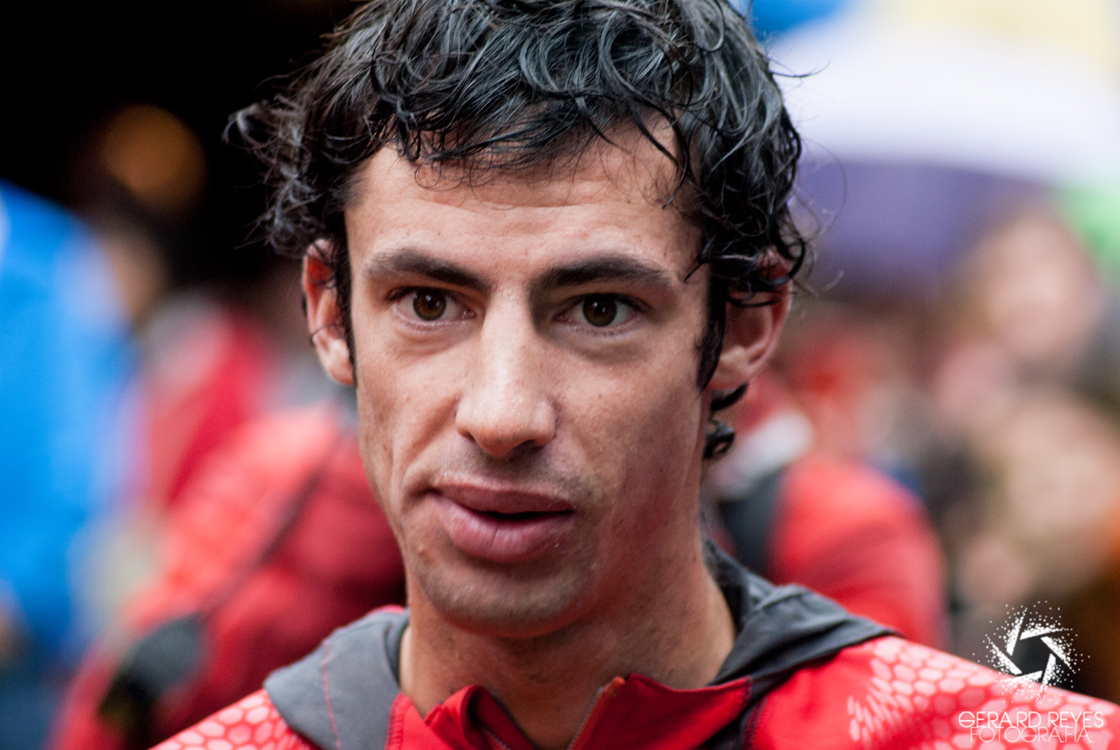
Kílian Jornet Burgada

- Núria Picas (born 1976), sky runner and trail runner
- Kílian Jornet Burgada (born 1987), long-distance runner and ski mountaineer
- Jordi Font (born 1975), snowboarder
- Laura Orgué (born 1986), cross country skier

=== Athletics ===
- Reyes Estévez (born 1976), former 1500m runner
- Javier García (born 1966), former Pole Vaulter, Olympic bronze medallist
- Natalia Rodríguez (born 1979), 1500m runner

=== Basketball ===
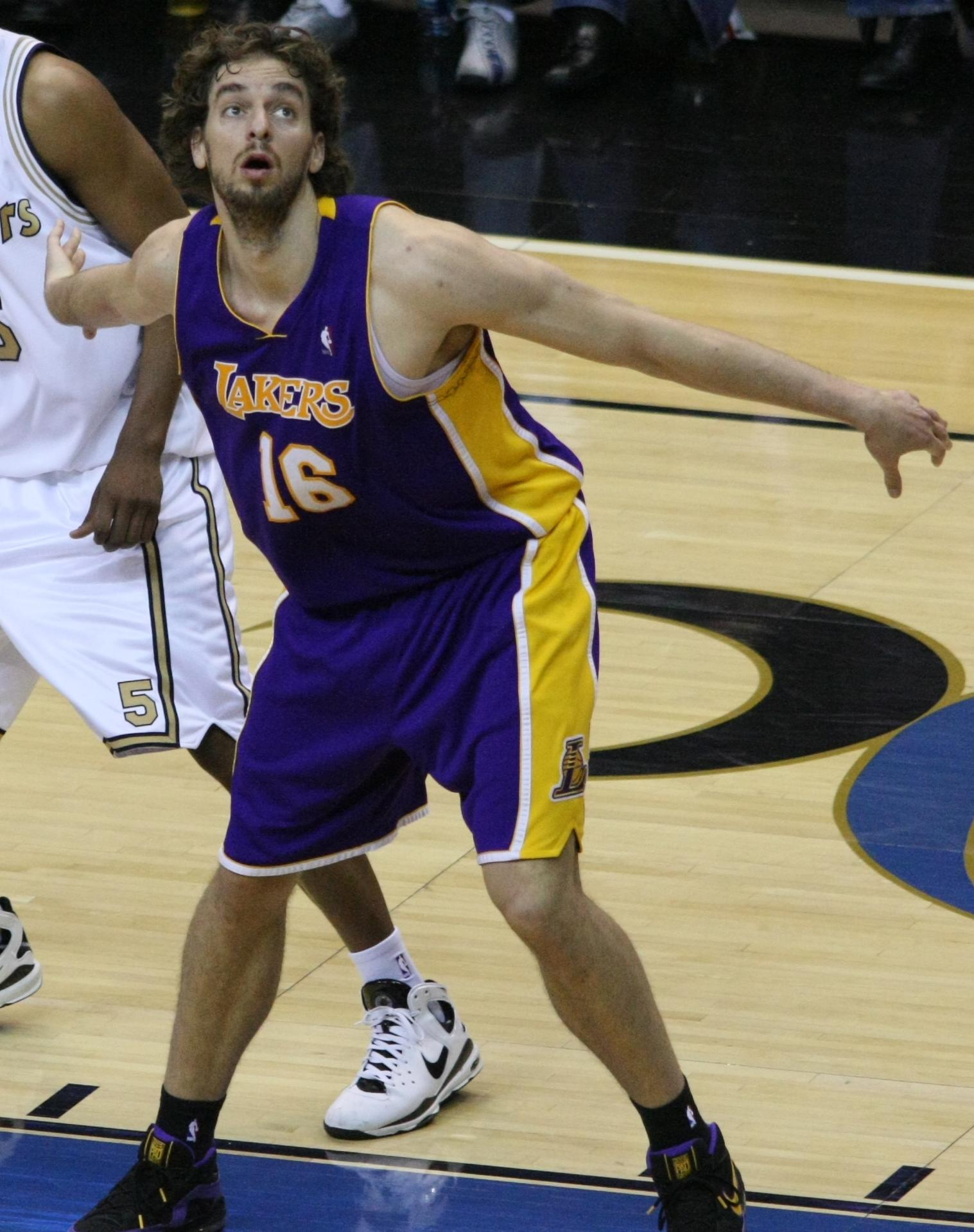
Pau Gasol

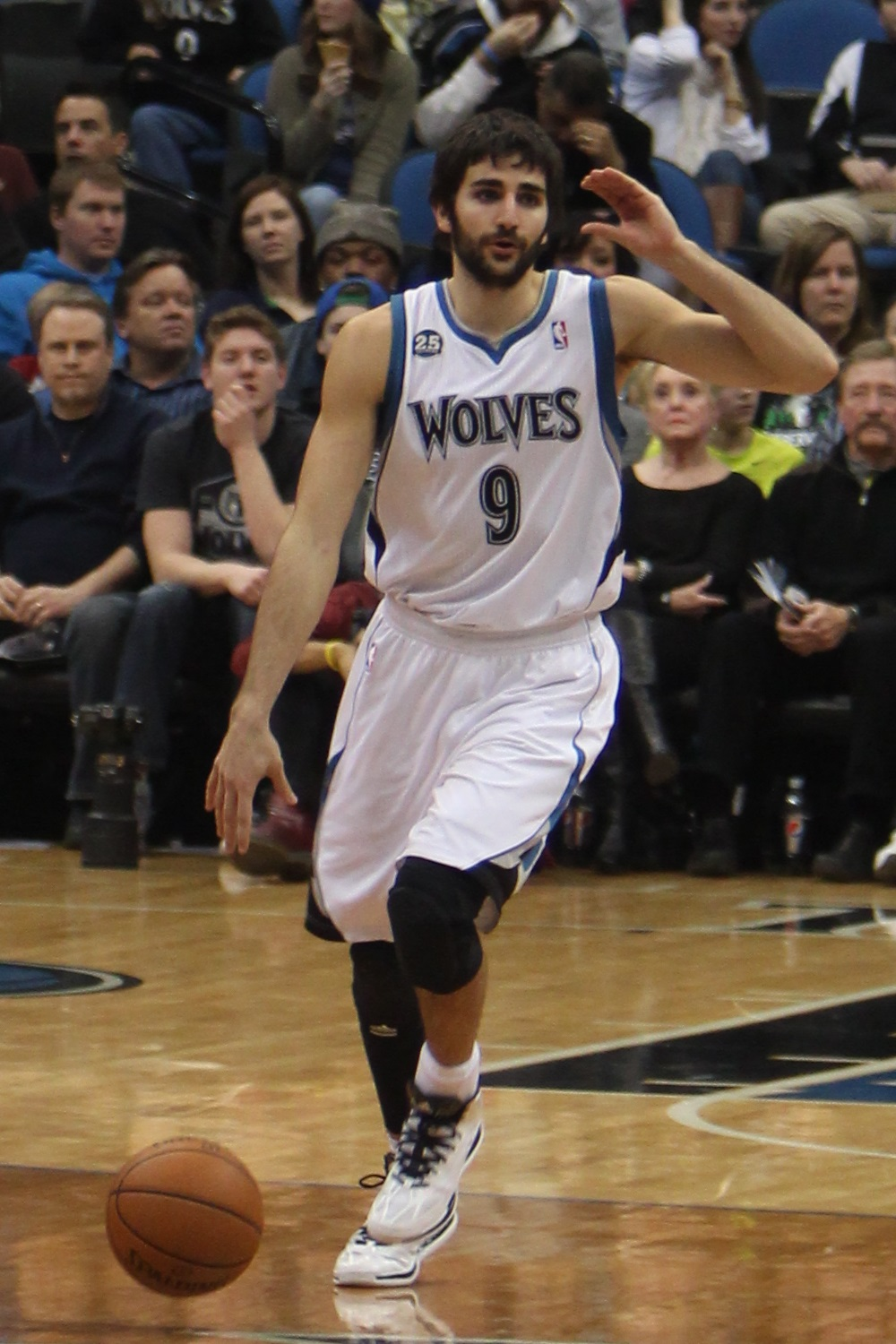
Ricky Rubio

- Ignacio "Nacho" Solozabal (born 1958), former player for Barça
- Jordi Villacampa (born 1963), former player and president from Joventut Badalona
- Rafael Jofresa (born 1966), former player from Joventut Badalona, Barça and CB Girona
- Roger Grimau (born 1978), former player from Joventut Badalona
- Pau Gasol (born 1980), ACB basketball player, formerly for Barça and currently in the NBA for the San Antonio Spurs
- Raúl López (born 1980), formerly for Joventut Badalona, NBA basketball player for Utah Jazz
- Juan Carlos Navarro (born 1980), NBA basketball player for Memphis Grizzlies and ACB for Barça
- Marc Gasol (born 1985), ACB basketball player for Barça and CB Girona and NBA for the Memphis Grizzlies; younger brother of Pau Gasol
- Pau Ribas (born 1987), former player from Joventut Badalona, currently as playmaker for Barça
- Ricky Rubio (born 1990), former player from Joventut Badalona; now with the Utah Jazz in the NBA
- Pierre Oriola (born 1992), Spanish National Team Player currently playing for Barça
- Álex Mumbrú (born 1979), former Real Madrid and Spanish National Team Player, current captain of Bilbao Basket
- Xavi Pascual (born 1972), former Barça coach, winner of 2010 Euroleague and current coach of Panathinaikos

=== Cycling ===
- David de la Cruz (born 1989), active
- Melcior Mauri (born 1966), Vuelta a España winner (1991)
- Maribel Moreno (born 1981)
- José Pesarrodona (born 1946), Vuelta a España winner (1976)
- Miguel Poblet (1928–2013)
- Joaquim Rodríguez (born 1979)
- Marc Soler (born 1993), active

=== Football ===
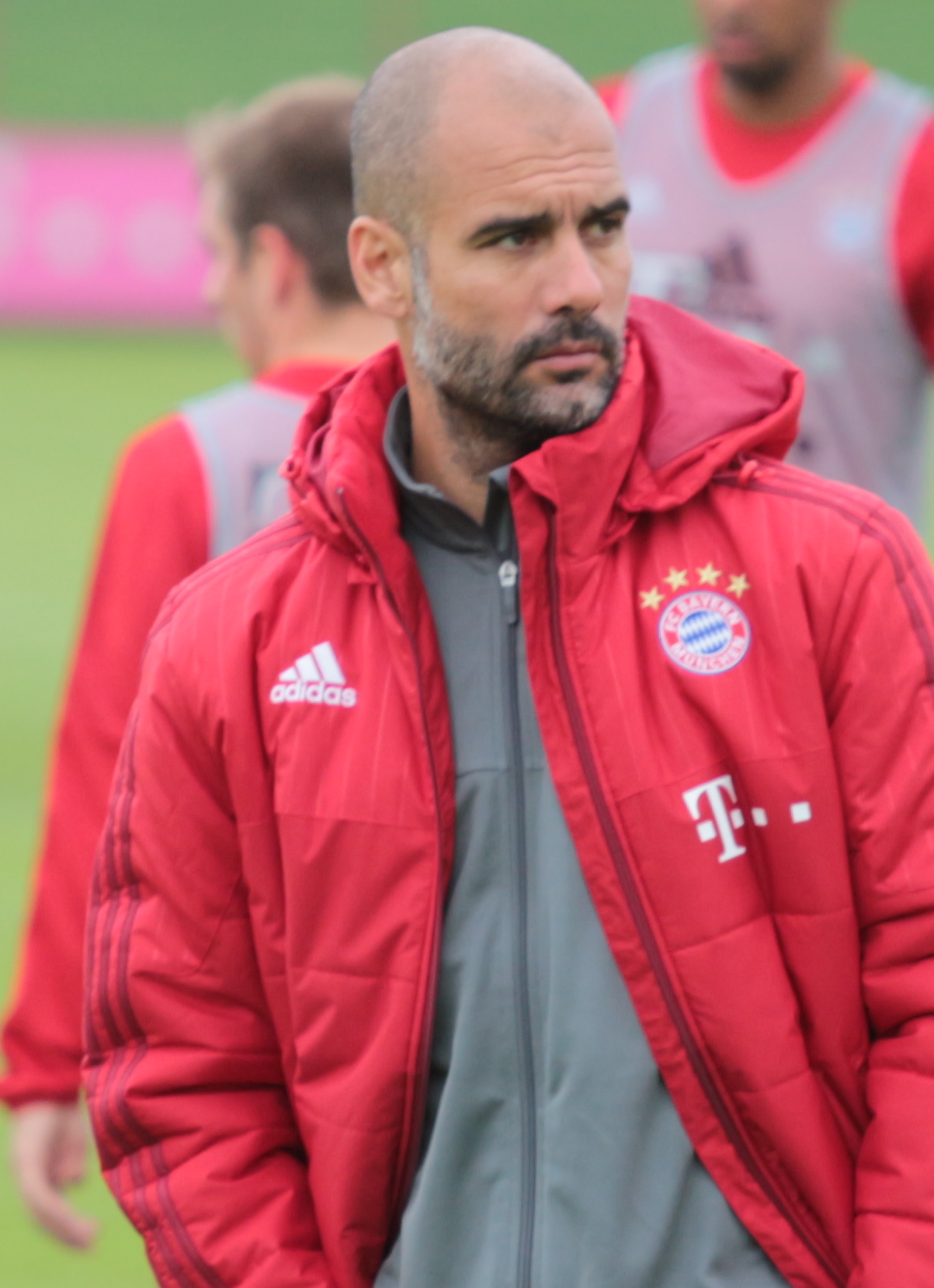
Pep Guardiola

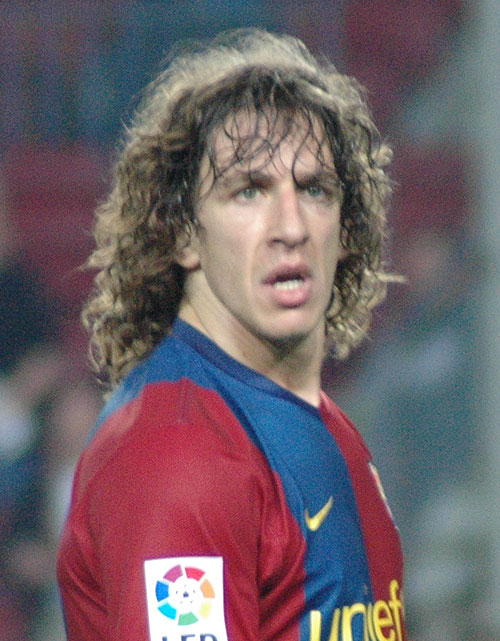
Carles Puyol

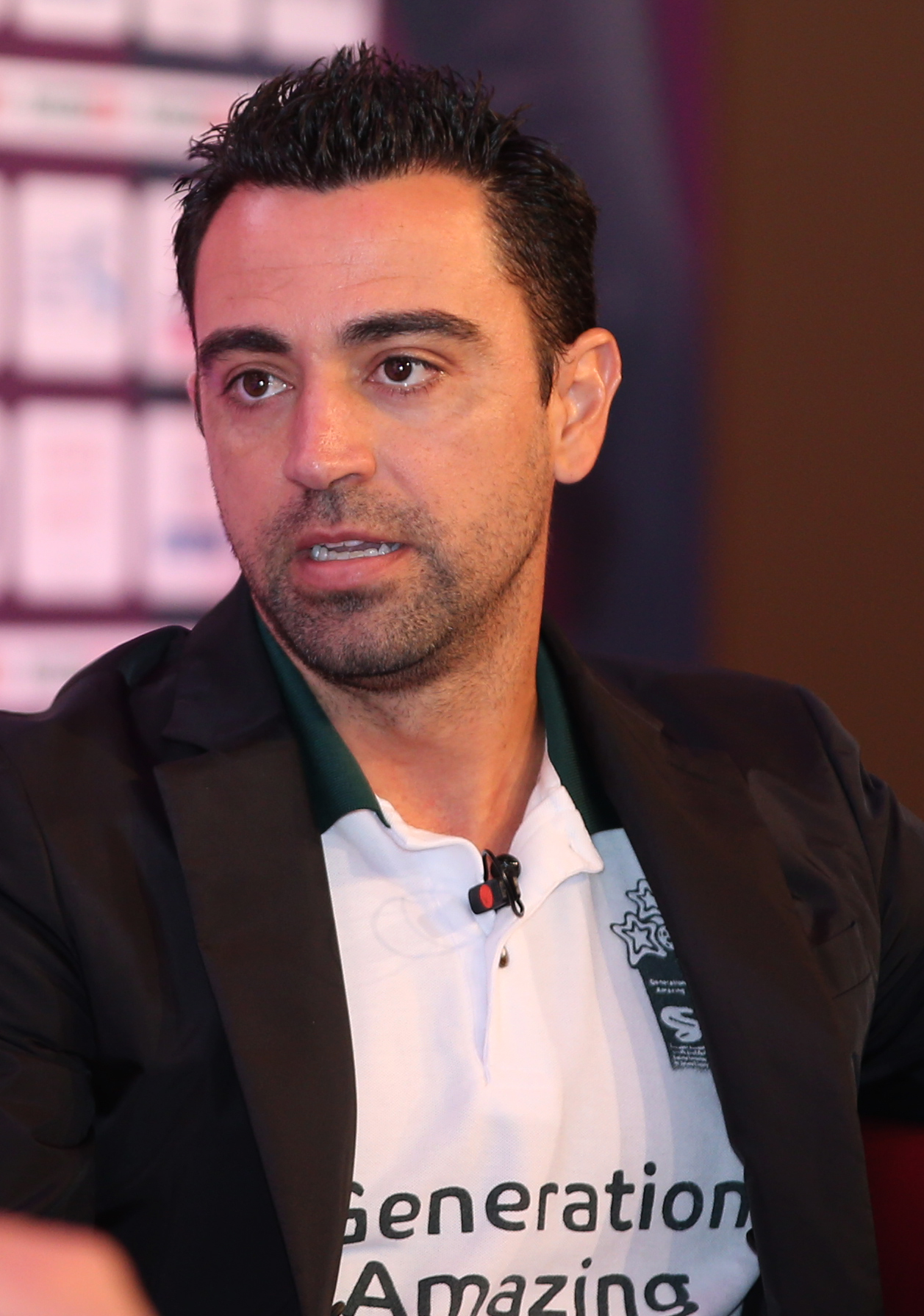
Xavi Hernández

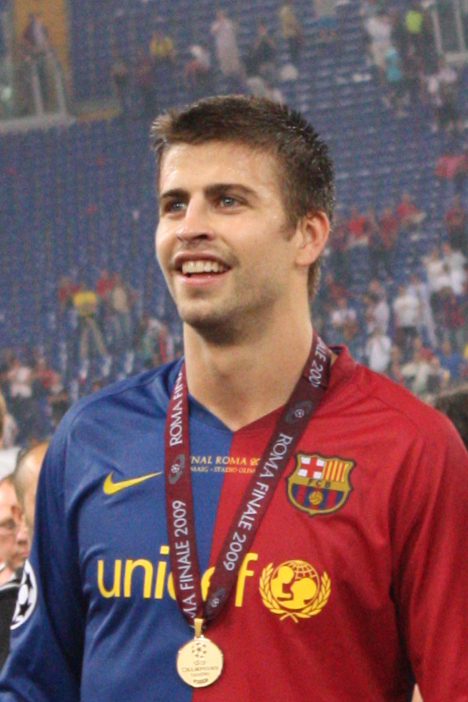
Gerard Piqué

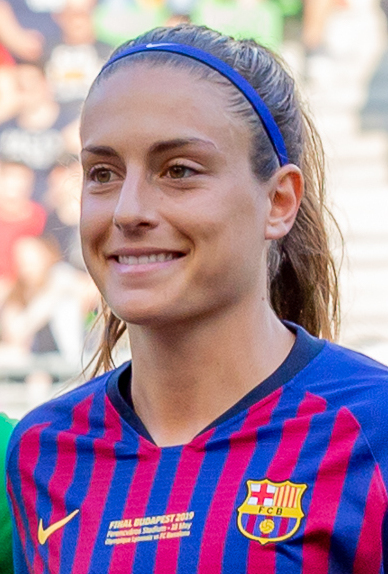
Alexia Putellas

- Jordi Alba (born 1989), Spanish international, 2012 European Championship winner
- Marc Bartra (born 1991), Spanish international
- Estanislau Basora (1926–2012), former Spanish international
- Sergio Busquets (born 1988), Spanish international, 2010 World Cup winner & 2012 European Championship winner
- Joan Capdevila (born 1978), former Spanish international, 2010 World Cup winner & 2008 European Championship winner
- Gerard Deulofeu (born 1994), Spanish international
- Cesc Fàbregas (born 1987), Spanish international, 2010 World Cup winner, 2008 & 2012 European Championship winner
- Andreu Fontàs (born 1989), Spanish international
- Sergio García (born 1983), Spanish international, 2008 European Championship winner
- Pep Guardiola (born 1971), former Spanish international, former manager of Barcelona and Bayern Munich and currently of Manchester City
- Roberto Martínez (born 1973), former manager of Everton and currently of Belgium
- Fernando Navarro (born 1982), former Spanish international, 2008 European Championship winner
- Gerard Piqué (born 1987), Spanish international, 2010 World Cup winner & 2012 European Championship winner
- Carles Puyol (born 1978), former Spanish international, 2010 World Cup winner & 2008 European Championship winner
- Antoni Ramallets (1924–2013), former Spanish international
- Carles Rexach (born 1947), former Spanish international, former manager of Barcelona
- Sergi Roberto (born 1992), Spanish international
- Josep Samitier (1902–1972), former Spanish international
- Raúl Tamudo (born 1977), former Spanish international
- Víctor Valdés (born 1982), former Spanish international, 2010 World Cup winner & 2012 European Championship winner
- Tito Vilanova (1969–2014), former manager of Barcelona
- Xavi Hernández (born 1980), former Spanish international, 2010 World Cup winner, 2008 & 2012 European Championship winner
- Ricardo Zamora (1901–1978), former Spanish international
- Michał Żuk (born 2009), Polish footballer, born in Catalonia
- Sercan Sararer
- Alexia Putellas (born 1994), two time Ballon d'or winner and Barcelona captain
- Aitana Bonmatí (born 1998), Spanish international, multiple Ballon d'Or winner; 2023 Women's World Cup winner

=== Motor Racing ===
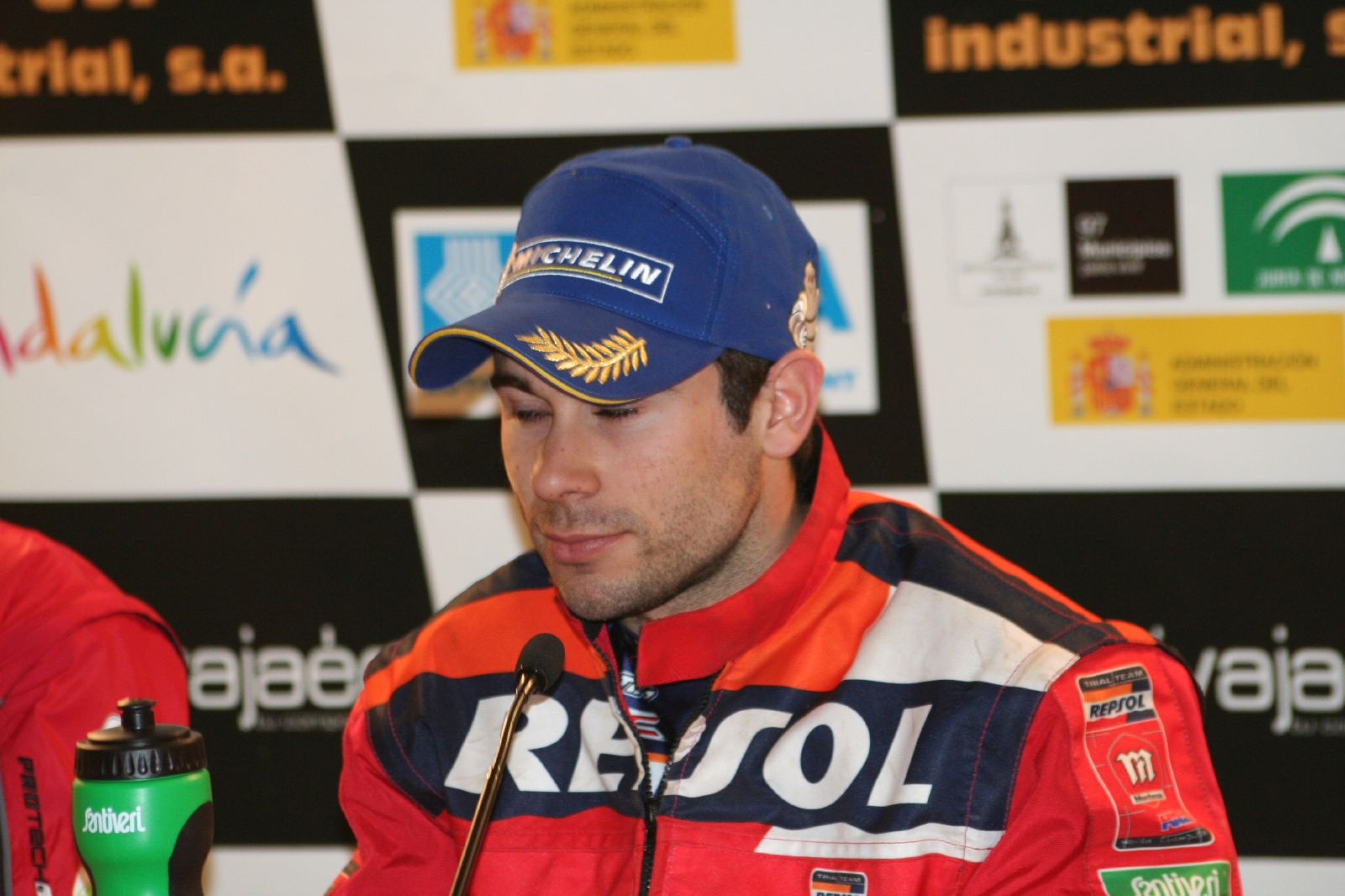
Toni Bou

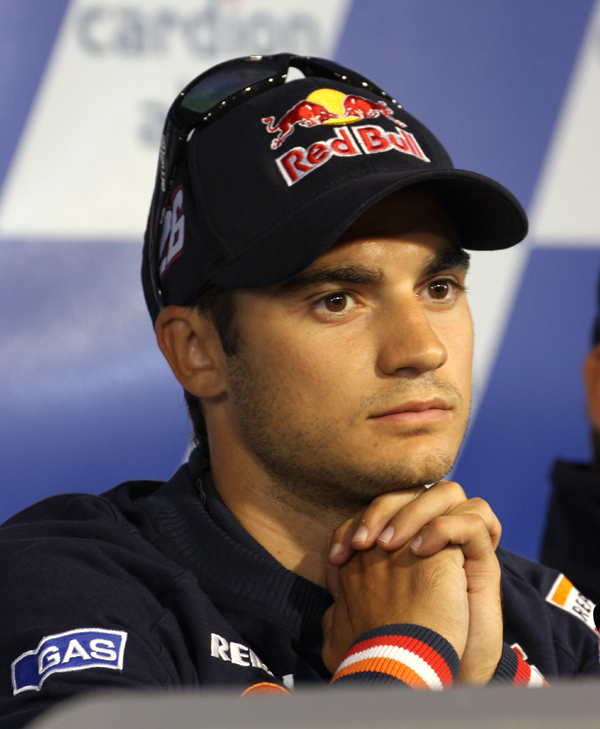
Dani Pedrosa

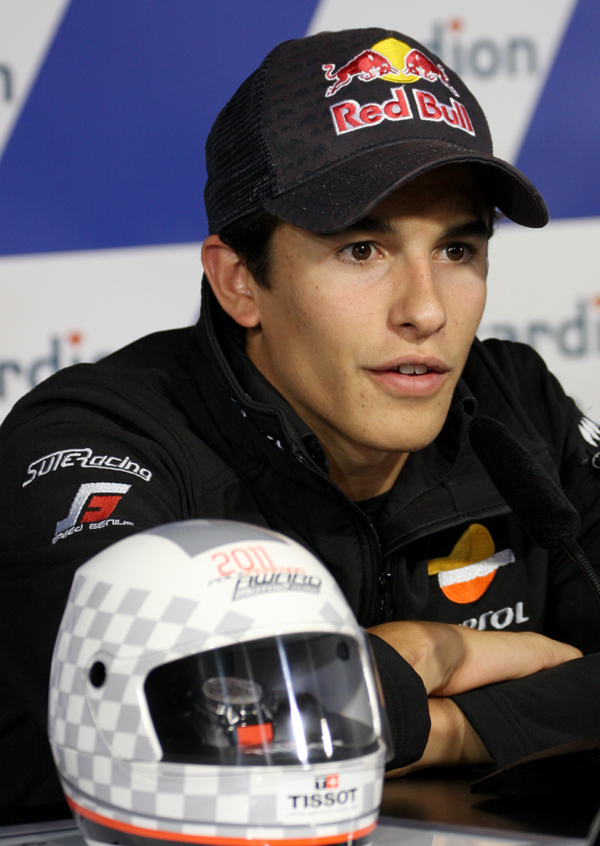
Marc Márquez

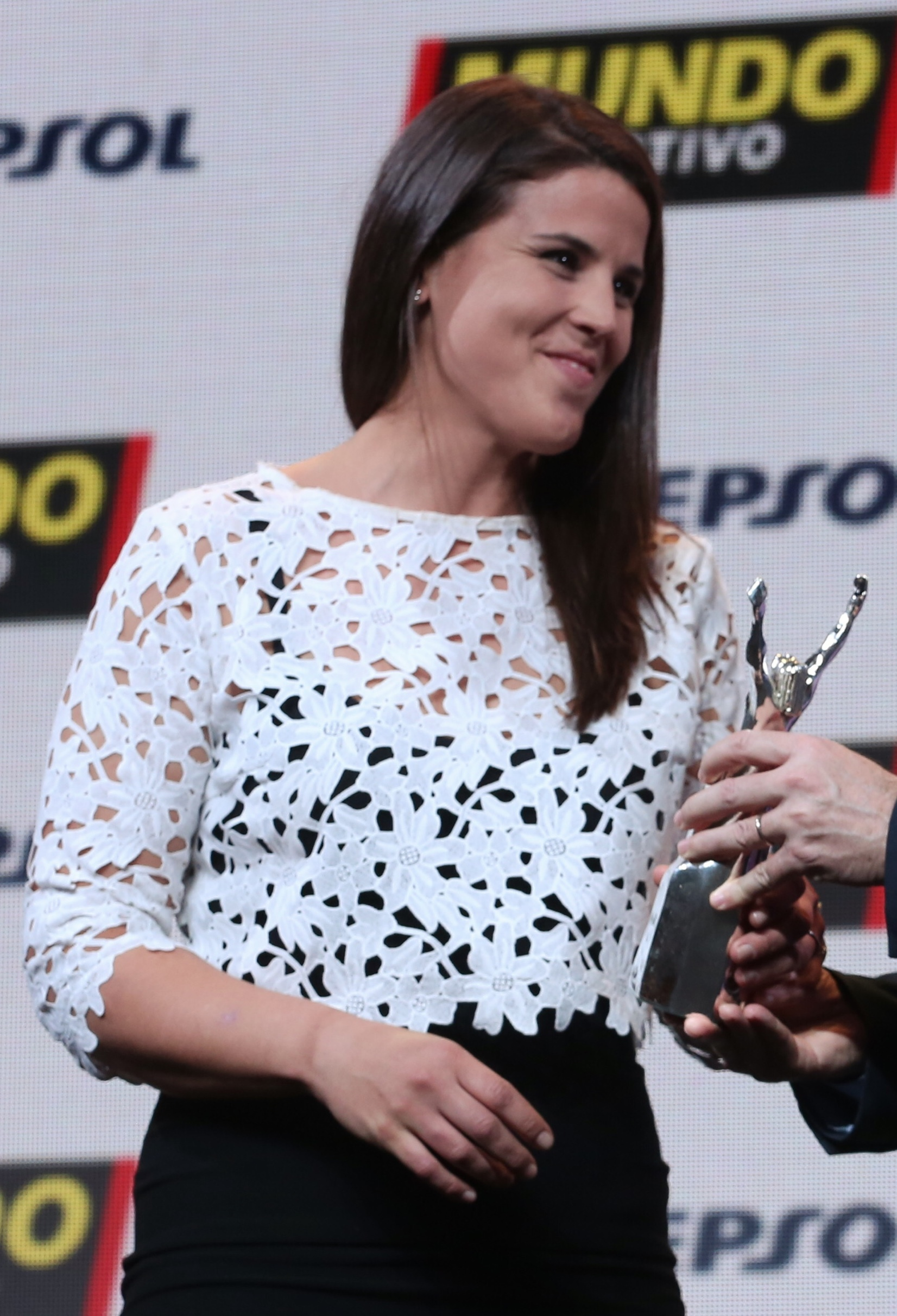
Laia Sanz

- Alfonso "Sito" Pons (born 1959), former world champion GP motorcycle racer, owner of MotoGP race team
- Jordi Tarrés (born 1966), motorcycle trial rider, 7 times World Champion
- Àlex Crivillé (born 1970), former GP motorcycle racer, 1999 500cc GP World Champion
- Pedro Martínez de la Rosa (born 1971), former F1 driver
- Nani Roma (born 1972), rally racing motorcycle rider and rally raid driver, winner of 2004 and 2014 Dakar Rally
- Sete Gibernau (born 1972), former GP motorcycle racer
- Emilio Alzamora (born 1973), former motorcycle racer, 1999 125cc GP World Champion
- Marc Gené (born 1974), former F1 driver
- Oriol Servià (born 1974), former ChampCar, IndyCar, and Formula E driver, 1999 Indy Lights champion
- Marc Coma (born 1976), rally raid motorcycle racer, winner of 2006, 2009, 2011 and 2014 Dakar Rally
- Adam Raga (born 1982), motorcycle trial rider, Outdoor Trial World Champion 2005, 2006; Indoor Trial World Champion 2003, 2004, 2005 and 2006
- Toni Elías (born 1983), first world champion of "Moto2"
- Laia Sanz (born 1985), motorcycle trial rider and rally raid motorcycle racer; 13 times Women's Outdoor Trial World Champion; winner of the 2011 and 2012 Dakar Rally in the female class
- Dani Pedrosa (born 1985), GP motorcycle racer, 125 and 250cc world champion
- Toni Bou (born 1986), motorcycle trial rider; 8 time Indoor Trial World Champion; 7 time Outdoor Trial World Champion
- Jaime Alguersuari (born 1990), former F1 driver
- Marc Márquez (born 1993), motorcycle racer; 2010 125cc GP World Champion; 2012 Moto2 World Champion; 2013, 2014, 2016, 2017, 2018, 2019 and 2025 MotoGP World Champion

=== Swimming ===
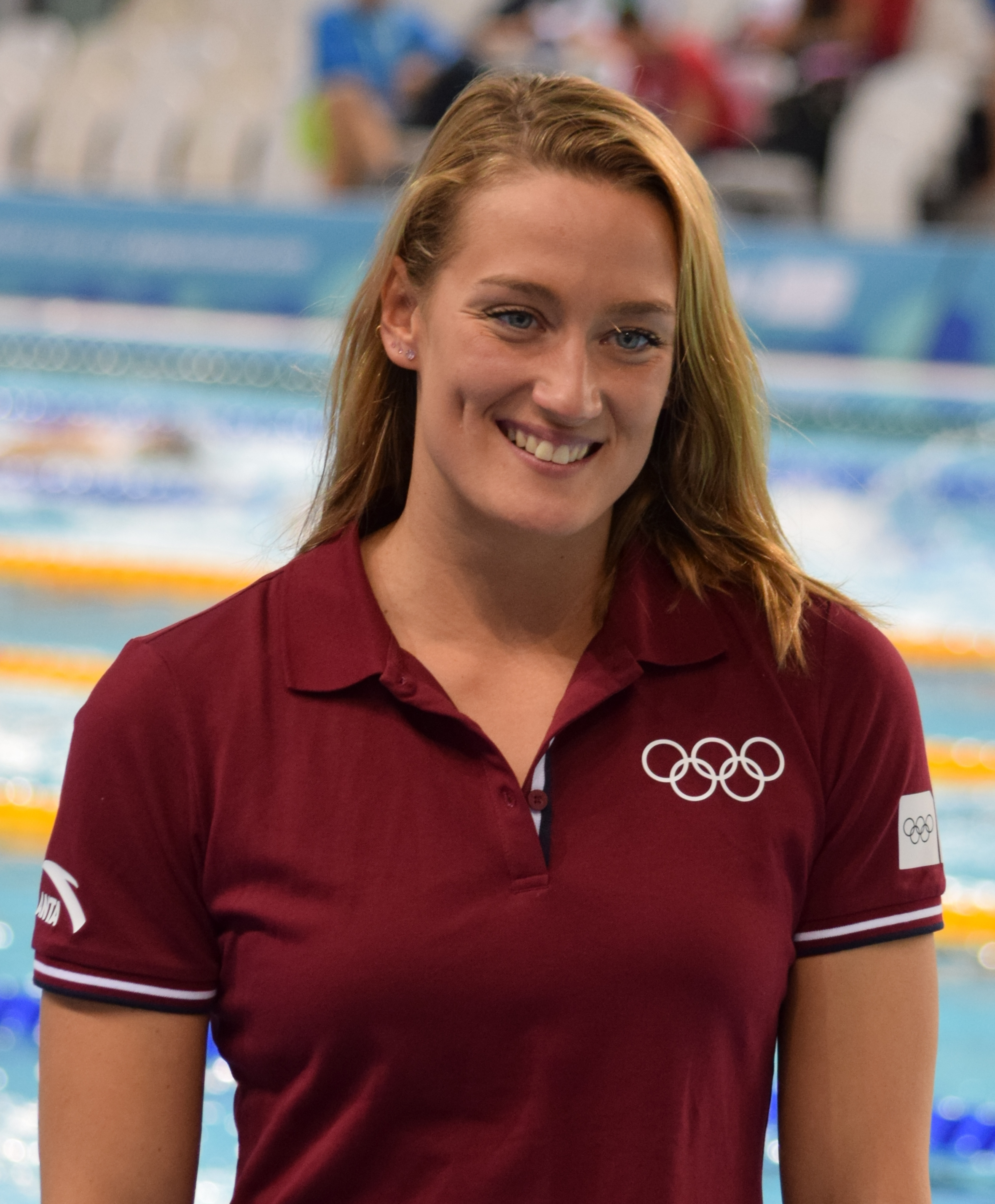
Mireia Belmonte

- Eduard Admetlla i Lázaro (1924–2019), scuba diver pioneer who set the record of reaching 100m deep in 1957
- Manuel Estiarte (born 1961), former water polo player
- Gemma Mengual (born 1977), synchronised swimmer
- Mireia Belmonte (born 1990), medley, freestyle and butterfly swimmer, first woman ever under 8 min in 800m freestyle

=== Tennis ===
- Arantxa Sánchez Vicario (born 1971), 3-time French Open winner (1989, 1994 & 1998), US Open winner (1994)
- Juan Aguilera (born 1962)
- Sergi Bruguera (born 1971), 2-time French Open winner (1993 & 1994)
- Àlex Corretja (born 1974)
- Albert Costa (born 1975), French Open winner (2002)
- Carlos Costa (born 1968)
- Andrés Gimeno (1937–2019), French Open winner (1972)
- Juan Gisbert (born 1942)
- Marcel Granollers (born 1986), active
- Marc López (born 1982), active
- Félix Mantilla (born 1974)
- Tommy Robredo (born 1982), active

=== Other ===
- Carlos Rodríguez (born 1979), former professional darts player
- Juan Antonio Samaranch (1920–2010), president of the IOC from 1980 to 2001
- Dani Sánchez (born 1974), professional carom billiards player
- José María Solé Chavero (born 1969), wheelchair basketball player

== Scientists and engineers ==
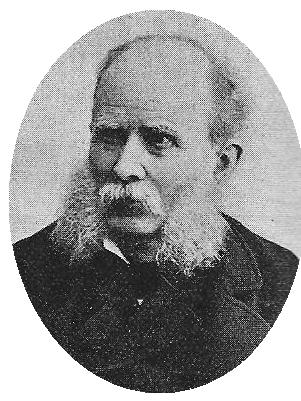
Narcís Monturiol

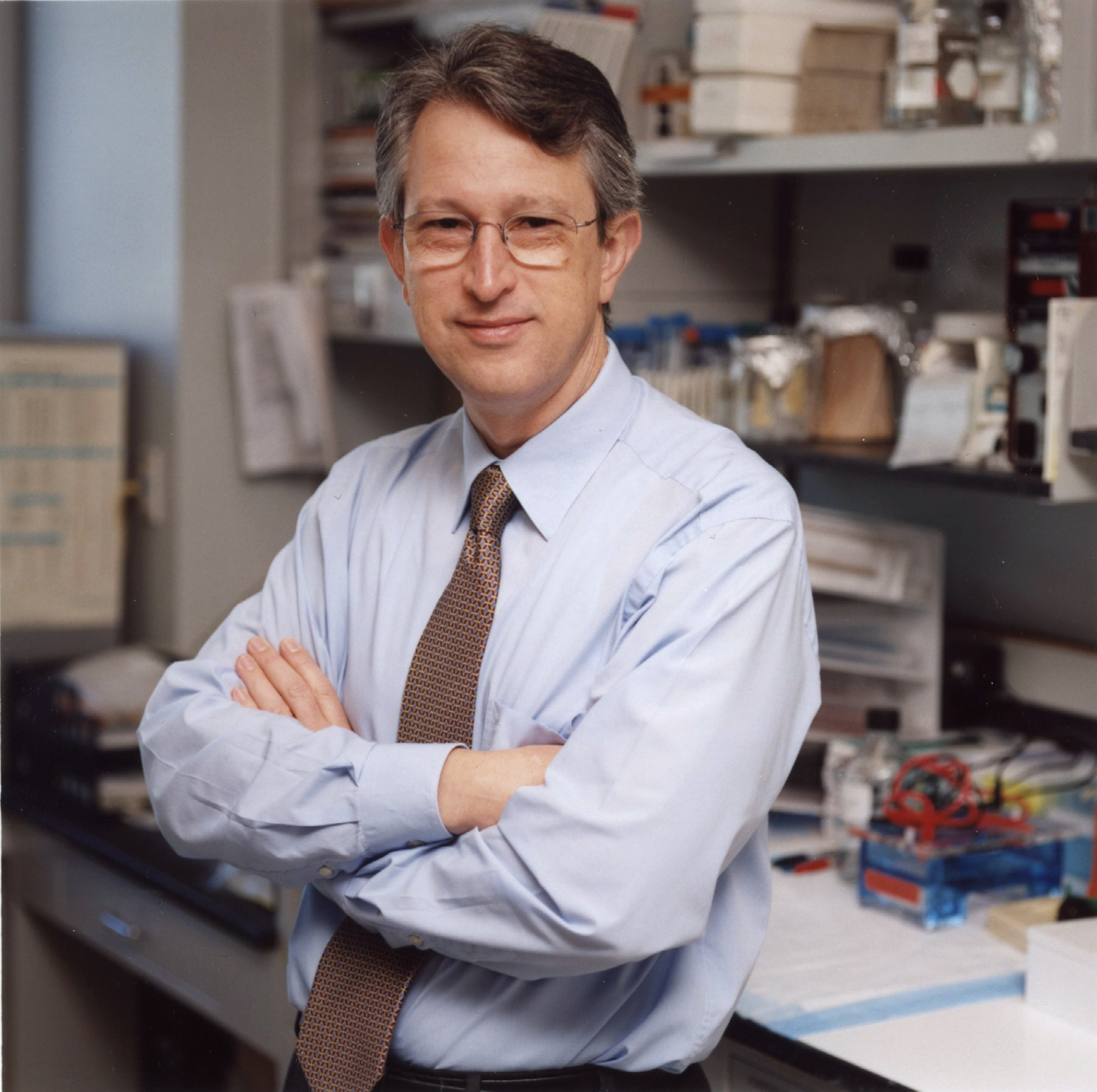
Joan Massagué

- François Arago (1786–1853), scientist
- Ildefons Cerdà (1815–1876), urban planner
- Narcís Monturiol (1819–1885), inventor of the first combustion-driven submarine
- Josep Comas i Solà (1868–1937), astronomer, discoverer of the asteroid named 'Barcelona'
- Ignacio Barraquer (Barcelona 1884–1965), ophthalmologist known for his contributions to the advancement of cataract surgery. Son of Josep Antoni Barraquer
- Esteban Terradas i Illa (1883–1950), mathematician, scientist and engineer
- Pere Bosch-Gimpera (1891–1974), anthropologist, archaeologist and prehistorian
- Josep Trueta (1897–1977), doctor, professor of orthopedy at Oxford
- Jose Barraquer (1916–1998), father of modern refractive surgery and son of Ignacio Barraquer; invented the cryolathe and microkeratome and developed many surgical procedures

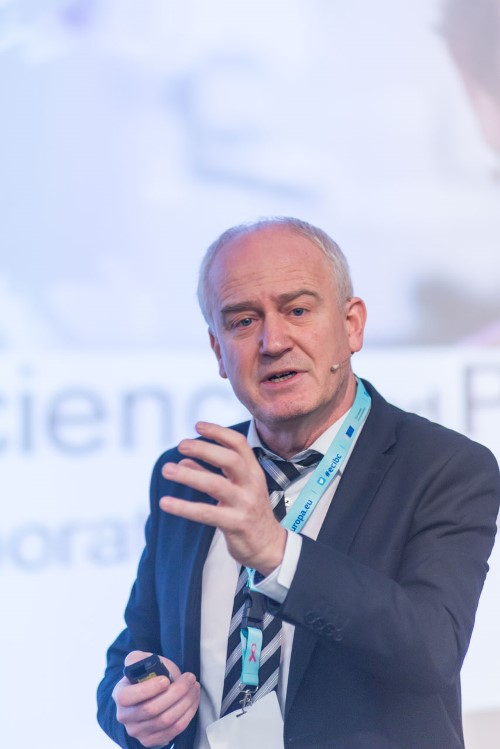
Josep Figueras

- Ramon Margalef (1919–2004), pioneer and outstanding researcher in limnology, marine biology, and ecology
- Jordi Sabater Pi (1922–2009), primatologist
- Joan Oró (1923–2004), biologist
- Pere Alberch (1923–2004), biologist and embryologist, professor at Harvard University from 1980 to 1989 and director of the Museo Nacional de Ciencias Naturales, Madrid.
- Valentín Fuster (born 1943), Doctor of Medicine, director of the Cardiology Institute in Mount Sinai Hospital, New York
- Eudald Carbonell (born 1953), archaeologist, anthropologist and paleonthologist
- Joan Massagué (born 1953), scientist and pharmacist, specialized in the study of cancer metastasis
- Josep Baselga (1959–2021), oncologist
- Josep Figueras (born 1959), health policy expert and founding director of the European Observatory on Health Systems and Policies
- Ignacio Cirac (born 1965), physicist, best known for his contributions to quantum information science
- Manel Esteller (born 1968), doctor, specialized in the study of cancer

== Gastronomy ==
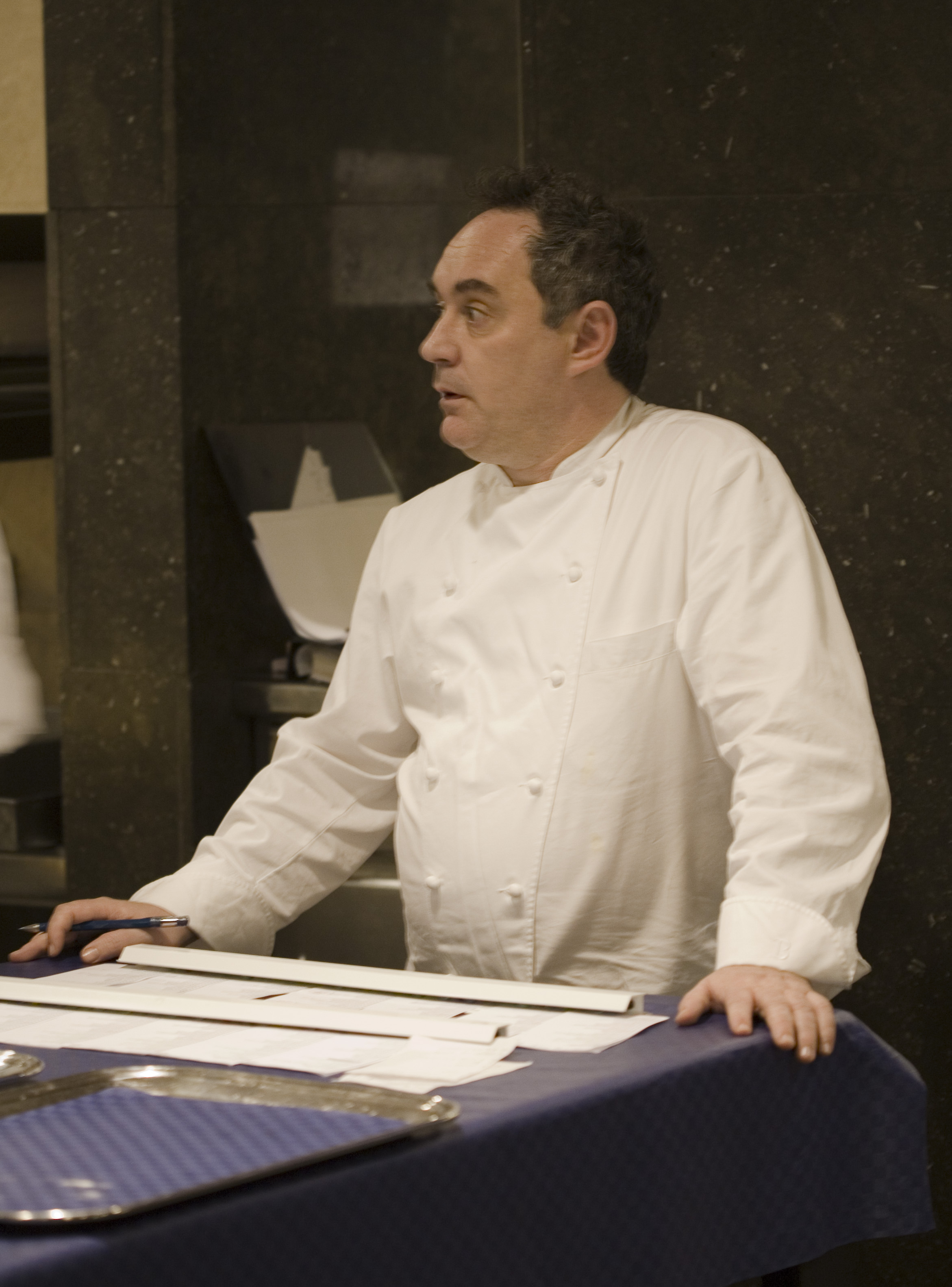
Ferran Adrià

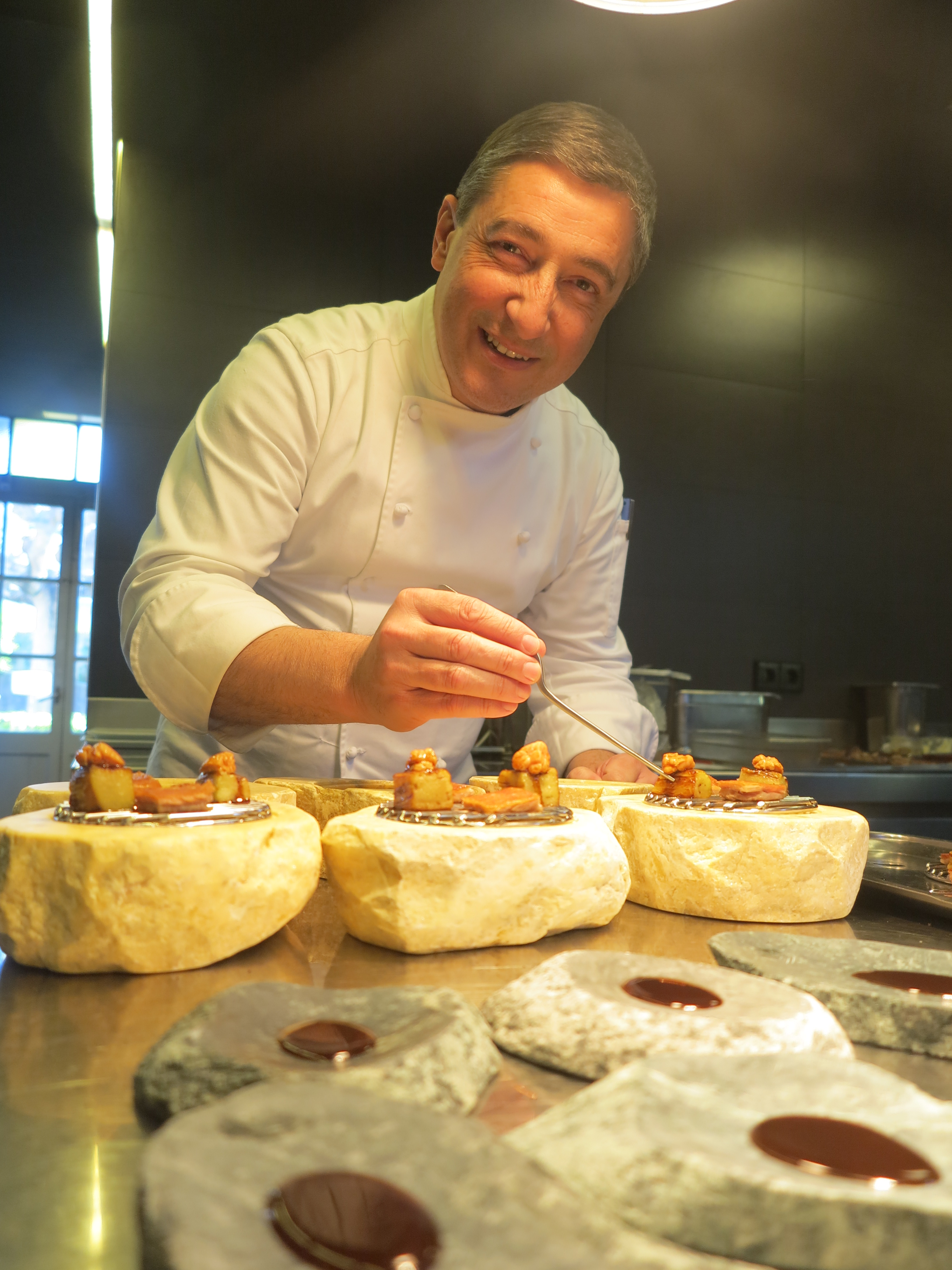
Joan Roca

- Carme Ruscalleda (born 1952), chef of Sant Pau
- Santi Santamaria (1957–2011), chef of Can Fabes
- Ferran Adrià (born 1962), chef of El Bulli
- Joan Roca i Fontané (born 1964), chef of El Celler de Can Roca
- Josep Roca i Fontané (born 1966), sommelier of El Celler de Can Roca
- Jordi Roca i Fontané (born 1978), pastry chef of El Celler de Can Roca

== Saints and religious figures ==
- Raymond of Penyafort (1175–1275), Roman Catholic saint and Dominican
- Vicent Ferrer (1350–1419), Valencian Dominican friar, who gained acclaim as a missionary and a logician.
- Pope Callixtus III, Alfons de Borja (1378–1458), Valencian pope
- Pope Alexander VI, Roderic de Borja (1431–1503), Valencian pope
- Gertrudis Anglesola (1641-1727), Valencian Cistercian abbess and mystic
- Joseph Oriol (1650–1702)
- Juníper Serra (1713–1784), Roman Catholic saint and Franciscan missionary
- Maria Pilar Bruguera Sábat (1906–1994), Roman Catholic nun and physician
- Anthony Mary Claret (1807–1870), founder of the Missionary Sons of the Immaculate Heart of Mary
- Francisco Coll Guitart (1812–1875), Roman Catholic saint and Dominican; founder of the Dominican Sisters of the Annunciation of the Blessed Virgin
- Josep Sadoc Alemany (1814–1888), first Roman Catholic archbishop of San Francisco, California
- Vicente Ferrer Moncho (1920–2009), Jesuit missionary; humanitarian
- Jaime Hilario Barbal (1898–1937), Catalan priest and educator, canonized as a saint of the Roman Catholic Church in 1999.
- Cassià Maria Just (1926–2008), Benedictine abbot, one of the people in the Spanish Catholic Church who opposed Francisco Franco
- Lluís Martínez Sistach (born 1937), former Cardinal Archbishop of Barcelona (2004-2015); member of the Supreme Tribunal of the Apostolic Signatura

== Others ==
- Nahmanides (1194–1270), Catalan-Jewish philosopher
- Pompeu Fabra (1868–1948), grammarian
- Rosa Sensat (1873–1961), early Doctor of Pedagogy
- Alexandre Deulofeu (1903–1977), historian
- Joan Gili (1907–1998), antiquarian book-seller, publisher and translator
- Juan Pujol García (alias Garbo) (1912–1988), double agent who played a major role in the Invasion of Normandy during World War II
- Rafael Marquina (1921–2013), designer and architect
- Pilar Espuña i Domènech (1928–2010), Catalan labor and feminist activist
- Jordi Nadal (1929–2020), historian
- Salvador Puig i Antich (1948–1974), Catalan anarchist, executed during Franco's regime
- Jaume Marxuach i Flaquer (1906–1966), lawyer and writer
- Joan Laporta i Estruch (born 1962), lawyer, president of FC Barcelona, and politician

== See also ==
- List of Andorrans
- List of Balearics
- List of Valencians
- Lists of people by nationality
- List of Spaniards
- List of French people
