= José Solé =

José Solé may refer to:

- José Gil Solé (1929–2000), Spanish racing cyclist
- José María Solé Chavero (born 1969), Spanish wheelchair basketball athlete
- José Solé (actor) (1929–2017), Mexican theater director, stage actor, and set designer
