= Enric Roig i Masriera =

Enric Roig Masriera
- Born: 1 January 1892; Barcelona, Spain
- Died: 17 December 1962 (aged 70); Barcelona, Spain
- Education: Liceu Conservatory
- Occupations: Violinist, poet, musicologist
- Known for: Advocacy of contemporary music; support for Arnold Schoenberg and Robert Gerhard
- Notable work: The XVIth century Italian violinists; The value of contemporary music; The creators of the classic opera in Naples; Songs of the troubadours; Discòfils - Associació Pro-Música; Estudi Masriera / Companyia Belluguet; Universitat Pompeu Fabra (legacy archive); National Library of Catalonia (recordings)

Enric Roig Masriera (Barcelona, 1892 - ibid, 17 December 1962) was a violinist, poet and musicologist.

== Training ==
He was one of the Masrieras, a renowned family of artists of modernism (Lluís Masriera i Rosés, Josep Masriera i Manovens, Francesc Masriera i Manovens) present in various fields of culture. He was educated at Liceu Conservatory. Its cultural and artistic training was influenced mainly by the family. He worked closely with his family playing music and plays in the workshop Estudi Masriera/Petit teatre at Bailen street under the name of Lluís Masriera/Companyia Belluguet. He grew up and was formed artistically and culturally in this environment .

== Musicologist ==
His main achievement was to have extended the field of music research, both to the Preclassic and into the modern past . In an atmosphere of inertia and scarcity, he defended the work and the theory of Arnold Schoenberg and his followers, including his friend Robert Gerhard i Ottenwaelder. Among his pupils there were renowned musicians such as Manuel Garcia Morante, Enric Gispert, Joan Guinjoan and Joaquim Homs Oller to whom, despite not being his pupil, he transmitted a large direct descent. He is the author of the following essays : The XVIth century Italian violinists The value of contemporary music, The creators of the classic opera in Naples, The sacred classical polyphony Songs of the troubadours, remarks on the interpretation of classical works for violin, and articles in several magazines.

He was a member of several associations and movements around the contemporary music as Discòfils - Associació Pro- Música a pioneering movement in Spain which was active between March 1935 and February 1936, ten years after the birth of the electric recordings, with a clear educational vision of the citizens of his country. This association was encouraged by Joan Prats and Ricard Gomis and had the advice of the Catalan composer Robert Gerhard and the technical assessment of the violinist Enric Roig. These sessions also involved the eminent musicologist Father Higini EAnglès i Pàmies the reviewer Josep Palau i Claveras, the folklorist and Mallorquin composer Baltasar Samper i Marquès and the music critic from Madrid Adolfo Salazar. Part of Enric Roig's legacy as a music teacher is in the Universitat Pompeu Fabra's Library and his recordings collection were given to the National Library of Catalonia.
