= Josep Maria Moliné =

Catalan composer (1819–1883)

Josep Maria Moline (January 25, 1819 - 1883) was a Catalan composer.

== Biography ==
Born in Barcelona, Moline studied composition with the choirmaster of Santa Maria del Mar, Ramon Aleix i Batlle and violin with Francesco Beroni, director of the Santa Cruz Theatre in Barcelona. After traveling to Cuba as a violinist and returning to Barcelona, he started directing the orchestra that performed in the concerts of Josep Anselm Clavé between 1858 and 1866. He also directed the Societat Coral Barcino (Barcino Choral Society).

He was part of several ensembles: the Orchestra of the Grand-Théâtre de Marseille (when he was 14), the Gran Teatro de La Habana and the Philharmonic Society of Saint Cecilia. He wrote and directed a mass at La Matanza church; when he returned to Barcelona he was part of the Liceu theatre where he directed a few operas and solo violin performances.

=== Moments to note ===
- The first concert on 16 July 1862 that were released excerpts of the opera Tanhausser where they put together several bands: Euterpe Choir, the choir of the Liceo women musicians of the orchestra, the Regiment Band of the Princess and the battalion of infantry Infantry Alcantara .
- Prepare the second conductor to receive Queen Elizabeth II Montserrat hearts and clavé Cobla Empordanesa by Pep Ventura .
- 1866 does Euterpe last concert with the orchestra, coinciding with the change of place when it comes to concerts.
- Participated as a judge, and directing the orchestra, choral festivals in 1862 and 1864.

== Works ==
- "El jardin" (schotis) (1861)
- "Celia" (americana) (1862)
- "La festival" (contradanza) (1863)
- "La jalea" (americana) (1863)
- "El diclé" (schotis) (1865)
