= Roger Albinyana i Saigí =

Catalan politician

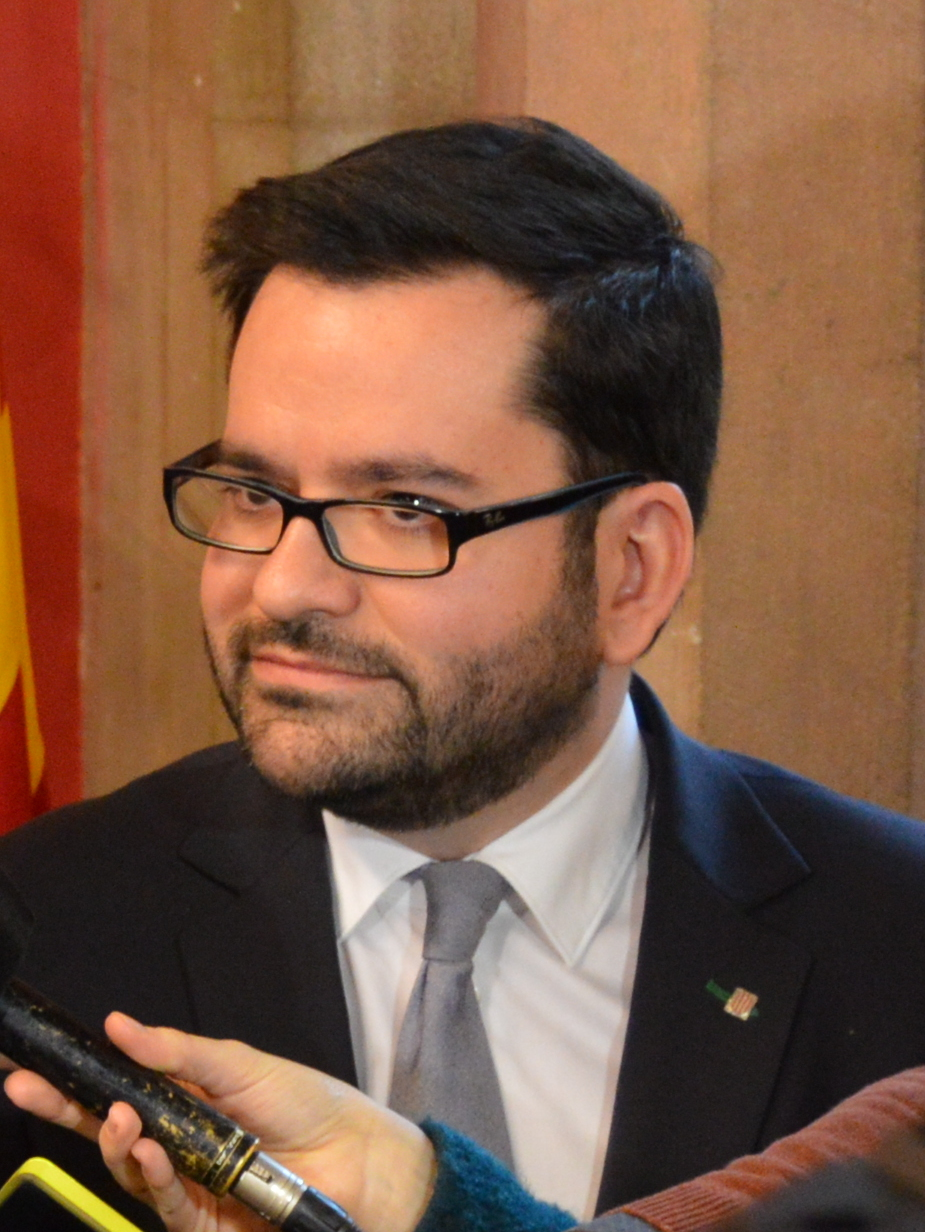
Roger Albinyana i Saigí

Roger Albinyana holds a PhD in Economic History from the University of Barcelona and a MA in Economic History from the same university, a BA in Economics from Pompeu Fabra University and a BA in Business Administration and Management from the Open University of Catalonia.

Albinyana is the Managing Director of the European Institute of the Mediterranean (IEMed). He has been working at the IEMed since 2016 as director of the Euro-Mediterranean Policies department until he was appointed Managing Director. He is also an associate professor at the Faculty of Economics of the University of Barcelona, where he teaches international economic policy. Roger is also a member of the Advisory Council of the Euro-Mediterranean Economists Association (EMEA) and he was a board member at CIDOB (Barcelona Centre for International Affairs) from 2017 to 2025.

Prior to joining the IEMed, he served as Secretary for Foreign and EU Affairs of the Generalitat de Catalunya (2013-2016) and was a member of the European Committee of the Regions. From 2010 to 2013 he served as advisor on private sector development at the Secretariat of the Union for the Mediterranean.

== General references ==
- Gisbert, Josep (15 January 2013). "Mas elige a Roger Albinyana como responsable de Exteriors" [Mas chooses Roger Albinyana as head of foreign affairs]. La Vanguardia (in Spanish). p. 12 – via PressReader.
- "Qui és Roger Albinyana?" [Who is Roger Albinyana?]. VilaWeb (in Catalan). 15 January 2013.
- Rojo, A. (5 January 2014). "Roger Albinyana, el aprendiz de diplomático de Mas" [Roger Albinyana, Mas's diplomatic apprentice]. La Razón (in Spanish).
- "The Secretary". Secretaria d’Afers Exteriors. Archived from the original on 4 December 2016.
