= José María Solé Chavero =

Spanish wheelchair basketball player

José Solé
Personal information
- Full name: José María Solé Chavero
- Nationality: Spanish
- Born: 3 July 1969 (age 56); Sant Feliu de Guíxols, Catalonia, Spain

Sport
- Country: Spain
- Sport: Wheelchair basketball

José María Solé Chavero (born 3 July 1969 in Sant Feliu de Guíxols, Catalonia) is a wheelchair basketball athlete from Spain. He has a physical disability: he is a 1-point wheelchair basketball player. He played wheelchair basketball at the 1996 Summer Paralympics. His team was fourth.
