= Dau al set (magazine) =

- Categories: Avant-garde
- Founder: Joan-Josep Tharrats
- First issue: September 1948
- Final issue: 1951
- Country: Catalonia
- Language: Catalan

Dau al set was a Catalan avant-garde magazine founded in September 1948 by Joan-Josep Tharrats and directed by Joan Ponç. The magazine was produced by the artistic group Dau al Set. It was the continuation of another magazine called Algol (magazine) published by the same group. The magazine had eight pages measuring 250 mm × 175 mm (9.8 in × 6.9 in). The texts were written in Catalan and Spanish. The magazine continued publishing numbers until December 1951.

== Themes and collaborators ==
At the beginning, the magazine followed Dadaism and the authors expressed their hatred towards society. Later on, it evolved a new surrealistic attitude. Due to this variety and evolution, in 1950, the magazine became a space where everybody could follow innovative artists.

Dau al Set was a Catalan avant-garde group formed by poet Joan Brossa, the philosopher Arnau Puig and the painters Antoni Tàpies, Joan Pons, Modest Cuixart and Joan-Josep Tharrats.

Contributors to the magazine included Joan Brossa, Arnau Puig, J. E. Cirlot, A. Cirici Pellicer, Jean Cocteau, Àngel Ferrant, J. V. Foix, Francis Picabia, Cesàreo Rodríguez Aguilera, Enrique Sordo and Michel Tapié. The magazine offered drawings by Modest Cuixart, Joan Ponç, Antoni Tàpies and Joan Josep Tharrats.

The Museum of Modern Art rated the magazine as one of the 20 best avant-garde magazines from the 20th century.

== See also ==
- List of avant-garde magazines
