= Algol (magazine) =

1947 Catalan-language magazine

Algol was an avant-garde Catalan magazine edited by the artistic group Dau al Set and first published in 1947. It was founded by Joan Pons and Joan Brossa and edited by Enric Tomo i Freixes. Only 100 copies of Algol were published which all appeared in 1947. The 12-page magazine was printed on guarro, a type of linen paper.

Dau al Set was formed by the poet Joan Brossa, the philosopher Arnau Puig and the painters Joan Pons, Antoni Tàpies, Modest Cuixart and Joan-Josep Tharrats. It was a very important group in the Spanish post-war era. The magazine included literary texts by Brossa and Puig and illustrations by Pons, Jordi Mercadé and Francesc Boadella.

The group later published another magazine, called Dau al Set after their own name, which was the sequel to Algol. Dau al Set was first published in 1948 and had a total of 56 pages. It also contained works by Brossa, Puig, and many other artists.

== See also ==
- List of avant-garde magazines
