= List of avant-garde magazines =

This is a list of magazines which contain avant-garde material and content. One of their common characteristics was their unpredictable appearance. Notable avant-garde magazines include:

== 0–9 ==
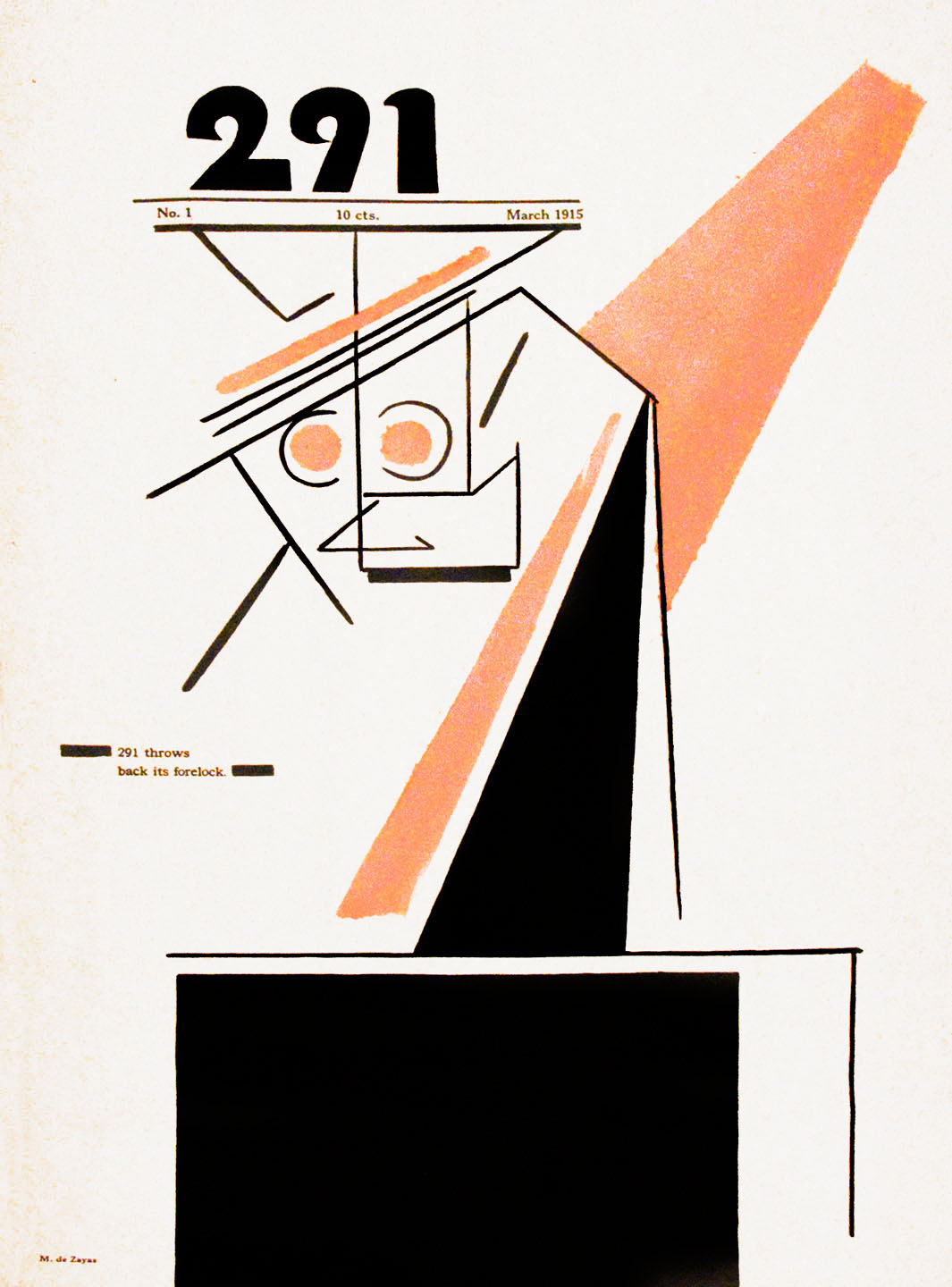
291

- 3:AM Magazine (2000–), Paris
- 291 (1915–1916), New York City
- 391 (1917–1924), Barcelona

== A ==
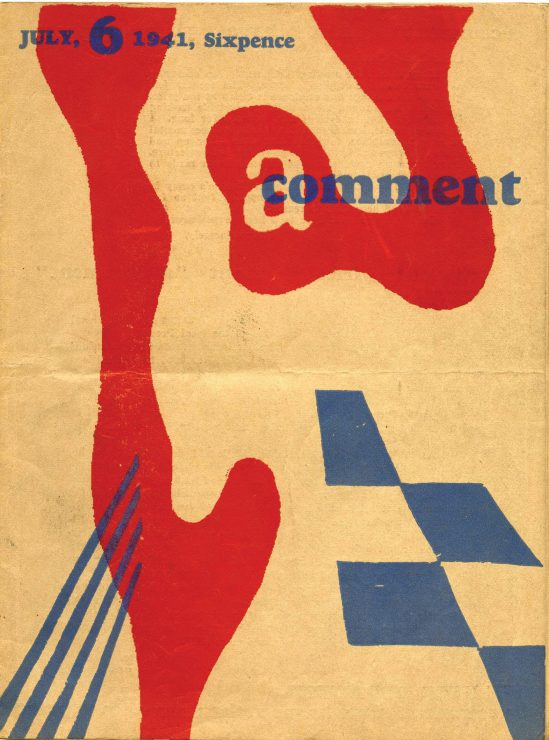
aCOMMENT cover July 1941

- aCOMMENT (1940–1947), Melbourne
- Al Adab (1953–2012), Beirut
- Akasztott Ember (1922–1923), Vienna
- Algol (1947), Catalonia
- Apollon (1909–1917), St. Petersburg
- Der Ararat (1918–1921), Munich
- Avant-Garde (1968–1971), New York City

== B ==
- Bauhaus (1926–1931), Germany
- Black Music (1973–1984), United Kingdom

== C ==
- Cantrills Filmnotes (1971–2000), Melbourne
- Cuadernos (1953–1965), Paris
- Ça Ira (1920–1923), Antwerp

== D ==
- Dau al set (1948–1951), Catalonia
- Denver Quarterly (1966–), Denver
- The Dial (1840–1929), United States
- The Dome (1897–1900), London

== E ==
- Emigre (1984–2005), Berkeley, CA

== F ==
- Frigidaire (1980–2008), Rome

== G ==
- La Gaceta Literaria (1927–1932), Madrid
- Galerie 68 (1968–1971), Cairo
- Grecia (1918–1920), Seville-Madrid

== H ==
- Helhesten (1941–1944), Copenhagen

== J ==
- La Jeune Belgique (1880–1897), Brussels

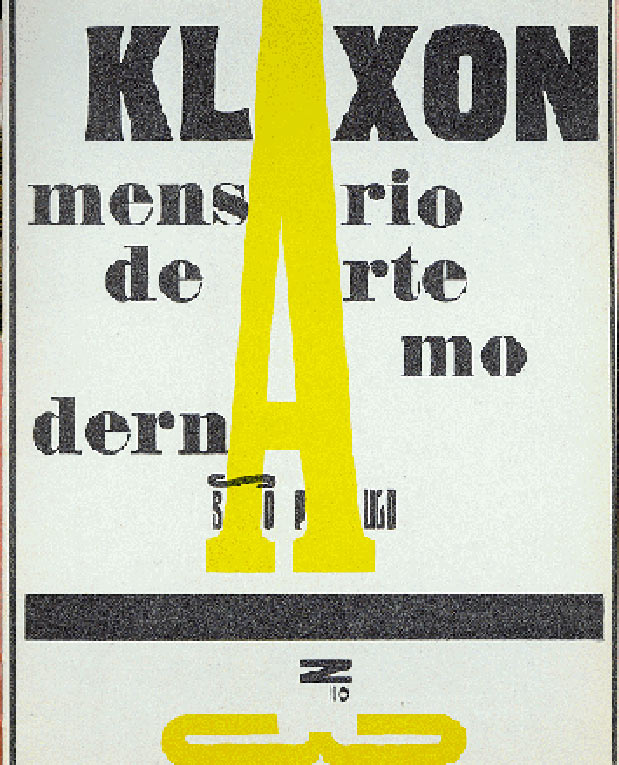
Klaxon

== K ==
- Kallol (1923–1925), Calcutta
- Kino-Fot (1922–1923), Soviet Union
- Klaxon (1922–1923), São Paulo, Brazil
- Klingen (1917–1920), Copenhagen
- Kritisk Revy (1926–1928), Copenhagen

== L ==
- Language (1978–1981), United States
- The Little Review (1914–1929), United States
- London Bulletin (1938–1940), London

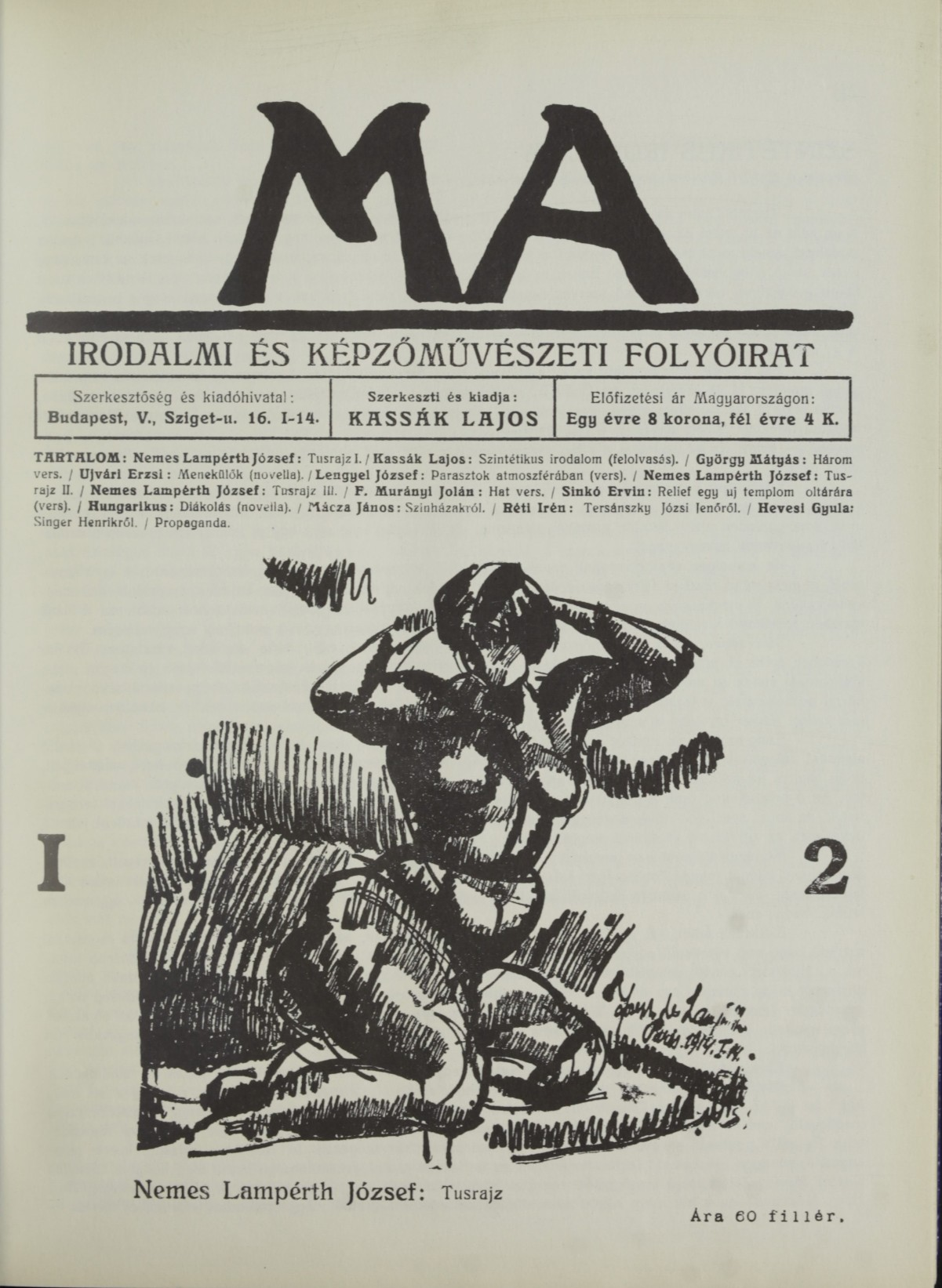
MA

== M ==
- MA (1916–1925), Budapest–Vienna
- Al Majalla Al Jadida (1929–1944), Cairo
- Martin Fiero (1924–1927), Buenos Aires
- Merlin (1952–1954), Paris
- Minotaure (1933–1939), Paris
- Musicworks (1978–), Toronto

== N ==
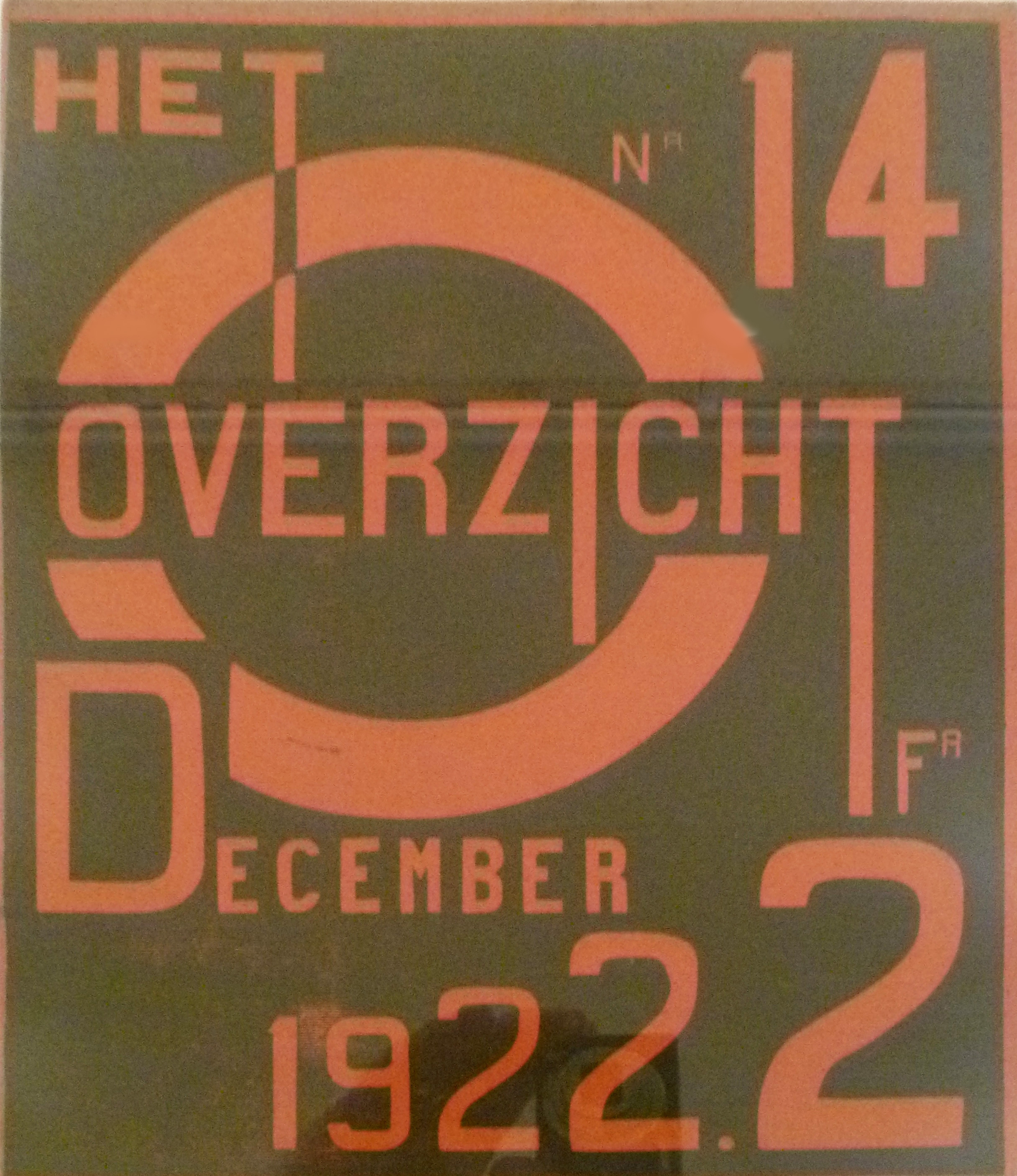
Het Overzicht

- Noi: Rivista d’arte futurista (1917–1925), Rome
- Nomad (1959–1962), Los Angeles
- Nou Nou Hau (1998–2002), Japan

== O ==
- Octubre (1933–1934), Madrid
- Orpheus (1932–1934), Milan
- Het Overzicht (1921–1925), Antwerp

== P ==
- Poedjangga Baroe (1933–1942), Jakarta
- Poesia (1905–), Milan
- Portfolio: An Intercontinental Quarterly (1945–1947), Washington, DC
- Prometeo (1908–1912), Madrid
- Punct (1924–1925), Bucharest

== Q ==
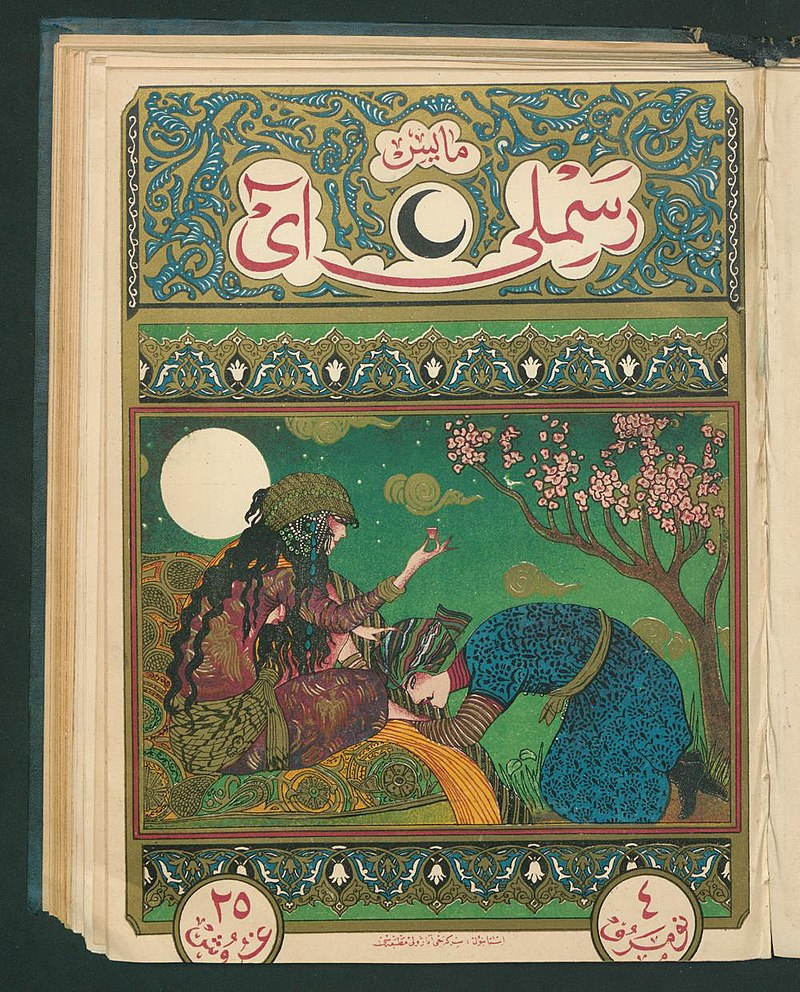
Resimli Ay

- The Quarterly (1987–1995), New York City
- Quosego (1928–1929), Helsinki

== R ==
- Ray (1926–1927), United Kingdom
- Resimli Ay (1924–1938), Istanbul
- Revista de Avance (1927–1930), Havana
- Revista de Antropofagia (1928-1929), Brasil

== S ==
- S4N (1919–1925), Northampton, MA
- Sburătorul (1919–1927), Bucharest
- Servet-i Fünun (1891–1944), Istanbul
- Shi'r (1957–1969), Beirut
- Shirakaba (1910–1917), Tokyo
- Signal, International Review of Signalist Research (1970–2004), Belgrade
- Simbolul (1912), Bucharest
- Sobaka (1998–2006), Russia
- De Stijl (1917–), Amsterdam
- Der Sturm (1910–1932), Berlin
- As-Sufūr (1915–1925), Cairo

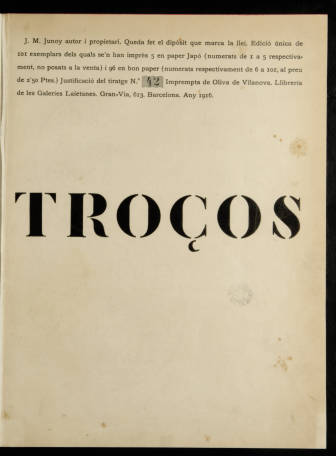
Troços

== T ==
- Taarnet (1893–1894), Copenhagen
- Al Tatawwur (1940), Cairo
- Tel Quel (1960–1982), Paris
- A Tett (1915–1916), Hungary
- Thalia (1910–1913), Stockholm
- Troços (1916–1917), Barcelona
- Tropiques (1941-1945), Martinica

== U ==
- Ultra (1922), Helsinki
- Unu (1928–1932), Bucharest

== V ==
- Valori plastici (1918–1921), Rome
- Il Verri (1956–), Milan
- VOU (1935–1978), Nagoya, Japan

== W ==
- The Wire (1982–), London
- Washington Review (1974–2002), Washington, D.C.
- White Fungus (2004–), Taichung City

== Y ==
- Yoru no Funsui (1938–1939), Nagoya, Japan.
- Yung-yidish (1918–1921), Łódź

== Z ==
- Zwrotnica (1922–1923; 1926–1927), Kraków
