= Joan-Josep Tharrats =

Spanish painter

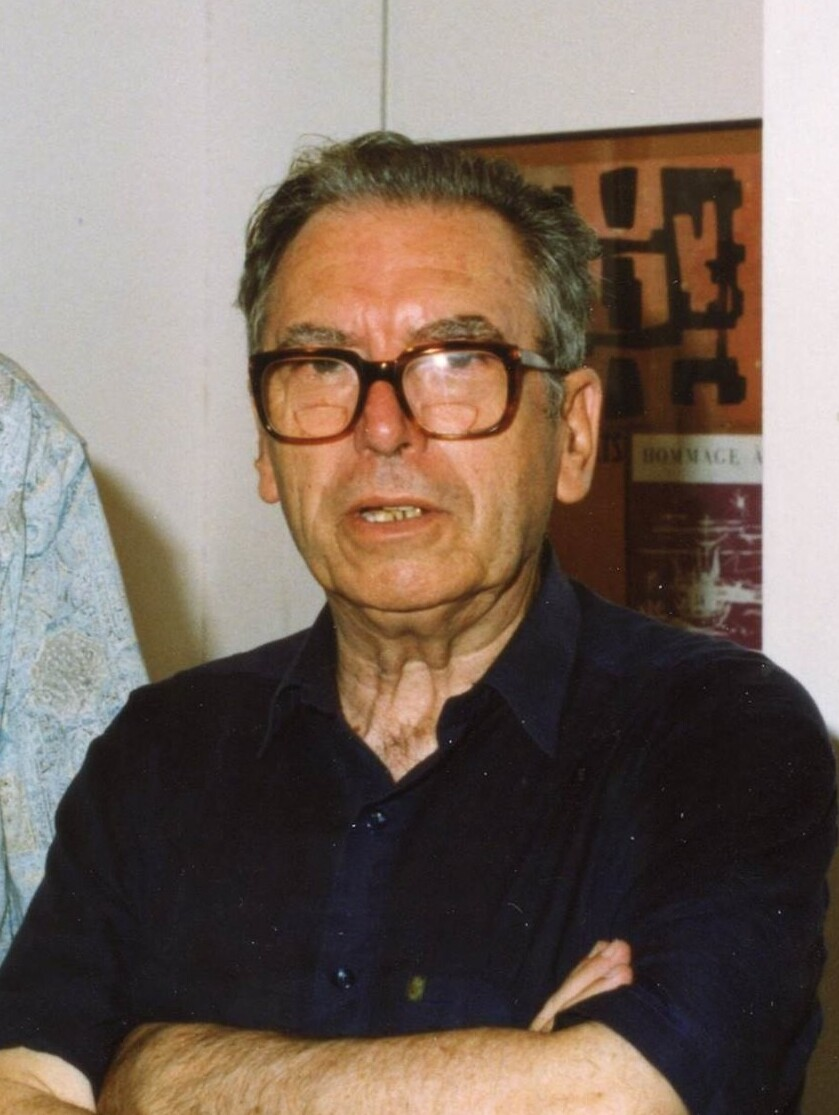
- Born: 5 March 1918; Girona, Spain
- Died: 4 July 2001 (aged 83); Barcelona, Spain
- Occupations: Painter, publisher
- Known for: Dau al set

Joan-Josep Tharrats i Vidal (5 March 1918 in Girona – 4 July 2001 in Barcelona) was a Catalan painter, art theorist and publisher.

Born into an industrialist family, his father was the businessman and poet Josep Tharrats i Vilà. From 1932 to 1935 he lived in Béziers, before relocating to Barcelona where he studied at the Escola Massana. The Spanish Civil War brought his studies to an end, and he wouldn't resume his art career until 1942. His initial style was akin to Impressionism but moved into abstraction as the influence of Piet Mondrian and Wassily Kandinsky became more important to him. From 1946 on he used collage techniques. In 1947 he was introduced to artists Arnau Puig Grau, Joan Ponç, Modest Cuixart, Antoni Tàpies, Joan Brossa and Josep Vicenç Foix at the Institut Français in Barcelona. With some of these artists he founded the group Dau al Set, which published the magazine of the same name, printed in his atelier.

He was one of the most visible artists in the local avantgarde art of the post-war years. His style evolved from lineal abstraction influenced by surrealism (during his Dau al Set years) towards Art Informel working with texture, color and graphism. His work also includes a variety of posters, books, murals, stained glass, mosaics, jewelry and opera scenography. També va fer cartells, il·lustrà llibres i va fer murals, vitralls, mosaics, joies i fins i tot escenografies d'òpera (Spleen de 1984).

He had an individual exhibition in 1949 at the El Jardín gallery in Barcelona and became one of the most important Catalan artists in the international scene. From 1954 onwards he became a fixture of the Sala Gaspar in Barcelona and from 1955 in Stockholm and New York City. In 1959 his work was exhibited at the 5th São Paulo Biennale and at the Venice Biennale of 1960 and 1964. In 1966 he founded the Associació d'Artistes Actuals.

In 2000, Tharrats himself collaborated with monumental and small oil paintings in his last exhibition which was organized by Galeria Taüll of Barcelona.

In 2009, an important traveling exhibition called "Les maculatures de Tharrats" was arranged by the Cultural Department of the Diputació de Barcelona.

== Bibliography ==
- Antoni Tàpies o el Dau Modern de Versalles (1950)
- Artistas españoles en el ballet (1950)
- Cent anys de pintura a Cadaqués (1981) ISBN 84-95554-27-5
- Picasso i els artistes catalans en el ballet (1982)
- Dames de tots colors (1992)
- Joan Josep Tharrats i la seva època (1999)
