= Cecily Crozier =

Australian artist, poet and literary editor (1911–2006)

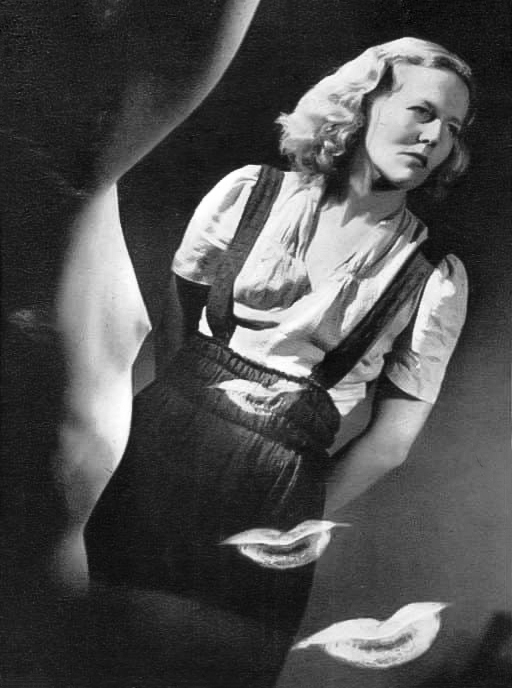
- Irvine Greene, "Passion Waiting," portrait of Cecily Crozier from aCOMMENT issue 12
- Born: Cecily Medland Crozier; 21 July 1911; Elsternwick, Victoria, Australia
- Died: 2006; Adelaide, South Australia
- Occupations: Poet and editor

Cecily Medland Crozier (21 July 1911, Elsternwick – 2006, Adelaide) was an Australian artist, poet and literary editor who co-founded aCOMMENT, an avant-garde literary magazine in Melbourne.

== Biography ==
Crozier was born in Elsternwick, on 21 July 1911 to Australian-born parents Robert Henry Crozier (1884–1939), a mining engineer, and Elsa McGillivray (1881–1957). She had two brothers, Laurie and Brian, two and five years her junior. The family was well-to-do and Crozier's presence at weddings as flower girl or bridesmaid was reported in the social pages of Melbourne newspapers. Her uncle was Frank R. Crozier, an Australian official war artist in WWI who was to continue a career as a painter after the war, and one of whose exhibitions was later organised by Crozier.

The family traveled for her father's work, first in Burma, before a return to Melbourne, and then to London when she was about ten. Retreating from the London climate after two years her mother Elsa took the family to the south of France, to Nice, then Grasse, and Montpellier. There Crozier was educated at a convent for three months, and then in a Lycee until age fifteen. She learned piano before another move at eighteen to London, and there worked as an artist's model. She joined her fiancé Nico for several years in Alexandria, where she designed and made clothes.

== aCOMMENT ==
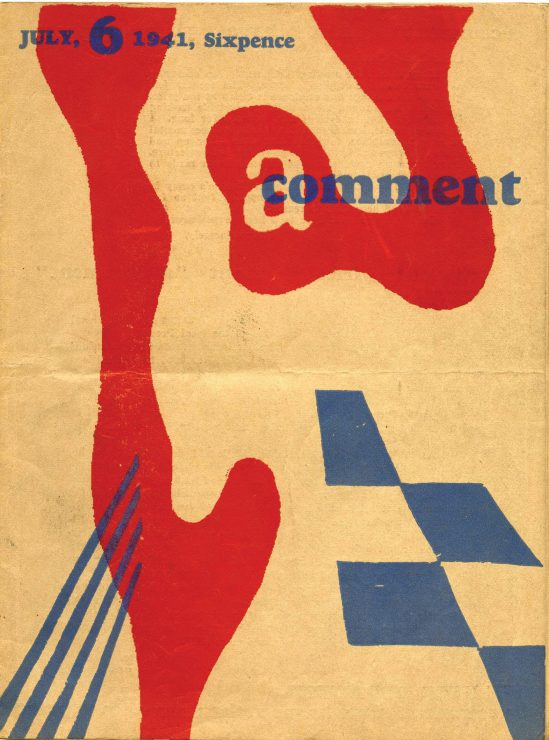
ACOMMENT cover July 1941

When WW2 began Crozier returned with her mother to Australia. In 1940, noting Melbourne's lack of an avant-garde literary magazine, Cecily, then aged 29, with her cousins Sylvia, Eila and Irvine Heber Green (1913–1997) decided to publish one. It appeared in September 1940, one month before its better known contemporary, Angry Penguins which it outlived. It was at first titled Comment, before settling on the less strident aCOMMENT; set thus on each cover, with lower case 'a' before all capitals. Due to wartime shortages the magazine was printed on brown wrapping paper by Bradley Printers.

Irvine Green was a photographer, writer, and artist whose design, woodcuts, linocuts and tipped-in photographs appear throughout all editions of aCOMMENT until its demise after 26 issues in 1947. Soon after he joined the RAAF and was posted in aerial reconnaissance, he and Crozier married in July 1941. However, the relationship did not survive her affairs with two American contributors to the magazine Karl Shapiro and Harry Roskolenko, whose daughter she bore in 1947. Both wrote her into their later autobiographies; as Shapiro's ‘Bonamy Quorn’ in his Younger Son; and Roskolenko's ‘Emily’ in his books Baedecker of a Bachelor and The Terrorized.

aCOMMENT promoted experimental, often surrealist, writing and art, publishing the work of some of Australia's most prominent modernists of the 1940s, including James Gleeson, Albert Tucker, Michael Keon, Muir Holburn, Max Harris, Adrian Lawlor and Alister Kershaw. It ran at a loss, with costs often met by Crozier and Green, until it was forced to fold after the Winter issue of 1947

== Later life ==
Divorced from Green, Crozier married Ernst Heydeman, a Jewish chemist who had escaped from his native Germany and spent the war years with the French Foreign Legion in Morocco before arriving in Australia about 1950, and whom she met through her piano teacher Dr Hermann Schilberger.

She bred & showed Dachshunds at her Longlo Kennels in Central Ave., Croydon, and later in Adelaide.

Freelance historian David Rainey collaborated with Crozier in developing Comment Publications and associated website as an archive of the magazine with a biography of Crozier developed from late-life interviews with her.

Crozier had completed drafts of her unpublished autobiographical Memoirs of an Australian Woman before she died at a nursing home in Adelaide in 2006, at age 95.

== Works by ==
- Untitled, 1947 correspondence:aCOMMENT. Winter no. 26 1947; (p. [20])
- New Country, 1944 column: aCOMMENT, July no. 20 1944; (p. [2])
- Sand, 1944 short story: aCOMMENT, January no. 18 1944; (p. 4, 6)
- Tails Up with Sylvia Green, Eila Green, Cecily Crozier (editor), Melbourne : aCOMMENT Publications, [1944] selected work children's fiction and poetry
- Untitled Cecily Crozier 1942 column: aCOMMENT, October no. 13 1942; (p. [9])
- Parfum Exotique "When, my eyes closed, on an Autumn night", Charles Baudelaire, 1942 poetry: aCOMMENT, October no. 13 1942; (p. [6])
- Untitled, 1941 correspondence: aCOMMENT, July no. 6 1941; (p. inserted after page 10)
- Angry Penguins [Cecily Crozier], 1941 review: aCOMMENT, May no. 5 1941; (p. [14])
- Review of Angry Penguins 1940-1943 periodical (9 issues)
- Untitled "they walk down the street", 1941 poetry: aCOMMENT, May no. 5 1941; (p. [11])
- Cafe Concert "She walked, for walking, using curvulatious hips for swinging at...", with Irvine Green, 1941 poetry: aCOMMENT, March no. 4 1941; (p. [15])
- Untitled, 1941 correspondence: aCOMMENT, November no. 8 1941; (p. 11)
- Tears for a Dead Bird is "the grass is high, there are purple patches in the grass," 1940-1941: aCOMMENT, Christmas no. 3 1940-1941; (p. [12])
- As in a Dream 1940-1941 prose: aCOMMENT, Christmas no. 3 1940-1941; (p. [9])
- Wildly shaking trees, 1940 poetry: COMMENT, November no. 2 1940; (p. [13])
- Le Bon Dieu, 1940 short story: COMMENT, November no. 2 1940; (p. [10-12])
- Untitled, 1940 column: COMMENT, November no. 2 1940; (p. [3])
- Untitled green are her eyes, 1940 poetry: COMMENT, September no. 1 1940; (p. [7])

== Works about ==
Appears in Know My Name: Australian Women Artists 1900 To Now, Part 2, 12 June 2021 – 26 January 2022, at the National Gallery of Australia
