= ACOMMENT =

Australian modernist avant-garde literary magazine of the 1940s

aCOMMENT was an early Australian modernist avant-garde literary "little magazine" of the 1940s published in Melbourne by Cecily Crozier. It ran to twenty-six, mostly quarterly, issues from 1940 to 1947.

== History ==
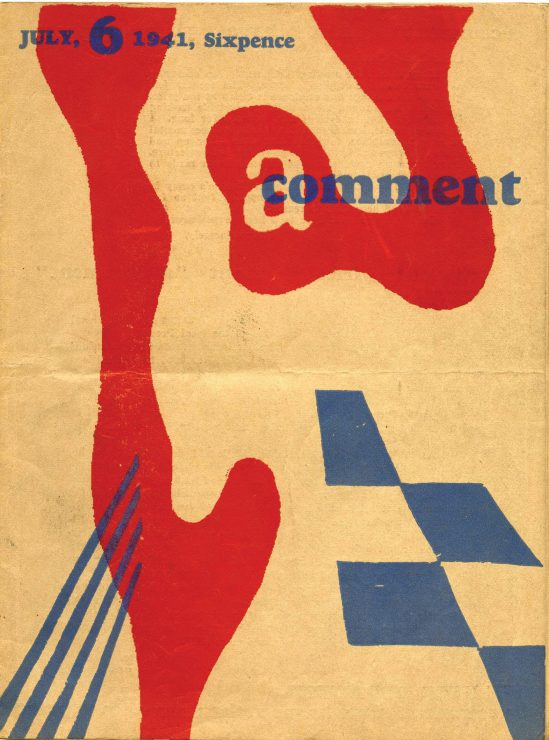

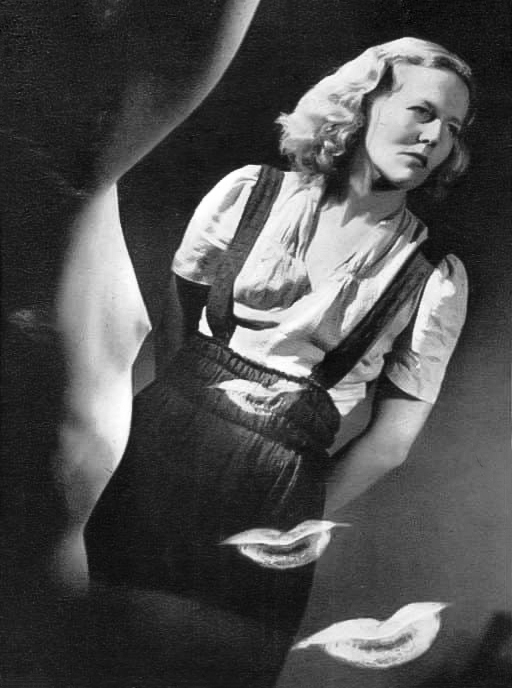
Irvine Green (1941-2) Portrait of Cecily Crozier, photographic montage, tipped-in inclusion in aCOMMENT issue 12

Cecily Crozier, recently returned with her mother to Australia at the commencement of WW2, noted in 1940 that Melbourne had no avant-garde literary magazine. Despite wartime being inopportune for the launch of such a venture she, with her cousins Sylvia, Eila and Irvine Heber Green (1913–1997) in September that year published Comment, sometimes subtitled "A Journal of Poetry, Art, Literature and Social Comment" and soon retitled aCOMMENT; the title set thus on each cover, with a small lower-case 'a' embedded within, most frequently, the all-capitals word 'COMMENT'.

It appeared one month before its better known contemporary, Angry Penguins, with which it shared many of its contributors, and which it outlived by a year. The mainstream press was slow to report its existence. In October 1941 Perth's Daily News cast the first stones, especially at its design, the reviewer having received a

"gift of some copies of a queer (to me) little publication, 'a comment,' produced in Melbourne. It is a manifestation of the revolt of some young persons against the order of things accepted by the great majority, as surrealism is in the field of pictorial art. Making a bold bid for freedom 'a comment' will have no truck with capital letters, and the arch rebels among its contributors scorn punctuation."

The Sydney Morning Herald rated it "the most suavely produced – on brown paper with Cairo type – [...] sophisticated man-about-town (and lately somewhat in need of cash) of the literary journals," while The Age newspaper article about the January 1945 issue was headed "High-brows Only";

"Readers of modern literature, of the experimental kind, may like to know about A Comment...It is an attractive little magazine, if you like this sort of thing...A comment on Angry Adelaide with a plea for freedom of expression, a fine poem by Alec King, and one or two indifferent lino cuts make up the staple of this number. For those interested, it is well worth the price. Those who like the orthodox are urged to stick to their accustomed periodical literature."

The Sydney Jewish News columnist George M. Berger, having himself contributed to the magazine, noted that "among...the magazine’s principal contributors, are at least two Jews, Max Harris and Karl Shapiro," and was less equivocal in praise;

"Since the publication of “Art in Australia” had to cease because of paper-shortage, A Comment, has become the only Australian periodical of progressive literary design. It is aptly illustrated by linocuts and photo-studies by contemporary artists such as Menkhorst and Irvine Green. Its publisher can be congratulated upon the magazine’s value as a mouth piece and forum of progressive endeavour, and should be encouraged by greater publicity for her efforts."

In his memoir of the period, contributor to the magazine Alister Kershaw remarks on;

"...the dispiriting atmosphere prevailing when Cecily Crozier took it into her head to launch her Comment. She must have been raving mad. I've been delicately hinting that there was never a good moment at which to start a highbrow magazine but Cecily chose the very worst...in wartime it seems to be generally agreed that there's something unpatriotic, something downright subversive, about any cultural activity other than painting portraits of generals or writing dispatches as a war correspondent. To her credit, Cecily didn't give a hoot for whatever tut-tutting disapproval she may have encountered but she must have felt tempted on occasion to call the whole harebrained enterprise off when she came up against the material difficulties involved. For another wartime phenomenon is that, within minutes of hostilities breaking out, everything, from bootlaces to wheelbarrows, and everybody, from circus acrobats to monumental masons, virtually disappear overnight. When Comment came in to existence there was a shortage a of printers and a shortage of type, a shortage of staples, a shortage, for all I know, of ink. And, first and foremost, there was a shortage of paper."

Victoria Perin notes that Crozier was among a number of women during WW2 who valiantly nurtured and maintained the still nascent modernist art and culture of Australia.

== Format and distribution ==
The magazine's editing was carried out at Crozier's home at 42 Bourke Road, Oakleigh. Due to the wartime shortages the magazine was printed on 23 cm brown wrapping paper by Bradley Printers of 40 Glenferrie Road, Malvern, and set in the Cairo typeface. Issues of 8–30 pages appeared irregularly; nominally quarterly, apart from a double number 9 & 10 (Jan. 1942) titled A new year comment. The cover price was sixpence (1940–1942); one shilling (1943); rising to one shilling and sixpence (1944–1947). It was available by subscription; in one editorial Crozier boasts 300 subscribers. It also sold in Sydney, where artists Carl Plate and James Gleeson distributed it, and in Melbourne at Gino Nibbi's Leonardo Art Shop, 166 Little Collins Street, near the “Paris End” of Collins Street, an outlet for international magazines such as Minotaure and transition, and during the 1930s and 40s inspired a Melbourne avant-garde. The covers, mostly linocuts by William Constable, Robert Miller, Irvine Green, Decima McColl, Eric Thake and others, austererly printed in only one or two colours, declared its Modernist ethos.

== Content ==
aCOMMENT promoted experimental, often surrealist, writing and art, publishing the work of some of Australia's most prominent modernists of the 1940s. The first number of Comment declared; "Our aim is stimulation...we will extract from the surrounding gloom a few people who will be really interested in our effort to put into print the newest ideas in writing and design." In issue four Crozier challenges her readers: “Why not let Comment be the battle ground upon which YOU will fight for your ideals and ideas.” The last issue, Winter 1947 featured Max Harris, Irvine Green, and Karl Shapiro; there is a two-page review of Shapiro's The Place of Love by Harris; Louis Thomas Dimes' three-page article under the pseudonym 'l'homme qui rit'; Joseph O'Dwyer; and Parker Tyler. The poetry supplement contains works by James Gleeson ('Orchestration'), Geoffrey Dutten [sic], Joy Hester, Shapiro and Dimes.

== Contributors ==
Cecily Crozier was its editor (though Kershaw records that "at one point she furnished an editorial which specifically stated that there was no editor",) and also wrote for the magazine, while Irvine Green was its designer and illustrator, photographer and a contributing writer. Though he joined the RAAF and was posted in aerial reconnaissance he contributed woodcuts and linocuts for most of the covers and his illustrations, and occasionally his tipped-in photographs, appear regularly in aCOMMENT until its demise after 26 issues in 1947. He and Crozier married in July 1941 but soon separated.

- James Gleeson
- Alec King
- Arthur Ashworth
- Albert Tucker
- Michael Keon
- Muir Holburn
- Max Harris
- Adrian Lawlor
- Alister Kershaw

American contributors to the magazine were servicemen stationed in New Guinea during the war who took their recreation leave in Australia; Karl Shapiro, author of the autobiographical Younger Son; Harry Roskolenko (Baedecker of a Bachelor and The Terrorized), and also William Van O'Connor, who after the war, on a Rockefeller Foundation Fellowship, wrote Sense and Sensibility in Modern Poetry published in 1948. Shapiro enthused about the magazine; "A COMMENT should be shown in America. It is brave and good—as good as our best—and really a signpost in a world of destroyed art”

== Demise ==
aCOMMENT ran at a loss, with costs often met by Crozier and Green, until it was forced to fold after the Winter issue of 1947 in which Crozier wrote;

“Dear Readers, This will probably be the last Comment for a considerable time. The subscriptions I asked for some time ago have never materialised, as I’m afraid I hoped and expected. May l say once again that Comment has always been run on subscriptions, with the always large deficit made up from either Irvine Green’s pocket or my own...I need 150 subscriptions to bring Comment out four times a year. Believe me, my faithful readers, I have lived with Comment for seven years and the situation desolates me, but with so many little magazines the rocks of disaster always loom close.”

Writing in 1955 John Tregenza noted that "Of the thirty-seven little magazines published in Australia since 1923, only five succeeded in lasting for more than ten issues," and of aCOMMENT notes its success in that it "had managed to avoid the rocks for an exceptionally long time — for seven years and 25 [sic] issues."

== Legacy ==
Max Delany, director, Monash University Museum of Art in an essay on art magazines writes that;

Comment sought to express the feelings and sensuality of a new generation of artists and thinkers, and, in Max Harris’ words, to ‘be at one with the surrealists and revolutionaries in defeating a moral system and a moral society which expresses the victory of death [and] the corruption of desire...’.
