= Klaxon (magazine) =

Brazilian magazine (1922–1923)

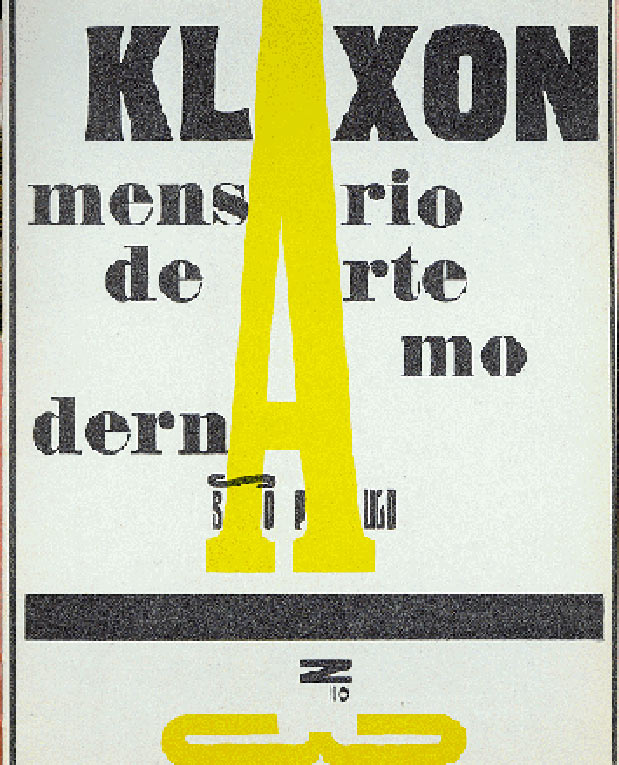
Cover of Klaxon nº3 (August 1922)

Klaxon - mensario de arte moderna (Klaxon - modern art monthly) was a Brazilian avant-garde visual art and literary magazine, which ran from 15 May 1922 to January 1923. The publication was the main divulgator of the Brazilian Modernism, after the Modern Art Week held in São Paulo.

Klaxon lasted for nine issues, and had among its collaborators Mário de Andrade, Oswald de Andrade, Di Cavalcanti, Tarsila do Amaral, Anita Malfatti, Menotti Del Picchia and other artists. Although not explicitally stated, Mario de Andrade was the magazine director and leader.

In 2013, the complete editions of Klaxon were collected in a book by the publishing house Cosac Naify and São Paulo’s ICCo (Instituto de Cultura Contemporânea).
