= Dau al Set =

First post-WWII Catalan artistic movement

Dau al Set (Catalan pronunciation: [ˈdaw əl ˈsɛt]), the first post-World War II artistic movement in Spain, was founded in Barcelona in September 1948 by poet Joan Brossa. The movement, best known for translating the conscious and unconscious mind into art, was heavily influenced by both the Surrealist and Dadaist movements. In Catalan Dau al Set means "the seventh face of the dice", which expresses the movement's rupturist character.

== History ==
Dau al Set first began as an avant-garde artistic collective led by Joan Brossa, a Catalan poet, in September 1948. Joan Brossa established the group in response to the period's conservative reigning government, which gained power after the Spanish Civil War known as the "Guerra Civil". Under the new Spanish State, Francisco Franco radically changed many areas of the previous culture. One such example was the Spanish art community as seen in art and culture in Francoist Spain. During this time counterculture movements in Catalonia and Spain in general came to an abrupt halt. Such artistic groups were replaced with Nationalist Francoist Art, which often functioned as a means for government endorsement and propaganda. In an attempt to revive the avant-garde scene in Spain Dau al Set was formed.

In 1949, with help from Joan-Josep Tharrats's private printing press, Dau al Set published its first self-entitled magazine journal. The majority of the publication was written in Catalan, a language prohibited in Francoist Spain. Dau al Set typically ran a print between one hundred and two hundred copies, consisting of four to twelve pages. The magazine journal was delivered throughout Barcelona to those with subscriptions and served a niche population at the time. The format of the magazine was 22.5 cm x 18.7 cm in the broadsheet style and never bound. These publications continued on a regular basis until the end of 1951 at which point Dau al Set began to dissolve.

In 1952, Dau al Set founding member Antoni Tàpies left the group to promote his own independent work in the Surrealist and Informal art styles. The following year Joan Ponç left to Brazil to continue to paint and spread his unique style. And one year later Modest Cuixart left the group as well. During this time from 1953 till 1956 Dau al Set continued to be created and published by Joan-Josep Tharrats. During the final years the magazine decreased from an issue a month to an issue every season to then two issues a year. The final issue was created and distributed in 1956.

== Style ==
Initially, Dau al Set began as an offshoot of Surrealism, but slowly grew into a distinct style with many existing components. One such component began with the incorporation of the surrealist world of dreams, where in Dau al Set expands upon by combing scientific and philosophical articles with magical undertones derived from Joan Brossa's personalized style. The use of magical elements pervaded throughout the entire movement to showcase an esoteric world of inner exploration. While magic was seen consistently the different members each contributed a unique style to Dau al Set. One of the most drastic was the contributions from Joan Ponç. Ponç's art frequently contained demonic images actualized with a series of different monsters throughout the work. In contrast, Modest Cuixart's work often contained images of fantasy influenced by German expressionism and Joan Miró. Finally, Antoni Tápies often emulated the style of Paul Klee with obscure images surrounded by a dark atmosphere and phosphorescent lighting. With the base of magical elements these three unique techniques joined to create the style seen in the Dau al Set movement.

== Influences ==
Dau al Set was heavily influenced by two movements before its creation, those two being Dadaism and Surrealism. Dadaism was a European art movement in the early 20th century which focused on the avant-garde. This style was meant to fight against the upper class in society with the belief that their reason and logic were the cause of war. With an anti-reason and anti-logic sentiment most of the works of art often contained elements of chaos and irrationality. Dadaist art also utilized the following techniques of cubism, collages, cut-up technique, photomontages, and assemblage which can be seen in Dau al Set's work. From this movement spawned the pre-war avant-garde which was the community Dau al Set were trying to revive. Some influential artists on Dau al Set from this movement are Francis Picabia and Max Ernst.

Another influence on Dau al Set was Surrealism, a cultural movement greatly influenced by Dadaism, which began in the 1920s. This style was often considered a portrayal of the dream world; a reality which existed right below everyday life. It also had a large political focus which was often used to contradict a given community's social norms often imposed by the bourgeois. Some artists from this movement that influenced Dau al Set were Joan Miró, Paul Klee, Josep Vicenç Foix, and Salvador Dalí. Other methods that were influenced was the idea of magical aspects that were often seen in the dream world surrealism created. However, in Dau al Set these magical aspects were developed and expounded upon.

== Members ==
There were six founding members of Dau al Set including a poet Joan Brossa, a philosopher Arnau Puig, three artists Joan Ponç, Antoni Tàpies, and Modest Cuixart, as well as a dual painter and editor Joan-Josep Tharrats.

Over the years Dau al Set ran there were occasional contributors, such as Juan Eduardo Cirlot, Antonio Saura, Enrique Tábara, and Manolo Millares. Their contributions came often in the form of writings which helped to continued to establish Dau al Set as an intellectual piece of work.

== Exhibitions ==
Dau al Set actively participated in the exhibition at the Institut Francais and the Sala Caralt.

- December 1949, Institut Francais in Barcelona, Spain
- October 1951, Sala Caralt in Barcelona, Spain
- December 2008-January 2009 Fundacio J.V. Foix in Barcelona, Spain
- February 2009- April 2009, Fundacio Fran Daurel in Barcelona, Spain
- May 2009-June 2009, University of Cantabria in Santander, Spain
- July 2009-August 2009, Fundacion Diaz Caneja in Palencia, Spain
- August 2009- September 2009, Fundacion Antonio Perez in Cuenca, Spain
- October 2009-December 2009, Ibercaja in Zaragoza, Spain
- December 2009-January 2010, Sala de Exposiciones Vimcorsa in Cordoba, Spain
- February 2010-March 2010, Museo de Arte Contemporáneo Conde Duque in Madrid, Spain
- April 2010-May 2010, Centro Cultural de la Diputación in Ourense, Spain
- May 2010-June 2010, Sala Pescadería Vieja in Jerez de la Frontera, Spain

== Impact ==
Dau al Set has had a lasting impact throughout history the most notable being the continuation of the avant-garde in Spain throughout Francoist Spain. Moreover, Dau al Set contributed to the creation of the Informalist movement seen in Spain during the fifties. Also the magical and fantasy elements of Dau al Set was seen to later emerge again in Spain in the eighties.

This group also stood as a large influence for other artistic movements in Spain such as the Grup d’Elx and El Paso, with important artists such as Joan Castejón, Eusebio Sempere or Manolo Millares. Additionally, each of the members made their own impacts after the movement was dissolved. Most notably is Antoni Tàpies who continued with his style based heavily in surrealism and later became a notable artist for his work in Abstract art.
