= Dénia =

Dénia Denia
- City and municipality
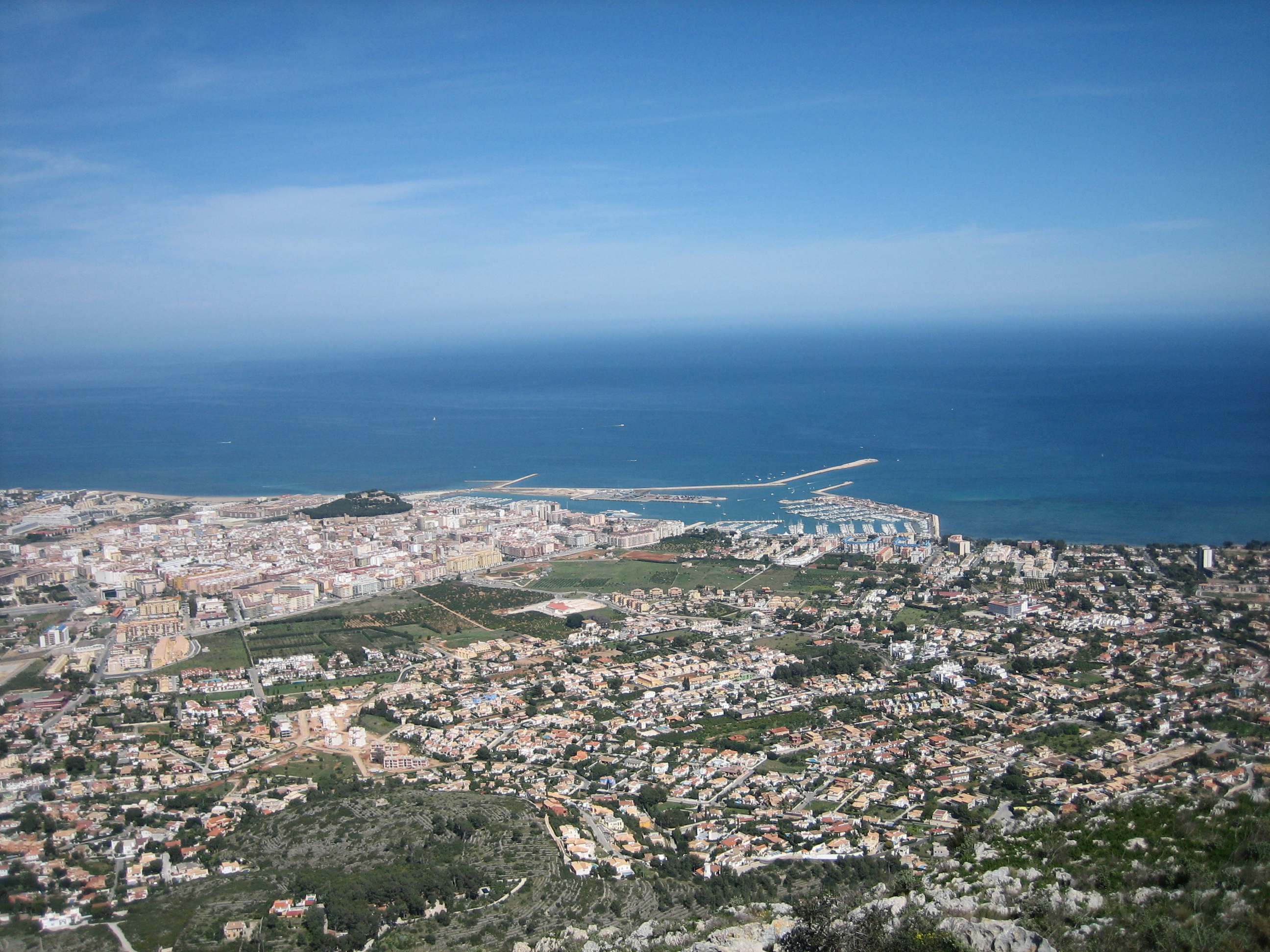
- View of Dénia from the Montgó out to sea

- Flag Coat of arms
- Interactive map of Dénia
- Location within Province of Alicante Location within Valencian Community Location within Spain
- Coordinates: 38°50′40″N 0°6′40″E
- Country: Spain
- Autonomous community: Valencian Community
- Province: Alicante
- Comarca: Marina Alta
- Judicial district: Dénia

Government
  - Alcalde (Mayor): Rafa Carrió (Compromís)

Area
  - Total: 66.2 km^{2} (25.6 sq mi)
- Elevation: 22 m (72 ft)

Population (2025-01-01)
  - Total: 47,261
  - Density: 714/km^{2} (1,850/sq mi)
- Demonyms: Dénian • denier, -a (Val.) • dianense (Sp.)
- Official language(s): Valencian; Spanish
- Linguistic area: Valencian
- Time zone: UTC+1 (CET)
  - Summer (DST): UTC+2 (CEST)
- Postal code: 03700
- Website: Official website

Dénia, (Note: Pronunciation of Dénia: Valencian: [ˈdenia]) in Valencian, spelled Denia in Spanish, (Note: Pronunciation of Denia (unofficial): Spanish: [ˈdenja]) is a historical coastal city and municipality in the province of Alicante, Spain, on the Costa Blanca halfway between Alicante and Valencia, and the capital and judicial seat of the comarca of Marina Alta. Dénia's historical heritage has been influenced by Iberian, Greek, Roman, Islamic, Napoleonic and Christian civilizations. As of 2025, it had a population of 47,261, although this is more than doubled by tourism during the summer months. The city's official population count as of May 2026, including foreigners who have registered as inhabitants, is 50,591.

== History ==
There is evidence of human habitation in the area since prehistoric times and there are significant Iberian ruins on the hillsides nearby. In the 4th century BC it was a Greek colony of Massalia or Emporion, perhaps the one mentioned by Strabo as Hēmeroskopeion (Ancient Greek: Ἡμεροσκοπεῖον) (meaning "watchtower"). It was an ally of Rome during the Punic Wars, and later was absorbed into the Roman Empire under the name of Dianium (after their goddess Diana). In the 1st century BC Quintus Sertorius established a Roman naval base here.

From 636–696, under Visigothic rule, it was the seat of a bishop subordinate to Toledo. After the Muslim conquest of Iberia and the dissolution of the Caliphate of Córdoba, Dénia (Arabic: دانية, Dāniyya) became the capital of a Taifa kingdom that reigned over part of the Valencian coast and Ibiza. Slavic Muslim slaves, saqālibah, led by Mujahid ibn Yusuf ibn Ali, profited from the progressive crumbling of the Caliphate's superstructure to gain control over the province of Dénia. The saqālibah managed to free themselves and run the kingdom, which extended its reach as far as the islands of Mallorca and its capital Madinah Mayurqah. The saqālibah taifa lost its independence in 1076, when it was captured by Ahmad al-Muqtadir, lord of Zaragoza, under which it remained until the Almoravid invasion in 1091. The Muslim Arabs originally built the castle fortress, and the French, who occupied the city for four years during the Peninsular War, rebuilt it in the early 19th century.

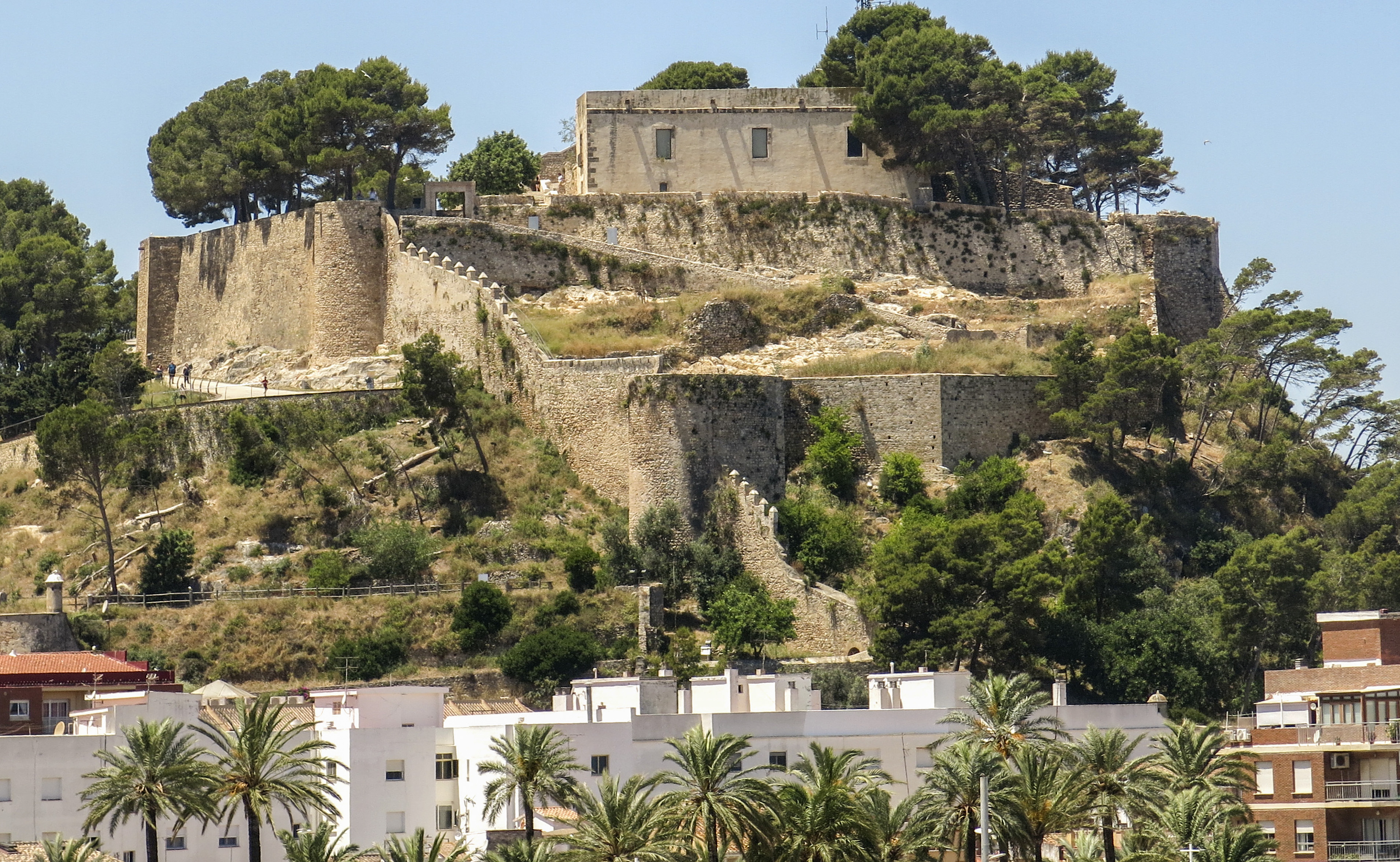
Castle de Dénia

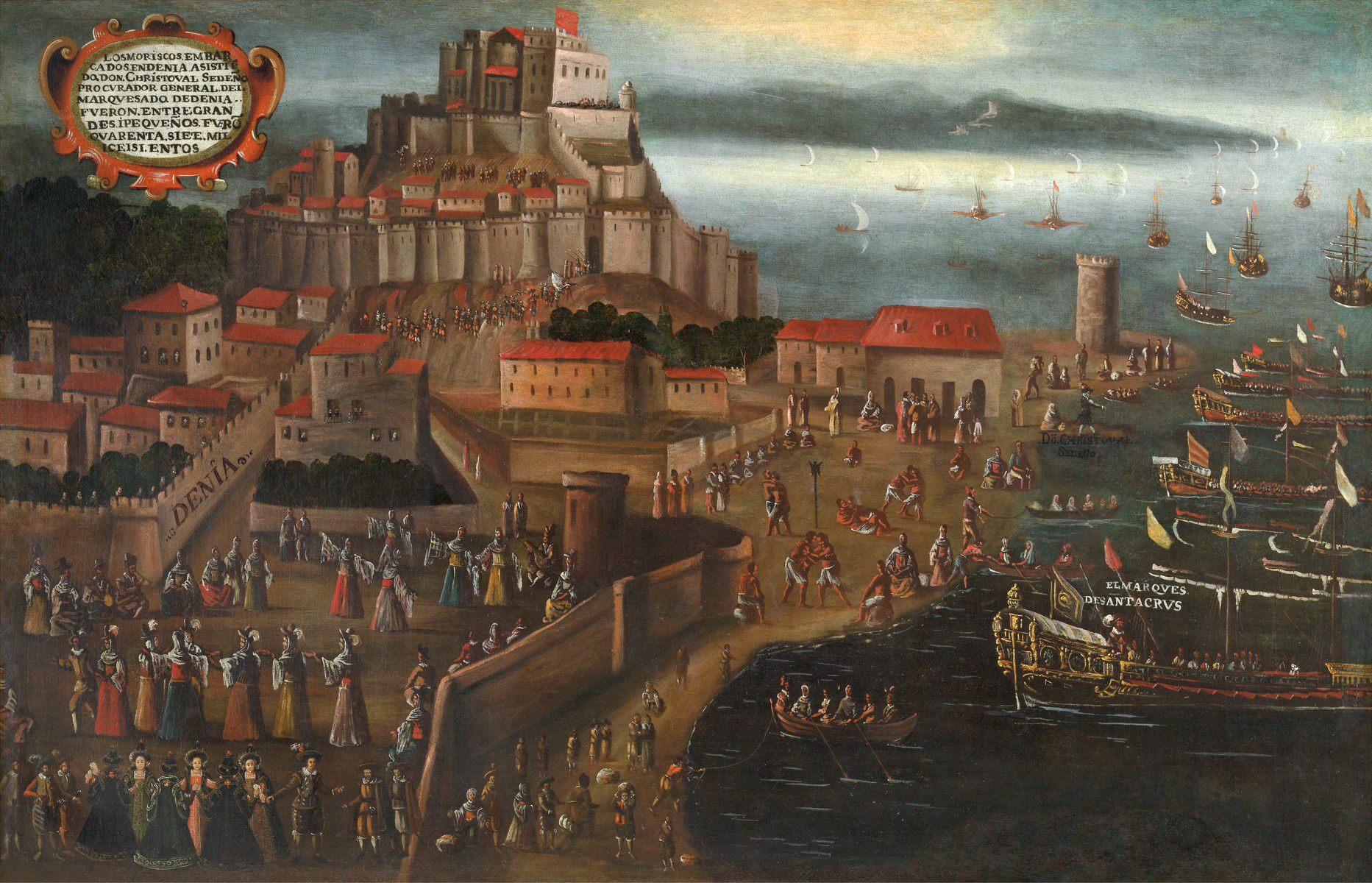
1609 Expulsion of the Moriscos at the port of Dénia, by Vincente Mostre

The town was conquered by the Christians in 1244. This caused a decline for the city, which remained nearly uninhabited after the exile of most of the Muslim population. It was later repopulated by the Valencian government. Created a fief in 1298, it was held by the de Sandoval family from 1431, although the city itself was returned to the Aragonese crown in 1455. A marquisate from 1487, Dénia gained many privileges thanks to Francisco Gómez de Sandoval y Rojas, Duke of Lerma, a favourite of Philip III of Spain. It suffered a further period of decay after the decree of Expulsion of the Moriscos (1609), by which 25,000 people left the marquisate, leaving the local economy in a dismal state.

During the War of the Spanish Succession Dénia was besieged by 9,000 French troops in June 1707, who broke down several sections of the town walls using cannon, but their attacks in July were repulsed by the small garrison with great loss of life to the attackers resulting in the siege being raised after 27 days. Dénia, however, fell to the French forces that November. In 1713 the Treaty of Utrecht recognised Louis XIV's grandson Philip, Duke of Anjou, as King of Spain (as Philip V), so returning Dénia to Spanish rule.

It was reacquired by the Spanish crown in 1803, after which Denia gained an increasingly important role as a trading port. A community of English raisin traders lived in Denia from 1800 until the time of the Spanish Civil War in the late 1930s.

== Main sights ==
Dénia is home to a large Moorish castle named Castle of Dénia on a rocky crag overlooking the city. It was built in the 11th and 12th century and offers views around the sea, the city and the surrounding area. Located in the castle is the Palau del Governador and its corresponding museum.

Dénia also has the Museu Etnològic with further details on the history and culture of the city.

- Route of the Valencian classics

== Climate ==
Dénia has a Mediterranean climate (Köppen Csa), with mild winters and hot summers. The average annual temperature surpasses 18 °C (64 °F) and the rainfall amount is around 750 millimetres (30 in). The mean temperature of the coldest month (January) is around 12 °C (54 °F), while the mean of the hottest month (August) is around 26 °C (79 °F). Autumn is by far the wettest season, receiving more than 300 millimetres (12 in) of rainfall, mostly falling in few days but with heavy rainfalls, a phenomenon called cold drop in Spain that is very common on the Valencian coast. Both September and October receive more than 100 millimetres (3.9 in) of rainfall while November receives close to 100mm as well. Summer is the driest season, but not rainless, as on average, it receives around 70 to 80 millimetres (2.8 to 3.1 in) although July is almost rainless as on average it receives under 5 millimetres (0.20 in) of rain, being the sunniest month as well. Storms are common in Autumn, averaging about 15 stormy days per year. The city enjoys around 2750 sunshine hours per year.

Climate data for Dénia, Spain
Month	Jan	Feb	Mar	Apr	May	Jun	Jul	Aug	Sep	Oct	Nov	Dec	Year
Mean daily maximum °C (°F)	17 (63)	17 (63)	19 (66)	21 (70)	24 (75)	28 (82)	30 (86)	31 (88)	29 (84)	25 (77)	20 (68)	18 (64)	23 (74)
Mean daily minimum °C (°F)	7 (45)	8 (46)	9 (48)	11 (52)	14 (57)	18 (64)	21 (70)	22 (72)	19 (66)	15 (59)	10 (50)	8 (46)	14 (56)
Source: Weather2

== Transport ==
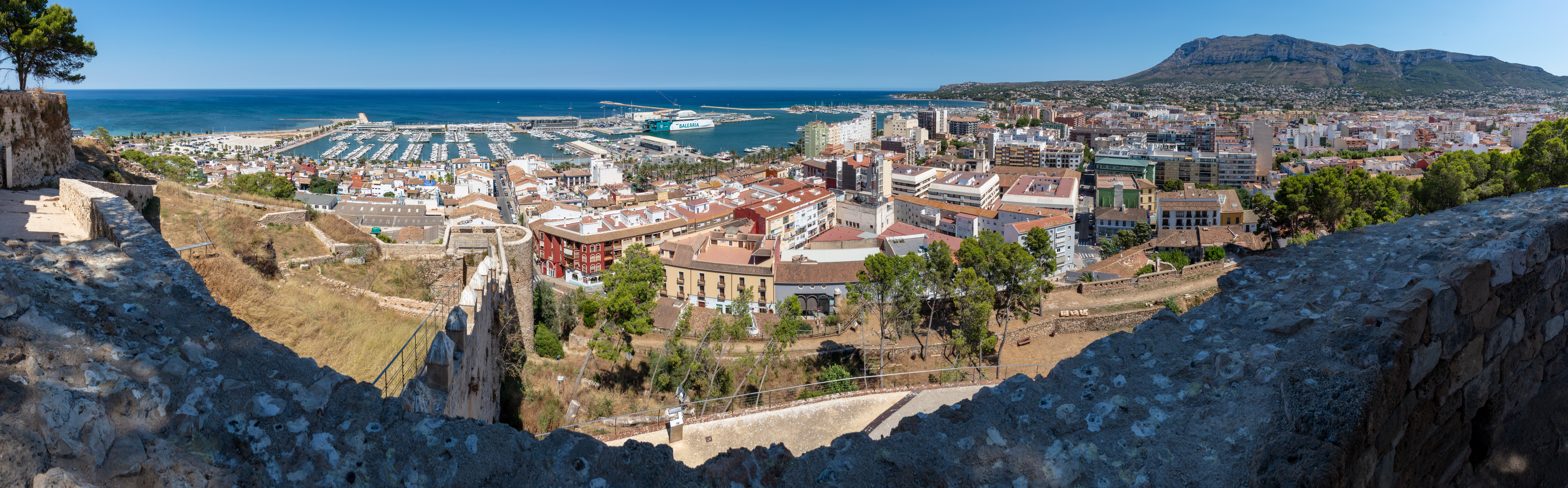
View of Dénia from the castle

Baleària operates daily ferry service from Dénia to Ibiza and the other Balearic Islands. Dénia is the closest Spanish mainland city to Ibiza.

The city also serves as the northern terminus for a 1,000 mm (3 ft 3 3/8 in) metre gauge railway line through the mountains from Alicante (popularly known as the Limón Express), run by FGV. This is not a specific tourist railway; it provides transport throughout the year and is geared to commuter use.

Connections by ALSA bus are also available to major cities Benidorm and Alicante to the south, and to Gandia and Valencia to the north.

Dénia is accessible by car from the AP-7 motorway and N-332 national road, which lie several kilometers due west of the city.

== Economy ==
The head office of Baleària is in Dénia.

== Culture ==
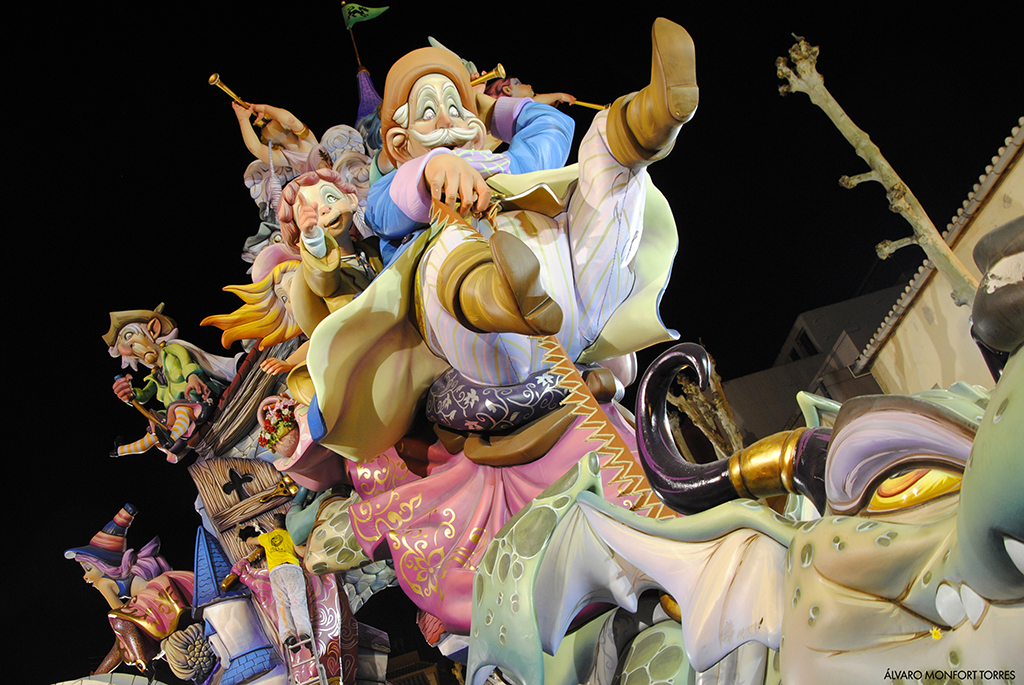
Falla

The Fallas festival is celebrated each year from 14 to 19 March. As done in major cities throughout the Valencian Community, huge papier-mâché statues called fallas are set up throughout the town, are awarded both overall and category prizes, and then set ablaze on the last night of the celebration in reverse order of their overall finish. Dénia has 11 "falla districtes": Baix La Mar, Campaments, Centro, Darrere de Castell, Diana, Les Roques, Nou Camp Roig, Oeste, París-Pedrera, Port-Rotes, and Saladar. Each district constructs both an adult and children's falla. Districts compete in the "Especial" or the "Primera" categories, depending upon how much is allocated for the construction of each falla.

Dénia's Festa Major, its main annual festival, is held in July for ten days around the Dia de la Santíssima Sang, or Day of the Holy Blood. During this festival, the Bous a la Mar (meaning "Bulls at the Sea") is held on several days, during which bulls run down the main street Marqués de Campo, only to be chased into the Mediterranean sea by men who enter a makeshift bull ring with them. The event attracts criticism from animal rights groups.

Dénia holds two major multi-day observances related to Moros y Cristianos: a mid-year festival on the second week of February, and the main celebration on the second week of August. The city has 18 filaes representing each historical side of the conflict.

Since 1974, Dénia has been home to painter and sculptor Joan Castejón. The town honored him as an Adoptive Son of Dénia in 1999.

Since 2015, Dénia has been an UNESCO Creative City of Gastronomy. The celebrity chef Quique Dacosta has his namesake 3-star Michelin and 3-sun Repsol Guide restaurant in the Las Marinas area of the city. The 1-star Michelin and 2-sun Repsol restaurant Peix y Brases is also in Dénia. Beyond these distinctions, the city also has two Michelin Guide recommended restaurants (Toy, El Carreter), two one-sun Repsol restaurants (Dexcaro, El Baret de Miquel), and eight Repsol Guide recommended restaurants (Aticcook, Casa Federico, El Faralló, El Raset, Pont Sec, Venta de Posa, Nomada, El Pegolí). The annual D*na Festival is the city's annual gastronomic fair, held annually on the last weekend of September at the Marineta Cassiana boardwalk.

== Notable people ==
- Abu al-Salt, Andalusian polymath
- Al-Dani, Andalusian jurist and qari.
- Joan Castejón, sculptor
- Marta García, racing driver
- Alberto Sols García, biochemist
- Pepelu, footballer for Valencia CF
- Gerhard Bremer, SS Convicted War Criminal

== Sports ==
Dénia's local football team is called Club Deportivo Dénia, and plays at the seventh level in Spain's pyramid, the Lliga Primera FFCV.

Dénia's local basketball team is called Dénia Basquet, and plays at the fourth level in Spain's pyramid, in the Tercera FEB, having been promoted as runners-up of the Liga Foster's Hollywood Primera División Masculina in the 2025-2026 season.

== Twin towns ==
- Cholet, France

== See also ==
- Taifa of Dénia
