= Grup d'Elx =

Spanish artistic movement

Grup d'Elx, one of the post-World War II artistic movement in Valencia, was founded in Elche in October 1967 by poet Vicente Aguilera Cerní. The avant-garde group had connections to the Surrealist and Social realism movements and stressed the importance of both the human being and its social entourage.

== History ==
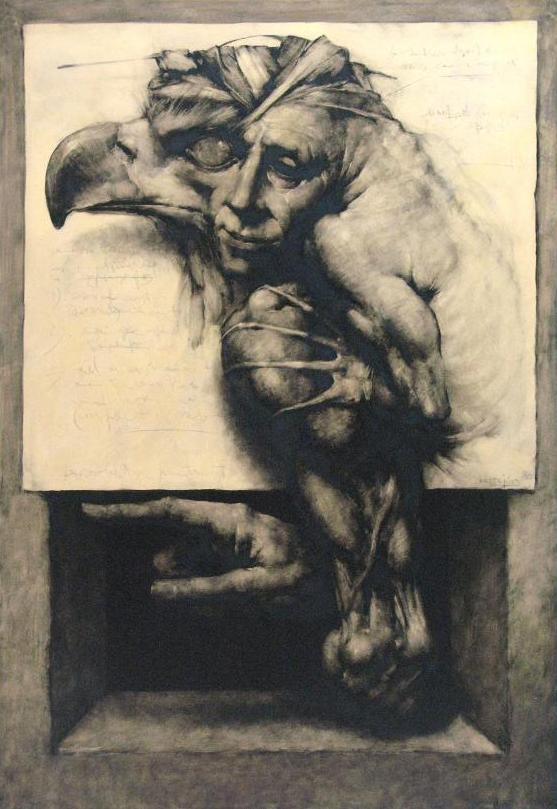
'Mutant eagle', wax on paper, by Joan Castejon.

The Grup d' Elx artists began their training in a precarious artistic scenario. Its activity was a task that built a bridge between modernity and vertebrate and radical vanguard, which for them was inseparable from a social transition out of Francoist Spain. In this sense, as the members of El Paso or Dau al set, the artists of the Grup d' Elx conducted an art in which there are several components that are part of a common denominator: the primacy of intense expressiveness, intentional reduction of color to a minimum and, finally, the belief in an artistic poetics of engagement centered on human beings and their social situation. In fact, one of its most representative members, Joan Castejón, was imprisoned for four years.

The group was inspired by the activity of other postwar artistic groups such as Dau al Set and Grup Parpalló. Members of Grup d'Elx included Joan Castejón, Albert Agulló, Antoni Coll y Sixto Marco.

The group dissolved in 1973.

== See also ==
- Joan Castejón
- Dau al set
- Surrealism
- Social realism
