= Lemon Express =

Spanish tourist train (1971–2005)

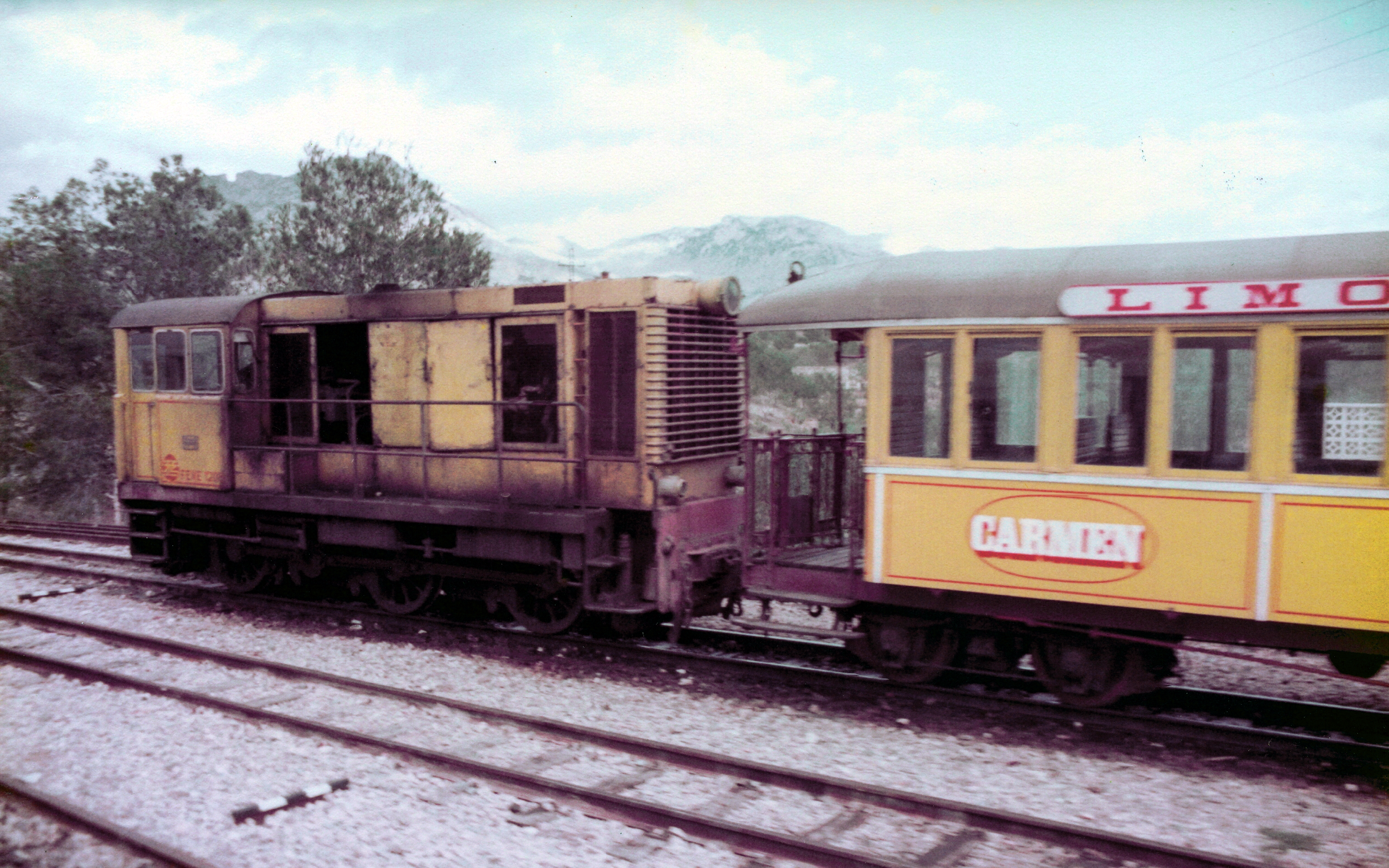
- A Batignolles locomotive leading the Lemon Express at Benidorm during Era I, November 1984

Overview
- Service type: Tourist train
- Status: Abandoned
- Locale: Costa Blanca
- First service: June 1, 1971
- Last service: May 27, 2005
- Former operators: David A. G. Simpson; Rudy Meyers

Route
- Termini: Gata de Gorgos; Benidorm
- Stops: 12
- Distance travelled: 40 km (25 mi)
- Average journey time: 1 hour, 20 minutes
- Line used: Alicante-Dénia railroad line

Technical
- Rolling stock: 10 CC-100 passenger carriages 2 ZZ-200 lounge carriages 3 FEVE 1200 series Batignolles diesel-hydraulic locomotives (1971–1988); 3 FEVE 1000 series Alstom diesel-electric locomotives (1988–2005)
- Track gauge: 1,000 mm (3 ft 3 3/8 in)
- Operating speed: 35 km/h (22 mph) (Benidorm–Garganes); 30 km/h (19 mph) (Garganes–Gata de Gorgos)

The Lemon Express (also known as the Limón Express; Spanish: Limón Exprés) was a Spanish tourist train, which ran from Benidorm to Gata de Gorgos on the Alicante–Dénia railroad line from June 1, 1971 to May 27, 2005. The train was created after an agreement between FEVE and the British tourist promoter David A. G. Simpson, who would run the trains. FEVE owned the railroad line from 1971 to 1987, and the trains consisted of FEVE 1200 series Batignolles locomotives with yellow carriages. In 1987, the railroad line transferred from FEVE to the FGV, and Rudy Meyers—who originally worked as a guide and bartender—ran the trains. From 1988 to 2005, the trains consisted of FEVE 1000 series Alstom locomotives with green-white and brown-white carriages. In 2005, the train ceased its operations.

== Background ==
The Alicante–Dénia railroad line was a meter-gauge railroad line in Spain. The line from Alicante to Altea was inaugurated on October 24, 1914, and the line from Altea to Dénia was inaugurated on July 11, 1915. The 92.7-kilometer (57.6 mi) railroad line was owned by the Compañía de los Ferrocarriles Estratégicos y Secundarios de Alicante (ESA). The Alicante–Dénia line was part of a 350-kilometer (220 mi) meter-gauge railroad network spanning the Spanish provinces of Murcia, Alicante, and Valencia. The network also included the Carcaixent–Dénia railroad line, the Alcoy–Gandía railroad line, and the Villena–Alcoy–Yecla railroad line.

The Alicante–Dénia railroad line was successful in delivering goods and passengers between the termini and the intermediate stops in Benidorm, Altea, and Calpe. From the 1940s to the 1950s, the transport of goods on meter-gauge railroads declined, and on August 1, 1964, ESA disappeared when the line's ownership was switched to the Explotación de Ferrocarriles por el Estado (EFE), which became the Ferrocarriles de Vía Estrecha (FEVE). The Carcaixent-Dénia, Alcoy-Gandía, and Villena-Alcoy-Yecla railroad lines closed down, and passenger services were replaced by road transportation; only the Alicante–Dénia railroad line remained in service.

== History ==
=== Era I (1971–1987) ===
The Lemon Express was created in 1971 by David A. G. Simpson, a British tourist promoter who was living in Benidorm. Simpson had the idea of a tourist train when he saw disused passenger carriages at Benidorm station on the closed Carcaixent-Dénia railroad line. He would propose the idea to FEVE; the disused locomotives and carriages were in an acceptable condition, and FEVE decided to cover the cost of converting the rolling stock into a tourist train.

The railroad had twelve wooden carriages; ten were passenger carriages, numbered CC-101 through CC-110, and two were lounge carriages, numbered ZZ-201 through ZZ-202. The carriages were built in Beasain in 1932 and used on the Carcaixent-Dénia railroad line. The carriages were repainted in a lemon yellow; Simpson had stated that he was inspired to repaint the carriages after the abundance of lemon trees he had seen in Benidorm and Sierra de Bernia. All of the carriages received signs, reading "Limón Exprés", and were given feminine names to attract tourists. (Note: The names of the carriages were Rosa, María, Isabel, Alicia, Carmen, Sofía, Luisa, Elena, Silvia, Emilia, Nuria, and Marina.)

In addition to the carriages, the railroad originally had three 0-6-0DH FEVE 1200 series locomotives to pull the train, numbered 1203, 1206, and 1208. The locomotives were commonly nicknamed Batignolles. The three locomotives were built in 1959 by Construcciones y Auxiliar de Ferrocarriles in Beasain, as well as Batignolles. The locomotives also worked on the Carcaixent–Dénia railroad line, as well as the Madrid–Almorox railroad line. The locomotives had been left at a station at La Marina. The locomotives were moved to the railroad in 1971, and repainted yellow and red to match with the carriages. Simpson originally intended to use steam locomotives for the train, but no steam locomotives were available at the time.

On June 1, 1971, Simpson ran the Lemon Express on its inaugural run. The train—led by Batignolles locomotive 1208—left Alicante at 9:50 UTC+1, and arrived at Dénia at 13:32 UTC+1; on the return trip, the train remained in Benidorm to begin service. The route was finalized between Benidorm and Gata de Gorgos, which was 40 kilometers (25 mi) long on the Alicante–Dénia line. The first trains consisted of one locomotive and four or five carriages. A "D" series two-axle covered goods wagon—known as a furgón—was used for storage during the first few trips, but after a few derailments, it was taken out of service and stored at a station in Benidorm.

The British newspapers Daily Mirror and Sunday Mirror had advertised the Lemon Express. Tourists from the United States, the United Kingdom, the Netherlands, and Germany rode the train. The passengers would visit several places in Gata, such as workshops for traditional basketry, or bars that served sangria and Spanish omelettes. The train also included a visit to a guitar factory; tourists would be able to take guitars home. Various genres of music played in the carriages, such as the Beatles and Manolo Escobar. The train had dining services; the waiters would be dressed in yellow, and serve sandwiches and wine.

=== Era II (1987–2005) ===
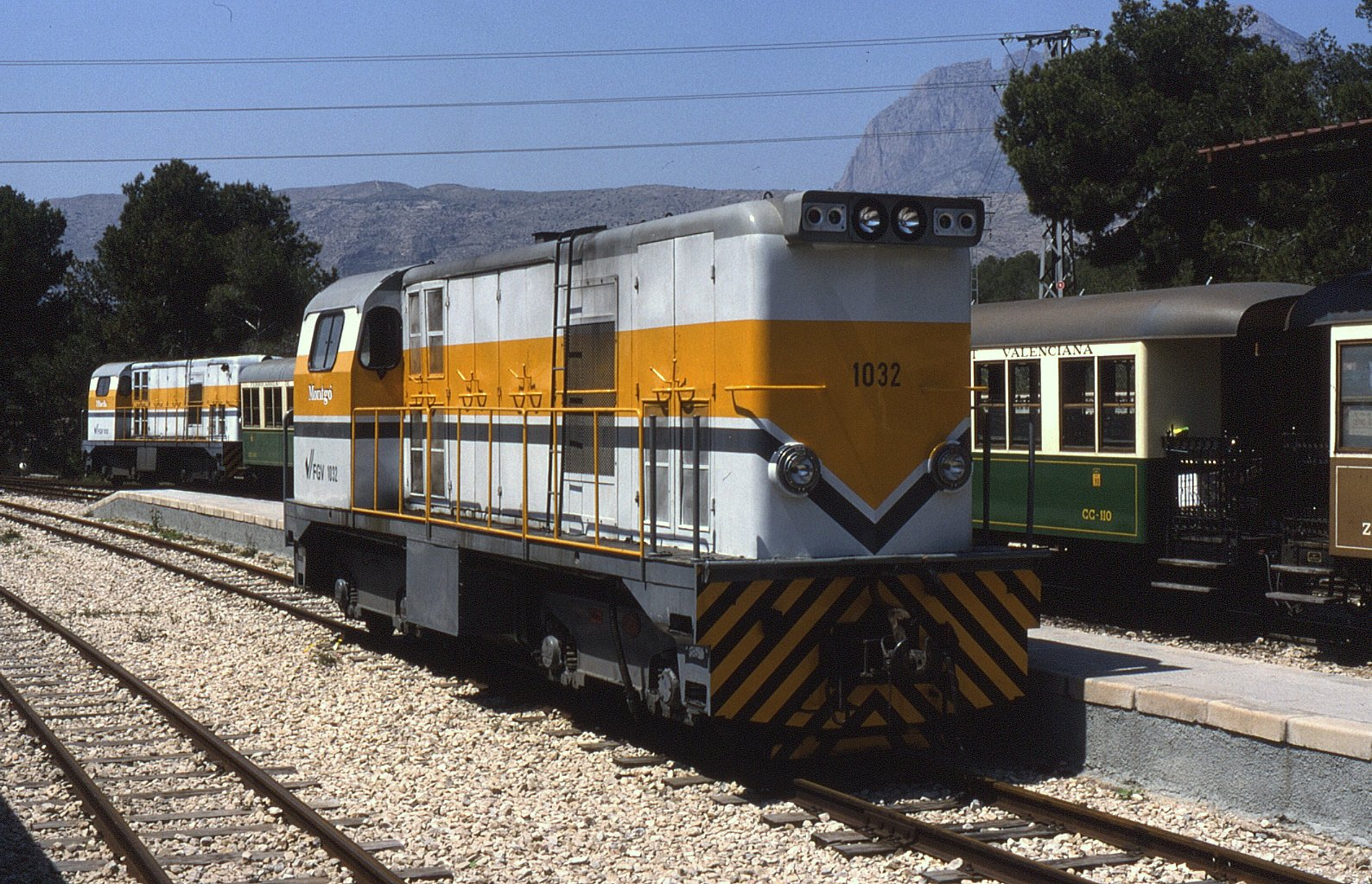
Alstom locomotives preparing the Lemon Express at Benidorm during Era II, April 1997

In 1987, the ownership of the Alicante–Dénia railroad line was transferred from FEVE to the Ferrocarrils de la Generalitat Valenciana (FGV); the FGV had been created earlier on November 20, 1986. For safety reasons, the carriages were rebuilt in September 1987 by Miró Reig, a company in Alcoy. The wooden seats were replaced with new seats, the wooden frame was rebuilt with steel, and the roof was fitted with fiberglass. The carriages also received compressed air brakes, electrical lighting, and a public address system. The ten passenger carriages were repainted in green and white; the lounge carriages fitted with a bar and tables, and were repainted brown and white, as opposed to the green and white on the rest of the carriages. The new train, with its rebuilt carriages, were inaugurated on March 28, 1988.

Rudy Meyers—a guide and bartender on the train before the ownership changed—took ownership of the train in 1988, following a meeting with the FGV. Meyers was also British, and lived in Benidorm. A man known as Andy took over Meyers's job as a guide and bartender. In addition, raffles would take place during the trip, which were managed by a man known as Paco.

In July 1988, the Batignolles locomotives were replaced by two FEVE 1000 series locomotives, numbered 1030 and 1032. The FEVE 1000 series locomotives were diesel-electric locomotives built by Alstom and Babcock & Wilcox from 1955 to 1959. The two locomotives had worked on the La Robla railway. A third 1000 series locomotive—which worked on the Santander–Bilbao Railroad, numbered 1022—was obtained in 1994. The three 1000 series locomotives were named shortly after they began service. (Note: The FEVE 1000 series locomotives were named after Spanish mountains; the names of the locomotives were Benacantil for 1022, Ifach for 1030, and Montgó for 1032.) The locomotives were also known as Alstom locomotives.

The locomotives on the train broke down on several occasions. Meyers had stated that the Batignolles locomotives were breaking down consistently, and that he was in debt as a result. Meyers negotiated with FGV to upgrade the rolling stock, which was when the carriages were upgraded and the locomotives replaced. An observer had described that a twelve-carriage train led by an Alstom locomotive was unable to climb a grade on its way to Gata during the rain; a Batignolles locomotive waiting at Gata took the train during the return trip. It was later explained that one of the traction motors on the Alstom locomotive had failed.

By 1998, Meyers had stated that the train was received well. According to Meyers, the trains were busier in the winter than in the summer; twelve-carriage trains were used during the winter, which held a capacity of 44 people per carriage. On April 28, 2001, the train ran on a special service commemorating its thirtieth anniversary. An exhibition was set up in the lobby of Alicante station, showing the history of the train, as well as various instruments used on railroads such as lanterns, flags, and whistles. Members of the Asociación Valenciana Amigos del Ferrocarril (AVAF) decorated the locomotive with flags, lemon tree branches, and palm branches.

=== Abandonment and related events (since 2005) ===
On May 27, 2005, the train ceased its operations. Meyers asked the FGV to halt the train's services following two derailments. After negotiations, the Ministry of Development awarded a contract to the FGV for repairing 24 bogies for the twelve carriages, which amounted to €960,000 (equivalent to US$1,813,291 in 2025). The bogies were changed the same year, and the train was left at a shop in La Marina for several months before being moved to a station in El Campello, where it was abandoned. The carriages with the new bogies only travelled between La Marina and El Campello.

On September 16–23, 2015, the city council of Alicante organized an event for European Mobility Week. On September 20, a ciclovía was held, with several activities being set up around it. The FGV participated by operating locomotive 1022 Benacantil and two of the Lemon Express carriages (all of which were restored by the FGV) at La Marina station; the event was the train's first service in 10 years. In June 2025, six of the twelve carriages were moved to the Consorcio del Ponfeblino, a consortium located in Villablino, with the intention of using the carriages for tourist service. The FGV had sold the six carriages to the consortium for an initial period of 10 years.
