= Troços =

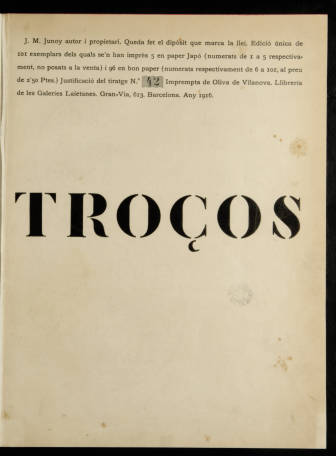
Front cover of the magazine "Troços"

Troços is an avant-garde Catalan magazine published for the first time in 1916. It was directed by Josep Maria Junoy, who was also the owner of the magazine. Only 101 copies were printed of the first edition. This number had 8 pages and the measurements were 223 x 135 mm. Its impression was a high quality one and it was done in the printing house Oliva de Vilanova. Its price was 2.50 pesetas.

One year later, in 1917, we find again the same title directed too by Josep Maria Junoy. As an exception, the number 4 of the magazine was directed by Josep Vicenç Foix. The magazine from that period had a measurement of 193 x 149 mm and it also had 8 pages. It was printed in the printing house can Galve and the editing office was in Galeries Dalmau, in the Street Portaferrissa 18 of Barcelona. The magazine had a monthly regularity but it was stopped for 4 months. Each number cost 45 cents of peseta.

== Themes and collaborators ==
Troços was dedicated to literature and art news. Josep Maria Junoy was a supporter of France (the historical context is World War I). This feeling is shown in a preliminary note he made in the magazine in which he wrote Vive le France.

In the magazine there were published translations from foreign writers like Pierre Albert-Birot, Philippe Soupault, Egio Bolongaro and Pierre Reverdy. Moreover, there were published original works by Josep Maria Junoy, Joaquim Folguera and Josep Vicenç Foix. Drawings by Albert Gleizes, Pere Ynglada, Joan Miró, Cels Lagar, Frank Burty and Enric C. Ricart were published.

The magazine Troços, although it had a short life, is a good source to learn about European Avant-gardism.
