= Sobaka (magazine) =

Sobaka magazine was an avant-garde periodical that examined and reviewed events in Third World countries but usually did not get the attention of the mainline press. Countries covered included Haiti, Asian successor states of the Soviet Union and Caucasian and Middle Eastern states. Its editors were Cali Ruchala and Mark Irkali, issuing the magazine as Diacritica Press. Seventeen issues of the periodical were published during 1998–2006.
