= Joan Ponç =

Catalan artist

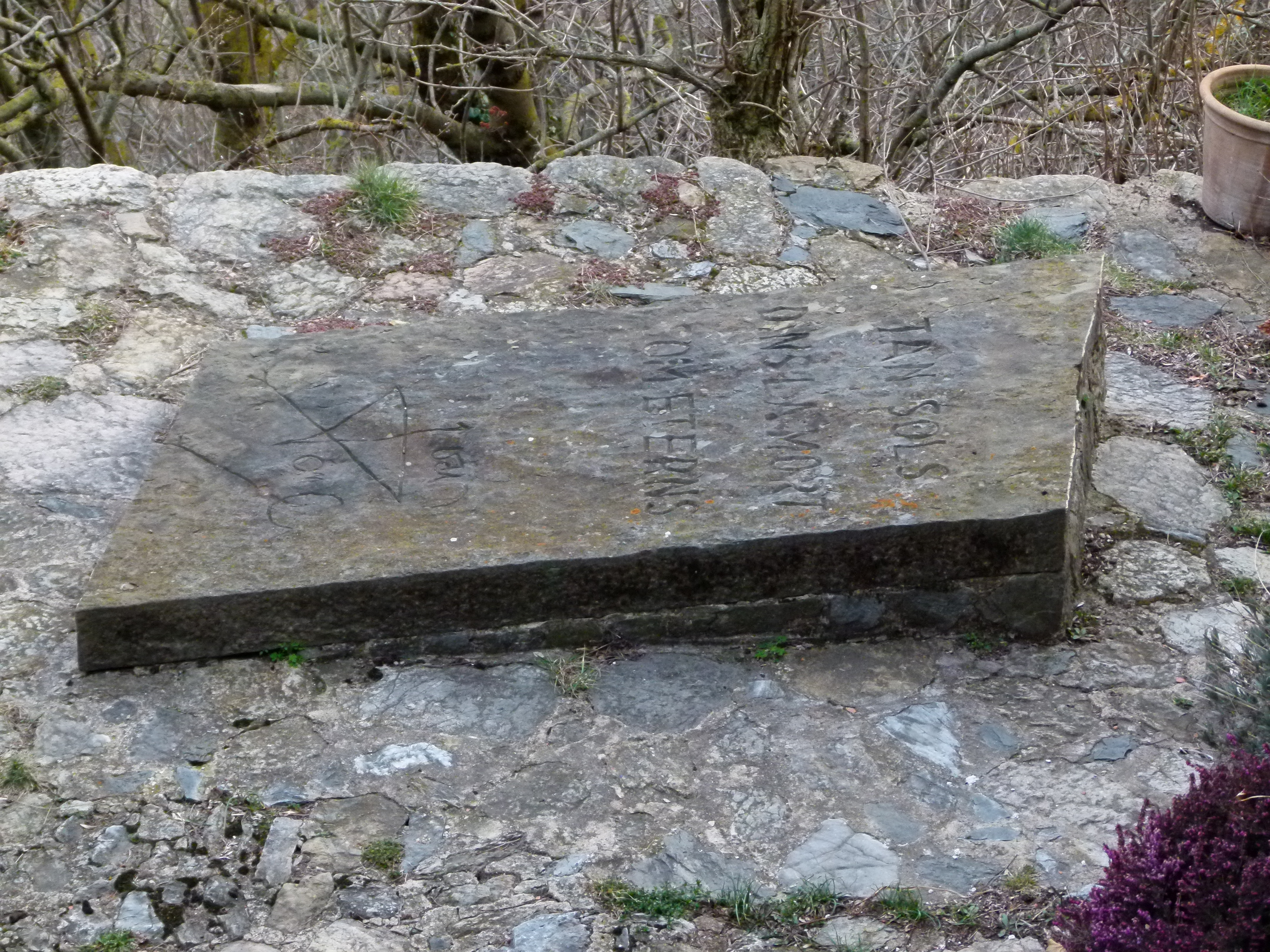
- Resting place of Tomba Joan Ponç i Bonet
- Born: November 28, 1927; Sarrià, Barcelona, Spain
- Died: April 4, 1984 (aged 56); Saint-Paul-de-Vence, France
- Occupation: Artist
- Known for: Dau al set

Joan Ponç (November 28, 1927 – April 4, 1984) was a Catalan artist and member of the avant-garde group Dau al Set.

== Life and work ==
Joan Ponç was born in the Sarrià neighborhood of Barcelona, Spain to Gumersindo Pons and Dolors Bonet. He attended the Colegio Salesiano San Antonio de Padua de Mataró boarding school from 1940-1942, during which time he decided to pursue an interest in painting.

In 1946, Ponç presented his first solo art exhibition at the Sala Arte de Bilbao, and met fellow Dau al Set contributors Joan Brossa, J.V. Foix, and Arnau Puig. Over the next couple of years, Ponç actively interacted and collaborated with forerunners of the Catalan avant-garde, such as Modest Cuixart and Joan Miró. Though the Dau al Set group ultimately disbanded in 1954, Ponç continued presenting his own artwork until 1980.

On April 4, 1984, Ponç died of a heart attack while at his home in Saint-Paul-de-Vence, France. Four days later, he was returned to his residence and workshop in La Roca del Vallès, near Barcelona, for burial.
