= Joan Castejón =

Spanish painter

- Born: Joan Ramón García Castejón; December 17, 1945; Elche (Alicante), Spain
- Education: Real Academia de Bellas Artes de San Carlos, Valencia, Spain
- Known for: Painting, Drawing, Sculpture, Engraving
- Movement: Social realism, Expressionism, Surrealism
- Spouse: Paca Galván

Joan Ramón García Castejón, Elche, (December 17, 1945), known as Joan Castejón (Valencian pronunciation: [dʒuˈaŋ kasteˈjon]) is a Spanish draftsman, painter and sculptor, considered one of the leading representatives of social realism in the Spanish postwar plastic renewal. Member of the Grup d'Elx.

His work has been exhibited in some of the most important museums in Spain, among others, the Institut Valencià d'Art Modern (IVAM), the Museum of the University of Alicante, Guerricabeitia Martinez Collection at the University of Valencia, Miguel Hernández University of Elche, the Bancaja Foundation Center, Centre of the Carmen Valencia, and the Museum of Contemporary Art of Elche.

== Biography ==
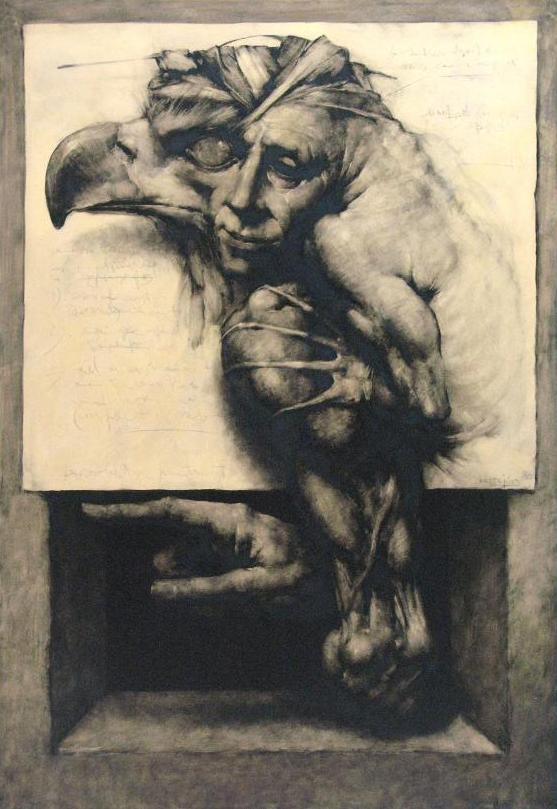
'Mutant eagle', wax on paper, by Joan Castejón.

=== Early life ===
At sixteen he moved to Valencia, where he received training in fine arts at the Academy of San Carlos. His first solo exhibition took place in the Valencian art gallery Mateu in 1966. This first moment of his career (1964-1967) can be described as neofigurative. The human figure (sometimes grouped) appears in the middle of undefined spaces. Works from this stage, including anthropomorphic themed drawings, announce the peculiar features that characterize his later works: a tense correctness of line which develops vigorous anatomic effects.

=== Court-martial ===
That momentum of his career was cut abruptly, however, by the participation in demonstrations of May 1967 in Valencia against Francoist regimen. After standing up for a friend who was being brutally beat, a plainclothes agent arrested Castejón. He received several beatings that night and short after that he was sentenced by the Francoist court-martial to six years in prison.

=== Political imprisonment ===
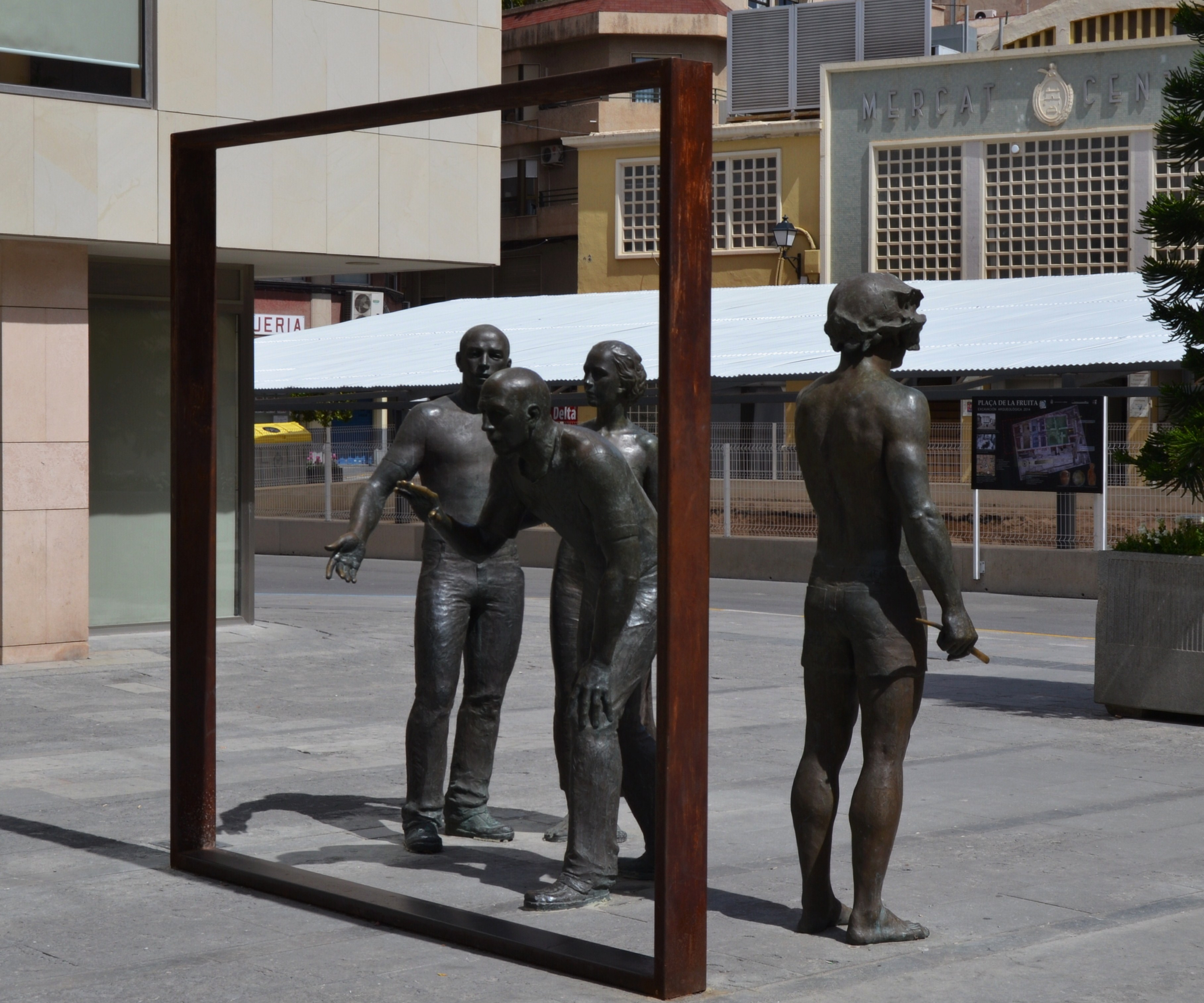
Sculptures by Joan Castejón in Elche, his birthplace.

Until mid 1969 he remains in prisons of Valencia and Teruel. That year became part of the Grup d'Elx in its second stage, participating regularly in all the exhibitions of the group until 1971. As a consequence of these doings he was taken back to a prison in the Canary Islands for another seven months in 1971. He does not leave the creative work in prison, where he draws two thousand drawings with wax or pencil at this time, defining another stage of production inevitably influenced by these circumstances.

=== Dénia ===
Castejón married Paca Galván in 1973 and returned to Valencia where he briefly rejoined the local art scene, but a year later he settled permanently in Dénia, a small city on the coast. Taking up painting, he opted for a more explicit and shocking expressionism during the end of the 70s. Later in the 80s, he explored a brighter abstraction inspired by the landscape, while an increasingly theatrical virtuoso drawing dominated the 90s. The human being became the central reference of his work. Mankind is always addressed as tragic matter, as a heroic thing that has been beaten, subjected after a struggle with destiny and with an adverse world.

In 1999 he was honored as Adopted Son by the city Dénia, where he has lived since 1974.

== Works ==
'El Salt', wax on paper, 2002, by Joan Castejón.

If there is one aspect that stands out in the work of Joan Castejón is his drawing skill, also in his painting. José Manuel Caballero Bonald wrote regarding this: "the artist draws a classic and meditate as a prophet". The author and official historian of Alicante Enrique Cerdan Tato wrote in El País on Castejón's works: " ... he wanted to express a human universe revealed by violence: the helpless crowd was resolved in a powerful blast of fragments, lines, volumes, bestiaries and masks".

On leaving prison he painted a series of one hundred works inspired by the Gabriel García Márquez novel One Hundred Years of Solitude, which was exhibited in Valencia and Barcelona. Mario Vargas Llosa wrote on this occasion about Castejón's art: "One of the most interesting aspects of this collection of paintings by Castejón is showing us that even today the art of painting can, without giving anything for their own purposes or abandon modernity, have the literature as a starting point. Like a woman, a dream, or a crime, a novel can be for an artist a creative ferment... "

Martí Dominguez published in the pages of El País about the drawing skills in the art of Castejón: "Any exaggeration is objectionable, and to say that Joan Castejón is possibly the Spanish artist who at this moment dominates human anatomy at its best may seem a excess, but it is not."

According to the art critic Román de la Calle, "his existential drama reflects a strong moral commitment that transcends any cynical or political pamphlet temptation. Castejón evokes a reality with surreal symbolic ingredients and allegorical translations from his personal experience. Virtuosity in the expressionist treatment of the human body is patent."

His exhibition "Per a Paca" crossed the province of Alicante between 2009 and 2010 as a tribute to his wife. According to the newspaper La Verdad is "a retrospective of historical memories of the couple. This is an abstract exhibition with over 50 works, scenes of pain and surprise with a retrospective review that allows access to various historical moments."

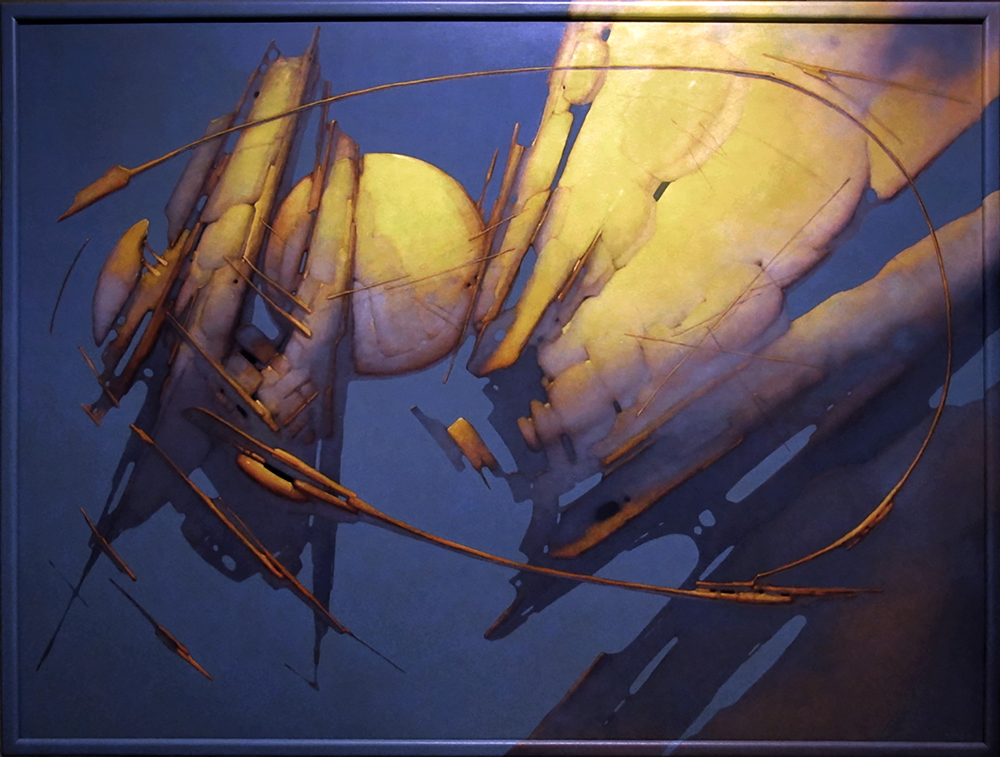
'Golden landscape', oil on canvas, 1993, by Joan Castejón.

== List of selected works ==
- Maternidad gris (1969)
- The’y were more than three thousand (1973)
- Characters reduced by their own deeds (1974)
- La digestió (1978)
- Mutant d'águila irreal (1980)
- The day (1984)
- A Salvador Espriu (1989)
- Paisatge daurat 1993 (1993)
- El Salt (2002)
- Cavall nocturn (2004)
- The War (2009)

== Museology ==
The largest public collection of works by Castejón is gathered at the Museum of Contemporary Art in his hometown Elche. The largest private collection was the collection Lecasse Foundation in Alcoy, containing about two hundred works acquired by businessman Lionel Grau Mullor during the eighties and nineties. Currently this collection was divided among his heirs. The collection of drawings dedicated to Don Quixote belong to the IVAM. Another good part of Parts is in the collection of Foundation Bancaja, Valencia.

== List of awards ==
- Total Art Work Award, given by the Wagner Society of Alicante, 2014
- Premio Ocell, by the Mancomunitat de la Marina Alta. 2005.
- Honour member of the Institut d'Estudis Comarcals del Baix Vinalopó. 2001.
- Honour member of the Institut d'Estudis Comarcals de la Marina Alta. 1999.
- Adoptive Son of the city of Dénia. Ajuntament de Dénia. 1999.
- Premi la Tardor, by the Universitat Politècnica de València. 1994.
- Homage to Joan Castejón. Key of the City of Mont De Marsan. France. 1993.

== See also ==
- Social realism
- Grup d'Elx

== Bibliography ==
- DE LA CALLE, Román. Castejón: La realidad de lo imaginario, València: CIMAL, 1981–82, p. 16
- SEBASTIÁ, Jordi. La meua vocació de pintar es absoluta, entrevista an El Temps 899, 4-10 Septembre, 2001, pp. 35–37.
