= Josep Vicenç Foix =

Catalan writer and poet (1893–1987)

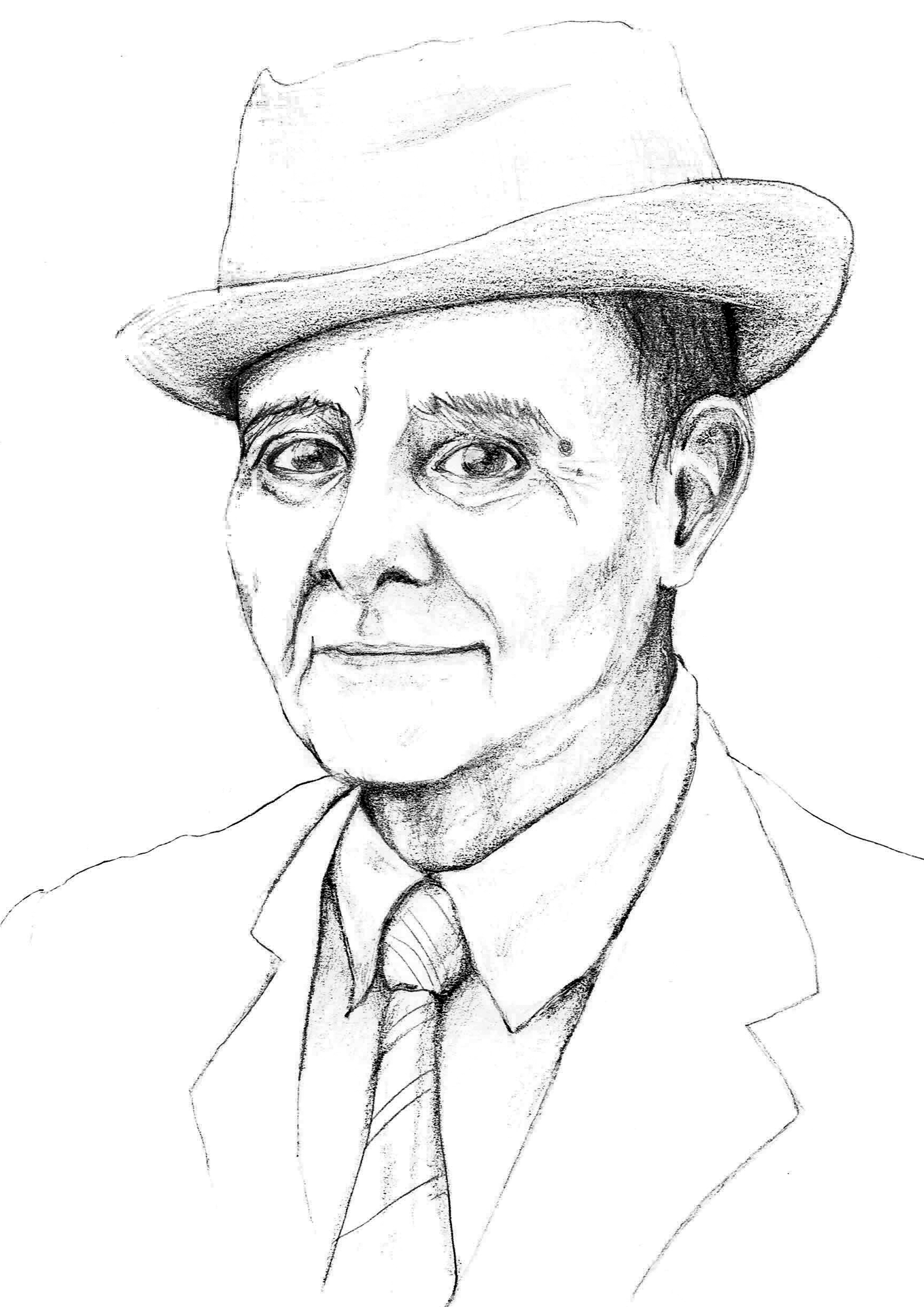
Josep Vicenç Foix i Mas

Josep Vicenç Foix i Mas (Catalan pronunciation: [ʒuˈzɛb biˈsɛns ˈfoʃ]; 28 January 1893 in Barcelona – 29 January 1987) was a Catalan poet, writer, and essayist. He usually signed his work by using the abbreviation J.V. Foix.

== Biography ==
Born in Sarrià, Barcelona, Foix was the son of a baker. He started a university degree in law, but gave it up after the second year. Later, he worked in the family business as well as reading classic masterpieces of literature by authors such as Lord Byron, Dante Alighieri and Charles Baudelaire. Foix remained rooted to the place where he was born, even after the conclusion of the Spanish Civil War. Foix's work had a consistent liberal tone; he was also involved in introducing avant-garde ideas to Catalonia.

In 1916, Foix began to collaborate with La Revista and started to become interested in avant-garde art. He found work among publications such as Trossos, La Cònsola (1919–1920) or La Publicitat (1923–1936), where he worked as an art director.

At the end of the Spanish Civil War, Foix returned to the family business, and his artistic presence receded for some time. During this time he compiled his entire poetic opus, and he also acted as a mentor for young artists close to the avant-garde scene, such as Joan Brossa.

On 25 May 1962, he became a member of the Institut d'Estudis Catalans. His popularity continued to grow, thanks to Joan Manuel Serrat and his song És quan dormo que hi veig clar, which was adapted from one of Foix's poems.

He received many different awards during his life, among them are the Gold Medal of the Generalitat of Catalonia (Medalla d'Or de la Generalitat de Catalunya, 1981) and the Catalan Literary Lifetime Achievement Award (Premi d'Honor de les Lletres catalanes, 1984). In 1984, the Parliament of Catalonia proposed that he should be considered for the Nobel Prize in Literature.

J. V. Foix helped in 1985 to reestablish the students' association Federació Nacional d'Estudiants de Catalunya (FNEC). He was named its Honorary President.

He died in 1987 and was buried in Sarrià. His personal library is located at the Biblioteca de Catalunya.

== Bibliography ==
- J.V. Foix 2002, Jaume Vallcorba, Ediciones Omega ISBN 978-84-282-1250-2
