= Modest Cuixart =

Spanish painter

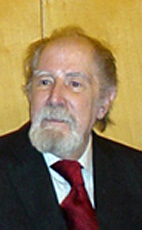
Modest Cuixart (2012)

Modest Cuixart i Tàpies (born 2 November 1925 in Barcelona – died 31 October 2007 in Palamós) was a Catalan painter. He is, along with poet Joan Brossa and painters Joan Ponç, his cousin Antoni Tàpies and Joan-Josep Tharrats, the founder of surrealist et dada review Dau al Set in 1948.
