= Joan Brossa =

Catalan poet

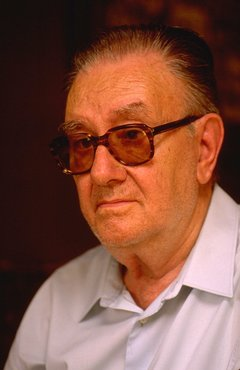
- Brossa on 10 September 1998
- Born: Joan Brossa i Cuervo; 19 January 1919; Barcelona, Catalonia, Spain
- Died: 30 December 1998 (aged 79); Barcelona, Catalonia
- Known for: Poetry, Theatre, Sculpture, Plastic Arts, Graphic Design
- Movement: surrealism, dada, Dau al Set,

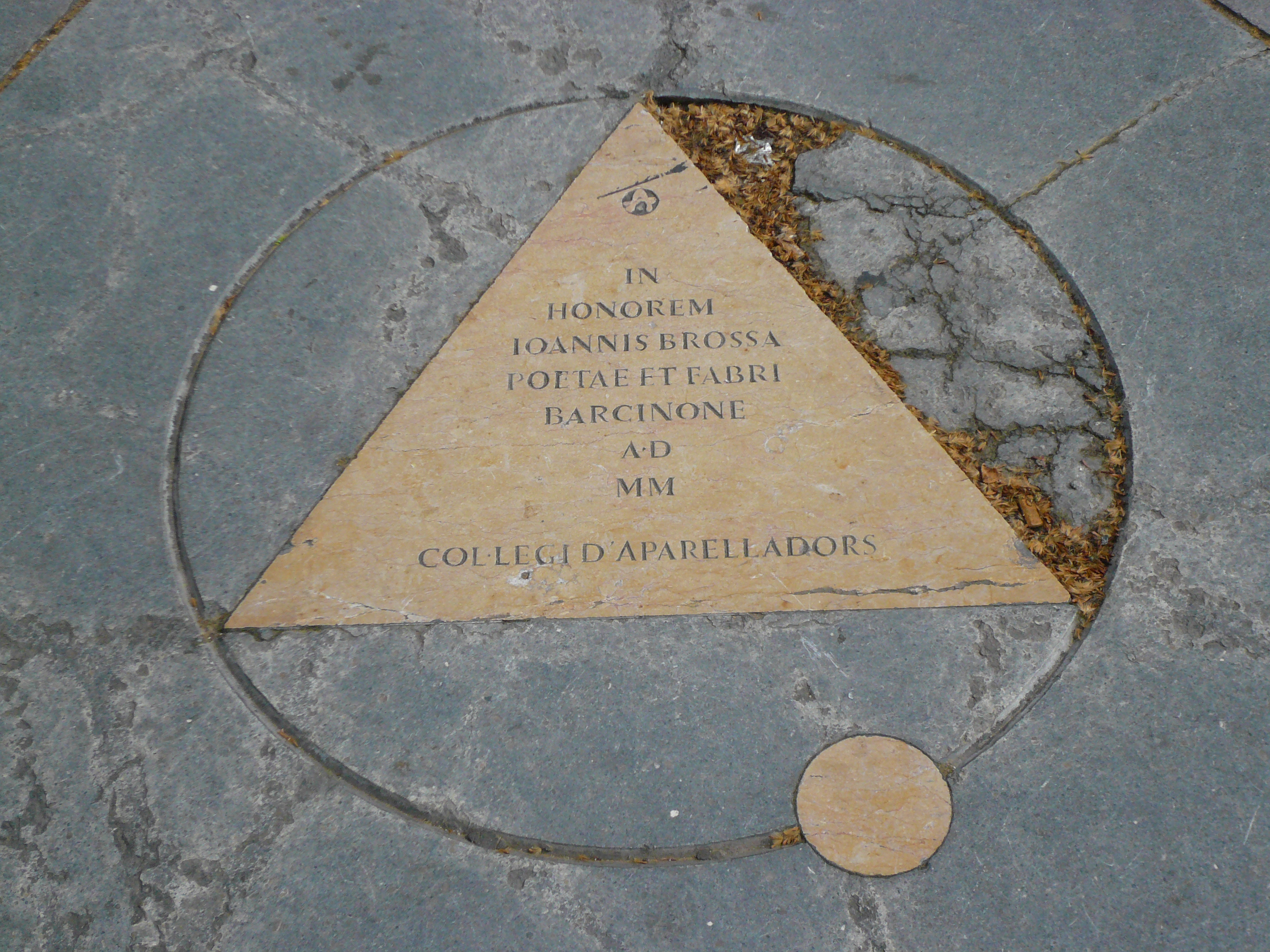
"Homenatge a Joan Brossa" in Barcelona

Joan Brossa (Catalan pronunciation: [ʒuˈam ˈbɾɔsə]; 19 January 1919 – 30 December 1998) was a Catalan poet, playwright, graphic designer and visual artist. He wrote only in the Catalan language.

He was one of the founders of both the group and the publication known as Dau-al-Set (1948) and one of the leading early proponents of visual poetry in Catalan literature. Although he was in the vanguard of the post-war poets, he also wrote hundreds of formally perfect sonnets, sapphic odes, and sestinas as well as thousands of free and direct poems. His creative work embraced every aspect of the arts: cinema, theatre (more than 360 pieces), music, cabaret, the para-theatrical arts, magic, and the circus.

== Life and work ==
For him, expression had priority over content, and he managed to give his poetry the appearance of plays on words. His lyrical work is connected with the theatre while the totality of his literature (more of 80 books, all written in the Catalan language) is impregnated with the theatrical dimension as he always employed a broad and interdisciplinary vision of culture, the arts in general and the performance arts in particular. This vision was expressed in his literary and visual works which often appeared as satirical, cutting, ironic and critical or, on other occasions, irreverent yet playful. In the latter years of his creative life, he received a number of awards such as the National Prize for the Visual Arts (1992), the National Theatre Prize (1998) and the UNESCO Picasso Medal. He has been posthumously awarded doctorate honoris causa from the Universitat Autònoma de Barcelona (1999). He was a member and then Honorary Member of the Associació d'Escriptors en Llengua Catalana (Association of Catalan Language Writers). His visual poetry (poesia plàstica), obviously placed beyond all linguistic borders, is recognized as a reference the world over.

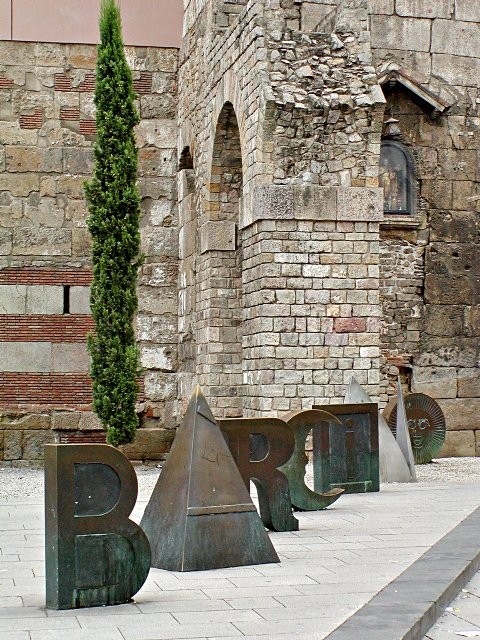
"Joan Brossa: Barcino" (the ancient Roman name for Barcelona), by the wall ruins near the Cathedral of Barcelona

He collaborated in the foundation of the Espai Escenic Joan Brossa (The Joan Brossa Theatrical Space) in the Born district of Barcelona, this being the initiative of the theatre director and actor Hermann Bonnín and the magician Hausson, who continued along the theatrical lines espoused by Brossa.

== Personal Archive ==
Throughout his life, Joan Brossa gathered a huge and varied amount of materials. The photos of his first studio in Balmes Street are famous, showing the pile of papers he stored on the floor of all the rooms. It was this accumulation that prompted him to rent, in 1987, a second study in which he continued to preserve diverse documentation until his death.

To safeguard this documentary legacy, after a year of the poet's death, the Fundació Joan Brossa was established, which took over the custody and cataloguing of all this material. It is estimated that Brossa's personal archive consists of approximately 52,000 documents. It is an archive of a wide and complex variety of materials, including manuscripts of his artistic and literary work (final drafts and versions), documents produced during the preparation of editions (lists, summaries, texts, proofs of printing, galerades, etc.), facsimiles, translation of literary works, correspondence, a collection of brochures, associations, posters, etc. The archive also includes administrative documentation (invoices, receipts and accounts).

The personal library of Joan Brossa, on the other hand, is made up of about six thousand books and many other issues of magazines that make up a collection rich in literary works, exhibition catalogues and essays on theatre, magic, cinema and other artistic expressions that interested him. It also includes the publications of texts by Brossa himself, as well as the studies of other authors on his work. The library was catalogued by the University of Barcelona thanks to the support of the Vila Casas Foundation, in the Espai Volart, where the materials could be consulted before they were transferred to MACBA.

In January 2012, Joan Brossa's library, personal archive, and art collection (including both his own artwork and works by artists such as Joan Miró and Antoni Tàpies) was transferred to the Centre d'Estudis i Documentació MACBA, under a 25-year agreement between the Fundació Brossa, the City of Barcelona (which had inherited the contents of one of his studies) and the MACBA.

== Dau al Set ==
Members of Dau-al-Set included:

- Joan Brossa
- Antoni Tàpies
- Joan Ponç
- Arnau Puig
- Modest Cuixart
- Joan-Josep Tharrats
- Juan-Eduardo Cirlot

Brossa's sculptural typography in Barcelona is featured in Eye magazine (No. 37, Vol. 10, Autumn 2000) along with the work of Josep Maria Subirachs.

== Gallery ==
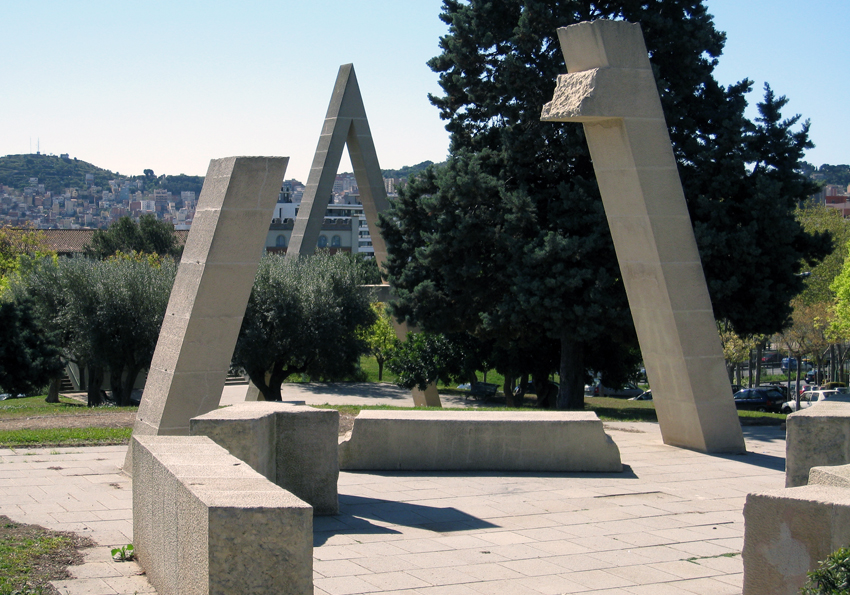
"Joan Brossa: Transitable visual poem in three times", in Velodrome's Park, Barcelona

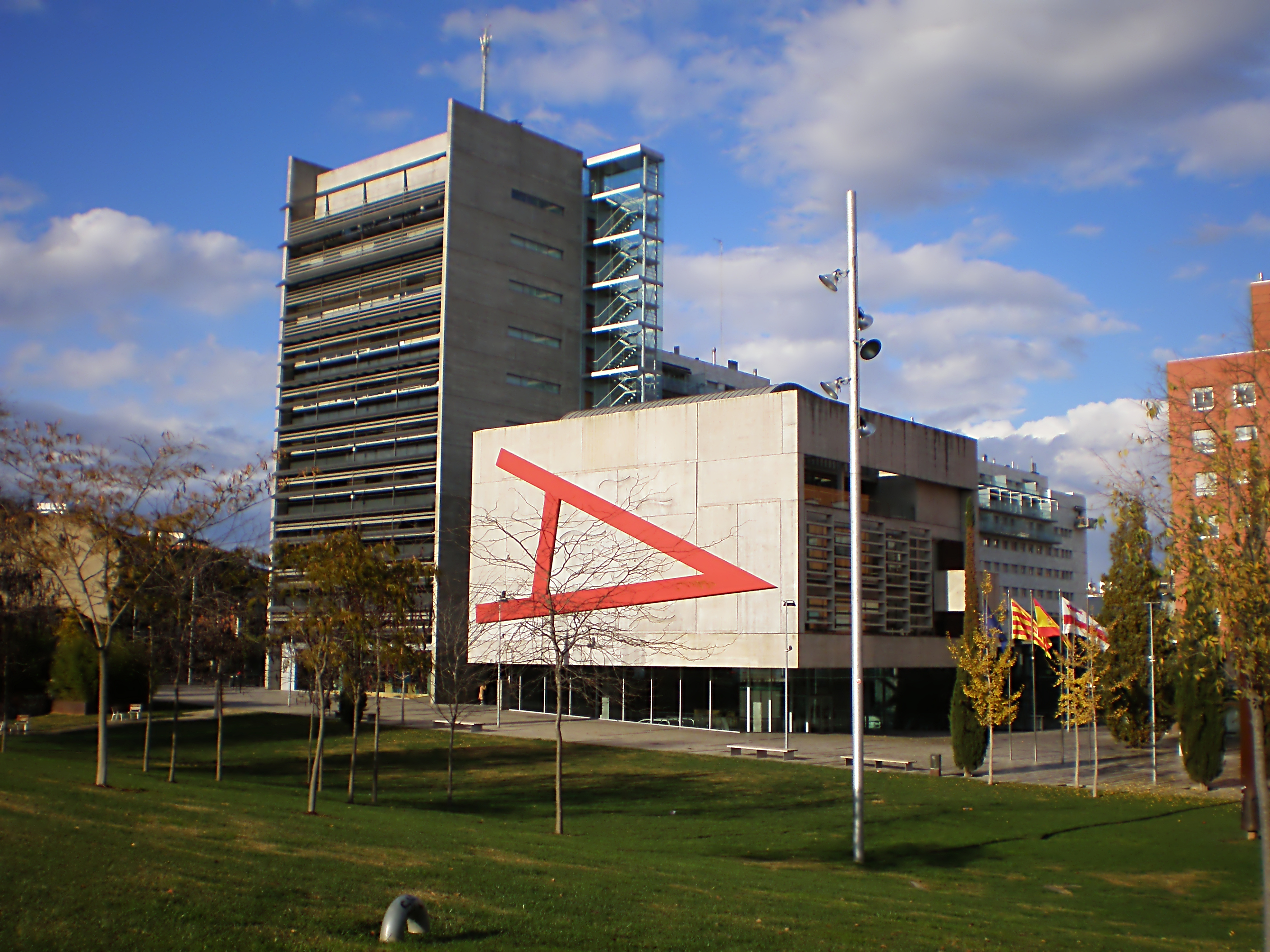
"Joan Brossa: Lying A with a fish", the City Hall of Mollet del Vallès

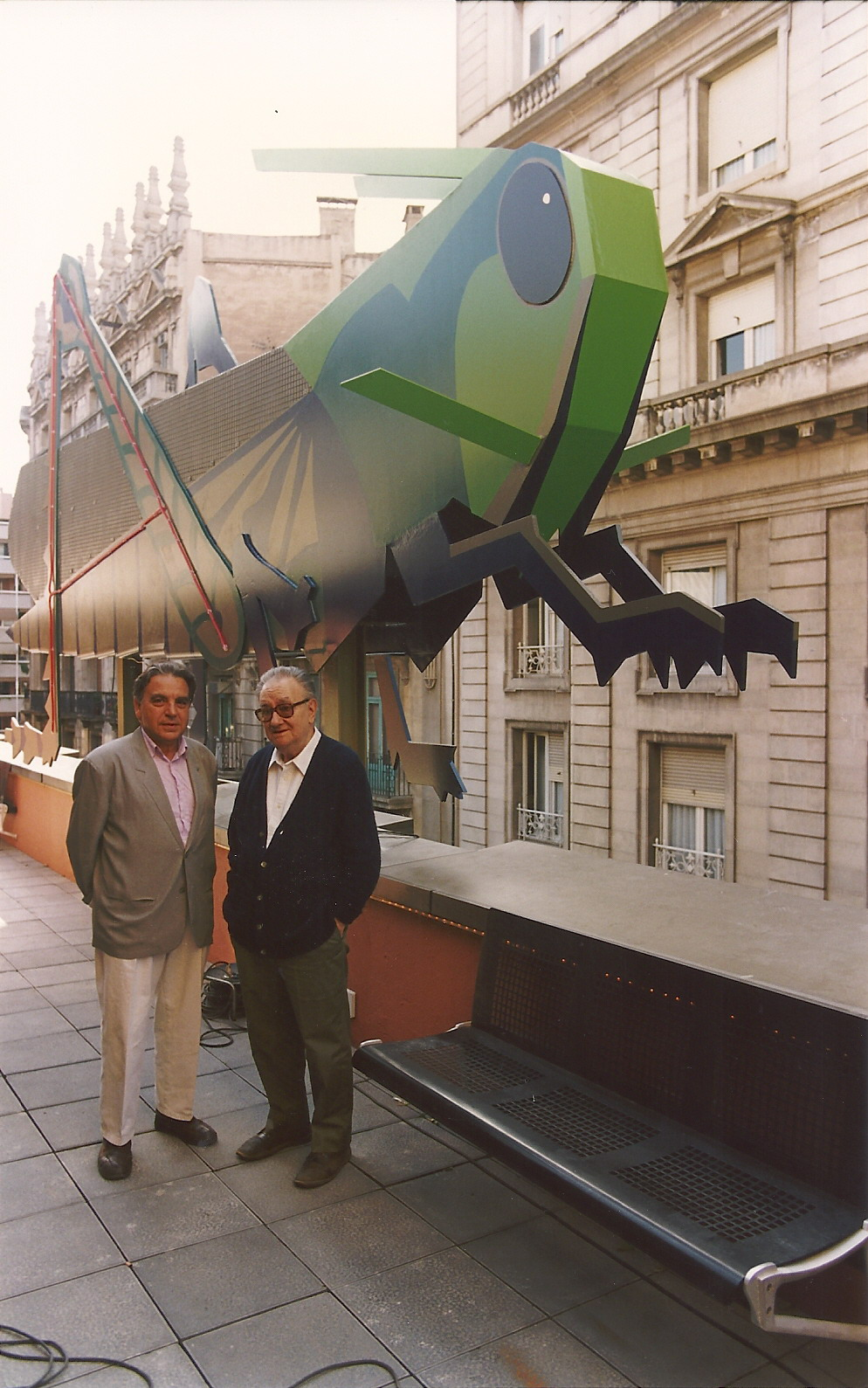
“The grasshopper, Headquarters of the Association of Technical Architects of Barcelona (1993). Designed by the artist and designer Josep Pla-Narbona from Joan Brossa's idea of the whole facade

== See also ==
- Espai Escènic Joan Brossa
