= Antoni Pitxot =

Spanish Catalan painter (1934–2015)

- Born: Antoni Pitxot i Soler; 5 January 1934; Figueres, Spain
- Died: 12 June 2015 (aged 81); Cadaqués, Spain
- Known for: Painting
- Movement: Surrealism

Antoni Pitxot i Soler (Catalan pronunciation: [ənˈtɔni piˈtʃɔt]; Figueres, Girona, January 5, 1934 – June 12, 2015) was a Spanish Catalan painter and a longtime friend and collaborator of Salvador Dalí.

== Life and work ==
Pitxot was born into a family with many artists in its ranks, among them, his uncle Ramon Pichot. (Note: It is quite common to find, in many Catalan families, relatives using either the "old" Spanish spelling of the family name -Pichot- or the Catalan spelling, "corrected" after Franco's death -Pitxot-.) He began studying drawing at the age of thirteen, and he exhibited regularly in Lisbon, Bilbao, Barcelona, and Madrid in his twenties and thirties, winning many prizes, including the Gold Medal painting prize in Barcelona's La Punyalada competition in 1965.

At the beginning of the 1960s, he was a close friend of the French painter Maurice Boitel, who painted many pictures on the Pitxot family's property in Cadaqués, a small port town on the Mediterranean Sea near the French border, that was also painted by Pablo Picasso and André Derain.

In 1966, Pitxot took up permanent residence in Cadaqués, where his family had owned a summer house since the end of the 19th century. He began to experiment with surrealism: in particular, he became focused on anthropomorphic figures composed of the stones that lined the seashores near his home. Pitxot worked in a unique way: he would build sculptures from stones, and then paint those sculptures in oil.

Much of Pixtot's work is concerned with allegory and myth, including the figure of Mnemosyne, the mother of the nine muses who personified memory, and a series of works about The Tempest.

Pitxot's association with Salvador Dalí began before his birth, because their families were acquainted. But Dalí became an early supporter of Antonio Pitxot's work, and eventually asked him to co-design the Dalí Theatre and Museum (Teatre-Museu Dalí) in Figueres, Spain. There is also a permanent exhibition of Pitxot's work on one floor of that museum.

Pitxot and Dalí were nearly inseparable in the last years of Dalí's life: designing Dalí's museum, teaching art and exchanging ideas about their work. Pitxot was a protector of Dalí's legacy after his death: He was a member of the board of the Gala Salvador Dalí Foundation, and he has led, and sat on the board, of several other Dalí foundations.

He became the museum's director after Dalí's death.

Pitxot was a respected international Catalan artist in his own right. In the year 2000, he was appointed corresponding academician for Cadaqués of the Royal Academy of Fine Arts of Saint George. In the 2004, he received the Gold Medal of Merit in Fine Arts from the King of Spain as a recognition for his work. In 2014 the City hall of Figueres (Girona) grants him the "Fulla de Figuera de Plata" and in 2015 was nominated "The Favorite Son of the Cadaqués city" (Girona) . Works are held in private collections and in various museums.

His brothers grandson is the Spanish actor, singer and comedian Bruno Oro Pichot.

He died in Cadaqués, where he had his studio, on June 12, 2015, at the age of 81.
