= Joan Fuster Bonnin =

Spanish painter

- Born: 1870; Palma de Mallorca
- Died: 1943 (aged 72–73); Palma
- Movement: Impressionism

Signature
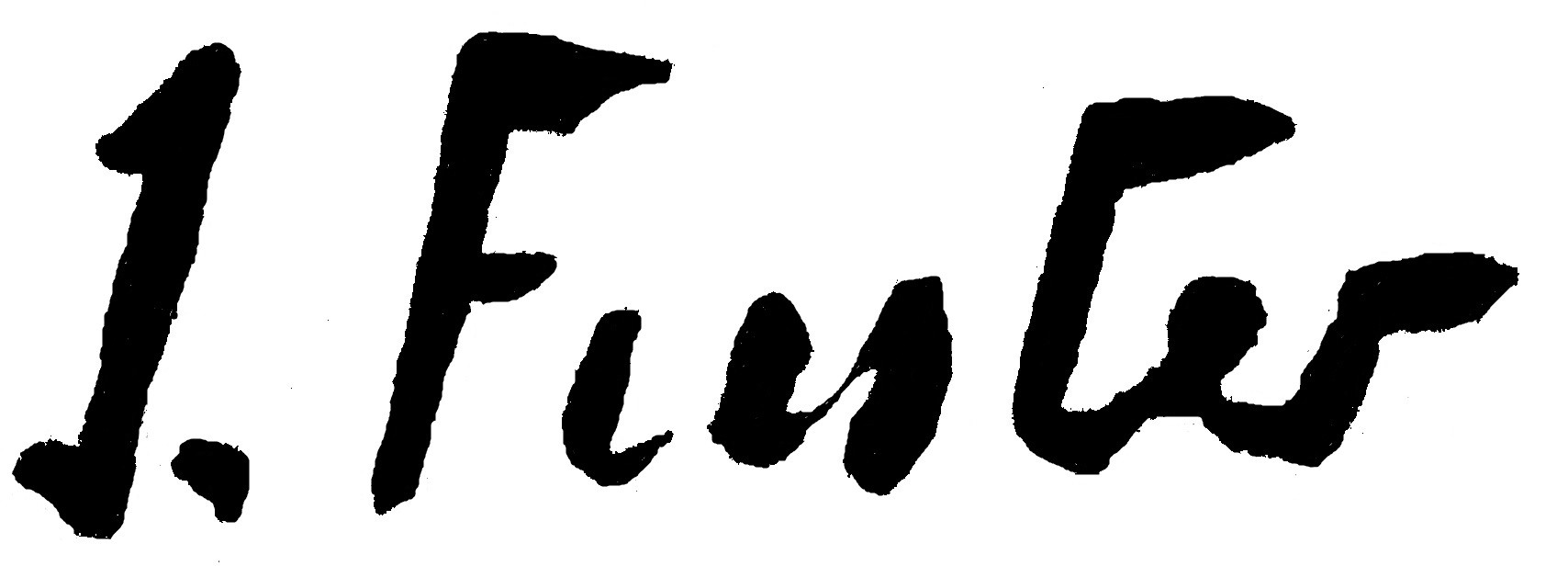

Joan Fuster Bonnin (1870-1943) was a Spanish painter.

== Biography ==
Joan Fuster Bonnin was born in Palma, Majorca in 1870. He trained at the School of Fine Arts and later at Ricardo Anckermann's studio-school. He was one of the most active, prolific, and prominent painters from the first half of the twentieth century. He had an ambition to evolve his style of painting and, although it was uncommon at the time, he was devoted exclusively to the craft of painting. He was influenced by the artistic renewal that unfolded on the island of Majorca and became interested in the innovative style of Antoni Gelabert Massot. In Bonnin's work the direct influence of the Anckermann School and of the artists Eliseu Meifrèn, Anglada Camarasa, William Degouve de Nuncques and Santiago Rusiñol can be seen. Bonnin developed his aesthetic in line with these influences, becoming a pioneer of the renewal of painting Majorcan style in the first third of the twentieth century.

Joan Fuster's work was mainly related to Rusiñol, Degouve and Juan Mir. Between 1908 and 1909, he befriended the French painter Henri Brugnot. He received money from Eliseu Meifrèn, which allowed him to stay in Majorca between 1907 and 1910. In 1914, he followed the work of Anglada Camarasa, and exchanged experiences in the 1930s with Guillem Bergnes.

He built a personal style which was chiefly concerned with open landscapes, space and light. He was passionate about nature and the light and colors of Majorca. Bonnin expressed his passion in an article in the August 15, 1928 issue of the newspaper El Día:

It is of interest to all Majorcan people, without distinction, to defend our landscape that is our essence. We can not miss any opportunity that presents itself to extol, affirm and proclaim it as much as possible. We have to take advantage of all the opportunities we encounter, precisely because of the fame of the Majorcan landscape, days of prosperity and welfare should emanate for all Majorcans.

His realistic impressionism style has similarities to another Majorcan painter, Miquel Forteza, which is especially apparent in the quality of his brushstrokes.

Bonnin actively exhibited his work in Spain, South America and throughout Europe. Thirty solo exhibitions have been documented. These took place in Palma, Mahon, Barcelona, Bilbao and Buenos Aires. His work also appeared in exhibitions in Madrid, Barcelona, London, Marseille and Munich.

== Major exhibitions ==
- National Exhibition of Fine Arts in Madrid (1899, 1901, 1904, 1906, 1908, 1926)
- Exposition d'Art in Barcelona (1898, 1907, 1921)
- National Exhibition of Painting, Sculpture and Architecture in Madrid (1910, 1912, 1917)
- Exhibition of Fine Arts in Marseille (1903)
- Munich International Exhibition (1913)
- Witcomb Exhibition of Buenos Aires (Argentina) (1929)

== Awards ==
- Silver Medal at the Exhibition Balear de Soller (1887)
- Gold Medal at the International Exhibition Marseille (1903)
- Honorable Mentions in the National Exhibition of Fine Arts in Madrid (1904 and 1906)

== Tributes ==
- Circulo Bellas Artes de Palma (1945)
- Quint Gallery (1947)
- Centennial Exhibition (1970)
- Chapter House in La Cartuja (1970)
- Sa Llonja (1995)

== Works ==
- "The Passeig del Born" - Oil on canvas (132 X 207)
- "Retrat de l'Wife" - Oil on canvas (67 X 54)
- "Vista de la Badia de Palma a la sortida des sol" - Oil on canvas (58 X 71)
- "Nocturn amb figures" - Oil on canvas (102 X 129)
- "L'amo Moragues Son" - Oil on canvas (136.5 x 75.5)
- "Son Tarongers Rock" - Oil on canvas (64 X 73.5)
- "Molinar Nocturn" - Oil on canvas (60 X 41.5)
- "Sa Foradada" - Oil on canvas (46 X 55)

== Bibliography ==
- Joan Fuster - Edicions Llonja (ISBN 84-86815-65-7)
- Dictionary "Rafols" - Fuster Bonnin, Joan (ISBN 84-398-2897-7)
- The contemporary painting in Mallorca Vol II - Joan Fuster (Editions Cort - Gaspar Sabater)
- Fruitful and persistent work of the painter Juan Fuster - Pere Ferrer Gibert (Article Journal "Balears" 04/11/1943)
- Pictures of Joan Fuster - Manuel Cirer Moragues (Journal Article "La Ultima Hora" 26/11/1903)
- The Joan Fuster exhibition - Ernest Dethorey (Journal Article "El Día" 11.14.1926)
- About the Mallorcan landscape - Joan Fuster (Journal Article "El Día" 15/08/1928
- Salvat Dictionary - Fuster Bonnin, Joan (Salvat Editores, p. 1568. Fourth Volume.)
- Thirty-five years of painting in Baleares - Joan Cabot Llompart (Article magazine "Artes Plásticas" number 39)
- Joan Fuster - Bru Morell (Article newspaper "El Día" 08.01.1994)
- Paisajistas Españoles del Siglo XIX (Spanish Landscape 19th century)
- Paraíso Balear (Balear Paradise)
