= Cadaqués =

- Municipality
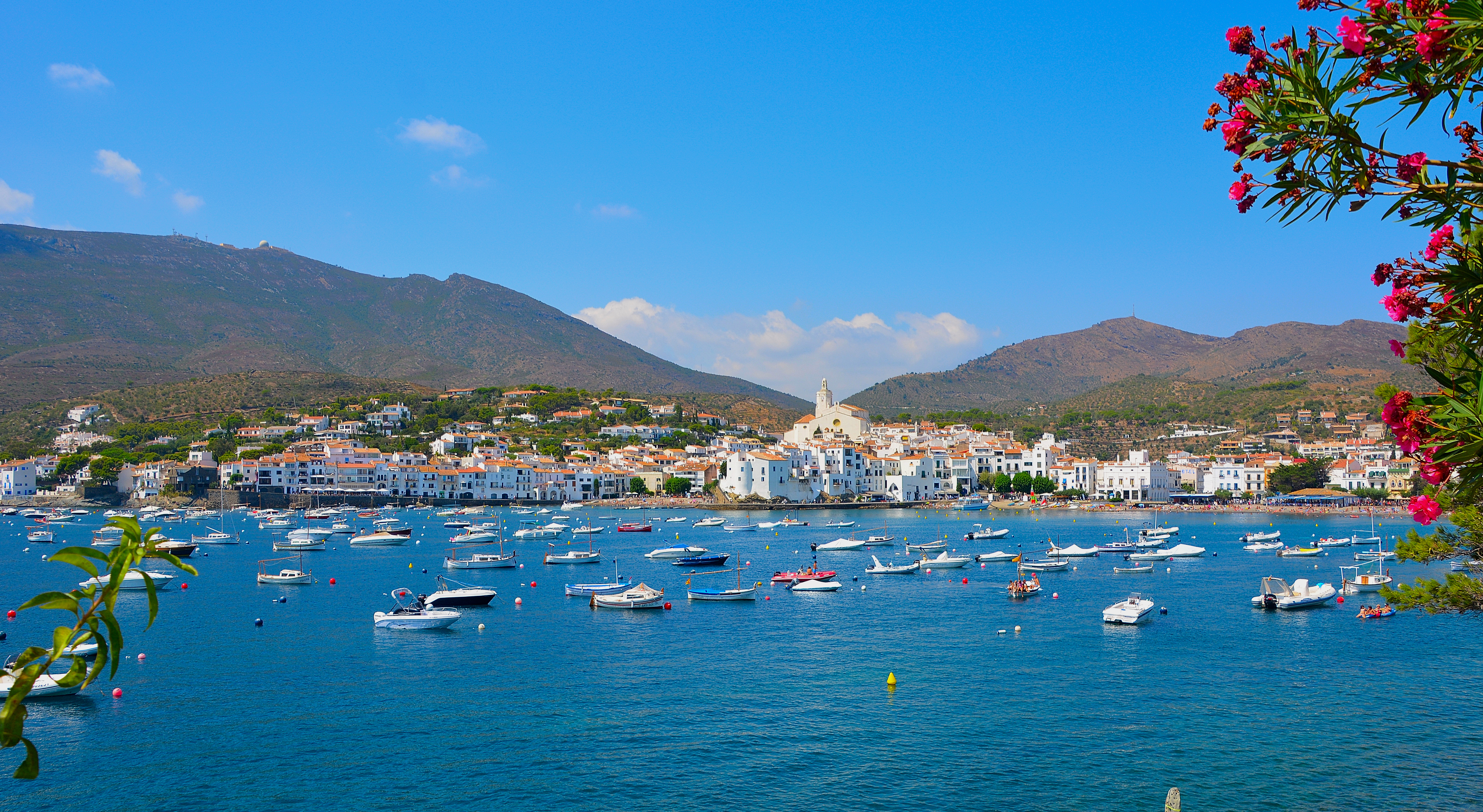

- Coat of arms

- Location in Catalonia Cadaqués (Spain)
- Coordinates: 42.289°N 3.275°E
- Country: Spain
- Autonomous community: Catalonia
- Province: Girona
- Comarca: Alt Empordà

Government
  - Mayor: Josep Lloret Parellada (2015) (ERC)

Area
  - Total: 26.4 km^{2} (10.2 sq mi)
- Elevation: 23 m (75 ft)

Population (2025-01-01)
  - Total: 2,918
  - Density: 111/km^{2} (286/sq mi)
- Demonym: Cadaquesenc
- Website: www.cadaques.cat

Cadaqués (Catalan: [kəðəˈkes]; Spanish: [kaðaˈkes]) is a town in the Alt Empordà comarca, in the province of Girona, Catalonia, Spain. It is on a bay in the middle of the Cap de Creus peninsula, near Cap de Creus cape, on the Costa Brava of the Mediterranean. It is a two-and-a-quarter-hour drive from Barcelona, and thus it is accessible not only to tourists but also to people who want a second home for weekends and summers. In 2018, Cadaqués had an official population of 2,752, but up to ten times as many people can live in the town during the peak of the summer tourism season.

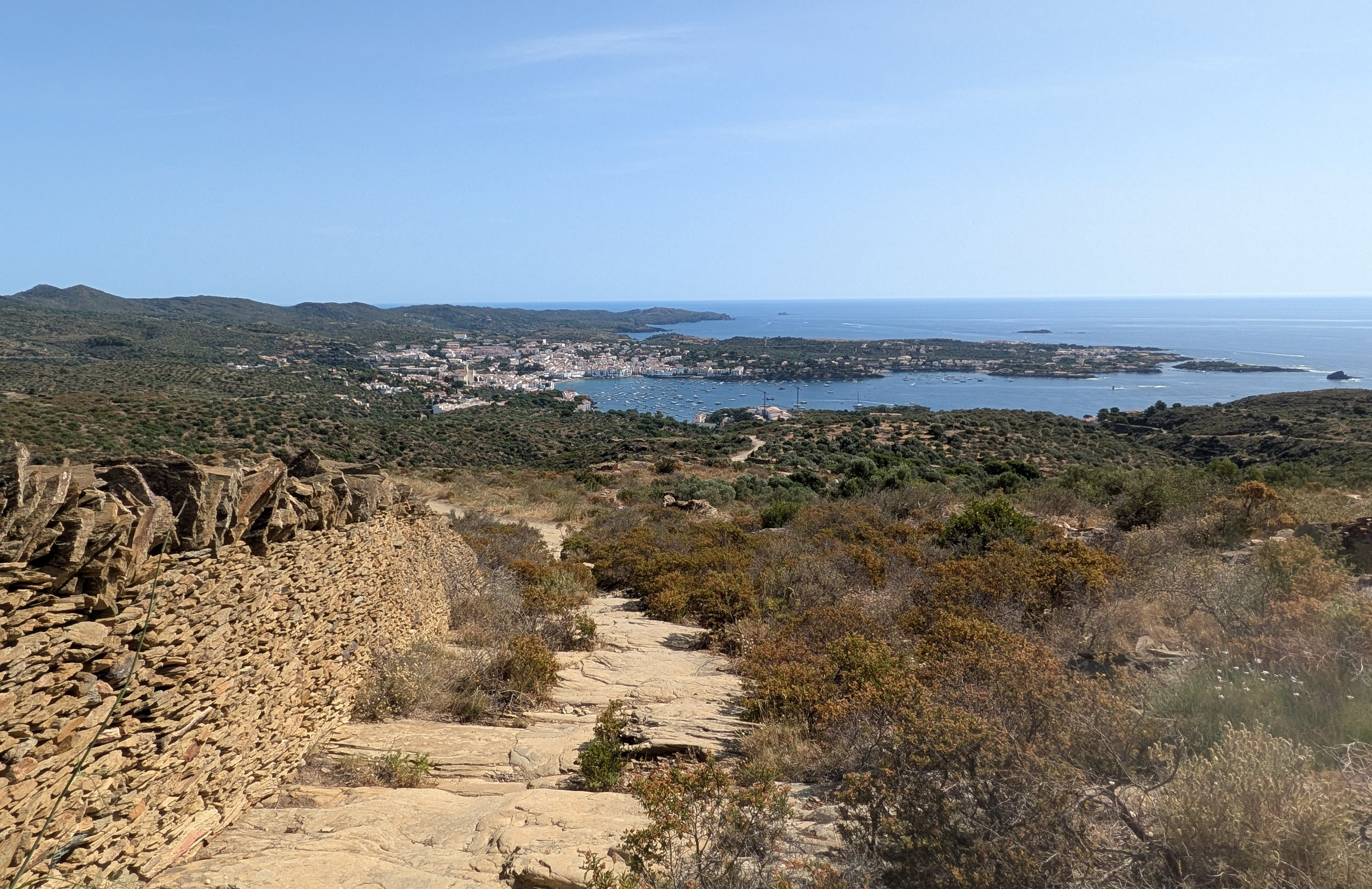
View from the south towards Cadaqués and its bay.

Cadaqués has a special place in art history. Commanding charcoals, by local artist Eliseu Meifrèn, of the 19th century Cadaqués beleaguered by a winter tramontane, can be seen at the Cadaqués museum. Fren was the first modern artist to live in Cadaqués and gave the town many of his works and a marble top table on which he sketched many of its turn-of-the-century fishermen.

Salvador Dalí often visited Cadaqués in his childhood, and later kept a home in Port Lligat, a small village on a bay next to the town. A summer holiday here in 1916, spent with the family of Ramon Pichot is seen as especially important to Dalí's artistic career. Other notable artists, including Pablo Picasso, Joan Miró, Marcel Duchamp, Richard Hamilton, Albert Ràfols-Casamada, Antoni Pitxot, Henri-François Rey, Melina Mercouri and Maurice Boitel also spent time here. Cadaqués is mentioned in the story "Tramontana" by Gabriel García Márquez.

The interesting submarine life of this sleepy fishing village was studied for several years by phycologist Françoise Ardré, long before Cadaqués was discovered and transformed into a tourism destination. On Mondays there is a travelling market in Cadaqués, located near the parking lot. This market has a wide variety of products.

A Jewish community once existed in the medieval period, and the old Jewish quarter in Cadaqués can still be visited today.

== Name ==
Cadaqués is a phonetic spelling of the contraction of Catalan Cap de quers (Cape of Rocks). In medieval documents, both Cadaqués and Cadaquers spellings coexisted together.

== History ==
=== Relationship with Cuba ===
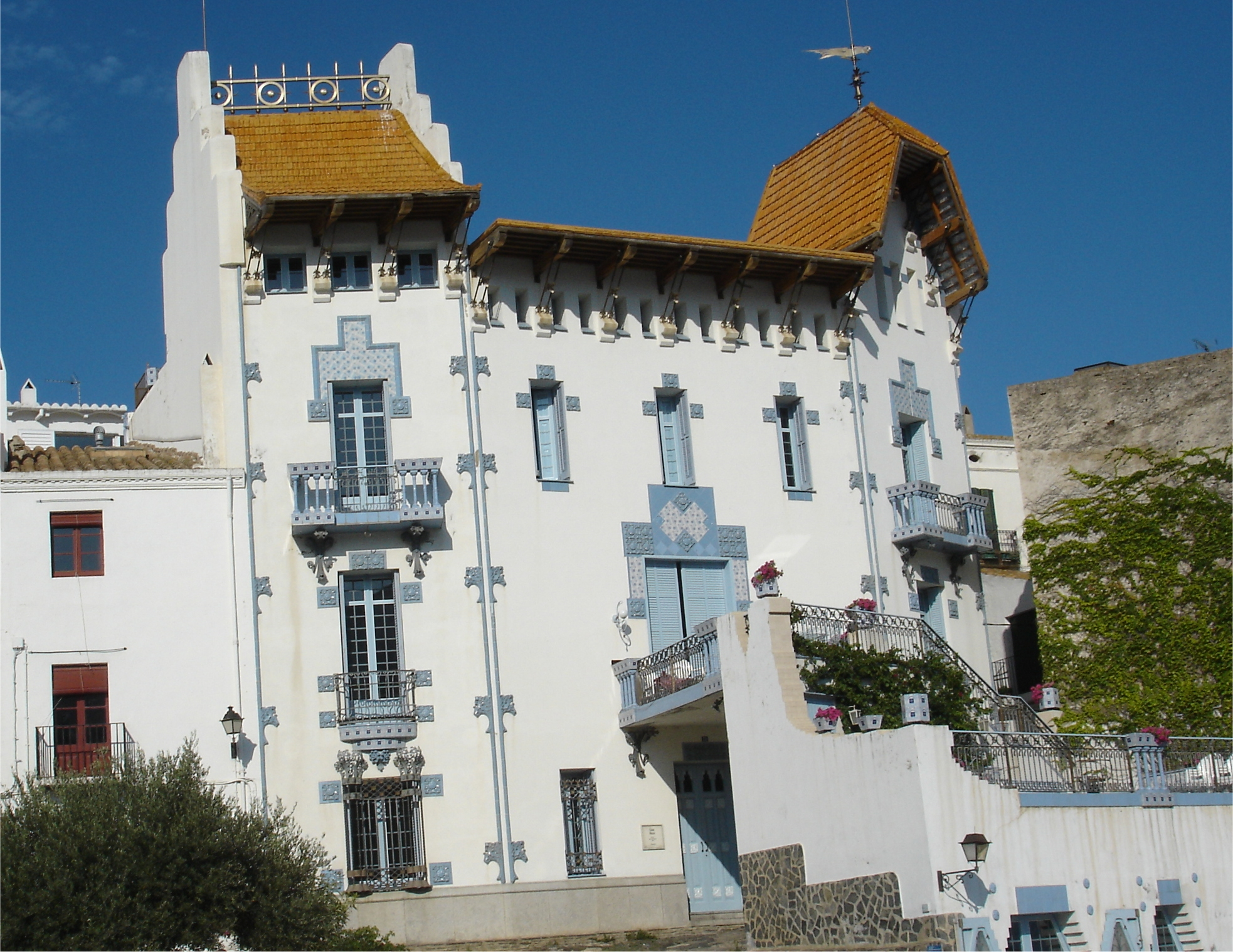
Cadaqués' Blue House (Casa Blava) built in 1915.

Cadaqués' Cafe de La Habana video

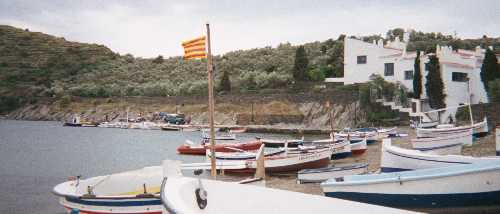
The adjacent village of Port Lligat, with Dalí's home at right

In the early 20th century a large number of inhabitants of Cadaqués travelled or emigrated to Cuba (the figure has been estimated as one third of a village of approximately 1200 people). Many of these immigrants were financially successful in Cuba and returned to Cadaqués where they constructed large and ornate houses. These houses can still be seen in the town (for example; the "Casa Blava", "Blue House" in English). A person returned from Cuba was referred to as an "Americano" among other names.

=== Traditions ===
Women of the village traditionally fetched water using a glazed earthenware jug called a "doll". The colour of the glazing was green. Similar earthenware can still be seen used as decorations. A number of photos exist showing women carrying these "dolls" on their heads (covered with a protective cloth).

Owing to Cadaqués's proximity to the French border and its isolation by land, the village had a tradition of running contraband. See the writings of Josep Pla.

=== People ===
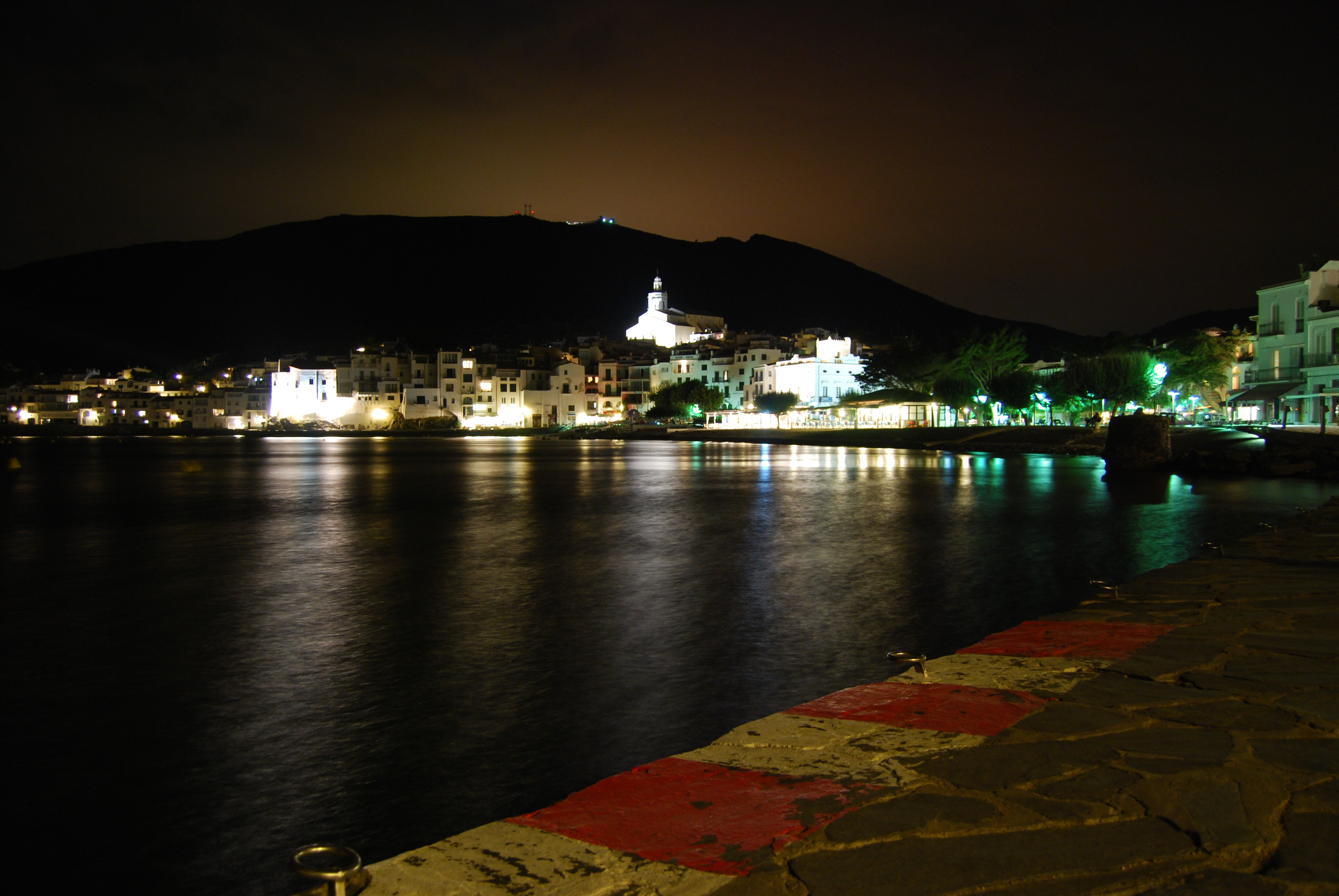
Shoreline of Cadaqués at night

- Pablo Picasso stayed during the summer of 1910, was also a guest of the family Pitxot
- Joan Miró
- José Antonio Coderch (1913–1984) prominent post-war Barcelona-born architect
- Marcel Duchamp played chess in the cafe "Meliton" with John Cage amongst others. According to Richard Hamilton, Duchamp regarded the local fishermen as strong chess players.
- Antoni Pitxot
- René Magritte
- Walt Disney
- Melina Mercouri
- Robert Venosa American visionary artist
- Maurice Boitel
- Eugenio d'Ors Catalan writer, wrote the "Ben Plantada" (the "Good Looking Girl")
- Josep Pla Catalan writer, wrote a number of books set in or about Cadaqués. see below
- Salvador Dalí built a house in Port lligat. Dalí's parents also had a house near the beach.
- Genia Chef Russian artist. His Madonna de la Esparanza hangs in the town's baroque Iglesia de Santa Maria
- Michael Lederer American author of the novel "Cadaqués"
- Federico García Lorca Spanish poet and dramatist
- André Breton French writer, poet, surrealist
- David Martí Catalan artist and writer
- Niki de Saint Phalle French artist, was invited or came to visit Marcel Duchamp
- Man Ray American artist, invited by Marcel Duchamp
- Mary Callery sculptor
- Dieter Roth artist
- Marcel Broodthaers
- Richard Hamilton (artist) English artist, invited by Marcel Duchamp
- John Cage composer, invited by Duchamp with whom he played chess
- Jean Tinguely collaborator with Niki de Saint-Phalle
- James Mason actor, filmed near Cadaqués
- Pablo Casals cellist, invited by the family Pitxot
- André Derain painter, invited by the family Pitxot; painted the village in 1910
- Raoul Pugno
- Jacint Morera Catalan painter
- Maria Martins Brazilian surrealist sculptrice
- Damien Rice
- Jordi Pagans i Monsalvatje Catalan painter
- Terence Weil cellist
- Luis Aznarez Musician
- Ignacio Iturria Uruguayan painter and founder of the Galeria Iturria

== Language ==
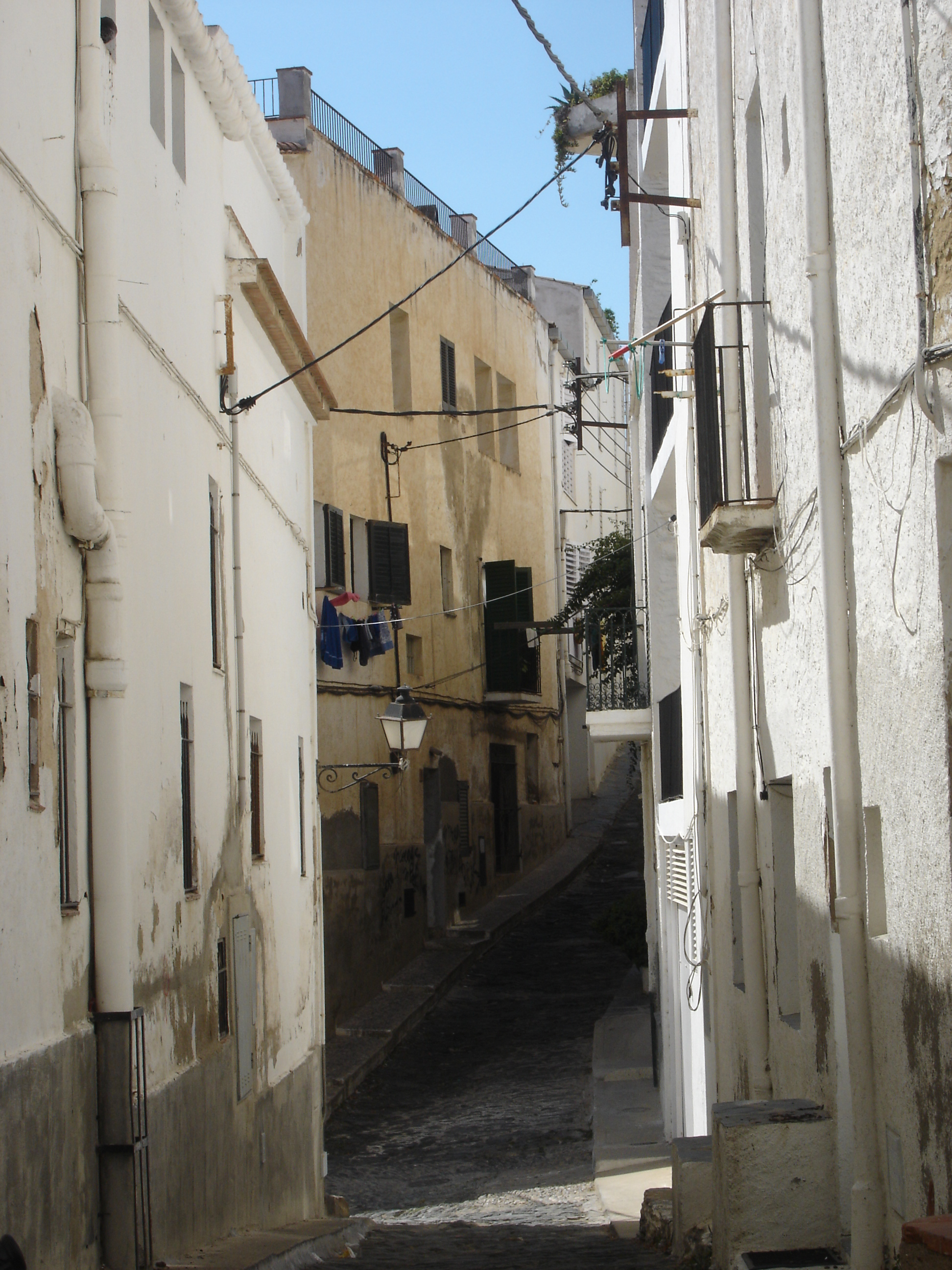
Cadaqués typical back street (rastell).

Even though people speak Spanish the village of Cadaqués has its own variant or dialect of the Catalan language. One of the most notable features is that the definite articles are different from standard Catalan, namely, they are "sa" (feminine) and "es" (masculine) instead of the normal Catalan definite articles "la" and "el". This feature is shared with the variant of Catalan spoken in the Balearic Islands. The explanation for this (see "El Vocabulari de Cadaqués", Ernesta Sala i Bruses) is that when the Catalan ruler Jaume I conquered the Balearic Islands in the Middle Ages he re-colonized the islands with people from the Empordà region of Catalonia. Because Cadaqués has remained relatively isolated from the surrounding region (owing to its geography), the mediaeval speech patterns have been preserved.

Another aspect of the speech variant of Cadaqués is the alteration of the first person singular of certain verbs: conjugations that normally end in "o" end in "i" in the Cadaqués variant. For example, "a vegades agafi molt per Cala Nans" (informant was an approximately 90-year-old fisherman). In standard Catalan this would be "a vegades agafo molt per Cala Nans" (meaning: sometimes I catch a lot at Cala Nans) The speech variant of Catalan has most similarities with the Catalan spoken in Ibiza (Balearic Islands).

The Catalan variant of Cadaqués is referred to as "cadaquesenc" by the local people and also has many lexical items. Examples include:

- rastell: a street (normally with a steep slope) which is formed with pieces of slate stone placed in a vertical position. These types of streets are very characteristic of the streets of Cadaqués.
- grop: a black rain cloud
- llagut: a small boat
- talaia: an elevated castle or look-out which could warn the village of danger or transmit other signals (example: approaching ships) – compare with the "talaiots" of Menorca.
- xarxi: a (fishing) net, as opposed to "xarxa" in standard Catalan
- Norai: a stone cylindrical building with a large stone on the top that fishermen used to attach their boats.

== Tourism ==
=== Main sights ===
- Salvador Dalí House-Museum
- Church of St. Mary (late-17th century) is the church that most stands out in the views of the town.
- Hermitage of Sant Sebastià, a large house located high on Pení Mountain behind Cadaqués. It is a private residence not open to the public. The hermitage is surrounded by cork trees, and is built on a steep slope.
- Natural Park of Cap de Creus and the lighthouse located at the most easterly point on the mainland of Spain and the Iberian peninsula.

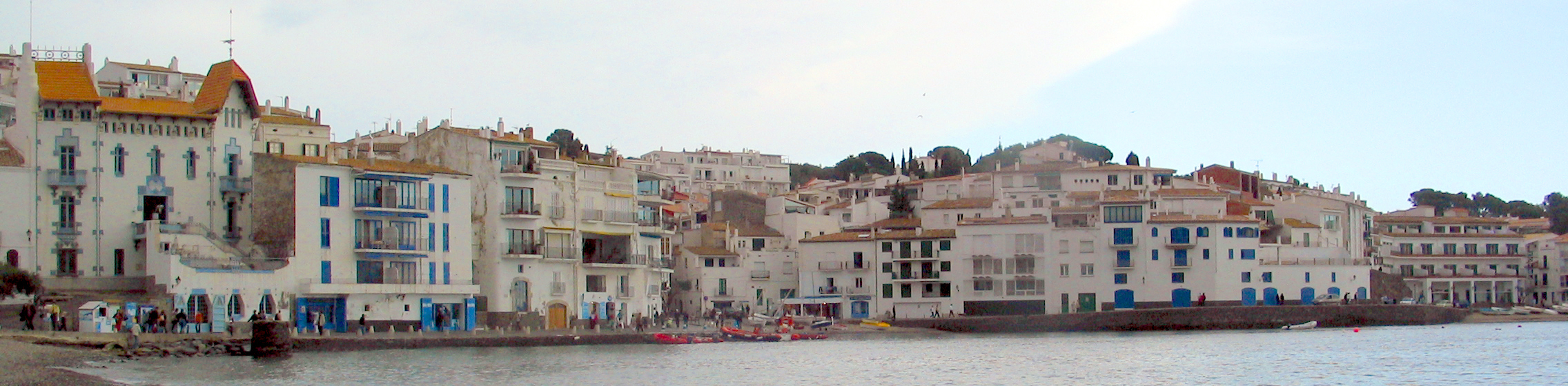
The Cadaqués shoreline

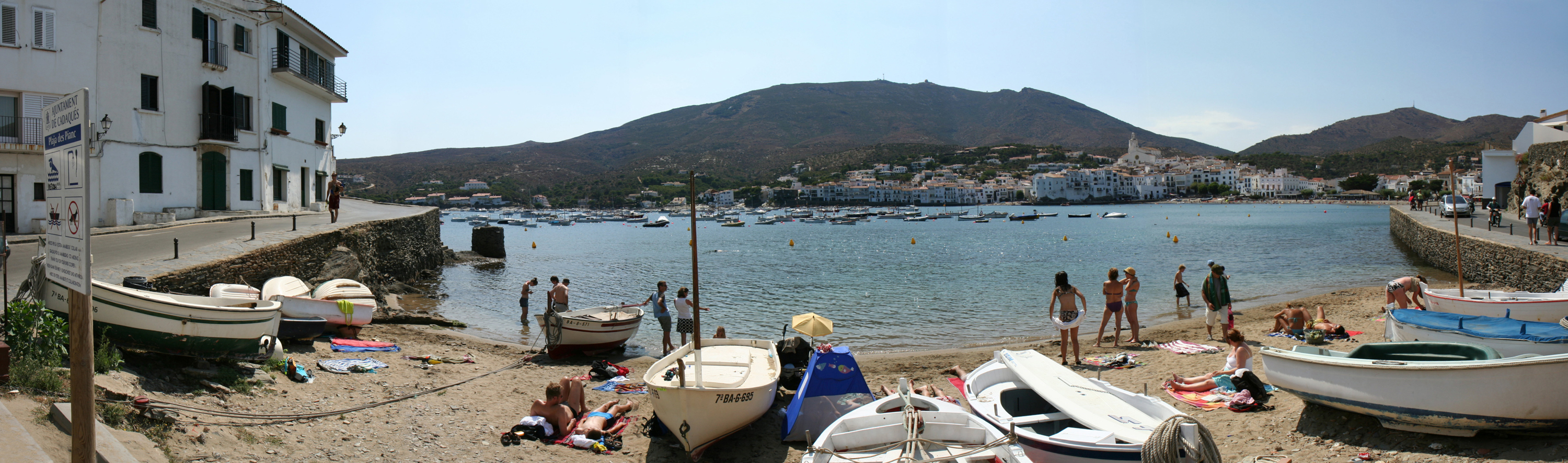
Panorama of Cadaqués

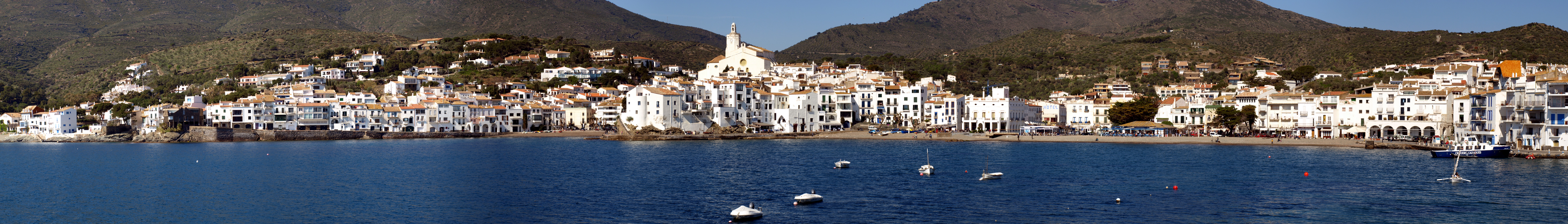
Panorama of Cadaqués

=== Hiking ===
The GR 92 long distance footpath, which roughly follows the length of the Mediterranean coast of Spain, has a staging point at Cadaqués. Stage 2 links northwards to Llançà, a distance of 20.3 kilometres (12.6 mi), whilst stage 3 links southwards to Roses, Girona, a distance of 21.7 kilometres (13.5 mi).

== Geology ==
Cadaqués and the surrounding peninsula known as the Cap de Creus owes its beauty in part to its complex geology. The rocks here were pushed up when the Pyrenees were formed, and are mostly metamorphic schists which turn a golden colour in the Mediterranean sun.

Add to that the weather: this is one of the wildest spots on the Costa Brava in the winter (Costa Brava means "wild coast"), so the migmatites and schists are battered and eroded by the Tramuntana wind which whips off the mountains and by a sea that appears as if it is boiling in the force 8 winds.

The Cadaqués migmatites formed under extreme pressure and temperatures: a partial melt. They are halfway between an igneous and metamorphic rock. The area also contains a lot of schist: a medium grade metamorphic rock that has been flattened into sheets. White blocks of pegmatite mark where molten rock was squeezed through the older metamorphics at the end of the orogeny or mountain building.

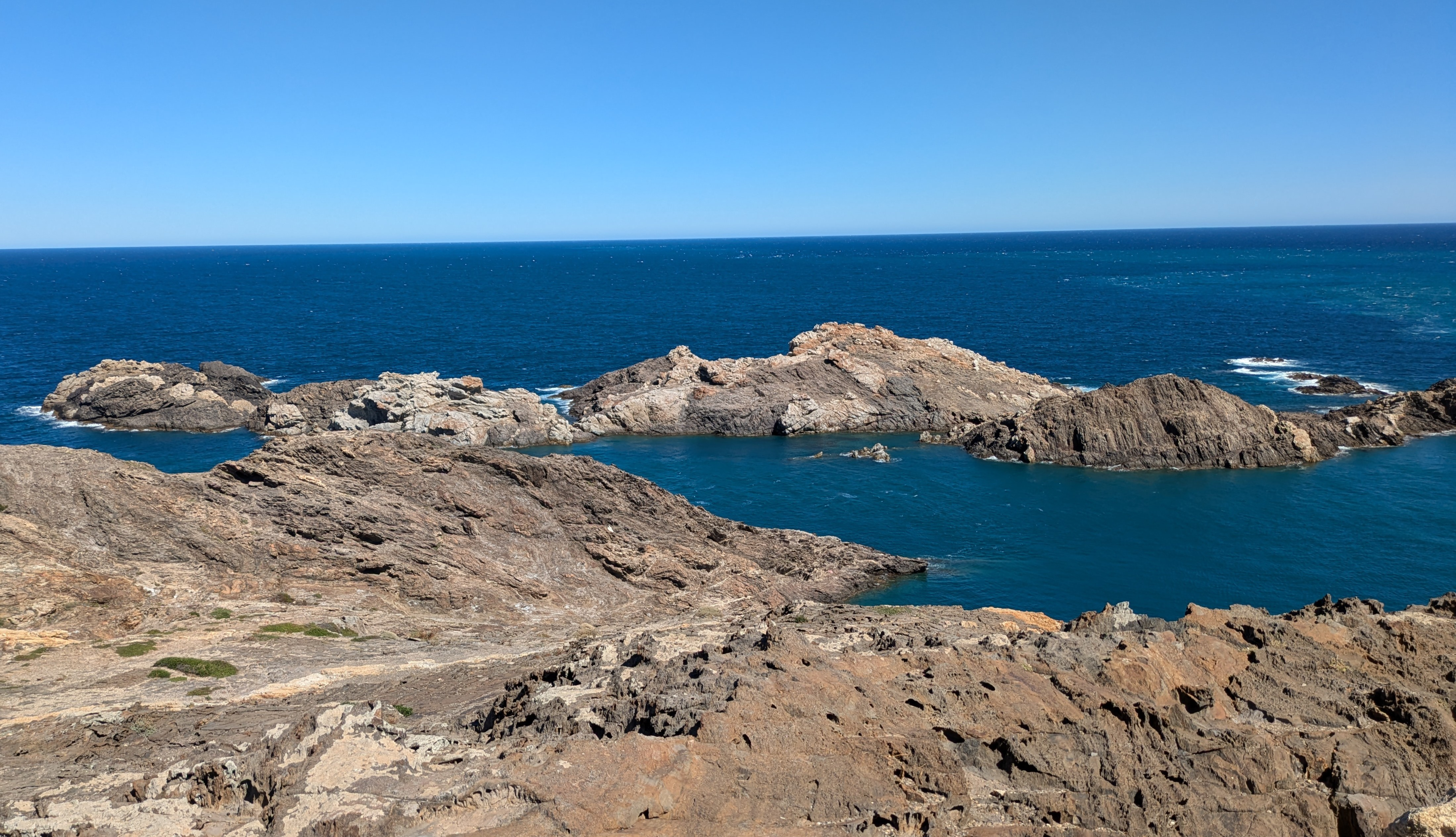
Illa de s'Encalladora, a six hundred metre-long island at the end of the easternmost peninsula of Spain. It consists of pre-Cambrian schist and whitish Hercynian pegmatite veins.

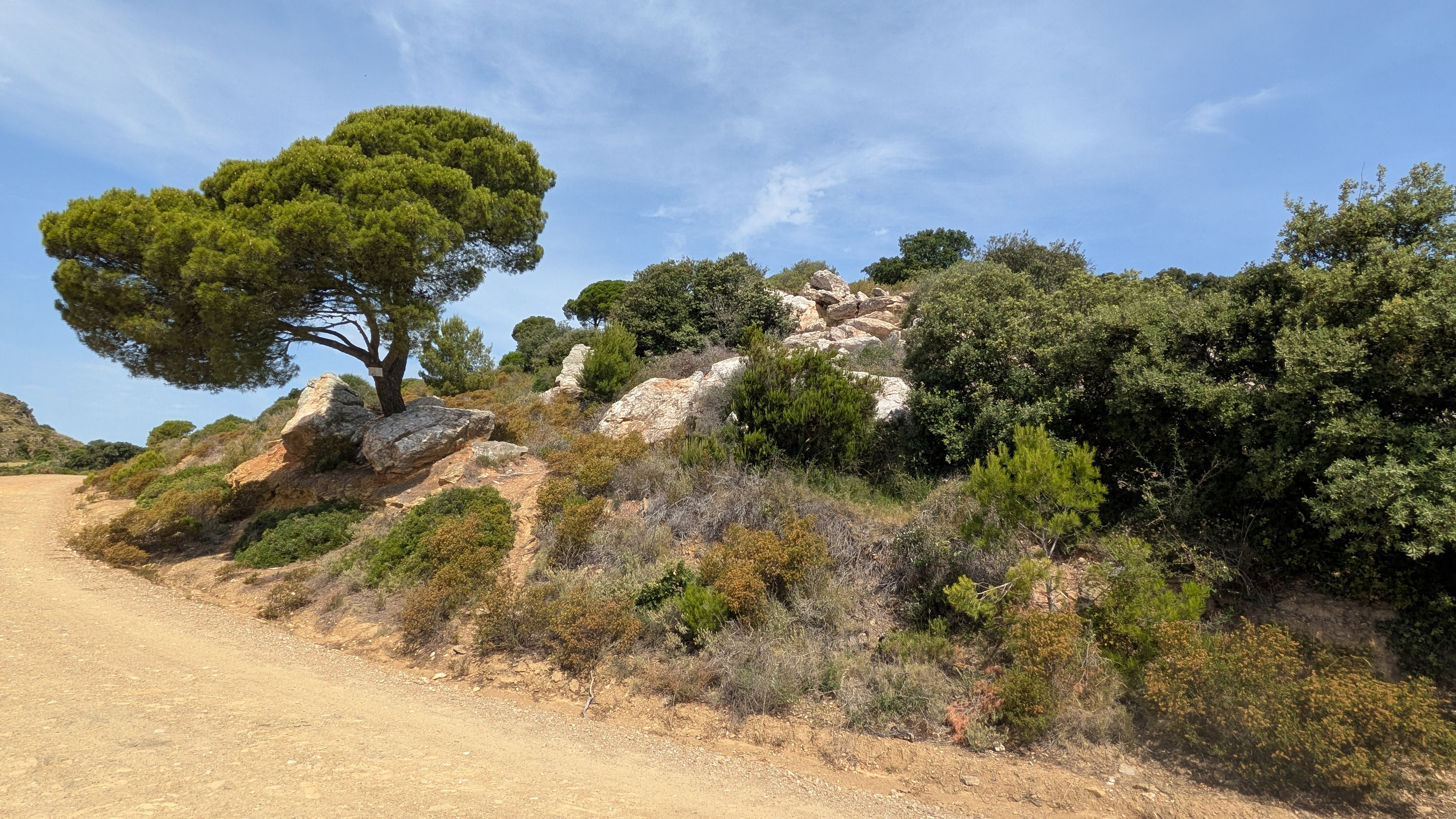
This large quartz vein runs across Cambrian metasediments, south of Cadaqués. Quartz was formerly extracted in a quarry nearby.

The geological history has been exposed by erosion from wind and sea, and many geologists have mapped the area for this reason.

== Chinese replica ==
In 2010, a Chinese developer, China Merchants Zhangzhou, announced its intention to build a near-exact copy of Cadaqués on more than 100 acres (0.40 km^{2}) of land on Xiamen Bay in China. The replica village is projected to house some 15,000 Chinese holidaymakers. Building is reported to begin in September or October 2010. In 2017, the housing development Kadakaisi was still in construction.

== Sources ==
- Galeria Cadaqués, obres de la collecció Bombelli. ISBN 84-89771-31-6. (MACBA 2006) in Catalan
- El Cadaqués de Peter Harnden i Lanfronco Bombelli. ISBN 84-88258-75-5. Col·legi d'Arquitectes de Catalunya
- El Vocabulari de Cadaqués. ISBN 84-87265-60-X, Ernesta sala, Parsifal Edicions, written in Catalan
- Cadaqués. Josep Pla. ISBN 84-261-0701-X. This book is available in Catalan and Spanish.
- Contraband. Josep Pla. About experiences Pla had in running small-time contraband from Cadaqués.
