= El Masnou Municipal Nautical Museum =

Coordinates: 41°28′57.38″N 2°18′52.81″E

- Museu Municipal de Nàutica del Masnou
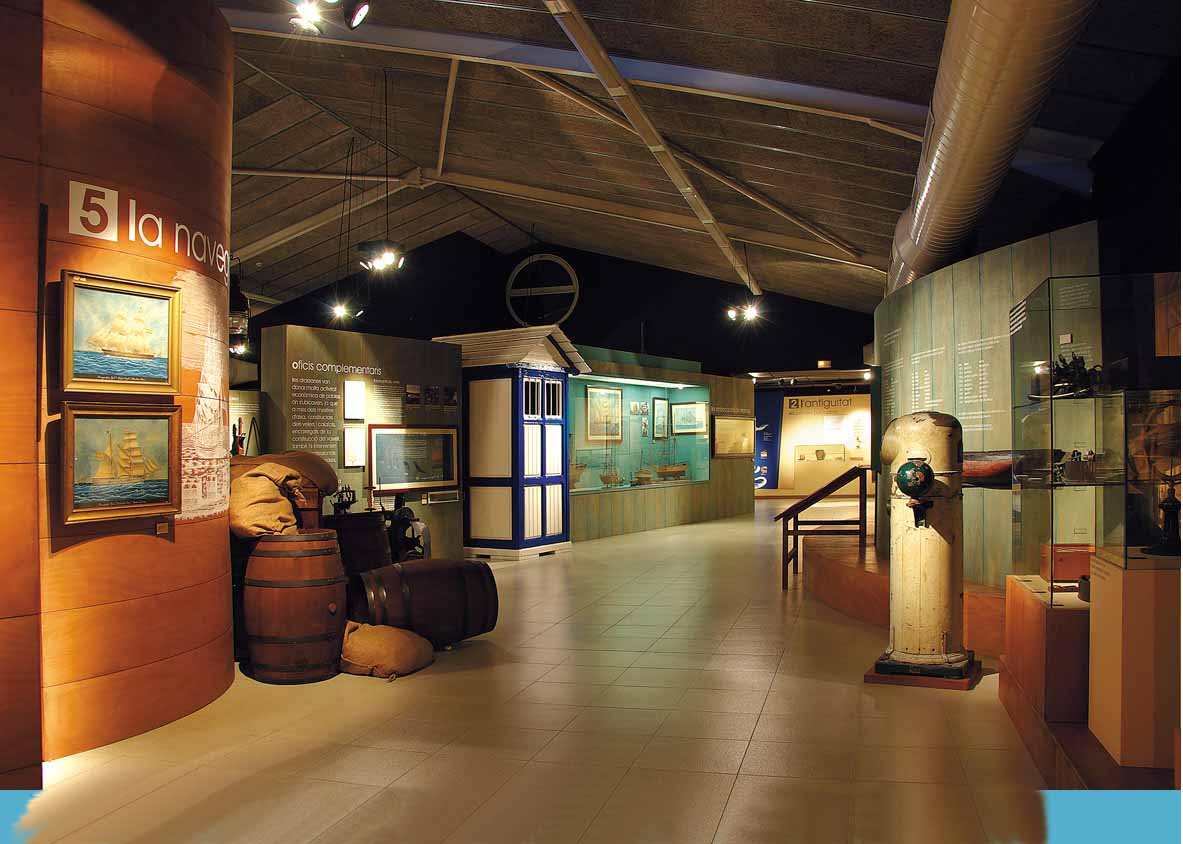
- Interior of the El Masnou Municipal Nautical Museum
- Established: 2005
- Location: El Masnou (Catalonia)
- Type: Maritime museum
- Website: elmasnou.cat/ambit.php?id=6

The El Masnou Municipal Nautical Museum (Catalan: Museu Municipal de Nàutica del Masnou) is a municipally owned museum, the backbone of which is El Masnou’s relationship with the sea. It is part of the Barcelona Provincial Council Local Museum Network, the Maritime Museums of the Catalan Coast Network and the Mediterranean Maritime Museum Association.

== Exhibition ==
The permanent exhibition is organised around the relationship between the town of El Masnou and the sea, and is structured into different areas: La mar blava (The blue sea), L'antiguitat (Antiquity), El naixement d'un poble (The birth of a town), Les embarcacions del Masnou (The boats of El Masnou), La navegació (Sailing), El comerç (Trade), L'herència marinera (The seafaring heritage), and a new area, opened in 2006, with the audiovisual presentation Fem memòria. El Masnou del segle XX (We remember. El Masnou in the 20th century). The museum collection comprises, on the one hand, archaeological materials from prehistoric, Iberian, Roman and Medieval times, and, on the other hand, the artefacts from the nautical world, in particular, sailing instruments, an art gallery with a maritime theme, a vast collection of nautical charts and a specialised library.

The Jordi Pericot Kinetic Art Space is part of the museum and is the only permanent collection of kinetic art in Spain. It is the result of a donation made by artist Jordi Pericot i Canaleta to El Masnou. This space, opened in December 2011, is a modern space where one can see a sample of the whole work of the artist divided into six areas, according to the different stages through which his career has evolved.
