= El Masnou =

- Municipality
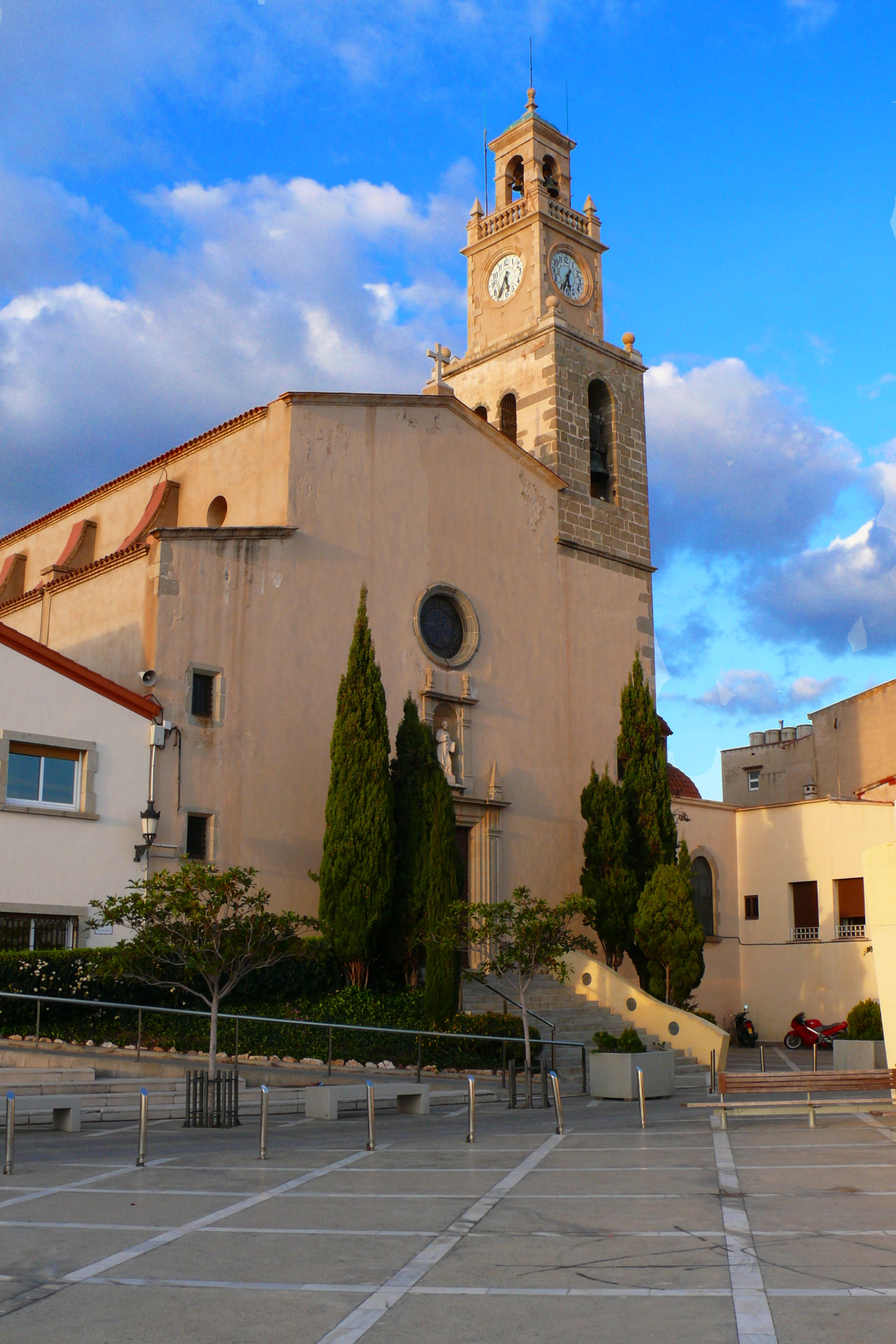

- Flag Coat of arms

- Location in Catalonia El Masnou (Spain)
- Coordinates: 41°28′55″N 2°19′5″E
- Country: Spain
- Community: Catalonia
- Province: Barcelona
- Comarca: Maresme

Government
  - Mayor: Jaume Oliveras Maistany (2015)

Area
  - Total: 3.4 km^{2} (1.3 sq mi)
- Elevation: 27 m (89 ft)

Population (2025-01-01)
  - Total: 24,761
  - Density: 7,300/km^{2} (19,000/sq mi)
- Demonym(s): Masnoví, masnovina
- Website: elmasnou.cat

El Masnou (Catalan for 'the new farmhouse'; pronounced [əl məzˈnɔw]) is a municipality in the province of Barcelona, Catalonia, Spain. It is situated on the coast between Montgat and Premià de Mar, to the north-east of the city of Barcelona, in the comarca (county) of el Maresme. The town is both a tourist centre and a dormitory town in the Barcelona metropolitan area.

The main N-II road and a Renfe railway line run through the town, while a local road links it with the A-19 autopista at Alella.

The town center has buildings in a wide range of styles: neoclassical, modernista, noucentista and simply eclectic. The municipal museum has collections of archeology and of Catalan ceramics, and there is also a private museum of pharmacy and medicine. A Roman village called Cal Ros de les Cabres was one of the first settlements located on the site of the current town.

The agriculture of El Masnou is mainly of flowers, especially carnations, and the industry has a predominance of textile, with several industries about ceramics, glass and pharmaceutical products.

== Demography ==
1900	1930	1950	1970	1986	2007
3396	4604	5098	10,410	15,169	21,935

== Historical and interesting buildings ==
- Casa de la Vila. Neoclassical style town hall of the architect Miquel Garriga i Roca.
- Museu Cusí de Farmàcia. Museum of Pharmacy which is the exponent of the historical and museological vocation of a pharmacist, Joaquim Cusí and Furtunet.
- El Masnou Municipal Nautical Museum. Museum which permanent exhibition is organised around the relationship between the town of El Masnou and the sea.
- Casa del Marquès del Masnou. This building belonged to Romà Fabra i Puig, who received the title of Marquis of El Masnou in 1922.

== Notable people ==
Current basketball star Ricky Rubio was born in El Masnou. Also Bruno Saltor Grau, a professional football coach and former player who is currently a coach for West Ham United.

Other famous people who were born in El Masnou are:

- Ricky Rubio (1990), First round draft pick of the NBA.
- Fèlix Oliver (1856–1932), a pioneer of cinema in Uruguay.
- Lluís Millet i Pagès (1867–1941), musician, founder of the Catalan choir Orfeó Català.
- Rosa Sensat (1873–1961), teacher who contributed to the development of the Catalan public schools during the first third of the 20th century.
- Jordi Pericot i Canaleta (1931), plastic artist and designer.
- Jordi Pagans i Monsalvatje (1932–2017), contemporary figurative painter, cousin of the renowned classical music composer Xavier Montsalvatge i Bassols.
