= Jordi Pagans i Monsalvatje =

Spanish painter

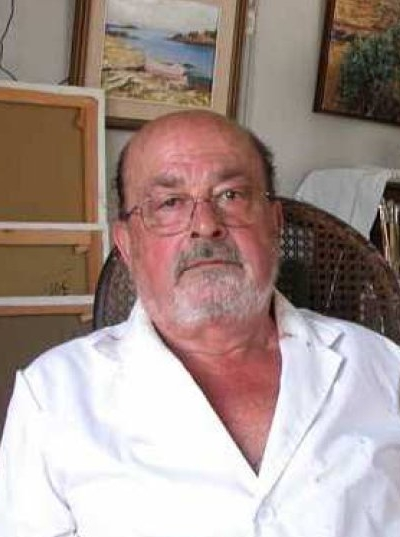
- Jordi Pagans
- Born: Jordi Pagans i Monsalvatje; 18 April 1932; El Masnou, Barcelona, Spain
- Died: 4 January 2017 (aged 84); Barcelona, Spain
- Known for: Painting, Drawing
- Movement: Figurative, Realistic

Jordi Pagans i Monsalvatje (18 April 1932 – 4 January 2017) was a Catalan and Spanish painter.

== Biography ==
=== Artistic Tradition ===
Pagans was born in El Masnou, on 18 April 1932. Son of Alfred Pagans i Llauró and Clara Monsalvatje i Iglèsias, both coming from families of a long and rich artistic tradition which included members such as the guitar player and singer Llorenç Pagans i Julià (1838–83), brother of his grand grandfather, and good friend of Wagner and Edgar Degas' father. In several Degas’ paintings, the chanteur Pagans is portrayed alongside the painter's father.

Also, his grandfather, Francesc Monsalvatje i Fossas (1853–1917), developed important historical studies about the ancient Country of Besalú. Not to forget his uncle Xavier Monsalvatje i Iglèsias (1881–1921), writer and painter, and finally his cousin Xavier Montsalvatge i Bassols (1911–2002), who is considered the most important Catalan composer of his generation.

=== Artistic career ===
Jordi Pagans began painting in 1948. In 1950 he studies with Saturo López and assists to night classes in the School of Fine Arts of Barcelona. In 1956 he works in the "atelier" of Josep Roca Sastre, whose teachings and orientation are decisive in his formative years. The paintings of this period show that Pagans was already a master expressing the essentials, using as his own the concepts of impressionist and cubist schools. In 1955, he spends a couple of months in Paris, visiting the Louvre and the Jeu de Paume Museums, walking and taking sketches of the great Parisian avenues and boulevards.

He began exhibiting his work in group shows in 1953. He gains early recognition receiving in 1956 the Royal Circle Artistic Award from the Council of Barcelona and the "Rafael Llimona" Award in 1959, year in which he makes his first solo exhibit in the Municipal Gallery of Girona. In 1961 his work is shown for the first time in the "Club dels Quatre Vents" in Paris. The Ateneu Barcelonés shows his work in January 1962. Since then, his work has been exhibited continuously till the present (currently he is exhibiting in Girona).

In the 60's he keeps a close friendship with painter and historian Rafael Benet i Vancells (1899–1979) whose teachings were decisive. Rafael Benet enjoyed sharing time with young artists and considered Pagans one of his very favourites. The group that gathered at the café-restaurant "El Glaciar" of the Ramblas in Barcelona included Benet, Pagans, Humbert, Prim, Pruna and Alfred Figueres, among others. In 1963 he takes part of the "Realitat Visual" group, whose ideas about painting may be summarised as: painting should be a never-ending state of crisis between intelligence and the sensible as well as between knowledge and the feeling of reality.

Between 1963 and 1965, Jordi Pagans began visiting Cadaqués, a small town on the northern coast of Catalonia, Spain. The local landscape influenced his artistic focus, and the area became a frequent subject of his work. Following this period, his paintings consistently featured structured, distinct masses, alongside a realistic and figurative composition style.

== Artistic Style ==

Through his career, Jordi Pagans had worked and investigated with different materials to paint his urban and Mediterranean landscapes and still lifes. He distinguished himself as an oil painter as well as a draftsman, watercolorist, and painter in pastel and gouache. He also produced graphic works using a variety of techniques, most notably etching.

== Exhibitions ==
1959: Sala Municipal d'Exposicions, Girona; 1961: "Le Club des Quatre Vents", Paris; 1962: Ateneu Barcelonès, Barcelona; 1963: Sala Vayreda, Barcelona; 1966: Sala Vayreda, Barcelona; 1967: Casa de Cultura, Girona; 1968: Sala de la Caixa de Pensions, Girona; 1969: Sala Vayreda, Barcelona; 1970: Casa de Cultura, Girona; 1971: Sala Vayreda, Barcelona; Sala de la Caixa de Pensions, Girona; 1972: Gallery Les Voltes, Olot; L'Hostal, Cadaqués; Sala Vall Paradís, Terrassa; 1973: Sala Vayreda, Barcelona; Sala Municipal d'Exposicions, Girona; 1974: Art gallery Meliá Castilla, Madrid; Gallery Shalom Art. Oviedo; 1975: Sala Vall Paradís, Terrassa; Sala Vayreda, Barcelona; Gallery Prisma, Vilanova i la Geltrú; 1976: Sala d'Art Sant Jordi, Girona; Gallery Agora-3, Sitges; Gallery Les Voltes, Olot; Gallery Hisa, Manresa; Gallery La Finestra Oberta, Lleida; 1977: Sala de la Caixa de Pensions, Puigcerdà; Centre de Lectura, Reus; Madei, Sala d'Art, Barcelona; Gallery d'Alaró, Sitges; Gallery Actis, Sant Feliu de Guíxols; 1978: Art gallery Sant Lluc, Olot	Art gallery L'Amistat, Cadaqués; Gallery Sant Pol, Sant Joan de les Abadesses; Gallery Art-3, Figueres; Art gallery d'Ara, Igualada; 1979: Gallery Maifrén, Barcelona; Gallery U, Cadaqués; Gallery Agora-3, Sitges; Sala Navarro, Barcelona; 1980: Sala Gòtica d'Art, Lleida; Sala d'Art Galera, Reus; Gallery Sant Lluc, Olot; Cercle Artístic, Tortosa; Centre del Comerç, Tortosa; Art gallery Sant Jordi, Girona; Art gallery d'Ara, Igualada; 1981: Gallery Arxiu Tobella, Terrassa; Gallery Coso-34, Huéscar; Gallery La Gavina, Palamós; Gallery Sacharoff, Barcelona; Centre del Comerç, Tortosa; 1982: Sala Dalmau, Barcelona; Art gallery L'Amistat, Cadaqués; Niu d'Art, Vilassar de Dalt; 1983: Art gallery Terra Ferma, Lleida; Gallery Clariana, Vic; Art-2, Palafrugell; Museu de Vilafranca del Penedès; Centre de Comerç, Tortosa; 1984: Sala d'Art "La Caixa", Caldes de Montbui; Sala Dalmau, Barcelona; Gallery La Gavina, Palamós; Gallery Sa Llumenera, Cadaqués; Art gallery Terra Ferma, Lleida; 1985: Sala d'Art Aida, Terrassa; Gallery Sant Lluc, Olot; Sala d'Art Port Lligat, Cadaqués; Gallery Espuña, Sant Feliu de Guíxols; Centre de Comerç, Tortosa; 1986: Sala Dalmau, Barcelona; Sala Renoir, Zaragoza; Sala d'Art L'Amistat, Cadaqués; Centre de Comerç, Tortosa	1987: Andorra Art Galery, Andorra la Vella; Sala Aida, Terrassa; Sala Dalmau, Barcelona; 1988: Sala Clariana, Vic; Art gallery Port Lligat, Cadaqués; Centre de Comerç, Tortosa; 1989: Gallery Ivee. Bumm, Düsseldorf; 1990: Gallery Dalmau, Barcelona; Art gallery Port Lligat, Cadaqués; Art gallery l'Artística, Girona; 1991: Art gallery Atelier, Barcelona; Art gallery Agora-3, Sitges; Art gallery Carma, Platja d'Aro; 1992: Centre de Comerç Sala d'Art, Tortosa; 1993: Sala Art Petritxol, Barcelona; Sala d'Art Conxa López, Torredembarra; 1994: Rembrandt Tot Art, Vilanova i la Geltrú; Art gallery Les Voltes, Olot; 1995: Sala Art Petritxol, Barcelona; 1996: Dillon Galery, London; Art gallery L’Artística. Girona; 1999: Sala Art Petritxol, Barcelona; 2000: Art gallery Les Voltes, Olot. Girona; Art gallery La Riba, Cadaqués; 2001: Sala Art Petritxol, Barcelona; 2003: Art gallery Àgora 3, Sitges; 2004: Sala Art Petritxol, Barcelona; 2005: Art gallery La Riba, Cadaqués; 2006: Art gallery Àgora 3, Sitges; 2007: Art gallery Àgora 3, Sitges; 2013: Sala Art Petritxol, Barcelona

== Awards ==
- 1956 "Real Círculo Artístico" award, Concourse of new painters, Barcelona council
- 1959 Young painting award "Rafael Llimona", Sala Parés, Barcelona
- 1967 Honor diploma "XI Salon de Mayo", Barcelona
- 1968 Second prize in the painting concourse "Vila de Centelles"
- 1969 Third position in the Vallès art meeting, Granollers First position in the painting concourse, and "Vila de Centelles Second position in the "National" concourse of Amposta
- 1972 "María Grifé" award, VII Concourse "Vila de Palamós"
- 1974 "Ministerio de la Vivienda" prize IX Concourse "Vila de Palamós"
- 1975 "María Trías" award (in memorial), "Vila de Palamós"
- 1980 "Ciudad de Huesca" diploma, IV Biennal Nacional de Huesca
- 1982 Special mention (Official diploma), Sala de Avignon, France Honorifical mention in the VIII Biennal of Vilafranca del Penedès

== Bibliography ==
- Diccionari Biogràfic Contemporani. Ed. Círculo de Amigos de la Historia. Madrid, 1970
- Centenari del Centre Excursionista de Catalunya. Homenatge dels Artistes Catalans. Ed. Centre Excursionista de Catalunya. Barcelona, 1976
- Gran Enciclopèdia Catalana, vol. 11. Ed. Enciclopèdia Catalana. Barcelona, 1978
- Espinàs, J.M.: Visions de Cadaqués. 33 gravats de J. Pagans i Monsalvatje, pòrtic de Jordi Benet i Aurell. Ed. Gabinet d'Art, Grup 33. Olot, 1978 (edició de bibliòfil)
- Diccionari "Ràfols" de Artistes de Catalunya, Balears i València. Ed. "La Gran Enciclopèdia Vasca". Barcelona, 1979
- Pagans Monsalvatje. Biblioteca "Maestros actuales de la pintura y escultura catalanas", vol. 45. Jordi Benet. Ed. "La Gran Enciclopèdia Vasca". Barcelona, 1979, 52 Pág.
- Fontbona, F.: El Paisatgisme a Catalunya.
- Tharrats, J.J.: Cent anys de pintura a Cadaqués. Ed. Cotal. Barcelona, 1981
- Amir, X.: Els pintors de la Costa Brava avui. Ed. Xavier Amir. Barcelona, 1982
- Santos Torroella, R. (Dir.): Enciclopèdia Vivent de la Pintura i l'Escultura Catalanes, vol. VII. Ed. Àmbit. Barcelona, 1985
- Portada de la "Revista Gal. Art", Barcelona, no. 14, May 1985
- Plana, M. (Dir.): Homenatge a Josep Pla. Ed. Miquel Plana. Olot, 1989 (edició de bibliòfil)
- Sabata Serra, X. (Dir.): Guia d' Art 1991. Ed. Art Book 90 S. L. Barcelona, 1991
- Coromina, V. (Dir.): 90 Artistes dels 90. Ed. Art Invest. S.A., Genève, 1992
- Sabata Serra, X. (Dir.): Guia d’Art 1994. Ed. Art 85 S.L. Barcelona
- Encuentro con el Arte: Pintores y escultores Espanyoles. Ed. Angélica Guevara. Barcelona. 1995
- Sabata Serra, X. (Dir.): Guia d’Art 1995-1996. Ed. Art 85 S. L. Barcelona
- Historia de L’Art Català: Segle XX Volumen IX. Ed. 62. Author F. Gutierrez
- Cent Paisatgistes: Josep Mª Cadena. Edicions Vicens Coromina. Barcelona, 1997
- Artistes del 99: Edicions Vicens Coromina. Barcelona, 1999
- Pintores y escultores: Encuentro con las artes. Ed. Angélica Guevara. Barcelona, 2000
- Figures: Josep Mª Cadena. Edicions Vicens Coromina. Barcelona, 2000
- Artistas y Pintores de España. Edició Vicens Coromina. Edicions d’Art 2001
- Interiors: Josep Mª Cadena. Edicions Vicens Coromina. Barcelona, 2003
- Pagans Monsalvatje: Josep Mª Cadena. Barcelona, 2013
