= Néstor Martín-Fernández de la Torre =

Spanish painter

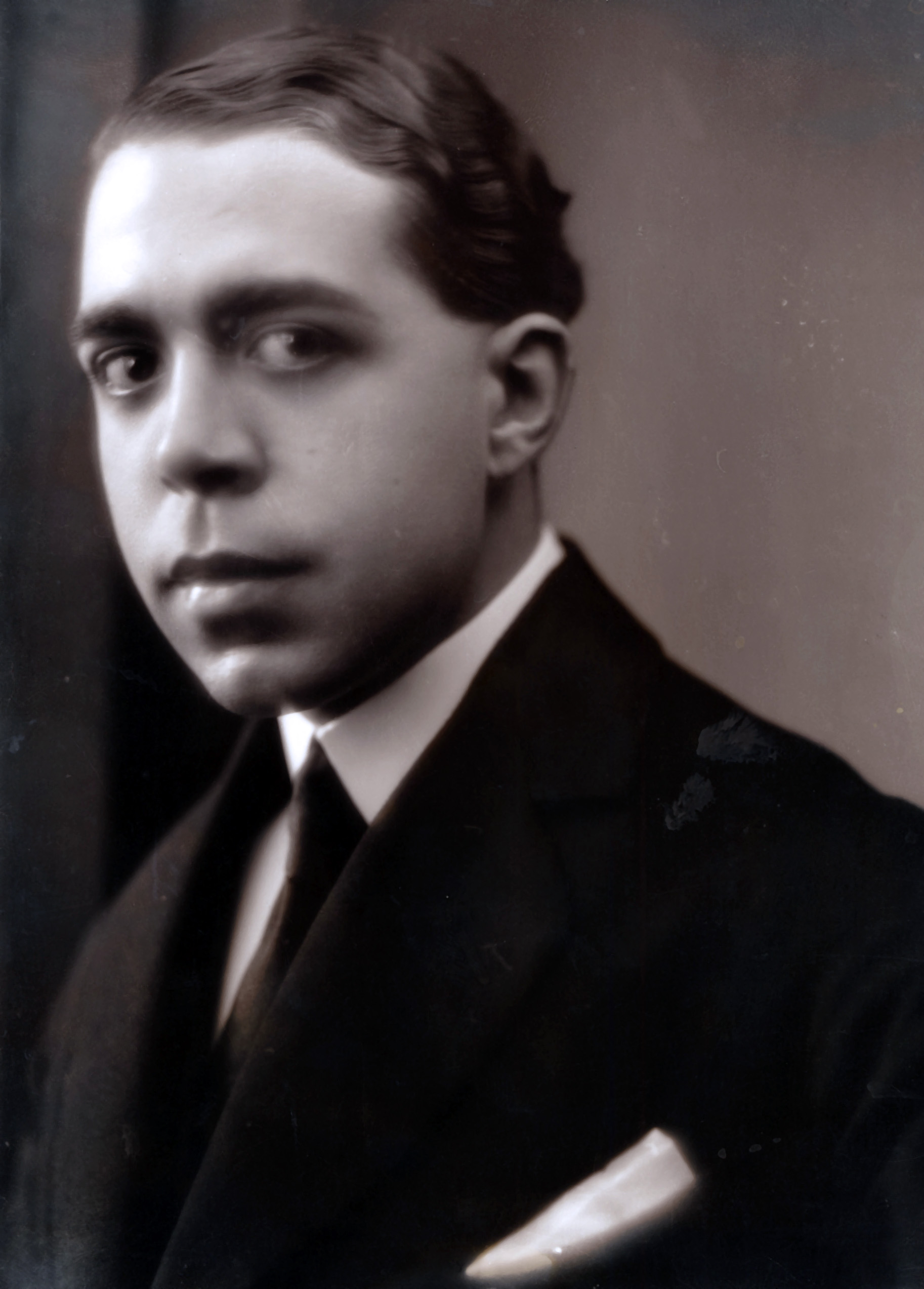
Néstor Martín-Fernández de la Torre (1910)

Néstor Martín-Fernández de la Torre, generally known simply as Néstor (4 May 1887, Las Palmas de Gran Canaria – 6 February 1938, Las Palmas de Gran Canaria) was a Canarian painter and theatrical designer who worked in the Symbolist and Art Deco styles.

== Biography ==
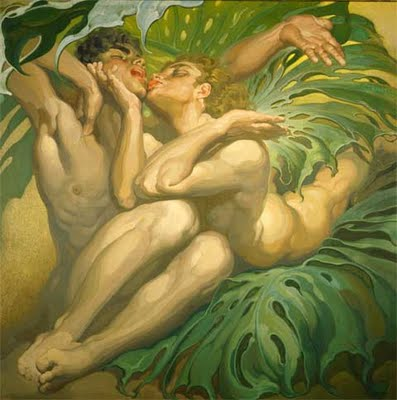
Spring (1910)

He began his artistic development at the age of seven, when he attended the "Colegio San Agustín" and was given drawing lessons by Nicolás Massieu (1876–1954), who would later become a well-known painter. In 1899, he received his first formal art instruction from the peripatetic Spanish landscape painter Eliseu Meifrèn.

When still only fifteen, he received a grant from the city of Las Palmas to study in Madrid, but the entrance exams for the Academia were too difficult, so he taught himself by making copies in the Museo del Prado. He eventually found a position in the workshop of Rafael Hidalgo de Caviedes. He then travelled extensively, visiting París, Brussels and London, among other places, to perfect his technique. While in Paris, he also designed theater sets and clothing.

He established a studio in Barcelona in 1907 and his first exhibition came in 1908, at the "Círculo Ecuestre", a sporting and social club, where he displayed a series of portraits, influenced by his stay in England. The following year, he presented four decorative panels at the Sala Parés, which he had designed for the dance hall in Tibidabo, inspired by the poems of Jacinto Verdaguer.

He continued to exhibit widely, in Paris and London, as well as Madrid. In 1915, he had his solo début as a theatrical designer, creating sets and costumes for a production of El amor brujo by Manuel de Falla in Madrid. He moved his studios to Paris in 1928 and did more designing for ballets, operas and other productions, including costumes for Cécile Sorel, Grace Moore and Conchita Supervía.

Due to the First World War, which curtailed his artistic activity in Paris and London, Néstor returned to his native Las Palmas de Gran Canaria at the age of 29. In the years that followed, he combined painting with sustained teaching activity, giving drawing lessons to young members of the local bourgeoisie. One of the venues where these lessons took place was the Casa de las Almenas, also known as Casa Cigala, in the Vegueta district, where Nicolás Díaz-Saavedra, who later became mayor of the city, was among his students. Sketchbooks preserved from this period record these sessions, featuring drawings by Néstor himself as well as by several of his pupils.

During his time in Paris (1928–1934), Néstor lived and worked closely with his partner, the composer and future military leader Gustavo Durán, who served as his manager and secretary. Their relationship, documented in letters and a shared diary now held by the Museo Néstor, ended shortly before Néstor's return to Las Palmas in 1934.

After more travelling, including excursions through the Spanish colonies in Africa, he returned to Las Palmas and established a studio there in 1934. In addition to his paintings, he decorated the "Casino de Tenerife" in Santa Cruz and the "Teatro Pérez Galdós" in Las Palmas and initiated a campaign to promote tourism, which he called "Tipismo" (picturesqueness). On February 6, 1938, he died suddenly from complications related to pneumonia, leaving several major projects unfinished.

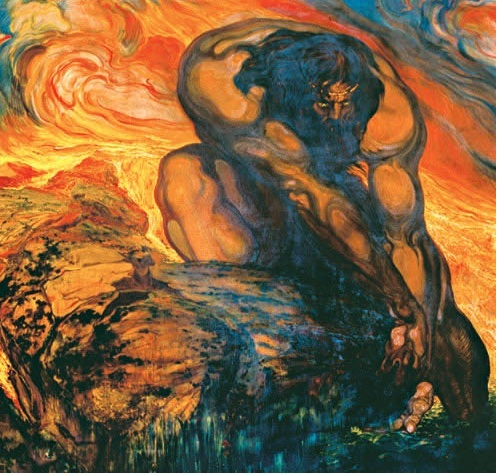
Hercules (1920)

In 1956, the "Museo Néstor" was inaugurated in the city centre of Las Palmas. It is located in the "Pueblo Canario", a cultural complex designed by his brother, Miguel Martín-Fernández de la Torre, an architect. The complex includes decorations by Néstor and contains the majority of his works.
