= Jordi Pericot i Canaleta =

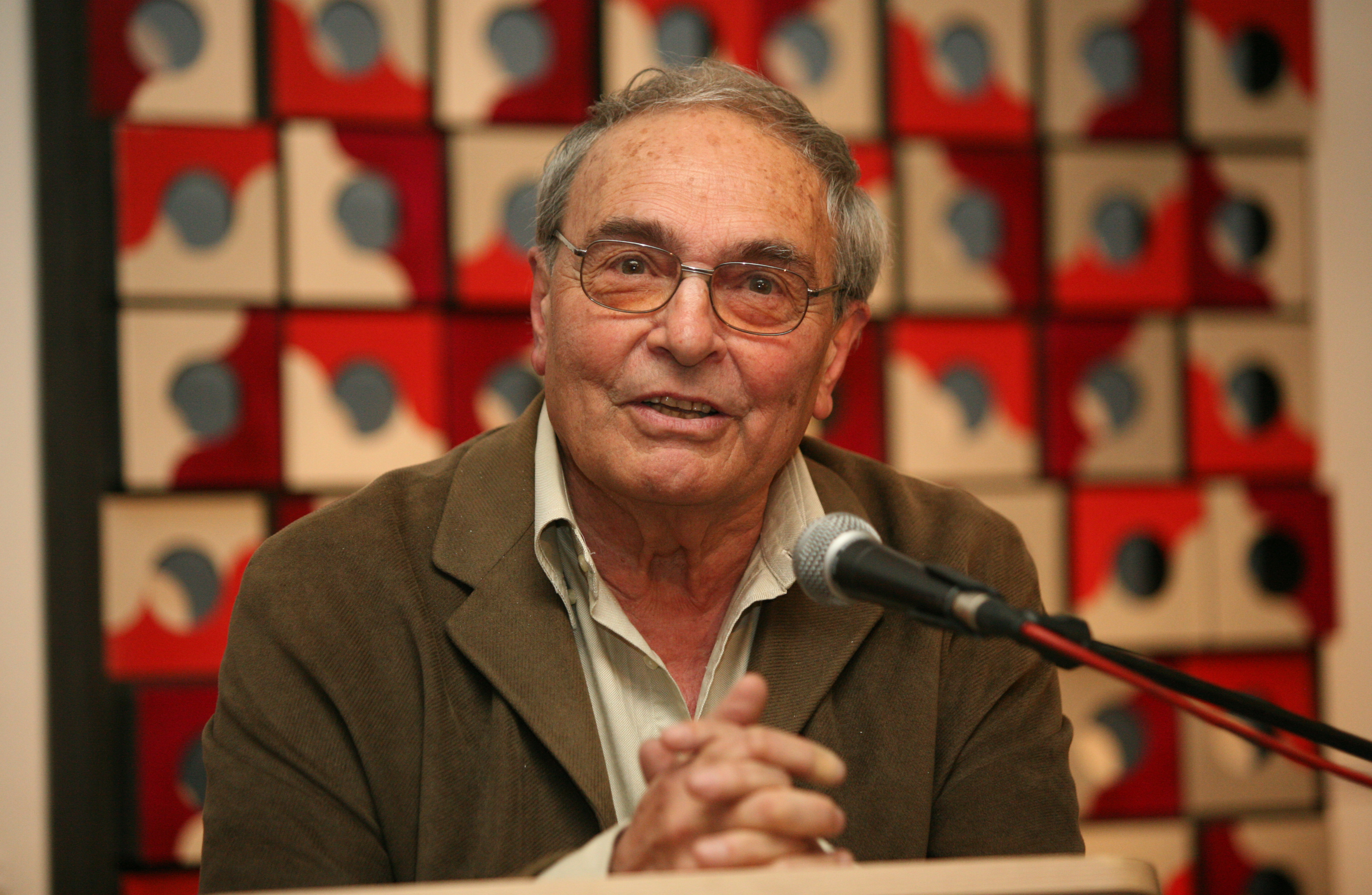
- Jordi Pericot in 2007
- Born: 16 November 1931 (age 93); El Masnou, Spain
- Occupation(s): Plastic artist and designer

Jordi Pericot i Canaleta (born November 16, 1931, in El Masnou, Barcelona, Spain) is a Spanish plastic artist and designer.

== Biography ==
Brother of the painter and set designer Santiago Pericot i Canaleta and son of the teacher Maria Canaleta i Abellà, he studied at the Normal School of Barcelona and at the Faculty of Letters and at the School of Fine Arts in Toulouse (France). He graduated in philosophy at the University of Barcelona and French language at the University of Toulouse. He also obtained the title of doctor in art history at the University of Barcelona.

In 1958 he moved to France, where he introduced himself to experimental film techniques and began his artistic career. Between 1960 and 1967 he lived in Paris and dedicated himself to art, teaching and experimental cinema.

At the end of the sixties, it prioritized the most theoretical and teaching research field. In 1968, again in Barcelona, he was appointed director of the Elisava design school (a position he would hold until 1980), where he began a long research on visual communication that culminated in a thesis dedicated to this specialty. In Barcelona he maintains an outstanding artistic and cultural activity, especially in the search for kinetic art. He created the group MENTE ("Spanish Exhibition of New Aesthetic Trends"), which brings together personalities such as Oriol Bohigas, Ricard Bofill, Ricard Salvat, Josep Mestres Quadreny or Daniel Giralt-Miracle, and introduces the concepts he had cultivated in Paris in participatory and non-commercial artistic creation.

In 1972 he represents Spain at the 36th Venice Biennale, opportunity that opens a door for him in the international art field.

In 1980 he became professor of design at the University of Barcelona (1980-1991). Later on, he became professor of audiovisual communication at Pompeu Fabra University (1991-2001), where he is subsequently appointed vice-chancellor, and later professor emeritus. In addition, he is a full member of the Reial Acadèmia Catalana de Belles Arts de Sant Jordi, member of the Real Academia de Bellas Artes de Santa Isabel de Hungría in Seville and the Gold Medal of Cultural Merit of the City of Barcelona.

== Work ==
His plastic work tries to go beyond pure optical and kinetic research to get an analysis of perceptual laws and their communicative value. Through form and color, emptiness and light, it produces various three-dimensional constructions subject to the laws of permutation, variation and repetition.

He has exhibited in Barcelona, Madrid, Bilbao, the Canary Islands, Valencia, France, Germany, Italy and the USA. Currently, his work is represented in the contemporary art museums of Madrid, Ottawa, Seville, Iowa, Ibiza, Helsinki and Santiago de Chile, among others. The town of El Masnou, where he was born and raised, has dedicated a space called "Jordi Pericot Kinetic Art Space", within the El Masnou Municipal Nautical Museum. It is the only permanent space dedicated to the author and the only permanent collection of kinetic art in Spain. His work is currently on show at Baubo art gallery in El Masnou, his hometown.
