= Rosa Sensat =

Spanish teacher

Rosa Sensat i Vilà
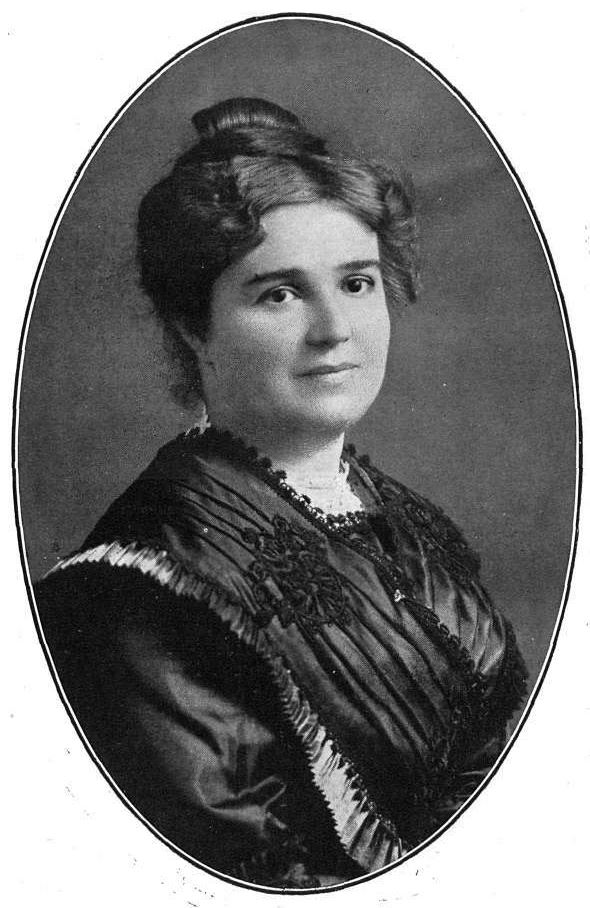
- Born: June 17, 1873; El Masnou, Maresme
- Died: October 1, 1961 (aged 88); Barcelona
- Occupation: Educator

Rosa Sensat i Vilà (17 June 1873 – 1 October 1961) was a Spanish teacher. She contributed to the development of the Catalan public schools during the first third of the 20th century.

== Biography ==
She undertook education studies in Barcelona and in Madrid's Escuela Central de Magisterio (Central Education Studies School). Afterwards she studied at Geneva's Institut Rousseau and other European schools, where she learnt about new educational trends.

In 1900, she passed the public examinations so to become a housework headmistress in Alacant. However, she married David Ferrer in 1903, and the couple moved to Barcelona. The year after, their first daughter, Àngels Ferrer i Sensat was born.

Sensat spread the new educational trends, and in 1914 she became the first director of the girls' section of Barcelona's Escola de Bosc. In 1921 she was commissioned to design the studies program for Barcelona's Institut de Cultura i Biblioteca Popular de la Dona, a cultural centre created in 1909 by Francesca Bonnemaison which was the first centre in Europe especially focused on women's cultural and working education. During that period, Sensat gave courses and conferences for Mancomunitat de Catalunya's educational programs, in summer schools, and also in Institut de Cultura i Biblioteca Popular de la Dona. She also participated in several international conferences on education, such as the 1st National Conference on Primary Education (Barcelona, 1909), the 3rd International Conference on Enseignement Menager (Paris, 1922), and the Écoles Nouvelles conference (Nice, 1932).

Sensat held the Escola de Bosc headmaster position until 1930, when she became the director of Barcelona's Grup Escolar Milà i Fontanals. Severely affected by the Spanish Civil War, she retired in 1939.

A group of teachers created the Escola de Mestres Rosa Sensat (Rosa Sensat teaching school) in 1955, in acknowledgement of Sensat's work regarding the spreading of new educational trends and her ability to manage schools.

== See also ==
- Maria Montessori
