= Jacint Morera =

Spanish painter

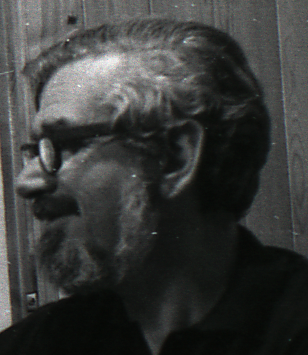
Jacint Morera

Morera, Jacint (16 November 1915 in Terrassa (Barcelona) – 1 July 1989 in Calonge (Girona)) was a painter, caricaturist, and muralist. He was a founding member of the First October Salon of Barcelona, 1948, at the Galeries Laietanes, along with Albert Ràfols Casamada, Antoni Tàpies, Francesc Todó, Pere Tort et al.

In the Second October Salon in 1949 Morera was among four painters selected for comment by the critic Eugénie d'Ors: 'The Composition by Jacint Morera is pyramidal like those of Andrea del Sarto, who was called, because of the precision of his geometry, Andrea senza errori.'

Morera's work falls into distinct periods (Marc Molins, Jacint Morera Una Retrospectiva, 1984): the first constructivist period 1935-1953; the colourist period 1963-1970; and the second constructivist period 1975-1987.

His work is typically constructed according to 'golden proportions' which endow his paintings with a weightiness and solidity, yet they have also a lightness and subtlety (José Corredor-Matheos, 'Transparencia de Jacint Morera'). Similarly, an intellectual coolness combined with power and passion. He achieves his effects usually through an economy of materials.

The above is from Roger Noël Smith, The Paintings of Jacint Morera (1990)

Exposició 'Els salts artístics de Jacint Morera' Terrassa

Exhibition: 'The Artistic Leaps of Jacint Morera' at the Centre Cultural de Terrassa (Barcelona) 15 November 2010 - 9 January 2011
