= Ramon Pichot =

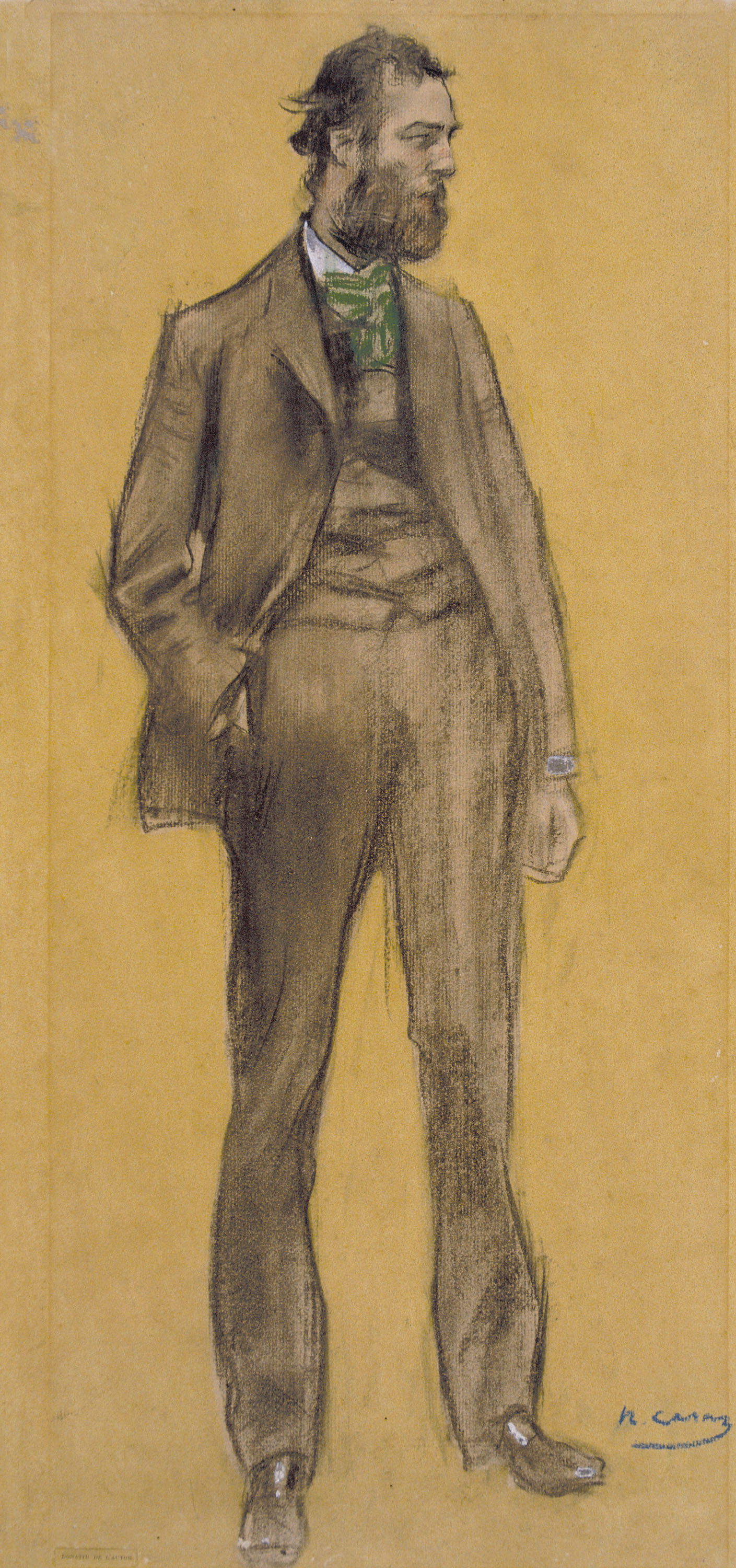
Pichot seen by Ramon Casas (MNAC)

Ramon Pichot Gironès (Catalan pronunciation: [rəˈmom piˈtʃɔt]; 1871 – 1 March 1925) was a Catalan and Spanish artist. He painted in an impressionist style.

He was a good friend of Pablo Picasso and an early mentor to young Salvador Dalí. Dalí met Pichot in Cadaqués, Spain, when Dalí was only 10 years old. Pichot also made many trips to France, and once in a while, Dalí and his family would go on a trip with Pichot and his family.

He married Germaine Pichot, a well-known artist's model, in 1906. Together they had a restaurant near the Bateau Lavoir, called La maison rose. Pichot left Paris after World War I but returned often to buy books, as he had turned into a bibliophile. On such a trip, he suddenly died on 1 March 1925. Picasso was so shaken by this that he included Pichot's figure in the painting "Three Dancers", on which he was working at the time.

In The Autobiography of Alice B. Toklas, Gertrude Stein describes Pichot as follows:

...Spanish painter Pichot, [...] was rather a wonderful creature, he was long and thin like one of those primitive Christs in Spanish churches and when he did a Spanish dance which he did later at the famous banquet to Rousseau, he was awe-inspiringly religious.

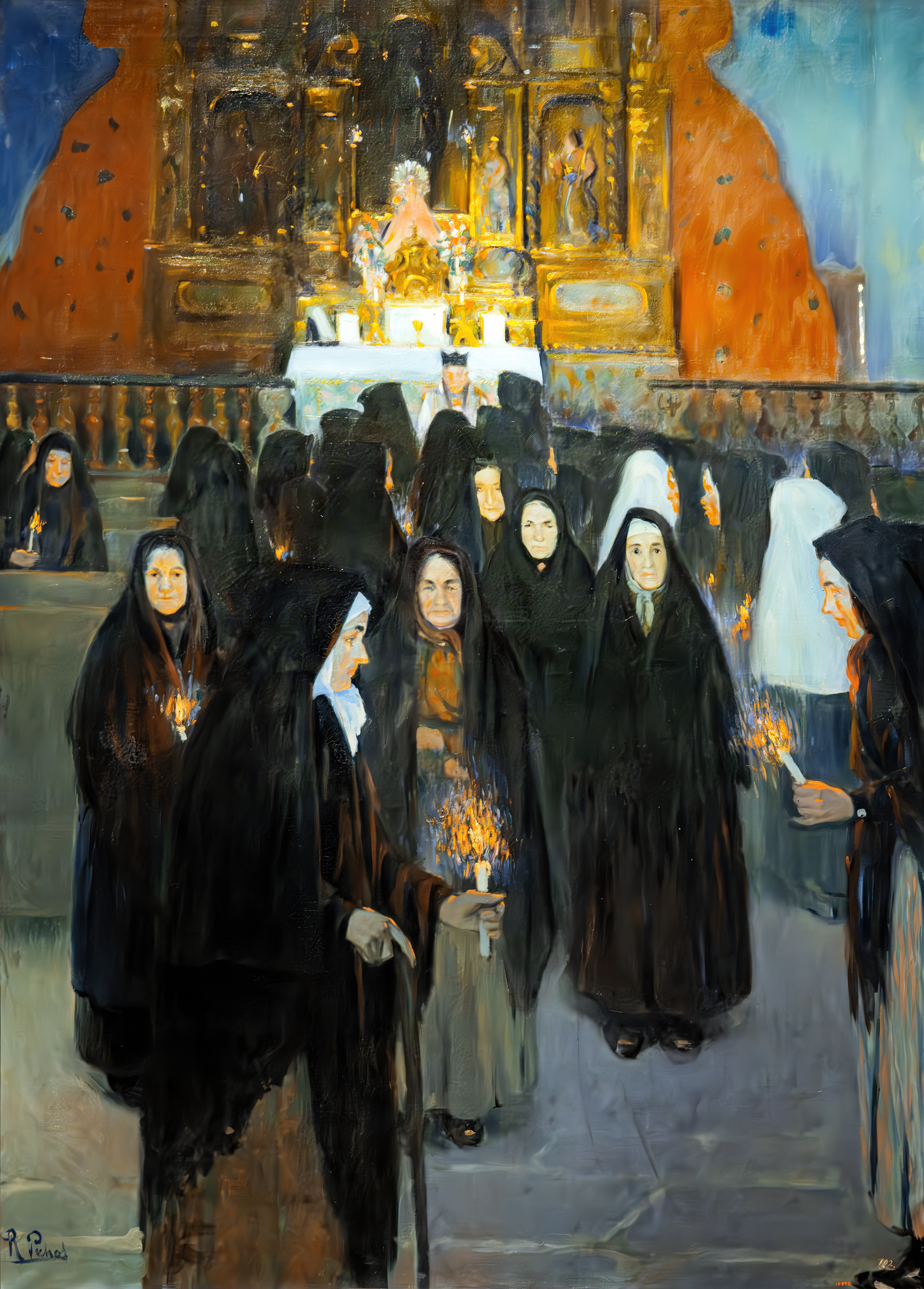
Ofrena MNAC

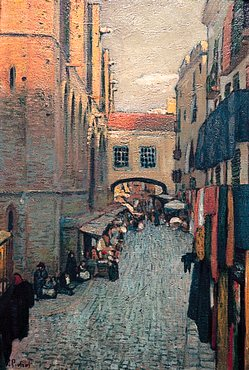
Carrer de Santa Maria
