= Eliseu Meifrèn =

Spanish painter

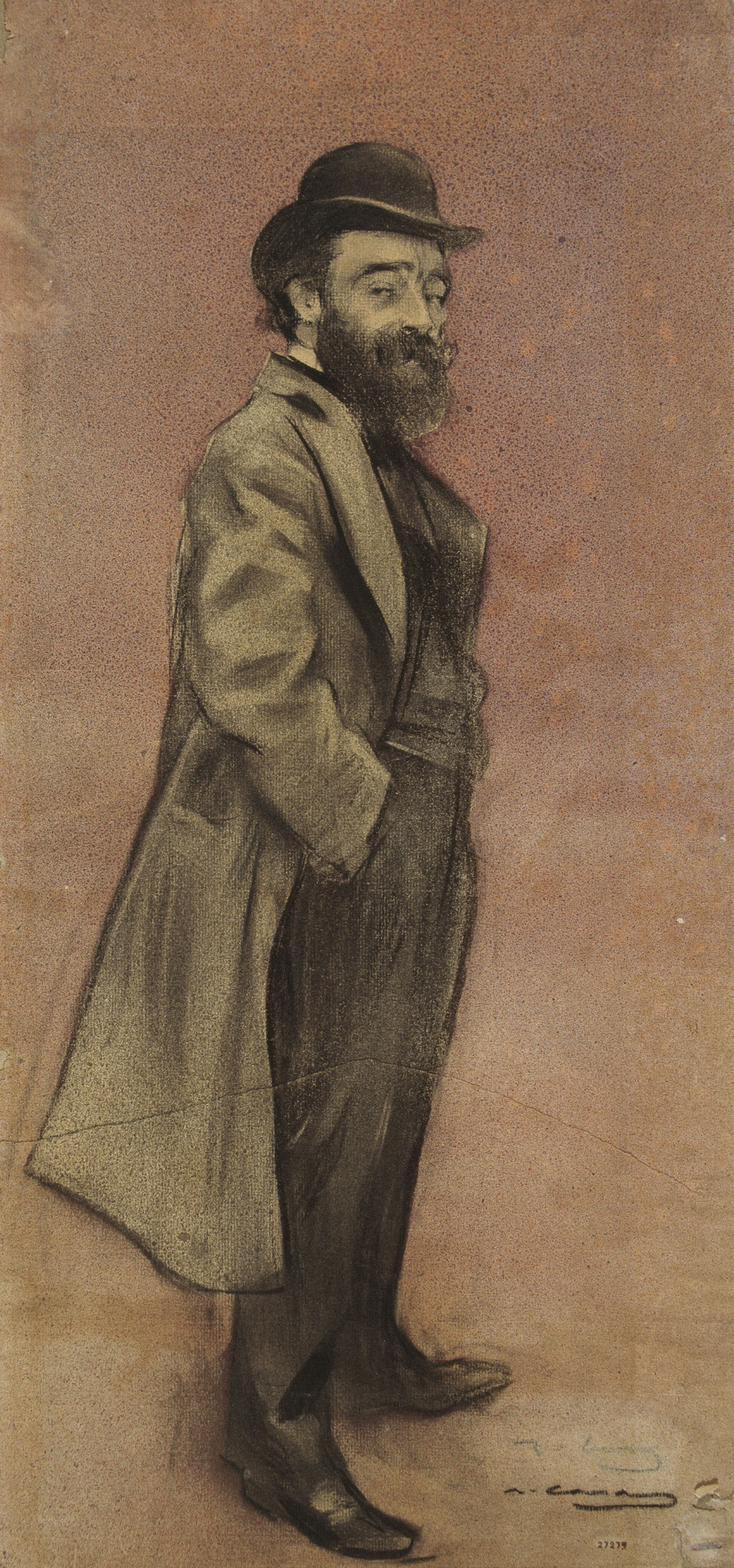
Eliseo Meifrèn; drawing by Ramon Casas (date unknown)

Eliseo Meifrèn i Roig (Note: Wrongfully attributed as Eliseu, which is the Portuguese variant of Eliseo. Eliseo Meifrèn is Spanish. Likewise, several auctions of Meifrèn's work accredit him as Eliseo.)(24 December 1857/59, Barcelona – 5 February 1940, Barcelona) was a Spanish Impressionist painter.

== Biography ==
Following his passion for art, he gave up the study of medicine and enrolled at the Escola de la Llotja, where his teachers were Antoni Caba and Ramon Martí Alsina. In 1879, he went to Paris and supported his studies by selling small canvases and sketches of cityscapes. His style was, however, decisively influenced by a brief tour of Italy. Upon his return to Spain in 1881, he participated in the National Exhibition of Fine Arts.

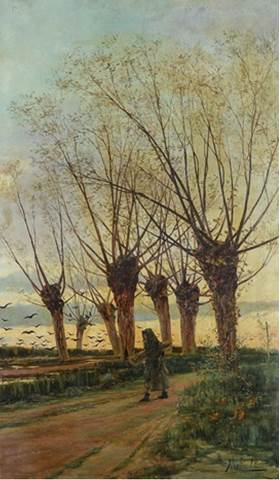
Peasant on a Path (1882)

The following year, he married, honeymooned in Paris, and settled there. His first personal exhibition came in 1890 at the Sala Parés in Barcelona, where he presented seventy oils and surprised everyone by auctioning off the works that did not sell, with his friend Santiago Rusiñol acting as the appraiser. He used the proceeds to return to Italy.

In 1892, he went back to Paris and began to associate with the Impressionists, producing changes in his use of colors. Five years later, he accepted an invitation from the President of the "Gabinete Literario", and moved to Las Palmas in the Canary Islands. His home there became a makeshift art academy, where Néstor Martín-Fernández de la Torre was one of his students.

=== More travels ===
His fame peaked at the turn of the century, with exhibitions in South America as well as Europe. However, after the commercial failure of his works at the "Real Círculo Artístico de Barcelona", he decided to move to Buenos Aires. He arrived there in 1903, held his first exhibition shortly after and organized a large exposition of Catalan painters in 1904, including five pastels by Pablo Picasso. In 1905, he was offered the position of Director at the "Escola de d´Arts i Oficis de Palma" on Mallorca, accepted, and moved again.

He continued to travel however, to France, Italy, Buenos Aires and Brussels, where he participated in the International Exposition, winning the Silver Medal. In 1915, he travelled to the United States to promote himself at the Panama–Pacific International Exposition, receiving honorable mention, and won the Grand Prize at an exhibition in San Diego. He then settled briefly in New York, where he displayed his paintings of Mallorca and Cadaqués, a village where he had spent his summers since 1886.

Finally, in 1917, he returned to Barcelona to stay. His wife died in 1924 and he remarried in 1930. When the Spanish Civil War began, he and his family fled to Manresa, where they lived as refugees until 1939. In December of that year, his final exhibition was held in Barcelona at the Sala Gaspar. It was a critical and financial success, but he was too ill to attend. A few weeks later, his health worsened rapidly and he died in February, in his home city of Barcelona.

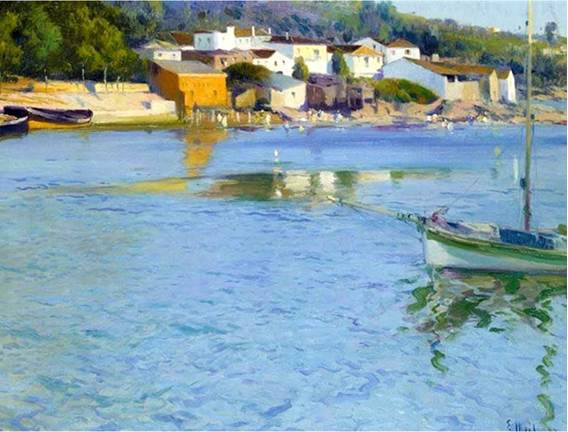
View of Pontevedra (1908)
