= Roca (surname) =

Roca is a Spanish surname. Notable people with the surname include:

- Alain Roca (born 1976), Cuban volleyball player
- Blas Roca (1908–1987), Cuban politician
- Joan Roca i Caball (1898-1976), Catalan politician
- Joan Roca i Fontané (b. 1964), Catalan gourmet chef
- Jordi Roca i Fontané (b. 1978), Catalan gourmet chef
- Josep Roca i Fontané (b. 1966), Catalan sommelier
- Julio Argentino Roca (1843–1914), President of Argentina from 1980 to 1986 and 1898 to 1904
- Julio Argentino Pascual Roca (1873–1942), Vice President of Argentina from 1932 to 1938, and son of President Roca
- Ulysease Roca (d. 2020), Belizean crime victim
- Vladimiro Roca (1942–2023), Cuban dissident

== See also ==
- Roca (disambiguation)
