= Roca =

Roca or ROCA may refer to:

== Places ==
- Roca (archaeological site), an archaeological site in Salento, Italy
- Roca, Nebraska, a village in Nebraska, USA
- Cabo da Roca

== People ==
- Roca (surname)
- (RoCa) Gloria Rodriguez Calero (b. 1959) Nuyorican artist

== Businesses and organizations ==
- Roca (company), a Spanish multinational producer of sanitary products
- Republic of China Army
- Rockland Center for the Arts, West Nyack, NY
- Royal Observer Corps Association, an association of former ROC members in the UK
- Russian Orthodox Church Abroad

== Other uses ==
- Almond Roca, brand of toffee made by Brown and Haley
- Roca Formation (disambiguation), geologic units of that name
- Radio Orienteering in a Compact Area
- Risk of Ovarian Cancer Algorithm, an unproven ovarian cancer screening test
- Roca Skolia, a fictional character from Catherine Asaro's Saga of the Skolian Empire
- ROCA vulnerability, a cryptographic vulnerability
- ROCA (Web programming), a web development architectural style for front-end applications.

== See also ==
- De la Roca (disambiguation)
- Rocca (disambiguation)
