= El Celler de Can Roca =

Restaurant in Spain

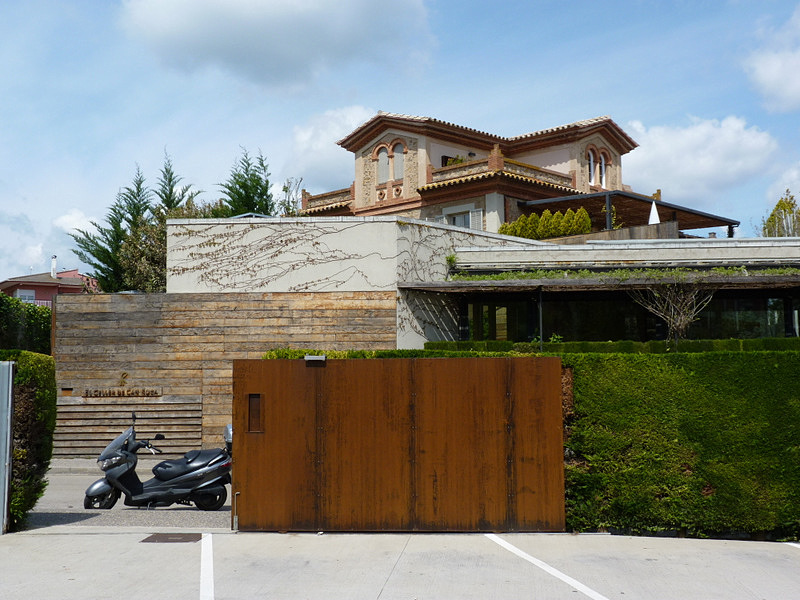
- The exterior of El Celler de Can Roca

- The location of the restaurant in Spain

Restaurant information
- Established: 1986
- Head chef: Joan Roca
- Food type: Catalan
- Rating: (Michelin Guide)
- Location: Can Sunyer, 48, Girona, 17007, Spain
- Coordinates: 41.993289°N 2.807959°E
- Seating capacity: 45 people
- Reservations: Essential
- Website: cellercanroca.com/home/en/

El Celler de Can Roca is a restaurant in Girona, Catalonia, Spain opened in 1986 by the Roca brothers, Joan, Josep and Jordi. It was first located next to their parents' restaurant Can Roca, but moved to its current purpose-built building in 2007. It has been received warmly by critics, and holds three Michelin stars. El Celler de Can Roca was ranked the best restaurant in the world by the magazine Restaurant in 2013 and 2015, and was ranked second in 2011, 2012, 2014, and 2018.

== Style and cuisine ==
The cuisine served by the restaurant is traditional Catalan, but with twists which the Michelin Guide describes as "creative". The restaurant has a wine cellar of 60,000 bottles. Dishes served include those based on perfumes, and with unusual presentations such as caramelised olives served on a bonsai tree.

== Description ==
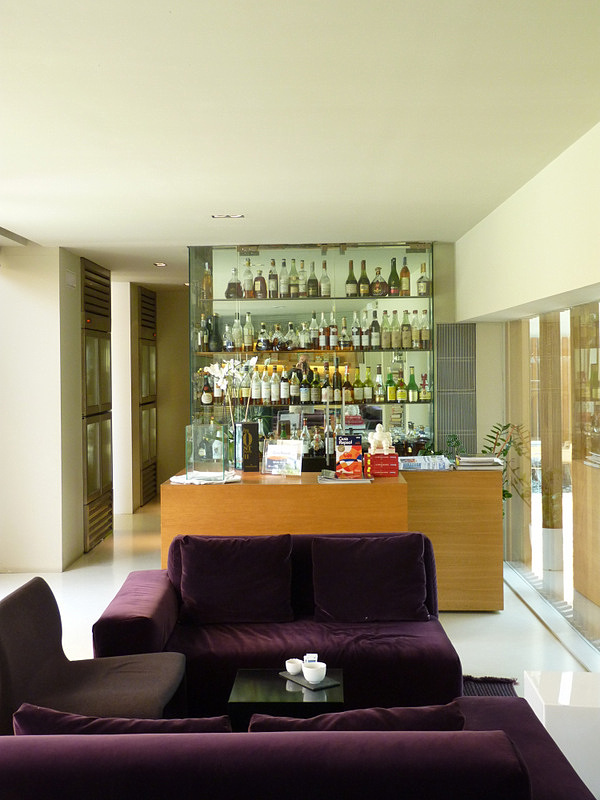
The bar area of the restaurant in the present location

El Celler de Can Roca was founded in 1986 by the Roca brothers next to their family's main restaurant Can Roca which had been open on the site since 1967. The oldest brother, Joan Roca is the head chef; Josep Roca, the middle brother, is the sommelier, and the youngest brother, Jordi Roca, is in charge of desserts. Because of their work at the restaurant, the brothers have appeared at Harvard University in the United States as part of the Science and Cooking program.

== Modernism ==
In late 2007, the restaurant moved to a modern building custom-built for the restaurant about 100 meters from the prior location, with the original location still being used for staff meals. The new layout features wooden floors, with simply dressed tables. On each table sit three stones to signify the three Roca brothers, while the tableware is Rosenthal china. The enlarged kitchen in the new location includes space for thirty chefs to work and also features Joan Roca's open plan office, so that he can keep an eye on the chefs even while he is doing more administrative tasks. At least one of the three brothers is present for every service. There is a capacity for 45 diners.

== Media ==
El Celler de Can Roca appeared on the UK television series MasterChef: The Professionals on 13 December 2011. The three finalists in the competition were asked to cook their own creations for the three Roca brothers, as well as cooking six of the restaurant's signature dishes for a group of invited guests. Mark Birchall, the 2009 winner of the Roux Scholarship elected to work at El Celler de Can Roca as part of his prize. Birchall was head chef of L'Enclume in Cartmel, England, under chef-patron Simon Rogan. This resulted in the restaurant appearing on the featured chef series of British chef networking website "The Staff Canteen".

=== Menu ===
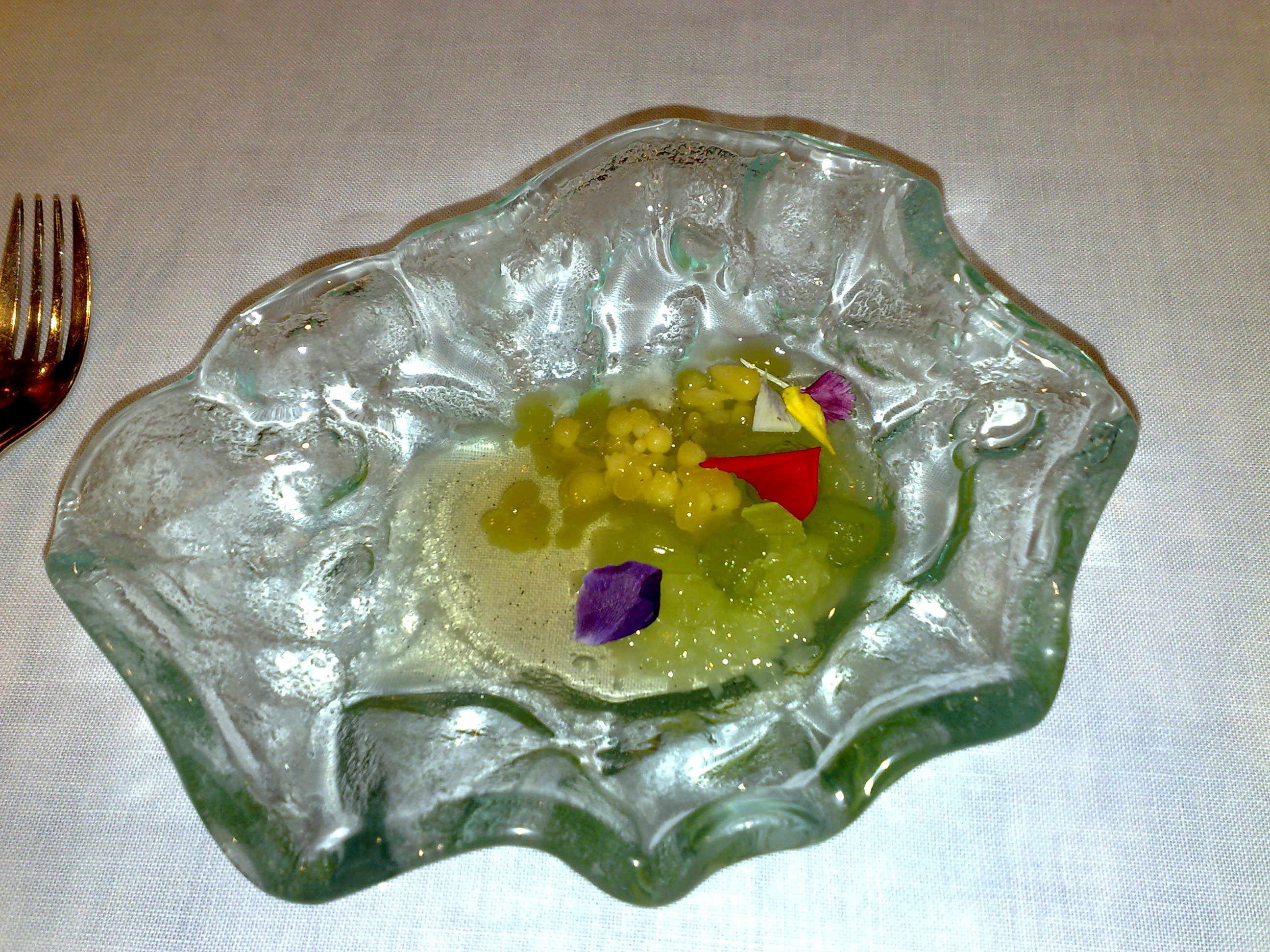
An adaptation of the perfume DKNY

The restaurant primarily uses local ingredients from the Catalan area. Simple flavour combinations are combined with molecular gastronomy techniques and unusual presentations of food, including caramelised olives which are presented on a bonsai tree. The Michelin Guide describes the type of cuisine produced by El Celler de Can Roca simply as "creative", while Edward Owen of The Times said it was a "fusion of traditional dishes with surrealist touches". Techniques include the freezing of calamari with liquid nitrogen and then blended in order to be piped and baked into a cracker.

When diners first arrive, they are given a selection of small bites from a section of the kitchen called "El Món", who only produce small snack portions for the guests. They typically demonstrate flavours from around the world and come in sets of five. These introduce the diner to the unusual techniques and presentations of the restaurants. For example, a small ball of frozen spiced fish stock coated in cocoa butter represents Thailand, while the set comes on a purpose-built wooden holder. While there are typical fine dining ingredients included on the menu such as lobster and foie gras, due to the Catalan influence on the menu, ingredients such as pigeon, hake and pig's trotters also appear. Fish dishes include a crayfish velouté, accompanied by spring onions with cocoa and mint.

They have created some dishes and desserts based on perfumes such as Calvin Klein's Eternity, Carolina Herrera, Lancôme and Bulgari. This has resulted in a perfume being released by the restaurant itself, called Nuvol de Ilimona. It was based on a dessert served at the restaurant called Lemon Distillation, and was developed to spray as a mist over the diners as they ate the dish.

== Reception ==
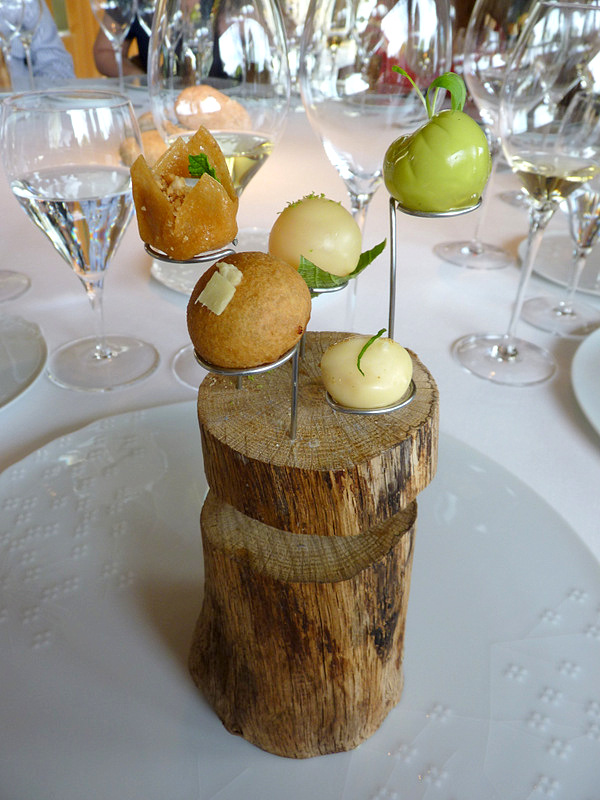
The selection of small bites from "El Món"

El Celler de Can Roca has been praised by fellow chefs, with Michel Roux describing it as "one of the top restaurants in Europe", and Michel Roux Jr. stating that it was his favourite restaurant. Nicholas Lander reviewed the restaurant for the Financial Times in 2008 and also praised the veal tartare, but was impressed by the main of kid goat, and the dessert of sheep's milk ice cream.

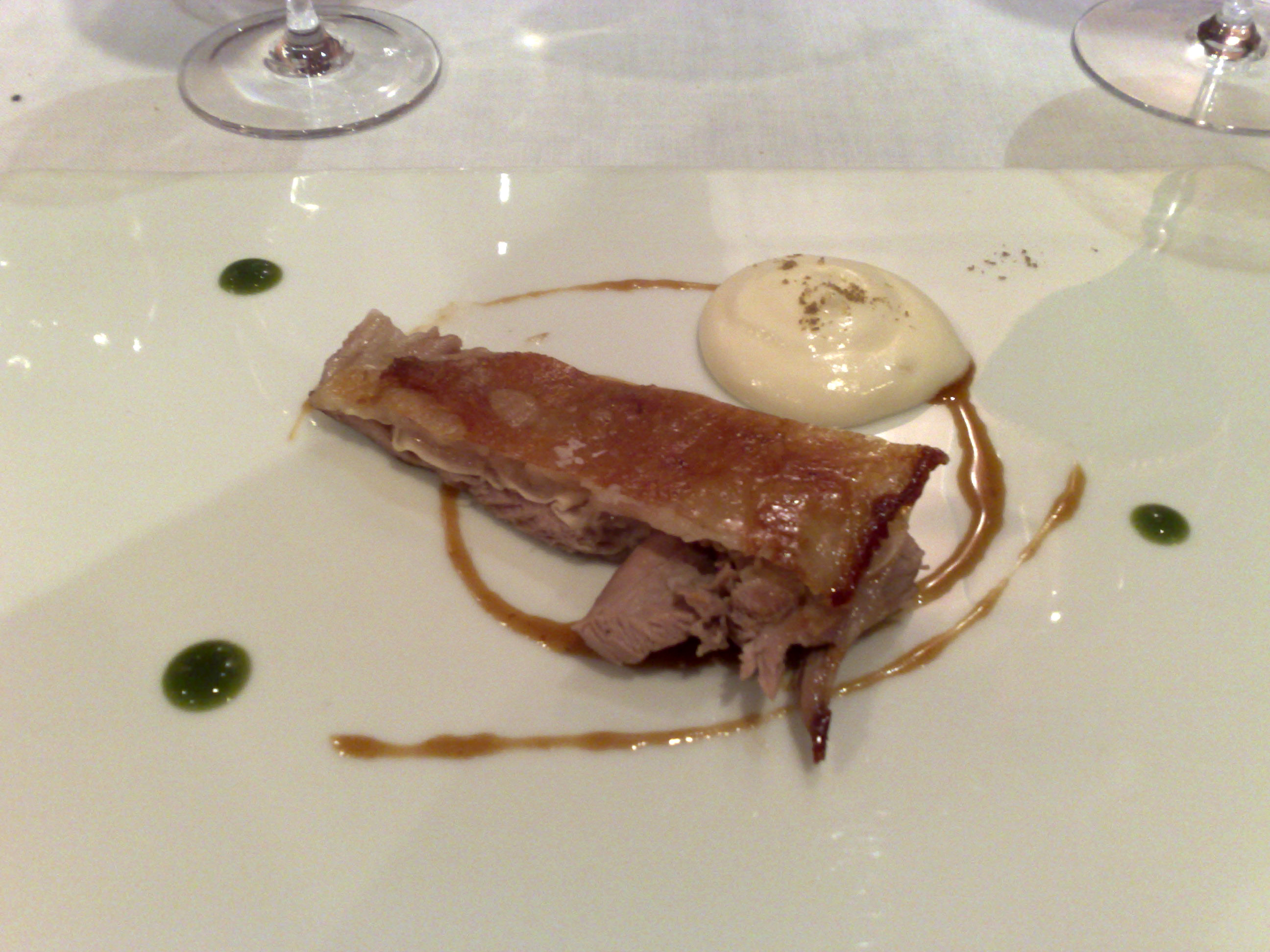
A slice of kid goat, served with goat's milk and mint

Jonathan Gold of The Wall Street Journal wrote of the presentation of the caramelised olives, describing it as "delectable and unforgettable". In September 2011, it was included in a list of the top ten places to eat by Tony Turnbull, The Times food editor. Critic A. A. Gill compared the restaurant to former restaurant El Bulli, saying that it wasn't a direct replacement and was an "outstanding kitchen, and part of the great confident wave of new Spanish food that is complex, technically exhausting, aware of the landscape, history and politics". The comparison is commonly made, with El Celler de Can Roca often being referred to as the successor to El Bulli which was once ranked as the number one restaurant in the world.

The restaurant was awarded its first Michelin star in 1995, its second in 2002 and was awarded three star status in 2009. It remains at that level of accolade as of the 2019 Michelin Guide. El Celler de Can Roca has been listed in The World's 50 Best Restaurants by Restaurant magazine since 2006 when it was ranked 21st. In 2009 it was ranked fifth and was awarded the prize for being the highest climbing restaurant on the list. In 2010, it rose one place to fourth and in 2011, 2012 and 2014, it was ranked in second place behind Danish New Nordic cuisine restaurant Noma, with fellow Spanish restaurant Mugaritz in third place. On 29 April 2013, and again on 1 June 2015, the restaurant was named the best in the world. The restaurant has maintained a top 3 spot since, 2nd in 2016 and 2018, 3rd in 2017. In The Daily Meal's inaugural list of the best 101 restaurants in Europe in 2012, El Celler de Can Roca was ranked twelfth. During the same year, it was named as restaurant of the year by The Sunday Telegraph.
