= Rocha =

Rocha may refer to:

- Rocha (surname), a Portuguese surname
- Rocha, Moca, Puerto Rico, a barrio in the municipality of Moca, Puerto Rico
- Rocha, Rio de Janeiro, a neighborhood in Rio de Janeiro, Brazil
- Rocha, Uruguay, capital city of the Rocha Department
- Rocha Department, a department in the east of Uruguay

== See also ==
- A Rocha, an international conservation organization with a Christian ethos
- Pêra Rocha, a Portuguese variety of pear
- Rocca (disambiguation)
