= De la Roca =

De la Roca is a surname. Notable people with the surname include:

- Antonio de la Roca, an Anglo-French Antarctic explorer
- Joaquín Martínez de la Roca, a Spanish people composer
- Zack de la Rocha, an American rapper and singer
- Luis Carlos de la Roca, alias Party LC

== See also ==
- Castellfollit de la Roca, a region of Spain
- La Roca de la Sierra, a region of Spain
- Castillo de San Pedro de la Roca, a Cuban fortress
- Della Rocca (disambiguation)
- Roca (disambiguation)
