= Rocca =

Rocca may refer to:

- Rocca (surname)
- Rocca (fortification), a fortifiable stronghold
- Rocca (crater), a lunar crater
- Rocca (French rapper) (born 1975), French–Colombian rapper
- Rocca tower, part of the headquarters of the Court of Justice of the European Union, and tallest building in Luxembourg.

== Places ==
Municipalities (comuni) of Italy

- Rocca Canavese, in the province of Turin
- Rocca Canterano, in the province of Rome
- Rocca Cigliè, in the province of Cuneo
- Rocca d'Arazzo, in the province of Asti
- Rocca d'Arce, in the province of Frosinone
- Rocca de' Baldi, in the province of Cuneo
- Rocca de' Giorgi, in the province of Pavia
- Rocca d'Evandro, in the province of Caserta
- Rocca di Botte, in the province of L'Aquila
- Rocca di Cambio, in the province of L'Aquila
- Rocca di Cave, in the province of Rome
- Rocca di Mezzo, in the province of L'Aquila
- Rocca di Neto, in the province of Crotone
- Rocca di Papa, in the province of Rome
- Rocca Grimalda, in the province of Alessandria
- Rocca Imperiale, in the province of Cosenza
- Rocca Massima, in the province of Latina
- Rocca Pia, in the province of L'Aquila
- Rocca Pietore, in the province of Belluno
- Rocca Priora, in the province of Rome
- Rocca San Casciano, in the province of Forlì-Cesena
- Rocca San Felice, in the province of Avellino
- Rocca San Giovanni, in the province of Chieti
- Rocca Santa Maria, in the province of Teramo
- Rocca Santo Stefano, in the province of Rome
- Rocca Sinibalda, in the province of Rieti
- Rocca Susella, in the province of Pavia
- Roccabascerana, in the province of Avellino
- Roccabernarda, in the province of Crotone
- Roccabianca, in the province of Parma
- Roccabruna, in the province of Cuneo
- Roccacasale, in the province of L'Aquila
- Roccadaspide, in the province of Salerno
- Roccafiorita, in the province of Messina
- Roccafluvione, in the province of Ascoli Piceno
- Roccaforte del Greco, in the province of Reggio Calabria
- Roccaforte Ligure, in the province of Alessandria
- Roccaforte Mondovì, in the province of Cuneo
- Roccaforzata, in the province of Taranto
- Roccafranca, in the province of Brescia
- Roccagiovine, in the province of Rome
- Roccagloriosa, in the province of Salerno
- Roccagorga, in the province of Latina
- Roccalbegna, in the province of Grosseto
- Roccalumera, in the province of Messina
- Roccamandolfi, in the province of Isernia
- Roccamena, in the province of Palermo
- Roccamonfina, in the province of Caserta
- Roccamontepiano, in the province of Chieti
- Roccamorice, in the province of Pescara
- Roccanova, in the province of Potenza
- Roccantica, in the province of Rieti
- Roccapalumba, in the province of Palermo
- Roccapiemonte, in the province of Salerno
- Roccarainola, in the province of Naples
- Roccaraso, in the province of L'Aquila
- Roccaromana, in the province of Caserta
- Roccascalegna, in the province of Chieti
- Roccasecca, in the province of Frosinone
- Roccasecca dei Volsci, in the province of Latina
- Roccasicura, in the province of Isernia
- Roccasparvera, in the province of Cuneo
- Roccaspinalveti, in the province of Chieti
- Roccastrada, in the province of Grosseto
- Roccavaldina, in the province of Messina
- Roccaverano, in the province of Asti
- Roccavignale, in the province of Savona
- Roccavione, in the province of Cuneo
- Roccavivara, in the province of Campobasso

Civil parishes (frazioni) of Italy

- Rocca Cilento, in the municipality of Lustra (SA)
- Rocca di Fondi, in the municipality of Antrodoco (RI)
- Roccacannuccia, in the municipality of Nardò (LE)
- Roccapassa, in the municipality of Amatrice (RI)
- Roccapietra, in the municipality of Varallo Sesia (VC)
- Roccapipirozzi, in the municipality of Sesto Campano (IS)
- Roccaporena, in the municipality of Cascia (PG)
- Roccatederighi, in the municipality of Roccastrada (GR)
- Rocca di Manerba del Garda, in the municipality of Manerba del Garda (BS)

== See also ==
- Roca (disambiguation)
- Roccaforte (disambiguation)
- Rocchetta (disambiguation)
- Della Rocca (disambiguation)
