= Bartolome de Osuna =

Spanish colonial governor

Bartolomé de Osuna was the Spanish colonial governor of Santiago de Cuba from 1643 to 1648.

In 1643, Bartolomé de Osuna took over the Spanish governorship of Santiago de Cuba from Pedro de la Roca de Borja. Later in the same year, he fought and won a duel against Diego de Egües y Beaumont, injuring him gravely. He was succeeded as the city's governor by Felipe de Rivera in 1648.
