= Joan Roca i Fontané =

Spanish chef

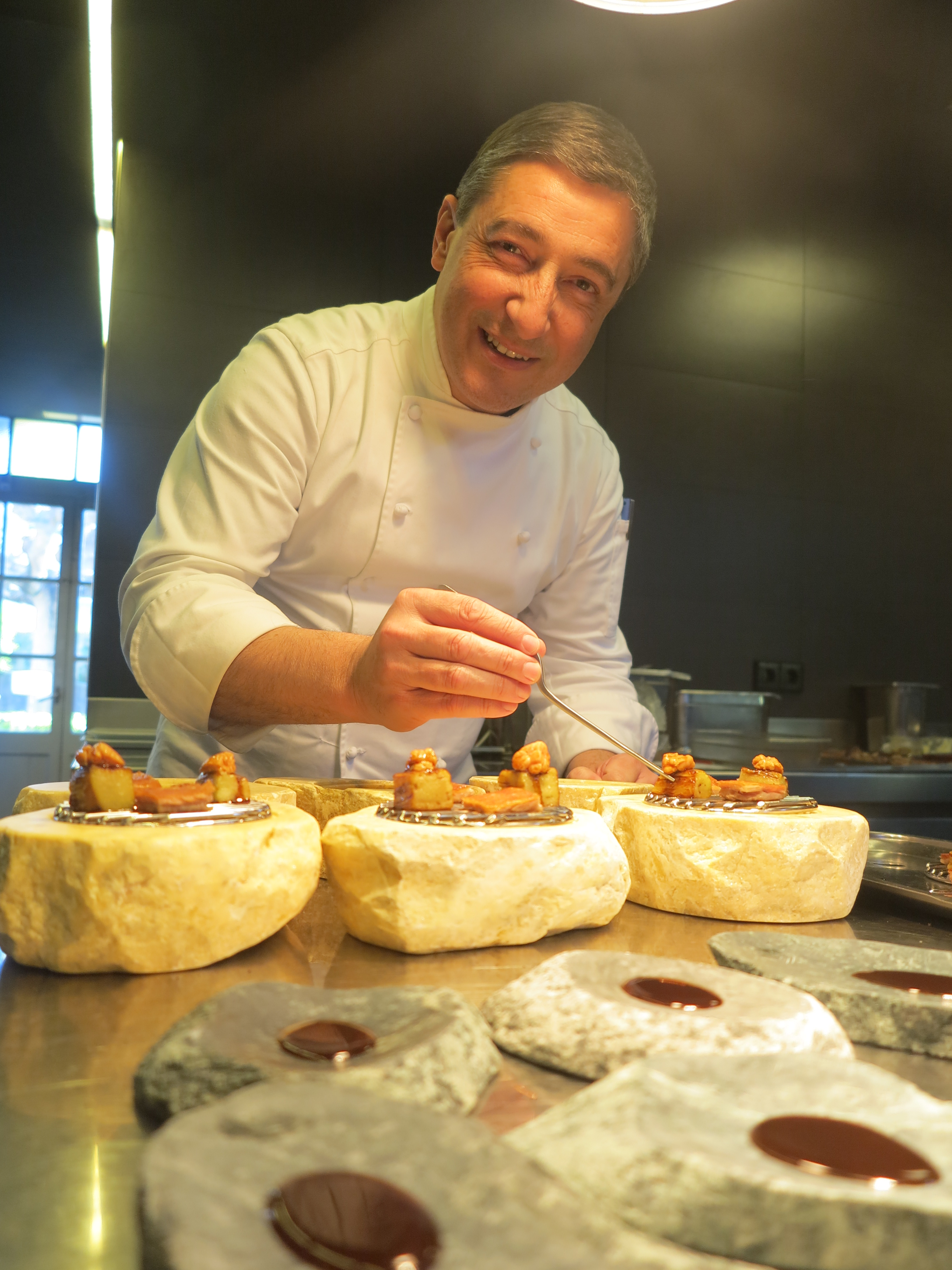
- Joan Roca in the kitchen of El Celler de Can Roca
- Born: 11 February 1964 (age 62); Girona, Spain
- Culinary career
- Cooking style: Catalan; haute cuisine

Joan Roca i Fontané (born 11 February 1964) is a Spanish chef and the founder of El Celler de Can Roca, which was awarded three Michelin stars in 2009. In 2013 & 2015, it was named the best restaurant in the world by the Restaurant Magazine. It was ranked second by the same magazine in 2011, 2012 & 2014.

He studied in Escola d'Hosteleria de Girona, where later he became a teacher. He worked with his grandparents and parents in their family business, a restaurant of traditional Catalan cuisine. Today Joan is the chef of his own restaurant, together with his two brothers, Josep (sommelier), and Jordi (pastry chef). Roca combines traditional Catalan recipes with avant-garde techniques, such as sous-vide and distillation.

== Acknowledgments ==
Roca's restaurant, El Celler de Can Roca, received its second Michelin star in 2002 and its third in 2009. Under his leadership, Restaurant magazine named the establishment the best restaurant in the world in 2013 and 2015. Roca has received individual recognition as the Spanish Academy of Gastronomy's Cook of the Year (2000) and the International Academy of Gastronomy's Grand Prix de l'Art de la Cuisine (2011). He was also voted the winner of the Chefs' Choice Award in 2016 and named "The Best Chef" by The Best Chef Awards in 2017 and 2018.

== Publications ==
- El Celler de Can Roca, by Joan, Josep and Jordi Roca. In Catalan, Spanish and English.
- La cocina al vacío (Sous-Vide Cuisine), by Joan Roca and Salvador Brugués. Translated to English, French, German and Italian.
- Les receptes catalanes de tota la vida (Lifelong catalan recipes), by Joan Roca and his mother, Montserrat Fontané.
- La cuina de la meva mare (The cooking of my mother), by Joan Roca. In Catalan and Spanish.
- Deu menus per a un concert (Ten menus for a concert), by Joan Roca. In Catalan and Spanish.

== See also ==
- Haute cuisine
