= Diego de Egües y Beaumont =

Spanish soldier, nobleman and colonial governor

Cross of the Order of Santiago.

Arms of the House of Beaumont.

Diego de Egüés y Belmont (Sevilla, Andalusia, Spain c. 1612 – Bogotá, December 25, 1664) was a Spanish soldier, noble and colonial governor. He is famous for his command of Spanish forces in the naval action of the Battle of Santa Cruz de Tenerife.

He was the eldest son of Martín de Egüés, judge of the Casa de Contratación de Indias and later the Royal Chancery of Valladolid, and Juana Verdugo de la Cueva (or Anne).

== Early life and career ==
His family being politically connected, in his childhood he was a page of Philip III of Spain. He accompanied his father to the Viceroyalty of Peru when he was appointed president of the Royal Audience of Charcas. After the death of his father, he was appointed Mayor of Oropeza and the valley of Cochabamba. Once his term of office expired, Egües served as an infantry captain and saw his first action against the United Provinces of the Netherlands in the defense of the port at El Callao.

In 1643 he began his journey back to Spain, which was interrupted by serious injuries received by Egües in a duel fought in the Captaincy General of Cuba against the governor of Santiago de Cuba, Bartolome de Osuna. Egües won this battle.

He was later a captain in the Carrera de Indias, General Fleet Admiral of the Fleet of New Spain, governor of the Spanish Armada, and Chief of the Council and Treasury Accounting. He was also a Knight of the Order of Santiago.

He suffered a heavy defeat at the hands of Admiral Robert Blake at the Battle of Santa Cruz de Tenerife in April 1657 but did land the crucial treasure ashore even though it would not leave for nearly a year.

In 1661 he became president of the Real Audiencia de Santafé de Bogotá, taking office in February of the following year. While in office, he encouraged the creation of Catholic missions among the indigenous Paeces Indians and the tribes of the plains in the province of Pamplona in present-day Colombia. In 1663, Charguaje and Tama Indians attacked Mocoa and "shattered all the crosses that they found". In Santafé, with the help of the syndic Francisco de Caldas Barboza, he opened the first public slaughterhouse, finished the building of the tower and the porch at the Catedral Primada de Colombia and built bridges over the rivers San Agustín, San Francisco and Funza.

== Death ==
He died in December 1664 while in office after several days of illness. During the 18 months following, the government was run by the High Court, presided by head judge, Francisco de Leyva.

== Family connections ==
His great-nephew was Martín de Ursúa y Arizmendi, who was responsible for the final conquest of the last independent Maya kingdom.
