= Della Rocca =

Della Rocca is the name of

- Bartolomeo della Rocca (1467–1504), Italian scholar
- Enrico Morozzo Della Rocca (1807–1897), Italian general
- Francesco Della Rocca (born 1987), Italian footballer
- Giacomo della Rocca (1592–1605), Italian painter
- Jason Della Rocca (born 1974), American software developer
- Luigi Della Rocca (born 1982), Italian footballer

== See also ==
- David Della Rocco (born 1952), actor
- Rocca (disambiguation)
- De la Roca (disambiguation)
