= Pedro de la Roca de Borja =

Pedro de la Roca de Borja or Pedro de la Roca y Borja was a Spanish noble and the colonial governor of Santiago de Cuba from 1637 to 1640 or 1643. He was a member of the prestigious House of Borja family.

In 1637, Pedro de la Roca de Borja took over the Spanish governorship of Santiago de Cuba from Juan de Amezqueta Quijano. He was succeeded as the city's governor by Bartolomé de Osuna in December 1643.

== Legacy ==
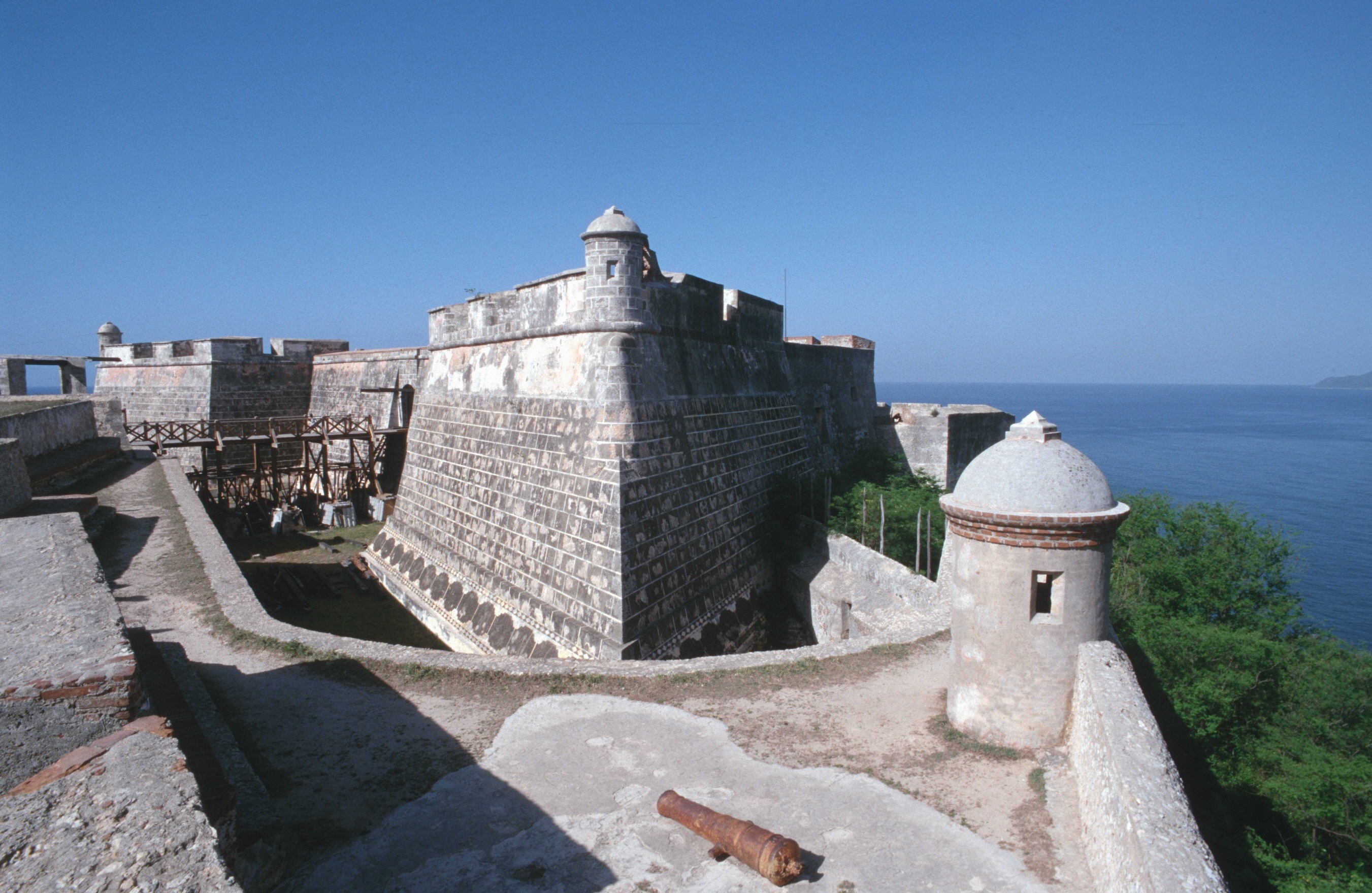
view of the castle

The Castillo de San Pedro de la Roca overlooking the entry to the Bay of Santiago and serving as a defense against raiding pirates and colonial competitors was named in his honor.
