= Roccaforte =

Roccaforte may refer to several Italian municipalities:

- Roccaforte del Greco, in the province of Reggio Calabria
- Roccaforte Ligure, in the province of Alessandria
- Roccaforte Mondovì, in the province of Cuneo
