= Roca Formation =

Roca Formation may refer to:

- Roca Formation, Argentina, Paleocene geologic formation of Argentina
- Roca Formation (United States), Permian geologic formation of central United States
- Roca Blanca Formation, Jurassic geologic formation of Argentina
