= Castillo de San Pedro de la Roca =

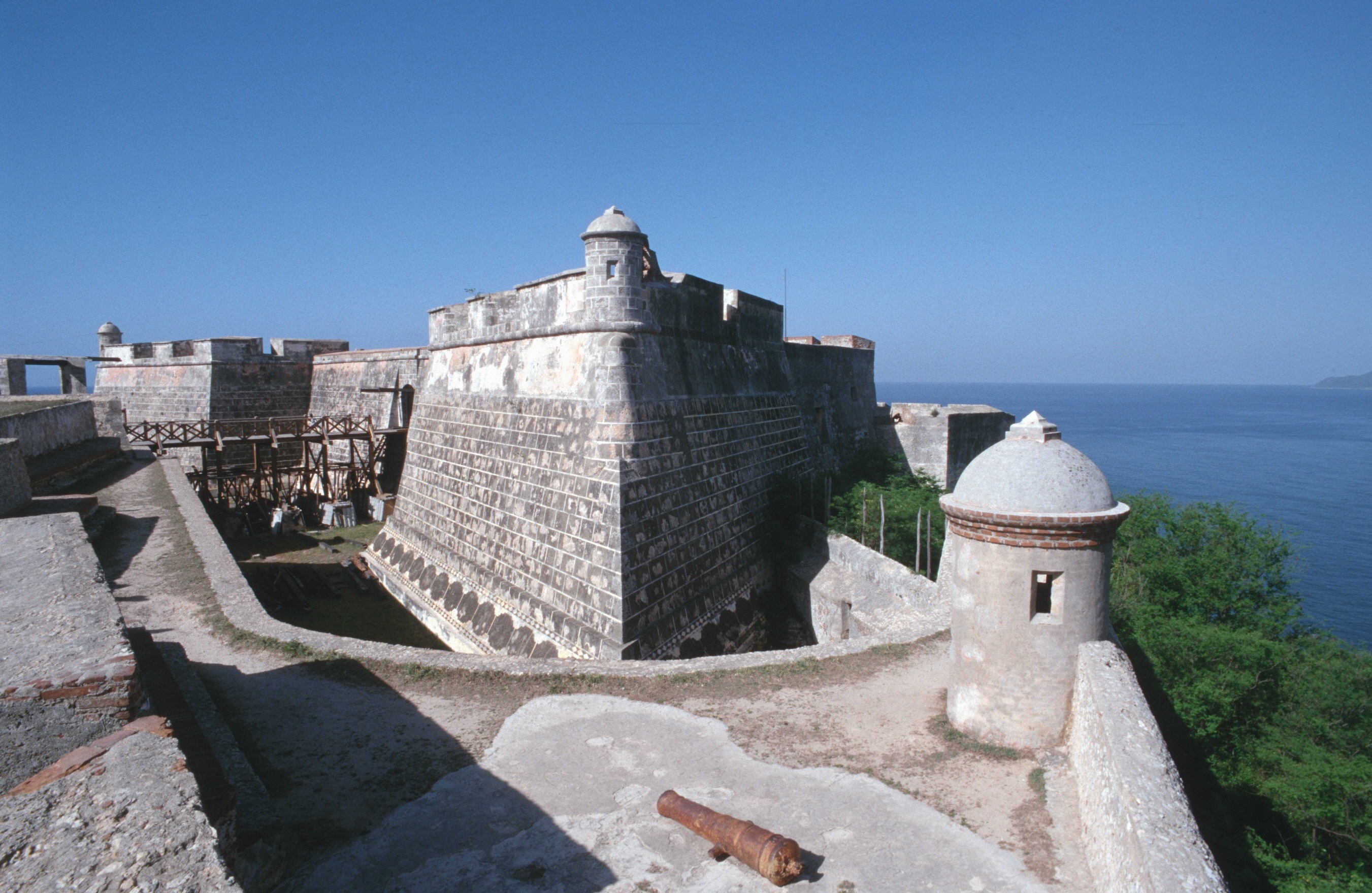
- Castillo de San Pedro de la Roca
- Interactive map of Castillo de San Pedro de la Roca
- Location: Santiago de Cuba, Cuba
- Coordinates: 19°58′7.34″N 75°52′13.08″W
- Built: 1638
- Architect: Giovanni Battista Antonelli

UNESCO World Heritage Site
- Official name: San Pedro de la Roca Castle, Santiago de Cuba
- Type: Cultural
- Criteria: iv, v
- Designated: 1997 (21st session)
- Reference no.: 841
- Region: Latin America and the Caribbean

The Castillo de San Pedro de la Roca (also known by the less formal title of Castillo del Morro or as San Pedro de la Roca Castle) is a fortress located on the coast of the Cuban city of Santiago de Cuba. About 6 miles (10 km) southwest of the city centre, it overlooks the bay. The fortress was declared a World Heritage Site by UNESCO in 1997, cited as the best preserved and most complete example of Spanish-American military architecture.

== History ==
=== Initial design ===
A ravelin and battery were constructed at the site between 1590 and 1610, to protect the town of Santiago de Cuba. A larger fort was designed in the early 1600s by Battista Antonelli (also known as Juan Battista Antonelli), a member of a Milanese family of military engineers, on behalf of the governor of the city, Pedro de la Roca de Borja, as a defense against raiding pirates. Antonelli's design was adapted to the location of the fortress on the steep sides of the promontory (the morro from which the fortress gets its name) reaching into the bay. It was constructed on a series of terraces; there were four main levels and three large bulwarks to house the artillery. Supplies would be delivered by sea and then stored in the large warehouse, which was cut directly into the rock, or transported up to the top level which housed the citadel. Construction of the citadel took 62 years, starting in 1638 and finally being completed in 1700, though work on the fortification was spasmodic. Antonelli was recalled to Cuba in 1598, shortly after the massive project was started, and other examples of his work can be seen there in the twin forts of Fuerte del Cojimar and Torreón de la Chorrera (Fuerte de Santa Doratea de Luna de Chorrera). Some of the structures from the earlier fortification were later incorporated into the main structure.

=== Further construction ===
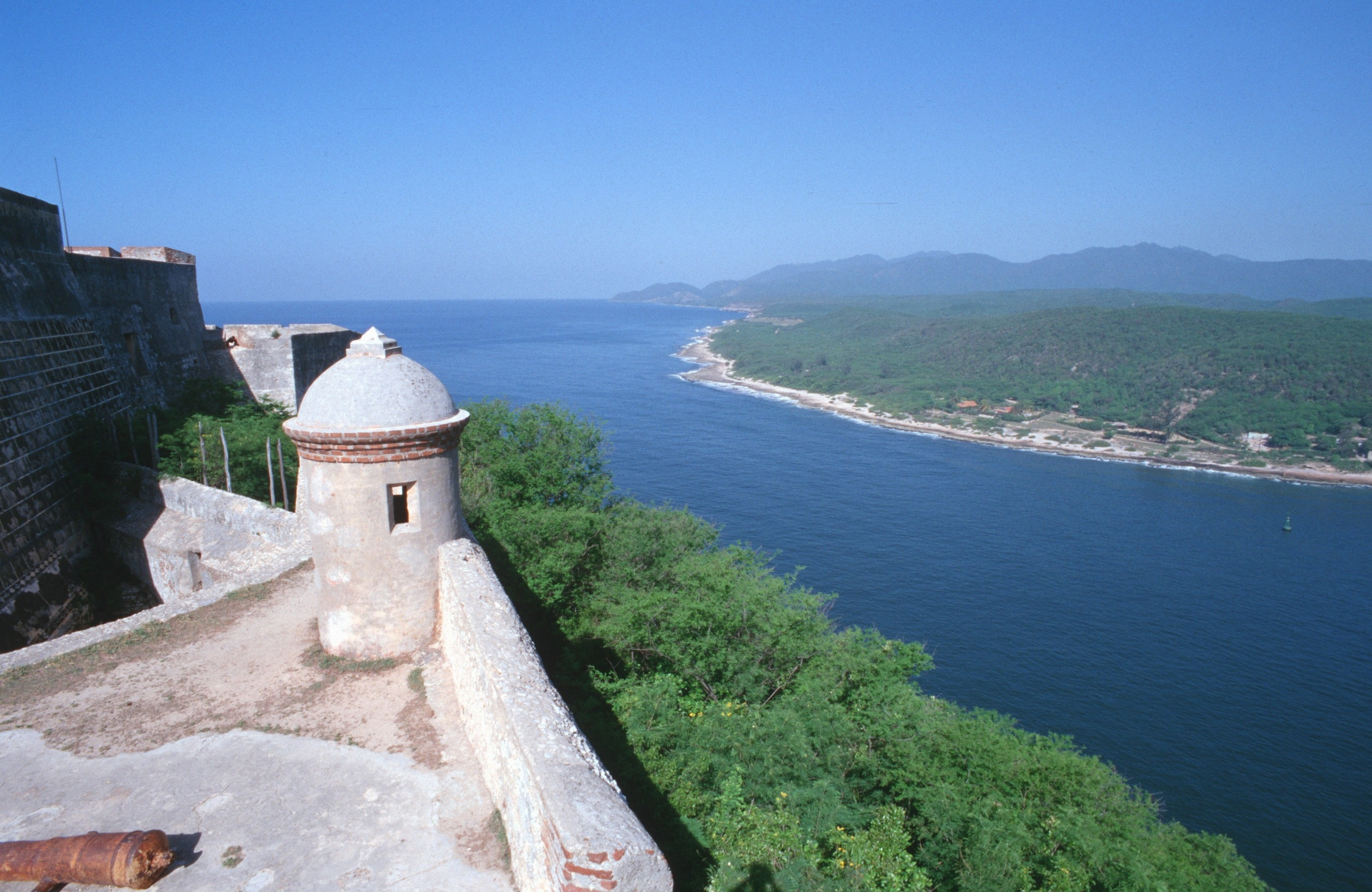
View over the bay from the fortress

The fear of pirate attacks was well-founded. While the fortress was still being constructed in 1662, English freebooters under the guidance of Christopher Myngs sortied from Jamaica, attacked and took control of Santiago for two weeks. During their stay, they destroyed part of the fortification and captured the artillery. After they departed, the Spanish government ordered the reconstruction of the damaged part of the fortress and raised the garrison to 300 men. Between 1663 and 1669 the engineers Juan Císcara Ibáñez, Juan Císcara Ramirez and Francisco Perez worked on repairing the damage and improving the fortifications, strengthening the flanks and constructing a new artillery platform. In 1678 it frustrated the attack of a French squadron and in 1680 fought off another attack by 800 men led by Franquesma, the second-in-command of the Antilles filibusters.

Between 1675 and 1692 the fortress was damaged by a series of earthquakes and reconstruction had to be carried out under the direction of Francisco Pérez between 1693 and 1695. From 1738–1740 further work was undertaken by the engineer Antonio de Arredondo, who enlarged the citadel and completed some of the unfinished platforms, with Juan Martín Cermeño and Francisco Calderín making the final changes to the structure after it was again damaged by earthquakes between 1757 and 1766.

By 1775, the fear of attack had diminished, and the parts of fortress known as the Rock (la Roca) and the Star (la Estrella) were converted into a prison for political prisoners, although the rest of the fortress continued to serve as a military base. It was again used as a fortress in 1898 when the United States' fleet attacked Santiago de Cuba during the Spanish–American War.

During the 20th century the fort fell into disrepair, but it was restored during the 1960s by Francisco Prat Puig.

== Gallery ==
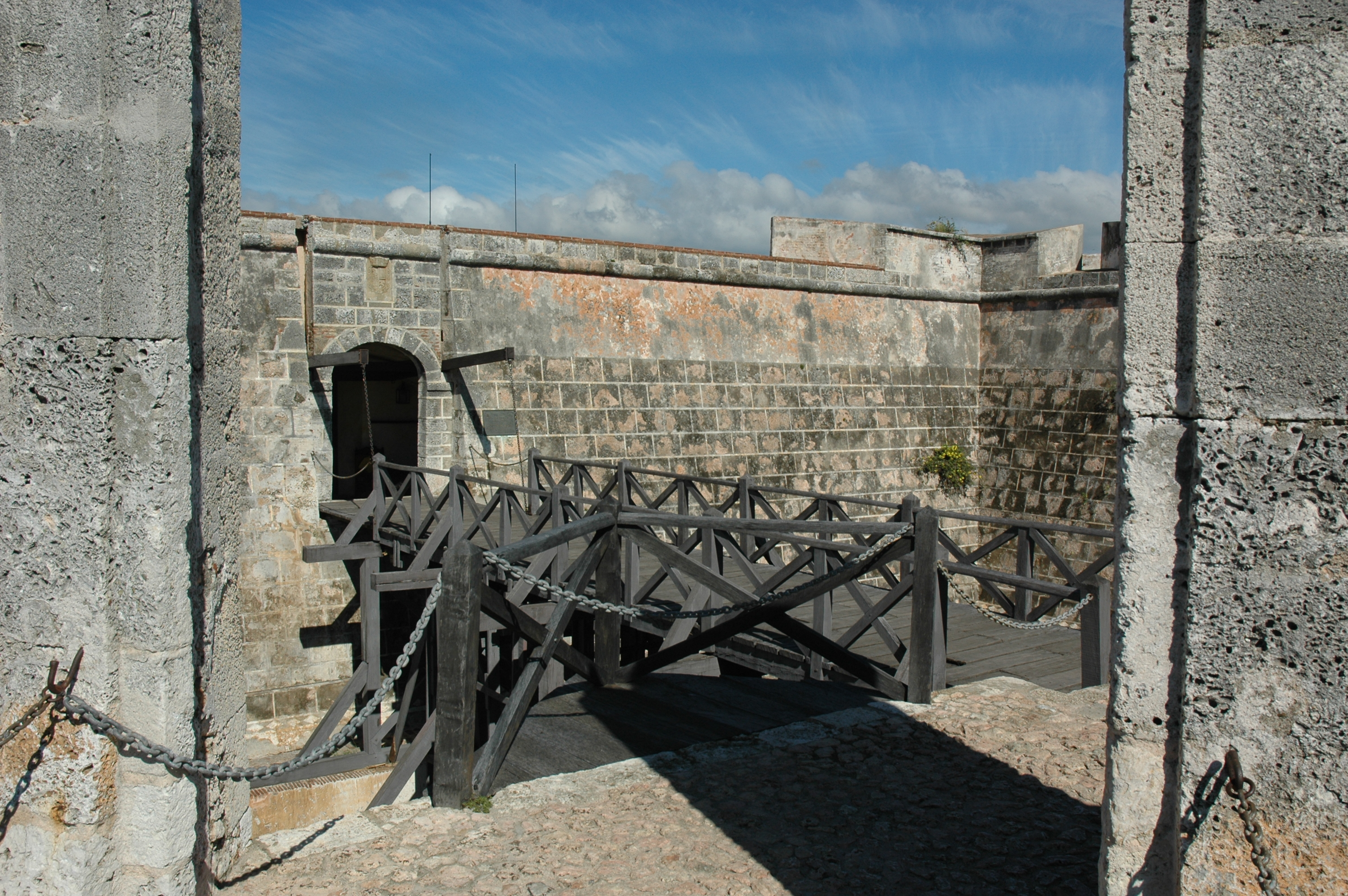
Inside the fortress

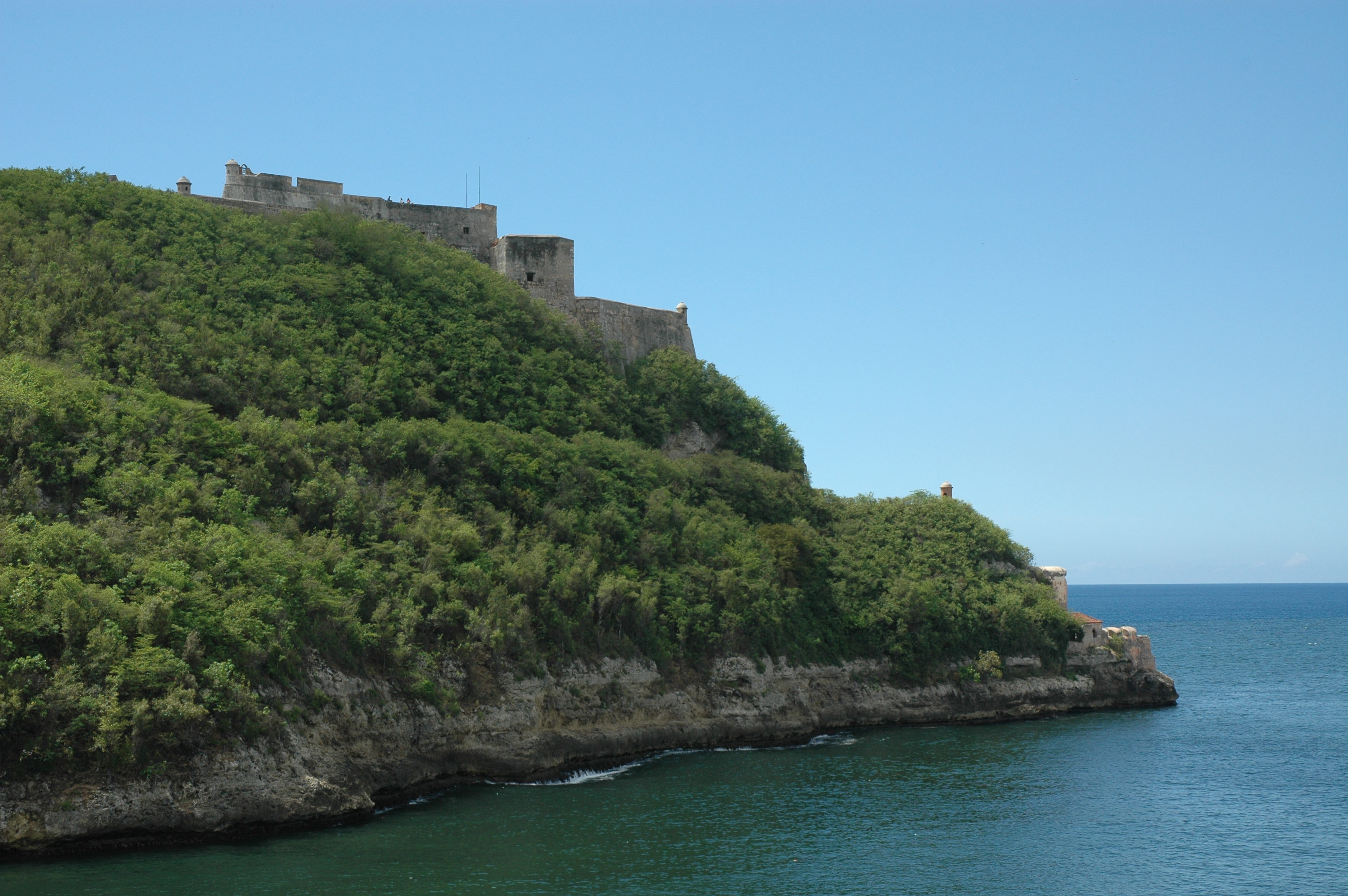
Distant view of the fortress

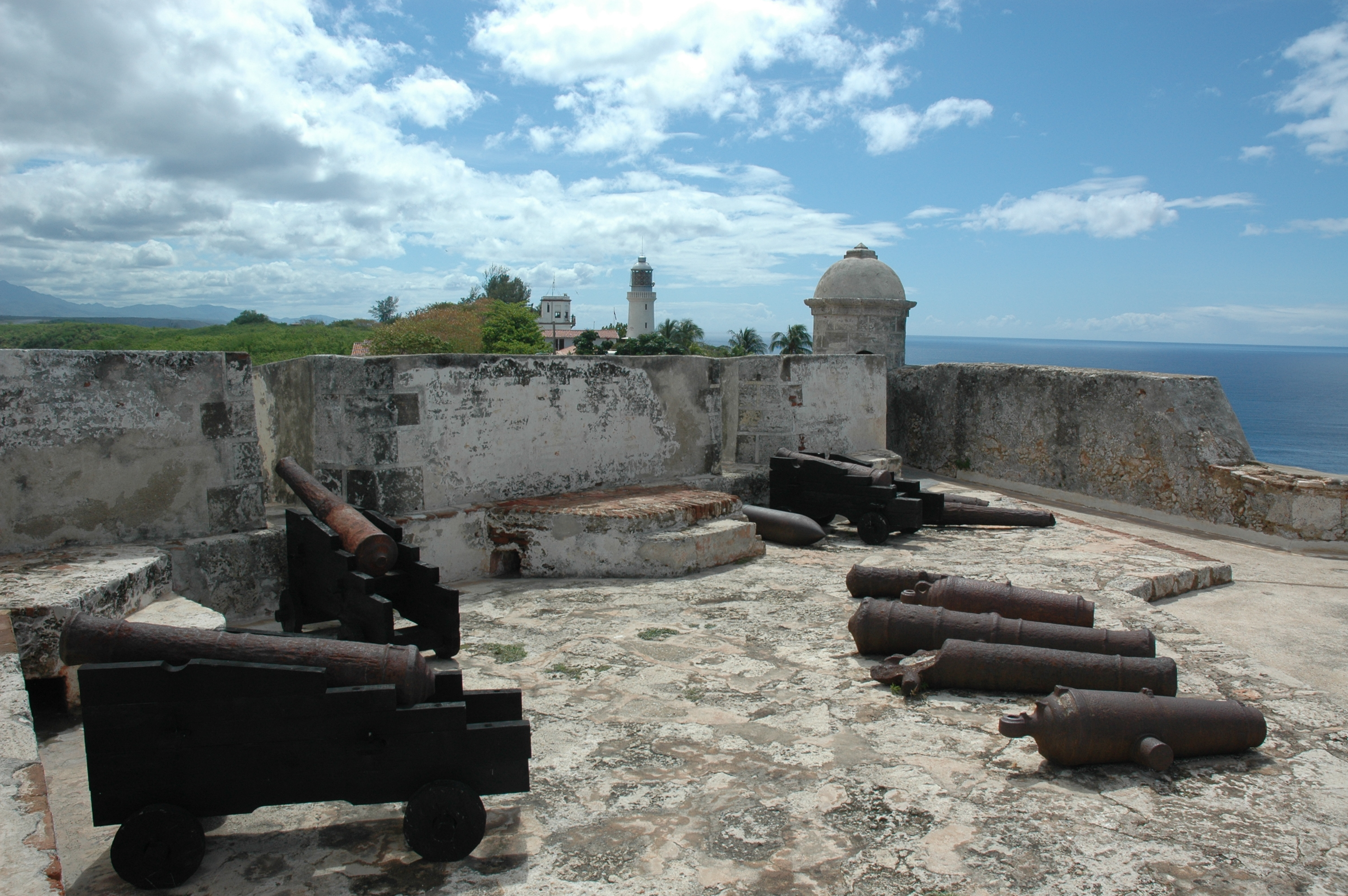
Cannons seen inside the fortress

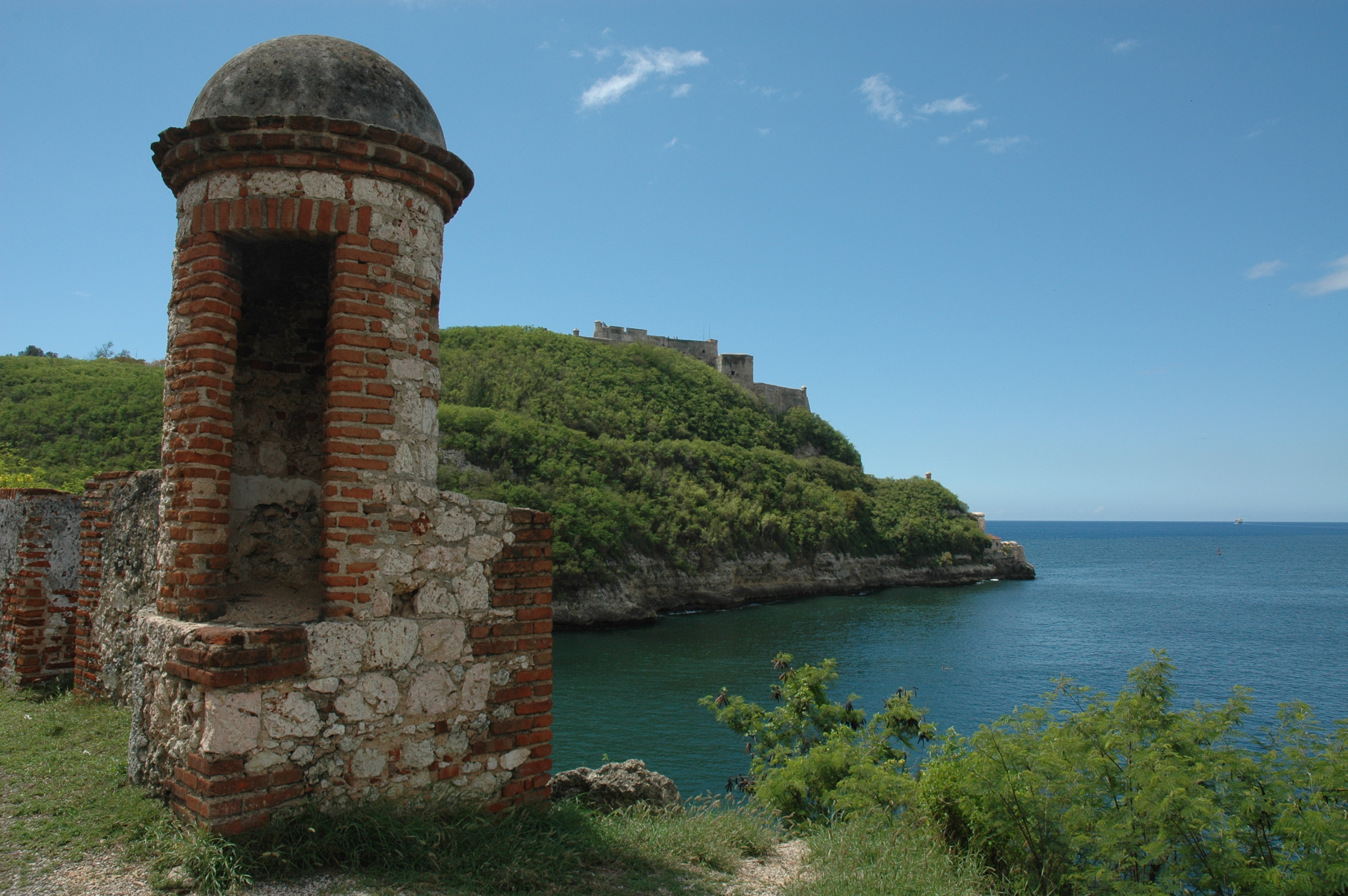
View of bay

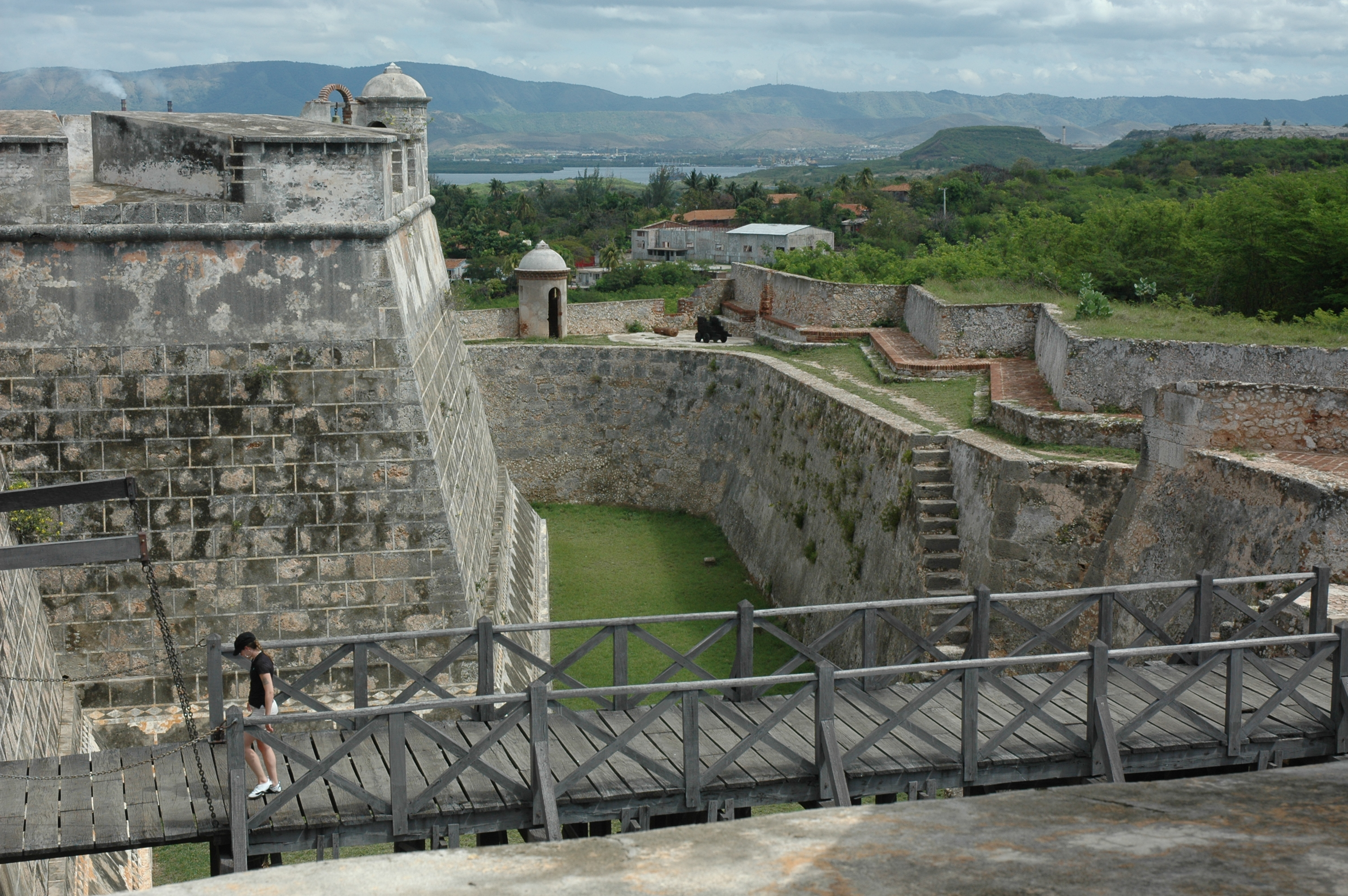
Inside the fortress

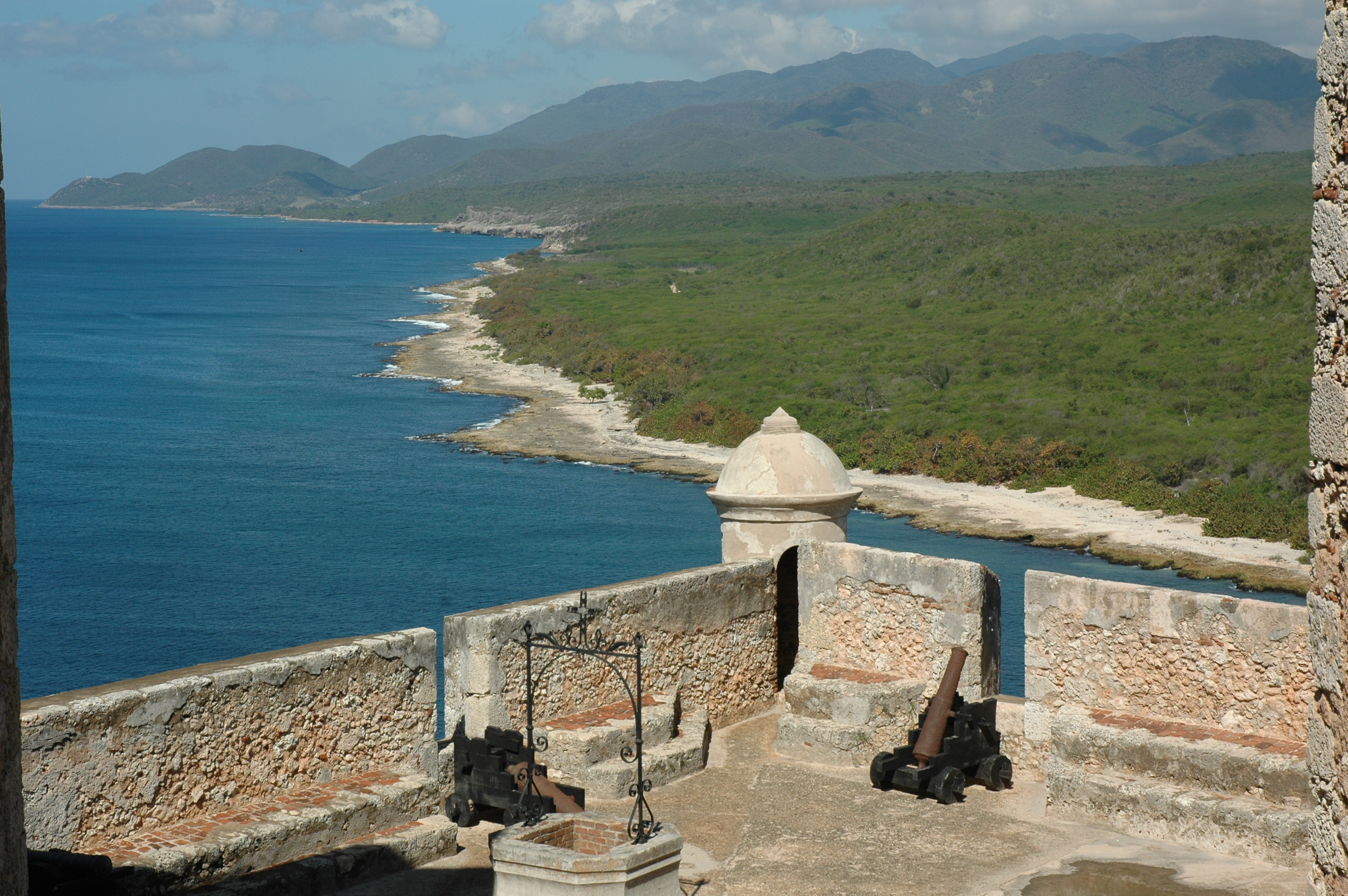
View of bay from the fortress

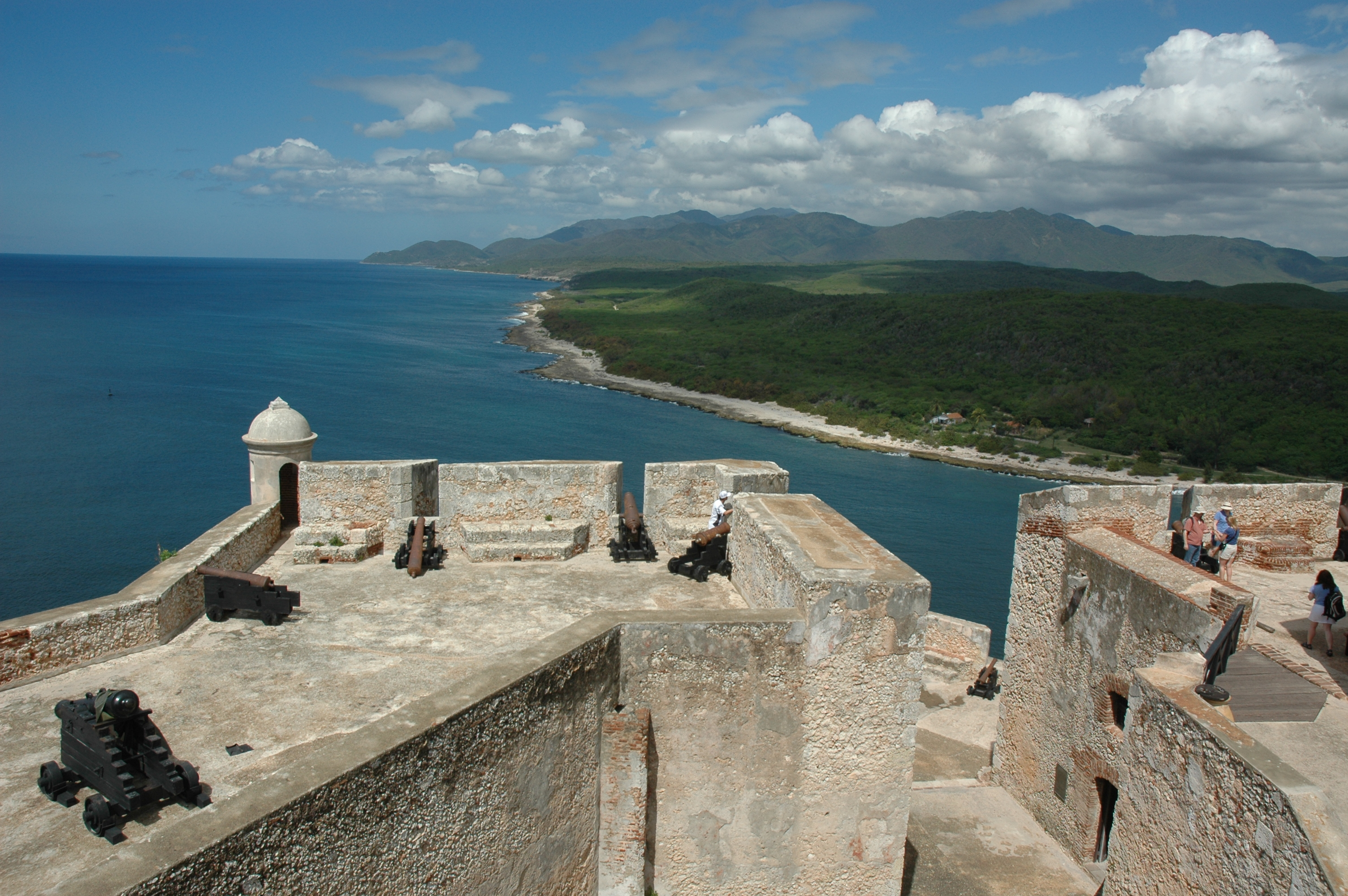
View of bay from the fortress

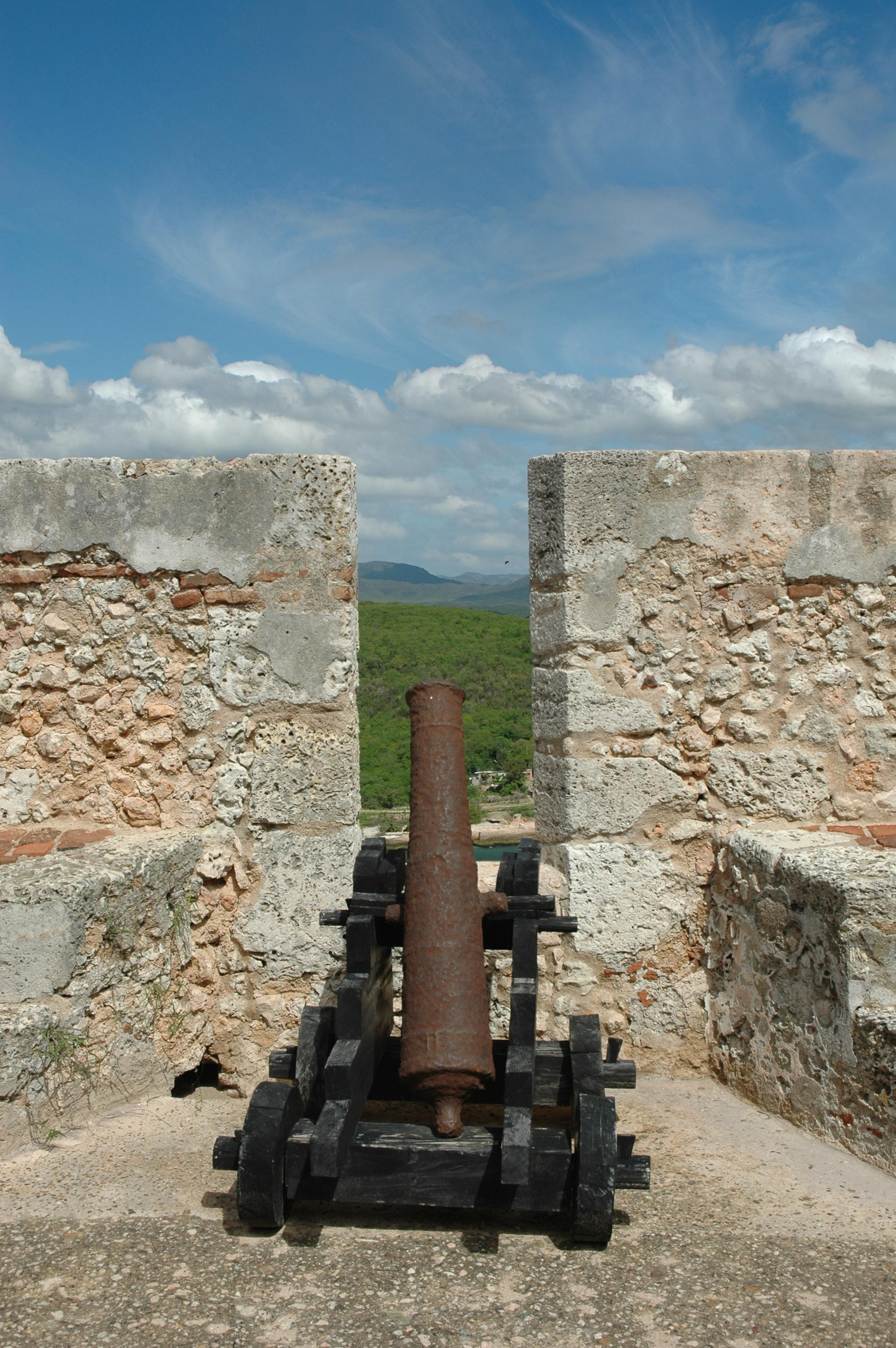
Cannon inside the fortress

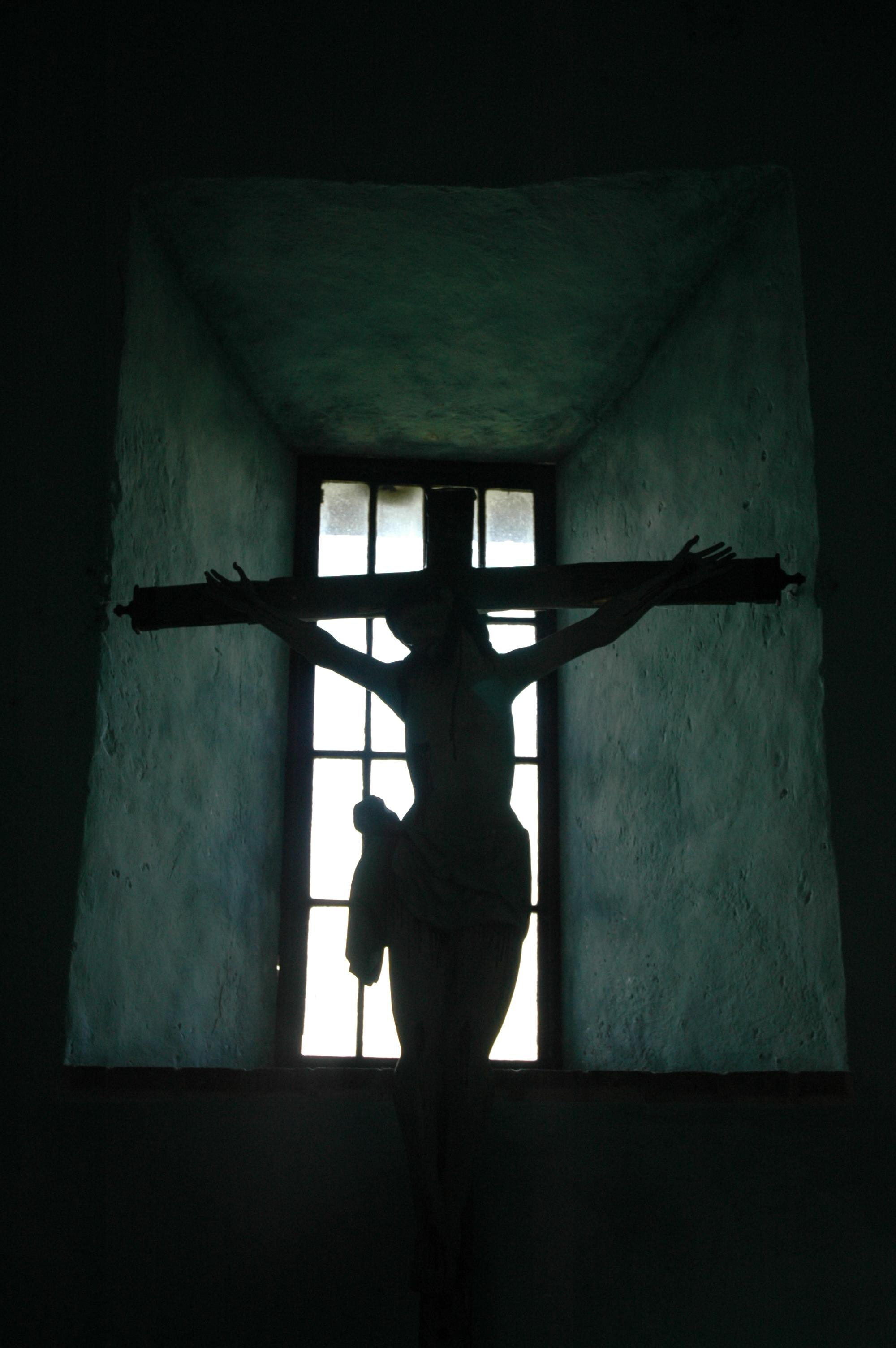
Cross seen inside the fortress

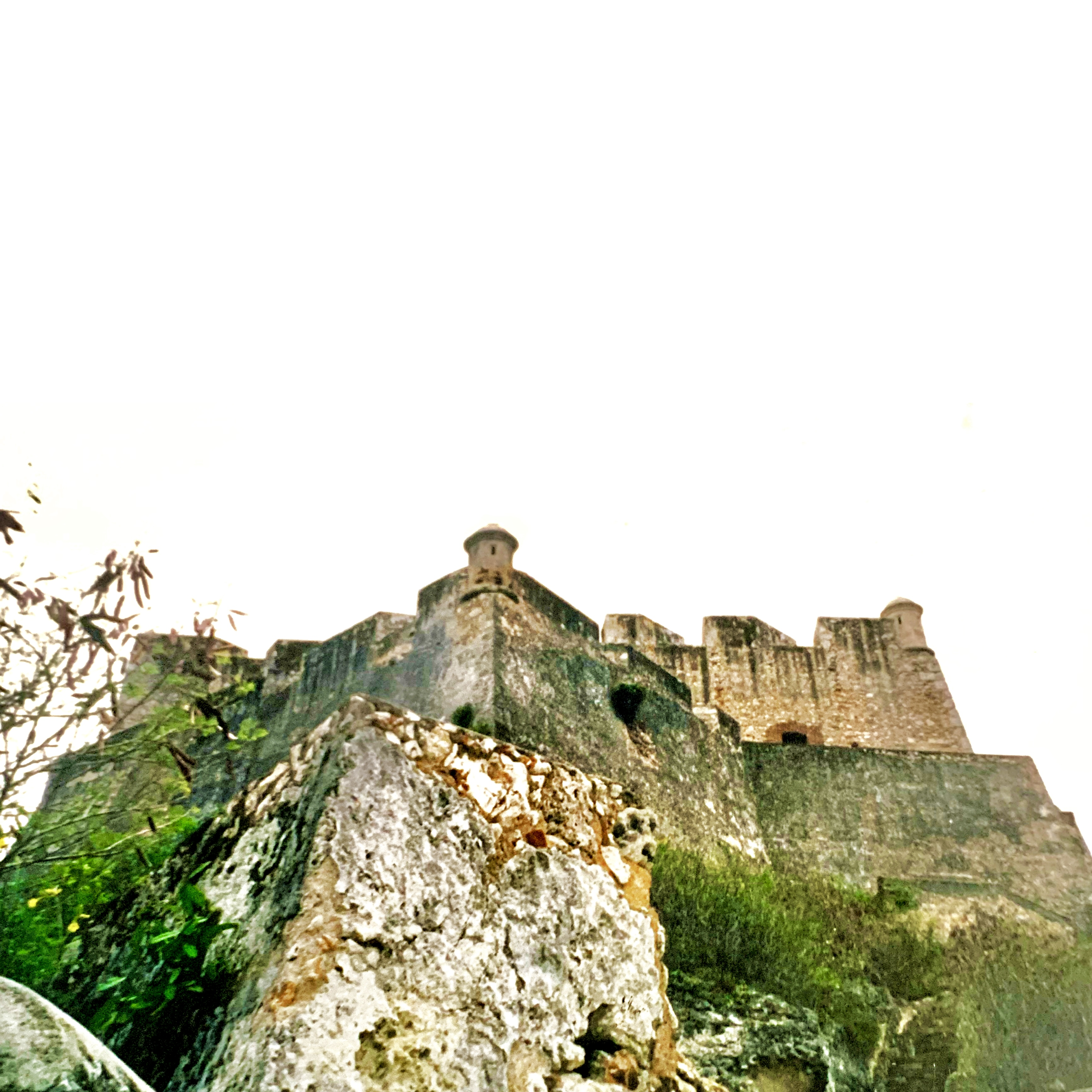
Castle seen from bottom view
