= Josep Roca i Fontané =

Spanish sommelier (born 1966)

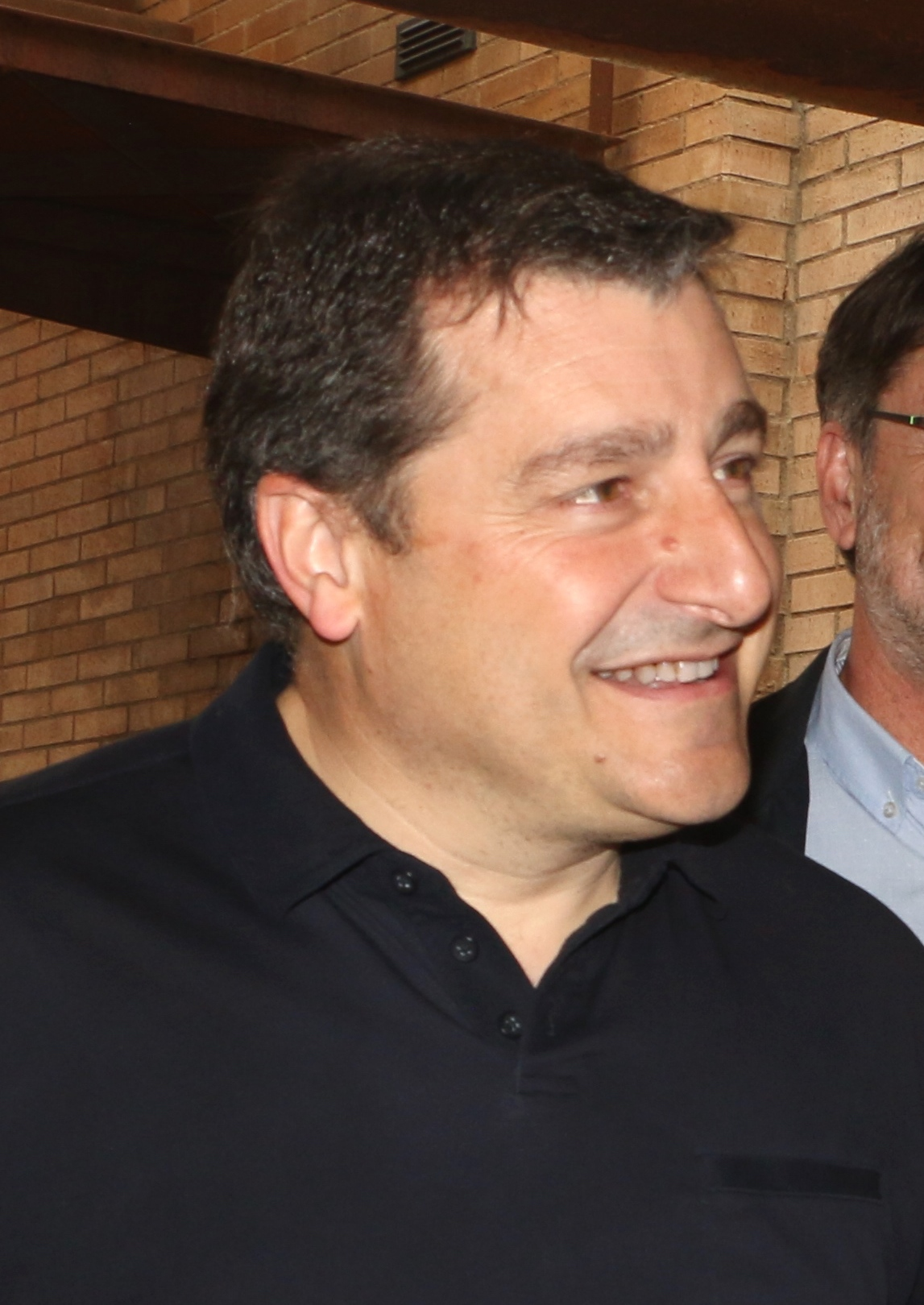
- Born: 26 August 1966 (age 59); Girona, Catalonia, Spain
- Occupation: Sommelier

Josep Roca i Fontané (born 26 August 1966, Girona, Spain) is the sommelier of the restaurant El Celler de Can Roca.

He co-owns El Celler de Can Roca with his other two brothers.

== Acknowledgments ==
- 2022. Beronia World's Best Sommelier Award, by The World's 50 Best Restaurants.

== Publications ==
- El Celler de Can Roca, by Joan, Josep and Jordi Roca. In Catalan, Spanish and English.

== See also ==
- Haute cuisine
