= Jordi Roca =

Spanish pastry chef

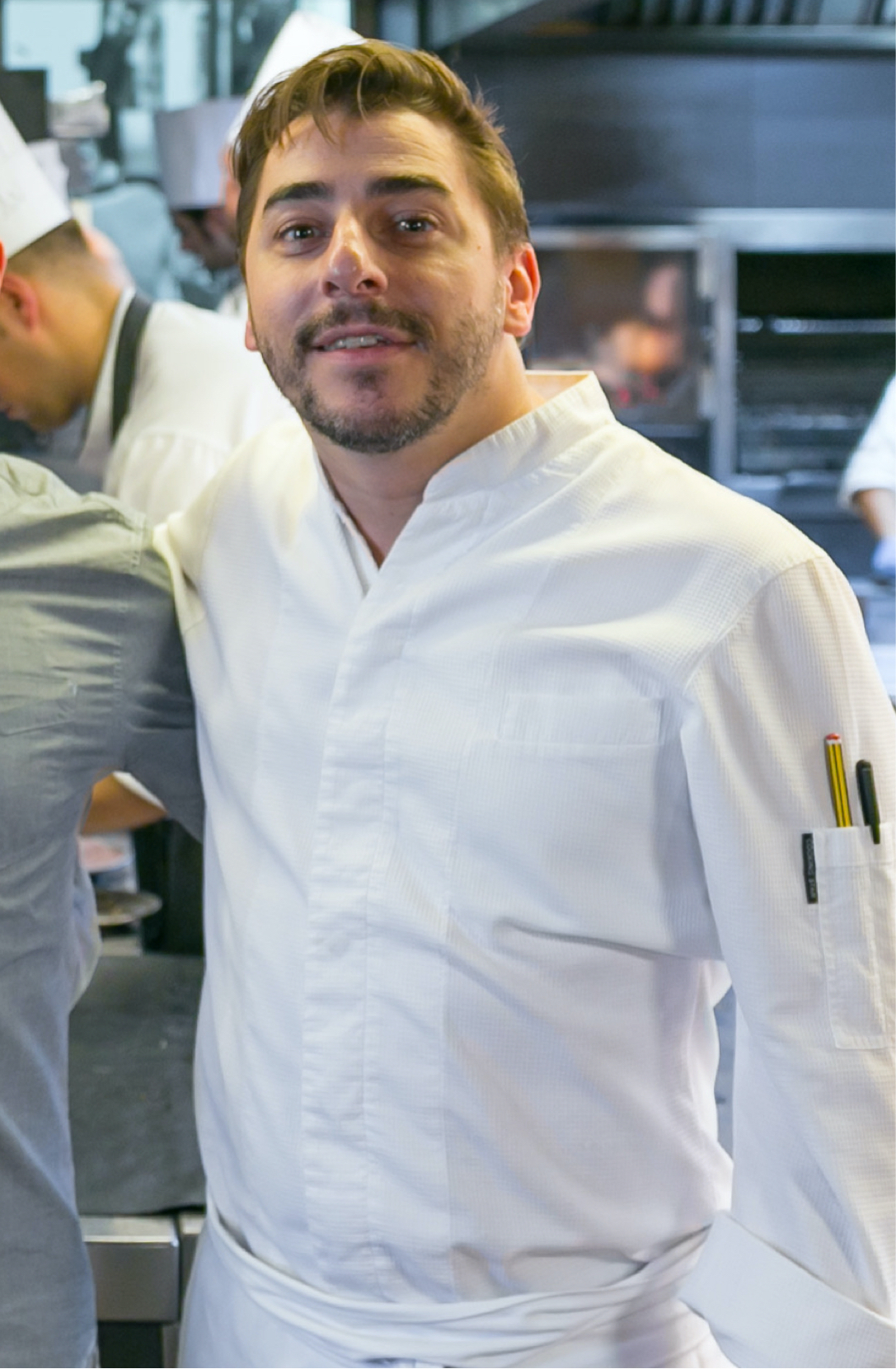
- Roca in September 2014
- Born: Jordi Roca i Fontané; 28 November 1978 (age 47); Girona, Catalonia, Spain
- Education: Apprenticeship
- Occupation: Pastry chef
- Culinary career
- Cooking style: Catalan; haute cuisine; molecular gastronomy
- Current restaurant: El Celler de Can Roca (Pastry chef)

Jordi Roca i Fontané (born 2 May 1978) is a Spanish chef, pastry chef of the restaurant El Celler de Can Roca. In 2014, he won the inaugural "World's Best Pastry Chef" award from Restaurant magazine. In April 2018, an episode of Chef's Table: Pastry featuring Roca debuted on Netflix.

He has dysphonia, a neurological disease that has left him permanently hoarse.

== Acknowledgments ==
- 2002. Second Michelin Star for El Celler de Can Roca.
- 2009. Third Michelin Star for El Celler de Can Roca. and 5th position in the Restaurant Magazine;
- 2011. Second best restaurant in the world for El Celler de Can Roca, by the Restaurant Magazine;
- 2012. Second best restaurant in the world for El Celler de Can Roca, by the Restaurant Magazine;
- 2013. Best restaurant in the world for El Celler de Can Roca, by the Restaurant Magazine;
- 2014. Second best restaurant in the world for El Celler de Can Roca, by the Restaurant Magazine.
- 2015. Best restaurant in the world for El Celler de Can Roca, by the Restaurant Magazine;

== Publications ==
- Roca, Joan; Roca, Jordi; Roca, Josep (2023). El Celler de Can Roca CCR. Montagud Editores. ISBN 9788472121942.
- Roca, Jordi; Medina, Ignacio (2019). Casa Cacao: The Return Trip to the Origin of Chocolate. Grub Street Cookery. ISBN 9781911621393.
- Roca, Joan; Roca, Jordi; Roca, Josep (2016). El Celler de Can Roca. Grub Street Cookery. ISBN 9781910690291.
- Roca, Jordi (2016). Anarkia. Montagud Editores. ISBN 978-8472121652.
- Roca, Jordi (2015). Cocina en casa los postres de Jordi Roca. Now Books. ISBN 978-8416245277.
- Roca, Jordi (2015). The Deserts of Jordi Roca. Peter Pauper Press. ISBN 9781441308566.
