= Roadrunner: A Film About Anthony Bourdain =

- Theatrical release poster
- Directed by: Morgan Neville
- Produced by: Morgan Neville; Caitrin Rogers
- Edited by: Eileen Myers; Aaron Wickenden
- Music by: Michael Andrews; Sarah Lipstate
- Production companies: CNN Films; HBO Max; Tremolo Productions; Zero Point Zero
- Distributed by: Focus Features
- Release dates: June 11, 2021 (Tribeca); July 16, 2021 (United States)
- Running time: 118 minutes
- Country: United States
- Language: English
- Box office: $5.5 million

Roadrunner: A Film About Anthony Bourdain is a 2021 American documentary film directed and produced by Morgan Neville. The film had its world premiere at the Tribeca Film Festival on June 11, 2021, and was released in the United States on July 16, 2021, by Focus Features. The film grossed $5.5 million at the box office and received critical acclaim but also garnered controversy over its use of artificial intelligence technology to reproduce Bourdain's voice for some audio clips.

The film follows the life and career of chef, author, and travel documentarian Anthony Bourdain, who died by suicide on June 8, 2018, at the age of 61 while on location in France for his CNN show Parts Unknown. The documentary features interviews with David Chang and Éric Ripert, as well as members of the production crew from Parts Unknown. The title alludes to "Roadrunner", a song by The Modern Lovers, that appears in the film.

== Synopsis ==
The documentary is a blend of archival footage and new interviews with Bourdain's friends, family, and coworkers. It covers Bourdain's rise from chef, to best selling author of the memoir Kitchen Confidential, to a world famous television presenter of food and travel shows.

As Bourdain traveled the globe, he developed a greater awareness of the hardships many people face in war zones, disaster areas, developing countries, and least developed countries. Director and producer Tom Vitale remembers the most difficult trip was to the Democratic Republic of the Congo during the first season of Anthony Bourdain: Parts Unknown.

Bourdain is remembered by those who knew him as charismatic and hardworking, yet also prone to moodiness and obsessive behavior. His frequent travel for work led to the end of both his marriages, first to Nancy Putkoski and then Ottavia Busia. His career also kept him from being a regular presence in the life of his daughter, Ariane Busia-Bourdain. David Chang, a friend and fellow chef, recalls how Bourdain hid his dark side behind a happy façade. Chang believes Bourdain never fully addressed personal issues that led to a past heroin addiction. Friend, artist, and fellow addict, David Choe, theorizes that Bourdain replaced heroin with a work addiction.

After Bourdain's marriage to Busia ended, his mental health declined. He questioned what his life's direction should be, and joked more frequently about death. He began dating actress Asia Argento, and threw himself entirely into the relationship. His insistence that Argento be a guest director on Parts Unknown alienated crew members, and he fired his long-time cinematographer Zach Zamboni. Busia recalls that Bourdain distanced himself from her and Ariane. Chang was especially hurt when Bourdain claimed Chang would never be a good father. When Argento revealed that she had been raped by Harvey Weinstein, Bourdain supported the MeToo movement nearly to the point of militancy. Parts Unknown director, Morgan Fallon, thinks Argento may have pulled away from the relationship due to Bourdain's intense personality.

While filming in Alsace, France, Bourdain was distraught over a tabloid story about Argento being seen with another man. Bourdain died by suicide after hanging himself in his hotel room. The public turned Les Halles, a restaurant where Bourdain formerly worked, into a shrine of notes and flowers. Bourdain's friends, family, and coworkers reflect on their personal reactions to his suicide and their lingering grief. Choe defaces a mural of Bourdain because he believes Bourdain would have loved the act of rebellion.

== Production ==
In October 2019, it was announced Morgan Neville would direct and produce a documentary film about Anthony Bourdain, with Focus Features set to distribute, while CNN Films and HBO Max would produce.

== Release ==
The film had its world premiere at the Tribeca Film Festival on June 11, 2021. It was released on July 16, 2021, by Focus Features, after which it will air on CNN and HBO Max on an unspecified date. It is currently available to view on Apple TV and Amazon Prime's online video streaming services. CNN aired the documentary on April 10, 2022.

== Reception ==
=== Box office ===
The film debuted to $1.9 million from 927 theaters, finishing eighth at the box office and marking the best opening for both an indie film and documentary of 2021. In its second weekend the film was leading in the specialty box office with $873,000.

=== Critical response ===
On review aggregator Rotten Tomatoes, the film has an approval rating of 91% based on 150 reviews, with an average rating of 7.8/10. The website's critics' consensus reads, "An emotionally raw and respectful portrait of Anthony Bourdain, Roadrunner marks another unflinchingly honest documentary from director Morgan Neville." On Metacritic, the film holds a weighted average score of 78 out of 100 based on 39 critics, indicating "generally favorable reviews". Audiences surveyed by PostTrak gave the film a 94% positive score, with 61% saying they would definitely recommend it.

Writing for Variety, Owen Gleiberman described the film as "an intimate and fascinating portrait of the beloved celebrity chef and television globe-trotter" and "a spiritual investigation into why [Bourdain's] life ended". He concluded: "Bourdain's death was a tragedy, but Roadrunner suggests it was a tragedy with a touch of destiny." Richard Roeper, writing for the Chicago Sun-Times, gave the film a score of 3.5 stars out of 4 and said that the film is an "insightful and exhilarating and profound and sometimes deeply sad documentary".

Daniel Fienberg, writing for The Hollywood Reporter, described the film as being "an intensely painful documentary, one closer to the center of a raw, thoroughly unhealed, and yet very public, wound than I think I've ever seen before", concluding: "I'm much more comfortable with Roadrunner as a portrait of an evolving, complicated, tragic TV personality … than I am with it as an attempt to make sense of a man who, for whatever reason, no longer wanted to continue living."

Writing for RogerEbert.com, Brian Tallerico gave the film a score of 3.5 stars out of 4, saying that the film is "a fascinating, moving documentary that transcends mere profile piece to reclaim a legacy, and it's as inspirational as its subject" and that it "never feels like it's invading the privacy of a very public figure, revealing how much can be learned about the man and why he mattered largely through what he chose to show us, not through some sort of series of personal revelations", but added that "Neville ... does seem to step back during the darker final year of Bourdain's life." Tallerico concluded: "The best thing I can say about "Roadrunner" is that it has the same impact of Bourdain's best work. ... It may be a story about a tragic death but it is as life-affirming as anything I've seen this year."

Writing for Collider, Matt Goldberg was more critical of the film, giving it a grade of C− and saying: "as the movie nears its conclusion, Neville makes the horrendous mistake of trying to "answer" Bourdain's suicide when there's no answer to be found, nor would finding an answer make any difference", adding that the film "no longer feels like an attempt to understand a complex individual, but rather an attempt from production company CNN Films to salvage a successful CNN show from a narrative it couldn't handle." He concluded: "There are some moments of insight, and it's nice to have his loved ones sing the praises of a man who was widely admired, but in its worst moments, Roadrunner feels like a network's spin for its valuable travel shows rather than an honest attempt to grapple with a difficult legacy."

=== Controversy over use of artificial intelligence ===
Upon the film's wide release, director Morgan Neville stated in an interview with New Yorker writer Helen Rosner that he had hired a software company to create an artificial intelligence (AI) model of Bourdain's voice so that the film could emulate him reciting words that he had written, but for which no recordings of him speaking exist, such as an email he had written to friend David Choe. Neville said there were two other such uses of the technology in the film, but refused to specify what they were, stating, "If you watch the film [...] you probably don't know what the other lines are that were spoken by the A.I., and you're not going to know. We can have a documentary-ethics panel about it later."

The disclosure of the film's use of AI technology, which had not been mentioned prior to the interview or acknowledged within the film itself, caused controversy, with critics saying that it constituted unethical behavior. Neville defended his decision, saying, "There were a few sentences that Tony wrote that he never spoke aloud. With the blessing of his estate and literary agent we used AI technology. It was a modern storytelling technique that I used in a few places where I thought it was important to make Tony's words come alive." Ottavia Busia, Bourdain's ex-wife and executor of his estate, denied that she had been consulted about the use of AI to reproduce Bourdain's voice, tweeting: "I certainly was NOT the one who said Tony would have been cool with that."

Filmmaker and journalist Adam Benzine described Neville's remark about "hav[ing] a documentary-ethics panel about it later" as being "as much problematic as the use of the technology", and added: "But the fact that he discussed it as an ethical debate seems to suggest that he himself knew that he was in dicey territory. And I think that's why so many people in the doc industry have had a hostile reaction to this." Filmmaker Alan Barker, who has lectured on documentary ethics, described the issue of the film's use of AI as being indicative of greater ethical concerns in the documentary field, saying: "There is an unwritten social contract that documentaries are comprised of actualities not contrivances. The Bourdain case is especially bad because so much of the information in a voice recording is non-verbal. That Morgan apparently concealed the fakery until confronted by a reporter makes it far worse."

David Leslie, ethics lead of the Alan Turing Institute, said that the issue showed the importance of disclosing the use of AI in a film to the audience to avoid the possibility of people feeling deceived, but added that the use of AI in documentaries should not be ruled out, saying: "In a world where the living could consent to using AI to reproduce their voices posthumously, and where people were made aware that such a technology was being used, up front and in advance, one could envision that this kind of application might serve useful documentary purposes".

On July 17, Rosner revealed that Neville wrote to her that the idea to use AI "was part of [his] initial pitch of having Tony narrate the film posthumously á la Sunset Boulevard — one of Tony's favorite films and one he had even reenacted himself on Cook's Tour", adding: "I didn't mean to imply that Ottavia thought Tony would've liked it. All I know is that nobody ever expressed any reservations to me." Rosner also revealed that Busia had told her via email that she did recall Neville bringing up the idea of using AI, but didn't realize that it had been used. Busia wrote to Rosner: "I do believe Morgan thought he had everyone's blessing to go ahead. I took the decision to remove myself from the process early on because it was just too painful for me."
