= Eric Ripert =

French chef, author, and television personality

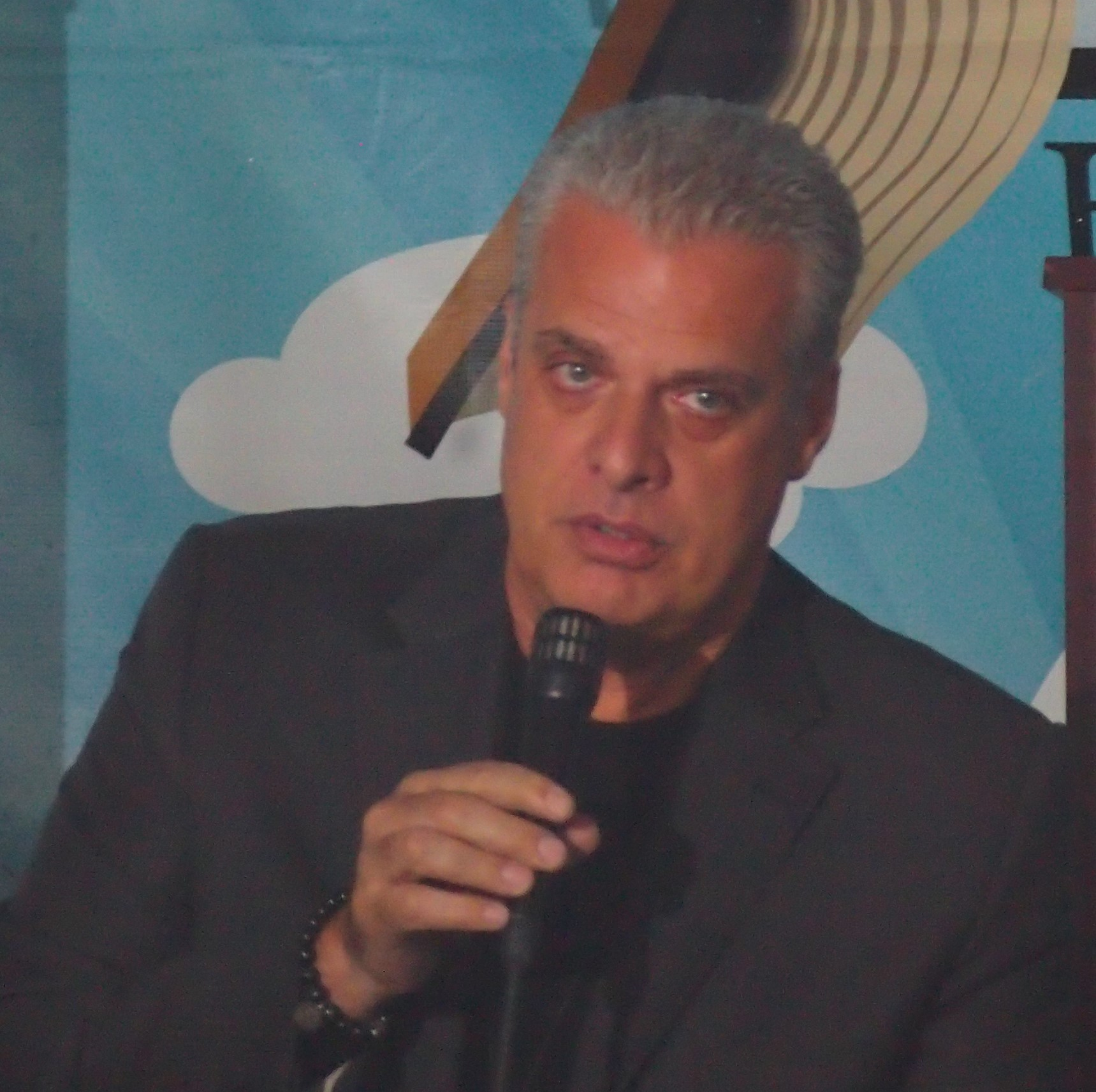
- Ripert at Le Bernardin, photograph by Nigel Parry, 2023
- Born: Eric Frank Ripert; 2 March 1965 (age 61); Antibes, France
- Education: Culinary school in Perpignan, France
- Spouse: Sandra Nieves
- Children: Adrien
- Culinary career
- Ratings
- Michelin stars; The New York Times
- Current restaurants
- Le Bernardin; Blue; Aldo Sohm Wine Bar
- Television shows
- The Restaurant; Anthony Bourdain: Parts Unknown; Avec Eric: Nominated at the Emmy awards for "Outstanding Culinary Host" 2016; winner of "Outstanding Culinary Program" 2011
- Website: ericripert.com

Eric Ripert (French: [ʁipɛʁ]; born 2 March 1965) is a French chef, author, and television personality specializing in modern French cuisine and noted for his work with seafood.

Ripert's flagship restaurant, Le Bernardin, in Midtown Manhattan, New York has been ranked among the best restaurants in the world by culinary magazines and the most prestigious culinary ranking systems around the globe. From 2022 to the present, Le Bernardin has been ranked No.1 on "La Liste", an annual list. It has held the maximum rating of four stars for over three decades from The New York Times and three stars from the Michelin Guide.

== Early life and education ==
Ripert was born in Antibes, France southwest of Nice and learned to cook as a child from his mother. When he was young, his parents divorced and he moved to Andorra with his mother, where he grew up. His mother remarried, and his stepfather was abusive. Ripert's father died in an accident on a hiking trip when Eric was 11. At the age of 15, Ripert left home to attend a culinary school in Perpignan, France east of Andorra.

== Culinary career ==
At 17, he moved to Paris where he worked for two years at La Tour d'Argent, a famous restaurant which claims to be more than 400 years old. Next, he worked at Jamin under Joël Robuchon and was soon promoted to Assistant Chef de Partie. In 1985 Ripert left to fulfill his military service, after which he returned to Jamin as Chef Poissonier. In 1989, he moved to Washington, D.C. and was hired as a sous chef in the Watergate Hotel's Jean Louis Palladin restaurant. He left for New York in 1991, working briefly as David Bouley's sous-chef before Maguy and Gilbert Le Coze recruited him to be the chef for Le Bernardin. In 1994, Ripert became executive chef of Le Bernardin following the death of Gilbert Le Coze. Le Coze had already begun entrusting him with increasing responsibility in the kitchen. In 1995, at 29, Ripert earned a four-star rating from The New York Times, and in 1996 he became a part-owner of the restaurant.

In the NYC 2006 Michelin Guide, Ripert's Le Bernardin was one of four New York City restaurants to be awarded the maximum three Michelin stars for excellence in cuisine. Le Bernardin received four stars from The New York Times six consecutive times, making it the only restaurant to maintain an exquisite status for that length of time and never dropping a star. Ripert has since firmly established himself as one of New York's and the world's great chefs. In September 2014, Ripert and Maguy Le Coze opened Aldo Sohm Wine Bar, named for their wine director Aldo Sohm. In the same month, the two expanded Le Bernardin's private dining offerings beginning Le Bernardin Privé.

== Media career ==
Ripert has made several guest appearances on cooking-based television shows, including guest judge and assistant chef roles on the second, third, fourth, and fifth seasons of Bravo TV's Top Chef. Ripert appeared in many episodes of A Cook's Tour, Anthony Bourdain: No Reservations, and Anthony Bourdain: Parts Unknown. In September 2009, Avec Eric, Ripert's first TV show, debuted on PBS and ran for two seasons, earning two Daytime Emmy Awards: Outstanding Culinary Program (2011) and Outstanding Achievement in main title and graphic design (2010). Avec Eric returned for a third season on the Cooking Channel in February 2015 and is available through iTunes and Netflix.

Ripert launched a series of brief online cooking videos called "Get Toasted" on his website, focusing on easy and quick meals which can be prepared and cooked in minutes with a toaster oven. In 2010, he played himself in the television show Treme on HBO (season 1 episode 5), alongside David Chang, Wylie Dufresne, and Tom Colicchio. Ripert returned in a cameo role in Season 2, in multiple episodes. Ripert appeared in Netflix's original series Chef's Table, in an episode about Jeong Kwan (Season 3 Episode 1) airing in 2017.

Ripert has a brief cameo as a cooking instructor in the 2026 film Tony, about a summer that a young Anthony Bourdain spent in Provincetown, Massachusetts in the mid-1970s.

== Books ==
In 2021 and 2023 Ripert published his newest books "Vegetable Simple" and "Seafood Simple", which both became instant best sellers on the New York Times best seller list. In 2014, he released My Best: Eric Ripert (Alain Ducasse Publishing). In 2016, he published his memoir: 32 Yolks: From My Mother's Table to Working the Line (Random House), which also was a The New York Times bestseller.

In the fall of 2008, Ripert published On the Line, his second cookbook with Artisan, which in 2002 published A Return to Cooking, a collaboration between Ripert, photographers Shimon and Tammar Rothstein, artist Valentino Cortazar, and writer Michael Ruhlman which was selected by Newsweek as one of its best books of the season. Ripert's first cookbook, Le Bernardin – Four Star Simplicity (Clarkson Potter), was published in 1998.

== Philanthropic activity ==
Eric Ripert is vice chairman of the board of City Harvest, the first and largest food rescue organization in New York City. For three years, he has hosted the Tibetan Aid Project's Taste & Tribute New York benefit dinner and auction at his Manhattan restaurant, Le Bernardin. "Funds raised at the annual Taste & Tribute benefit dinners help support efforts to restore Tibetan-language texts to libraries all over the Himalayan region... this project has led to the distribution of nearly two million traditional Buddhist texts—one of the largest free book distributions in history.

== Published works ==
- Le Bernardin Cookbook (co-authored with Maguy Le Coze),1998, ISBN 0-385-48841-6
- A Return to Cooking (co-authored with Michael Ruhlman) (2002), ISBN 1-57965-187-9
- On the Line: The Stations, the Heat, the Cooks, the Costs, the Chaos, and the Triumphs (co-authored with Christine Muhlke), November 2008, ISBN 1-57965-369-3
- Avec Eric: A Culinary Journey with Eric Ripert (2010), ISBN 978-0-470-88935-0
- My Best: Eric Ripert (2014)
- 32 Yolks: From My Mother's Table to Working the Line (17 May 2016) with Veronica Chambers
- Vegetable Simple (2021), ISBN 978-0-593-13248-7
- Seafood Simple (2023), ISBN 978-0-593-44952-3

== Awards ==
- "#1" Restaurant in the World by La Liste 2018, 2022-present
- Four stars (since 1995) by The New York Times
- Three stars (since 2005) by the Michelin Guide
- World's 50 Best Restaurants (since 2006)
- Forbes All-Star Eateries: Four stars (since 2000) by Forbes
- AAA Five Diamond (since 2013) by the American Automobile Association
- Mentor Chef Award (2022) by the Michelin Guide
- "Best Restaurant in America" (1997) by GQ
- "Best Food in New York City" (2000–2007) by Zagat
- "Outstanding Restaurant of the Year" (1998) by the James Beard Foundation
- "Top Chef in New York City" (1998) by the James Beard Foundation
- "Outstanding Service Award" (1999) by the James Beard Foundation
- "Outstanding Chef of the Year" (2003) by the James Beard Foundation

== Personal life ==
Ripert and his wife Sandra (née Nieves) have a son. Ripert is a Buddhist, and meditates for an hour every morning.

Ripert was very close friends with chef Anthony Bourdain. Bourdain's 2000 book Kitchen Confidential was the first book Ripert read in English; afterwards he called Bourdain and the two met, becoming friends. Ripert's first TV appearance with Bourdain was on A Cook's Tour in 2002. Bourdain featured Ripert's restaurant Le Bernardin on No Reservations, and Ripert was often a guest on that show and on Parts Unknown. Bourdain was also supportive of Ripert's writing career. Ripert introduced Bourdain's second wife, Ottavia Busia, to him after Bourdain and his first wife, Nancy Putkoski, divorced. Ripert was in France with Bourdain in June 2018 for an episode of Parts Unknown when he found Bourdain unresponsive in his hotel room; Bourdain's death was ruled a suicide. Ripert paid respects to Bourdain on social media afterwards and, alongside chef José Andrés, promoted June 25 (Bourdain's birthday) as Bourdain Day in 2020.
