= Cook's Tour =

Cook's Tour and similar may refer to:

- Cook's Tour, a nickname also used in former advertisements for tours of Thomas Cook
- "Cook's Tour", an episode of Silk Stalkings
- "Cook's Tour", an episode of Emergency!
- A Cook's Tour (book), a book by Anthony Bourdain
- A Cook's Tour (TV series)

== See also ==
- Kook's Tour, a 1970 film
