= Typhoid Mary: An Urban Historical =

2001 book by Anthony Bourdain

Typhoid Mary
- Author: Anthony Bourdain
- Original title: Typhoid Mary: An Urban Historical
- Language: English
- Genre: Memoir/Travel
- Published: 2001 (Bloomsbury Press)
- Publication place: United States
- Media type: Print (Hardback)
- Pages: 160
- ISBN: 9781582341330
- Preceded by: A Cook's Tour
- Followed by: The Nasty Bits

Typhoid Mary: An Urban Historical is a 2001 book by Anthony Bourdain about Mary Mallon a.k.a. "Typhoid Mary", published by Bloomsbury USA. The book is an entry in the "Urban Historical" collection. Tim Carman, of The Washington Post, described it as "an odd, unlikely follow-up to" Kitchen Confidential.

Adam Shatz of The New York Times wrote that Mallon being a "non-American" and a "tough-as-nails, foulmouthed, trash-talking female line cook" made her a subject of interest for Bourdain.

Bourdain puts in his own commentary along with biographical details about Mallon. John DeMers of the Houston Chronicle wrote "There is no guarantee that Mallon felt even remotely the feelings Bourdain has her feeling, since people's reactions to life are formed at least partly by their world." Carman stated that Bourdain initially has a sympathetic view of Mallon and a critical view of George Soper, who Bourdain characterizes as xenophobic, though that it hardens towards Mallon in the portion where she causes illness in a hospital.

== Reception ==
DeMers concluded "For better or worse, this book is all about Bourdain's raspy, streetwise, ever-confrontational voice. You'll love it or hate it."

Shatz stated that the author "presents Mallon's story as a tale of hot pursuit, with the rude gusto and barbed wit that made Kitchen Confidential such a full-bodied pleasure."

Ann Limpert of Entertainment Weekly ranked the book B+ and stated that the book had "raw, readable prose".
