= Down and Out in Paradise =

Biography of Anthony Bourdain

Down and Out in Paradise: The Life of Anthony Bourdain
- First edition
- Author: Charles Leerhsen
- Language: English
- Subject: Anthony Bourdain
- Genre: Biography
- Publisher: Simon & Schuster
- English publication date: October 11, 2022

Down and Out in Paradise: The Life of Anthony Bourdain by Charles Leerhsen is a 2022 unauthorized biography of celebrity chef Anthony Bourdain.

== Critical reception ==
Slate wrote "A solidly researched and, despite its press, not especially lurid biography, Down and Out in Paradise has a stubborn resistance to psychologizing its subject that—along with the use of such antique terms as "the boob tube" and "red-blooded American male"—gives it a dated air. It reads as if it were written in 1999, the year that Bourdain's life changed as a result of the publication of Don't Eat Before Reading This, the sensational New Yorker article that became the basis for his bestselling book, 2000's Kitchen Confidential."

The New York Times said in its review "Down and Out in Paradise is not the most subtle thing you'll ever read. Leerhsen is a former executive editor at Sports Illustrated whose previous books include biographies of Ty Cobb and Butch Cassidy. His Bourdain book goes down like a mass-market rock bio. I'd have loved it if I were 17. The author goes all in on Bourdain's angst, his instinctive distrust of authority, his hero-worship of talented outsiders like Hunter S. Thompson and Iggy Pop and William S. Burroughs."

The Los Angeles Times wrote "Down and Out is a suicide whodunit framed as a biography; some of the many friends and family who declined to speak with Leerhsen have claimed that much in the book is inaccurate. Still, it reads as a sincere, if single-minded, attempt to look at the actual events of Bourdain's life."

The Guardian wrote "For all its perceptiveness, Down and Out in Paradise is marred by its tendency to constantly tie Bourdain's life to the circumstances of his death: the book returns frequently to the subject, constantly foreshadows it, and closes, somewhat abruptly, with his funeral. That short-changes Bourdain."
