= Nasty Bits =

Nasty Bits may refer to:

- "Nasty Bits" (EP), a promotional single by Beastie Boys, used to promote Hello Nasty
- The Nasty Bits, a book by Anthony Bourdain
- "Nasty bits", a commonly used alternate name for offal, often used in an endearing, ironic way

== See also ==
- Soft error, when data is misread in electronics and computing resulting in "bad bits", or "flipped bits"
