= Medium Raw =

Medium Raw may refer to:

- Medium Raw (book), a book by Anthony Bourdain
- Medium Raw: Night of the Wolf, a film written and directed by Andrew Cymek

== See also ==
- Medium rare
