= Diot (surname) =

Diot is a surname. Notable people with the surname include:

- André Diot (born 1935), French cinematographer and lighting designer
- Antoine Diot (born 1989), French basketball player
- Jean Diot and Bruno Lenoir (died 1750), French men executed for homosexuality
- Jean-Michel Diot (born 1959), French chef and restaurateur
- Maurice Diot (1922–1972), French road bicycle racer
