= Brasserie Les Halles =

Restaurant in New York City

Coordinates: 40°44′36.82″N 73°59′1.26″W

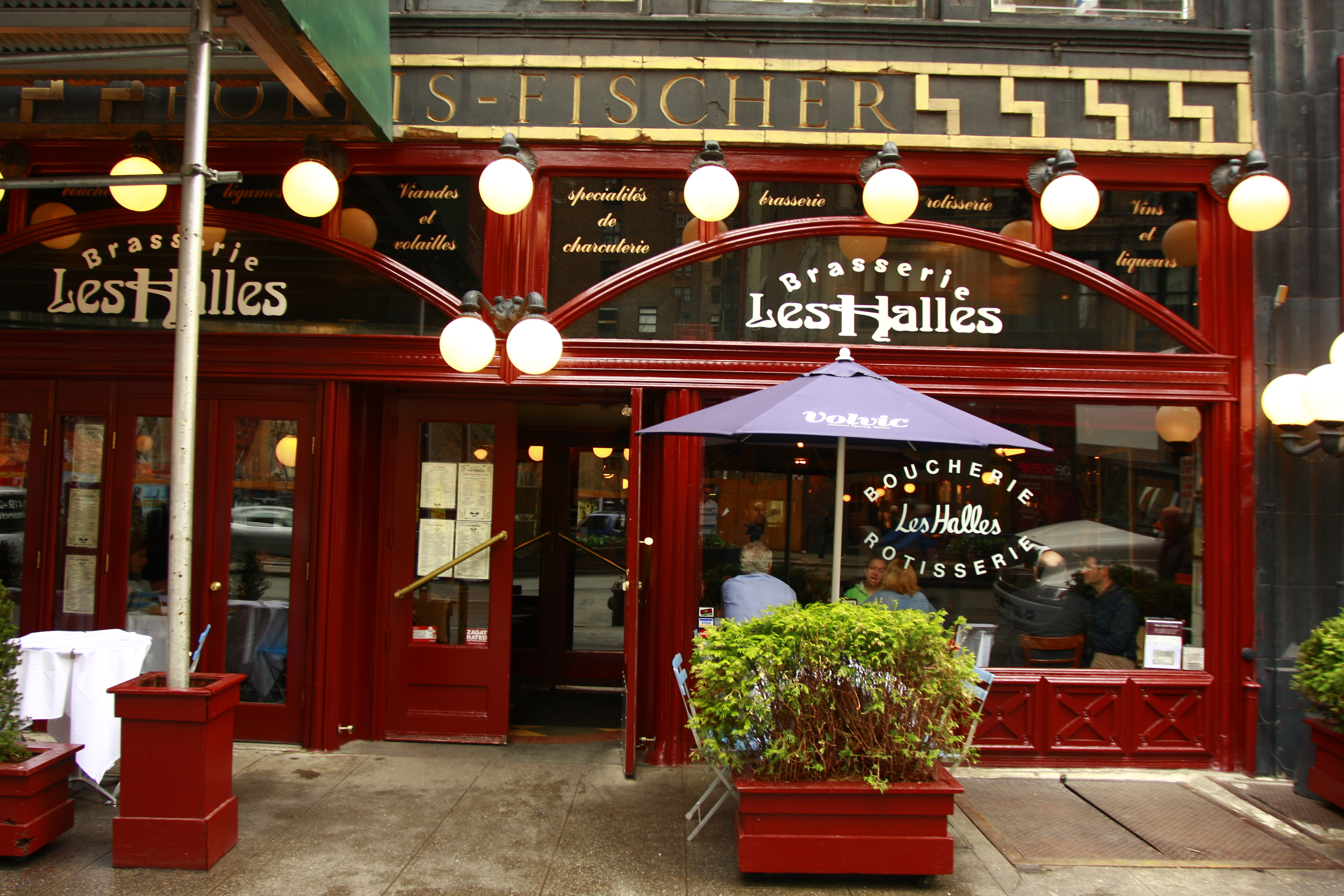
- Park Avenue South Location
- Interactive map of Brasserie Les Halles

Restaurant information
- Food type: French bistro steakhouse
- Location: 411 Park Avenue South, Manhattan, New York City, New York, United States

Brasserie Les Halles was a French-brasserie-style restaurant originally located on Park Avenue in Manhattan, New York City. Other locations were on John Street in Manhattan, in Tokyo, Miami, and Washington, D.C.

Author and television host Anthony Bourdain worked there as executive chef. The restaurant featured prominently in his 2000 book Kitchen Confidential. Les Halles went out of business in August 2017.

== History ==
The restaurant was opened at 411 Park Avenue South in 1990 by chefs José de Meirelles, Philippe Lajaunie, and Jean-Michel Diot and named after Les Halles, the historic central wholesale marketplace in Paris. The restaurant served simple and classic French dishes such as escargot, foie gras, and steak tartare, which was prepared to order at tableside, and was renowned for its pommes frites. The original Park Avenue location featured a butcher shop that specialized in French cuts of meat. Author and television host Anthony Bourdain worked there in the late 1990s as executive chef. The Park Avenue location was featured prominently in the book Kitchen Confidential by Bourdain, who also detailed many of Les Halles' recipes in Anthony Bourdain's Les Halles Cookbook. The Downtown New York branch was located at 15 John Street (between Broadway & Nassau Street; in the Financial District) on the site of the former John Street Theatre, "Birthplace of American Theatre."

The Washington, D.C. location of Les Halles closed in mid-November 2008 following a fifteen-year run. Owner Philippe Lajaunie cited difficulty obtaining a new lease as the reason.

In its 2013 user poll, Zagat gave its two New York restaurants each a food rating of 21 out of 30.

Executive chef Carlos Llaguno died of cancer at age 38 in February 2015. Bourdain paid tribute to Llaguno on Facebook saying, "Rest In Peace Chef Carlos Llaguno Garcia. A great friend, a great chef, a great person. He will be missed by all who knew him."

The Park Avenue location of Les Halles closed in March 2016. The Miami location closed as well. Les Halles went out of business in August 2017. In 2018, Les Halles, though closed down, became a memorial to Anthony Bourdain after his suicide.

In March 2022, a new French-style restaurant named La Brasserie was opened in the former Les Halles space on Park Avenue. La Brasserie owner Francis Staub, previously the founder of Staub cookware, had expressed his intent to continue the Brasserie Les Halles philosophy. Some iconic dishes by Anthony Bourdain, such as the Steak Frites, were kept on the menu as an homage. In April 2023 the restaurant was rebranded as 'Chez Francis'. In 2025 the restaurant had shut down permanently due to bankruptcy.

== See also ==
- List of French restaurants
