= Lobster trap (disambiguation) =

A lobster trap is a lobster pot, a trap for lobsters and spiny lobsters.

Lobster trap or lobster pot may also refer to:

- Lobster trap (finance), an anti-takeover strategy
- Lobster-tailed pot helmet, a cavalry helmet
- Lobster Pot (restaurant), a seafood restaurant in Massachusetts, United States
