= A Cook's Tour (book) =

2001 book by Anthony Bourdain

- First edition
- Author: Anthony Bourdain
- Original title: A Cook's Tour: In Search of the Perfect Meal
- Language: English
- Genre: Memoir/Travel
- Published: 2001 (Bloomsbury Press)
- Publication place: United States
- Media type: Print (Hardback & Paperback)
- Pages: 288
- ISBN: 0-06-001278-1
- Preceded by: Kitchen Confidential: Adventures in the Culinary Underbelly
- Followed by: Typhoid Mary

A Cook's Tour: In Search of the Perfect Meal, sometimes later published as A Cook's Tour: Global Adventures in Extreme Cuisines, is a New York Times bestselling book written by chef and author Anthony Bourdain in 2001. It is Bourdain's account of his world travels – eating exotic local dishes and experiencing life as a native in each country. The book was simultaneously made into a television series featuring Bourdain for the Food Network.

== Locations ==
Bourdain's travels included Portugal, France, Vietnam, Russia, Morocco, Japan, Cambodia, Mexico, Spain, and French Laundry in Napa Valley.

== Foods ==
He tries such exotic dishes as pufferfish, still beating cobra heart, "lobster blood" (a mix of lobster sexual organs and vodka), and soft-boiled balut—duck embryo with half-formed bones and feathers.

== Award ==
The book was named 2002 Food Book of the Year by the British Guild of Food Writers.

== Title ==
The title is derived from "Cook's Tour", a British idiomatic phrase meaning a brief or cursory guide to a subject or place. Its origin is in the trips organized by Thomas Cook in the 19th century.
