= Kum Nye =

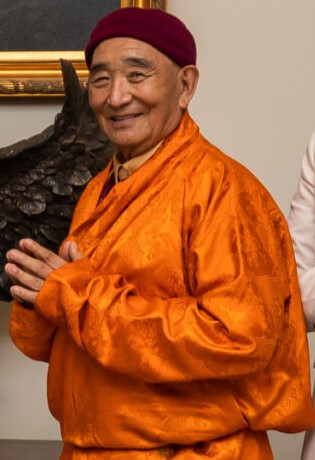
Tarthang Tulku Rinpoche, who introduced Kum Nye to the West, at a Vesak celebration arranged by the White House Office in May 2021

Kum Nye and sKu-mNyé are a wide variety of Tibetan religious and medical body practices.

Many Tibetan Buddhist and Bon traditions contain Kum Nye practices. These can be entirely different both in purpose and in methods. For instance, some forms are very slow-moving; others are intensely aerobic. The Tibetan Medical Tantras (scriptures) are the basis for some practices, and are mainly therapeutic. Dzogchen is the basis for other practices which are mainly religious in purpose.

Three systems of sku mnye have been described and taught in detail in English. These are Kum Nye by Tarthang Tulku, the Aro gTér sKu-mNyé and the systems of bsku mnye, that are taught by the International Academy for Traditional Tibetan Medicine and the Shang Shung Institute.

== Etymology ==
The two terms Kum Nye and sKu-mNyé are different spellings in the Latin alphabet of the same Tibetan phrase Wylie: sku mnye, which literally means "massage of the subtle body". Some forms of sku mnye are vaguely similar to Yoga, Tai chi, Qigong, or therapeutic massage. Kum Nye, Ku Nye, and Kunye are also used to transcribe the Tibetan phrases dku mnye ("belly massage") and bsku mnye (oil massage), pronounced identically to sku mnye. dKu mnye and bsku mnye manipulate the physical body, rather than the subtle (energetic) one.

== Tarthang Tulku's Kum Nye ==
Lama Tarthang Tulku first introduced Kum Nye into the West. He has written five books on the subject.

This system appears to be largely from the Medical Tantras, but includes exercises similar to those found in the Dzogchen series. It is based on very slow movements, stillness practices, and massage. This Kum Nye has been described as Inner Massage.

=== Exercises ===
To give an example, in the exercise called "flying" the practitioner extends their arms slowly out from the side up to stretching above the head and then slowly back down again. One cycle can take anywhere between 2 and 10 minutes. The practice of breathing in and out of both nose and mouth at the same time is recommended while doing the exercises. The key is to pay close attention to the subtleties of sensations and the quality of experience while doing the exercises, thus linking body and mind in the presence of awareness given to the sensations.

== Aro gTér sKu-mNyé ==
This system is part of the Aro gTér, a Nyingma terma. It is described in detail in the book moving being, by Khandro Déchen.

Aro sKu-mNyé belongs to Longdé, the section of Dzogchen concerned with the subtle body. As with all Dzogchen methods, its main goal is to realize rigpa, or non-dual awareness. This is described as "finding the presence of awareness in the dimension of sensation". Physical exercises are used to "shake" the tsa-lung system of energetic "channels", winds", and "essences". This perceptually disorients the practitioner, and produces "zap nyams". Zap nyams (Wylie: zab nyams), literally "profound experiences" in Tibetan, are described as "intense psychophysical sensations". These are said to occur in the energetic space that surrounds the body, rather than in the physical body.

Although the purpose of the Aro gTér sKu-mNyé is mainly religious, the system is said also to have a variety of mundane benefits, including more vivid sensory experience, emotional openness, enhanced meditation, physical fitness, and lessening of depression.

In practice, Aro sKu-mNyé is a set of 111 movement exercises divided into series that correspond to the Buddhist five elements. They range from simple and gentle to vigorous and extremely difficult, and bear no similarity to any other Eastern or Western form of exercise. The moving exercises are alternated with periods of motionless meditation. The instructions for the Aro sKu-mNyé exercises frequently give very specific details about eye movements.

Aro sKu-mNyé is taught by instructors certified by a board headed by the Aro Lamas.

=== Exercise example: "waking lion" ===
lie on your back / legs splayed as far apart as comfortable / arms 90 degrees to your body / palms upwards / eyes closed / simultaneously (with a quick movement) raise your torso and legs (legs straight and locked at the knee) / simultaneously clap feet together and hands together (arms are straight and locked at the elbow) / in the moment of clapping, open eyes wide and shout Ra! (roll the 'R' to enunciate fiercely) / when clapping feet and hands, eyes, hands, and feet should be at the same height – feet and hands meet at the same level as your eyes; and at this point your bottom is all that is touching the floor / it is important that the back is kept absolutely straight / try to achieve an angle of 45 degrees to the floor, but NOT by bending your back – bending the back will result in injury! / Relax back into the starting position and repeat

== IATTM Ku Nye ==
The Ku Nye taught by the International Academy for Traditional Tibetan Medicine is a system of therapeutic oil massage. It is based in the Medical Tantras. Its benefits are said to include elimination of toxins, increased vitality, pain reduction, and calming of nervous disorders including insomnia, depression and anxiety.

== Shang Shung Institute Kunye ==
The Shang Shung Institute, affiliated with Chogyal Namkhai Norbu, offers a training program in Kunye Massage.
