= Tarthang Tulku =

American Buddhist teacher

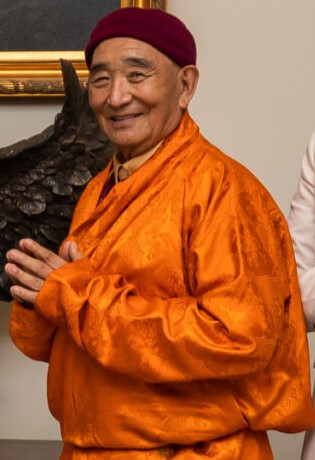
Tarthang Tulku Rinpoche at a Vesak celebration arranged by the White House Office in May 2021

Tarthang Tulku Rinpoche (Tibetan: དར་ཐང་སྤྲུལ་སྐུ་རིན་པོ་ཆེ, Wylie: Dar-thang Sprul-sku Rin-po-che) (born 1934) is a Tibetan Vajrayana teacher and lama who introduced the Nyingma school tradition of Tibetan Buddhism to the United States. Tarthang Tulku works to preserve the buddhadharma, the art and the culture of Tibet. He oversees various projects including Dharma Publishing, Yeshe-De, Tibetan Aid Project, the annual Nyingma school Monlam Chenmo World Peace Ceremony in Bodhgaya, and the construction of the Odiyan Copper Mountain Mandala. Tarthang Tulku also introduced Kum Nye to the West.

== Biography ==
As one of the last remaining lamas to have received a complete Buddhist education in pre-1959 Tibet, Tarthang Tulku left Tibet and taught in Benares, India, until emigrating to the United States of America in 1969 with his wife, the poet Nazli Nour. After settling in Berkeley, CA they established the Tibetan Aid Project (TAP) which serves the needs of the Tibetan refugee community.

In 1963, Tarthang Tulku founded Dharma Publishing in Varanasi, India. In 1971, the publishing house moved to California. The main purpose of Dharma Publishing is to preserve and distribute Tibetan Buddhist teachings and to bring these teachings to the West.

Tarthang Tulku established the Nyingma Institute in 1972. Sister organizations have been established in Brazil, Germany, the Netherlands, and the UK. The various institutes offer classes, workshops, and retreats based on the books of Tarthang Tulku, with the main intent of spreading the teachings of the Buddha to the West.

In 1983, Tarthang Tulku established the Yeshe De project, with the purpose of preserving and distributing sacred Tibetan texts in collaboration with the Tibetan Aid Project. These texts are distributed to Buddhist monks, nuns, and laypeople at the annual World Peace Ceremony, which Tarthang Tulku started in 1990 to bring the various Buddhist communities from across Asia to celebrate together at Bodh Gaya, in India. The World Peace Ceremony and the work of Yeshe De have and the Tibetan Aid Project have resulted in over 20 million texts being given away to practitioners in the Buddhist community over the last 18 years.

Tarthang Tulku has written over 40 books covering a wide variety of topics, including meditation, Kum Nye, Nyingma Buddhist psychology, skillful means (bringing Buddhist practices to the workplace), and the Time, Space, and Knowledge series.

Among Tarthang Tulku's current projects is the Mangalam Research Center for Buddhist Languages. Also, in the fall of 2012 he opened Dharma College, "committed to igniting personal and global transformation by helping people unlock the power of their minds."

Featured in a publication in the Leadership in Migration series, Rinpoche's story highlights how refugees can receive support from individuals of the host culture, and also contribute to their cultural life. Rinpoche's brought his cultural heritage to the host culture, and gathered a global cadre of volunteers to support the preservation of Buddhism.

== Publications ==
- Sacred Art of Tibet (1972)
- Calm and Clear: The Wheel of Analytic Meditation. Instructions on Vision in the Middle Way by Lama Mipham (1973)
- Reflections of Mind: Western Psychology Meets Tibetan Buddhism (Nyingma Psychology Series) (Editor) (1975)
- Gesture of Balance: A Guide to Self-Healing & Meditation (Nyingma Psychology Series)(1977)
- Time, Space & Knowledge: A New Vision of Reality (Time, Space, and Knowledge Series) (1977)
- Skillful Means: Patterns for Success (Nyingma Psychology Series) (1978)
- Skillful Means: Gentle Ways to Successful Work (1978)
- Kum Nye Relaxation Part 1: Theory, Preparation, Massage (Nyingma Psychology Series) (1978)
- Kum Nye Relaxation Part 2: Movement Exercises (1978)
- Dimensions of Thought (Editor) (1980)
- Hidden Mind of Freedom (Nyingma Psychology Series) (1981)
- Knowledge of Freedom: Time to Change (Nyingma Psychology Series) (1984)
- Ancient Tibet (1986)
- Love of Knowledge (Time, Space, and Knowledge Series) (1987)
- Knowledge of Time & Space: An Inquiry into Knowledge, Self & Reality (Time, Space and Knowledge Series) (1990)
- Openness Mind: Self-knowledge and Inner Peace through Meditation (Nyingma Psychology Series) (1990)
- Mandala Gardens (1991)
- Visions of Knowledge: Liberation of Modern Mind (Perspectives on Time, Space & Knowledge) (1993)
- Mastering Successful Work: Skillful Means: Wake Up! (1994)
- Dynamics of Time and Space: Transcending Limits on Knowledge (1994)
- Sacred Dimensions of Time & Space (Time, Space, and Knowledge) (1997)
- Teachings from the Heart (1998)
- Enlightenment Is a Choice: The Beauty of the Dharma (1998)
- Mind over Matter: Reflections on Buddhism in the West (2002)
- Tibetan Relaxation: Kum Nye Massage and Movement (2003)
- Milking the Painted Cow: The Creative Power of Mind & the Shape of Reality in Light of the Buddhist Tradition (2005)
- The Joy of Being: Advanced Kum Nye Practices for Relaxation, Integration and Concentration (2006)
- Tibetan Meditation: Practical teachings and step-by-step exercises on how to live in harmony, peace, and happiness (2006)
- Tibetan Relaxation: The Illustrated Guide to Kum Nye Massage and Movement - A Yoga from the Tibetan Tradition (2007)
- Kum Nye Tibetan Yoga: A Complete Guide to Health and Wellbeing, 115 Exercises & Massages (2007)
- A Garland of Flowers: Beauty of the Odiyan Mandala (2008)
- Seeing the Beauty of Being (2010)
- Kum Nye Dancing: Introducing the Mind to the Treasures the Body Offers (2012)
- Lotus Mandala: Sacred Garden (2012)
- Revelations of Mind (2013)
- Lotus Body (2016)
- Lotus Language (2016)
- Lotus Mind (2016)
- Love of Beauty: Copper Mountain Mandala of Odiyan (2016)
- Keys of Knowledge (2016)
- Dimensions of Mind (2016)
- Challenging Journey, Creative Journey (2017)
- Treasures of Dharma: Certainty of Knowledge, Perfect for Liberation (2017)
- Thoughts on Transmission: Knowingness Transforms Causal Conditions (2017)
- Caring (2018)
- Quotes (2018)
- Quotes 2 (2018)
- The Fourth of July: New Dimensions of Freedom (publication date unknown)
- Gesture of Great Love: Light of Liberation (2022)

== See also ==
- Tibetan American
