= Khandro Yeshé Réma =

Jétsunma Khandro Yeshé Réma, also known as Kyungchen Aro Lingma (1886–1923) was the discoverer of the Aro gTér terma, a cycle of pure vision revelation teachings. This is according to Aro gTér, which says Aro Lingma transmitted the lineage to her only son, named Aro Yeshe (1915-1951), a claim not supported by any other account, nor Aro Yeshe himself. She supposedly received these teachings in visions on a journey to Southern Tibet with her sang-yab (male consort) Khalden Lingpa, who had given up his monk's vows to become her sang-yab. These visions were visions of Yeshé Tsogyel in which Réma realized the cycles of teachings and practice that her mother had predicted she would. She also received the name Kyungchen Aro Lingma from Yeshé Tsogyel.

She was the tulku of Jomo Menmo. She lived in the Himalayas with her son Aro Yeshe and a community of practitioners that formed around them.

The Aro lineage (also called the Mother Essence lineage) is based on her teachings within the Nyingma tradition of Tibetan Buddhism.
