= Anthony Bourdain =

American chef and travel documentarian (1956–2018)

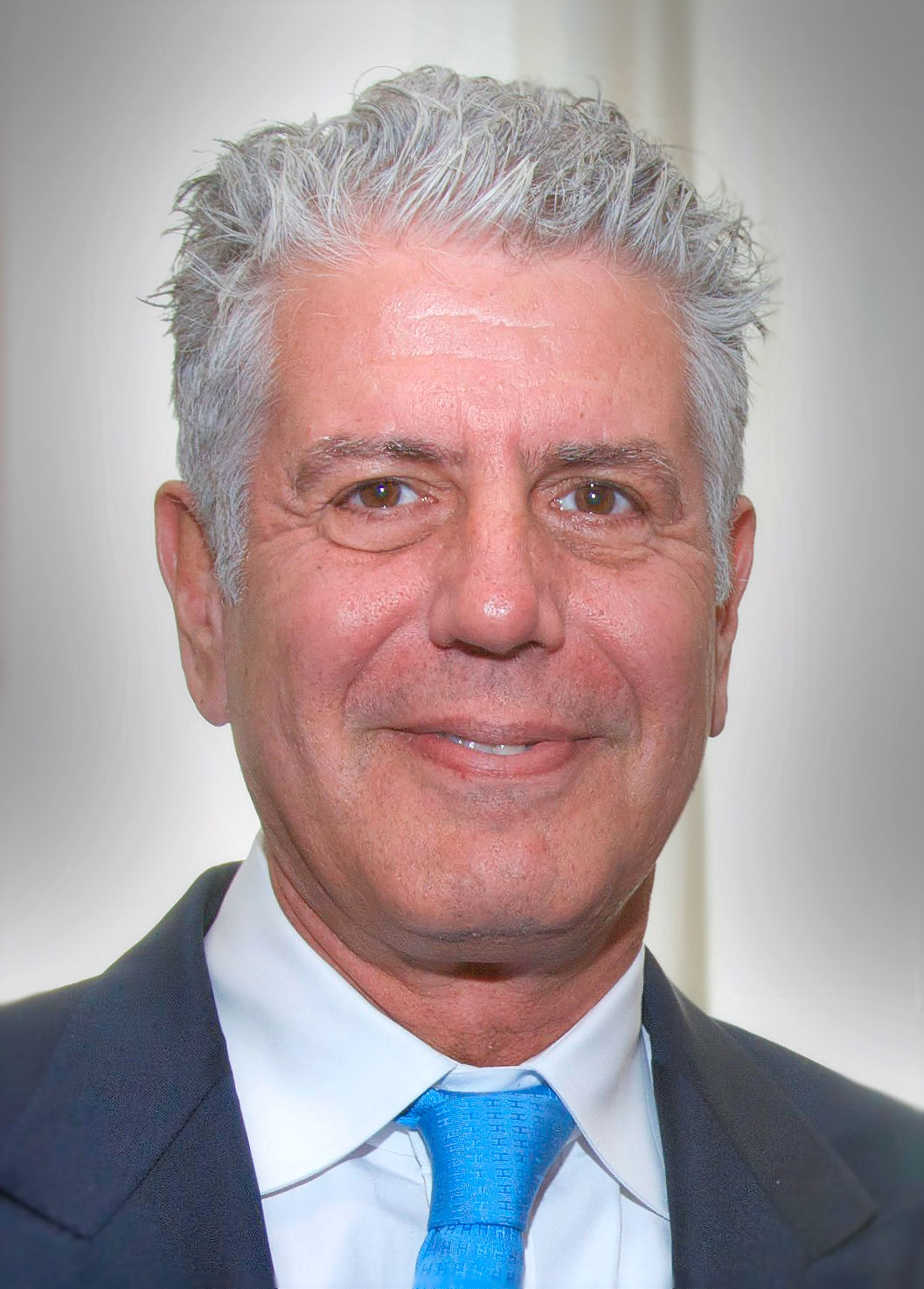
- Bourdain in 2014
- Born: Anthony Michael Bourdain; June 25, 1956; New York City, U.S.
- Died: June 8, 2018 (aged 61); Kaysersberg Vignoble, France
- Cause of death: Suicide by hanging
- Education: The Culinary Institute of America
- Occupations: Chef; author; journalist; travel writer; TV host
- Spouses: Nancy Putkoski (m. 1985; div. 2005); Ottavia Busia (m. 2007; sep. 2016)
- Partner: Asia Argento (2016–2018)
- Children: 1
- Culinary career
- Cooking style: French, eclectic
- Television shows
- A Cook's Tour; Anthony Bourdain: No Reservations; The Layover; The Taste; The Restaurant; Anthony Bourdain: Parts Unknown

Anthony Michael Bourdain (/bɔːrˈdeɪn/ bor-DAYN; June 25, 1956 – June 8, 2018) was an American celebrity chef, author, and travel documentarian. He starred in programs focusing on the exploration of international culture, cuisine, and the human condition.

Bourdain graduated from the Culinary Institute of America in 1978. He worked in many professional kitchens, including several years as an executive chef at Brasserie Les Halles in Manhattan. In the late 1990s, The New Yorker published an essay by Bourdain, kickstarting Bourdain's writing career and legitimizing the point-blank tone that became his trademark. The success was followed a year later by the New York Times best-selling book Kitchen Confidential: Adventures in the Culinary Underbelly (2000).

Bourdain's first food and world-travel television show, A Cook's Tour, ran for 35 episodes on the Food Network in 2002 and 2003. In 2005, he began hosting the Travel Channel's culinary and cultural adventure programs Anthony Bourdain: No Reservations (2005–2012) and The Layover (2011–2013). In 2013, he began a three-season run as a judge on The Taste and consequently switched his travelogue programming to CNN to host Anthony Bourdain: Parts Unknown. Bourdain also wrote fiction and historical nonfiction. On June 8, 2018, Bourdain hanged himself while filming Parts Unknown in France.

== Early life ==
Anthony Michael Bourdain was born in Manhattan on June 25, 1956. His father, Pierre, was a salesman at a New York City camera store and a floor manager at a record store, and later became a classical music recording industry executive at Columbia Records. His mother, Gladys (née Sacksman), was a staff editor at the New York Times. Anthony's brother, Christopher, was a few years younger than him.

Anthony grew up living with both of his parents and described his childhood in one of his books: "I did not want for love or attention. My parents loved me. Neither of them drank to excess. Nobody beat me. God was never mentioned so I was annoyed by neither church nor any notion of sin or damnation." His father was Catholic of French descent and his mother was Jewish. Bourdain stated that, although he was considered Jewish by halacha's definition, "I've never been in a synagogue. I don't believe in a higher power. But that doesn't make me any less Jewish, I don't think." His family was not religious.

Bourdain's paternal grandparents were French (his great-grandfather Aurélien Bourdain was born in Brazil to French parents) and his paternal grandfather Pierre Michel Bourdain emigrated from Arcachon to New York following World War I. Bourdain's father spent summers in France as a boy and grew up speaking French. Bourdain spent most of his childhood in Leonia, New Jersey. He felt jealous of the lack of parental supervision of his classmates and the freedom they had in their homes. In his youth, Bourdain was a member of the Boy Scouts of America.

== Culinary training and career ==
Bourdain's love of food was kindled in his youth while on a family vacation in France. He first experienced two "pre-epiphanies" with the first being the vichyssoise served cold on the voyage to France on the Queen Mary, and the second was the realization that French children were allowed to have a cigarette on Sunday and allowed to drink vin ordinaire at dinner. The vichyssoise was an eye-opener to him because he had previously only experienced hot soup made from condensed canned soups. He described it in Kitchen Confidential as the "first food I really noticed. It was the first food I enjoyed and, more important, remembered enjoying." Later in the trip, while staying with his aunt in La Teste de Buch, his family went out on an oyster fisherman's boat. Bourdain had never eaten a raw oyster before, but the fisherman offered him one which he had just harvested. Bourdain described the experience as "Everything was different now. Everything.... This, I knew was the magic I had until now been only dimly and spitefully aware of. I was hooked."

He graduated from the Dwight-Englewood School, an independent coeducational college-preparatory day school in Englewood, New Jersey, in 1973, then enrolled at Vassar College but dropped out after two years. He worked at seafood restaurants in Provincetown, Massachusetts, including the Lobster Pot, while attending Vassar, which inspired his decision to pursue cooking as a career.

Bourdain attended the Culinary Institute of America, graduating in 1978. From there he went on to run various restaurant kitchens in New York City, including the Supper Club, One Fifth Avenue and Sullivan's.

In 1998 Bourdain became an executive chef at Brasserie Les Halles. Based in Manhattan, at the time the brand had additional restaurants in Miami; Washington, D.C.; and Tokyo. Bourdain remained an executive chef there for many years and even when no longer formally employed at Les Halles, he maintained a relationship with the restaurant, which described him in January 2014 as their "chef at large". Les Halles closed in 2017 after filing for bankruptcy.

== Media career ==
=== Writing ===
In the mid-1980s Bourdain began submitting unsolicited work for publication to Between C & D, a literary magazine of the Lower East Side. The magazine eventually published a piece that Bourdain had written about a chef who was trying to purchase heroin on the Lower East Side. In 1985, Bourdain signed up for a writing workshop with Gordon Lish. In 1990, Bourdain received a small book advance from Random House, after meeting a Random House editor.

His first book, a culinary mystery called Bone in the Throat, was published in 1995. He paid for his own book tour, but he did not find success. His second mystery book, Gone Bamboo, also performed poorly in sales. Kitchen Confidential: Adventures in the Culinary Underbelly, a 2000 New York Times bestseller, was an expansion of his 1999 New Yorker article "Don't Eat Before Reading This".

In 2010 he published Medium Raw: A Bloody Valentine to the World of Food and the People Who Cook, a memoir and follow-up to the book Kitchen Confidential.

He wrote two more bestselling nonfiction books: A Cook's Tour: Global Adventures in Extreme Cuisines (2001), an account of his food and travel exploits around the world, written in conjunction with his first television series of the same title, and 2006's The Nasty Bits, a collection of 37 exotic, provocative, and humorous anecdotes and essays, many of them centered around food, and organized into sections named for each of the five traditional flavors, followed by a 30-page fiction piece ("A Chef's Christmas").

Bourdain later published a hypothetical historical investigation, Typhoid Mary: An Urban Historical, about Mary Mallon, an Irish-born cook believed to have infected 53 people with typhoid fever between 1907 and 1938. In 2007, Bourdain published No Reservations: Around the World on an Empty Stomach, covering the experiences of filming and photographs of the first three seasons of the show and his crew at work while filming the series.

His articles and essays appeared in many publications, including in The New Yorker, The New York Times, The Times, The Los Angeles Times, The Observer, Gourmet, Maxim, Esquire, Scotland on Sunday, The Face, Food Arts, Limb by Limb, BlackBook, The Independent, Best Life, the Financial Times, and Town & Country. His blog for the third season of Top Chef was nominated for a Webby Award for Best Blog (in the Cultural/Personal category) in 2008.

In 2012 Bourdain co-wrote the graphic novel Get Jiro! with Joel Rose and illustrations by Langdon Foss. It is set to receive an adult animated television series adaptation produced by Warner Bros. Animation and DC Studios, airing on Adult Swim in October 2026.

In 2015 Bourdain joined the travel, food, and politics publication Roads & Kingdoms, as the site's sole investor and editor-at-large. Over the next few years, Bourdain contributed to the site and edited the Dispatched By Bourdain series. Bourdain and Roads & Kingdoms also partnered on the digital series Explore Parts Unknown, which launched in 2017 and won a Primetime Emmy Award for Outstanding Short Form Nonfiction or Reality Series in 2018.

=== Television ===
Bourdain hosted many food and travel series, including his first show, A Cook's Tour (2002 to 2003). He worked for The Travel Channel from 2005 to 2013. He also worked for CNN from 2013 to 2018. Bourdain described the concept as, "I travel around the world, eat a lot of shit, and basically do whatever the fuck I want." His programs focused on the exploration of international culture, cuisine, and the human condition. Nigella Lawson noted that Bourdain had an "incredibly beautiful style when he talks that ranges from erudite to brilliantly slangy".

The acclaim surrounding Bourdain's memoir Kitchen Confidential led to an offer by the Food Network for him to host his own food and world-travel show, A Cook's Tour, which premiered in January 2002. It ran for 35 episodes, through 2003.

In July 2005 he premiered a new, somewhat similar television series, Anthony Bourdain: No Reservations, on the Travel Channel. As a further result of the immense popularity of Kitchen Confidential, the Fox sitcom Kitchen Confidential aired in 2005, in which the character Jack Bourdain is based loosely on Anthony Bourdain's biography and persona.

In July 2006 he and his crew were in Beirut filming an episode of No Reservations when the Israel–Lebanon conflict broke out unexpectedly after the crew had filmed only a few hours of footage. His producers compiled behind-the-scenes footage of him and his production staff, including not only their initial attempts to film the episode, but also their firsthand encounters with Hezbollah supporters, their days of waiting for news with other expatriates in a Beirut hotel, and their eventual escape aided by a fixer (unseen in the footage), whom Bourdain dubbed Mr. Wolf after Harvey Keitel's character in Pulp Fiction. Bourdain and his crew were finally evacuated with other American citizens, on the morning of July 20, by the United States Marine Corps. The Beirut No Reservations episode, which aired on August 21, 2006, was nominated for an Emmy Award in 2007.

In July 2011 the Travel Channel announced adding a second one-hour, 10-episode Bourdain show to be titled The Layover, which premiered November 21, 2011. Each episode featured an exploration of a city that can be undertaken within an air travel layover of 24 to 48 hours. The series ran for 20 episodes, through February 2013. Bourdain executive produced a similar show hosted by celebrities called The Getaway, which lasted two seasons on Esquire Network.

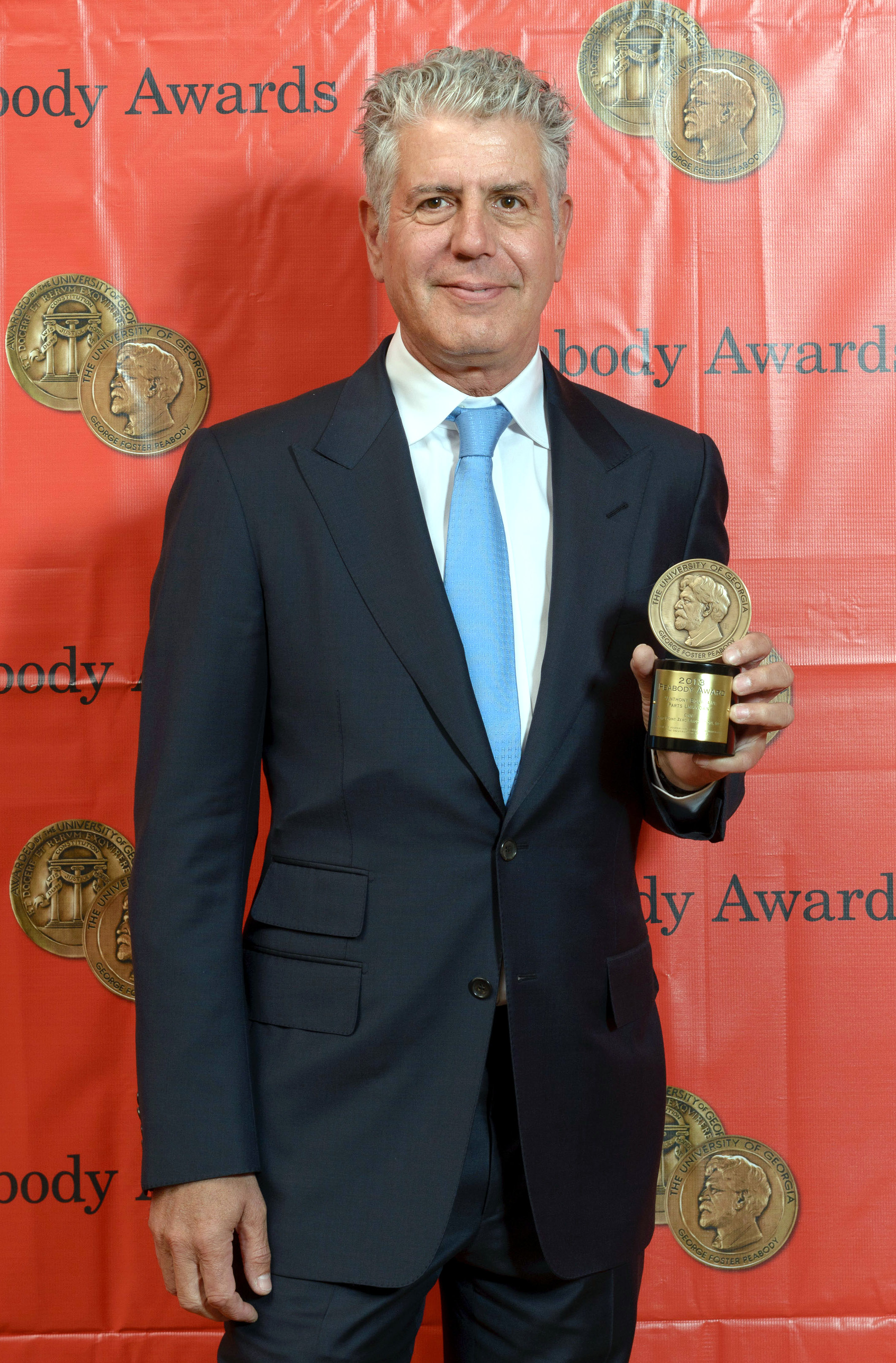
Bourdain with his Peabody Award in 2014

In May 2012 Bourdain announced that he was leaving the Travel Channel. In December, he explained on his blog that his departure was due to his frustration with the channel's new ownership using his voice and image to make it seem as if he were endorsing a car brand, and the channel's creating three "special episodes" consisting solely of clips from the seven official episodes of that season. He went on to host Anthony Bourdain: Parts Unknown for CNN. The program focused on other cuisines, cultures and politics and premiered on April 14, 2013.

President Barack Obama was featured on the program in an episode filmed in Vietnam that aired in September 2016; the two talked over a beer and bun cha at a small restaurant in Hanoi. The show was filmed and is set in places as diverse as Libya, Tokyo, the Punjab region, Jamaica, Turkey, Ethiopia, Nigeria, Far West Texas and Armenia.

Between 2012 and 2017 he served as narrator and executive producer for several episodes of the award-winning PBS series The Mind of a Chef; it aired on the last months of each year. The series moved from PBS to Facebook Watch in 2017.

From 2013 to 2015 Bourdain was an executive producer and appeared as a judge and mentor in ABC's cooking-competition show The Taste. He earned an Emmy nomination for each season.

Bourdain appeared five times as guest judge on Bravo's Top Chef reality cooking competition program. He was also one of the main judges on Top Chef All-Stars (Top Chef, Season 8). He made a guest appearance on the August 6, 2007, New York City episode of Bizarre Foods with Andrew Zimmern, and Zimmern himself appeared as a guest on the New York City episode of Bourdain's No Reservations airing the same day. On October 20, 2008, Bourdain hosted a special, At the Table with Anthony Bourdain, on the Travel Channel.

==== Other appearances ====
Bourdain was a consultant and writer for the television series Treme. In 2011 he voiced himself in a cameo on an episode of The Simpsons titled "The Food Wife", in which Marge, Lisa, and Bart start a food blog called The Three Mouthkateers. He appeared in a 2013 episode of the animated series Archer (S04E07), voicing chef Lance Casteau, a parody of himself. In 2015, he voiced a fictionalized version of himself on an episode of Sanjay and Craig titled "Snake Parts Unknown".

From 2015 to 2017 Bourdain hosted Raw Craft, a series of short videos released on YouTube. The series followed Bourdain as he visited various artisans who produce various craft items by hand, including iron skillets, suits, saxophones, and kitchen knives. The series was produced by William Grant & Sons to promote their Balvenie distillery's products.

=== Publishing ===
In September 2011 Ecco Press announced that Bourdain would have his own publishing line, Anthony Bourdain Books, which included acquiring between three and five titles per year that "reflect his remarkably eclectic tastes". The first books that the imprint published, released in 2013, include L.A. Son: My Life, My City, My Food by Roy Choi, Tien Nguyen, and Natasha Phan, Prophets of Smoked Meat by Daniel Vaughn, Pain Don't Hurt by Mark Miller, and Grand Forks: A History of American Dining in 128 Reviews by Marilyn Hagerty.

In describing the line, he said, "This will be a line of books for people with strong voices who are good at something—who speak with authority. Discern nothing from this initial list—other than a general affection for people who cook food and like food. The ability to kick people in the head is just as compelling to us—as long as that's coupled with an ability to vividly describe the experience. We are just as intent on crossing genres as we are enthusiastic about our first three authors. It only gets weirder from here." Shortly after Bourdain's death, HarperCollins announced that the publishing line would be shut down after the remaining works under contract were published.

=== Film ===
Bourdain appeared as himself in the 2015 film The Big Short, in which he used seafood stew as an analogy for a collateralized debt obligation. He also produced and starred in Wasted! The Story of Food Waste.

== Public image ==
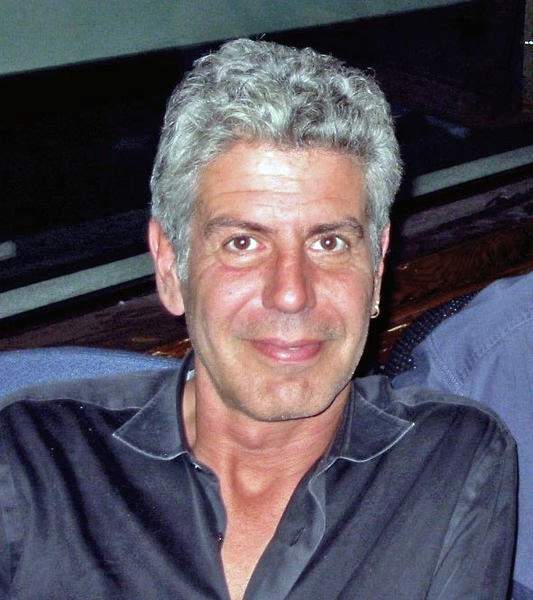
Bourdain in 2007

Drew Magary, in a column for GQ published on the day of Bourdain's death, opined that Bourdain was the spiritual successor to Hunter S. Thompson. Tributes declared Bourdain "the original rock star" of the culinary world, and his public persona that of a "culinary bad boy". Due to his liberal use of profanity and sexual references in his television show No Reservations, the network added viewer-discretion advisories to each episode.

Bourdain was known for consuming local specialty dishes his audiences found exotic, including black-colored blood sausages called mustamakkara (lit. 'black sausage') in Finland, sheep testicles in Morocco, ant eggs in Puebla, Mexico, a raw seal eyeball as part of a traditional Inuit seal hunt, and an entire cobra—beating heart, blood, bile, and meat—in Vietnam. Bourdain was quoted as saying that a Chicken McNugget was the most disgusting thing he ever ate, but he was fond of Popeyes and Jollibee chicken. He also declared that the unwashed warthog rectum he ate in Namibia was "the worst meal of [his] life", along with the fermented shark he ate in Iceland.

Bourdain was noted for his put-downs of celebrity chefs such as Paula Deen, Bobby Flay, Guy Fieri, Sandra Lee, and Rachael Ray, and appeared irritated by both the overt commercialism of the celebrity cooking industry and its lack of culinary authenticity. He voiced a "serious disdain for food demigods like Alan Richman, Alice Waters, and Alain Ducasse". Bourdain recognized the irony of his transformation into a celebrity chef and began to qualify his insults; in the 2007 New Orleans episode of No Reservations, he reconciled with Emeril Lagasse, whom he had previously disparaged in Kitchen Confidential. He later wrote more favorably of Lagasse in the preface of the 2013 edition. He was outspoken in his praise for chefs he admired, particularly Ferran Adrià, Juan Mari Arzak, Fergus Henderson, José Andrés, Thomas Keller, Martin Picard, Éric Ripert, and Marco Pierre White, as well as his former protégé and colleagues at Brasserie Les Halles. He spoke very highly of Julia Child, citing her as an influence.

Bourdain was known for his sarcastic comments about vegan and vegetarian activists, considering their lifestyle "rude" to the inhabitants of many countries he visited. He considered vegetarianism, except in the case of religious exemptions, a "First World luxury". However, he also believed that Americans eat too much meat, and admired vegetarians and vegans who put aside their beliefs when visiting different cultures as a sign of respect to their hosts.

Bourdain's book The Nasty Bits is dedicated to "Joey, Johnny, and Dee Dee" of the Ramones. He declared appreciation for their music, as well as that of other early punk bands such as Dead Boys and The Voidoids. He said that the playing of music by Billy Joel, Elton John, or Grateful Dead in his kitchen was grounds for firing. Joel was a fan of Bourdain's, and visited the restaurant. On No Reservations and Parts Unknown, he dined with and interviewed many musicians, both in the U.S. and elsewhere, with a special focus on glam and various rockers such as Alice Cooper, David Johansen, Marky Ramone, and Iggy Pop. He featured contemporary band Queens of the Stone Age on No Reservations several times, and they composed and performed the theme song for Parts Unknown.

== Personal life ==
In the 1970s, while attending high school at Dwight-Englewood School, Bourdain dated Nancy Putkoski. He described her as "a bad girl", older than he was and "part of a druggy crowd". She was a year ahead of him and Bourdain graduated one year early to follow Putkoski to Vassar College since they had just started admitting men. He studied there between the ages of 17 and 19. He then attended The Culinary Institute of America, a 15-minute drive from Vassar. The couple married in 1985 and remained together for two decades, divorcing in 2005.

On April 20, 2007, he married Ottavia Busia. The couple's daughter was born in 2007. Bourdain said having to be away from his family for 250 days a year working on his television shows put a strain on the relationship. Busia appeared in several episodes of No Reservations, notably the ones in Tuscany, Rome, Rio de Janeiro, Naples, and her birthplace of Sardinia. The couple separated in 2016.

Bourdain met Italian actress Asia Argento in 2016 while filming the Rome episode of Parts Unknown. In October 2017, Argento said in an article in The New Yorker that she had been sexually assaulted by Harvey Weinstein in the 1990s. After being criticized for her account in Italian media and politics, Argento moved to Germany to escape what she described as a culture of "victim blaming" in Italy. Argento delivered a speech on May 20, 2018, following the 2018 Cannes Film Festival, calling the festival Weinstein's "hunting ground" and alleging that she was raped by Weinstein in Cannes when she was 21. She added, "And even tonight, sitting among you, there are those who still have to be held accountable for their conduct against women." Bourdain supported her during that period. On June 3, 2018, Bourdain tweeted a video where the team was celebrating during the production of the show with Argento as director, him and Christopher Doyle. In August 2018, Argento said that Bourdain handled the payment of $380,000 to Jimmy Bennett, who had accused Argento of sexually assaulting him. She stated the payment by Bourdain was one he "personally undertook to help Bennett economically, upon the condition that we would no longer suffer any further intrusions in our life."

Bourdain practiced Brazilian jiu-jitsu, earning a blue belt in August 2015. He won gold at the IBJJF New York Spring International Open Championship in 2016, in the Middleweight Master 5 (age 51 and older) division.

Bourdain was known to be a heavy smoker. In a nod to Bourdain's two-pack-a-day cigarette habit, Thomas Keller once served him a 20-course tasting menu which included a mid-meal "coffee and cigarette", a coffee custard infused with tobacco with a foie gras mousse. Bourdain stopped smoking in 2007 for his daughter, but relapsed towards the end of his life.

Bourdain wrote in Kitchen Confidential of his experience in a SoHo restaurant in 1981, where he and his friends were often high. Bourdain said drugs influenced his decisions and that he would send a busboy to Alphabet City to obtain cannabis, methaqualone, cocaine, LSD, psilocybin mushrooms, secobarbital, tuinal, amphetamine, codeine and heroin.

== Death ==
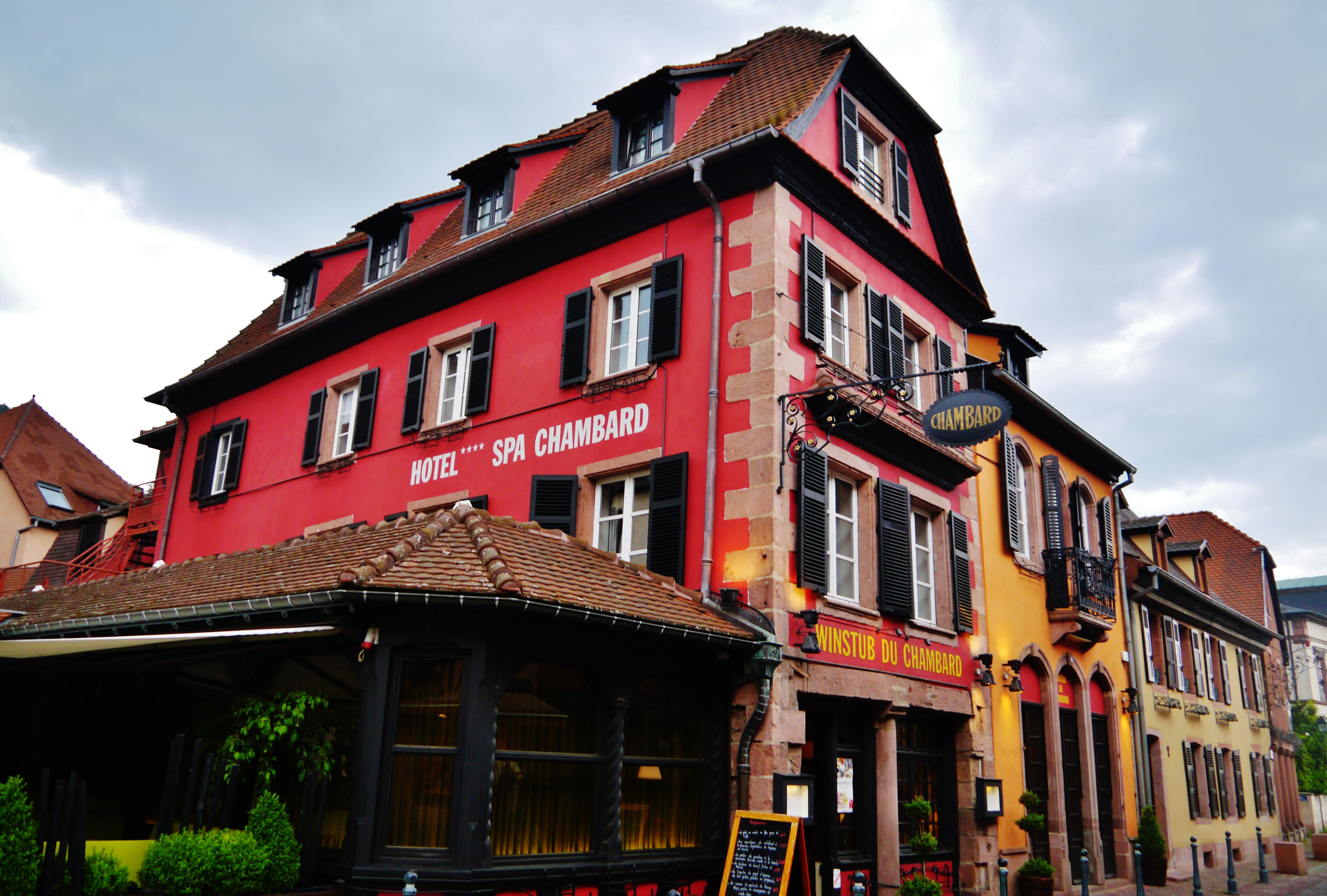
Hotel Chambard in Kaysersberg, Alsace, France (pictured in 2015), where Bourdain was found dead

In early June 2018, Bourdain was working on an episode of Parts Unknown in Strasbourg with his frequent collaborator and friend Éric Ripert. On June 8, 2018, Ripert became worried when Bourdain had missed dinner and breakfast. He subsequently found Bourdain dead of suicide by hanging in his room at Le Chambard hotel in Kaysersberg near Colmar. Texting records show that Bourdain had argued with Asia Argento in the days leading to his death, with Argento ending their relationship shortly before his suicide. Bourdain was 61 years old.

Bourdain's body bore no signs of violence, and his suicide appeared to be an impulsive act. Rocquigny du Fayel disclosed that Bourdain's toxicology results were negative for narcotics, showing only a trace of a therapeutic non-narcotic medication. Bourdain's body was cremated in France on June 13, 2018, and his ashes were returned to the United States two days later, before being given to his brother Christopher.

=== Reactions and tributes ===
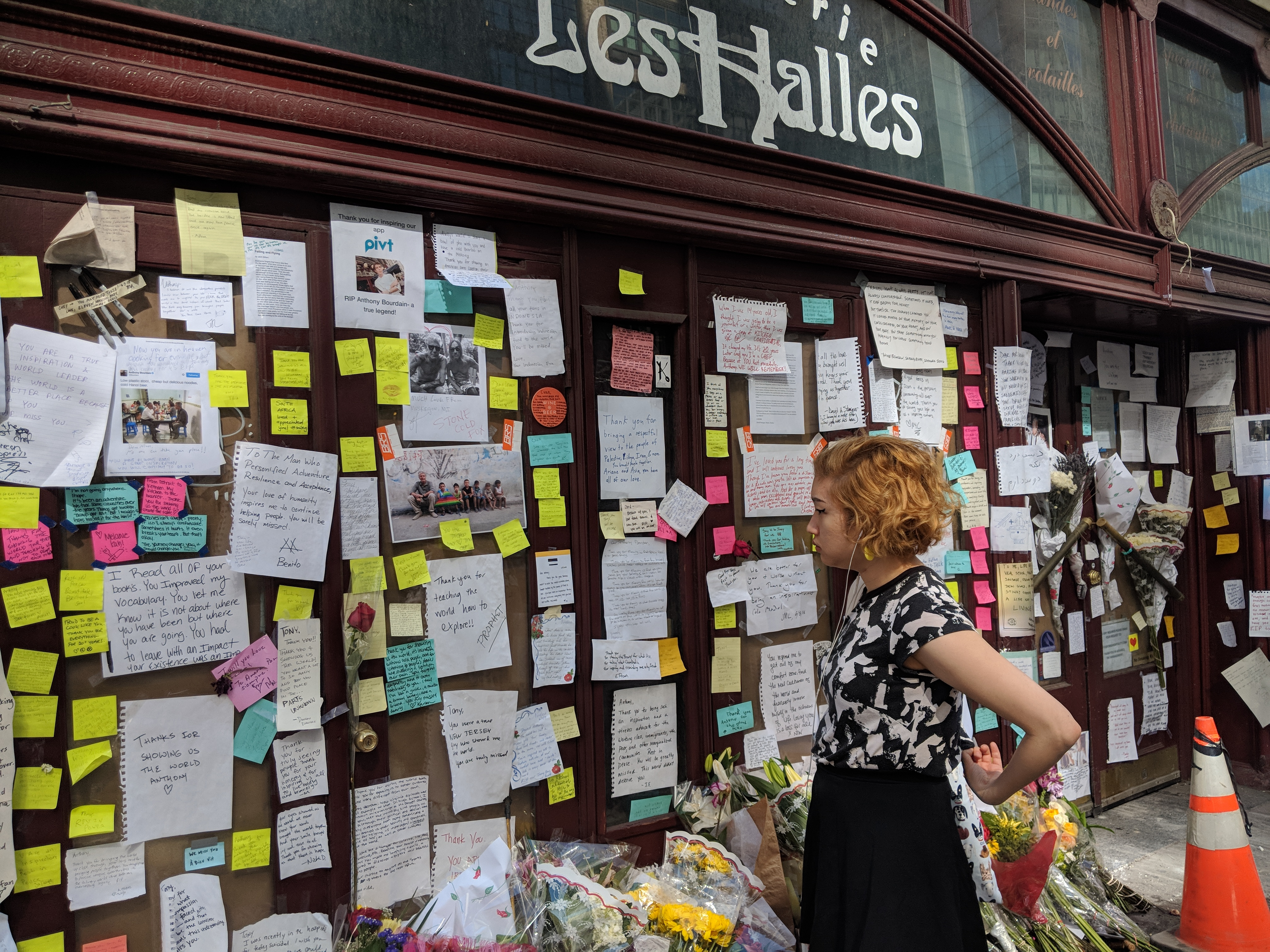
Memorial at Brasserie Les Halles

Bourdain's mother, Gladys Bourdain, told The New York Times, "He is absolutely the last person in the world I would have ever dreamed would do something like this. ... He had everything. Success beyond his wildest dreams. Money beyond his wildest dreams."

Following the news of Bourdain's death, various public figures expressed condolences. Among them were fellow chefs Andrew Zimmern and Gordon Ramsay, former astronaut Scott Kelly, and then-U.S. president Donald Trump. CNN issued a statement, saying that Bourdain's "talents never ceased to amaze us and we will miss him very much". Former U.S. president Barack Obama, who dined with Bourdain in Vietnam on Parts Unknown, wrote on Twitter: "He taught us about food—but more importantly, about its ability to bring us together. To make us a little less afraid of the unknown." On the day of Bourdain's death, CNN aired Remembering Anthony Bourdain, a tribute program.

In the days following Bourdain's death, fans gathered to pay tribute to him outside his former place of employment, Brasserie Les Halles (which had closed down the previous year). Cooks and restaurant owners held gatherings, tribute dinners, and memorials, and donated the net revenue from these events to the National Suicide Prevention Lifeline.

In August 2018 CNN announced a final, posthumous season of Parts Unknown. Its remaining episodes were completed using narration and additional interviews from featured guests with the season including two retrospective episodes paying tribute to the series and to Bourdain's legacy.

In June 2019 Éric Ripert and José Andrés proclaimed the first annual Bourdain Day as a tribute to Bourdain. That month, the Culinary Institute of America (CIA) established a scholarship in Bourdain's honor.

A collection of Bourdain's personal items were sold at auction in October 2019, raising $1.8 million, part of which went to support the Anthony Bourdain Legacy Scholarship at his alma mater, the Culinary Institute of America. The remainder went to his family. His custom-made Bob Kramer Steel and Meteorite Chef's Knife sold for the highest price, a record $231,250.

In June 2021 a documentary film directed by Morgan Neville and produced by CNN Films and HBO Max titled Roadrunner: A Film About Anthony Bourdain, had its world premiere at the Tribeca Film Festival. It was released by Focus Features on July 16, 2021.

In October 2022, Down and Out in Paradise: The Life of Anthony Bourdain, an unauthorized biography of Bourdain, was published.

In August 2024 a biographical film of Bourdain titled Tony was announced to be in the works with A24 in negotiations to acquire the film, with Matt Johnson directing and Dominic Sessa starring as Bourdain. The film was released in the U.S. on August 7, 2026.

In August 2026 Wayne State University Press announced the October 20, 2026 release of Todd Kennedy's Anthony Bourdain, Filmmaker, which argues Bourdain is best remembered as a filmmaker. Kennedy, a professor at Nicholls State University in Louisiana, previously made news in September 2018 when multiple news sources—including CNN, People, USA Today, the Associated Press, and Food & Wine magazine—ran stories about a college-level class Kennedy offered titled "Anthony Bourdain and His Influencers."

== Interests and advocacy ==
In an assessment of Bourdain's life for The Nation, David Klion wrote that, "Bourdain understood that the point of journalism is to tell the truth, to challenge the powerful, to expose wrongdoing. But his unique gift was to make doing all that look fun rather than grim or tedious." According to Klion, Bourdain's shows "made it possible to believe that social justice and earthly delights weren't mutually exclusive, and he pursued both with the same earnest reverence".

Bourdain advocated for communicating the value of traditional or peasant foods, including all of the varietal bits and unused animal parts not usually eaten by affluent 21st-century Americans. He also praised the quality of freshly prepared street food in other countries—especially developing countries—compared to fast-food chains in the U.S. Regarding Western moral criticism of cuisine in developing countries, Bourdain stated: "Let's call this criticism what it is: racism. There are a lot of practices from the developing world that I find personally repellent, from my privileged Western point of view. But I don't feel like I have such a moral high ground that I can walk around lecturing people in developing nations on how they should live their lives."

With regard to criticism of the Chinese, Bourdain stated: "The way in which people dismiss whole centuries-old cultures—often older than their own and usually non-white—with just utter contempt aggravates me. People who suggest I shouldn't go to a country like China, look at or film it, because some people eat dog there, I find that racist, frankly. Understand people first: their economic, living situation." Regarding the myth that monosodium glutamate in Chinese food is unhealthy, Bourdain said: "It's a lie. You know what causes Chinese restaurant syndrome? Racism. 'Ooh I have a headache; it must have been the Chinese guy.'"

In an acceptance speech for an award given by the Muslim Public Affairs Council, Bourdain stated, "The world has visited many terrible things on the Palestinian people, none more shameful than robbing them of their basic humanity." He opened the episode of Parts Unknown on Jerusalem with the prediction that "By the end of this hour, I'll be seen by many as a terrorist sympathizer, a Zionist tool, a self-hating Jew, an apologist for American imperialism, an Orientalist, socialist, a fascist, CIA Agent, and worse."

He championed industrious Spanish-speaking immigrants—from Mexico, Ecuador, and other Central and South American countries—who are cooks and chefs in many United States restaurants, including upscale establishments, regardless of cuisine. He considered them talented chefs and invaluable cooks, underpaid and unrecognized even though they have become the backbone of the U.S. restaurant industry.

In 2017 Bourdain became a vocal advocate against sexual harassment in the restaurant industry, speaking out about celebrity chefs Mario Batali and John Besh, and in Hollywood, particularly following his then-girlfriend Asia Argento's sexual abuse allegations against Harvey Weinstein. Bourdain accused Hollywood director Quentin Tarantino of "complicity" in the Weinstein sex scandal.

== Awards and nominations ==
- Anthony Bourdain was nominated Food Writer of the Year in 2001 by Bon Appétit magazine for Kitchen Confidential.
- A Cook's Tour: In Search of the Perfect Meal was named Food Book of the Year in 2002 by the British Guild of Food Writers.
- The Beirut episode of Anthony Bourdain: No Reservations, which documented the experiences of Bourdain and his crew during the 2006 Israel-Lebanon conflict, was nominated for an Emmy Award for Outstanding Informational Programming in 2007.
- Bourdain's blog for the reality competition show Top Chef was nominated for a Webby Award for best Blog – Culture/Personal in 2008.
- In 2008 Bourdain was inducted into the James Beard Foundation's Who's Who of Food and Beverage in America.
- In 2009 and 2011 Anthony Bourdain: No Reservations won a Creative Arts Emmy Award for Outstanding Cinematography for Nonfiction Programming.
- In 2010 Bourdain was nominated for a Creative Arts Emmy for Outstanding Writing for Nonfiction Programming.
- In 2012 Bourdain was awarded an Honorary Clio Award, which is given to individuals who are changing the world by encouraging people to think differently.
- In 2012 Anthony Bourdain: No Reservations won the Critics' Choice Best Reality Series award.
- In 2013, 2014, and 2015, Bourdain was nominated for the Primetime Emmy Award for Outstanding Host for a Reality or Reality-Competition Program for The Taste.
- Each year from 2013 to 2016 & 2018, Bourdain won the Emmy Award for Outstanding Informational Series or Special for Anthony Bourdain: Parts Unknown.
- In 2014, the 2013 season of Anthony Bourdain: Parts Unknown won a Peabody Award, which was accepted by Bourdain.
- In December 2017, the Culinary Institute of America (CIA) conferred the honorary degree of Doctor of Humane Letters in Culinary Arts honoris causa to Bourdain, who graduated from the CIA with an associate degree in 1978.
- Bourdain posthumously won a 2018 Primetime Emmy Award for Outstanding Short Form Nonfiction or Reality Series in partnership with Roads & Kingdoms.

== Books written ==
=== Nonfiction ===
- Kitchen Confidential: Adventures in the Culinary Underbelly. New York: Bloomsbury. 2000.
- A Cook's Tour: In Search of the Perfect Meal. New York: Bloomsbury. 2001.
- Typhoid Mary: An Urban Historical. New York: Bloomsbury. 2001.
- Anthony Bourdain's Les Halles Cookbook: Strategies, Recipes, and Techniques of Classic Bistro Cooking. Bloomsbury. 2004. ISBN 9781582341804.
- The Nasty Bits: Collected Varietal Cuts, Usable Trim, Scraps, and Bones. New York: Bloomsbury. 2006.
- No Reservations: Around the World on an Empty Stomach. New York: Bloomsbury. 2007.
- Medium Raw: A Bloody Valentine to the World of Food and the People Who Cook. Ecco/HarperCollins. 2010.
- Appetites: A Cookbook. Ecco Press. 2016.
- World Travel: An Irreverent Guide. Ecco. 2021. (with Laurie Woolever, posthumously published)
- "Hell's kitchen : getting through the day – and night – with a New York chef". Annals of Gastronomy. April 17, 2000. The New Yorker. 97 (27): 23–25. September 6, 2021.

=== Fiction ===
- — (1995). Bone in the Throat. New York: Villard Books. ISBN 978-0-679-43552-5.
- — (1997). Gone Bamboo. New York: Villard Books. ISBN 978-0-679-44880-8.
- — (2001). Bobby Gold. Edinburgh: Canongate Crime. ISBN 978-1-84195-145-4.
- —; with Joel Rose and Langdon Foss (2012). Get Jiro!. DC Comics. ISBN 9781401228279.
- —; with Joel Rose and Alé Garza (2015). Get Jiro: Blood and Sushi. DC Comics. ISBN 978-1401252267.
- —; with Joel Rose; Alberto Ponticelli; Irene Koh; and Paul Pope (2018). Hungry Ghosts. Berger Books. ISBN 978-1506706696.

== General and cited sources ==
- Bourdain, Anthony (2000). Kitchen Confidential: Adventures in the Culinary Underbelly. New York: Bloomsbury. ISBN 978-1-58234-082-1.
