= Kitchen Confidential (TV series) =

American television sitcom

- Genre: Sitcom
- Created by: David Hemingson
- Based on: Kitchen Confidential by Anthony Bourdain
- Starring: Bradley Cooper; Nicholas Brendon; John Francis Daley; Jaime King; Bonnie Somerville; Owain Yeoman
- Theme music composer: Mark Walk
- Composers: Daniel Licht; Mark Killian
- Country of origin: United States
- Original language: English
- No. of seasons: 1
- No. of episodes: 13

Production
- Executive producers: David Hemingson; Jim Rosenthal; Darren Star
- Camera setup: Single-camera
- Running time: 22 minutes
- Production companies: Hemingson Entertainment; Darren Star Productions; New Line Television; 20th Century Fox Television

Original release
- Network: Fox
- Release: September 19 – December 5, 2005

Kitchen Confidential is an American television sitcom that debuted on September 19, 2005, on the Fox network, based on Anthony Bourdain's New York Times best-selling book, Kitchen Confidential: Adventures in the Culinary Underbelly. Bradley Cooper played the lead character, Jack Bourdain, inspired by Anthony Bourdain.

After the show's first three episodes aired on Fox, the show was put on hiatus due to Fox's coverage of the Major League Baseball playoffs. In November 2005, Fox announced the show would not air during sweeps and that only 13 episodes would be produced because it was only averaging 4 million viewers. The show returned on December 5, 2005, with its fourth episode, but only received 3.38 million viewers. Four days later, Fox announced the cancellation of the series.

== Cast ==
The cast of Kitchen Confidential

=== Main ===
- Bradley Cooper as Jack Bourdain – executive chef. Once addicted to alcohol and drugs, he is given the opportunity to run Nolita and make a career comeback.
- Nicholas Brendon as Seth Richman – pastry chef. An old friend of Jack who has feelings for Tanya, the hostess. He also has a jealousy issue.
- John Francis Daley as Jim – commis chef. Begs Jack to stay at Nolita so he doesn't have to go back to Utah. Later, he develops feelings for Tanya.
- Jaime King as Tanya – hostess. The clueless and trusting hostess at Nolita.
- Bonnie Somerville as Mimi – head waitress. The daughter of Pino, who hates the staff and tries to fit in. She later becomes the owner of Nolita. Mimi attended the Cornell University School of Hotel Administration.
- Owain Yeoman as Steven Daedalus – sous chef. Jack's best friend, but also a thief and womanizer.

=== Recurring ===
- John Cho as Teddy Wong – seafood chef
- Frank Langella as Pino – Nolita's owner
- Sam Pancake as Cameron – waiter
- Tessie Santiago as Donna – waitress
- Erinn Hayes as Becky Sharp – chef
- Frank Alvarez as Ramon – dishwasher

== Episodes ==
No.	Title	Directed by	Written by	Original release date	Prod. code
1	"Exile on Main Street"	Darren Star	David Hemingson	September 19, 2005	1AKT79
Jack Bourdain (Bradley Cooper), a talented chef attempting a career comeback, calls on his old colleagues – pastry chef Seth Richman (Nicholas Brendon), poissonnier Teddy Wong (John Cho) and sous chef Steven Daedalus (Owain Yeoman) – when he's given just 48 hours to staff and open an upscale restaurant called Nolita.
2	"Aftermath"	Darren Star	David Hemingson	September 26, 2005	1AKT01
Jack hopes to rekindle an old flame (Lindsay Price), but he's too busy placating Pino (Frank Langella) and clashing with Steven over some shady dealings in the kitchen. Mimi (Bonnie Somerville), the head waitress, tries to start a competition in the dining hall among the waiters and waitresses, "The more you sell the more you earn", believing it will improve the service.
3	"Dinner Date with Death"	Michael Spiller	Joshua Sternin & Jennifer Ventimilia	October 3, 2005	1AKT02
Jack's former mentor Chef Gerard (John Larroquette), pays a visit to Nolita and asks for Jack to be killed with unhealthy food because he's already suffering from heart disease that will kill him. This leads to a bet among the staff of what type of food will eventually kill him. Rookie chef Jim (John Francis Daley) tries to figure out his position in the kitchen hierarchy, which brings to a collision with the dishwasher Ramon (Frank Alvarez).
4	"French Fight"	Henry Chan	Dan Sterling	December 5, 2005	1AKT09
When a rival French chef, Michel Valentine (Michael Vartan), steals a recipe from Jack's menu, Jack declares war and the two restaurants begin to sabotage each other, while Mimi finds herself sleeping with the enemy.
5	"You Lose, I Win"	Victoria Hochberg	Stacy Traub	Unaired	1AKT06
Jack hires Becky Sharp (Erinn Hayes), a former culinary school classmate, so he can spend more time outside the kitchen with guests. In the meantime, Teddy and Seth compete to see whose specialty is more popular.
6	"Rabbit Test"	Dennie Gordon	Joshua Sternin & Jennifer Ventimilia	Unaired	1AKT07
The kitchen routine is disrupted by a shipment of live rabbits and an outrageous bet. Jack woos an attractive vegan, Julia (Lauren Stamile), determined to make a meat-eater out of her.
7	"The Robbery"	Fred Savage	Lesley Wake Webster	Unaired	1AKT05
Business plummets in the wake of an armed robbery, driving Jack to desperate measures. Seth racks up a small fortune at the track. Jim wants Teddy to teach him how to make Fugu, a Japanese blow fish dish, in return for saving Teddy's life during the robbery.
8	"Teddy Takes Off"	Michael Spiller	Dan Sterling	Unaired	1AKT04
After Nolita is featured in Food & Wine magazine with Jack getting full credit for a seafood dish that Teddy created, this causes a rift between the two, ending with Teddy quitting to work somewhere else. Jack then hires a new poissonnier named Chet (Matt Winston), which leads Steven and Seth to try and oust his replacement and bring back their master seafood chef.
9	"Let's Do Brunch"	Victor Nelli, Jr.	Richard Appel	Unaired	1AKT08
As her tryst with Jack continues, Becky convinces him to start offering brunch at Nolita – to the staff's utter dismay. Becky's wish to do brunch at Nolita turns out to be for a different reason than what Jack thought from the beginning.
10	"Praise Be Praise"	Peter Lauer	Richard Appel	Unaired	1AKT03
Jack is distraught when his bedroom performance is given a lackluster online review by a woman he slept with (Jordana Spiro). Seth is equally distraught when none of the staff wants to sleep with him.
11	"An Affair to Remember"	Lev L. Spiro	Lesley Wake Webster	Unaired	1AKT10
While the guys in the kitchen conspire to help Jim lose his virginity, Jack is caught in a sticky situation when he unknowingly sleeps with Pino's mistress, Gia (Morena Baccarin).
12	"Power Play"	Matt Shakman	Stacy Traub	Unaired	1AKT11
As Nolita's new owner, Mimi quickly sets up a series of new rules that is not welcomed by the kitchen staff and Jack quickly tries to become her partner with the goal of running the restaurant his own way. Jim worries that his attraction to Tanya will hurt Seth's feelings, so he asks Jack for advice.
13	"And the Award Goes to..."	Lev L. Spiro	Karine Rosenthal & Dean Lopata	Unaired	1AKT12
Nolita is nominated for a prestigious award, which puts heavy pressure on both the kitchen and service staff as both are being judged. Jack is distracted by Becky's sudden reappearance, as the new restaurant she's working at is also nominated. She tries to sabotage Jack to win the award. Meanwhile, Jim's relationship with Tanya intensifies to Seth's great dismay.

== DVD release ==
On May 22, 2007, 20th Century Fox released Kitchen Confidential: The Complete Series on DVD in Region 1. The 2-disc set contains all 13 episodes of the series as well as audio commentaries on the series premiere by Darren Star, David Hemingson and Bradley Cooper, on the series finale by Karine Rosenthal, David Hemingson, Bradley Cooper and Dean Lopata and two featurettes – "A Tour of the Nolita Restaurant" and "A Recipe for Comedy".
