= Aro gTér =

Lineage within Tibetan Buddhism

- Formation: 1980s
- Founder: Ngakpa Chögyam
- Type: Tibetan Buddhism; Western Buddhism; Dzogchen
- Headquarters: Vale of Glamorgan, Wales, United Kingdom
- Website: arobuddhism.org

The Aro gTér is a lineage within the Nyingma school of Tibetan Buddhism. The pure vision terma on which it is based teaches all Buddhist topics from the point of view of Dzogchen. The Aro gTer terma was received by Western-born Buddhist, Ngakpa Chögyam. The lineage is a ngagpa or non-monastic lineage and emphasizes householder practice and non-celibate ordination. All of its contemporary teachers are ethnically non-Tibetan.

== History ==
Ngakpa Chögyam founded the Aro gTér organization in the 1980s. He was born in Hanover, Germany in 1952 and grew up in England. His father was English and his mother German; he is distantly related to the composer Franz Schubert. He studied Buddhism from the early 1970s through 1989, while working as a manual laborer, factory worker, and a truck driver in Britain to help pay for his education.

According to a terma which Ngakpa Chögyam received in visions, the Aro tradition has antecedents in a 'Mother Essence Lineage' of female tertöns originating with Yeshe Tsogyal, and forward to Kyungchen Aro Lingma (1886-1923). According to the Aro gTér, Kyunchen Aro Lingma first discovered the terma. This terton says Aro Lingma transmitted the lineage to her only son, named Aro Yeshe (1915-1951).

According to Gyaltsen Rinpoche, Dilgo Khyentse Rinpoche recognized Ngakpa Chögyam as Aro Yeshe's tulku, and Khordong gTerchen Tulku Chhi'med Rig'dzin Rinpoche recognized him as 'a-Shul Pema Legdeas', the incarnation of Aro Yeshe's predecessor.

In the 1970s, Ngakpa Chögyam studied with Chhi'med Rig'dzin Rinpoche, Dudjom Rinpoche, Dilgo Khyentse Rinpoche, Kunzang Dorje Rinpoche, and Khamtrül Yeshé Dorje Rinpoche. He wrote about his experiences in his 2011 book, Wisdom Eccentrics.

H.H. Dudjom Rinpoche gave the name Sang-ngak-chö-dzong to establish the western White Tantric Community organization, which is located in Britain.

== Teachings and practices ==
The principal practices are Vajrayana and Dzogchen, as well as "vajra romance" and Kum Nye.

== Sources ==
- Chhi’-mèd Rig’dzin Rinpoche, Khordong gTérchen Tulku (2003), "Foreword", in Chögyam, Ngakpa; Déchen, Khandro (eds.), Spectrum of Ecstasy: The Five Wisdom Emotions According to Vajrayana Buddhism, Shambhala Publications, ISBN 978-1-59030-061-9
- Chögyam, Ngakpa (1994), "The mother essence lineage", Gassho, 1 (5)
- Chögyam, Ngakpa (2011), Wisdom Eccentrics, Aro Books, Inc., ISBN 978-0965394864
- Chögyam, Ngakpa; Déchen, Khandro (2003), Spectrum of Ecstasy: The Five Wisdom Emotions According to Vajrayana Buddhism, Shambhala Publications, ISBN 978-1-59030-061-9
- Gyaltsen Rinpoche (1986), "Foreword", in Chögyam, Ngakpa (ed.), Rainbow of Liberated Energy: Working With Emotions Through the Colour and Element Symbolism of Tibetan Tantra, Element Books, ISBN 978-0906540923
- Rawlinson, Andrew (1997), The book of enlightened masters : Western teachers in Eastern traditions (first print ed.), Chicago, Ill. [u.a.]: Open Court, ISBN 978-0812693102
- Yeshe Dorje Rinpoche, Ngakchang (1991), "Foreword", in Chögyam, Ngakpa (ed.), Rainbow of Liberated Energy: Working With Emotions Through the Colour and Element Symbolism of Tibetan Tantra, Element Books, ISBN 978-0906540923
