= Le Bernardin =

Restaurant in New York City

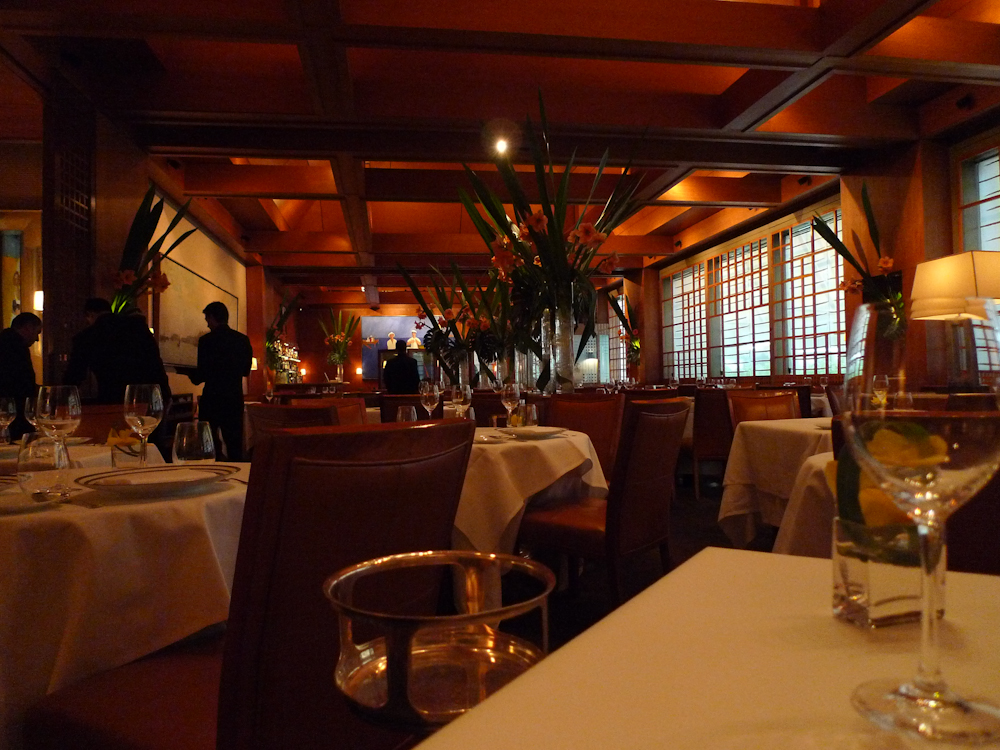
- Interior in 2009, prior to 2012 redesign
- Interactive map of Le Bernardin

Restaurant information
- Established: 1986; 40 years ago (New York location)
- Owners: Eric Ripert; Maguy Le Coze
- Previous owner: Gilbert Le Coze
- Head chef: Eric Ripert
- Food type: French cuisine, seafood
- Dress code: Business casual; jackets preferred
- Rating: (Michelin Guide)
- Location: 155 West 51st Street; Midtown Manhattan; New York, NY 10019; U.S.
- Coordinates: 40°45′41″N 73°58′54″W
- Other locations: Paris (until 1986)
- Website: le-bernardin.com

Le Bernardin is a three-Michelin star French seafood restaurant in Midtown Manhattan, New York City. Eric Ripert is the executive chef, and he is co-owner along with Maguy Le Coze.

== History ==
Gilbert Le Coze and his sister Maguy Le Coze opened the original Le Bernardin restaurant in Paris in 1972; the name came from a folk song their father sang to them as children, "Les Moines de St. Bernardin", about monks who "loved life – the good life especially".

The Le Coze siblings relocated the restaurant, under the same name, to New York City in 1986, not long after receiving a third Michelin star.

Eric Ripert joined the restaurant as chef de cuisine in 1991. When Gilbert Le Coze died of a heart attack in 1994, Ripert succeeded him as executive chef, and in 1996 he became co-owner of the restaurant with Maguy Le Coze.

In 2012 the restaurant was completely redesigned by the architectural firm Bentel & Bentel. A large lounge was also added.

== Menu and dining ==
Le Bernardin serves a four-course prix fixe dinner for $225 as well a 10-course chef’s tasting menu along with an optional wine pairings. A vegetarian tasting menu for $270, with six savory courses and two desserts, was added in 2017 which also has its own separate optional wine pairing. There is also a separate lounge menu serving à la carte options which consist of a small variety of tasting menu options such as their signature pounded tuna with foie gras and other delicacies such as caviar.

The restaurant also serves lunch consisting of two menus. The former in the main dining room consists of three courses and runs for $130 (outside of supplements) on weekdays only. There is also a lounge prix fixe in collaboration with City Harvest; a non-profit food rescue organization associated with the chef Eric Ripert. Said menu is priced at $94 for 3 courses including a $5 donation to said organization.

The restaurant specializes in fish and seafood, prepared in a variety of styles and sauces based fundamentally on French cuisine while also using various Asian ingredients and other modern and international flavors. The menu is divided into headings of "Almost raw", "Barely touched", and "Lightly cooked". Upon request, pasta, lamb, poultry, or filet mignon are served.

The dress code is business casual; jackets are recommended but not required.

For private gatherings, the restaurant has two options: Les Salons Bernardin, upstairs from the restaurant with its own entrance, with space for up to 80 guests; and Le Bernardin Privé, across the building's Galleria on the ground floor, which can seat up to 200.

The restaurant's lunch service is Monday through Friday, 12:00PM to 2:30 PM. The restaurant's dinner service is open at 5:00pm. Le Bernardin is closed on Sundays.

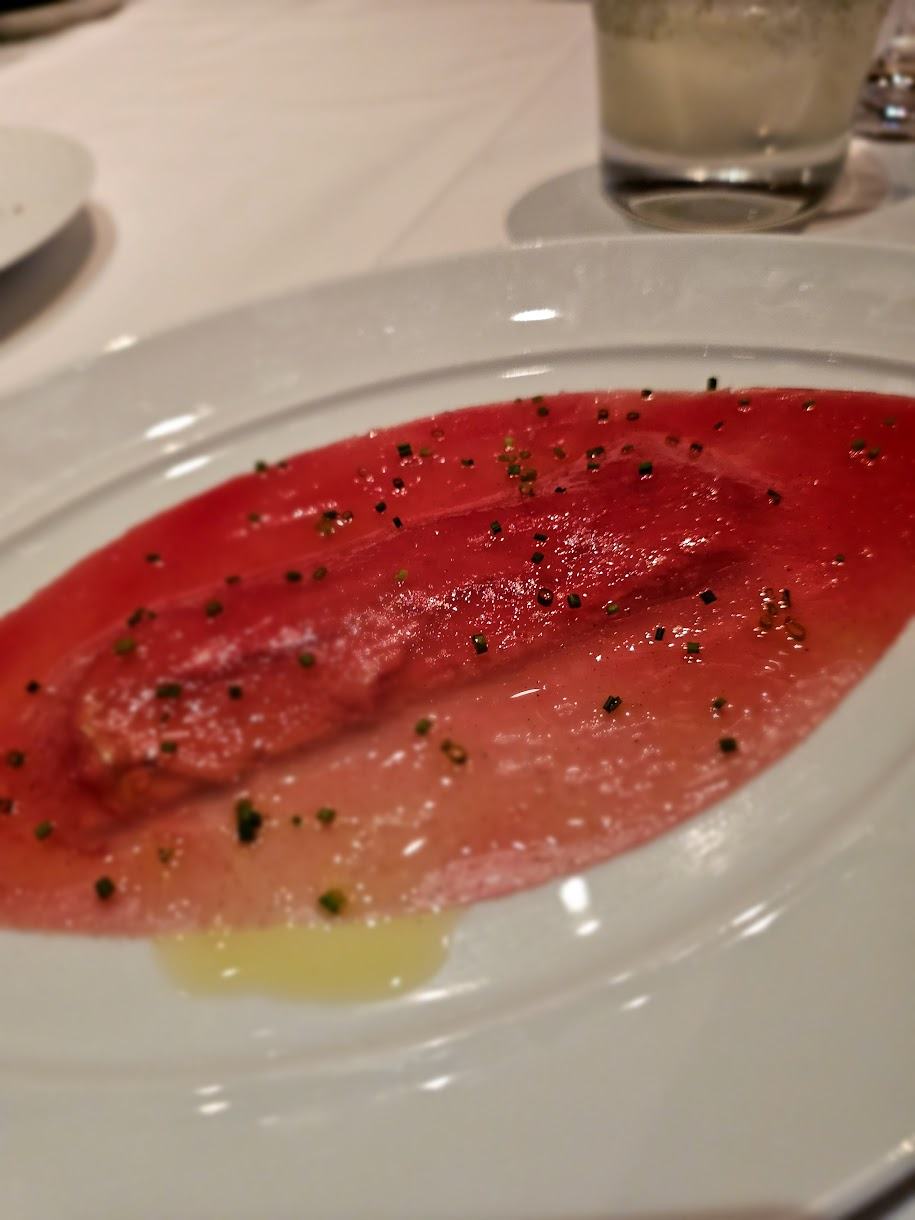
Signature dish from Le Bernardin - Layers of pounded tuna carpaccio, foie gras, toasted baguette, sliced chives, and extra virgin olive oil

== Awards and accolades ==
Le Bernardin has maintained a four-star rating from The New York Times since 1986. It is the only restaurant in New York that has kept a four-star New York Times rating for over 35 years.

It has won several James Beard Foundation Awards, including Outstanding Restaurant (1998); Best Chef – Eric Ripert (1998); Outstanding Pastry Chef – Michael Laiskonis (2007); and Outstanding Restaurateur – Maguy Le Coze (2013).

Le Bernardin received three Michelin stars in 2005, the first year that Michelin published a guide for New York City. It is one of five restaurants in New York with three Michelin stars.

In 2009, Le Bernardin ranked 15th in the world in The World's 50 Best Restaurants published by Restaurant magazine.

Zagat rates Le Bernardin among the best restaurants in New York. In Zagat's annual survey of restaurant patrons, Le Bernardin received the most votes of any restaurant in the city during the years 2009 to 2012. The ratings are published in a guide for the following year. In 2012, 44,306 restaurant patrons participated in the survey, and the ratings were summarized in the 2013 New York City Restaurants guide.

In 2016, Grub Street ranked it as No. 2 in "The Absolute Best Restaurant in New York"; the No. 1 spot went to Blue Hill at Stone Barns in Pocantico Hills, New York.

In 2017, Le Bernardin ranked second on La Liste, a privately published list of the top 1,000 restaurants in the world. In 2018, La Liste ranked Le Bernardin number one in the world.

Since 2022, Le Bernardin has maintained a No. 1 ranking on The Infatuation's "The 25 Best Restaurants in NYC" with a rating of 9.5 out of 10.

== Cookbooks ==
- Le Bernardin Cookbook: Four-Star Simplicity (1998)
- A Return to Cooking (2002)
- On the Line (2008)

== See also ==
- List of French restaurants
- List of seafood restaurants
- List of Michelin 3-star restaurants in the United States
- List of Michelin-starred restaurants in New York City
