= Gilbert Le Coze =

French chef

- Born: 1945; France
- Died: 28 July 1994 (aged 49); New York City
- Culinary career
- Cooking style: French, Japanese
- Rating: Michelin stars
- Current restaurants: Le Bernardin (Paris); Le Bernardin (New York City)

Gilbert Le Coze (1945 – 28 July 1994) was a French chef known for his innovative methods in seafood preparation. Le Coze's cooking has been compared to Japanese cuisine and has influenced a generation of American cooks.

In 1972 he left Brittany to open his own restaurant in Paris, Le Bernardin, with his sister Maguy Le Coze.

In 1986, the Equitable Life Assurance Company invited them to move the restaurant to the company's Manhattan headquarters. Le Coze worked with original Chef de Cuisine, Chef Eberhard Müller, and later, future head chef Éric Ripert. The restaurant gained two Michelin stars under Le Coze's management.

== Death ==
Le Coze died in Manhattan of a heart attack on 28 July 1994 while exercising at a health club.

== Nominations ==
- James Beard Award for Outstanding Restaurant
- James Beard Award for Best Chef: New York City
