= Jean-Michel Diot =

French chef and restaurateur

Jean Michel Diot
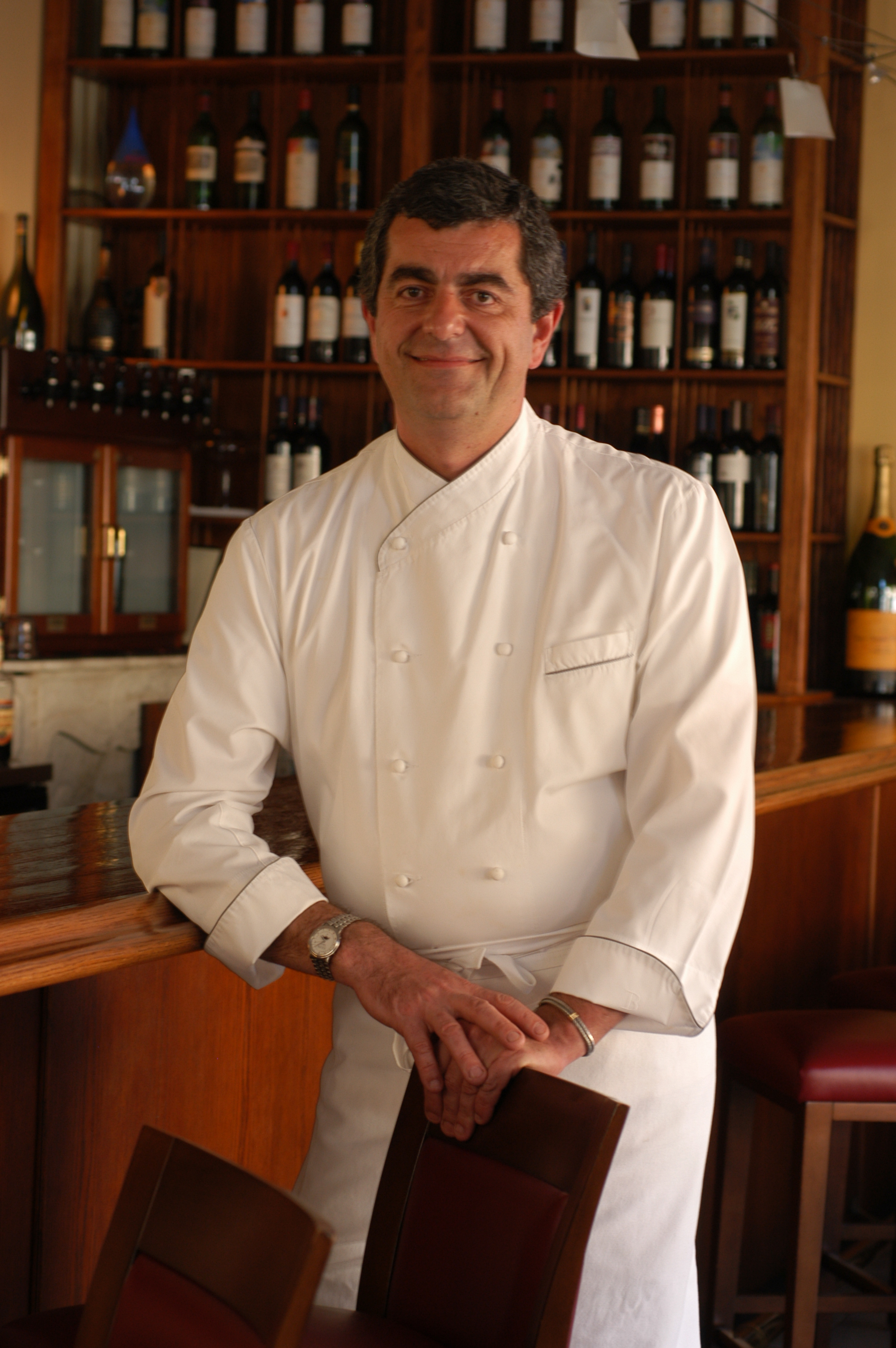
- Born: Cusset, France
- Occupations: Chef and Restaurateur
- Style: French Cuisine
- Website: www.bistrodumarche.net

Jean-Michel Diot (born May 2, 1959, in Cusset, France) is a French chef and restaurateur at Tapenade Restaurant. Chef Diot has been Best Chef in America and America's Finest Restaurant while holding his first French bistro creation in America, Park Bistro, and has received the Exemplary Achievement in the Culinary Art by Gault Millau.

Diot began his career in Vienne (France) in 1975 moving to New York City in 1987. He has owned and operated several restaurants located in New York ranging from New York Times 3-star rated "Park Bistro" to a tribute to Paris with New York Times 2 star "Les Halles" as per House and Garden, Diot became New York's "Baron of Bistros". In San Diego, he continued his career and opened Tapenade Restaurant in 1998. Tapenade Restaurant has received multiple awards such as best French Restaurant in San Diego in various publications such San Diego Magazine, San Diego Home & Garden, La Jolla Light, and one of the highest recognitions in San Diego by the Zagat Survey.

== Early culinary background ==
In 1978, Jean-Michel Diot began a two-year apprenticeship in Lyon at the Restaurant Magnard while still in school. He received his diploma in classical cooking. Jean-Michel continued his culinary career through travelling across France and adopted different regional cooking styles. For over a year, he worked at La Pyramide, a 3-star Michelin restaurant led by Fernand Point. While at La Pyramide, Diot was the Commis de Cuisine. He continued his tour to "Jacqueline Fenix Restaurant" in Neuilly, followed by a year at Les Prés d'Eugenie, where under Chef Michel Guérard, known as "the father of Nouvelle Cuisine," he experienced the complexity of Guérard's cooking philosophy.

In 1983, Diot took a Sous-Chef position at Jacques Chibois's "Le Royal Gray" in Cannes, a 2-star rated Michelin restaurant where he stayed four years and became Chef. He also took the position of Executive Chef at Le Chateau d'Esclimont near Paris, the Larochefoucault residence, a 16th-century jewel, 2 toques Gault Millau.

== Career in New York ==
In 1987, he opened Maxim's de Paris, as a part of the Peninsula Hotel in New York. While at Maxim's de Paris, Diot served as the Executive Chef. As Executive Chef, Diot took charge of the hotel, two restaurants, and a banquet facility.

In January 1989, Diot opened his first owned restaurant, Park Bistro that won 3-stars from the New York Times. The same year, he opened Park Avenue Catering, a bakery and pastry shop. In 1990, he opened Brasserie Les Halles, a French butcher shop and restaurant that won 2-stars from the New York Times In 1992, he opened Brasserie des Theatres with Max Bernard and Philippe Lajaunie that won two stars in the New York Times.

While operating these restaurants, Diot also served as a chef for dinners such as the Sister Town Cannes-Beverly Hills, the Cancer Foundation dinner organized by the Martell Foundation, and served as the official and exclusive caterer for the Museum of Television in New York. Diot also catered dinners in honor of Henry Kissinger, and for Pierre Franey's 70th birthday. He also participated in the Master Food and Wine Week in Carmel, as well as "Share Strength" since 1990.

== Career in La Jolla ==
In 1998, Diot opened Tapenade Restaurant. The restaurant, located in La Jolla California, was recognized as one of the finest French restaurants in San Diego. Tapenade has received the honors of Best French in San Diego by: San Diego Magazine, Zagat Survey, La Jolla Light, San Diego Home & Garden, La Jolla Village News, and more. Tapenade closed in May 2015.

In October 2015, Diot opened the successor to Tapenade Restaurant, called "Bistro du Marché." Named after La Jolla's popular open air market, Bistro du Marché is also based on the culinary concept of "bistronomie", a form of French cuisine. The youthfulness of the bistronomie movement has succeeded in reinvigorating French cuisine, and Bistro du Marché, which is now part of the wave called "gastro-bistro," which raises the bar of a traditional French bistro's.

Bistro du Marché is located in the heart of La Jolla, where the Open Aire Farmers Market is held every Sunday. Bistro du Marché allows chef Diot to work closely with farmers to incorporate the finest local flavors for the restaurant.

== Awards ==
Shortly after opening Park Bistro and Park Avenue Catering, Jean Michel was awarded the Grand Master Chef of America and America's Outstanding Chef. A year afterwards, Jean-Michel's Park Bistro received a 3-star review from the New York Times. Two years after opening Park Bistro and Park Avenue Catering, Diot was given the Great Chefs of New York award as well as the Gault Millau Best of New York. In 1992, he was Nominated Best Chef in America by the James Beard Foundation. Diot was the winner of three first prizes at the American Cheese Contest in Wisconsin.

Tapenade Restaurant in San Diego became an instant hit. Currently, Tapenade is recognized as one of the finest French restaurants in San Diego. Tapenade has received countless "Best French Restaurant" and "Best of the Best" awards in San Diego from La Jolla Village News, San Diego Home and Garden, La Jolla Light, and San Diego Magazine. Tapenade has received the Finest in America from Zagat Survey. The Award of Excellence from Wine Spectators has also been received for eight years. In 2013, Zagat Survey awarded a food rating of 28.

== Other Culinary Activities ==
Diot has taught cooking classes at Macy's and Bloomingdales, and participated in the cookbook, French Cooking for the Home, by Arlene Feltman-Sailhac. Diot has appeared on television shows on the National Food Channel Network. In these shows, Diot has worked closely with chefs including Pierre Franey and Robin Leach. For the last two years, Chef Diot has teamed up with La Jolla's Harvard Cookin' Girl School to raise awareness of the Food 4 Kids Backpack Program through the San Diego Food Bank.
