= San Diego Magazine =

American monthly magazine

- Categories: General interest
- Frequency: Monthly
- Publisher: San Diego Magazine
- Paid circulation: 48,795
- Founded: 1948
- Country: United States
- Based in: San Diego
- Language: English
- Website: http://www.sandiegomagazine.com

San Diego Magazine is a multi-platform media company covering food, arts and culture, travel, health and wellness, social progress, and life in San Diego County, California. Its flagship monthly magazine has won multiple regional and national awards. The media company also produces podcasts, large-scale events, custom publications, e-newsletters, and short- and long-form video. It is a member of the City and Regional Magazine Association (CRMA).

In October 2021, the media company was acquired by writer and Food Network host, Troy Johnson, and his wife Claire, former director of business operations at NBC Universal.

== History ==
San Diego Magazine was established by Edwin Self in 1948. The publishers were Edwin and Gloria Self, who also served as joint editors until they sold the title to Jim Fitzpatrick, former publisher of Entrepreneur, in 1994. It was acquired by CurtCo Media in 2005, who sold it to Desert Publications in 2010. Jim Fitzpatrick then became CEO and Publisher again. The magazine closed in 2020 for a short period of time due to Covid-19, then relaunched under new ownership of award-winning food writer, podcast host, and TV personality Troy Johnson, and his wife, Claire.

Some of the media company's most notable annual features and events include "Best of San Diego", "Best Restaurants", "Top Doctors", and "Celebrating Women".

In 2017, its "Happy Half Hour" food podcast won a national Folio award for "Best Consumer/City Regional Podcast." Their expose about fraud in the farm-to-table movement was included in "Food Matters," a college textbook of outstanding food writing from Macmillan Learning.
