= Medium Raw (book) =

2010 memoir by Anthony Bourdain

- Author: Anthony Bourdain
- Language: English
- Genre: Memoir
- Publisher: Ecco
- Publication date: June 8, 2010
- Publication place: United States
- Media type: Print (Hardback)
- Pages: 304
- ISBN: 0-06-171894-7
- Preceded by: No Reservations: Around the World on an Empty Stomach

Medium Raw: A Bloody Valentine to the World of Food and the People Who Cook is a memoir by Anthony Bourdain and the follow-up to Bourdain's bestselling Kitchen Confidential. Medium Raw addresses Bourdain's rise to stardom following the success of Kitchen Confidential. No longer a cook and now finding himself a television personality, Bourdain gives his opinion on many of his fellow television chefs (most of whom, he argues, are not chefs at all due to never having worked in a restaurant) and how the restaurant industry has changed in the ten years since Kitchen Confidential was published.

== Critical reception ==
From Doug French:

[Bourdain] writes like he talks, except the writing is peppered with the F-word and similar technical terms presumably used in commercial kitchens. The pages flow in a stream-of-consciousness way that gives one the impression that the author is almost forced to purge these thoughts from his head to the page so he can manically move on to more adventure, which is what he seems to make a living doing on the Travel Channel.

From Geoff Nicholson of San Francisco Chronicle:

His new book, "Medium Raw," is subtitled "A Bloody Valentine to the World of Food and the People Who Cook," and much of it reads more like a poison-pen letter than a love note ... But just in case you're wondering whether Bourdain can take it as well as he can dish it out, he turns his verbal knife skills on himself. "A loud, egotistical, one-note -hole who's been cruising on the reputation of one obnoxious, over-testosteroned book for way too long," "the angry, cynical, snarky guy who says mean things on 'Top Chef,' " "the very picture of the jaded, overprivileged 'foodie.' " Well, he makes some good points.

Samantha Nelson of The A.V. Club gave the book a C−:

Ten years ago, Bourdain was a proud member of a strange, somewhat criminal outcast culture, and he produced a work that really didn't need a follow-up. In the interim, he's become a cultural icon, but his new book feels redundant, out of touch, and more than a little sad.

Josh Ozersky of Time Magazine enjoyed the book:

There is no more honest man in the media than Tony Bourdain. And that makes all the difference between him and the food-media complex that he helped create ... In the present, he is angry at the abuse of food and cooking by TV food stars, those stars' frauds and follies and himself for being part of the circus. He's still mad; that's where his energy and eloquence come from. It's the best part of who he is. Happily, that anger is still white and pure after all these years; it burns away all the impurities of the food-media fog that is now his habitat.
