= Tibetan Aid Project =

Tibetan Nyingma Relief Foundation

The Tibetan Aid Project (TAP) is an operation of the Tibetan Nyingma Relief Foundation. TAP was founded in 1969 by Tarthang Tulku—a leading Tibetan master and teacher—to support the efforts of Tibetans to survive in exile and re-establish their cultural heritage. It is a 501 c (3) non-profit organization that primarily focuses on raising funds for the production, shipment and distribution of sacred texts, art and prayer wheels for the World Peace Ceremony in Bodh Gaya, India.

During the Chinese invasion of 1959, more than 1 million Tibetans were killed and 6,237 monasteries were destroyed along with their libraries. Over the years, TAP has filled hundreds of libraries with Tibetan books, stimulated education in the Himalayan region, fostered literacy across Tibetan society, improved the economy of Bodh Gaya, India, and enabled nuns—who were traditionally limited to non-scholastic activities—to study texts and earn advanced degrees.

== Monastic importance in Tibet ==
The monastic tradition was and still is uniquely strong for Tibetans. In 1951, monasteries had access to and occupied between 37 and 50 percent of the best, most fertile land in Tibet. In addition, the government strongly supported the monasteries, providing money for prayer ceremonies and other religious activities. In the three largest monasteries around Lhasa, there alone were twenty thousand monks. Before the Chinese takeover, between 10 and 20 percent of males in Tibet were monks. This is a much higher percentage compared to other Buddhist countries. In Thailand, for example, only 1-2 percent of its males were monks in the mid-1900s. According to Melvyn C. Goldstein, the large number of monasteries was a result from the Tibetans' belief that "Tibet's greatness lay in its development of a system wherein tens of thousands of young boys were constantly being taken away from the mundane world of inevitable suffering and thrust into a purer alternative culture—the organized community of celibate monks."

When China invaded Tibet in 1959, thousands of these monasteries were destroyed along with their libraries, marking the beginning of a precarious time for Tibetans and their culture.

== The founder of TAP ==
In 1959, with around 100,000 of his followers, the Dalai Lama fled from Chinese persecution. Prior to that Tarthang (Tar-tung) Tulku, a Tibetan lama, had traveled to study in Sikkim, India with his primary teacher, Khentse Rinpoche.

Later settling in India on a scholastic fellowship, Tarthang Rinpoche spent six years teaching Buddhist philosophy at Sanskrit University in Benares, India. He also began a small Tibetan-language publishing company. After years of witnessing the decline of his culture and the living conditions of his fellow refugees, Tarthang traveled to California in 1968. In Berkeley—where there was already a flourishing array of East-meets-West, his desire to help the Tibetans and all humanity had a place to grow. Later, he would establish Dharma Publishing and the Tibetan Aid Project.

== The books ==
When Buddhism came to Tibet from India in the 7th century, the religion thrived and a steady flow of the Buddha's teachings were translated from Sanskrit to Tibetan. These texts were canonized as the Kanjur and the Tanjur. The Kanjur is the sacred teachings of the Buddha and the Tanjur, a large collection of commentary on the teachings.

With the desire to publish these Tibetan texts, Tarthang searched everywhere for the Kanjur and the Tanjur. However, there were very few copies to be found. Empty-handed, Tarthang spread the word to the Tibetan refugees, some of whom had carried books instead of food with them during the mass exodus of 1959. Many Tibetan refugees responded to Tarthang's search, and as a result, in 1982 Dharma Publishing was able to put together a complete canonical collection of the texts based on the Derge Edition and other editions, including nine texts from the Chinese Canon. Containing 5,109 texts and totaling 65,160 pages, the Canon also includes traditional Tibetan art and is the most complete collection of the Kanjur and Tanjur ever assembled.

Besides the Kanjur and the Tanjur, Tarthang oversaw the production of other sacred Tibetan texts written by numerous great teachers and philosophers, such as Dudjom Rinpoche, Jigme Lingpa and Patrul Rinpoche, to name a few.

== World Peace Ceremony ==
In 1989, Tarthang organized an annual ceremony in order to pray for world peace at Bodh Gaya in Bihar, India—the site of Buddha's enlightenment. The Ceremony takes place in January and lasts for 10 days. During the World Peace Ceremony, the Tibetan Aid Project distributes thousands of books to Tibetans. Over the span of 22 years, TAP has helped give away more than three million books and sacred art prints and over 140,000 prayer wheels, preserving the Tibetan teachings of wisdom and compassion for generations to come.

== Taste & Tribute San Francisco: a benefit dinner gala ==
In 2001, Chef Laurent Manrique proposed to the Tibetan Aid Project of doing a charity dinner to which he would invite some of his other chef friends to join in. Over the years, it has grown into the main fundraiser for the Tibetan Aid Project. During the event, more than 20 of the Bay Area's best chefs work in pairs to prepare exquisite meals for 220 guests at the Four Seasons Hotel in San Francisco.

== Sister sites and organizations ==
In addition to the Tibetan Aid Project, Tarthang established several other organizations.

- The Nyingma Institute was founded in 1972. It offers lectures, classes and retreats on Buddhist studies, meditation, yoga, Nyingma psychology and other classes. Since its beginning, over 150,000 students have attended the Nyingma Institute in Berkeley, California.
- The Dharma Publishing Company was moved to the United States from India. It began its operations in 1971 with the goal to preserve Tibetan culture by keeping important books in print. Every year, Dharma Publishing publishes and distributes thousands of Tibetan texts around the world. It also publishes books by Tarthang Tulku, such as Time, Space and Knowledge, Gesture of Balance, and Skillful Means.
- The Mangalam Research Center for Buddhist Languages, founded in 2008, is the center where scholars come to study Buddhism, its written tradition, and its sacred texts. In its library, it holds a large collection of Tibetan texts.
- Dharma College will eventually offer noontime and evening lectures for the community in addition to college and graduate-level classes for students of Tibetan Buddhism.
- The Yeshe De Text Program or the Tibetan Book Project preserves Tibetan texts for distribution.
- The Guna Foundation began in 2009 to preserve archival pictures and footage of Tarthang Tulku and his organizations. The foundation currently finished the documentary Light of the Valley, which is about the 15th renovation of the Swayambhu Stupa in Kathmandu, Nepal. The foundation also funds Yak Liberation, a group that releases yaks back into the wild.
- The Light of Buddhadharma Foundation raises funds to preserve and restore shrines and cultural artifacts in India, pay for religious ceremonies at holy places in India and buy robes for monks.
- Odiyan Retreat Center, located on 1,000 acres of land in a remote part of Northwestern Sonoma County, this retreat center was founded in 1975. At Odiyan, scholars and practitioners can immerse themselves in meditation and Nyingma training.
- The Ratna Ling Retreat Center began in 2004 near Cazadero, California. Dharma Press was relocated to Ratna Ling shortly after the acquisition. Ratna Ling is a retreat, education and spiritual center geared towards operating the presses by uncompensated retreatants.
