= Maguy Le Coze =

French restaurateur (born 1944)

- Born: 1944 (age 80–81); Brittany, France
- Occupation: Restaurateur
- Website: https://www.le-bernardin.com

Maguy Le Coze (born 1944) is a restaurateur and the co-owner of Le Bernardin in New York City.

In 1972 she moved to Paris to open the first version of Le Bernardin with her brother Gilbert Le Coze. After receiving multiple Michelin stars in Paris between 1976 and 1981, Maguy and Gilbert opened a second Le Bernardin in New York in 1986.

In 2013 Maguy became the first woman to receive a James Beard Award for Outstanding Restaurateur.

== Ratings and reviews ==
- Le Bernardin, four-star rating from The New York Times since 1986.
- Le Bernardin, three-star rating from the Michelin Guide since 2005.
- Le Bernardin, number 17 on The World's 50 Best Restaurants list for 2017.

== Awards ==
- 1996, Legion Of Honour.
- 2013, James Beard Award for Outstanding Restaurateur.
