= Lobster Pot (restaurant) =

Restaurant in Provincetown, Massachusetts

The Lobster Pot
- Lobster Pot on Commercial Street
- Interactive map of The Lobster Pot

Restaurant information
- Established: 1979; 47 years ago
- Food type: seafood
- Location: Provincetown, Massachusetts
- Coordinates: 42.05192°N 70.18525°W
- Website: www.ptownlobsterpot.com

The Lobster Pot is a restaurant in Provincetown, Massachusetts in the United States.

The iconic establishment at 321 Commercial Street had humble beginnings. The building itself was first home to the Colonial Tap, opened by Manuel Cook in 1937. It would move next door in 1943 becoming Old Colony Tap. The building would not be vacant for long as that very same year Ralph Medeiros and his wife Adeline opened the Lobster Pot. After Ralph died in 1965 Adeline remarried and kept the restaurant in the family until 1979. It was at this point that a second family would take over as Adeline sold the business to Joy McNulty. In January 2023, it was announced the Lobster Pot was for sale for $14 million. The price includes the brand, land, business, equipment and buildings.

It is open seasonally, from April until November.

== In popular culture ==
The Lobster Pot was featured on an episode of the television series Anthony Bourdain: Parts Unknown. Anthony Bourdain had worked at the restaurant during the 1970s.
