= The Nasty Bits =

2006 book by Anthony Bourdain

The Nasty Bits: Collected Varietal Cuts, Usable Trim, Scraps, and Bones
- Author: Anthony Bourdain
- Language: English
- Genre: Food/Travel
- Publisher: Bloomsbury USA
- Publication date: May 16, 2006
- Publication place: United States
- Pages: 288
- ISBN: 1-58234-451-5
- Preceded by: Anthony Bourdain's Les Halles Cookbook
- Followed by: No Reservations: Around the World on an Empty Stomach

The Nasty Bits: Collected Varietal Cuts, Usable Trim, Scraps, and Bones, is a largely nonfiction New York Times bestselling book by Anthony Bourdain, published in 2006. The book is a collection of 37 exotic, provocative, and humorous anecdotes and essays, many of them centered around food, followed by a 30-page fiction piece ("A Chef's Christmas"). The book concludes with an appendix of commentaries on the various pieces, including when and why they were written.

The essays range from descriptions of restaurant-kitchen life; to various rants about places, people, and things Bourdain objects to; to lively accounts of far-flung world travels and remote ethnic life and food; to accolades of the unsung Latinos who cook most fine-dining restaurant food in America; to glowing reports of cutting-edge chefs like Ferran Adrià; to details of Bourdain's obsessions and pursuits when he is not working; to opinions and anecdotes on various other subjects.

Bourdain organized the various essays and anecdotes into sections named for each of the five traditional flavors:

- Salty
- Sweet
- Sour
- Bitter
- Umami

The book is, according to Bourdain, basically a collection of the best of his magazine and newspaper writings during the previous few years. As he says in the preface:

I've done a lot of writing for magazines and newspapers in the last few years, and it's the better morsels (I hope) from that work that follow. ... I've been writing this stuff for much the same reason behind my frenetic traveling: Because I can. Because there's so little time. Because there's been so much to see and remember. ....

It's an irritating reality that many places and events defy description. Angkor Wat and Machu Picchu, for instance, seem to demand silence, like a love affair you can never talk about. For a while after, you fumble for words, trying vainly to assemble a private narrative, an explanation, a comfortable way to frame where you've been and what's happened. In the end, you're just happy you were there—with your eyes open—and lived to see it.
