= A Cook's Tour (TV series) =

- Starring: Anthony Bourdain (host)
- Country of origin: United States
- No. of episodes: 35

Production
- Running time: Approx. 00:22:00 per episode

Original release
- Network: Food Network
- Release: 2002 – 2003

A Cook's Tour is a travel and food show that aired on Food Network. Host Anthony Bourdain visits various countries and cities worldwide where hosts treat him to local culture and cuisine. Two seasons of episodes were produced in 2000 and 2001 and first aired from January 2002 to 2003 in the United States on the Food Network. As of 2023, the series is formally available across multiple online platforms such as YouTube, Tubi and Local Now through distributor Questar Entertainment under the GoTraveler brand.

== Production ==
NYU film program graduate Lydia Tenaglia, working at New York Times Television, picked up the book Kitchen Confidential, and, learning that Bourdain was proposing an Innocents Abroad-style travel journal as a follow-up project, picked up the phone and made a cold call.

The show was filmed with two Sony PD100 DV camcorders.

== Reception ==
In Variety, Phil Gallo says, "For once, Food Network is putting on display food you can’t do at home — and they show that acquiring the ingredients isn’t all pretty before the meal hits the dining room table." Bourdain's account of his trip to Cambodia in Episodes 5 and 6 of Season 1 has been criticised by professor of French and Film Studies at Clemson University Joseph Mai as "filled with tawdry stereotypes" and largely ignoring Cambodian cuisine. Mai contrasts them to the later No Reservations to reflect on Bourdain's transformation in ethics and understanding towards Cambodia and its history.

== Episodes ==
=== Season 1 ===
#	Prod Num	DVD	Title	Place Visited
1	TB1A01	Disk 5	A Taste of Tokyo	Tokyo
2	TB1A02	Disk 5	Dining with Geishas	Atami and Tokyo, Japan
3	TB1A03	Disk 6	Cobra Heart - Foods That Make You Manly	Ho Chi Minh City, Vietnam
4	TB1A04	Disk 6	Eating on the Mekong	Mekong River, Vietnam
5	TB1A05	Disk 6	Wild Delicacies	Phnom Penh and Siem Reap, Cambodia
6	TB1A06	Disk 5	Eating on the Edge of Nowhere	Pailin, Cambodia and Tokyo, Japan
7	TB1A07	Disk 3	Cod Crazy	Porto and Douro Valley, Portugal
8	TB1A08	Disk 3	San Sebastian: A Food Lover's Town	San Sebastián, Spain
9	TB1A09	Disk 3	Childhood Flavors	Arcachon, France
10	TB1A10	Disk 3	Stuffed Like a Pig	Portugal, south-western France
11	TB1A11	Disk 4	A Desert Feast	Morocco (Sahara)
12	TB1A12	Disk 4	Traditional Tastes	Morocco (cities)
13	TB1A13	Disk 4	The Cook Who Came in From the Cold	Saint Petersburg
14	TB1A14	Disk 4	So Much Vodka, So Little Time	Saint Petersburg
15	TB1A15	Disk 2	Tamales and Iguana, Oaxacan Style	Oaxaca, Mexico
16	TB1A16	Disk 2	Puebla, Where the Good Cooks Are From	Puebla, Mexico
17	TB1A17	Disk 1	Los Angeles, My Own Heart of Darkness	Los Angeles
18	TB1A18	Disk 1	The French Laundry Experience	Napa Valley and San Francisco
19	TB1A19	Disk 1	My Hometown Favorites	New York City
20	TB1A20	Disk 1	My Life as a Cook	New York City and Provincetown, MA
21	TB1A21	Disk 3	Highland Grub	Scotland
22	TB1A22	Disk 3	A Pleasing Palate	London

=== Season 2 ===
#	Prod Num	DVD	Title	Place Visited
1	TB1B01	Disk 2	Food Tastes Better with Sand Between Your Toes	St. Martin
2	TB1B02	Disk 1	No Beads, No Babes, No Bourbon Street	New Orleans
3	TB1B03	Disk 2	A Mystical World	Salvador
4	TB1B04	Disk 2	How to Be a Carioca	Rio de Janeiro and Niterói, Brazil
5	TB1B05	Disk 1	Elements of a Great Bar	New York City
6	TB1B06	Disk 1	The Struggle for the Soul of America	Minneapolis, MN
7	TB1B07	Disk 1	The BBQ Triangle	Kansas City, Houston, and North Carolina
8	TB1B08	Disk 5	Mad Tony: The Food Warrior	Sydney
9	TB1B09	Disk 5	Down Under: The Wild West of Cooking	Melbourne
10	TB1B10	Disk 6	Singapore: New York in Twenty Years	Singapore
11	TB1B11	Disk 6	Let's Get Lost	Chiang Mai, Thailand
12	TB1B12	Disk 6	My Friend Linh	Hanoi, Vietnam
13	TB1B13	Disk 6	Thailand: One Night in Bangkok	Bangkok, Thailand and Singapore

== Notes ==
1. Episodes are categorized by region in the DVD box set; one or two regions per disk. Disk 1: The United States; Disk 2: Mexico and the Americas; Disk 3: Europe; Disk 4: Morocco and Russia; Disk 5: Australia and Japan; Disk 6: Asia
2. Early versions of the DVD box set were shipped mistakenly missing episode TB1A04, Eating on the Mekong. Replacements were made available by Questar.
