= Kitchen Confidential =

2000 book by Anthony Bourdain

Kitchen Confidential: Adventures in the Culinary Underbelly
- First edition
- Author: Anthony Bourdain
- Language: English
- Genre: Memoir
- Publisher: Bloomsbury Publishing
- Publication date: August 2000
- Publication place: United States
- Media type: Print (hardback & paperback)
- Pages: 320
- ISBN: 0-7475-5072-7
- Followed by: A Cook's Tour: In Search of the Perfect Meal

Kitchen Confidential: Adventures in the Culinary Underbelly is a New York Times bestselling nonfiction book written by American chef Anthony Bourdain, first published in 2000. In 2018, following Bourdain's death, it topped the New York Times non-fiction paperback and non-fiction combined e-book and print lists.

In 1999, Bourdain's essay "Don't Eat Before Reading This" was published in The New Yorker. The essay, submitted by Bourdain's mother, a New York Times copy editor whose colleague was married to the editor of The New Yorker, launched Bourdain's media career and served as the foundation for Kitchen Confidential. Released in 2000 to wide acclaim, the book is both a professional memoir and an unfiltered look at the less glamorous aspects of high-end restaurant kitchens, which he describes as unremittingly intense, unpleasant, hazardous, and staffed by misfits. Bourdain believes that the kitchen is no place for dilettantes or slackers and that only those with a masochistic dedication to cooking will remain undeterred.

== Synopsis ==
Structured as a loose collection of humorous anecdotes, Kitchen Confidential is equal parts confessional narrative and industry commentary on the cooking trade. Bourdain has cited George Orwell's Down and Out in Paris and London (1933), with its behind-the-scenes examination of the restaurant business in 1920s Paris, as an important influence on the book's themes and tone. He details some of his personal misdeeds and weaknesses, including drug use. He explains how restaurants function economically and warns consumers of the various tricks of restaurateurs. For example, he famously advises customers to avoid ordering fish on a Monday as it is likely left over from the weekend or earlier. He also suggests avoiding well-done beef, since cheaper cuts are often substituted for the top-quality meat used for rarer orders.

== Adaptations ==
In 2005, the book was adapted into a television show of the same name, starring Bradley Cooper as a fictionalized Bourdain. The series was cancelled partway into its first season, and only 13 episodes were produced.

The first two chapters of the memoir are the basis of the 2026 film Tony, starring Dominic Sessa as a young Bourdain.

== Subsequent work ==
A follow-up work, Medium Raw, was published in 2010.

In 2017, amidst the Me Too movement, Bourdain expressed remorse that Kitchen Confidential "celebrated or prolonged a culture that allowed the kind of grotesque behaviors we're hearing about all too frequently".
