= MasterChef Québec =

Canadian cooking reality television series

- Genre: Cookery / Reality competition / Food
- Created by: Franc Roddam
- Judges: Stefano Faita; Martin Picard
- Country of origin: Canada
- Original language: French
- No. of seasons: 2
- No. of episodes: 106

Production
- Running time: 21 minutes

Original release
- Network: TVA
- Release: January 8, 2024

Related
- MasterChef Canada

MasterChef Québec is a Québécois competitive cooking reality show, part of the MasterChef franchise, open to amateur home cooks across Quebec. It premiered on TVA on January 8, 2024.

On September 3, 2024, TVA placed casting calls for MasterChef Junior Québec featuring Junior contestants from the ages of 8–13. The first season of MasterChef Junior Québec premiered on TVA on April 28, 2025.

== Format ==
On MasterChef Québec, amateur, non-professional homecooks are given the opportunity to compete in a series of challenges to win a trophy, a CA$50,000 cash prize, and the title of MasterChef Québec. The first season began with a larger group of finalists invited to compete in a face-off in order to win a white apron and a spot in the primary stages of the competition. Stefano Faita and Martin Picard currently serve as the series' judges.

== Judges and hosts ==
- Stefano Faita, chef and restaurateur.
- Martin Picard, chef and owner of Montreal restaurant Au Pied de Cochon.

Additionally, several guest judges are slated to appear throughout the series for specific challenges and episodes.

== Seasons ==
Season	Episodes	Time slot (ET)	Originally aired			Finalists	Winner	Runner-up
Season	Episodes	Time slot (ET)	Season premiere	Season finale	TV season	Finalists	Winner	Runner-up
1	54	Mondays-Thursdays at 7:30 p.m.	January 8, 2024	April 4, 2024	2023–24	16	Sandra Plourde	Fadwa Chtita
2	52	Mondays-Thursdays at 7:30 p.m.	September 9, 2024	December 5, 2024	2024-25	16	Pierre-Alexandre Joly	Jade Auclair-Roy
3	53	Sundays at 8:30 p.m. & Mondays-Wednesdays at 7:30 p.m.	September 7, 2025	December 7, 2025	2025-26	16	Samuel Boisvert	Charlotte Verdier
4		TBA	TBA	TBA	2026-27	20	TBA	TBA

== Season 1 ==
=== Top 16 ===
Contestant	Age	Hometown	Occupation	Status
Sandra Plourde	34	Ste-Croix	Food Inspection Team Leader	Winner April 4
Fadwa Chtita	35	Montreal	Computer Engineer	Runner-Up April 4
Meriem Elbaine	50	Boucherville	Teacher	Eliminated April 2
Pierre-Yves Lévesque	41	Laterrière	General Manager	Eliminated March 28
Jean-Christophe Nadeau	30	Quebec	Director of Board Games Stores	Eliminated March 21
Vincent Notaro	33	Saint-Patrice-de-Sherrington	Farmer	Eliminated January 18; Returned January 23; Eliminated March 14
Alexandre Lapointe	50	Varenne	Service Manager	Eliminated March 7
Désirée Duchesne	45	Saint-Eustache	Supervisor	Eliminated February 29
Yves Lemelin	40	Drummondville	Paver Operator	Eliminated February 27
Simon Caron	31	Rivière-du-Loup	Firefigther	Eliminated February 22
Yvon Larochelle	61	Blainville	Administrator	Eliminated February 15
Kimberly Landerman	37	Saint-Philippe	Automotive Sales Director	Eliminated February 8
Alysan Boudreault	24	Quebec	Nurse	Eliminated February 1
Stéphane Prescott	53	Saint-Félix-de-Valois	RV Entrepreneur	Eliminated January 25
Sonia Rhéaume	56	Quebec	Event Service	Eliminated January 23
Mariel Jomphe	24	Natashquan	Brewer	Left January 23

=== Elimination table ===
Place	Contestants	Week																																
Place	Contestants	2			3			4			5		6			7		8		9				10			11			12		13		
1	Sandra	IN	WIN	IMM	WIN	LOW		IN	WIN	IMM	IN	HIGH	HIGH	WIN	IMM	IN	WIN	IN	WIN	IN	WIN	IMM	IMM	IN	LOSE	WIN	IN	IN	PT	IN	WPT	WIN	IMM	WINNER
2	Fadwa	HIGH	IMM	IMM	IN	WIN		IN	WIN	IMM	IN	PT	IN	IMM	IMM	IN	WIN	HIGH	IMM	IN	IN	WIN	IMM	WIN	WIN	PT	IN	IN	PT	IN	WIN	IN	WIN	RUNNER-UP
3	Meriem	IN	LOW	PT	IN	LOW		IN	WIN	IMM	IN	PT	WIN	IMM	IMM	HIGH	WIN	WIN	IMM	WIN	IMM	IMM	IMM	IN	WIN	PT	IN	IN	PT	IN	WIN	IN	ELIM	
4	Pierre-Yves	IN	LOW	PT	LOW	PT		HIGH	LOW	PT	IN	WIN	IN	LOW	PT	HIGH	LOW	IN	WIN	IN	HIGH	IN	PT	IN	LOSE	WIN	IN	WIN	IMM	IN	ELIM			
5	Jean-Christophe	HIGH	IMM	IMM	IN	PT		WIN	IMM	IMM	HIGH	HIGH	IN	WIN	IMM	IN	WIN	HIGH	LOW	IN	IN	IN	LOW	IN	LOSE	PT	WIN	IN	ELIM					
6	Vincent	IN	LOW	ELIM	RET	WIN	PT	IN	LOW	PT	IN	HIGH	HIGH	IMM	IMM	IN	LOW	LOW	LOW	IN	HIGH	IN	LOW	IN	LOSE	ELIM								
7	Alexandre	IN	LOW	PT	WIN	WIN		HIGH	WIN	IMM	IN	PT	IN	LOW	PT	IN	PT	PT	PT	IN	IN	IN	ELIM											
8	Désirée	IN	WIN	IMM	IN	WIN		HIGH	LOW	PT	IN	WIN	IN	LOW	PT	IN	PT	IN	ELIM															
9	Yves	IN	LOW	LOW	LOW	WIN		IN	LOW	PT	IN	HIGH	IN	LOW	LOW	WIN	WIN	ELIM																
10	Simon	IN	LOW	PT	IN	PT		IN	WIN	IMM	HIGH	PT	IN	LOW	LOW	IN	ELIM																	
11	Yvon	IN	LOW	PT	IN	WIN		IN	LOW	LOW	IN	LOW	IN	LOW	ELIM																			
12	Kimberly	IN	WIN	IMM	IN	WIN		HIGH	WIN	IMM	WIN	ELIM																						
13	Alysan	WIN	IMM	IMM	IN	PT		HIGH	LOW	ELIM																								
14	Stéphane	IN	LOW	PT	IN	ELIM																												
15	Sonia	IN	IMM	IMM	ELIM																													
16	Mariel	IN	LOW	LOW	WDR																													

=== Episodes ===
No. overall	No. in season	Title	Original release date	Prod. code
1	1	"Ép 01. Les affrontements"	January 8, 2024	101
Auditions 1: The judges welcomed the contestants. First, Mélanie Germain, a 50-year-old retired woman from Orford, faced off against Yvon, a 61-year-old administrator from Blainville, in a battle of tartare. Yvon won a white apron. Last, Fadwa, a 35-year-old computer engineer from Montreal, faced off against Stéphane Gabriel Prescott, a 53-year-old consulting service vice president from Saint-Félix-de-Valois, in a battle of steaks. The episode ended in a cliffhanger as Fadwa presented her dish to the judges.
2	2	"Ép 02. Les affrontements"	January 9, 2024	102
Auditions 1: First, continuing from the previous episode, both Fadwa and Stéphane won white aprons. Next, Jessica Francis, a 38-year-old special education technician from Wendake living in Montreal, Ginette Rainville, a 60-year-old pharmaceutical training administrator from Saint-Eustache, Mariel Jomphe, a 24-year-old brewer from Natashquan, and Diane Guillot, a 61-year-old food store manager from Stoneham-et-Tewkesbury, faced off in a battle of desserts. Mariel won a white apron. Following this, a montage of three contestants, Alysan Boudreault, a 24-year-old nurse from Quebec, Sandra Plourde, a 34-year-old food inspection team leader from Ste-Croix, and Jean-Christophe Nadeau, a 30-year-old director of board games stores from Quebec, cooking their dishes with unnamed opponents and winning white aprons was shown. Last, Julie Couvrette, a 47-year-old social development officer from Rivière-du-Loup, Philippe, a 30-year-old dentist from Montreal, and Sonia Rhéaume, a 58-year-old event service attendant from Quebec, faced off in a battle of seafood pasta. The episode ended in a cliffhanger as the judges were about to reveal the winner of the white apron.

== Season 2 ==
=== Top 16 ===
Contestant	Age	Hometown	Occupation	Status
Pierre-Alexandre Joly	33	Sherbrooke	Special Ed Teacher	Winner December 5
Jade Auclair-Roy	32	Quebec City	Real Estate Appraiser	Runner-Up December 5
Josianne Falardeau	44	Notre-Dame-de-l'Île-Perrot	Head of Procurement Division	Eliminated December 3
Chris Nhut Truong	36	Montreal	Firefighter	Eliminated November 28
Josie Tremblay	32	Chicoutimi	CHSLD Manager	Eliminated November 21
Bianka Martel	34	Mashteuiatsh	Social Worker & Beauty Care Technician	Eliminated November 14
Isabelle Séguin-Zilio	25	Montreal	Data Scientist	Eliminated November 7
Martin Gagnon	51	Stoneham	Information Officer	Eliminated October 31
Gerry Rembeyo	42	Montreal	Industrial Engineering Analyst	Eliminated October 24
Jordan Morin	26	Sainte-Julienne	Insulation Worker	Eliminated October 17
Jake Prévost	32	Montreal	Artist, Producer, & DJ	Eliminated October 10
Johanne Brosseau	68	Laval	Retired	Eliminated October 8
Pierre Martin	56	Montreal	Entrepreneur	Eliminated October 3
Maude Dumas-Bonneau	28	Quebec City	High School Teacher	Quit September 26
Annie-Claude Jutras	40	Lévis	Actuary	Eliminated September 19
Sébastien St-Germain	31	Montreal	IT Consultant	Eliminated September 12

=== Elimination Table ===
Place	Contestants	Week																																			
Place	Contestants	1		2			3		4			5			6			7		8		9				10				11			12		13		
1	Pierre-Alexandre	IN	WIN	IN	WIN	IMM	WIN	PT	WIN	WIN	IMM	IN	IN	WIN	IN	WIN	IMM	WIN	PT	IN	WIN	IN	IN	WIN	IMM	WIN	IN	LOW	PT	WIN	LOW	PT	IN	WIN	IN	WIN	WINNER
2	Jade	IN	PT	IN	WIN	IMM	IN	PT	HIGH	WIN	IMM	IN	IN	PT	HIGH	LOW	PT	HIGH	WIN	IN	WIN	HIGH	WIN	WIN	IMM	IN	WIN	IMM	IMM	IN	LOW	PT	IN	WIN	WIN	IMM	RUNNER-UP
3	Josianne	IN	WIN	HIGH	WIN	IMM	IN	WIN	IN	WIN	IMM	IN	IN	PT	HIGH	WIN	IMM	IN	WIN	IN	LOW	IN	IN	LOW	PT	IN	IN	LOW	PT	WIN	LOW	PT	IN	WPT	IN	ELIM	
4	Chris	WIN	PT	HIGH	WIN	IMM	IN	PT/IMM	IN	LOW	PT	IN	IN	WIN	IN	LOW	PT	IN	WIN	IN	WIN	WIN	WIN	LOW	PT	IN	IN	LOW	PT	IN	WIN	IMM	WIN	ELIM			
5	Josie	IN	WIN	IN	LOW	LOW	IN	LOW	IN	WIN	IMM	IN	IN	WIN	WIN	IMM	IMM	IN	PT	WIN	WIN	HIGH	IN	WIN	IMM	IN	IN	WIN	IMM	IN	LOW	ELIM					
6	Bianka	IN	PT	IN	WIN	IMM	IN	WIN	IN	WIN	IMM	WIN	IMM	IMM	IN	LOW	PT	IN	PT	IN	PT	IN	IN	LOW	PT	IN	IN	LOW	ELIM								
7	Isabelle	IN	PT	IN	WIN	IMM	HIGH	WIN	HIGH	LOW	PT	IN	IN	WIN	IN	WIN	IMM	HIGH	PT	IN	PT	IN	IN	LOW	ELIM												
8	Martin	IN	WIN	IN	WIN	IMM	IN	WIN	IN	WIN	IMM	IN	IN	PT	IN	LOW	LOW	IN	LOW	IN	ELIM																
9	Gerry	IN	WIN	IN	WIN	IMM	IN	WIN	IN	LOW	LOW	IN	LOW	LOW	IN	WIN	IMM	IN	ELIM																		
10	Jordan	IN	LOW	IN	LOW	PT	IN	LOW	IN	WIN	IMM	IN	IN	WIN	IN	LOW	ELIM																				
11	Jake	IN	WIN	IN	WIN	IMM	IN	WIN	IN	LOW	PT	IN	IN	ELIM																							
12	Johanne	IN	LOW	IN	LOW	PT	IN	PT	IN	WIN	IMM	IN	ELIM																								
13	Pierre	IN	WIN	IN	WIN	IMM	IN	WIN	IN	LOW	ELIM																										
14	Maude	IN	WIN	IN	LOW	PT	HIGH	WDR																													
15	Annie-Claude	IN	PT	WIN	LOW	ELIM																															
16	Sébastien	IN	ELIM																																		

== Season 3 ==
=== Top 16 ===
Contestant	Age	Hometown	Occupation	Status
Samuel Boisvert	29	Sherbrooke	Marketing Strategist	Winner December 7
Charlotte Verdier	26	Montreal	Entrepreneur	Runner-Up December 7
Corine Ouellet	45	Lévis	Territory Manager	Eliminated December 3
Jean-Sébastien Di Fruscia	42	Laval	Doctor	Eliminated December 1
Anne-Catherine Leclerc	30	Rosemère	Training Director	Eliminated November 30
Alexandre Archambault	30	Montreal	Artist Manager	Eliminated November 23
Valérie Heppell	26	Mirabel	Accounting Student	Eliminated November 16
Frédérick Levesque	33	Quebec City	Nursing Student	Eliminated November 9
Lydiane Pinel	37	Lévis	Entrepreneur	Eliminated November 2
Hugo Houde	37	Montreal	Actuary	Eliminated October 26
Nancy Lavoie	50	Saint-Lazare	Dental Assistant	Eliminated October 19
Raphaël Vézina	33	Quebec City	Server	Eliminated October 12
Louis Murray	48	La Malbaie	Construction Foreman	Eliminated October 5
Tammy Hurteau	36	Boucherville	Magazine Project Manager	Eliminated September 28
Nathalie Robitaille	54	Saint-Lambert-de-Lauzon	Retired	Eliminated September 21
Jim Meunier	41	Saint-Hyacinthe	Real Estate Broker	Eliminated September 14

=== Elimination Table ===
Place	Contestants	Week																																
Place	Contestants	1		2			3		4			5			6		7		8			9			10		11			12		13		
1	Samuel	IN	PT	IN	IN	PT	WIN	LOW	IN	WIN	IMM	IN	IN	LOW	WIN	WIN	IN	WIN	IN	WIN	IMM	IN	WIN	IMM	IN	WPT	IN	IN	PT 2	IN	PT	IN	WIN	WINNER
2	Charlotte	IN	LOW	IN	WIN	IMM	IN	WIN	WIN	WIN	IMM	HIGH	WIN	IMM	IN	PT	IN	WIN	IN	IN	PT	WIN	IMM	IMM	IN	PT	WIN	HIGH	PT 2	IN	WPT	WIN	IMM	RUNNER-UP
3	Corine	IN	WIN	HIGH	IN	IMM	IN	WIN	IN	IN	WIN	IN	WIN	IMM	IN	PT	IN	WIN	IN	IN	PT	IN	IN	PT	IN	WIN	IN	IN	PT 1	WIN	IMM	IN	ELIM	
4	Jean-Sébastien	IN	WIN	IN	IN	PT	HIGH	PT	IN	IN	PT	IN	IN	PT	IN	PT	WIN	WIN	IN	IN	PT	IN	IN	PT	IN	WIN	IN	IN	DNP	IN	PT	ELIM		
5	Anne-Catherine	IN	PT	IN	IN	IMM	IN	PT	IN	IN	WIN	IN	WIN	IMM	HIGH	WIN	IN	PT	IN	HIGH	IMM	IN	IN	LOW	IN	PT	IN	WIN	IMM	IN	ELIM			
6	Alexandre	IN	PT	IN	IN	PT	IN	PT	IN	IN	PT	IN	WIN	IMM	IN	PT	HIGH	PT	WIN	IN	PT	IN	IN	LOW	IN	PT	IN	IN	ELIM					
7	Valérie	IN	WIN	IN	IN	IMM	IN	PT	HIGH	WIN	IMM	IN	IN	PT	HIGH	LOW	IN	LOW	HIGH	IN	PT	IN	IN	PT	WIN	ELIM								
8	Frédérick	IN	PT	IN	IN	PT	IN	WIN	HIGH	IN	WIN	IN	WIN	IMM	IN	PT	IN	PT	HIGH	HIGH	IMM	IN	IN	ELIM										
9	Lydiane	IN	PT	IN	IN	PT	IN	PT	HIGH	WIN	IMM	WIN	WIN	IMM	IN	PT	IN	WIN	IN	IN	ELIM													
10	Hugo	IN	WIN	HIGH	IN	PT	IN	WIN	IN	WIN	IMM	IN	IN	PT	IN	WIN	HIGH	ELIM																
11	Nancy	IN	PT	IN	IN	IMM	IN	WIN	IN	IN	WIN	HIGH	IN	PT	IN	ELIM																		
12	Raphaël	WIN	LOSE/IMM	IN	IN	LOW	HIGH	WIN	IN	IN	LOW	IN	IN	ELIM																				
13	Louis	IN	PT	IN	IN	IMM	IN	WIN	IN	IN	ELIM																							
14	Tammy	IN	PT	WIN	IN	IMM	IN	ELIM																										
15	Nathalie	IN	LOW	IN	IN	ELIM																												
16	Jim	IN	ELIM																															

== Season 4 ==
=== Top 20 ===
Contestant	Age	Hometown	Occupation	Status
Carl Boutin	54	Delson	CHSLD Manager	
Carmen Aubé	33	Gatineau	Lawyer	
Caroline Dupont	51	Mont-Saint-Grégoire	Assistant Director	
Claudine Gastin	39	Montreal	Photographer	
Daniel Ménard	65	L’Île-Bizard	Entrepreneur	
Didier Ricard-Tremblay	33	Mascouche	Urban Planner	
Geneviève Fortin Bilodeau	39	Chicoutimi	Clinical Nurse	
Karine Lagueux	52	Lévis	Business Owner	
Kim Nunès	41	Saint-Jérôme	Teacher	
Léa Charest	32	Rimouski	Traveling Sales Representative	
Lucie Brosseau	63	Boucherville	Retired Corporate Executive	
Marc Lapointe	39	Boischatel	Ministry of Education Advisor	
Marc-André Tardif	35	Saint-Eustache	Manager	
Maxime Soucy	35	Montreal	Artistic Director	
Michael Berlangieri	33	Laval	Videographer	
Nancy Guillemette	46	Saint-Hubert	Nurse Practitioner	
Nancy Laforge	45	Prévost	Financial Recovery Counselor	
Sara Levesque	27	Montreal	Social Worker	
Sophia Moeck	24	Montreal	First Aid Consultant	
Sophian Verri	39	Montreal	Video Director	

=== Elimination Table ===
Place	Contestants	Week												
Place	Contestants	1	2	3	4	5	6	7	8	9	10	11	12	13
	Carl													
	Carmen													
	Caroline													
	Claudine													
	Daniel													
	Didier													
	Geneviève													
	Karine													
	Kim													
	Léa													
	Lucie													
	Marc													
	Marc-André													
	Maxime													
	Michael													
	Nancy G.													
	Nancy L.													
	Sara													
	Sophia													
	Sophian													

== See also ==
- MasterChef Junior Québec
