= Anthony Bourdain: No Reservations =

American travel and food show

- Created by: Zero Point Zero Production
- Presented by: Anthony Bourdain
- Country of origin: United States
- No. of seasons: 9
- No. of episodes: 142

Production
- Running time: Domestic: one hour (approx. 42 min. per episode); International: approx. 48 min. per episode

Original release
- Network: Travel Channel
- Release: July 25, 2005 – November 5, 2012

Anthony Bourdain: No Reservations is an American travel and food show that originally aired on the Travel Channel in the United States and on Discovery Travel & Living internationally. In it, host Anthony Bourdain visits various countries and cities, as well as places within the U.S., where he explores local culture and cuisine. The format and content of the show is similar to Bourdain's 2001–2002 Food Network series, A Cook's Tour. The show premiered in 2005 and concluded its nine-season run with the series finale episode (Brooklyn) on November 5, 2012.

The special episode Anthony Bourdain in Beirut that aired between Seasons 2 and 3 was nominated for an Emmy Award for Outstanding Informational Programming in 2007. In 2009 and 2011, the series won the Emmy for "Outstanding Cinematography For Nonfiction Programming".

== Episodes ==
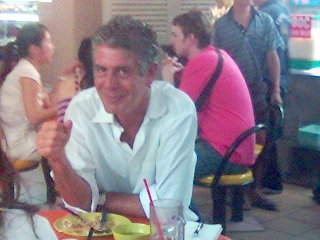
Anthony Bourdain filming the show in Singapore, 2006

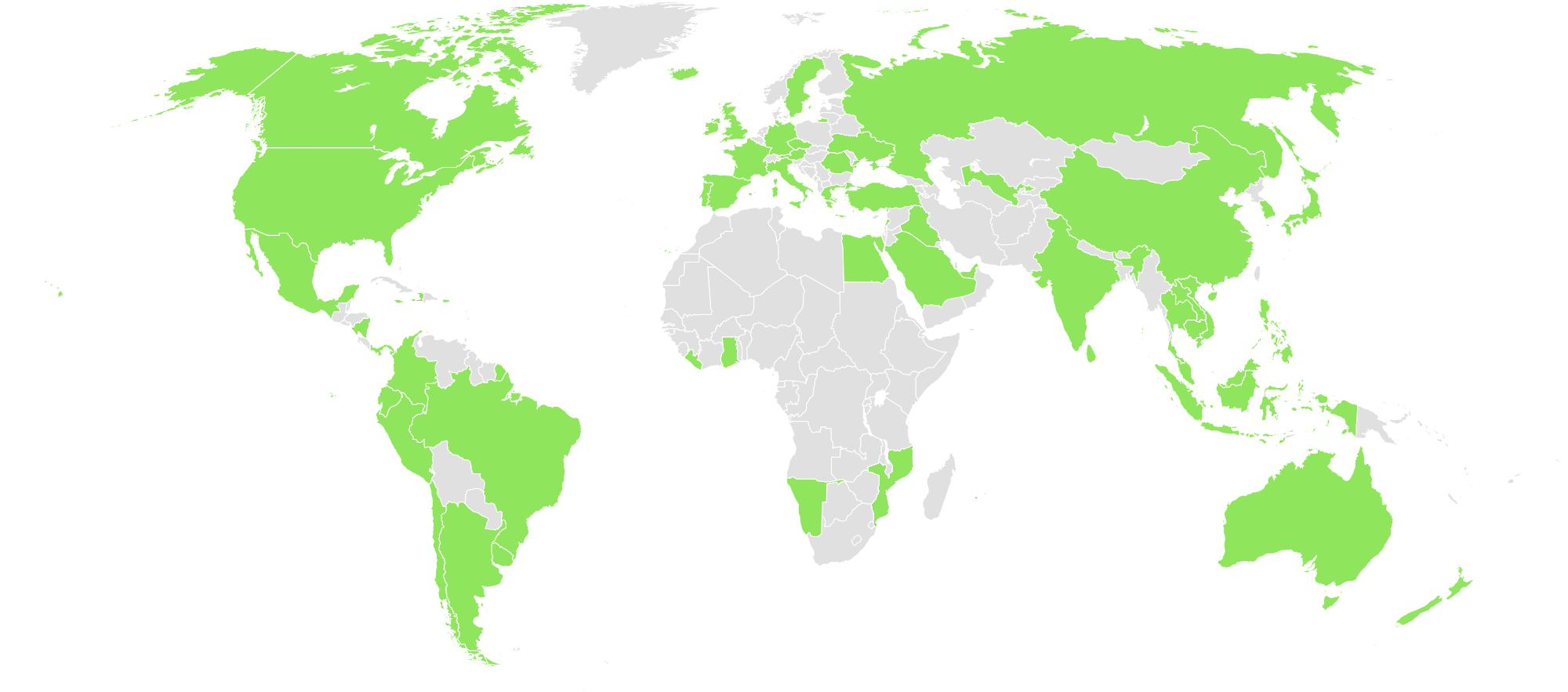
Countries in green have been visited on the show at least once

=== Season 1 ===
No. overall	No. in season	Title	Original release date
1	1–01	"Paris: Why the French Don't Suck"	July 25, 2005
Tony's debut episode of this new series has him visiting Paris. He explores the city's famous catacombs, tries some absinthe, checks out one of the city's major meat markets, and spends the night in the room where Oscar Wilde died.
2	1–02	"Iceland: Hello Darkness My Old Friend"	August 1, 2005
This week Anthony travels to Reykjavík, Iceland, where in winter the volcanic islands see only about four hours of sunlight a day. Anthony finds the darkness comforting and learns how the Icelanders contend with the dark days - eating, drinking, spending time at the spa, and pumping iron! Tony tries Hákarl (fermented shark). Later, he visits the famous Blue Lagoon.
3	1–03	"New Jersey"	August 8, 2005
Tony visits the state of New Jersey. He takes us on a trip through his birthplace trying to dispel some common misconceptions of the Garden State. We learn about The Sopranos and other NJ landmarks as Tony reminisces. He also meets up with Nari Kye, an assistant, who teaches him Korean food.
4	1–04	"Vietnam: The Island of Mr. Sang"	August 15, 2005
Responding to an invitation from an old friend, Linh. Tony travels to Hanoi, Mai Châu and Tuần Châu, Vietnam with the feeling of James Bond-ish intrigue, discovering its food like squeasel, its customs, and the not-so-sinister plans for international tourism.
5	1–05	"Malaysia: Into the Jungle"	August 22, 2005
Tony has always had an interest in "natural fusion" or the way cuisines intertwine with cultures over the course of history. In Kuala Lumpur, Malaysia, this is particularly true as a variety of cultures have blended. Chef Wan gives Tony a tour of a wet market and hawker stalls in Kuala Lumpur. Inspired to find his own Heart of Darkness and live out his inner Kurtz, Tony rides up the Skrang River to visit with an Iban village.
6	1–06	"Sicily"	October 10, 2005
While on the island of Sicily, Tony is treated to tripe at the II Capo Market. He tries a spleen sandwich with the Governor of Sicily (Salvatore Cuffaro). Tony is persuaded to try a cliff dive and attempts to determine where you can find the greatest cannoli.
7	1–07	"Las Vegas"	October 17, 2005
Given an assignment to write about Las Vegas food by a food magazine, Tony spends four days exploring the city and learns how it's transforming into a mecca for chefs. Heavily influenced/homage to Hunter S. Thompson's book Fear and Loathing in Las Vegas.
8	1–08	"Uzbekistan"	October 24, 2005
Tashkent to Samarkand, Uzbekistan. Tony explores the 2000-year-old city of Tashkent, capital of Uzbekistan, with his friend Zamir Gotta. He partakes in local culture, attends a wedding, and receives a traumatizing full-body massage at a sauna.
9	1–09	"New Zealand: Down Under the Down Under"	November 7, 2005
Tony is invited to New Zealand to lecture at a gourmet food convention. But after receiving a lukewarm reception from the crowd, he decides to search for real Kiwi culture outside the city of Christchurch. Tony's ride on an ATV becomes a little harrowing. Tony is invited to visit the Māori.

=== Season 2 ===
Three special episodes were aired in 2006, one before the season, and two after.

No. overall	No. in season	Title	Original release date
10	Special	"Leftovers"	March 27, 2006
A look behind the scenes of "No Reservations."
11	2–01	"Asia Special: China & Japan"	March 27, 2006
In this special two-hour season two premiere, Tony's culinary journey takes him to the main hubs of Asian cuisine: Japan and China. In Japan, he visits Osaka, where he learns all about the Hanshin Tigers-Yomiuri Giants baseball rivalry; to Japan's version of vaudeville, manzai; and to kuidaore (eating oneself to ruin) where he samples takoyaki, okonomiyaki and later sushi. From there, Tony meets up with an old friend, Michiko, and they travel to Kisoji for a water purification ritual; learn the exchange of meishi and help celebrate Obon. Later, Tony attends a Hanshin Tigers game. In China, a country Tony has never visited, he attempts to tackle as much of its cuisine and culture as he can in a short period of time. Beijing is Tony's first stop, where he samples Peking duck, the nasty bits of a sheep, and a variety of noodles at a noodle house. Tony gets a lesson in Chinese calligraphy and visits a doctor for some traditional Chinese medicine such as acupuncture, fire cupping, and electroacupuncture. From there, Tony is off to Sichuan province, where he receives an unorthodox ear cleaning, visits the Jianfu Temple, center of Taoism during the Tang dynasty, and samples Sichuan hotpot. He ends his visit in a village outside of Chengdu for a family dinner that uses the old methods of Chinese cooking.
12	2–02	"South Florida"	April 3, 2006
Tony figures he'll lounge poolside at his South Beach hotel for this entire episode but instead is encouraged to explore the ethnic diversity and uniqueness of Miami, and South Florida: from Little Haiti to the Everglades to Key West and Little Havana.
13	2–03	"Peru"	April 10, 2006
Tony meets famous Peruvian chef Gastón Acurio, tries Peruvian Ceviche and goes sightseeing in the capital city, Lima. Then he travels to a village in Tambopata, the Peruvian jungle, and tries piranhas and goes through unique experiences. Finally he visits the city of Cusco to try new stuff in a local market and Machu Picchu, where he tries to find peace of mind.
14	2–04	"Quebec"	April 17, 2006
Tony visits the province of Quebec in Canada. He visits a duck farm with famed chef Martin Picard, then enjoys a decadent, foie gras-heavy meal at Picard's restaurant, Au Pied de Cochon in Montreal. He flies north to go seal hunting with the Inuit. He also enjoys poutine at La Banquise, sausages with maple syrup at a sugar house, and Montreal-style bagels, and learns to play hockey.
15	2–05	"Sweden"	April 24, 2006
Tony visits Stockholm, Sweden, and tries local specialties like fläsklägg (pig knuckles) and tunnbrödsrulle (Swedish flatbread).
16	2–06	"Puerto Rico"	May 1, 2006
Tony visits Puerto Rico and tries to see the less-touristic side of the island. After a bad start drinking a piña colada at the bar where the drink was invented, he enjoys roast pork at a lechonera, as well as mofongo, goes scuba-diving in an unsuccessful attempt to catch a giant lobster, and tries horseback riding. He also searches for the mythical chupacabra and goes sparring with boxing champion Miguel Cotto. He visits a music festival and enjoys chicharrón in Bayamón.
17	2–07	"Japan"	May 8, 2006
Osaka, Japan [Note: This episode is the same as part one of "Asia Special: China & Japan"]
18	2–08	"U.S./Mexico Border"	May 22, 2006
Tony visits Piedras Negras, Mexico, and border towns in Texas, where he sees the influences that the countries have had on each other. He also visits the Mexican restaurant credited with inventing nachos.
19	2–09	"India (Rajasthan)"	May 29, 2006
Tony visits the state of Rajasthan in India. He visits the city of Udaipur and enjoys a vegetarian thali, then attends a dinner and lavish party hosted by the Maharana of Udaipur. He visits a local chef for a home-cooked meal and spends time with a guru in an ashram in the city of Jodhpur. He takes a long bus ride to the city of Jaisalmer and experiences the Jaisalmer Desert Festival.
20	2–10	"India (Kolkata/Mumbai)"	June 5, 2006
Tony visits Kolkata and Mumbai, India, where he learns how to play cricket.
21	2–11	"Korea"	June 12, 2006
Tony visits Seoul in South Korea, as well as a town near the Korean Demilitarized Zone, accompanied by Nari Kye, an assistant on No Reservations. They visit a martial arts class and a spa and try live octopus, kimchi, Korean barbecue and soju. They also meet Kye's family.
22	2–12	"Indonesia"	June 19, 2006
Bourdain visits Jakarta, where he is entertained by Pencak Silat martial arts performers who showcase their ability to withstand torture, shocking Bourdain. Then he enjoys Padang cuisine, including the famed Rendang. During the shooting, the cameraman accidentally wrecks the stacked food plates on display. He then visits Garut where he watches Ram fighting, joins traditional dance and enjoys local cuisine, before relaxing at Kampung Sampireun Hotel Garut. Finally, he travels to Bali to enjoy its famous delicacy, Babi Guling.
23	Special	"Decoding Ferran Adria"	July 3, 2006
Bourdain travels to Spain and visits the research laboratory of Ferran Adrià, renowned chef of el Bulli.
24	Special	"Anthony Bourdain in Beirut"	August 21, 2006
Documentary of a week in July 2006 when Bourdain and his crew were trapped in Beirut, Lebanon, due to the Israel-Lebanon War. This episode was nominated for an Emmy Award for Outstanding Informational Programming in 2007.

=== Season 3 ===
Season 3 was aired in two parts: six episodes in the winter of 2007, and nine in the summer and autumn of 2007. Two special episodes were also aired in 2007, book-ending the regular episodes.

No. overall	No. in season	Title	Original release date
25	Special	"Leftovers 2"	January 1, 2007
A look back at season 2 of No Reservations.
26	3–01	"Ireland"	January 1, 2007
Bourdain visits Dublin and Belfast in Ireland, where he explores the legacy of The Troubles. He samples Irish stew, Guinness and some high-end restaurants, including those of chefs Paul Rankin and Seamus O'Connell.
27	3–02	"Ghana"	January 8, 2007
Bourdain visits Ghana for the first time. In Accra, he samples food such as kenkey and palm wine at the bustling Makola Market, and meets tourism minister Jacob Otanka Obetsebi-Lamptey at the beach, where they help bring in a fish haul and enjoy prepared seafood such as barracuda. He then goes on a tour of the countryside, meeting shea nut harvesters, enjoying the highlife music of Koo Nimo, and seeing kente cloth spinners in action.
28	3–03	"Pacific Northwest"	January 15, 2007
In Portland, Bourdain samples unique donuts and pizza, explores the history of the underground, and goes camping with some old friends. He then heads to Seattle, where he takes in the sights of Pike Place Market, enjoys a Gypsy dinner, tries some Puget Sound geoduck, and spends time with a meat curer friend. Featuring author Chuck Palahniuk.
29	3–04	"Namibia"	January 22, 2007
Bourdain visits Namibia and eats some of the local specialties, including, most memorably, the rectum of a recently killed warthog prepared by local Bushmen. Weeks after eating the warthog, he became severely ill and was put on two weeks of antibiotics. Bourdain has described this as "the worst meal of my life."
30	3–05	"Russia"	January 29, 2007
Bourdain visits Moscow, Russia, accompanied by Zamir Gotta. They explore Moscow's Soviet history, including lunch with former KGB chief Victor Cherkashin, as well as some of the hangouts of Moscow's newly rich. Bourdain then arranges for Zamir to get a painful spa treatment as payback for the massage Tony got in Uzbekistan.
31	3–06	"Los Angeles"	February 5, 2007
Bourdain visits Los Angeles, in search of the local culture, away from the glitz and glamor of Hollywood. He dines at Roscoe's Chicken and Waffles with writer and screenwriter Jerry Stahl. He meets a women's roller derby team, and has French dip sandwiches with them at Philippe's, which claims to have invented the French dip sandwich. He eats at a Mexican restaurant with a mariachi band, and visits the neighborhood of Thai Town. Bourdain trains with the Hawthorne SWAT team.
32	3–07	"From Shanghai to Shangri-la"	July 30, 2007
Bourdain heads back to China and visits Shanghai, a budding economic superpower, where he discovers that Shanghai is considered the dumpling capital of the world made famous by its soup dumpling. Bourdain then heads to Yunnan province. In Dali, he learns from the Bai ethnic minority people a unique way of catching fish. From there, he works his way north to Lijiang, then to Zhongdian, an ethnically Tibetan area, in search of the valley of Shangri-La as described in British author James Hilton's novel Lost Horizon. The Lijiang/Zhongdian area is believed by many to have been the inspiration for the mythical Shangri-la.
33	3–08	"New York City"	August 6, 2007
Bourdain visits the late-night haunts of his hometown of New York City, including a Russian-style night out in Brighton Beach with author Gary Shteyngart, Gray's Papaya, a Japanese izakaya, Siberia Bar with fellow food travel show host Andrew Zimmern, and a favorite of after-work chefs, The Spotted Pig. He also takes a trip to Yankee Stadium.
34	3–09	"Brazil"	August 13, 2007
Bourdain tries to enjoy São Paulo, Brazil as a native paulistano would, with the help of some fun-loving locals. He samples mortadella sandwich, feijoada and many types of meat, including bull testicles, and drinks copious amounts of caipirinha. He lounges on the beach, plays some soccer, and observes preparations for the upcoming carnaval.
35	3–10	"French Polynesia"	August 20, 2007
Bourdain retraces French post-Impressionist artist Paul Gauguin's travels through Tahiti, Tuamotu Archipelago, and the Marquesas Islands to see what drew him there. During Bourdain's stay, he wrangles a shark, learns about Marquesan art such as tikis, and gets inked with a Marquesan tattoo.
36	3–11	"Cleveland"	August 27, 2007
Bourdain travels with food writer Michael Ruhlman to Cleveland, Ruhlman's home town. They have Cincinnati chili at Skyline Chili. Bourdain meets comic-book artist Harvey Pekar. He also visits the Rock and Roll Hall of Fame with Marky Ramone and spends time with chef Michael Symon, both at Symon's restaurant Lola and at a soul food restaurant. Parts of the episode are illustrated in Pekar's comic-book style.
37	3–12	"Hong Kong"	September 3, 2007
Bourdain visits Hong Kong, where he samples and learns about the food, like the masterful art of making noodles using a bamboo pole, chinese barbecue, and dim sum, with a local food blogger. He also films a fight scene with members of the Jackie Chan Stunt Team. Bourdain dines at Chef Alvin Leung's Bo Innovation for his modernized take on Chinese cuisine.
38	3–13	"Argentina"	September 10, 2007
In Buenos Aires, Argentina, Bourdain meets with reggae rock band Los Pericos and visits pioneering conceptual artist Marta Minujín at her studio. He then travels to Patagonia, where he visits the Swiss-style town of Bariloche, tries his hand at paragliding, and spends time with some gauchos, learning their lifestyle.
39	3–14	"South Carolina"	September 17, 2007
Bourdain visits South Carolina, where he enjoys local favorites like shrimp, grits and barbecue. He also participates in a Civil War reenactment.
40	3–15	"Tuscany"	September 24, 2007
Bourdain visits Tuscany, Italy, where he samples the local wine and cheese and encounters the world's most famous butcher, "The Butcher of Panzano", Dario Cecchini. He also clashes with the episode's director, the Italian auteur Vincenzo Tripodo, who dreams of making the episode an homage to Dante's Inferno.
41	Special	"Holiday Special: Connecticut"	December 10, 2007
Bourdain visits his brother's family in Connecticut for the holidays, with special guests Queens of the Stone Age. Bourdain gives a cooking tutorial on how to prepare the holiday meal. This episode was produced and directed by Rennik Soholt.

=== Season 4 ===
As with Season 3, Season 4 was aired in two parts: nine episodes in the winter of 2008, and ten in the summer of 2008. Various sources have referred to the summer episodes as Season 5, but in a post on his blog regarding the September 1, 2008 episode, Bourdain refers to it as the final episode of Season 4. One special episode followed the regular 2008 episodes.

No. overall	No. in season	Title	Original release date
42	4–01	"Singapore"	January 7, 2008
Tony discovers the "Hawker Centers" (Singapore style food courts) featuring the local specialty chicken rice, sweet & spicy bone marrow soup, a shark fin dish, and spicy crab. Tony dines in a medical themed restaurant.
43	4–02	"Berlin"	January 14, 2008
Tony visits Berlin, Germany, and gets introduced to the city's Cold War past by a former British intelligence agent who stayed in Berlin.
44	4–03	"Vancouver, BC"	January 21, 2008
Tony visits Vancouver, British Columbia, Canada, and explores the city's restaurant culture with three chef friends: Pino Posteraro, Hidekazu Tojo, and Vikram Vij. He also attempts to ski at Whistler, visits with the video gaming developers at EA Canada, and films a small role in the Uwe Boll action movie Far Cry. He also meets up with Nari Kye again.
45	4–04	"Greek Islands"	January 28, 2008
Tony travels through the Greek Islands, from Crete to Zakynthos, in search of his own Odyssey. There, he tries sardines, sweetbread, lamb, snails, sea urchins and rakı. He also hunts, and eats, quail.
46	4–05	"New Orleans"	February 4, 2008
New Orleans, with emphasis on post-Katrina recovery, both by locals generally and by the local food industry in particular. Includes a visit with Emeril Lagasse, who is acknowledged in the episode as a favorite target of ridicule in Bourdain's early career. Local writer Chris Rose offers commentary on the city's conditions.
47	4–06	"London/Edinburgh"	February 11, 2008
Tony visits London, England, and Edinburgh, Scotland, and meets with local chefs and raconteurs, including chefs Fergus Henderson, Marco Pierre White and Tom Kitchin. He also records a spoken-word track with the band Morcheeba.
48	4–07	"Jamaica"	February 18, 2008
Tony visits Jamaica and meets a dancehall artist as well as a Rastafarian. He has an agonizing time on an eco tour through one of Jamaica's caves. Also, he learns about coffee and shares a traditional Jamaican Sunday dinner.
49	4–08	"Romania"	February 25, 2008
Tony visits Transylvania and Bucharest, Romania. He is accompanied by Zamir Gotta, who is celebrating his 50th birthday. Along the way, they learn about vampires, the communist regime, and the strong cultural history of Romania. They attend a tourist-oriented Dracula-themed Halloween dinner at a castle in Transylvania, which Tony hates.
50	4–09	"Hawaii"	March 3, 2008
Tony gets a taste of paradise as he visits the Hawaiian islands, from jet skiing on the North Shore, to a visit to Kīlauea, the world's most active volcano. He learns all about the diverse use of SPAM in Hawaiian cuisine and participates in a luau and is enjoying it.
51	4–10	"Into the Fire NY"	March 10, 2008
Tony and his friend, renowned chef Éric Ripert, spend a night as line cooks at Tony's old restaurant of Brasserie Les Halles in New York City to see if they still have the skills necessary to work in a restaurant.
52	4–11	"Laos"	July 7, 2008
Tony travels to Vientiane, Laos, where he meets a man who was a victim of an unexploded American bomb and takes part in a Baci ceremony.
53	4–12	"Colombia"	July 14, 2008
Tony visits the cities of Medellín and Cartagena in Colombia, and learns about its tragic past as a drug capital, as well as its more hopeful future.
54	4–13	"Saudi Arabia"	July 21, 2008
In a special episode of No Reservations, the show ran a "FANatic contest", in which viewers were asked to submit a tape nominating their home town or country as a destination for a future episode of the show. The winner of the contest was Danya Alhamrani, and in this episode, Bourdain and crew visit her hometown of Jeddah, Saudi Arabia.
55	4–14	"Uruguay"	July 28, 2008
Tony travels to Uruguay with his brother to research their roots after learning that they have family connections there. They enjoy chivitos, and other local specialties.
56	4–15	"U.S. Southwest"	August 4, 2008
Tony travels through the US states of California, Arizona, New Mexico and Texas. In Phoenix, Arizona, Tony meets with rock legend Alice Cooper at Cooper's restaurant. In Texas, he shoots machine guns and dines with another rock legend, Ted Nugent.
57	4–16	"Tokyo"	August 11, 2008
Tony jets to Tokyo, Japan, to look for a perfect piece of sushi and a perfect knife blade. He enjoys soba, yakitori, and designer cocktail drinks. He meets up with famed chef Masaharu Morimoto and tries to learn the martial art of kendo and the subtleties of Japanese flower arranging known as ikebana.
58	4–17	"Spain"	August 18, 2008
Tony re-visits Spain (Barcelona and the northern region of Spain,) which he calls the most important food destination in the world. He visits the test kitchen of pastry chef Albert Adrià, Ferran's brother, and the factory of pioneering chocolate maker Enric Rovira. At a farm, he enjoys roasted calçots during a "calçotada". He has bar tapas with chefs Juan Mari Arzak and his daughter, Elena, of the restaurant Arzak, in San Sebastián. He eats at the molecular gastronomy restaurant Mugaritz, the grill-based restaurant Etxebarri, and Arzak.
59	4–18	"Egypt"	August 25, 2008
Tony is determined to avoid doing the "tourist thing" and visiting the Egyptian pyramids, but rather explore what it means to be Egyptian; to spending an evening at a men's cafe smoking Shisha, to a boat ride down the Nile and spending time in the desert with a group of Bedouin men.
60	4–19	"So Long, Summer"	September 1, 2008
In honor of Labor Day, Tony throws a backyard and poolside barbecue for his production crew as they reminisce about shows gone by, from its interesting guests to scenes never broadcast on domestic (North American) television. Nari Kye appears in this episode.
61	Special	"At the Table with Anthony Bourdain"	October 20, 2008
Bourdain with guests Amy Sacco, Bill Buford, Ted Allen and Chris Wilson dine at NYC restaurant wd~50 and discuss various topics related to food and restaurants.

=== Season 5 ===
Season 5 is another split season, with 10 episodes aired in the winter of 2009, and 10 episodes following in the summer.

No. overall	No. in season	Title	Original release date
62	5–01	"Mexico"	January 5, 2009
Tony travels to Mexico with Carlos, the Mexican executive chef of Les Halles, and the two visit Puebla, Carlos's home town, and Mexico City. Tony eats Mexican foods like tortillas and roast pork and drinks pulque, an alcoholic beverage. He also attends a lucha libre school.
63	5–02	"Venice"	January 12, 2009
Tony goes in search of the less-touristy side of Venice, Italy, and meets locals and enjoys deep-fried crabs, baccalà and boiled calves' heads.
64	5–03	"Washington, D.C."	January 19, 2009
Tony visits Washington, D.C. and explores the diversity of its culinary options, including Irish, Mexican and Ethiopian food, as well as local landmark Ben's Chili Bowl. He visits the International Spy Museum and practices one espionage technique, the dead drop. He then meets up with renowned chef and restaurateur José Andrés for a tour of a Penn Quarter market and Andrés famed minibar.
65	5–04	"Azores"	January 26, 2009
After years of working alongside Azorean Portuguese immigrants in his early cooking career in New England, Tony travels to the Portuguese islands of the Azores. There, he visits a boiling geyser., and island hops to find out how the history, the region, and the food, all shaped and molded, the people with Azorean heritage of New England.
66	5–05	"Chicago"	February 2, 2009
Tony visits Chicago and samples local favorites like sausages, Chicago-style hot dog, and Burt Katz's deep-dish pizza, as well as upscale dining. He also enjoys a giant "Three Little Piggies" sandwich with radio personality Mancow Muller.
67	5–06	"Food Porn"	February 9, 2009
The episode shows various clips from previous shows of appetizing-looking meals. It also includes new footage of various chefs talking about food, including an extended conversation between Bourdain and chef David Chang while they eat at Chang's restaurant Momofuku Ssäm Bar.
68	5–07	"Philippines"	February 16, 2009
Tony visits Manila, Pampanga, and Cebu in the Philippines, traveling around with one of the runners-up of his "FANatic" contest, Augusto Elefano, to figure out "just who are the Filipino people". After tasting Cebu's famous lechon, he deems it the "best pig ever."
69	5–08	"Disappearing Manhattan"	February 23, 2009
Tony visits old establishments in Manhattan that are becoming a rarity in the city. He visits several old food stores in Hell's Kitchen with chef Michael Lomonaco, Keens Steakhouse with food writer Joshua Ozersky, Russ & Daughters and Katz's Delicatessen with novelist Joel Rose, Eisenberg's Sandwich and some of the German establishments in the Yorkville neighborhood with tour guide "Famous Fat Dave", Hop Kee in Chinatown with chef Chris Cheung, Le Veau d'Or with food writer Michael Batterberry, and dive bar Sophie's with writer Nick Tosches.
70	5–09	"Sri Lanka"	March 2, 2009
Tony visits Colombo, Sri Lanka, samples the local food, and discusses the aftermath of the Sri Lankan Civil War and the 2004 tsunami.
71	5–10	"Vietnam: There's No Place Like Home"	March 9, 2009
Tony visits Vietnam, accompanied by his former boss, Les Halles owner Philippe Lajaunie. He is there to pay his respects to the family of Madame Ngoc, an old friend and restaurateur whose kindness and warmth touched Tony during his past visits. He visits the countryside, street markets and newly upscale areas of Ho Chi Minh City. At the end of the episode, he considers moving there.
72	5–11	"Chile"	July 13, 2009
Tony visits Santiago and Patagonia in Chile. He attends a Chilean rodeo event and enjoys sopaipillas and beef braised in wine.
73	5–12	"Australia"	July 20, 2009
Tony visits Melbourne, Australia, and samples food from the city's diverse ethnic communities as well as at high-end restaurants. He also learns how to play trugo.
74	5–13	"Rust Belt"	July 27, 2009
Tony visits the "Rust Belt" cities of Baltimore; Detroit, and Buffalo, New York, accompanied by Zamir Gotta. In Baltimore they meet with several of the cast members of the television show The Wire. In Buffalo they meet one of the other runners-up of the "FANatic" contest, Nelson Starr, and see his rock band perform. Zamir is discovered to have become a celebrity in the US in his own right, as a result of his previous No Reservations appearances.
75	5–14	"Down on the Street"	August 3, 2009
A collection of street food clips from past shows, mostly in Asia.
76	5–15	"San Francisco"	August 10, 2009
Tony's adventures takes him to the city of San Francisco, a city of districts and contradictions. So paying an homage to Steve McQueen's iconic 1968 film Bullitt; Tony takes his rented Ford Mustang through the streets of San Francisco, from Fisherman's Wharf, to Haight-Ashbury, to Chinatown, and across the bridge into Oakland, California. Tony dines with poet August Kleinzahler, and then off to chef Chris Cosentino's restaurant for an offal tasting.
77	5–16	"Thailand"	August 17, 2009
Tony travels to Thailand and catches the beginning of the 2009 political unrest there. He also enjoys street food in Bangkok and explores Phuket. Later, Tony meets up with another runner-up of the "FANatic" contest, Eric Rivera, who is training for his Muay Thai fight.
78	5–17	"Montana"	August 24, 2009
Tony travels to the state of Montana in the United States, where he visits a ranch and learns the struggles of being a rancher. He eats local specialties like beef, pasty, trout, and buffalo. Tony gets an understanding of why fly fishing is so addictive and meets with writer and local legend Jim Harrison, and artist Russell Chatham.
79	5–18	"Burning Questions"	August 31, 2009
Tony answers the top 10 questions from viewers, submitted and voted on at the Travel Channel's website. His answers are illustrated with clips from the show.
80	5–19	"New York Outer Boroughs"	September 7, 2009
Tony visits the "outer boroughs" of New York City: Staten Island, Queens, Brooklyn and The Bronx. In Staten Island, Tony meets with musical pioneer David Johansen at a tiki bar. He visits ethnic Queens restaurants with chefs David Chang and Chris Cheung.
81	5–20	"Sardinia"	September 14, 2009
Bourdain travels with his wife, Ottavia Busia, to her ancestral home of Sardinia, Italy.

=== Season 6 ===
No. overall	No. in season	Title	Original release date
82	6–01	"Panama"	January 11, 2010
Tony visits Panama, including a trip to Manuel Noriega's old house, and a trip into the rainforest, where he meets some local tribespeople. He also watches as the police set fire to a multi-million-dollar seized stash of cocaine.
83	6–02	"Istanbul"	January 18, 2010
Tony visits Istanbul, Turkey, and samples lahmacun, doner kebab, islak burger, midye dolma, börek and rakı. He also visits the Blue Mosque.
84	6–03	"Brittany"	January 25, 2010
Tony travels to Brittany, France and enjoys some of the local specialties, like crepes, cider and oysters.
85	6–04	"Prague"	February 1, 2010
Tony enjoys the old-world charms of Prague in the Czech Republic, and travels with local Michelin-awarded chef Zdeněk Pohlreich.
86	6–05	"Hudson Valley, NY"	February 8, 2010
Tony visits cities in Hudson Valley in his home state of New York State, accompanied at times by food writer Michael Ruhlman. He enjoys local crabs, visits his alma mater The Culinary Institute of America and Mohonk Mountain House, and has lunch with actor Bill Murray in Yonkers. He also meets his biggest challenge yet, the 10-year-old daughter of Michael Pardus, Sierra.
87	6–06	"Ecuador"	March 1, 2010
Tony visits Ecuador's Andean capital Quito to try some street food and local soups. He tries guinea pig in Sangolquí. Then he goes to the coast of Ecuador to try local seafood in Puerto López, Salango, Montañita, and Manglaralto. Finally he tries some local stews in Guayaquil and experiences a crab party.
88	6–07	"Obsessed"	March 8, 2010
Anthony talks to chefs and bloggers whose obsessive love for food drives them to noteworthy feats.
89	6–08	"Harbin, China"	March 15, 2010
Tony visits the city of Harbin in northeastern China and experiences the mix of Chinese and Russian cultures there. He also visits an eccentric local entrepreneur who enjoys karaoke and all things American.
90	6–09	"Provence"	March 22, 2010
Tony and crew stay at a villa in Provence, France, and Tony tries daube, aioli, terrine and Ricard Pastis, and plays pétanque. He then attempts to cook a provençal meal for some of the locals.
91	6–10	"Vietnam: Central Highlands"	March 29, 2010
Tony returns to Vietnam to explore the Central Highlands. His stops include the cities of Da Lat and Hanoi. Tony learns about the French history of region, and the former emperor Bảo Đại. Tony tries more woodland creatures like Java mouse-deer; eats a Hanoi delicacy, fried giant water bugs and water bugs extract; and teaches his friends the difference between wine and liquor.
92	6–11	"Techniques Special"	April 5, 2010
Bourdain and various chefs illustrate basic cooking techniques.
93	6–12	"Maine"	April 12, 2010
Tony travels to Maine, guided by one of his cameramen, Maine native Zach Zamboni.
94	6–13	"Food Porn 2"	April 19, 2010
Like the first "Food Porn" episode, this episode features a mix of previous clips and new footage. The episode is introduced by porn actor Ron Jeremy.
95	6–14	"Caribbean Island Hopping"	July 5, 2010
Tony visits St. Vincent and the Grenadines. He meets with chef Norman van Aken, a fusion pioneer, and they visit the Tobago Cays. He also participates in an opossum hunt and eats the resulting stew. He goes scuba diving and eats at a cafeteria-style restaurant in the capital city, Kingstown.
96	6–15	"US Heartland"	July 12, 2010
While on a speaking tour through the United States, Tony visits the cities Livonia, Michigan, Columbus, Ohio, Minneapolis, Denver, Austin and Milwaukee and searches out high-end and innovative dining to counter a perception some have that the middle of the United States represents a culinary wasteland.
97	6–16	"Liberia"	July 19, 2010
Tony finds signs of optimism in Liberian society following its civil wars of the late 1990s and early 2000s. He meets with an immigrant living in Staten Island, and his son who remained in Liberia.
98	6–17	"Kerala, India"	July 26, 2010
Tony visits the state of Kerala in India, where he enjoys the local cuisine, such as Malabar Matthi Curry, and meets Indian film star Mammootty on the set of the film Pokkiri Raja.
99	6–18	"Where It All Began"	August 2, 2010
Tony introduces footage taken by a documentary crew who were filming Bourdain in 2001 immediately after the publishing success of his book Kitchen Confidential: Adventures in the Culinary Underbelly.
100	6–19	"Dubai"	August 9, 2010
Tony visits Dubai and samples some of the local highlights, including fine dining and the indoor ski resort Ski Dubai. He also meets and eats with some of the locals, including young sheiks and foreign workers.
101	6–20	"Rome"	August 16, 2010
Tony visits Rome, Italy and meets artisans of pasta, cheese and other local specialties. The episode was filmed entirely in black and white and is intended as an homage to Federico Fellini's films, especially La Dolce Vita.
102	6–21	"Back to Beirut"	August 23, 2010
Tony and crew return to Beirut after their last attempt was derailed by the 2006 Lebanon War.
103	6–22	"Making of India"	August 30, 2010
The Zero Point Zero crew's behind-the-scenes look at the making of the Kerala episode
104	6–23	"What Were We Thinking Special"	September 6, 2010
Tony and the crew of No Reservations discuss the making of the show, from its beginning to the present.
105	6–24	"100th Episode - Paris"	September 6, 2010
For the 100th episode, Tony travels to Paris and meets with Éric Ripert and various local chefs, and they discuss the past and future of French cooking.
106	6–25	"Madrid"	September 13, 2010
Tony visits Madrid, Spain, and enjoys local delicacies like jamón ibérico and black pudding.
107	6–26	"Holiday Special"	December 6, 2010
Tony and his friends plan a huge potluck holiday dinner. The episode includes holiday-inspired music videos from the band Das Racist.

=== Season 7 ===
No. overall	No. in season	Title	Original release date
108	7–01	"Haiti"	February 28, 2011
Tony visits Haiti, a country still recovering from the 2010 earthquake and dealing with a cholera epidemic in and an impending hurricane. He visits a relief camp run by Sean Penn's J/P Haitian Relief Organization.
109	7–02	"Cambodia"	March 7, 2011
Tony seeks to reconnect with the historically rich country of Cambodia. While sampling local seafood, Tony sits down with politicians to discuss the country's difficult Khmer Rouge past.
110	7–03	"Nicaragua"	March 14, 2011
Tony visits Nicaragua to sample the cuisine, and in the process examines the cultural extremes in the country.
111	7–04	"Vienna"	March 21, 2011
Tony visits wintery Vienna, Austria, visits Christmas markets, goes hunting suited like an aristocrat, eats sphincter and has, surprisingly, an overall good time. Tony finds out who Krampus is.
112	7–05	"Ozarks"	March 28, 2011
Tony visits West Plains, Missouri, backdrop of the book and film Winter's Bone, and eats at Fred and Red's. There, Tony explores the Ozark region and samples local specialties such as raccoon, venison and squirrel pot pie. He also goes fishing with novelist Daniel Woodrell, who breaks his shoulder on film.
113	7–06	"Brazil (the Amazon)"	April 11, 2011
Tony visits the city of Belém and the Amazon Rainforest in Brazil,
114	7–07	"Boston"	April 18, 2011
Tony visits the South Boston section of Boston, the neighborhood known as "Southie", accompanied by guitarist Mike Ruffino of The Unband. They enjoy the local cuisine and bars and meet with local celebrities like columnist and talk-show host Howie Carr.
115	7–08	"Japan: Hokkaido"	April 25, 2011
Weeks before the March 2011 quake, Tony visits Hokkaido, Japan. In Sapporo, he tries Hokkaido style ramen, waikanae crab, and Uni-ikura Don (salmon roe & sea urchin over rice). He visits with the indigenous people of Hokkaido, the Ainu. Tony ends his trip dining at a ryokan enjoying a formal robatayaki. In the international edition, viewers saw Tony visit the Sapporo Beer Garden for the “Genghis Khan” which is a specialty of Hokkaido.
116	7–09	"Cuba"	July 11, 2011
Tony travels to Cuba in the search of the island's heart and soul where beauty abounds in the people, the food and the architecture and streets that are riddled with cars from before the revolution.
117	7–10	"Macau"	July 18, 2011
Tony visits Macau, a former Portuguese colony south of Hong Kong now known as the "Vegas of Asia", and tries his hand at some casino games. He also visits the Macau Tower bungee jump, the largest in the world, and takes the ultimate plunge.
118	7–11	"Naples"	July 25, 2011
Tony travels to Naples, Italy, considered to be the root of Italian-American cuisine, to find out the differences and similarities between the original and its American counterpart.
119	7–12	"El Bulli"	August 1, 2011
Tony and José Andrés visit El Bulli, a renowned restaurant in Spain, and dine with chef Ferran Adrià. Tony works on the line.
120	7–13	"US Desert"	August 8, 2011
Tony explores the Mojave Desert of southern California with Josh Homme of Queens of the Stone Age.
121	7–14	"Ukraine"	August 15, 2011
Tony and Zamir travel through the abandoned city of Chernobyl in Ukraine, site of a nuclear accident 25 years earlier. They then travel elsewhere in Ukraine including the Crimea and sample local food like green borscht.
122	7–15	"Kurdistan"	August 22, 2011
Tony and his crew venture to the war zone of Iraqi Kurdistan, as well as Turkish Kurdistan, to explore the tragic history and hopeful future of the Kurds.
123	7–16	"Cajun Country"	August 29, 2011
Tony goes to New Orleans and meets with some of the crew of TV show Treme. He then continues west into the bayou and Cajun country.
124	Special	"Holiday Special 2011"	December 12, 2011
Tony's Christmas takes a turn towards the bizarre. Norah Jones sings, Tony seeks answers from chef Dave Arnold and cooks with Lidia Bastianich and Christopher Walken, and Samantha Brown shoots a gun.

=== Season 8 ===
No. overall	No. in season	Title	Original release date
125	8–01	"Mozambique"	April 9, 2012
Tony travels to Mozambique and finds himself in a mysterious, post-colonial Africa. From Portuguese ruins on Mozambique Island to the vibrant metropolis of Maputo, Mozambique doesn't look like anywhere Tony has been so far.
126	8–02	"Kansas City"	April 16, 2012
Tony travels to Kansas City, the BBQ capital of the world, with pal Zamir Gotta, in search of the best barbecue. While there, Tony meets up with musicians Dan and Patrick of The Black Keys for some serious finger licking meat. Zamir has his own adventures, visiting Leila's Hair Museum and attending his first-ever tailgate party.
127	8–03	"Croatian Coast"	April 23, 2012
Tony visits the Croatian coast to swim with bluefin tuna and hunt for a prized white truffle. He literally gets knocked off his feet as he is treated to the finest Mediterranean cuisine.
128	8–04	"Lisbon"	April 30, 2012
Once the center of the richest empire in Europe, Lisbon now faces one of the worst financial crises in the EU. But even as it struggles with rising debt and unemployment, Tony finds out that Lisbon is experiencing a cultural and culinary renaissance. Tony shares a meal and Fado performance with writer António Lobo Antunes. The music of Dead Combo is used throughout the episode and the band is featured in the episode as well, eating at a restaurant specialising in gourmet canned fish.
129	8–05	"Japan: Cook It Raw"	May 7, 2012
Tony heads to Japan for the gastronomic event that is "Cook it Raw", which brings together some of the best chefs in the world to forage for local ingredients and serve the results to culinary experts.
130	8–06	"Finland"	May 14, 2012
Heeding the calls of his Finnish Facebook fans, Tony takes a trip to Helsinki, Finland. He joins musician Sami Yaffa for a liquored-up tour of the world's only pub tram, a bloody sauna and an unexpectedly exciting dinner with a cabbie's mother.
131	8–07	"Baja"	May 28, 2012
Tony travels to the Baja Peninsula and Tijuana, Mexico.
132	8–08	"Penang"	June 4, 2012
Tony travels to Penang, Malaysia, where he experiences the local food including Asam Laksa and typical Nyonya dishes.

=== Season 9 ===
After Bourdain announced in May 2012 that he would be leaving to do a new show for CNN entitled Anthony Bourdain: Parts Unknown, the Travel Channel suspended Season 8 and repackaged the remaining seven episodes left to air as "The Final Tour" to capitalize on the publicity surrounding his departure. In addition to the seven episodes from Season 8, three episodes — "Sex, Drugs And Rock & Roll", "Seven Deadly Sins" and "Off The Charts" — made out of old footage, were reedited to look like new and added to Season 9.

No. overall	No. in season	Title	Original release date
133	9–01	"Austin"	September 3, 2012
Tony visits Austin, Texas during the annual South by Southwest music festival and discovers that today's indie rockers and hipsters are often foodies as well. He hangs out with the band Sleigh Bells for a seafood boil, and has Mexican food with Neon Indian and Alejandro Escovedo.
134	9–02	"Sydney"	September 10, 2012
Tony travels to Sydney, Australia. Tony dives with sharks at Oceanworld Manly in Sydney, visits the sheep farms of the Blue Mountains and the chic innovative restaurants of the big city, samples fresh seafood, old school charcuterie, and the ubiquitous Australian barbie.
135	9–03	"Sex, Drugs And Rock & Roll"	September 17, 2012
In this special episode Tony dives into the aspects of Sex, Drugs and Rock & Roll. The episode includes new footage of Tony at a recording session at music studio Rancho De La Luna with rocker Josh Homme, as well as old footage including clips from the "food porn" episodes, hanging out with members of the bands The Black Keys and The Unband, burning cocaine with the police in Panama, and eating a "happy" (marijuana-laced) pizza in Cambodia.
136	9–04	"Emilia Romagna"	September 24, 2012
Tony travels to the Emilia-Romagna region of Northern Italy with American expat chef Michael White. Tony races a Ferrari around the Autodromo Enzo e Dino Ferrari racing circuit in nearby Imola.
137	9–05	"Burgundy"	October 1, 2012
Tony travels to Burgundy, France with chef Ludo Lefebvre.
138	9–06	"Seven Deadly Sins"	October 8, 2012
Old clips from the show are used to show examples of the seven deadly sins. The episode includes several new animated segments, featuring Tony, Zamir and others.
139	9–07	"Rio"	October 15, 2012
Tony travels to Rio de Janeiro.
140	9–08	"Off The Charts"	October 22, 2012
Tony narrates clips from previous shows, showing some of the most bizarre situations that he and the No Reservations crew got into. Clips include crisis training that the crew got before their trip to Iraqi Kurdistan, civil unrest in Bangkok, Tony and Zamir's trip through Chernobyl, a mass grave in Port-au-Prince, and a ridiculous Halloween dinner in Transylvania.
141	9–09	"Dominican Republic"	October 29, 2012
Nearing toward the end of his final tour, Anthony Bourdain travels to the Caribbean for fresh fish and more in the Dominican Republic.
142	9–10	"Brooklyn"	November 5, 2012
Tony visits Brooklyn the hometown of one of his fellow travel channel colleagues Adam Richman host of Man v. Food with actor Michael K. Williams, best known from The Wire. He once again meets up with his companion Zamir Gotta.

=== Related ===
Title	Airdate
"No Reservations: Iceland: Special Edition"	March 20, 2006
Bourdain and show producer Chris Collins re-view Season 1's "Iceland" episode with DVD-style behind-the-scenes commentary.
"What's Your Trip with Anthony Bourdain"	May 21, 2007
Pilot episode for a proposed new series with Bourdain presenting travel videos submitted by viewers.

== Production ==
When visiting a location for the show, Bourdain generally travels with an assistant producer and three camera operators, who on average record forty-five to seventy-five hours of footage in total. They usually do not employ a boom operator or sound mixer, and episodes are generally unscripted. Bourdain has likened the general atmosphere of the crew to a music group: "I like to say we're like a band, perpetually on the road, a small crew of five very close friends with tiny little cameras".

== Distribution ==
=== Home video releases ===
As of March 2013, Travel Channel has released seven collections of the series on DVD. Despite that the series has been shot mostly with high-definition video cameras, it is not available for purchase in high definition format like Blu-ray.

In March 2013, Netflix canceled instant streaming of the show without explanation, but restored a 25 episode "No Reservations Collection" in October 2014. Hulu offers 5 episodes from season 7 and 8

The DVD releases do not have subtitles enabled for the hearing impaired. (Broadcast episodes do have closed-captioning available.)

- Collection 1 (4 discs) (2005)
  - Disc 1- Paris, New Jersey
  - Disc 2- Sicily, Las Vegas
  - Disc 3- New Zealand, Malaysia
  - Disc 4- Iceland, Vietnam
- Collection 2 (3 discs) (2006)
  - Disc 1- Sweden, Puerto Rico, Quebec, U.S./Mexico Border
  - Disc 2- India (Rajasthan), India (Kolkata/Mumbai), Korea, Indonesia, Ireland
  - Disc 3- Ghana, Namibia, Lebanon, Pacific Northwest
- Collection 3 (3 discs) (2007)
  - Disc 1- Russia, Los Angeles, New York, Shanghai, Hong Kong
  - Disc 2- French Polynesia, Cleveland, Brazil, Argentina
  - Disc 3- Singapore, South Carolina, Berlin, Tuscany
- Collection 4 (3 discs) (2008)
  - Disc 1- Vancouver, New Orleans, London/Edinburgh, Greek Islands, Jamaica, Hawaii
  - Disc 2- Into the Fire, Laos, Tokyo, Uruguay, Colombia
  - Disc 3- Spain, Egypt, Saudi Arabia, Washington D.C., US Southwest, Bonus Features
- Collection 5 - Part 1 (3 discs) (2010)
  - Disc 1- Romania, So Long Summer, Mexico, Venice
  - Disc 2- Azores, Chicago, Food Porn, Philippines
  - Disc 3- Disappearing Manhattan, Sri Lanka, Sardinia, Chile, Bonus Materials (Alternate Universe)
- Collection 5 - Part 2 (3 discs) (2011)
  - Disc 1- Australia, Buffalo/Baltimore/Detroit, Down on the Street, San Francisco
  - Disc 2- Thailand, Montana, NYC Outer Boroughs, Vietnam: No Place Like Home
  - Disc 3- Brittany, Obsessed, Provence, Bonus Materials (Alternate Universe)
- Collection 6 - Part 1 (3 discs) (November 29, 2011)
  - Disc 1- Panama, Istanbul, Prague, New York Hudson Valley, Ecuador
  - Disc 2- Harbin China, Maine, Food Porn 2, Caribbean Island Hopping, Heartland
  - Disc 3- Bonus Features: Burning Questions, Techniques Special, Holiday Special
- Collection 6 - Part 2 (2 discs) (2012)
  - Disc 1- Where it all Began, Liberia, Dubai, Rome, Madrid
  - Disc 2- Kerala, India, Paris 100, Back to Beirut, Bonus Features (What were we thinking, Making of India)
- Collection 7 (3 discs) (2012)
  - Disc 1- Haiti, Cambodia, Nicaragua, Vienna, Ozarks
  - Disc 2- Brazil: The Amazon, Boston, Japan: Hokkaido, Cuba, Macau
  - Disc 3- Naples, El Bulli, Ukraine, Kurdistan, Cajun Country

=== Broadcast syndication ===
In 2019, Ovation obtained broadcast and digital rights in the United States for seasons five through eight of the series, while season 9 has been released exclusively on the network's lifestyle and travel streaming service JOURNY and has yet to be aired on TV.

=== Online streaming and distribution ===
As of August 2024, No Reservations is now available on multiple FAST (Free Ad-Supported STreaming) platforms as a dedicated linear streaming channel thru a new distribution agreement via Warner Bros. Discovery. The channel runs No Reservations episodes on a daily rolling basis, as well as episodes of successor series The Layover (TV series) and Anthony Bourdain: Parts Unknown in non-specific blocks. Selected episodes of No Reservations are also available for purchase on YouTube The complete library is available on a subscription basis thru Discovery+ and complete seasons can also be purchased thru Amazon's Prime Video service, except for Season 8.

== Awards and nominations ==
Year	Award	Category	Nominated work	Result	Ref.
2008	American Cinema Editors Awards	Best Edited Reality Series	Eric Lasby (for "New Orleans")	Nominated	
2009	Primetime Creative Arts Emmy Awards	Outstanding Documentary or Nonfiction Series	Myleeta Aga, Christopher Collins, Lydia Tenaglia, Paul Cabana	Nominated	
2009	Primetime Creative Arts Emmy Awards	Outstanding Cinematography for a Nonfiction Program	Todd Liebler and Zach Zamboni (for "Laos")	Won	
2009	Primetime Creative Arts Emmy Awards	Outstanding Picture Editing for a Nonfiction Program	Jesse Fisher (for "Laos")	Nominated	
2010	Producers Guild of America Awards	Best Non-Fiction Television	Anthony Bourdain: No Reservations	Nominated	
2010	Primetime Creative Arts Emmy Awards	Outstanding Writing for a Nonfiction Programming	Anthony Bourdain (for "Prague")	Nominated	
2011	American Cinema Editors Awards	Best Edited Reality Series	Eric Lasby (for "Haiti")	Won	
2011	Primetime Creative Arts Emmy Awards	Outstanding Documentary or Nonfiction Series	Lydia Tenaglia, Christopher Collins, Anthony Bourdain, Stone Roberts	Nominated	
2011	Primetime Creative Arts Emmy Awards	Outstanding Cinematography for a Nonfiction Program	Todd Liebler and Zach Zamboni (for "Haiti")	Won	
2011	Primetime Creative Arts Emmy Awards	Outstanding Picture Editing for a Nonfiction Program	Eric Lasby (for "Haiti")	Nominated	
2011	Primetime Creative Arts Emmy Awards	Outstanding Writing for a Nonfiction Programming	Anthony Bourdain (for "Haiti")	Nominated	
2011	Producers Guild of America Awards	Best Non-Fiction Television	Anthony Bourdain: No Reservations	Nominated	
2011	TCA Awards	Outstanding Achievement in Reality Programming	Anthony Bourdain: No Reservations	Nominated	
2012	Critics' Choice Television Awards	2nd Critics' Choice Television Awards	Anthony Bourdain: No Reservations	Nominated	
2012	Producers Guild of America Awards	Best Non-Fiction Television	Anthony Bourdain: No Reservations	Nominated	
2012	Primetime Creative Arts Emmy Awards	Outstanding Documentary or Nonfiction Series	Christopher Collins, Lydia Tenaglia, Anthony Bourdain, Sandra Zweig, Stone Roberts, Tom Vitale	Nominated	
2012	Primetime Creative Arts Emmy Awards	Outstanding Cinematography for a Nonfiction Program	Todd Liebler and Zach Zamboni (for "Mozambique")	Won	
2012	Primetime Creative Arts Emmy Awards	Outstanding Picture Editing for a Nonfiction Program	Nick Brigden (for "U.S. Desert")	Nominated	
2012	Primetime Creative Arts Emmy Awards	Outstanding Writing for a Nonfiction Programming	Anthony Bourdain (for "Cuba")	Nominated	

== Book ==
No Reservations: Around the World on an Empty Stomach
- Author: Anthony Bourdain
- Language: English
- Genre: Travel/Television tie-in
- Publisher: Bloomsbury USA
- Publication date: October 30, 2007
- Publication place: United States
- Media type: Print (Hardback)
- Pages: 288
- ISBN: 0-06-171894-7
- Preceded by: The Nasty Bits
- Followed by: Medium Raw

No Reservations: Around the World on an Empty Stomach is a 2007 companion book to the show. Written by Bourdain, it serves as a scrap book of the previous three seasons of the television show and has extensive photographs of Bourdain and his crew at work filming the series.
