= Gotta =

Gotta may refer to:

- Jack Gotta (1929–2013), American-born Canadian football player, coach and manager
- Zamir Gotta, Russian film producer
- Gotta Barrage, on the Vamsadhara River, Odisha and Andhra Pradesh states, India
