= Trugo =

Croquet-like sport linked with Melbourne

- Highest governing body: Victorian Trugo Association
- First played: 1920s, Western Suburbs, Melbourne
- Clubs: 7

Characteristics
- Contact: No
- Team members: Various
- Mixed-sex: Yes
- Type: Outdoor, lawn rink
- Equipment: Mallet, rubber rings, goal posts, rubber plate, catcher

Presence
- Country or region: Victoria, Australia
- Olympic: No

Trugo, alternatively TruGo or True-Go, is an Australian sport where a rubber ring is struck with a mallet so that it passes between a set of posts. The game was developed in the western suburbs of Melbourne, Australia. The first trugo clubs were established in 1930s with the governing body of the sport, the Victorian Trugo Association (VTA), formed in 1940 by four clubs: Footscray, Yarraville, Newport and Williamstown.

The game was traditionally played by senior citizens over 60 years of age as it was conceived as a gentle game for pensioners to maintain social contact after retiring from employment. However, since the 1990s, the game has been progressively opened up to all ages and is now promoted as a cross generational sport.

At the start of the 2020 season, the principal trugo teams are Ascot Vale, Brunswick, Brunswick City, Footscray Doughnuts, Footscray Gumnuts, Port Melbourne, Sandridge, South Melbourne and Yarraville.

While the sport is rarely covered by the mainstream media, from time-to-time trugo has featured in reports covering its unique history and the quirky niche it occupies in Melbourne's sporting culture. For example, in January 2009 the sport was featured on the American TV travel show Anthony Bourdain: No Reservations and The Age in 2020 provided a video report describing the game as "Melbourne's own working-class sport".

== Play ==
Played outdoors on a grass court similar to that used for lawn bowls, courts measure 90 feet (27 meters) in length and 5 feet 9 inches (1.75 meters) wide. The object of the game is to score goals by striking a rubber ring one inch thick and thirteen inches in circumference with a mallet through a pair of short goal posts at the opposite end of the court. Rings are launched from a thick rubber plate and goal posts are hinged so that they fall if struck by the ring. When a post is struck it is judged a no-goal or 'poster' and no points are awarded. Behind the goal the player's opponent acts as a catcher using a canvas bag attached to a long pole to ensure the ring is safely contained. It is also the role of the catcher to call out the score for recording by both sides and to adjudicate any near goals.

Games may be played as singles, doubles, fours or eights. VTA premiership rounds are played as eights with four playing the first half and the remaining four playing the second half. Each player has three innings of four shots each before their opponents reply from the opposite end. At the end of the quarter, teams swap ends and play an additional three innings for a total of 24 shots per player. The team with the most goals at the end of the playing period is declared the winner.

The most common technique for striking the ring is called tunnelling: the player stands facing away from the goals, feet either side of the plate; the short-handled mallet is then swung between the player's legs to strike the ring. The less common technique, used in the early years and more common in the women's version of the game, is known as sideswiping. With sideswiping, the player stands to the side of the plate and strikes the ring with a long handled mallet similar to a croquet mallet.

== History ==
Trugo is said to have been inspired by the activities at the Newport Railway Workshops in the 1920s. According to tradition, workers knocked around discarded buffer rings from railway carriages in their spare time. In some versions of the story, the ring was hit along the aisle of a carriage with the goal being to shoot the ring out the end door without touching any of the seats. Alternatively, the buffer ring was said to have been struck along a piece of disused rail track either for distance or through makeshift goals. Either way, no source from this period has been found to support these oral traditions. Similarly, references to the length of the court being the length of a railway carriage or a span of track with the width of the goal posts being the width of the track, have not been substantiated. Some truth may yet be found in these stories but like the origins of many sports legend and myth prevail.

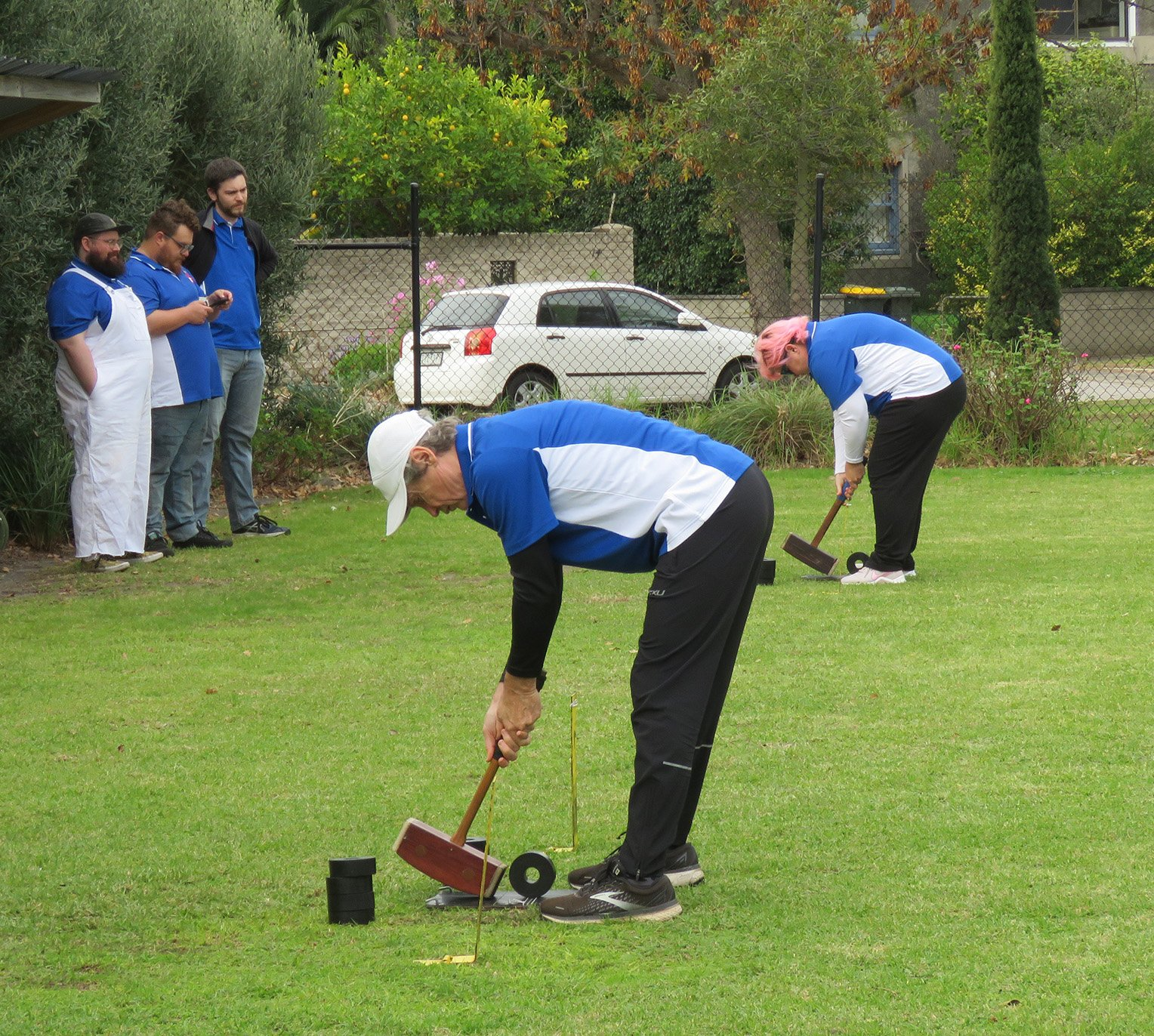
The Footscray Doughnuts in the 2022 Grand Final. Indicative of reforms to the sport over recent years the Doughnuts' players range in age from their 20s to their 60s and include both women and men.

The first historical references to the sport appear in the 1930s with the establishment of trugo clubs along the rail line between Footscray and Williamstown. The earliest of these clubs was Yarraville which was established in 1936 by a former railway worker Thomas Grieves and local engineer Claus Ebeling. Thomas Grieves is generally accredited as the inventor of the game taking it from railway workshops to the streets of Newport and then on to the Footscray flats just below the Yarraville Gardens by the late 1920s. However, it was not until 1937 that competitive matches began to be played with the first inter-club match held on the Western Oval in June of that year between Yarraville and the recently formed Footscray. Williamstown, established in 1938, and Newport, established in 1939, followed Footscray. These four teams then came together in 1940 and formed the Victorian Trugo Association.

While the War years were often disruptive to sports, trugo was far less affected and continued to develop. This was mainly because the sport focused on providing recreation for pensioners with the VTA setting 60 years as the minimum age for players. Trugo's emphasis on improving the quality of life for senior citizens aligned the sport with government programs promoting a similar focus. In 1940 the Victorian fitness director, Dr. A. Scholes praised the game and the Lord Mayor of Melbourne Frank Beaurepaire organised a demonstration in the Carlton Gardens for the National Fitness Council. This resulted in the setting up of the Carlton Trugo Club, the first of the non-Western suburban clubs.

By the late 1940s, early 1950s, clubs began to establish themselves outside of Melbourne with the strongest being in Shepparton, established in 1946, and across the border in Wagga Wagga, New South Wales, established in 1952. Generally, these were optimistic times for the sport but while new teams were added to the Melbourne competition there were also setbacks. Williamstown, one of the founding members of the VTA lost traction and by 1954 had disappeared from the competition with the Carlton Club experiencing a similar fate around the same time.

With increasing prosperity and greater security for the country's senior citizens, the 1960s proved a boon for pensioner sports in Australia and Trugo followed this trend. While it was never a rival for lawn bowls which was popular amongst a broad class of pensioners throughout Australia, Trugo celebrated its parochial nature and retained its unique position in Melbourne's working class suburbs. The 60s saw the number of trugo clubs expand but never too distant from the inner ring of Melbourne's older suburbs. Clubs in Coburg, Prahan, Preston, South Melbourne, Port Melbourne and Moonee Ponds now played alongside the founding inner-west teams of Newport, Yarraville and Footscray.

It is difficult to pinpoint when the downturn to trugo occurred, but by the end of the 1990s it appeared trugo had reached the peak of its popularity with 12 men's clubs and 6 women's clubs. Along with other pensioner sports such as lawn bowls, trugo went into decline in the 2000s in spite of the VTA taking steps to open the sport up to a wider age group. Initially, it dropped the age limit to 55 years old and then abolished it all together. In the 2000s, mixed gender teams also started to become the norm which allowed clubs to consolidate their membership. Women had established their own teams in the very early years of the sport with the first woman's team challenging a men's team in 1939. However, as the clubs became increasing stretched for administrators, club officials and players, women became an essential ingredient in keeping the sport going.

At first, these initiatives seemed to have had little impact on halting the overall demise of the game. In 2009, when Footscray, the second-oldest trugo club in the competition closed its doors, the fate of the sport appeared to be sealed. There was a sense it was just a matter of time before the other clubs would follow. Fortunately, this pessimism was not well founded. While Footscray may have withdrawn, there were still healthy clubs keen for the sport to continue. Brunswick, in particular, had managed to attract a younger cohort of players drawing on the rapidly changing suburb it represented. Yarraville, perhaps the club proudest of its history, also undertook a number of initiatives which included reaching out to schools and opening their courts up for community events. The final challenge to this pessimistic view was the rebirth of the Footscray Trugo Club in 2018. As early as 2015 concerns over the fate of the former Footscray Courts, the oldest extant trugo courts in the sport, was causing some residents to think of the possibility of reviving the club. Then, through a series of consultations between residents, local council and neighbouring Yarraville Club, Footscray re-established itself in time for the 2018–19 season. In a show of confidence the following season, the club entered a second team in the VTA competition, something its predecessor had only managed to do some decades back.

The sport is always likely to be at some risk of extinction given its limited geographical range, but there is a growing interest in the sport's connections to Victoria's railway history, the history of the inner West and to Victorian sport in general. Even amongst those Melburnians who do not play the sport, its continued presence is highly valued as a rare expression of local culture and not something they would like to lose.
