= Fred and Red's =

Historic restaurant in Missouri, USA

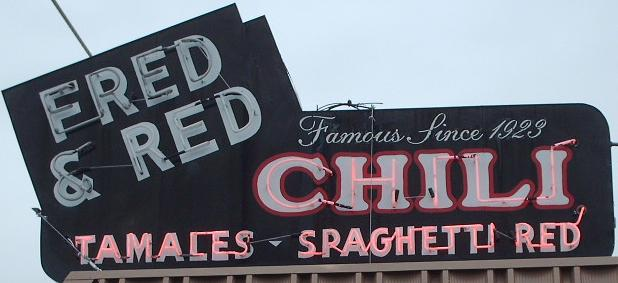
- Company type: Private
- Industry: Greasy spoon
- Founded: 1923 in Joplin, Missouri
- Headquarters: Joplin, Missouri, USA
- Area served: Missouri, Kansas, Arkansas, Oklahoma
- Key people: Fred Herring, Founder; William "Red" Wilcoxson, Founder; Larry Wilcoxson, second generation owner; David Schaefer, current owner
- Products: Chili, Spaghetti Red, Tamales
- Website: https://www.fredandredschili.com

Fred and Red's is a historic greasy spoon diner in Joplin, Missouri. The restaurant was started in 1923 and moved to its current location in 1943. The original arrangement and features have remained relatively unchanged through two generations of family ownership. The diner had been for sale for several years, but with no suitable offer, it closed on March 16, 2012, and the owner (Larry Wilcoxson) retired. Wilcoxson died in 2016, and the business was purchased from his heirs by David Schaefer, with plans to reopen the business in October 2016, but modernizing the building to get it current to department of health codes delayed the reopening until November 23, 2016.

== History ==
Fred Herring started a chili counter on Joplin's Main Street just 3 blocks south of what would become Route 66. The eatery catered to local blue-collar workers such as the area miners and in 1943 was moved seven blocks south to its current location, which happened to be across the street from the grocery store that supplied the meat for Herring's chili. According to a 1951 Joplin City Directory, the restaurant was known as Fred and Grover's. The butcher at the grocery store was William "Red" Wilcoxson, who bought half of Fred's business in 1956 to become his partner.

In 1973 Herring retired, turning his responsibilities over to Red's son and final owner Larry Wilcoxson, who worked at the restaurant from age 11. In 1975 Herring died, and Red Wilcoxson retired, and Larry ran the business himself until it closed, March 16, 2012. The Southwest Missouri eatery was a local landmark.

Schaefer, himself a long-time fan of the restaurant, reopened the store on November 23, 2016, and while keeping most of the business practices the same (including keeping prices the same from the day they closed in 2012), did modernize and update many items, detailed below in the "notable facts" below.

== Business description ==
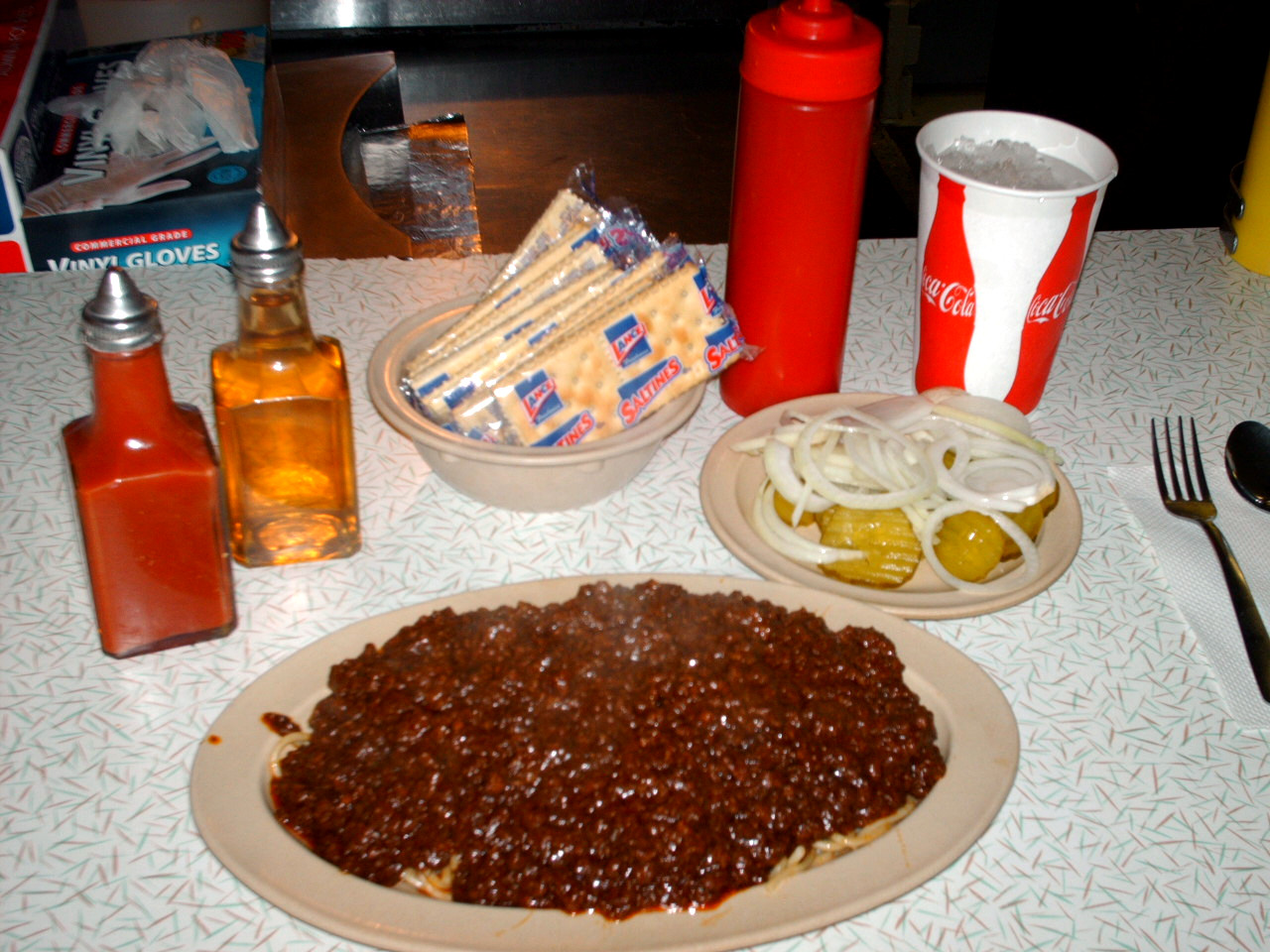
Fred and Red's Spaghetti Red dish

Fred and Red's was famous for their award-winning chili, tamales, and Spaghetti Red. They also served coneys, chili burgers, hamburgers, frito pie, and home-made fruit pies. Red Wilcoxson died in 2005, causing his son Larry to consider selling the business where he had worked since age 11, but with no suitable buyer being found, Wilcoxson decided to retire and discontinue the business. This decision was announced by his daughter on the Facebook fan page called "We Love Fred and Red's" on March 5, 2012.

With the announcement of the upcoming closing, demand grew dramatically, often greater than supply available. After two stressful weeks of working extra hours to keep up, Larry Wilcoxson decided to close sooner than the planned mid-April date previously communicated. The business closed its doors on March 16, 2012, around 5 PM. Wilcoxson was given the last serving of spaghetti red.

The restaurant has a distinctive "U-shaped" counter, 22 barstools, and a central serving area. One of the restaurant's unique features was a home-made tamale press created from scrap Ford Model T car parts and used to manually make 5400 tamales every week. The Health Department would not certify the tamale press for the 2016 reopening, so the tamales are now made by hand.

A local fan of the restaurant, Dan Daugherty, composed a poem in tribute to Fred and Red's, and for many years it was printed on the back of each guest check. A framed copy of the tribute is posted on the restaurant's wall.

The diner had no drive-thru window, no published phone number, and a smallish parking lot, but did a brisk carry-out business. There were frequently long lines waiting for one of the 22 barstools at the counter. Schaefer plans to add a drive through in the future, but it was not ready for the 2016 reopening.

== Notable facts ==
- Fred and Red's waitresses wore traditional all-white uniforms, calculated each order by hand as they were recorded on a paper "Guest Check" and impaled the orders on a spindle when paid; though prior to closing in 2012, the wait staff had changed to black t-shirts, and remain in black to this day.
- According to some of Fred and Red's older waitresses, Baseball Hall of Fame member Mickey Mantle was a frequent visitor during his life.
- As with many local favorites, Fred and Red's had quirky business rules: They are only open 5 days per week (closing on Sundays and Mondays), and 11 months out of the year, closing for the entire month of August each year for vacation. Despite these business practices, their customer base remained loyal. After the 2016 reopening, it is to remain open 6 days a week (Sundays), except for some major holidays.
- All transactions were cash only. Credit cards, debit cards, and checks were unwelcome, but debit and credit cards were accepted beginning in 2016.
- Fred and Red's had no phone, no internet site, and did not ship food through the 2012 closure. Today, the restaurant now publishes their phone number and accepts call-in orders. There are now a website and a facebook page.
- While he owned the restaurant, Larry Wilcoxson was the only person who knew the secret chili recipe, and he did all the cooking himself.
- The restaurant has a Facebook fan group that includes Wilcoxson's two daughters, who hold "officer" positions as "Chili Heirs". The fan group was referenced in a 2009 article in the Joplin Globe.
- The restaurant was featured on Anthony Bourdain: No Reservations in season 7, episode 5 entitled "The Ozarks"
- The restaurant has been immortalized as an HO scale Model Railroading kit marketed by Blair Line. The model pays homage to the Joplin store, but it does not resemble the building, and the backstory is fictitious.
