= Danya Alhamrani =

Saudi producer

Danya M. Alhamrani (born c. 1975) is an American-Saudi television director and producer. Alhamrani, along with her partner Dania Nassief, were the first women in Saudi Arabia to receive permission to own and manage a production company without a male business partner.

== Early life and education ==
Alhamrani was born in Bismarck, North Dakota, and raised in Bismarck and Jeddah, Saudi Arabia. She has an MA in TV and Film Production from San Diego State University.

== Career ==
Alhamrani worked on the Emmy Award winning television series The Short List.

In 2006 Alhamrani and her business partner Dania Nassief were the first women in Saudi Arabia to receive permission to own and manage a production company, Eggdancer Productions, without a male general manager.

In 2008 she starred along with Anthony Bourdain in an episode of Anthony Bourdain: No Reservations featuring Jeddah.

Alhamrani produced a 2002 short-form documentary in 2002 that explored non-Muslims following a Ramadan fast. She also produced The Straight Path, a film about a Saudi college student navigating work and religious obligations.

With Eggdancer Alhamrani produced a long-form documentary Rise: The Journey of Women in Saudi Arabia which details the evolution of the empowerment of women in the country starting with the 1950s when women first started receiving educations. The company also produced a pilot, Kalam Kabeer, which featured high school and college students discussing social issues. It produced a 2008 IMAX film, Journey to Mecca, about the Haj. In 2009 it produced a 30-episode television series, Akla wa Hikaya, exploring Saudi Arabian culture and traditional cuisine. It produced a 2018 documentary, A Silent Revolution:The Journey of Women in Saudi Arabia, which featured 25 Saudi women who pioneered women's rights in the country, including the first Saudi women Olympic athletes, the first national newspaper publisher, and other female leaders.

== Personal life ==
Alhamrani is married.
