= Chris Cheung =

Hong Kong media art artist

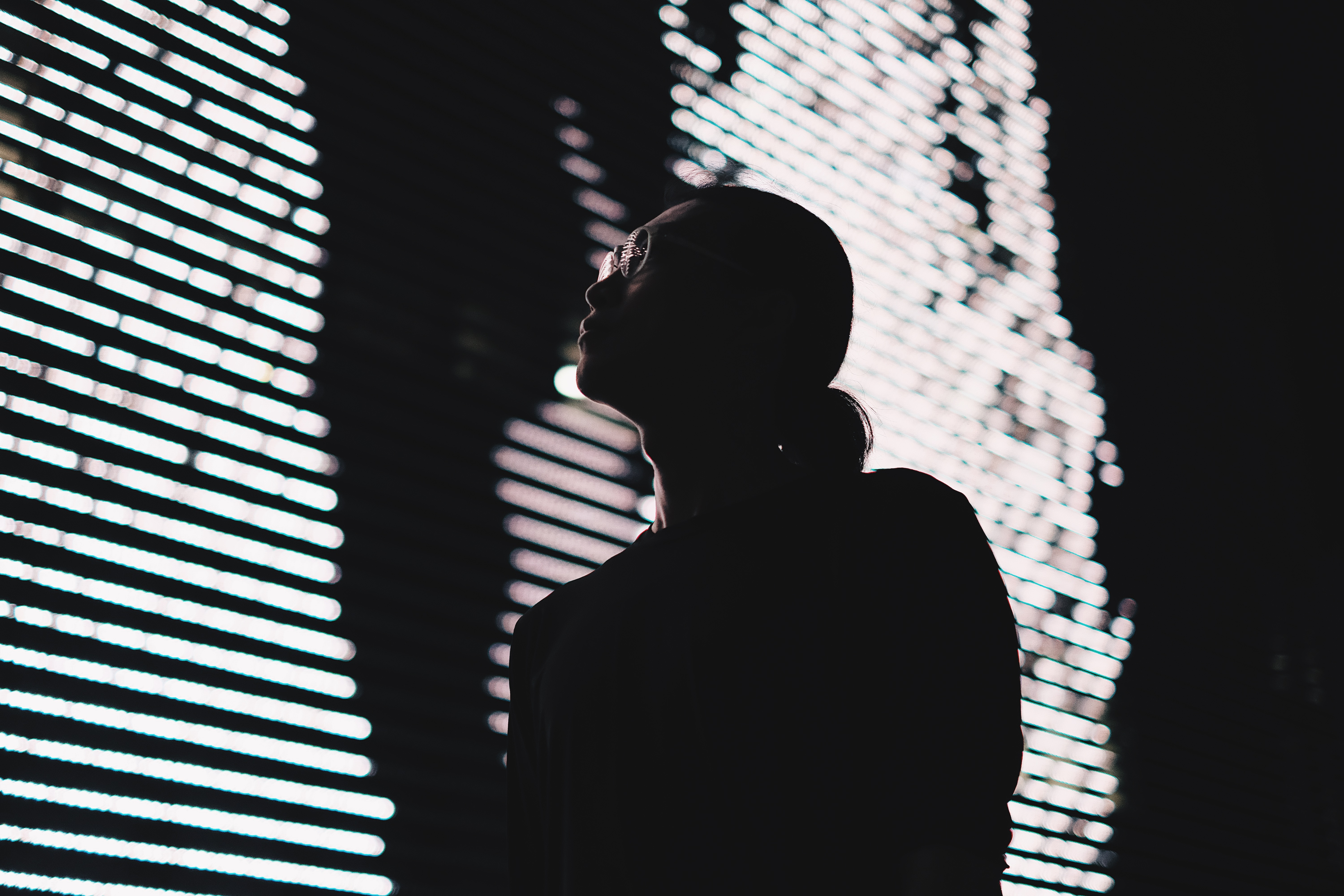
Chris Cheung and Ink | Pulse (2023) at M+ Museum.

Chris Cheung Hon Him (Chinese: 張瀚謙; b. 1983), also known as h0nh1m, is a Hong Kong new media artist, director and curator. Cheung is best known for installation art and audiovisual performances. His installations and audiovisual performances incorporate electronic, sound, visual, and creative technologies. In 2025, he was awarded Artist of the Year (Media Arts) at the 19th Hong Kong Arts Development Awards.

In 2007, Cheung founded the immersive-tech team, XEX, which was renamed XCEPT in 2017. In 2013, he founded the new media art team, XCEED. Their works have been showcased worldwide and won internationally renowned awards including the Red Dot, HKTDC, Frame, A' Design, Golden Pin, GDC 11, DFA Design for Asia awards, Lumen Prize and New York Art Director Club Young Guns 11. Afterwards, he established the innovation lab XPLOR and created a media art platform FutureTense.

== Education ==
Cheung graduated with a Bachelor's degree in Creative Media from the City University of Hong Kong in 2009. Since then, he has become an artist known for installation art and audiovisual performance.

== Works ==
Cheung was invited to create a kinetic calligraphy installation Waving Script (2022) to be performed in Hong Kong Palace Museum in 2022. Inspired by the 20th century ink art master Wu Guanzhong, the Falling Tears (2024), which was designated to the Hong Kong Museum of Art, is a site-specific installation using emerging technology. The same year, Cheung collaborated with the Hong Kong Dance Company on After Snowfall (2024), creating a work that translated a performer's brainwave data into ink stroke visual, intertwining it with water sleeve dance.

For the 2025 iteration of The Peninsula Hong Kong's "Art in Resonance" program, Cheung was commissioned by Tai Ping Carpets to create The Flow Pavilion (2025), a teahouse installation blending technology and carpet craftmanship in the hotel's Verandah restaurant. For the Echigo-Tsumari Art Field 2025, Cheung and ink artist Sim Shum Kwun Yi presented The Whispers of Stone (2025), an immersive sensory installation. Their work combined water stones with sound, light, and painting at The Hong Kong House in Tsunan, Japan.

== Prize and Awards ==
- 4th SCM Distinguished Alumni Award
- UOB Art in Ink Awards 2019
- Hong Kong Arts Development Council Award for Young Artist 2010
- DFA Hong Kong Young Design Talent Award 2011
- New York Art Director Club Young Guns 11
- 19th Hong Kong Arts Development Awards Artist of the Year (Media Arts)
