= Beijing Treaty on Audiovisual Performances =

Multilateral treaty on copyright for audiovisual performances

- Parties to the convention
- Signed: 24 June 2012
- Location: Beijing, China
- Effective: 28 April 2020
- Condition: 30 ratifications
- Signatories: 74
- Parties: 99 (As of October 2026)
- Depositaries: Secretary-General of WIPO
- Languages: Arabic, Chinese, English, French, Russian and Spanish (and any other language on the request of an interested party)

The Beijing Treaty on Audiovisual Performances is a multilateral treaty which regulates copyright for audiovisual performances and expands the performers' rights. It was adopted on 26 June 2012 by the Diplomatic Conference on the Protection of Audiovisual Performances of the World Intellectual Property Organization, in which 156 WIPO member states, six intergovernmental, and six non-governmental organizations participated. Forty-eight countries signed the treaty on 26 June, followed by 19 other countries in 2012 and 2013. The treaty entered into force on 28 April 2020 following the receipt of the 30th ratification or accession and as of September 2025 has 48 contracting parties.

The treaty has been praised by artists' and performers rights advocates around the world as well as some activist nonprofits such as Knowledge Ecology International, but has also been criticized by some digital rights and free culture activists such as the Electronic Frontier Foundation (EFF) as an infringement on free speech, and aiding censorship schemes.

== Adoption ==
Negotiations for the treaty lasted 12 years. It was adopted on 26 June 2012 by WIPO's Diplomatic Conference on the Protection of Audiovisual Performances, which began on 20 June in Beijing. 156 WIPO member states, six intergovernmental and six non-governmental organizations participated in the conference. It is the only international IP treaty named for a Chinese city.

The Final Act of the treaty was signed by 122 countries, and the treaty itself collected 48 country signatures. Signatories from Europe include Cyprus, Denmark, France, Hungary, Italy, Moldova, Spain, Switzerland; from Americas, Chile, Colombia, Grenada, Costa Rica, Haiti, Jamaica, Mexico, Nicaragua, Peru and the United States of America; and from Asia, China, Mongolia, South Korea. The convention remained open for signature for one year. During that time, 19 additional countries and the European Union joined as signatories (Austria, Belgium, Bulgaria, Botswana, Czech Republic, El Salvador, Estonia, Germany, Greece, Guatemala, Honduras, Indonesia, Montenegro, Poland, Qatar, Romania, Slovenia, the United Kingdom, and Zimbabwe). Further countries may become a party to the treaty through accession. The treaty has not entered into force until it has been ratified by at least 30 eligible parties.

In February 2016, U.S. President Barack Obama submitted the treaty to the U.S. Senate for ratification. With the ratification of Indonesia on 28 January 2020, the Beijing Treaty entered into force for its 30 contracting parties on 28 April 2020. WIPO member states in 2012 approved the Treaty at a Diplomatic Conference hosted by the Chinese Government in Beijing, from where the Treaty takes its name.

As of March 2, 2021, the treaty is not in force in either the EU, UK or US. Signatories to the treaty must also ratify the treaty for it to be considered "in force".

== Scope ==
The treaty is a multilateral treaty which regulates copyright for audiovisual performances.

According to WIPO "the new treaty brings audiovisual performers into the fold of the international copyright framework in a comprehensive way, for the first time", referring to the clauses dedicated to protecting their works on the Internet. It addresses the issue of the copyright system discriminating against certain groups of performers, as the previous treaties, such as WIPO Performances and Phonograms Treaty, focused more on the sound than visual aspects. WIPO states that the treaty boosts the economic rights and moral rights of audiovisual performers (the performers' rights). The expanded economic rights give them an opportunity to share the income collected by producers from internationally distributed audiovisual works. The moral rights address issues such as lack of attribution and distortion.

== Praise ==
The treaty has been praised by a number of audiovisual performers. Publicity was provided by the presence and support from several world-famous actors, namely American Meryl Streep, Brazilian Sônia Braga, Chinese Mei Baojiu and Spanish Javier Bardem and Antonio Banderas, who spoke out on several instances endorsing the treaty. Government representatives from China, EU, and the United States also supported the initiative. Organizations supporting the treaty include the International Intellectual Property Alliance.

== Criticism ==
The treaty has been criticized by digital rights and free culture scholars and activists, for giving the actors a monopoly on deciding how their audiovisual performances can be used. The performers in question no longer have to hold the copyright to their work for that purpose critics claim, it is possible that the new treaty would make it increasingly illegal to use clips from movies, TV series, and other such preferences in mash-ups, remixes, and parodies. There are fears that this would allow actors and musicians (who are also covered by the treaty) to shut down any such parody or commentary not to their liking, thus infringing on free speech and limiting fair use and similar reuse rights. Professor Hannibal Travis noted that the treaty makes it easier to set up censorship schemes. Techdirt has remarked that the treaty also allows for those new rights to be transferred to the producers, which can lead to a system where the performers are forced to do so, thus further strengthening the producers and organizations like RIAA and MPAA.
