= Victorian Trugo Association =

The Victorian Trugo Association is the principal governing body for the sport of trugo. It was formed in 1940 by four founding clubs, Footscray, Yarraville, Newport (established 1940, now defunct) and Williamstown (established 1938, now defunct).

As of 2024, there are 7 clubs within the association:

- Ascot Vale Trugo Club
- Brunswick Trugo Club (established ca. 1940s)
- Footscray Trugo Club (established 1937)
- Port Melbourne Trugo Club (established at least in 1960s)
- Sandridge Trugo Club (established at least in 1960s)
- South Melbourne Trugo Club (established ca. 1952)
- Yarraville Trugo Club (established 1937)

Footscray Trugo Club presently fields 2 teams, known as the 'Doughnuts', and the 'Gumnuts'. Brunswick Truro Club presently fields 2 teams, known as 'Brunswick' and 'Brunswick City'. This makes a total of 9 teams, all competing within a single league.

The league runs each summer over approximately 16 rounds.

Other former members of the association include:

- Carlton Trugo Club (established approximately 1940)
- Coburg Trugo Club
- Moonee Ponds Trugo Club
- Pascoe Vale Trugo Club
- Prahran Trugo Club
- Preston Trugo Club (established 1960, disbanded 1980s)
- Reservoir Trugo Club
- Shepparton Trugo Club (established approximately 1946)

== Recent winners ==
Season	Club	Team
2014/15	Brunswick	'Brunswick City'
2015/16	N/A	N/A
2016/17	Brunswick	'Brunswick City'
2017/18	Brunswick	'Brunswick City'
2018/19	Brunswick	'Brunswick'
2019/20	Brunswick	'Brunswick'
2020/21	Brunswick	'Brunswick'
2021/22	Brunswick	'Brunswick'
2022/23	Footscray	'Gumnuts'
2023/24	Brunswick	'Brunswick'
