= Dania Nassief =

- Born: 1974 (age 51–52)
- Education: University of Southampton
- Occupation: Film producer

Dania Nassief (Arabic: دانية نصيف; Born 1974) is an independent film producer and managing partner in the Saudi company Eggdancer Productions. Nassief and her partner Danya M. Alhamrani are the first women in Saudi Arabia allowed to own and manage a production company without a male business manager.

Dania graduated in 2002 from University of Southampton, United Kingdom with an MSc. degree in Information Systems majoring in e-business/e-commerce.

== Sources ==
- Teuteberg, Amy (July 15, 2008). "Under the Abbaya: Female Producers in Saudi Arabia" "Under the Abbaya: Female Producers in Saudi Arabia". Travel Channel.
- Alhamrani, Danya M. (September 16, 2008)."Female film company unveils Saudi Arabia". Partners in Humanity. Common Ground News Service.
- "Eggdancer Productions". Loaded Bow. October 10, 2008.
