= Burt Katz =

American restaurateur

Burton D. Katz (7 July 1937, in Chicago – 30 April 2016) was a pizza-maker and owner of Burt's Place, a Morton Grove, Illinois, pizza restaurant. Burt and his wife Sharon achieved worldwide fame in 2009 after being featured on a Chicago-themed episode (5th episode of Season 5) of Anthony Bourdain's television documentary series No Reservations. Burt died in 2016, passing the ownership to two men.

Katz grew up in the Wicker Park, Chicago, neighborhood. He served in the U.S. Marine Corps and studied history at Roosevelt University. On their honeymoon, starting in December 1962, Burt and Sharon Katz went on a year-long, around-the-world honeymoon, which was reported in many international newspapers. In 1963, Katz became an owner-partner in an Evanston pizzeria called The Inferno one of a series of pizzerias with literary names he opened and where he introduced his signature caramelized cheese crust style of pizza. He sold his share in 1965. Katz went on to open Gulliver's on Chicago's Howard Street, selling it in 1968. He then left the restaurant business but returned in 1971, opening Pequod's in Morton Grove. After working 80 to 90 hours a week for 15 years he sold Pequod's in 1985 to Keith Jackson, who also owned Gunzo's Sports Center. Mr. Jackson later opened a second location on Chicago's N. Clybourn Avenue and also added a thin crust pizza option.

In 1989 Burt and Sharon Katz opened the restaurant Starback's, which was renamed Burt's Place because of a possible trademark conflict with Starbucks. Burt was the sole operator in the kitchen, while Sharon was the sole operator for the dining room with customer reception and orders. Due to Burt's health problems, Burt's Place closed in 2015. A photograph of a slice of pizza from Burt's Place was featured on the cover of the October 2007 issue of the magazine Saveur with an accompanying article; a huge reprint of the cover was displayed on the wall next to the kitchen entryway. In 2012, based upon a survey involving 85,000 votes, the editors of the magazine Men's Health selected Burt's Place as the USA's Best Pizza Parlor. In 2017 Burt's Place was reopened by Jerry Petrow and John Munao, who were selected and trained by Burt Katz when he was dying of cancer.

Upon Burt Katz's death, he was survived by his widow, three children, and six grandchildren; he was predeceased by one grandchild.
