= Martin Picard =

Canadian chef

- Born: November 20, 1966 (age 59); Repentigny, Quebec, Canada
- Education: Institut de tourisme et d'hôtellerie du Québec
- Culinary career
- Cooking style: Canadian, Québécois
- Current restaurant
- Au Pied de Cochon

Martin Picard (born November 20, 1966) is a Canadian chef, author and television personality.

Picard is the author of Au Pied de Cochon Sugar Shack, including 100 recipes including maple tree products. He has hosted the Food Network (Canada) show "The Wild Chef".

He appeared on Anthony Bourdain's show No Reservations during the "Quebec" episode that aired April 17, 2006. He took Bourdain to a duck farm and then served him several foie gras dishes at Picard's restaurant Au Pied de Cochon in Montreal, Quebec. Bourdain would later write that Picard was a "madman-genius" whose guiding principle was "too much is not enough". Time (magazine) referred to his restaurant as a "bastion of excess beloved by Anthony Bourdain and other gastronomes."

Picard opened a sugar shack at St Benoit de Mirabel in 2009. His dishes include maple pig's head and a lobster pie with layers of creme brulee and almond cream.
