= In the Kitchen with Stefano Faita =

- Genre: Cooking show
- Starring: Stefano Faita
- Country of origin: Canada
- Original language: English
- No. of seasons: 3
- No. of episodes: 220

Original release
- Network: CBC Television
- Release: September 19, 2011 – March 6, 2014

In the Kitchen with Stefano Faita is a Canadian television cooking show, which aired from 2011 to 2014 on CBC Television. Hosted by Montreal chef and restaurateur Stefano Faita, the show featured Faita demonstrating recipes, predominantly but not exclusively associated with Italian and Québécois cuisines.

The show was taped in front of a live studio audience.

The show's cancellation was announced in March 2014, amid budget cuts at the CBC. Repeats continued to air on CBC Television, OUTtv and Telelatino.
