= Au Pied de Cochon =

- Location in Montreal

Restaurant information
- Established: November 2001
- Owner: Martin Picard
- Chef: Martin Picard
- Food type: Contemporary Québécois
- Dress code: Casual
- Rating: Recommended (Michelin Guide)
- Location: 536 Duluth Street East, Montreal, Quebec, H2L 1A9, Canada
- Coordinates: 45.522022°N 73.574699°W
- Reservations: Yes
- Website: aupieddecochon.ca

Au Pied de Cochon ("At the Pig's Foot") is a restaurant in Montreal, Quebec, Canada. It is located at 536 Duluth Street East in the borough of Le Plateau-Mont-Royal. Au Pied de Cochon also has a Sugar Shack and La Cabane d'à Côté in St-Benoît de Mirabel, which are open to normal reservations during the maple sugar season. The restaurant was founded by chef Martin Picard in 2001. In 2019, the Montreal location was named the 34th best restaurant in Canada, according to Canada's 100 Best.

== Reception ==
Celebrity chef Anthony Bourdain visited Au Pied de Cochon on his program No Reservations, enjoying a fourteen-course meal centred around pork and foie gras. In the tie-in book, he praised the restaurant's philosophy and operating principles, which he described as "too much is not enough" and "good things, in get-the-defibrillator abundance".

In 2020, the Sugar Shack was featured in an episode, season 3 episode 5, of the Netflix show Somebody Feed Phil.

In 2025, the business received a 'Recommended' designation in Quebec's inaugural Michelin Guide. Per the guide, a 'Recommended' selection "is the sign of a chef using quality ingredients that are well cooked; simply a good meal" and that the anonymous inspectors had found "the food to be above average, but not quite at [Michelin star] level."

=== Canada's 100 Best Restaurants Ranking ===
Au Pied de Cochon
Year	Rank	Change
2015	34	new
2016	34	Steady
2017	22	▲12
2018	82	▼60
2019	▼ No Rank	
2020	▼ No Rank	
2021	No List	
2022	▼ No Rank	
2023	▼ No Rank	
2024	51	▲ re-entry
2025	76	▼25
2026	78	▼2
