= Audiovisual performance =

Audiovisual performances are performances by performers such as singers, musicians, dancers and actors in Audiovisual Media such as a DVD, a music video or any other audiovisual platform. The World Intellectual Property Organization (WIPO) has prepared a number of analyses and surveys mapping the protection of audiovisual performances in many different countries. Until 2012 audiovisual performances were denied any meaningful protection at international level. The WIPO multilateral treaty acknowledging for the first time the intellectual property rights of performers with regard to their audiovisual performances called the Beijing Treaty on Audiovisual Performances.
