= Zamir Gotta =

Russian television producer and producer

- Born: Iazamir Gotta; 1955 or 1956 (age 70–71); Moscow, Russian SFSR, Soviet Union
- Education: Moscow State Pedagogical University
- Occupations: Television personality; producer
- Spouse: Katya
- Children: 2
- Website: zamirgotta.com

Iazamir Gotta (born 1955 or 1956) is a Russian television personality and producer. He is best known as the travelling companion of American chef Anthony Bourdain on his Travel Channel TV show Anthony Bourdain: No Reservations.

== Early life ==
Gotta born in Moscow and is of Jewish and Crimean Tatar ancestry. He was educated at Moscow State Pedagogical University, where he studied English, and taught the language in Moscow from 1983 to 1988.

== Career ==
Gotta began his career as a film producer working on American productions in Russia. In 2006, he began working as a consultant for the New York-based Trident Media Group, and has produced episodes of Cities of the Underworld for the History Channel, and the Nova documentary Astrospies for PBS, both airing in 2008.

Gotta first met Anthony Bourdain in 2002 when the chef hired him as a guide for the Saint Petersburg, Russia, episode of A Cook's Tour. Gotta subsequently appeared in one more episode of that series, seven episodes of Anthony Bourdain: No Reservations, and two episodes of Anthony Bourdain: Parts Unknown, the last in 2016. Bourdain called Gotta an "international man of mystery", and his affable personality made him a "something of a folk hero" among fans of Bourdain's shows.

Gotta launched his own vodka brand, Peacemaker, in 2016.

== Personal life ==
Gotta and his wife Katya are parents of a daughter, Anna, and a son, Anton, who was partially named for Anthony Bourdain. In 2022, 20-year-old Anton died by suicide. After previously living in Connecticut, the Gottas moved to Buffalo, New York, which Zamir first visited while filming an episode of No Reservations.

== Appearances with Anthony Bourdain ==
=== A Cook's Tour ===
- "The Cook Who Came in from the Cold" (2002)
- "So Much Vodka, So Little Time" (2002)

=== No Reservations ===
- "Uzbekistan" (2005)
- "Russia" (2007)
- "Romania" (2008)
- "Rust Belt: Buffalo/Baltimore/Detroit" (2009)
- "Ukraine" (2011)
- "Kansas City" (2012)
- "Brooklyn" (2012)

=== Parts Unknown ===
- "Russia" (2014)
- "Tbilisi, Georgia" (2016)
