= James Beard Foundation Award: 2010s =

The James Beard Foundation Awards are annual awards presented by the James Beard Foundation to recognize culinary professionals in the United States. The awards recognize chefs, restaurateurs, authors and journalists each year, and are generally scheduled around James Beard's May birthday.

Annually since 1998, the foundation has awarded the designation of America's Classic for local independently-owned restaurants that reflect the character of the community.

== 2010 awards ==
The 2010 James Beard Foundation Awards were presented on May 3, 2010, at New York's Lincoln Center, in a ceremony hosted by Alton Brown, Lidia Bastianich, and Wolfgang Puck. The media and book awards were presented one nigher earlier in a ceremony at Espace, hosted by Kelly Choi and Andrew Zimmern.

=== Chef and Restaurant Awards ===
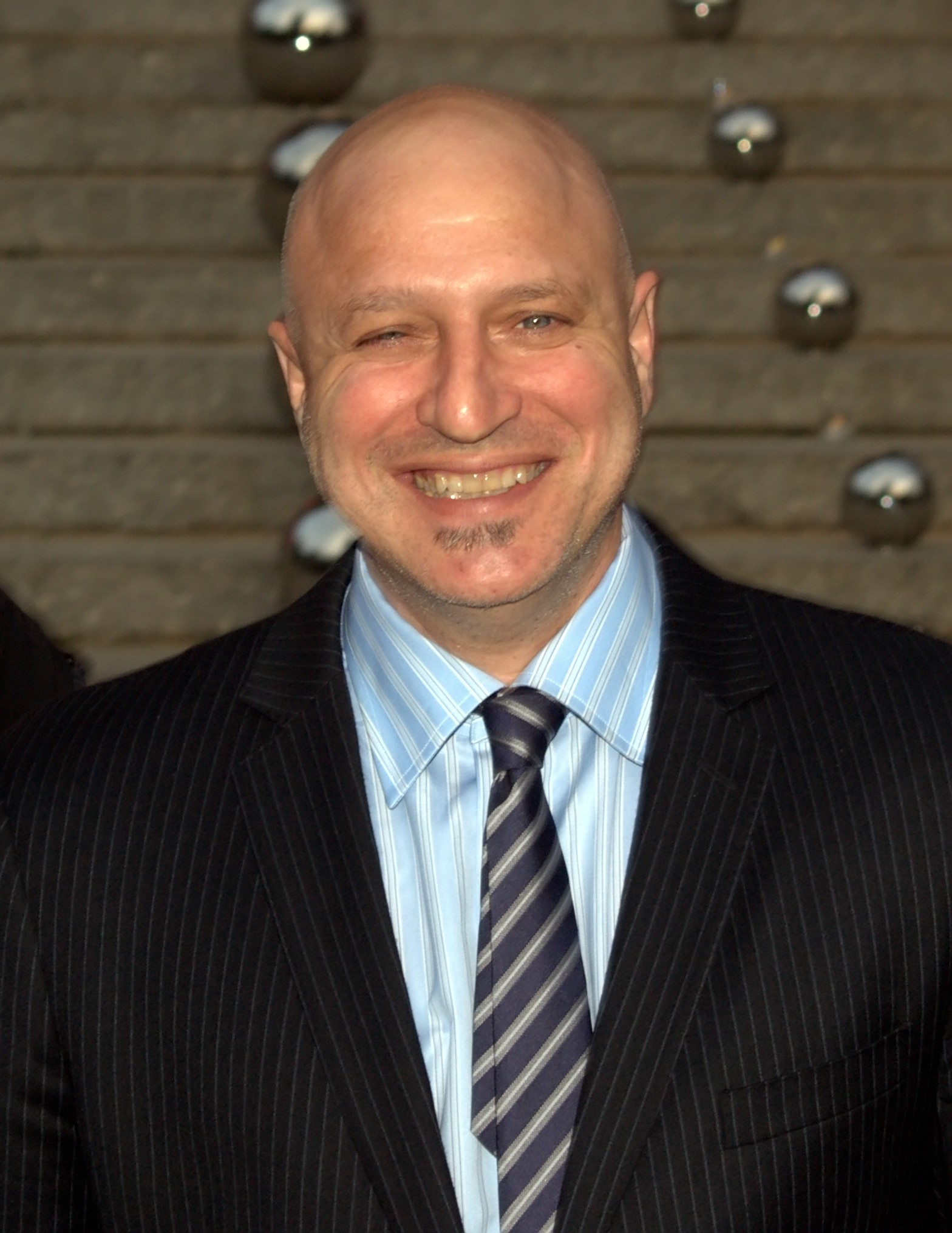
Tom Colicchio

Sources:

- Chef: Tom Colicchio, Craft, New York, NY
- Lifetime Achievement Award: Ariane and Michael Batterberry, Founders, Food & Wine and Food Arts
- Humanitarian of the Year: Wayne Kostroski
- Rising Star Chef of the Year: Timothy Hollingsworth, The French Laundry, Yountville, CA
- Restaurant: Daniel, Chef/Owner: Daniel Boulud, New York, NY
- New Restaurant: Marea, Chef/Partners: Michael White and Chris Cannon, New York, NY
- Restaurateur: Keith McNally, Balthazar, Lucky Strike, Minetta Tavern, Douglas Palley, Morandi, Pastis, Pravda, and Schiller's Liquor Bar, New York, NY
- Pastry Chef: Nicole Plue, Redd, Yountville, CA
- Wine Service: Jean Georges, Wine Director: Bernard Sun, New York
- Wine and Spirits Professional: John Shafer and Doug Shafer, Shafer Vineyards, Napa, CA
- Service: Grant Achatz, Alinea, Chicago, IL
- Great Lakes Chef: Koren Grieveson, Avec, Chicago, IL
- Mid-Atlantic Chef: Jeff Michaud, Osteria, Philadelphia, PA
- Midwest Chef: Alexander Roberts, Restaurant Alma, Minneapolis, MN
- New York City Chef: Daniel Humm, Eleven Madison Park, New York, NY
- Northeast Chef: Clark Frasier and Mark Gaier, Arrows, Ogunquit, ME
- Northwest Chef: Jason Wilson, Crush, Seattle, WA
- Pacific Chef: David Kinch, Manresa, Los Gatos, CA
- Southeast Chef: Sean Brock, McCrady's, Charleston, SC
- Southwest Chef: Claude Le Tohic, Joël Robuchon, Las Vegas, NV
- South Chef: Michael Schwartz, Michael's Genuine Food & Drink, Miami, FL
- Restaurant Design: Andre Kikoski Architect, The Wright, New York, NY
- Restaurant Graphics: Pandiscio Co., The Standard Grill, New York, NY

=== Book Awards ===
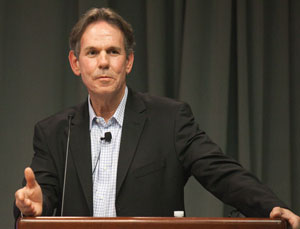
Thomas Keller

Sources:

- Cookbook of the Year: The Country Cooking of Ireland by Colman Andrews
- Cookbook Hall of Fame: A Book of Middle Eastern Food by Claudia Roden
- American Cooking: Real Cajun by Donald Link with Paula Disbrowe
- Baking and Dessert: Baking by James Peterson
- Beverage: Been Doon So Long: A Randall Grahm Vinthology by Randall Grahm
- Cooking from a Professional Point of View: The Fundamental Techniques of Classic Pastry Arts by The French Culinary Institute with Judith Choate
- General Cooking: Ad Hoc at Home by Thomas Keller with Dave Cruz
- Healthy Focus: Love Soup: 160 All-New Vegetarian Recipes from the Author of "The Vegetarian Epicure" by Anna Thomas
- International: The Country Cooking of Ireland by Colman Andrews
- Photography: Seven Fires: Grilling the Argentine Way Photographer: Santiago Soto Monllor
- Reference and Scholarship: Encyclopedia of Pasta by Oretta Zanini de Vita
- Single Subject: Pasta Sfoglia by Ron and Colleen Suhanosky with Susan Simon
- Writing and Literature: Save the Deli by David Sax

=== Broadcast Media Awards ===
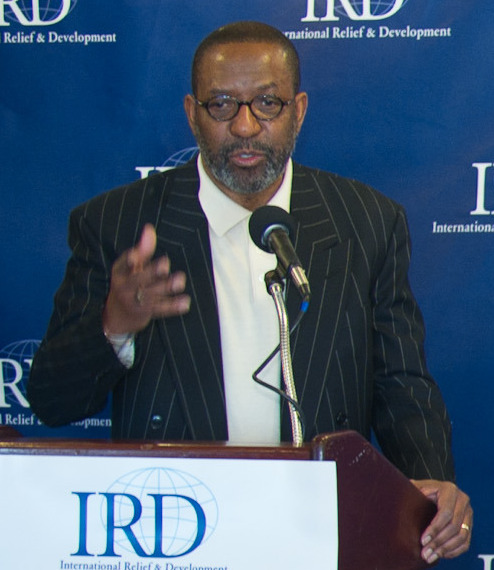
Kojo Nnamdi

Sources:

- TV Food Personality: Andrew Zimmern, "Bizarre Foods with Andrew Zimmern," The Travel Channel
- Television Special: "Food Trip with Todd English," José Andrés, Todd English, PBS
- Television Food Segment: "ABC News Nightline," John Berman, ABC News
- Television Show, In Studio: "French Food at Home with Laura Calder," Laura Calder," Food Network Canada
- Television Show, On Location: "Chefs A' Field: King of Alaska," Rick Moonen, PBS
- Audio Webcast or Radio Show: "The Kojo Nnamdi Show," Kojo Nnamdi, Washington, DC
- Video Webcast: "The Greenmarket: One Farmer's Story," Serious Eats

=== Journalism Awards ===
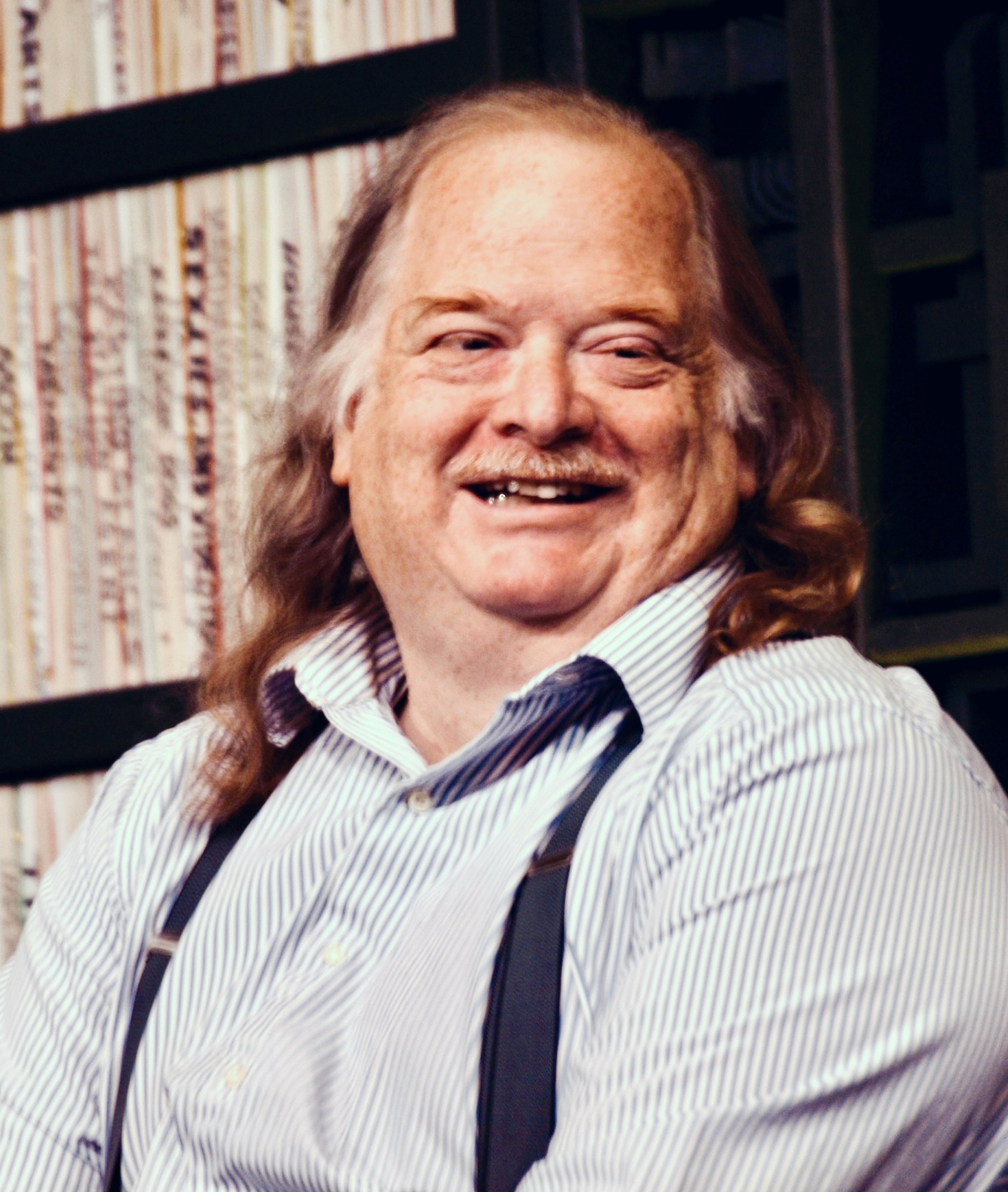
Jonathan Gold

Sources:

- Distinguished Restaurant Reviews: Jonathan Gold, LA Weekly, "Sauced," "Hot Birria, Cold Cerveza," "Hare Today"
- Food Blog: Serious Eats, Ed Levine, Seriouseats.com
- Food-related Columns: Rachel Wharton, Edible Brooklyn, Back of the House "Egg," "Roberta's," "Franny's and Bklyn Larder"
- Magazine Feature Writing About Restaurants and/or Chefs: Anya von Bremzen, Saveur, "Soul of a City"
- Magazine Feature Writing With Recipes: Francine Maroukian, Jon Reiner, Esquire, "How Men Eat"
- Magazine Feature Writing Without Recipes: Barry Estabrook, Gourmet, "The Price of Tomatoes"
- M.F.K. Fisher Distinguished Writing Award: Francine Prose, Saveur, "Faith and Bacon"
- Multimedia Food Feature: Kevin Pang, Chicagotribune.com, "The Cheeseburger Show"
- Newspaper Feature Writing About Restaurants and/or Chefs: Jared Jacang Maher, Westword, "A Hunger to Help"
- Newspaper Feature Writing: Cliff Doerksen, Chicago Reader, "The Real American Pie"
- Newspaper Food Section: The Washington Post, Joe Yonan
- Reporting on Health, Environment or Nutrition: Rowan Jacobsen, EatingWell, "?Or Not to Bee"
- Website Focusing on Food, Beverage, Restaurants, or Nutrition: Chowhound, Jane Goldman
- Writing on Spirits, Wine, or Beer: Dara Moskowitz Grumdahl, Minnesota Monthly, "Chardonnay Uncorked"

== 2011 awards ==
The 2011 James Beard Awards were presented on May 9, 2011, at New York's Lincoln Center, hosted by Tom Colicchio, Ming Tsai and Traci Des Jardins.

=== Chef and Restaurant Awards ===
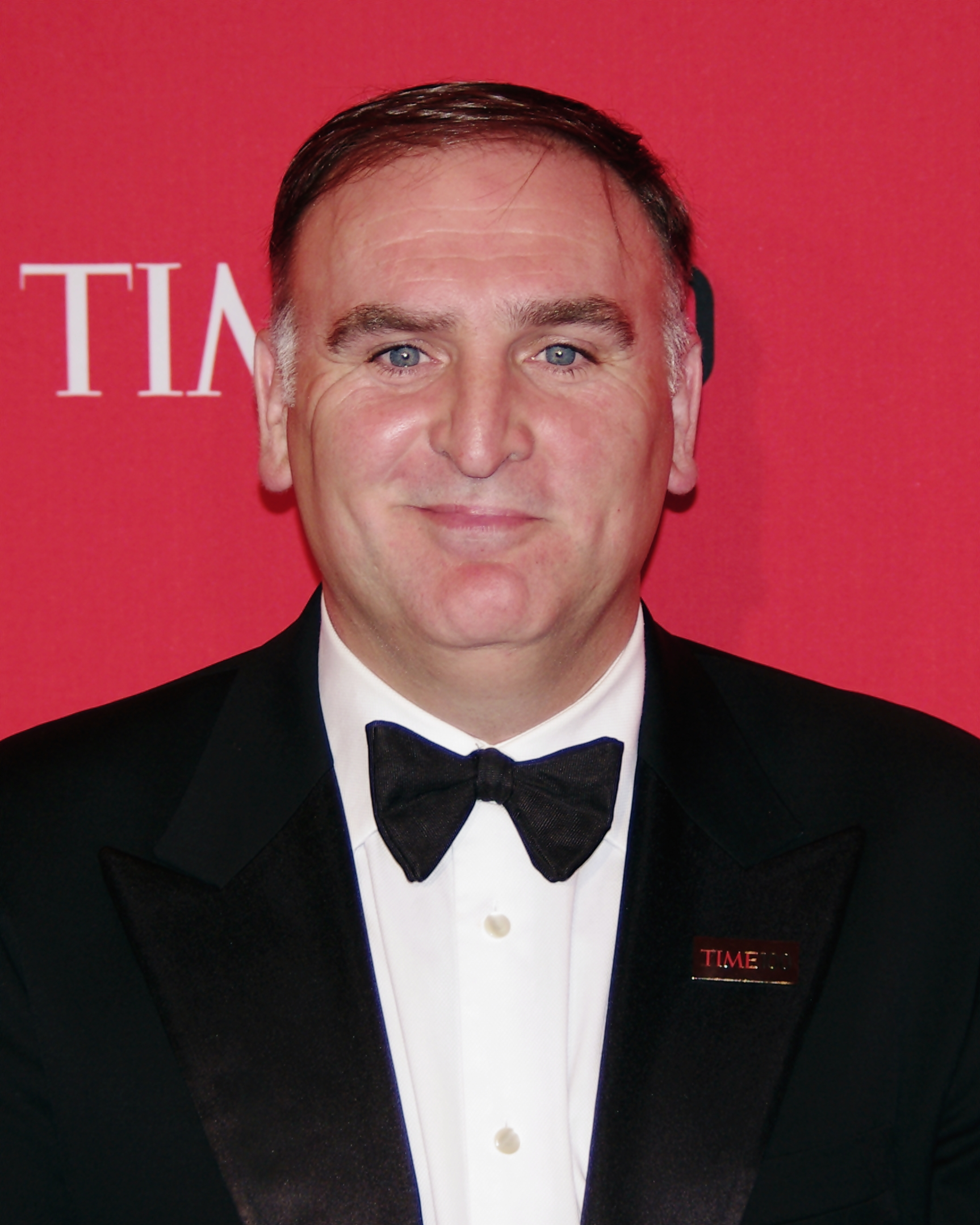
José Andrés

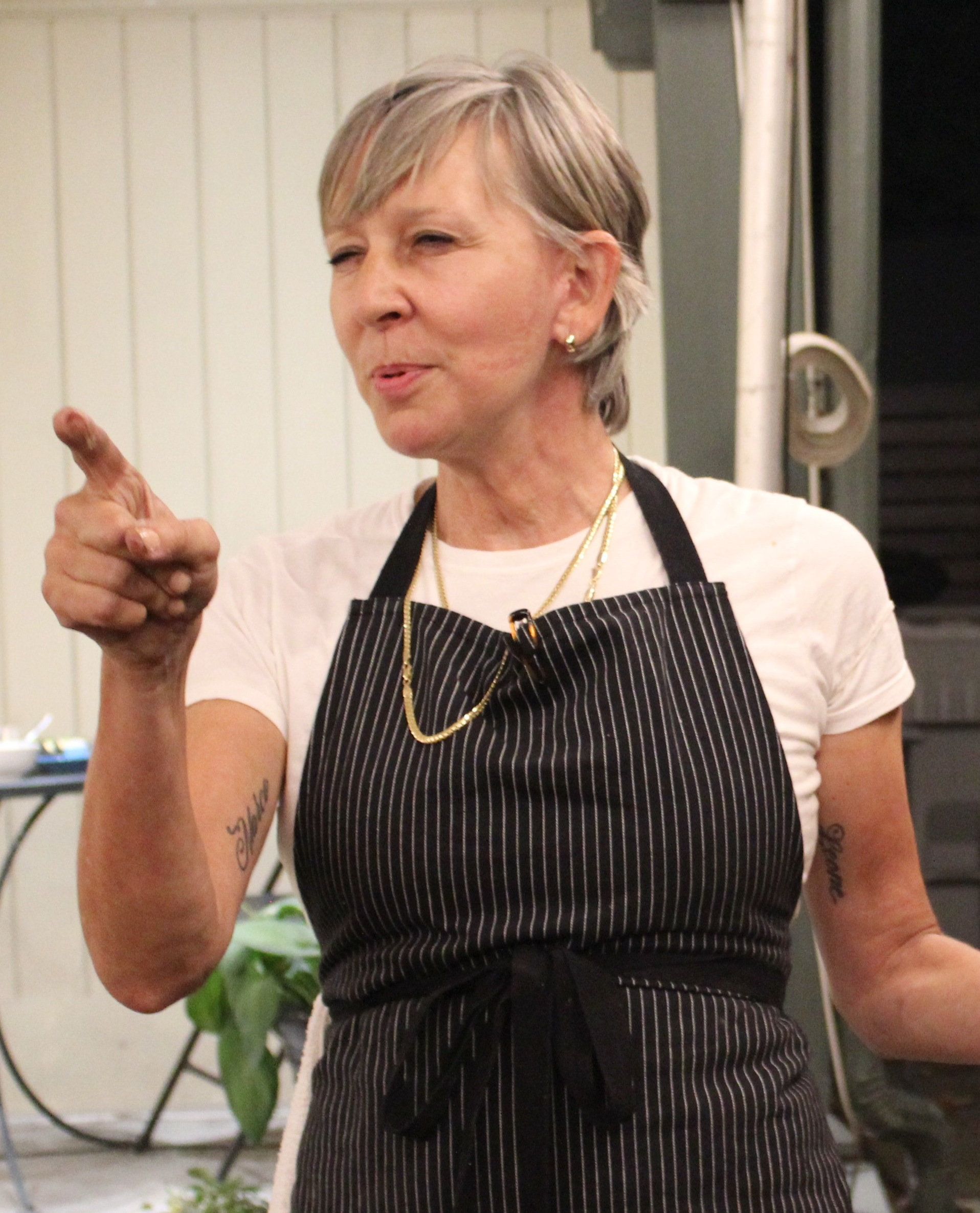
Gabrielle Hamilton

Sources:

- Chef: José Andrés, Minibar, Washington, DC
- Lifetime Achievement Award: Kevin Zraly
- Rising Star Chef of the Year: Gabriel Rucker, Le Pigeon, Portland, OR
- Restaurant: Eleven Madison Park, New York, NY
- New Restaurant: ABC Kitchen, New York, NY
- Restaurateur: Richard Melman, Lettuce Entertain You Restaurants
- Pastry Chef: Angela Pinkerton, Eleven Madison Park, New York, NY
- Wine Service: Belinda Chang, The Modern, New York, NY
- Wine and Spirits Professional: Julian Van Winkle III, Old Rip Van Winkle Distillery, Louisville, KY
- Service: Per Se, New York, NY
- Great Lakes Chef: Alex Young, Zingerman's Roadhouse, Ann Arbor, MI
- Mid-Atlantic Chef: Michael Solomonov, Zahav, Philadelphia, PA
- Midwest Chef: Isaac Becker, 112 Eatery, Minneapolis, MN
- New York City Chef: Gabrielle Hamilton, Prune, New York, NY
- Northeast Chef: Tony Maws, Craigie on Main, Cambridge, MA
- Northwest Chef: Andy Ricker, Pok Pok, Portland, OR
- Pacific Chef: Michael Tusk, Quince, San Francisco, CA
- Southeast Chef: Andrea Reusing, Lantern, Chapel Hill, NC
- Southwest Chef: TIE Saipin Chutima, Lotus of Siam, Las Vegas and Tyson Cole, Uchi, Austin, TX
- South Chef: Stephen Stryjewski, Cochon, New Orleans, LA
- Restaurant Design: Darling Design, Bar Agricole, San Francisco, CA
- Restaurant Graphics: Love and War, The National Bar & Dining Rooms, New York, NY

=== Book Awards ===
Sources:

- Cookbook Hall of Fame: On Food and Cooking: The Science & Lore of the Kitchen by Harold McGee
- Cookbook of the Year: Oaxaca al Gusto: An Infinite Gastronomy by Diana Kennedy
- American Cooking: Pig: King of the Southern Table by James Villas
- Baking and Dessert: Good to the Grain: Baking with Whole-Grain Flours by Kim Boyce
- Beverage: Secrets of the Sommeliers: How to Think and Drink Like the World's Top Wine Professionals by Jordan Mackay and Rajat Parr
- Cooking from a Professional Point of View: Noma: Time and Place in Nordic Cuisine by René Redzepi
- General Cooking: The Essential New York Times Cook Book: Classic Recipes for a New Century by Amanda Hesser
- Healthy Focus: The Simple Art of EatingWell Cookbook by Jessie Price & the EatingWell Test Kitchen
- International: Stir-Frying to the Sky's Edge: The Ultimate Guide to Mastery, with Authentic Recipes and Stories by Grace Young
- Photography: Noma: Time and Place in Nordic Cuisine Photographer: Ditte Isager
- Reference and Scholarship: Salted: A Manifesto on the World's Most Essential Mineral, with Recipes by Mark Bitterman
- Single Subject: Meat: A Kitchen Education by James Peterson
- Writing and Literature: Four Fish: The Future of the Last Wild Food by Paul Greenberg

=== Broadcast Media Awards ===
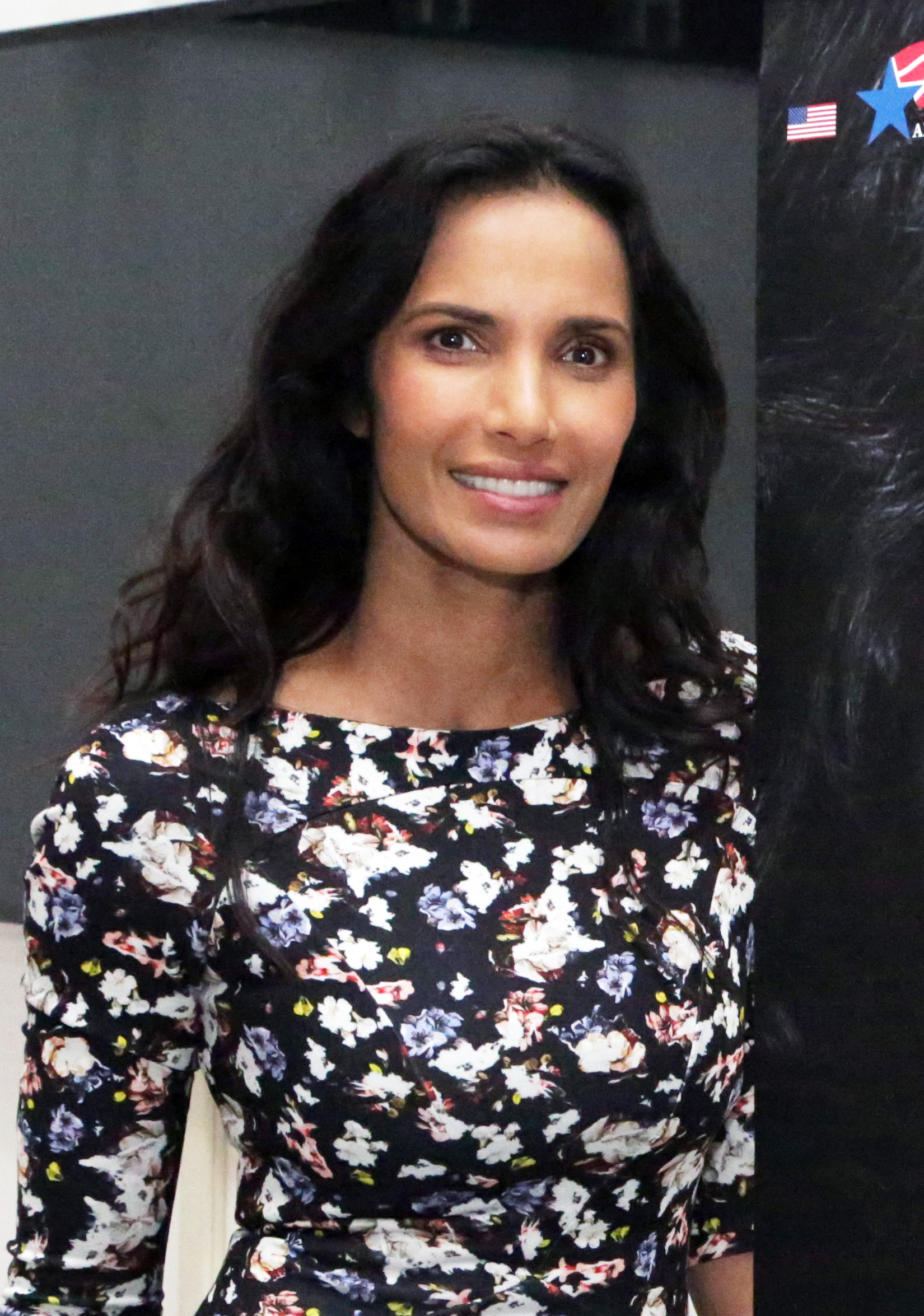
Padma Lakshmi

Sources:

- Audio Webcast or Radio Show: "CBC Ideas: "Pasta: The Long and Short of It," Megan Williams
- TV Food Personality: Alton Brown, "Good Eats," Food Network
- Television Special: "Milk War," Colm Feore, ichannel
- Television Segment: "60 Minutes: "Chef José Andrés," Anderson Cooper, CBS
- Television Program, In Studio: "Top Chef (season 7)," Padma Lakshmi, Bravo
- Television Program, On Location: "Avec Eric," Eric Ripert, PBS
- Video Webcast: "The Scent of Black" Graperadio: Mark Ryan, Jay Selman, graperadio.com

=== Journalism Awards ===
Sources:

- Publication of the Year Award: Edible Communities
- Cooking, Recipes, or Instruction: Amy Thielen, Minneapolis Star Tribune, "A Good Catch," "Low-Tech Wonder," "From the Bean Patch: Plenty"
- Distinguished Restaurant Review Award: Patric Kuh, Los Angeles, CA, "Animal Magnetism," "Making Their Move," "Time for a Redo?"
- Environment, Food Politics, and Policy: Carl Safina, EatingWell, "Sea Change"
- Food Culture and Travel: Rick Bragg, Francine Maroukian, and Robb Walsh, Garden & Gun, "The Southerner's Guide to Oysters"
- Food-related Columns and Commentary: Tim Carman, Washington City Paper, "Ignore the Pizza Police," "Supply and Da Men," "Schmeer Campaign"
- Food-related Feature: Dan Koeppel, Saveur, "Fruit of the Future"
- Food Section of a General Interest Publication: GQ, The Editors of GQ
- Group Food Blog: Grub Street New York, Newyork.grubstreet.com, Daniel Maurer, Jenny Miller, and Alan Sytsma
- Health and Nutrition: Rachael Moeller Gorman, EatingWell, "Captain of the Happier Meal"
- Humor: Ruth Bourdain, Twitter.com/RuthBourdain
- Individual Food Blog: Politics of the Plate, Politicsoftheplate.com, Barry Estabrook
- M.F.K. Fisher Distinguished Writing Award: Jonathan Gold, LA Weekly, "A Movable Beast"
- Multimedia Food Feature: Michael Gebert and Julia Thiel, The Chicago Reader, Key Ingredient: "Kluwak Kupas," "Chinese Black Beans," "Geraniums"
- Personal Essay: Tom Junod, Esquire, "My Mom Couldn't Cook"
- Profile: Benjamin Wallace, New York, "The Restaurant Auteur"
- Wine and Spirits: Jon Fine, Food & Wine, "Natural Wine: Weird or Wonderful?"

== 2012 awards ==
The James Beard Awards were presented on May 7, 2012, at New York's Lincoln Center and hosted by Alton Brown. The book, broadcast, and journalism winners were announced at Gotham Hall on May 4, 2012 and co-hosted by Michael Symon and Martha Teichner.

=== Chef and Restaurant Awards ===
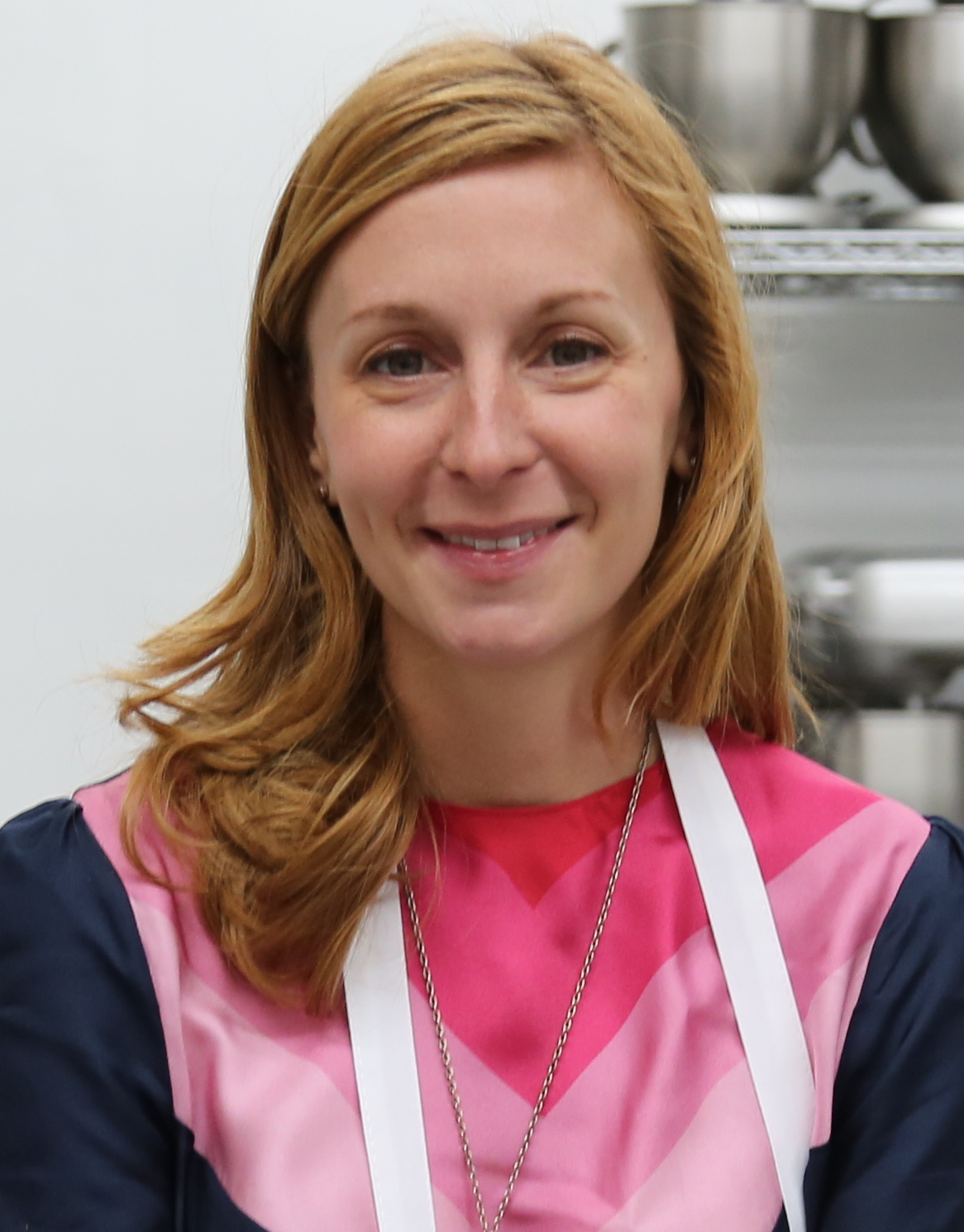
Christina Tosi

Sources:

- Outstanding Chef: Daniel Humm, Eleven Madison Park, New York City, NY
- Lifetime Achievement Award: Wolfgang Puck
- Rising Star Chef of the Year: Christina Tosi, Momofuku Milk Bar, New York City, NY
- Restaurant: Boulevard, San Francisco, CA
- New Restaurant: Next, Chicago, IL
- Restaurateur: Tom Douglas, Tom Douglas Restaurants, Seattle, WA
- Pastry Chef: Mindy Segal, Mindy's Hot Chocolate, Chicago, IL
- Wine Program: No. 9 Park, Boston, MA
- Wine and Spirits Professional: Paul Grieco, Terroir, New York City, NY
- Service: La Grenouille, New York City, NY
- Great Lakes Chef: Bruce Sherman, North Pond, Chicago, IL
- Mid-Atlantic Chef: Maricel Presilla, Cucharamama, Hoboken, NJ
- Midwest Chef: Tory Miller, L'Etoile, Madison, WI
- New York City Chef: Michael Anthony, Gramercy Tavern, New York, NY
- Northeast Chef: Tim Cushman, O Ya, Boston, MA
- Northwest Chef: Matt Dillon, Sitka & Spruce, Seattle, WA
- Pacific Chef: Matt Molina, Osteria Mozza, Los Angeles, CA
- TIE Southeast Chef: Hugh Acheson, Five and Ten, Athens, GA and Linton Hopkins, Restaurant Eugene, Atlanta, GA
- Southwest Chef: Paul Qui, Uchiko, Austin, TX
- South Chef: Chris Hastings, Hot and Hot Fish Club, Birmingham, AL
- Restaurant Design: Bentel & Bentel Architects, Le Bernardin, New York, NY
- Restaurant Graphics: Pandiscio Co., The Americano at Hôtel Americano, New York, NY

=== Book Awards ===
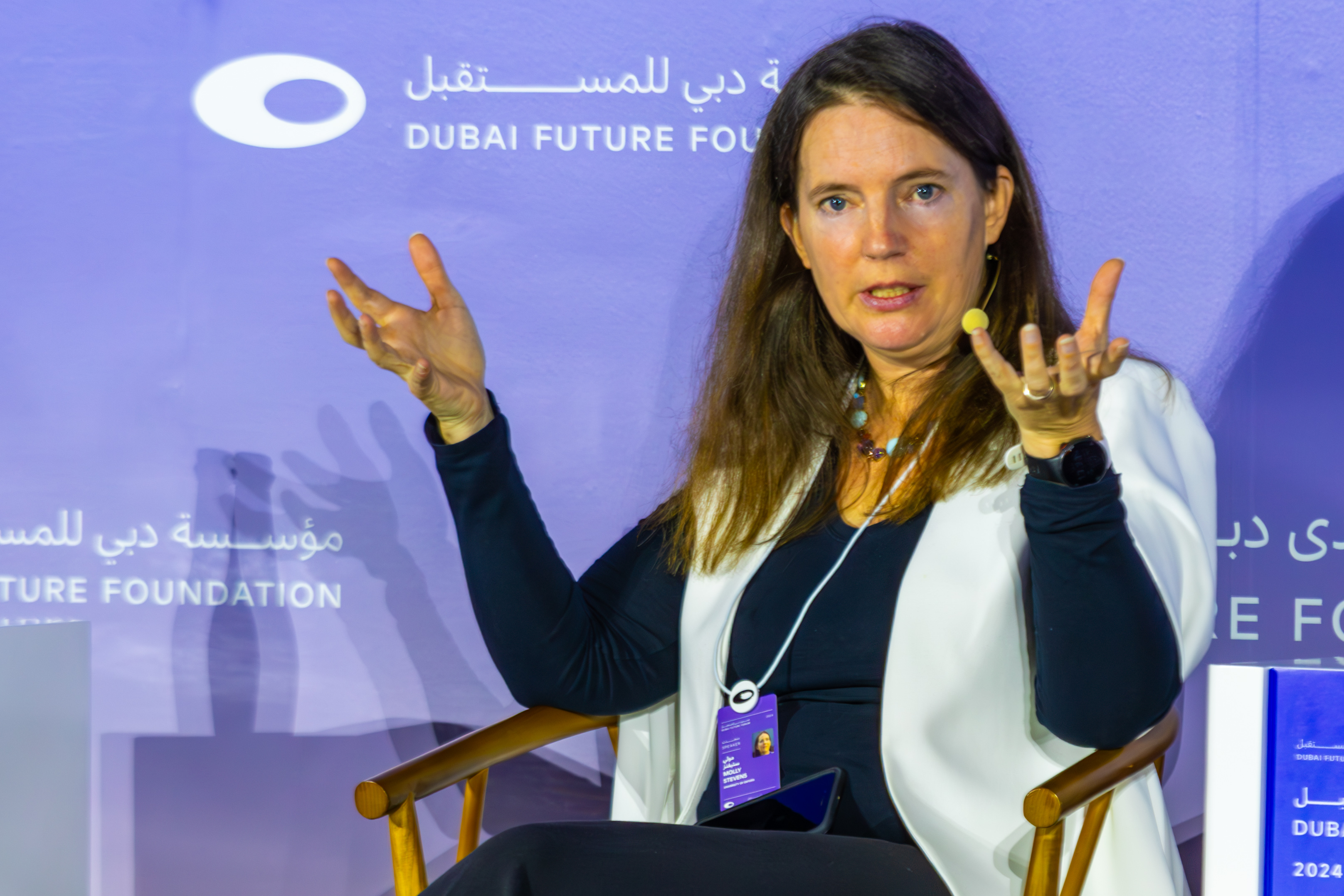
Molly Stevens

Sources:

- Baking and Dessert: Jeni's Splendid Ice Creams at Home by Jeni Britton Bauer
- Cooking from a Professional Point of View: Modernist Cuisine by Nathan Myhrvold with Chris Young and Maxime Bilet
- American Cooking: A New Turn in the South: Southern Flavors Reinvented for your Kitchen by Hugh Acheson
- Beverage: Bitters: A Spirited History of Classic Cure-All, with Cocktails, Recipes & Formulas by Brad Thomas Parsons
- General Cooking: Ruhlman's Twenty by Michael Ruhlman
- International: The Food of Morocco by Paula Wolfert
- Cookbook Hall of Fame: Home Cooking and More Home Cooking by Laurie Colwin
- Cookbook of the Year: Modernist Cuisine by Nathan Myhrvold with Chris Young and Maxime Bilet
- Photography: Notes from a Kitchen: A Journey Inside Culinary Obsession by Jeff Scott
- Reference and Scholarship: Turning the Tables: Restaurants and the Rise of the American Middle Class, 1880-1920 by Andrew P. Haley
- Single Subject: All About Roasting by Molly Stevens
- Focus on Health: Super Natural Every Day: Well-Loved Recipes from my Natural Foods Kitchen by Heidi Swanson
- Writing and Literature: Blood, Bones & Butter: The Inadvertent Education of a Reluctant Chef by Gabrielle Hamilton

=== Journalism Awards ===
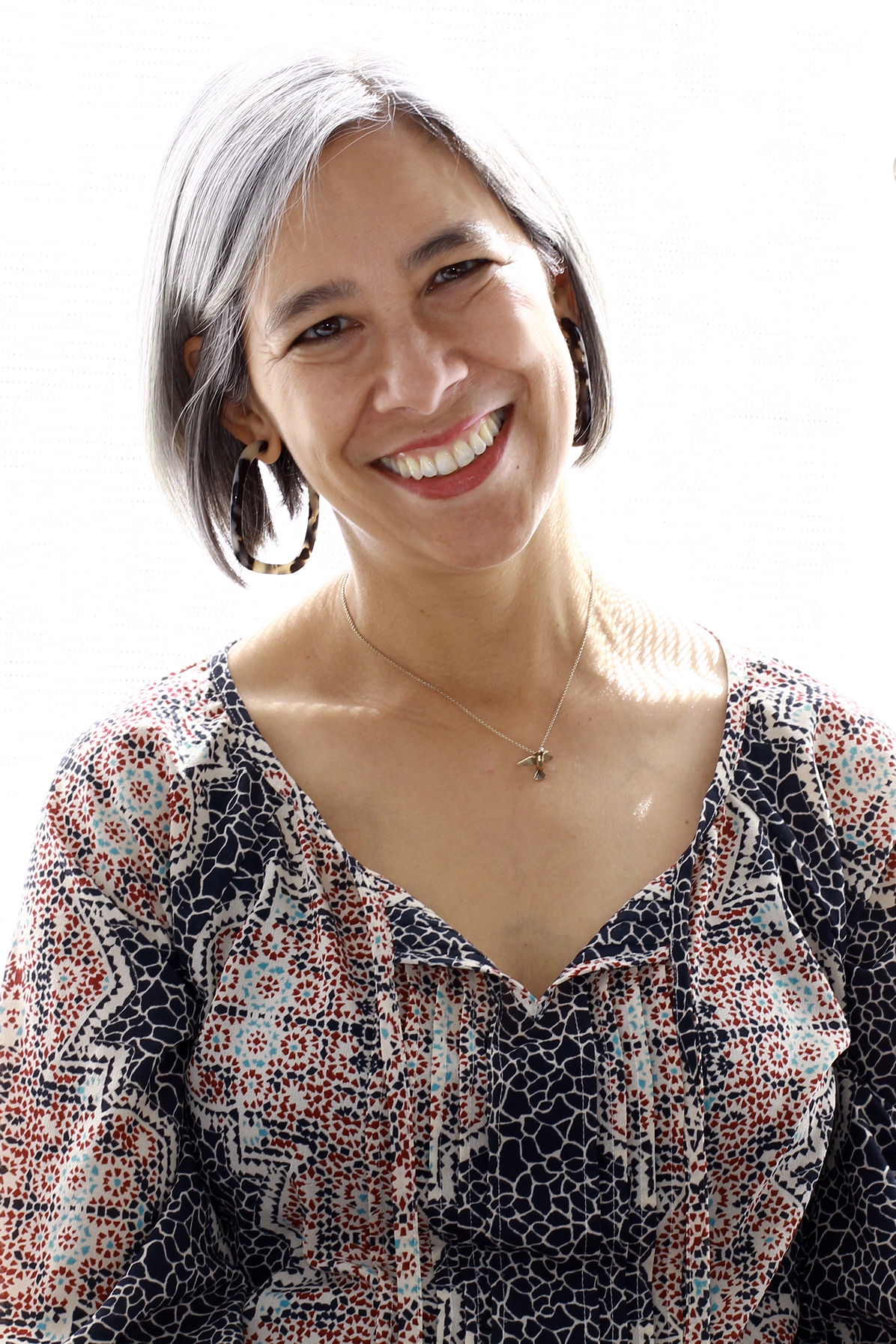
Susan Choi

Sources:

- Publications of the Year: (tie) Amanda Hesser, Food52; Darra Goldstein, Gastronomica
- Cooking, Recipes, or Instruction: Anna Thomas, EatingWell, "The Soup for Life"
- Environment, Food Politics, and Policy: Ben Paynter, Fast Company, "The Sweet Science"
- Food Coverage in a Food-Focused Publication: Saveur, James Oseland
- Food Coverage in a General-Interest Publication: Lesley Bargar Suter, Los Angeles, "Chinese Food in L.A.," "It's Time for Breakfast in L.A," "Food Lovers Guide"
- Food Culture and Travel: Fuchsia Dunlop, The Financial Times, "Global Menu: Kicking Up a Stink"
- Food-Related Columns: Lettie Teague, The Wall Street Journal, On Wine: Lettie Teague: "Drink, Memory: How to Remember that Wine"; "In Praise of the One-Cabernet Lunch"; "May I recommend: Lessons of Great Sommeliers"
- Group Food Blog: The Salt: NPR's Food Blog, Maria Godoy
- Health and Well-Being: Maureen O'Hagan, The Seattle Times, "Feeling the Weight: The Emotional Battle to Control Kids' Diet"
- Humor: Brett Martin, GQ, "The Hangover Part III"
- Individual Food Blog: Poor Man's Feast, Elissa Altman, "Craving the Food of Depravity"
- Personal Essay: Cal Fussman, Esquire.com, "Drinking at 1,300 Ft: A 9/11 Story About Wine and Wisdom"
- Profile: Susan Choi, Food & Wine, "The Spice Wizardry of Lior Lev Sercarz"
- Visual Storytelling: Landon Nordeman, Saveur, "Soul of Sicily," "BBQ Nation," "Heart of the Valley"
- Wine, Spirits, and Other Beverages: Sarah Karnasiewicz, Imbibe, "Fizzy Business"
- Distinguished Restaurant Review Award: Alan Richman, GQ, "The Very Tasty Liberation of Paris," "I Heart SF," "Diner for Schmucks"
- MFK Fisher Distinguished Writing Award: John T. Edge, Saveur, "BBQ Nation"

=== Broadcast Media Awards ===
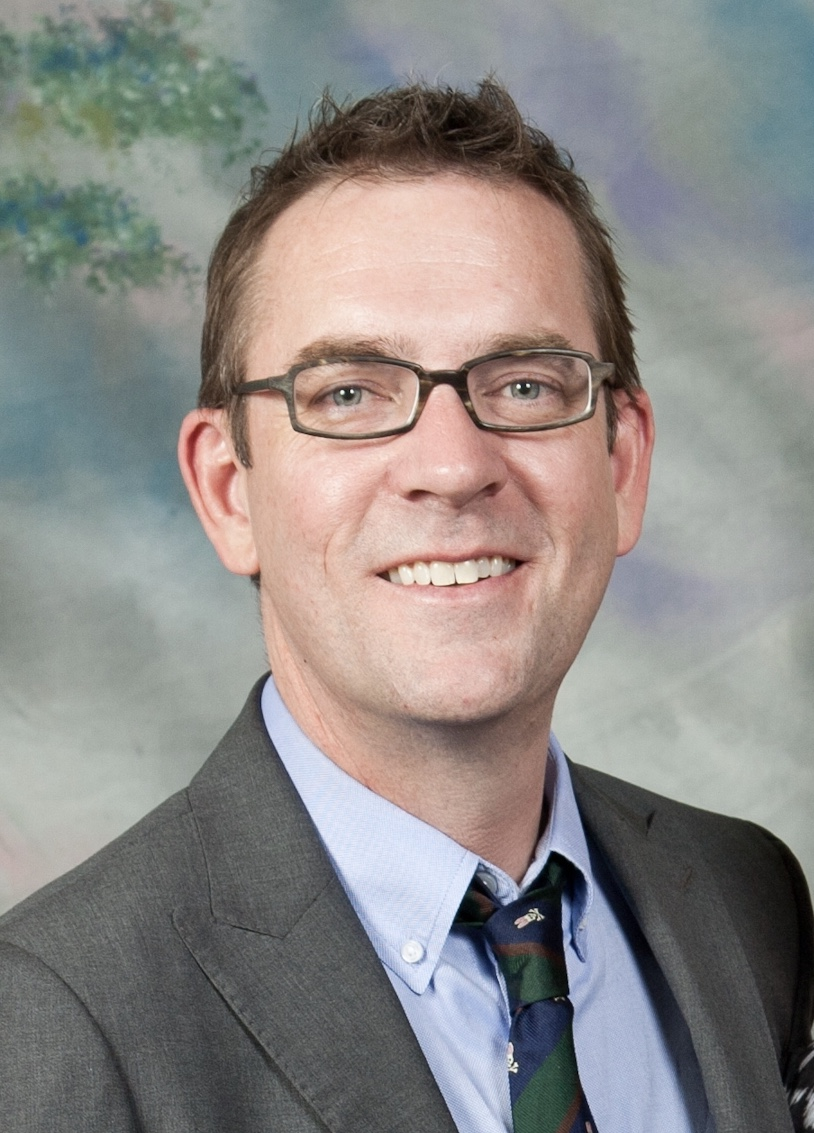
Ted Allen

Sources:

- Radio Show/Audio Webcast: Fear of Frying: Culinary Nightmares, Host: Nina Barrett, WBEZ, Producer: Jason Marck
- Special/Documentary (Television or Video Webcast): A Matter of Taste: Serving Up Paul Liebrandt, HBO, Producers: Sally Rowe, Rachel Mills, and Alan Oman
- Television Program, In Studio or Fixed Location: Chopped, Host: Ted Allen, Food Network, Producers: Linda Lea, Dave Noll, and Vivian Sorenson
- Television Program, On Location: Bizarre Foods with Andrew Zimmern, Host: Andrew Zimmern, Travel Channel
- Television Segment: CBS News Sunday Morning, Host: Martha Teichner, CBS, Producers: Lauren Barnello, Jon Carras, Edward Forgotson, Patrick Lee, and David Small
- Video Webcast: eatTV with Jamie Tiampo, Producers: Suzanne Glickstein, Jimmy McCoy, and Jamie Tiampo
- Media Personality/Host (Television or Video Webcast): Ted Allen, Chopped, Food Network

== 2013 awards ==
The James Beard Awards were presented on May 6, 2013, at New York's Lincoln Center and hosted by Stanley Tucci. The book, broadcast, and journalism winners were announced at Gotham Hall on May 3, 2013.

=== Chef and Restaurant Awards ===
Sources:

- Outstanding Chef: David Chang, Momofuku Noodle Bar, New York, NY; Paul Kahan, Blackbird, Chicago, IL (Tied)
- Lifetime Achievement Award: Cecilia Chiang, San Francisco, CA
- Humanitarian of the Year: Emeril Lagasse, Emeril Lagasse Foundation, New Orleans, LA
- Outstanding Restaurant: Blue Hill Restaurant, New York, NY
- New Restaurant: State Bird Provisions, San Francisco, CA
- Outstanding Restaurateur: Maguy Le Coze, Le Bernardin, New York, NY
- Outstanding Bar Program: The Aviary, Chicago, IL
- Outstanding Wine, Beer, or Spirits Professional: Merry Edwards, Merry Edwards Winery, Sebastopol, CA
- Outstanding Wine Program: Frasca Food and Wine, Boulder, CO
- Rising Star Chef: Danny Bowien, Mission Chinese Food, San Francisco, CA and New York, NY
- Great Lakes Chef: Stephanie Izard, Girl & the Goat, Chicago, IL
- Mid-Atlantic Chef: Johnny Monis, Komi, Washington, D.C.
- Midwest Chef: Colby Garrelts, Bluestem, Kansas City, MO
- New York City Chef: Wylie Dufresne, wd~50, New York, NY
- Northeast Chef: Melissa Kelly, Primo, Rockland, ME
- Northwest Chef: Gabriel Rucker, Le Pigeon, Portland, OR
- South Chef: Tory McPhail, Commander's Palace, New Orleans, LA
- Southeast Chef: Joseph Lenn, The Barn at Blackberry Farm, Walland, TN
- Southwest Chef: Jennifer Jasinski, Rioja, Denver, CO
- West Chef: Christopher Kostow, The Restaurant at Meadowood, St. Helena, CA
- Restaurant Design and Graphics: 75 Seats and Under: Isa, Taavo Somer, Brooklyn, NY.
- Restaurant Design and Graphics: 76 Seats and Over: Juvia, Alejandro Barrios Carrero Designs, Miami Beach

=== Broadcast and New Media Awards ===
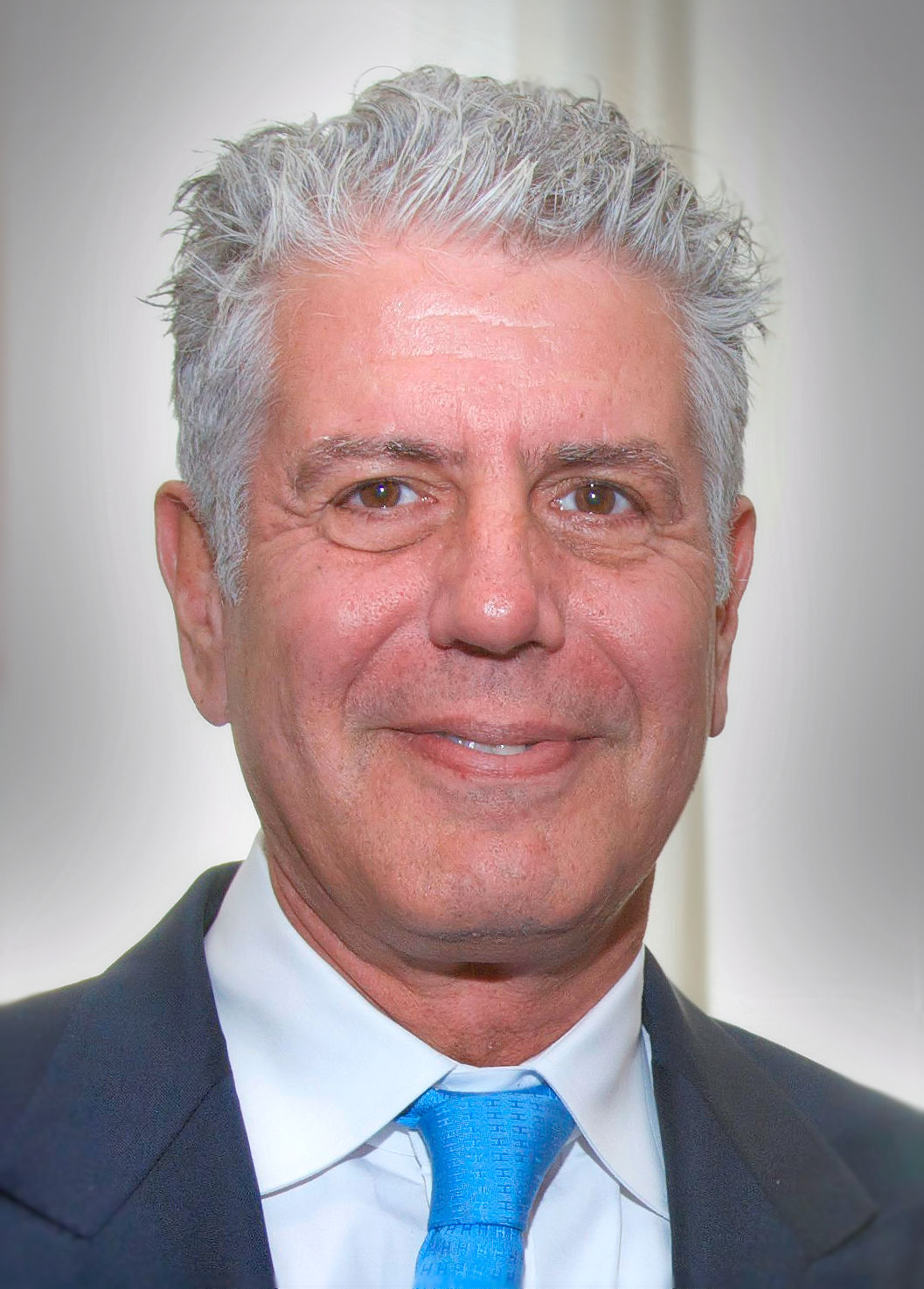
Anthony Bourdain

Sources:

- Radio Show/Audio Webcast: Fear of Frying; Host: Nina Barrett; Area: WBEZ; Producer: Lynette Kalsnes
- Special/Documentary, Television or Video Webcast: The Restaurateur; Network: PBS; Producer: Roger Sherman (filmmaker)
- Television Program, In Studio or Fixed Location: CBS Sunday Morning: "Eat, Drink and Be Merry"; Host: Charles Osgood; Network: CBS; Producers: Gavin Boyle, Amol Mhatre, Rand Morrison, Amy Rosner, Jason Sacca, and Robin Sanders
- Television Program, On Location: The Mind of a Chef; Host: Anthony Bourdain; Network: PBS; Producers: Anthony Bourdain, Joe Caterini, Alexandra Chaden, Jonathan Cianfrani, Christopher Collins, Peter Meehan, Michael Steed, and Lydia Tenaglia
- Television Segment: Friday Arts, Art of Food; Network: WHYY-TV TV; Producer: Monica Rogozinski
- Video Webcast, Fixed Location and/or Instructional: Liquor.com Presents How to Cocktail; Producers: Kit Codik, Scott Kritz and Noah Rothbaum
- Video Webcast, On Location: Theperennialplate.com presents The Perennial Plate: Real Food World Tour; Hosts and Producers: Daniel Klein and Mirra Fine
- Outstanding Personality/Host: Andrew Zimmern; Show: Bizarre Foods America; Network: Travel Channel

=== Book Awards ===
Sources:

- Cookbook of the Year: Gran Cocina Latina: The Food of Latin America by Maricel Presilla
- Cookbook Hall of Fame: Anne Willan for her body of work
- American Cooking: Mastering the Art of Southern Cooking by Nathalie Dupree and Cynthia Graubart
- Baking and Dessert: Flour Water Salt Yeast: The Fundamentals of Artisan Bread and Pizza by Ken Forkish
- Beverage: Wine Grapes: A Complete Guide to 1,368 Vine Varieties, Including Their Origins and Flavours by Jancis Robinson, Julia Harding, and José Vouillamoz
- Cooking from a Professional Point of View: Toqué! Creators of a New Quebec Gastronomy by Normand Laprise
- Focus on Health: Cooking Light The New Way to Cook Light: Fresh Food & Bold Flavors for Today's Home Cook by Scott Mowbray and Ann Taylor Pittman
- General Cooking: Canal House Cooks Every Day by Melissa Hamilton and Christopher Hirsheimer
- International: Jerusalem: A Cookbook by Yotam Ottolenghi & Sami Tamimi
- Photography: What Katie Ate: Recipes and Other Bits & Pieces, Photographer: Katie Quinn Davies
- Reference and Scholarship: The Art of Fermentation: An In-Depth Exploration of Essential Concepts and Processes from Around the World by Sandor Ellix Katz
- Single Subject: Ripe: A Cook in the Orchard by Nigel Slater
- Vegetable Focused and Vegetarian: Roots: The Definitive Compendium with More Than 225 Recipes by Diane Morgan
- Writing and Literature: Yes, Chef: A Memoir by Marcus Samuelsson

=== Journalism Awards ===
Sources:

- Publication of the Year Award: ChopChop
- Cooking, Recipes, or Instruction: Matt Goulding, Matthew Kadey with Tamar Adler, and Paul Kita, Men's Health, "The Butcher Is Back!," "The Six-Pack Foods of Summer," "Southern Food Rises Again"
- Craig Claiborne Distinguished Restaurant Review Award: Tejal Rao, Village Voice, "Bangkok Pop, No Fetishes," "The Sweet Taste of Success," "Enter the Comfort Zone at 606 R&D"
- Food and Culture: Ann Taylor Pittman, Cooking Light, "Mississippi Chinese Lady Goes Home to Korea"
- Food and Travel: Adam Sachs, Travel + Leisure, "The Best Little Eating Town in Europe"
- Food Coverage in a General-Interest Publication: Men's Health, Adina Steiman
- Food Politics, Policy, and the Environment: Tracie McMillan, The American Prospect with the Food & Environment Reporting Network, "As Common As Dirt"
- Food-Related Columns: Adam Sachs, Bon Appétit, The Obsessivore: "I'm Big On Japan," "Everyone's a Critic," "The Tradition Starts Here"
- Group Food Blog: Dark Rye, darkrye.com
- Health and Well-Being: Rachael Moeller Gorman, EatingWell, "Solving the Sugar Puzzle"
- Humor: Alice Laussade, Dallas Observer, "The Cheap Bastard's Ultimate Guide to Eating like a Total Cheap Bastard in Dallas"
- Individual Food Blog: Hunter Angler Gardener Cook, honest-food.net, Hank Shaw
- MFK Fisher Distinguished Writing Award: Mike Sula, Chicago Reader, "Chicken of the Trees"
- Personal Essay: Fuchsia Dunlop, Lucky Peach, "London Town"
- Profile: Brett Martin, GQ, "Danny and the Electric Kung Pao Pastrami Test"
- Visual Storytelling: Michele Outland and Fiorella Valdesolo, Gather Journal, "Starters," "Dessert," "Smoke & Ash"
- Wine, Spirits, and other Beverages: Michael Steinberger, vanityfair.com, "A Vintage Crime"

== 2014 awards ==
The James Beard Awards were presented on May 5, 2014, at New York's Lincoln Center and hosted by Ted Allen. The book, broadcast, and journalism winners were announced at Gotham Hall on May 2, 2014 and hosted by Mat Lee and Ted Lee.

=== Chef and Restaurant Awards ===
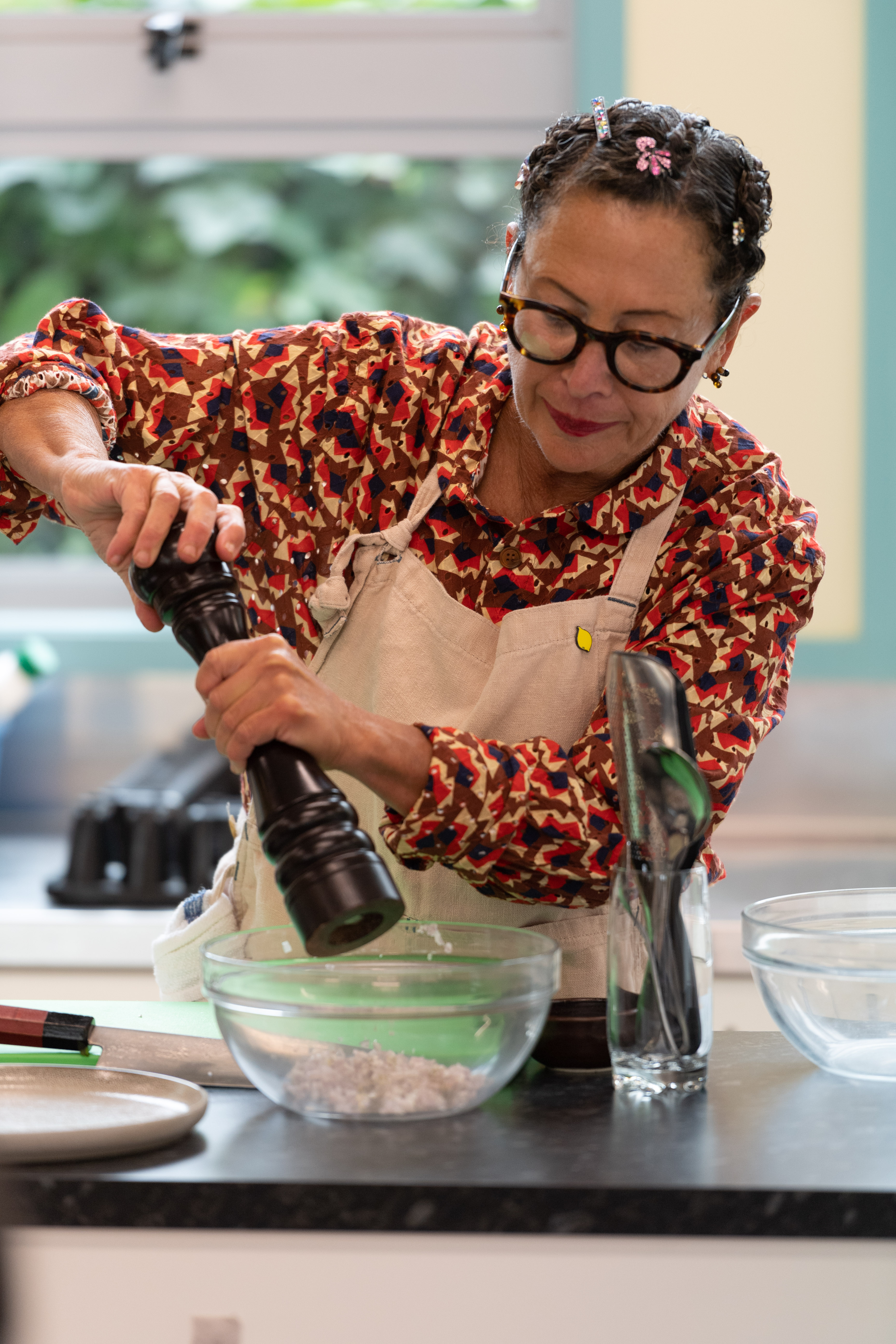
Nancy Silverton

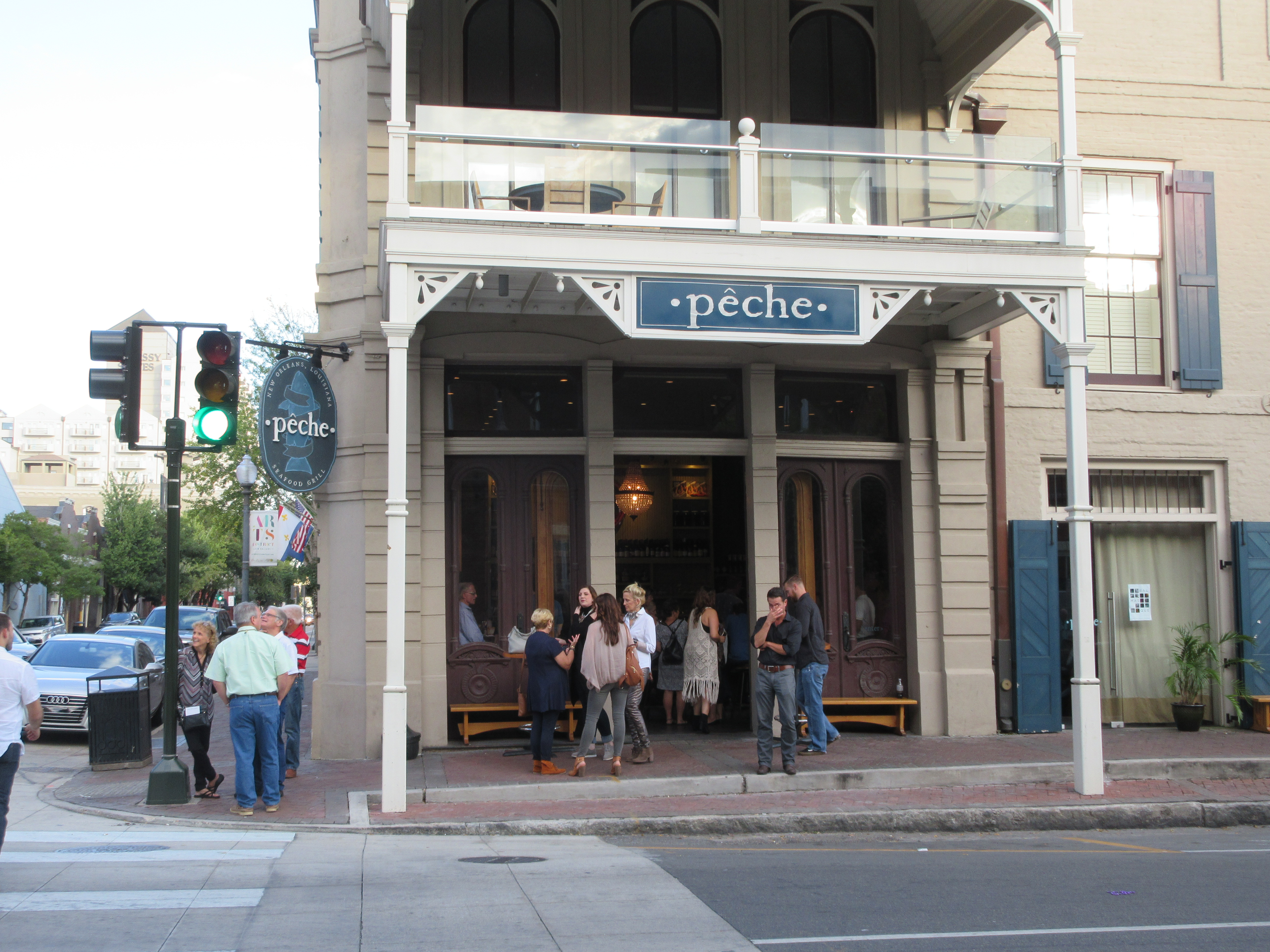
Peche Seafood Grill, New Orleans

Sources:

- Outstanding Chef: Nancy Silverton, Pizzeria Mozza, Los Angeles, CA
- Lifetime Achievement Award: Sirio Maccioni, Le Cirque, New York, NY
- Humanitarian of the Year: Matt Haley, Rehoboth Beach, DE
- Outstanding Restaurant: The Slanted Door, San Francisco, CA
- America's Classics: Hansen's Sno Bliz, New Orleans, LA; Sokolowski's University Inn, Cleveland, OH; Nick's Italian Cafe, McMinnville, OR; Olneyville New York System, Providence, RI
- Rising Star Chef: Jimmy Banos Jr., The Purple Pig, Chicago, IL; Blaine Wetzel, Willows Inn, Lummi Island, WA
- Outstanding Restaurateur: Barbara Lynch, Barbara Lynch Gruppo, Boston, MA
- Outstanding Pastry Chef: Dominique Ansel, Dominique Ansel Bakery, New York, NY
- Outstanding Service: The Restaurant at Meadowood, St. Helena, CA
- Outstanding Bar Program: The Bar at the NoMad Hotel, New York, NY
- Outstanding Wine Program: The Barn at Blackberry Farm, Walland, TN
- Outstanding Wine, Beer, or Spirits Professional: Garrett Oliver, Brooklyn Brewery, Brooklyn, NY
- Best New Restaurant: Peche Seafood Grill, New Orleans, LA
- Great Lakes Chef: Dave Beran, Next, Chicago, IL
- Mid-Atlantic Chef: Vikram Sunderam, Rasika, Washington, D.C.
- Midwest Chef: Justin Aprahamian, Milwaukee, WI
- New York City Chef: April Bloomfield, The Spotted Pig, New York, NY
- Northeast Chef: Jamie Bissonnette, Coppa, Boston, MA
- Northwest Chef: Naomi Pomeroy, Beast, Portland, OR
- South Chef: Ryan Prewitt, Peche Seafood Grill, New Orleans, LA; Sue Zemanick, Gautreau's, New Orleans, LA
- Southeast Chef: Ashley Christensen, Poole's Downtown Diner, Raleigh, NC
- Southwest Chef: Chris Shepherd, Underbelly, Houston, TX
- West Chef: Daniel Patterson, Coi, San Francisco, CA

=== Broadcast and New Media Awards ===
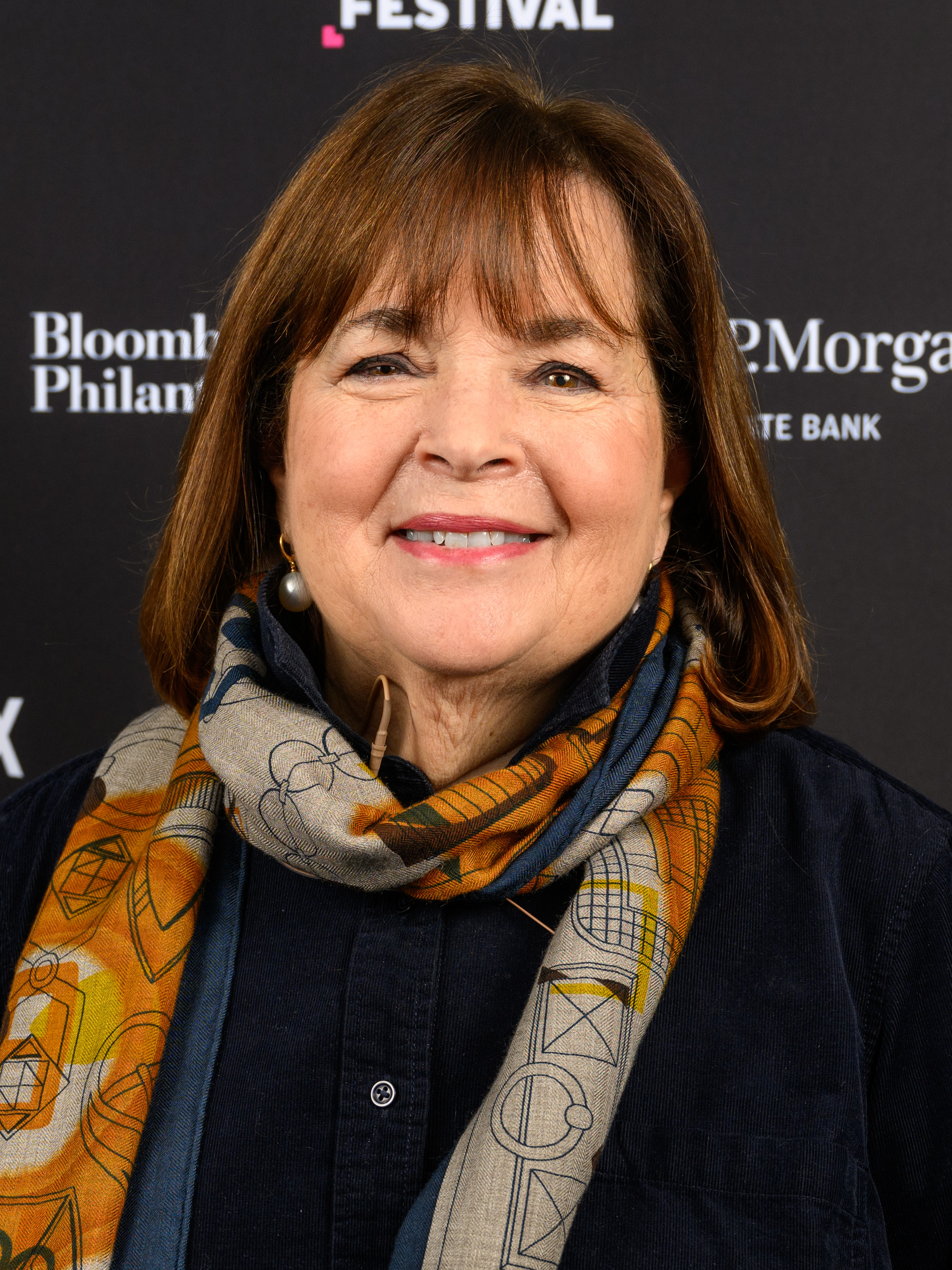
Ina Garten

Sources:

- Radio Show/Audio Webcast: This American Life; Host: Ben Calhoun; Area: Public Radio; Producer: Ben Calhoun
- Special/Documentary: Eating Alabama; Network: PBS; Producers: Andrew Beck Grace and Bartley Powers
- Television Program, In Studio or Fixed Location: Martha's Stewart's Cooking School; Host: Martha Stewart; Network: CBS; Producers: Greta Anthony, Christina Deyo, Michael Morrison, Olivia Schneider, Martha Stewart, Calia Van Dyk, and Lisa Wagner
- Television Program, On Location: The Mind of a Chef; Host: Anthony Bourdain; Network: PBS; Producers: Jared Andrukanis, Anthony Bourdain, Joe Caterini, Chris Collins, Michael Steed, and Lydia Tenaglia
- Television Segment: Friday Arts, Art of Food; Network: WHYY-TV TV; Producer: Monica Rogozinski
- Video Webcast, Fixed Location and/or Instructional: Thirsty For...; Producers: Jay Holzer and Eric Slatkin
- Video Webcast, On Location: Theperennialplate.com presents The Perennial Plate: Europe and South Asia; Hosts and Producers: Daniel Klein and Mirra Fine
- Outstanding Personality/Host: Ina Garten; Show: Barefoot Contessa: Back to Basics; Network: Food Network

=== Book Awards ===
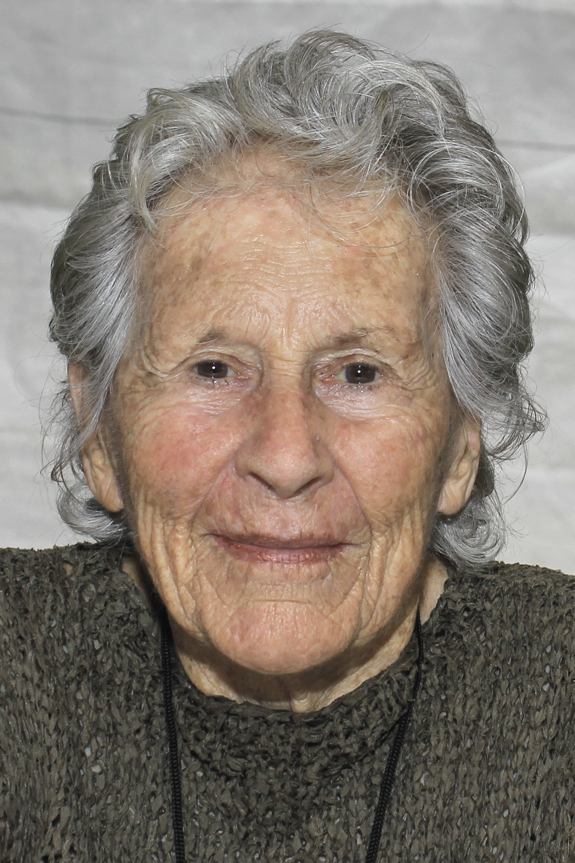
Diana Kennedy

Sources:

- Cookbook of the Year: Historic Heston by Heston Blumenthal
- Cookbook Hall of Fame: Diana Kennedy
- American Cooking: The New Midwestern Table: 200 Heartland Recipes by Amy Thielen
- Baking and Dessert: The Art of French Pastry by Jacquy Pfeiffer with Martha Rose Shulman
- Beverage: The Cocktail Lab: Unraveling the Mysteries of Flavor and Aroma in Drink, with Recipes by Tony Conigliaro
- Cooking from a Professional Point of View: Historic Heston by Heston Blumenthal
- Focus on Health: Gluten-Free Girl Every Day by Shauna James Ahern with Daniel Ahern
- General Cooking: Smoke: New Firewood Cooking by Tim Byres
- International: Every Grain of Rice: Simple Chinese Home Cooking by Fuchsia Dunlop
- Photography: Historic Heston, Photographer: Romas Foord; Rene Redzepi: A Work in Progress, Photographer: Ali Kurshat Altinsoy, Ditte Isager, René Redzepi, Lars Williams, and the Noma Team
- Reference and Scholarship: Soul Food: The Surprising Story of an American Cuisine One Plate at a Time by Adrian Miller
- Single Subject: Culinary Birds: The Ultimate Poultry Cookbook by John Ash with James O. Fraioli
- Vegetable Focused and Vegetarian: Vegetable Literacy by Deborah Madison
- Writing and Literature: Salt Sugar Fat: How the Food Giants Hooked Us by Michael Moss

=== Journalism Awards ===
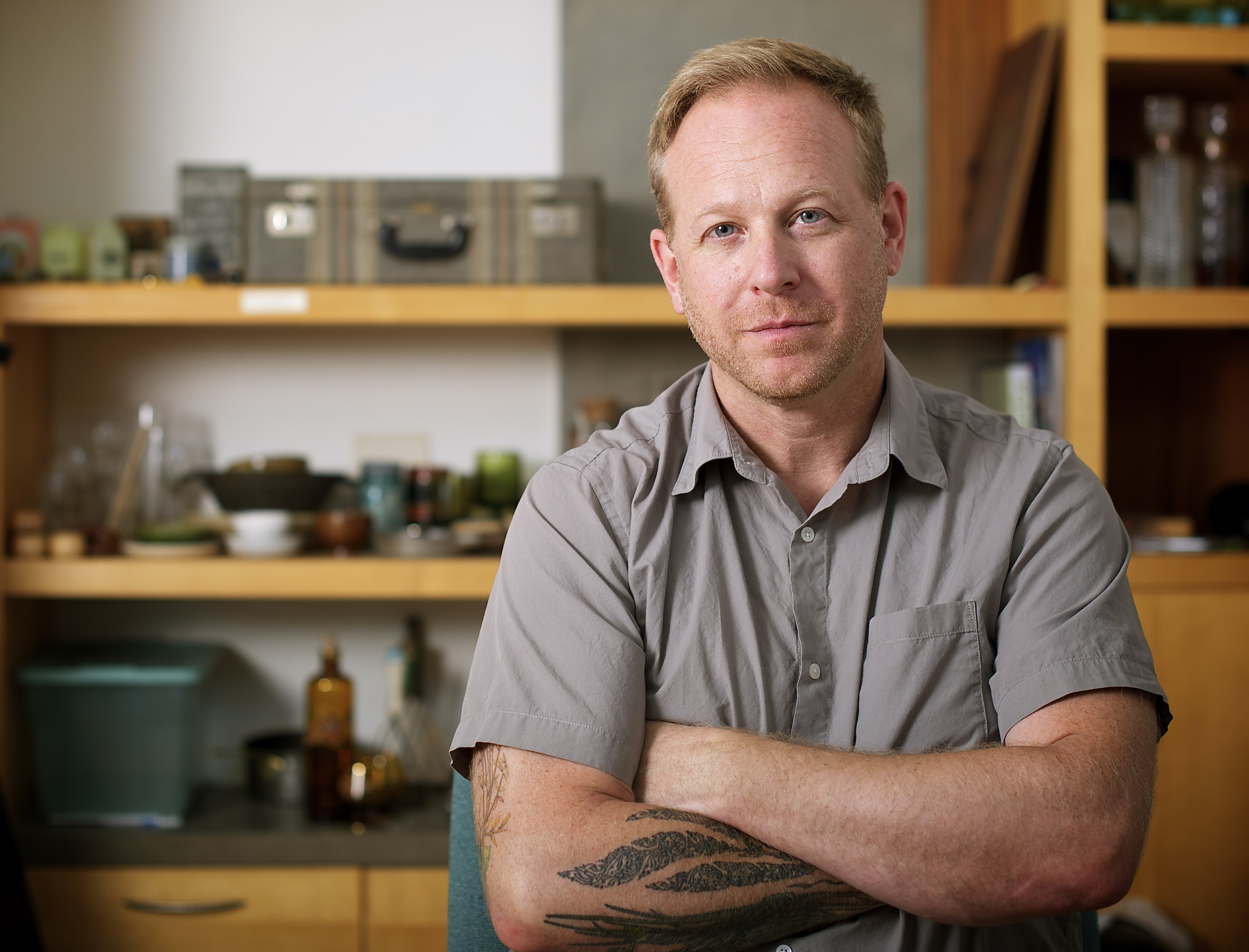
Andy Ricker

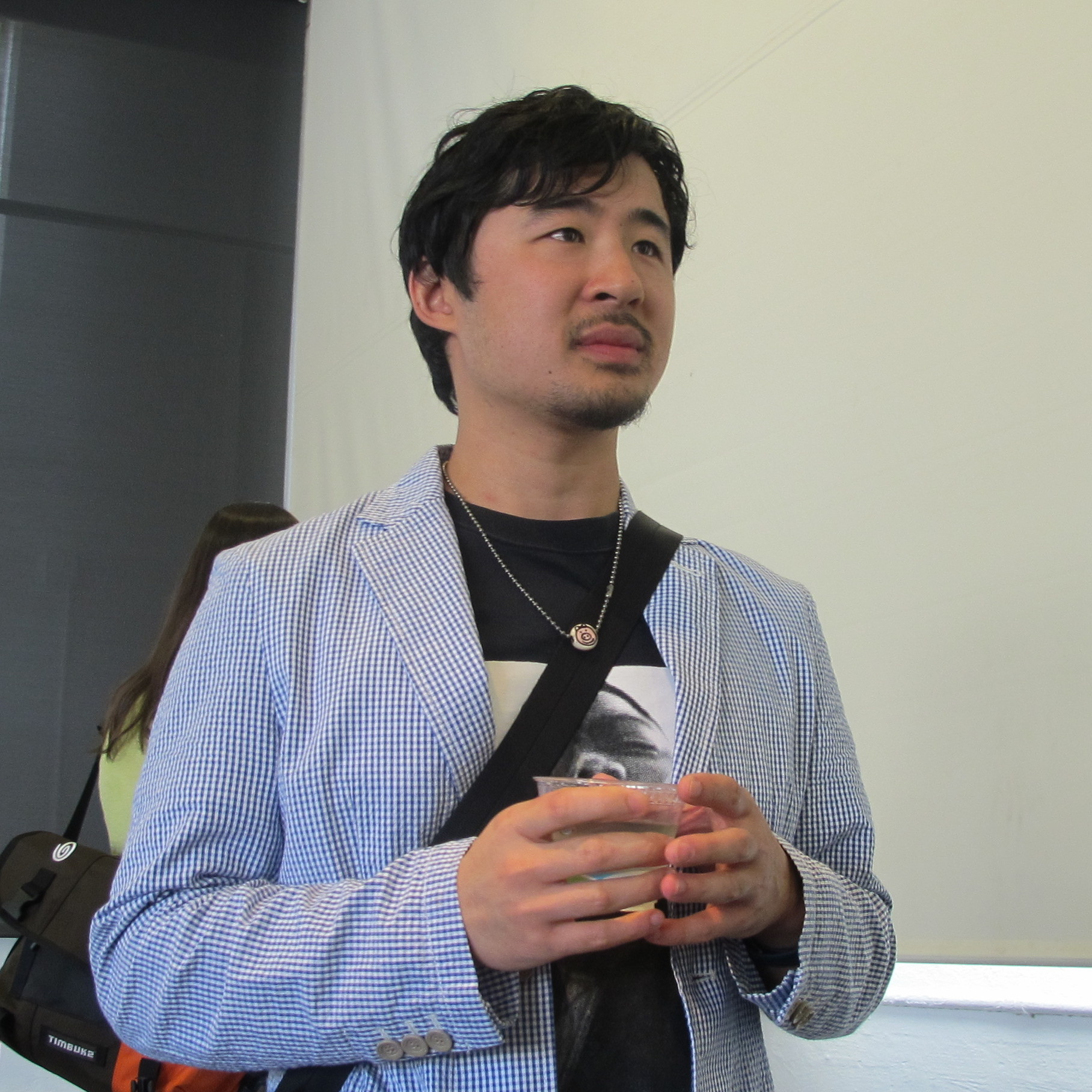
Francis Lam

Sources:

- Cooking, Recipes or Instruction: Andy Ricker, Saveur, "The Star of Siam"
- Distinguished Restaurant Review: Alan Richman, GQ, "Alan Richman Walks Into a Jewish Deli...", "The Elm: Is Brooklyn Ready for Sophisticated Dining?", "ZZ's, the Most Expensive 58 Minutes in New York Dining"
- Food and Culture: John Birdsall, Lucky Peach, "America, Your Food Is So Gay"
- Food and Travel: Nick Paumgarten, Bon Appétit, "Lunch at 8,500 Ft."
- Food Coverage in a General-Interest Publication: The Wall Street Journal, "Off Duty" Section, Beth Kracklauer
- Food Politics, Policy, and the Environment: Eli Saslow, The Washington Post, "Food Stamps"
- Food-Related Columns: Adam Sachs, Bon Appétit, The Obsessivore
- Group Food Blog: First We Feast
- Health and Well-Being: Rachael Moeller Gorman, EatingWell, "The Whole-Grain, Reduced-Fat, Zero-Calorie, High-Fiber, Lightly Sweetened Truth about Food Labels"
- Humor: Lisa Hanawalt, Lucky Peach, "On the Trail with Wylie"
- Individual Food Blog: Homesick Texan, Lisa Fain
- Distinguished Writing: John Jeremiah Sullivan, Lucky Peach, "I Placed a Jar in Tennessee
- Personal Essay: Fuchsia Dunlop, Lucky Peach, "Dick Soup"
- Profile: Francis Lam, Lucky Peach, "A Day on Long Island with Alex Lee"
- Publication of the Year: Civil Eats
- Visual Storytelling: James Maikowski, Sara Parks, Patricia Sanchez, Stephen Scoble, and Fredrika Stjärne, Food & Wine, "Best New Chef All Stars", "Oysters & Gumbo: A Chef's New Orleans Party", "Vegetables Now"
- Wine, Spirits, and Other Beverages: Besha Rodell, Punch, "40 Ounces to Freedom"

== 2015 awards ==
The 2015 James Beard Awards were presented on May 4, 2015, at the Civic Opera House and hosted by Alton Brown. The Book, Broadcast and Journalism Award winners were announced at Pier Sixty at Chelsea Piers in New York on April 24 and hosted by Carla Hall.

=== Chef and Restaurant Awards ===
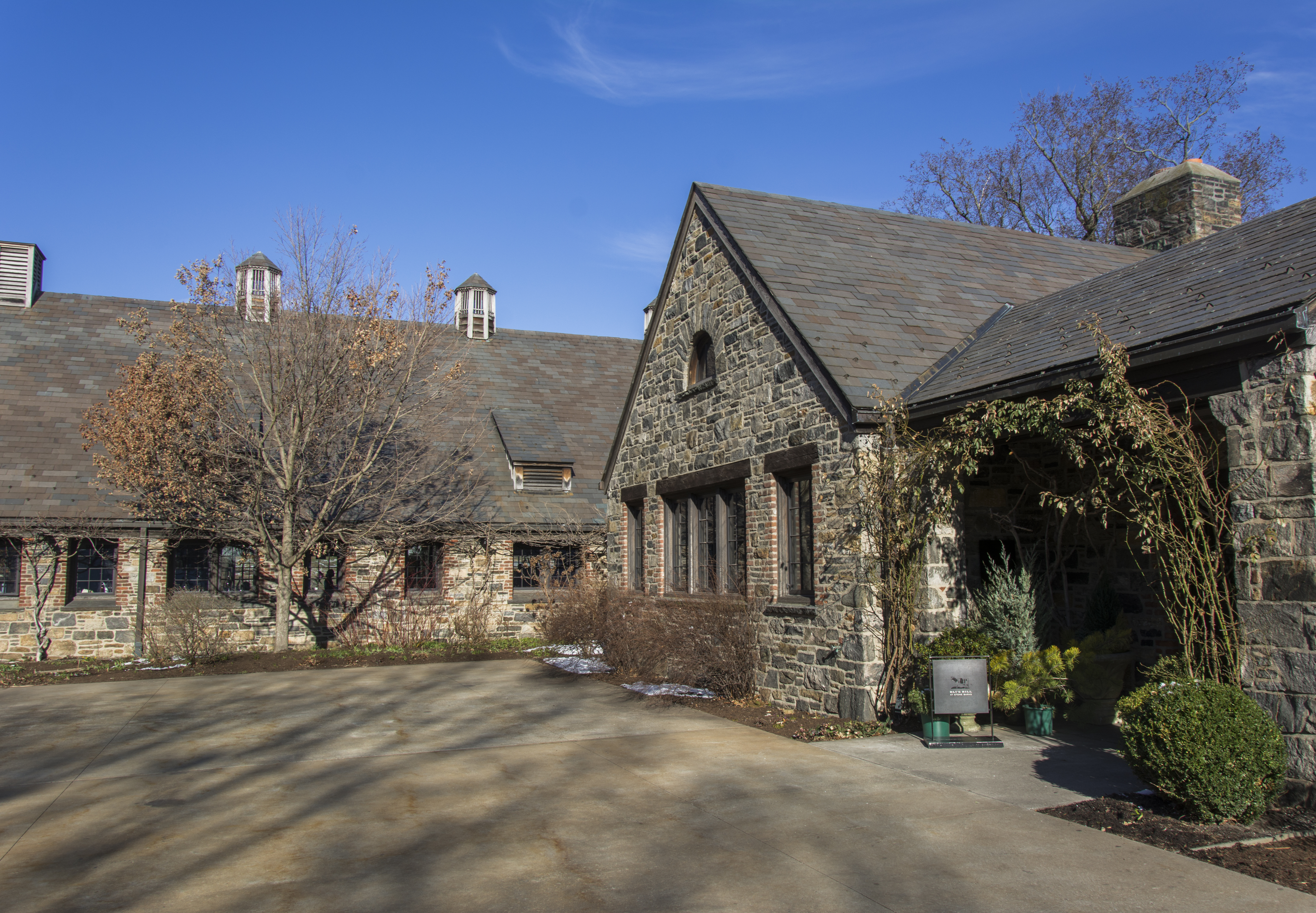
Blue Hill at Stone Barns, Pocantico Hills, New York

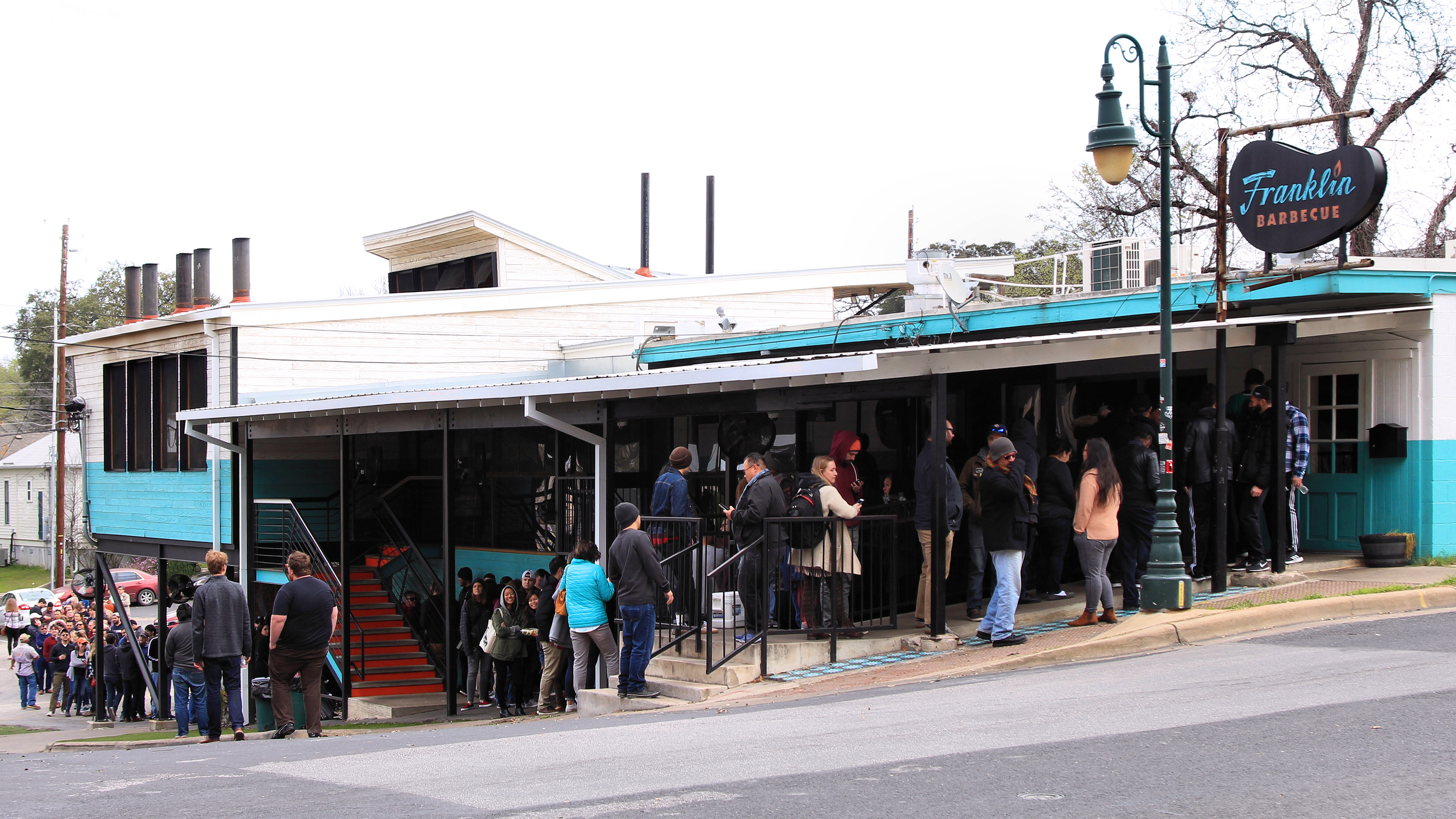
Franklin Barbecue

Sources:

- Outstanding Chef: Michael Anthony, Gramercy Tavern, New York, NY
- Lifetime Achievement Award: Richard Melman, Lettuce Entertain You Enterprises, Chicago, IL
- Humanitarian of the Year: Michel Nischan, Wholesome Wave, Bridgeport, CT
- Outstanding Restaurant: Blue Hill at Stone Barns, Pocantico Hills, NY
- America's Classics: Archie's Waeside, Le Mars, IA; Beaumont Inn, Harrodsburg, KY; Guelaguetza, Los Angeles, CA; Sally Bell's Kitchen, Richmond, VA; Sevilla Restaurant, New York, NY
- Rising Star Chef of the Year: Jessica Largey, Manresa, Los Gatos, CA
- Best New Restaurant: Bâtard, New York, NY
- Outstanding Baker: Jim Lahey, Sullivan Street Bakery, New York, NY
- Outstanding Bar Program: The Violet Hour, Chicago, IL
- Outstanding Pastry Chef: Christina Tosi, Momofuku, New York, NY
- Outstanding Restaurateur: Donnie Madia, One Off Hospitality Group, Chicago, IL
- Outstanding Service: The Barn at Blackberry Farm, Walland, TN
- Outstanding Wine Program: A16, San Francisco, CA
- Outstanding Wine, Beer, or Spirits Professional: Rajat Parr, Mina Group, San Francisco, CA
- Best Chef: Great Lakes: Jonathon Sawyer, The Greenhouse Tavern, Cleveland, OH
- Best Chef: Mid-Atlantic: Spike Gjerde, Woodberry Kitchen, Baltimore, MD
- Best Chef: Midwest: Gerard Craft, Niche, Clayton, MO
- Best Chef: Northeast: Barry Maiden, Hungry Mother, Cambridge, MA
- Best Chef: Northwest: Blaine Wetzel, Willows Inn, Lummi Island, WA
- Best Chef: NYC: Mark Ladner, Del Posto, New York, NY
- Best Chef: South: Alon Shaya, Domenica, New Orleans, LA
- Best Chef: Southeast: Jason Stanhope, Fig, Charleston, SC
- Best Chef: Southwest: Aaron Franklin, Franklin Barbecue, Austin, TX
- Best Chef: West: Stuart Brioza and Nicole Krasinski, State Bird Provisions, San Francisco, CA

=== Book Awards ===
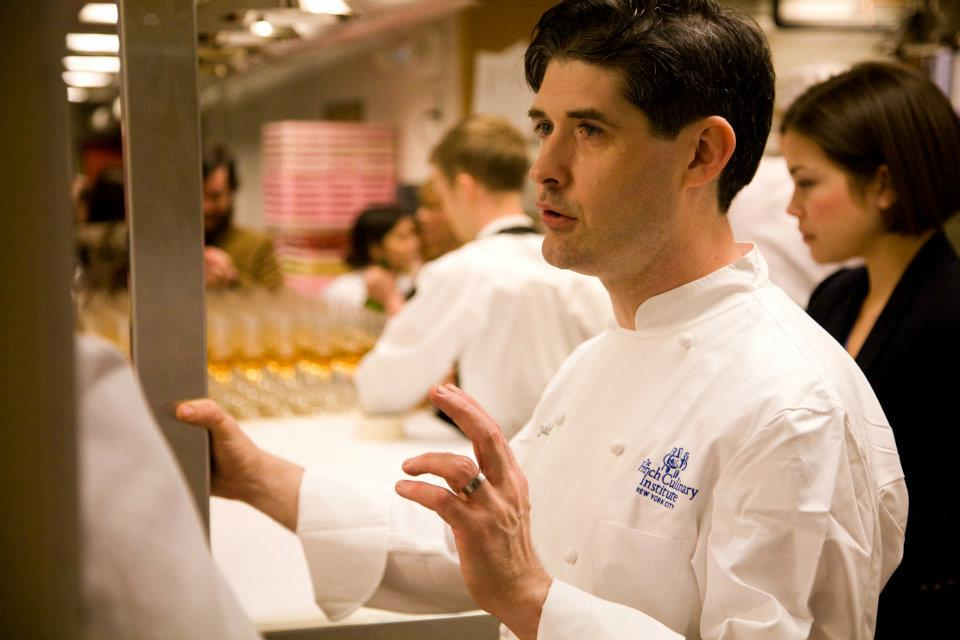
Dave Arnold

Sources:

- Cookbook of the Year: Yucatán: Recipes from a Culinary Expedition by David Sterling
- Cookbook Hall of Fame: Barbara Kafka
- American Cooking: Heritage by Sean Brock
- Baking and Dessert: Flavor Flours: A New Way to Bake with Teff, Buckwheat, Sorghum, Other Whole & Ancient Grains, Nuts & Non-Wheat Flours by Alice Medrich
- Beverage: Liquid Intelligence: The Art and Science of the Perfect Cocktail by Dave Arnold
- Cooking from a Professional Point of View: Bar Tartine: Techniques & Recipes by Nicolaus Balla and Cortney Burns
- Focus on Health: Cooking Light Mad Delicious: The Science of Making Healthy Food Taste Amazing by Keith Schroeder
- General Cooking: The Kitchn Cookbook: Recipes, Kitchens & Tips to Inspire Your Cooking by Faith Durand and Sara Kate Gillingham
- International: Yucatán: Recipes from a Culinary Expedition by David Sterling
- Photography: In Her Kitchen: Stories and Recipes from Grandmas Around the World by Gabriele Galimberti
- Reference and Scholarship: Butchering Poultry, Rabbit, Lamb, Goat, and Pork: The Comprehensive Photographic Guide to Humane Slaughtering and Butchering by Adam Danforth
- Single Subject: Bitter: A Taste of the World's Most Dangerous Flavor, with Recipes by Jennifer McLagan
- Vegetable Focused and Vegetarian: At Home in the Whole Food Kitchen: Celebrating the Art of Eating Well by Amy Chaplin
- Writing and Literature: The Third Plate: Field Notes on the Future of Food by Dan Barber

=== Broadcast Media Awards ===
Sources:

- Podcast: The Feed Podcast; Hosts: Rick Bayless and Steve Dolinsky; Producers: Matt Cunningham and Steve Dolinsky
- Radio Show/Audio Webcast: Hidden Kitchens World; Producers: The Kitchen Sisters (Davia Nelson and Nikki Silva)
- Special/Documentary: Food Chains; Host: Forest Whitaker; Director: Sanjay Rawal; Producers: Hamilton Fish, Smriti Keshari, Eva Longoria, Sanjay Rawal, and Eric Schlosser
- Television Program, in Studio or Fixed Location: Martha Stewart's Cooking School; Host: Martha Stewart; Producers: Greta Anthony, Kimberly Miller Olko, Martha Stewart, Calia Brencsons-Van Dyk, and Lisa Wagner
- Television Program, on Location: The Mind of a Chef; Host: Anthony Bourdain; Producers: Jared Andrukanis, Anthony Bourdain, Joe Caterini, Chris Collins, Michael Steed, and Lydia Tenaglia
- Television Segment: CBS This Morning, "The Dish"; Hosts: Anthony Mason and Vinita Nair; Producers: Brian Applegate, Greg Mirman, and Marci Waldman
- Video Webcast, Fixed Location and/or Instructional: ChefSteps; Hosts: Grant Lee Crilly and Chris Young; Producer: Richard B. Wallace
- Video Webcast, on Location: food.curated; Host: Liza de Guia; Producer: Liza de Guia
- Visual and Technical Excellence: Wall of Fire: A ChefSteps Story; Director: Sandy Smolan; Photographer and Editor: Reva Keller; Producers: Grant Crilly and Chris Young
- Outstanding Personality/Host: Ina Garten; Show: Barefoot Contessa

=== Journalism Awards ===
Sources:

- Publication of the Year: Gravy, a publication of the Southern Foodways Alliance
- Dining and Travel: The India Issue, Saveur
- Food and Culture: "The Toxic, Abusive, Addictive, Supportive, Codependent Relationship Between Chefs and Yelpers," Rebecca Flint Marx, San Francisco Magazine
- Food and Health: "Against the Grain," Michael Specter, The New Yorker
- Food-Related Columns: "Unearthed," Tamar Haspel, The Washington Post
- Food Coverage in a General-Interest Publication: GQ
- Food Politics, Policy, and the Environment: "The Quinoa Quarrel: Who Owns the World's Greatest Superfood?," Lisa M. Hamilton, Harper's
- Group Food Blog: Grub Street
- Home Cooking: "Cabbage Craft," Kathy Gunst, EatingWell
- Humor: "Giving & Thanking," Ben Schott, Bon Appétit
- Individual Food Blog: Orangette, Molly Wizenberg
- Personal Essay: "Life in Chains: Finding Home at Taco Bell," John DeVore, Eater
- Profile: "Élite Meat," Dana Goodyear, The New Yorker
- Visual Storytelling: "Make," Gillian Duffy
- Wine, Spirits, and Other Beverages: "Into the Vines," Gabrielle Hamilton, AFAR, The Washington Post
- Craig Claiborne Distinguished Restaurant Review Award: "Artisanal-Everything Roberta's Defies the Stereotypes" "Once an Icon, Per Se is Showing its Age," "Six Reasons Why Cosme is One of NYC's Most Relevant New Restaurants," Ryan Sutton, Eater
- MFK Fisher Distinguished Writing Award: "Life in Chains: Finding Home at Taco Bell," John DeVore, Eater

== 2016 awards ==
The 2016 James Beard Awards were presented on May 2, 2016, at the Civic Opera House, hosted by Carla Hall. The Book, Broadcast and Journalism Award winners were presented at Pier Sixty at Chelsea Piers in New York City, hosted by Ming Tsai.

=== Chef and Restaurant Awards ===
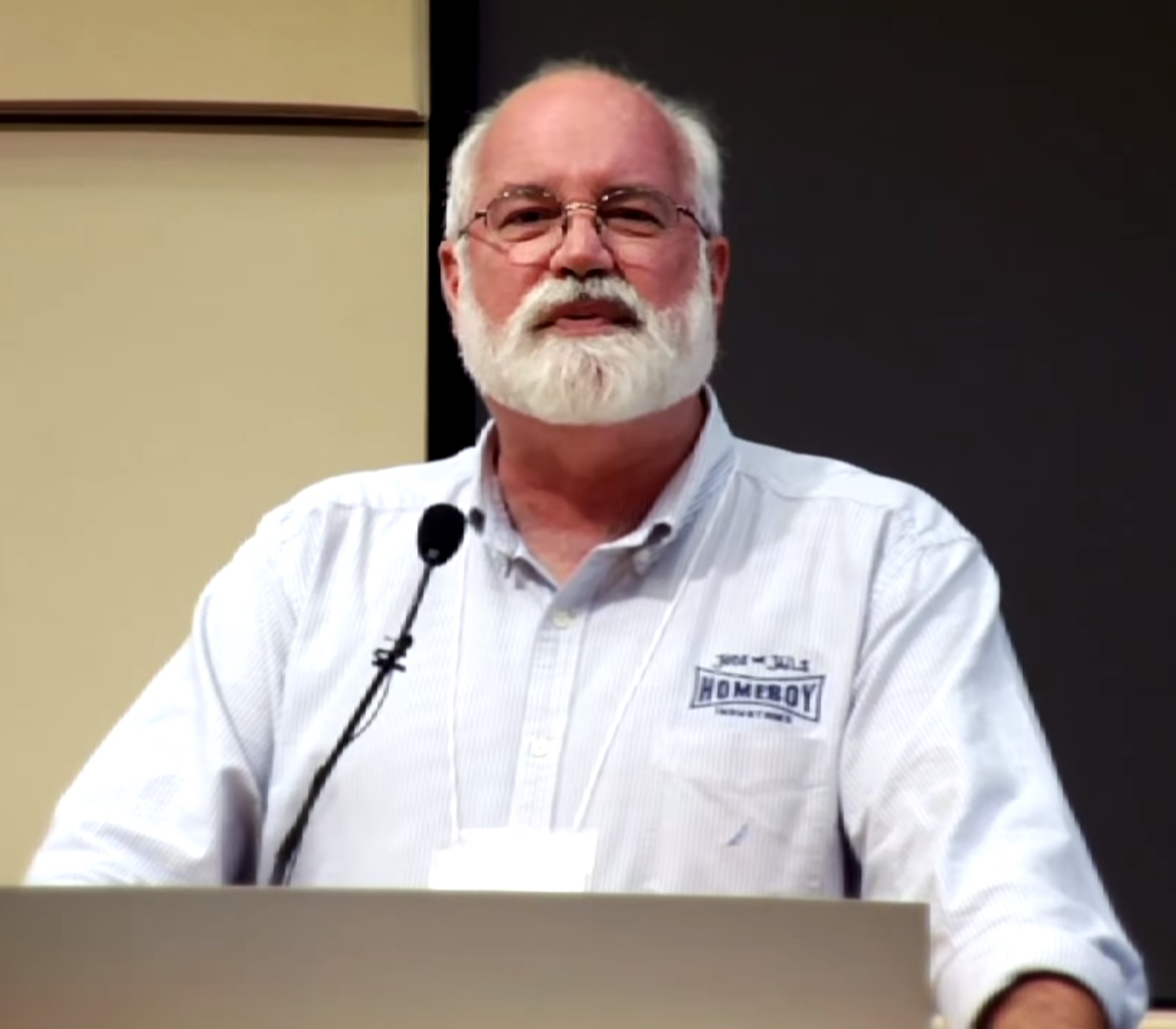
Greg Boyle

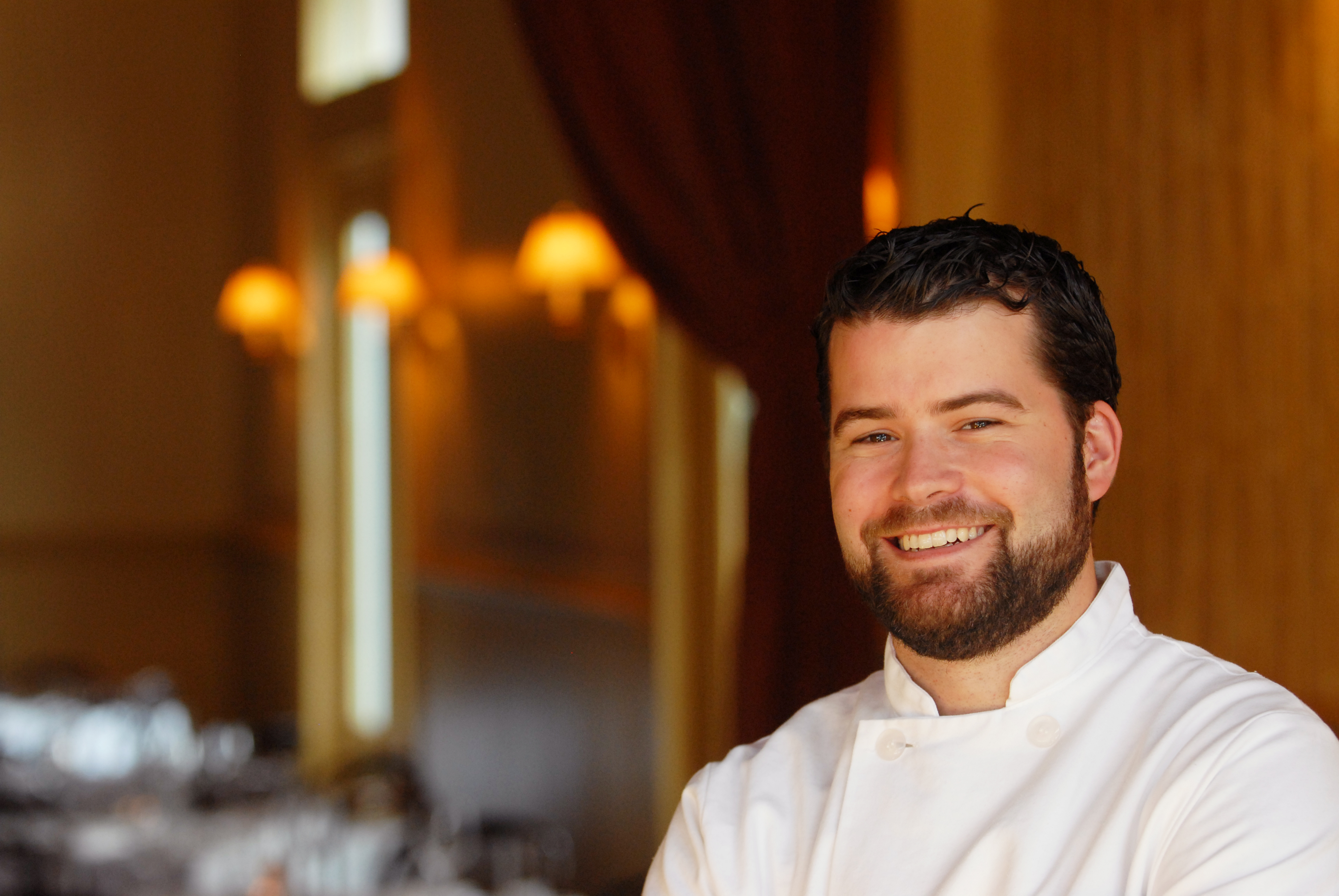
Justin Devillier

Sources:

- Outstanding Chef: Suzanne Goin, Lucques, Los Angeles, CA
- Lifetime Achievement Award: Father Greg Boyle, Homeboy Industries, Los Angeles, CA
- Humanitarian of the Year: Leah Chase, Dooky Chase’s Restaurant, New Orleans, LA
- Outstanding Restaurant: Alinea, Chicago, IL
- Outstanding Bar Program: Maison Premiere, Brooklyn, NY
- Outstanding Baker: Joanne Chang, Flour, Boston, Massachusetts
- Outstanding Pastry Chef: Dahlia Narvaez, Osteria Mozza, Los Angeles, CA
- Outstanding Restaurateur: Ken Friedman, The Spotted Pig, The Breslin, Tosca Café, New York, NY
- Outstanding Service: Eleven Madison Park, New York, NY
- Outstanding Wine Beer or Spirits: Ron Cooper, Del Maguey Single Village Mezcal, Ranchos de Taos, NM
- Outstanding Wine Program: Bern's Steak House, Tampa, FL
- America's Classics: Al Ameer Restaurant, Dearborn, Michigan; Brooks' House of BBQ, Oneonta, New York; Bully's Restaurant, Jackson, Mississippi; Matt's Place Drive-In, Butte, Montana; Rancho de Chimayó Restaurante, Chimayó, New Mexico
- Rising Star Chef of the Year: Daniela Soto-Innes, Cosme, New York, NY
- Best New Restaurant: Shaya, New Orleans, LA
- Best Chef: Mid-Atlantic: Aaron Silverman, Rose's Luxury, Washington, D.C.
- Best Chef: Midwest: Paul Berglund, Bachelor Farmer, Minneapolis, MN.
- Best Chef: Great Lakes: Curtis Duffy, Grace, Chicago, IL
- Best Chef: New York: Jonathan Waxman, Barbuto, New York, NY
- Best Chef: Northeast: Zak Pelaccio, Fish & Game, Hudson, NY
- Best Chef: Northwest: Renee Erickson, The Whale Wins, Seattle, WA
- Best Chef: South: Justin Devillier, La Petite Grocery, New Orleans, LA
- Best Chef: Southeast: Tandy Wilson, City House, Nashville, TN
- Best Chef: Southwest: Justin Yu, Oxheart, Houston, TX
- Best Chef: West: Jon Shook and Vinny Dotolo, Animal, Los Angeles, CA
- Design Icon: The Four Seasons Restaurant, New York, NY

=== Book Awards ===
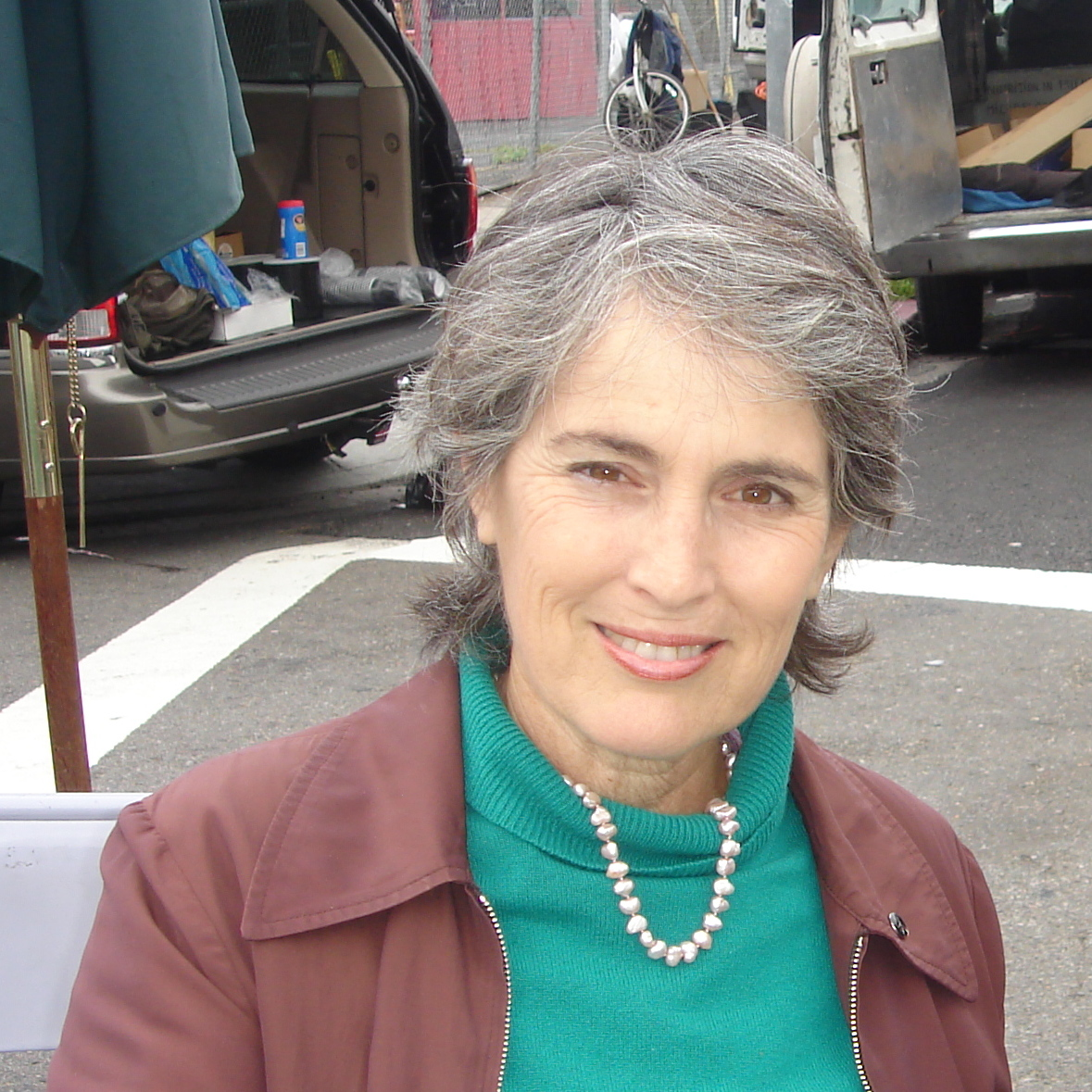
Deborah Madison

Sources:

- American Cooking: The Beetlebung Farm Cookbook by Chris Fischer with Catherine Young (Little, Brown and Company)
- Baking and Dessert: Sourdough: Recipes for Rustic Fermented Breads, Sweets, Savories, and More by Sarah Owens (Roost Books)
- Beverage: The Oxford Companion to Wine by Jancis Robinson and Julia Harding (Oxford University Press)
- Cooking from a Professional Point of View: NOPI: The Cookbook by Yotam Ottolenghi and Ramael Scully (Ten Speed Press)
- Focus on Health: Lighten Up, Y'all: Classic Southern Recipes Made Healthy and Wholesome by Virginia Willis (Ten Speed Press)
- General Cooking: The Food Lab: Better Home Cooking Through Science by J. Kenji López-Alt (W. W. Norton & Company)
- International: Zahav: A World of Israeli Cooking by Michael Solomonov and Steven Cook (Rux Martin Books/Houghton Mifflin Harcourt)
- Photography: Near & Far: Recipes Inspired by Home and Travel Photographer: Heidi Swanson (Ten Speed Press)
- Reference and Scholarship: The Jemima Code: Two Centuries of African American Cookbooks by Toni Tipton-Martin (University of Texas Press)
- Single Subject: A Bird in the Hand: Chicken Recipes for Every Day and Every Mood by Diana Henry (Mitchell Beazley)
- Writing and Literature: Soda Politics: Taking on Big Soda (and Winning) by Marion Nestle (Oxford University Press)
- Vegetable Focused and Vegetarian: V Is for Vegetables: Inspired Recipes & Techniques for Home Cooks by Michael Anthony (Little, Brown and Company)
- Book of the Year: Zahav: A World of Israeli Cooking by Michael Solomonov and Steven Cook (Rux Martin Books/Houghton Mifflin Harcourt)
- Cookbook Hall of Fame: Deborah Madison, Vegetarian Cooking for Everyone

=== Broadcast Media Awards ===
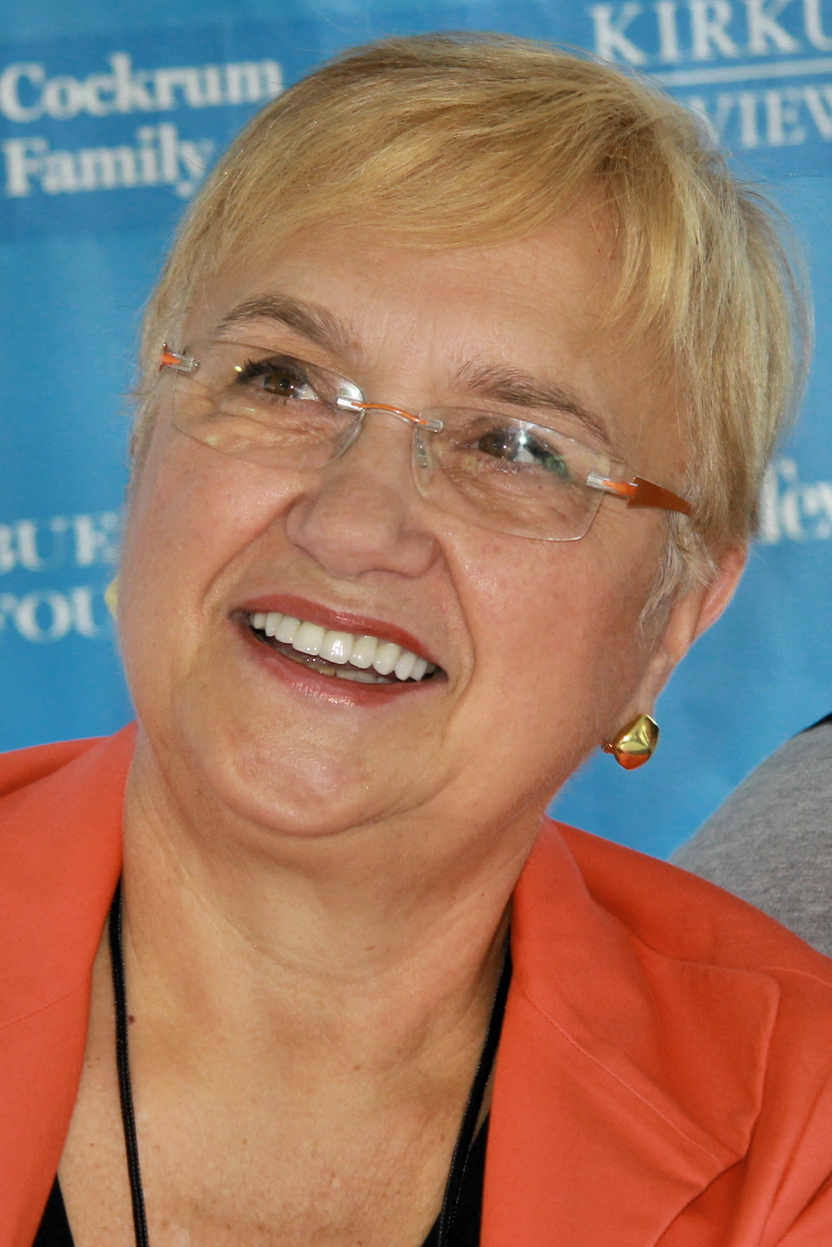
Lidia Bastianich

Sources:

- Documentary: The Starfish Throwers Jesse Roesler, (DirecTV)
- Outstanding Personality/Host: Vivian Howard, A Chef's Life (PBS)
- Podcast: Gravy, Tina Antolini (Southern Foodways Alliance)
- Radio Show/Audio Webcast: The Food Chain: Chinatown, Dan Saladino (NPR)
- Special: Lidia Celebrates America: Home for the Holidays, Lidia Bastianich (PBS)
- Television Program, in Studio or Fixed Location: Extra Virgin, Debi Mazar and Gabriele Corcos (Cooking Channel)
- Television Program, on Location: I'll Have What Phil's Having, Philip Rosenthal (PBS)
- Television Segment: PBS NewsHour's "Food4Thought", Allison Aubrey (PBS)
- Video Webcast, Fixed Location and/or Instructional: Indian Curries: The Basics & Beyond, Raghavan Iyer (craftsy.com)
- Video Webcast, on Location: The Sushi Chef: Oona Tempest and Toshio Oguma, Elana Schulman (Vice Media)
- Visual and Technical Excellence: Chef's Table (Netflix)

=== Journalism Awards ===
Sources:

- Dining and Travel: Tom Sietsema, "America's Best Food Cities" The Washington Post
- Food and Culture: John Birdsall, "Straight-Up Passing", Jarry
- Food and Health: Sidney Fry and Robin Bashinsky, "The Healthy Cook's Guide to Fat", Cooking Light
- Food Blog: Lucky Peach
- Food Coverage in a General-Interest Publication: Lesley Bargar Suter and Bill Esparza, Los Angeles Magazine
- Food-Related Columns: Francis Lam, "Eat", New York Times Magazine
- Food Reporting: Martha Mendoza, Margie Mason, and Robin McDowell, "Seafood From Slaves - An AP Investigation Helps Free Slaves in the 21st Century", Associated Press
- Home Cooking: Adam Rapoport, "Cook Like a Pro!", Bon Appétit
- Humor: Maryse Chevriere, @Freshcutgardenhose, Instagram
- Personal Essay: Helen Rosner, "On Chicken Tenders", Guernica
- Profile: Wendell Brock, "Christiane Lauterbach: The Woman Who Ate Atlanta", The Bitter Southerner
- Visual Storytelling: Erin DeJesus, Danielle Centoni, Jen Stevenson, Dina Avila, McGraw Wolfman, "One Night: Kachka", Eater
- Wine, Spirits, and Other Beverages: Dave Infante, "There Are Almost No Black People Brewing Craft Beer. Here's Why.", Thrillist
- Craig Claiborne Distinguished Restaurant Review Award: Tejal Rao, "A Health Food Restaurant so Cool It Will Have You Happily Eating Seeds," "Revisiting Momofuku Ko, After the Revolution," "Polo Bar Review: Ralph Lauren Corrals the Fashionable Herd", Bloomberg Pursuits
- MFK Fisher Distinguished Writing Award: Todd Kliman, "Pork Life", Lucky Peach
- Publication of the Year: Lucky Peach

== 2017 awards ==
The 2017 James Beard Awards were presented on May 1, 2017, at the Civic Opera House, hosted by Jesse Tyler Ferguson. The Book, Broadcast and Journalism Award winners were announced in New York on April 25, hosted by Andrew Zimmern.

=== Restaurant and Chef Awards ===
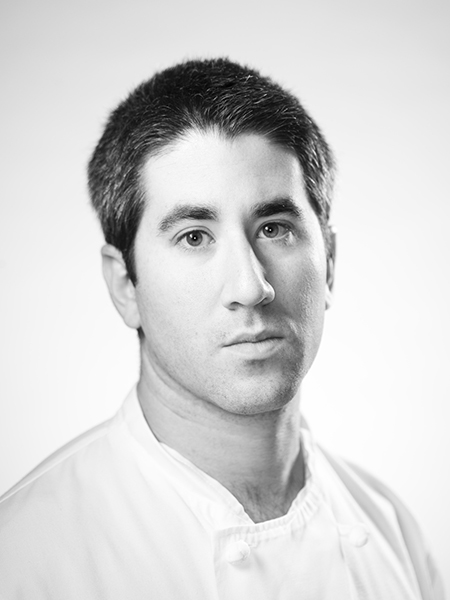
Michael Solomonov

Sources:

- Outstanding Chef: Michael Solomonov, Zahav, Philadelphia
- Lifetime Achievement Award: Nora Pouillon, Restaurant Nora, Washington, D.C.
- Humanitarian of the Year: Denise Cerreta, One World Everybody Eats, Salt Lake City
- Outstanding Restaurant: Topolobampo, Chicago
- Outstanding Bar Program: Arnaud's French 75 Bar, New Orleans
- Rising Star Chef of the Year: Zachary Engel, Shaya, New Orleans
- Best New Restaurant: Le Coucou, New York City
- Outstanding Baker: Mark Furstenberg, Bread Furst, Washington, D.C.
- Outstanding Pastry Chef: Ghaya Oliveira, Daniel, NYC
- Outstanding Restaurateur: Stephen Starr, Starr Restaurants (Le Coucou, Serpico, Upland, and others), Philadelphia
- Outstanding Service: Blue Hill at Stone Barns, Pocantico Hills, NY
- Outstanding Wine Beer or Spirits: Sam Calagione, Dogfish Head Craft Brewery, Milton, DE
- Outstanding Wine Program: Canlis, Seattle
- Best Chef: Mid-Atlantic: Greg Vernick, Vernick Food & Drink, Philadelphia
- Best Chef: Midwest: Kevin Nashan, Sidney Street Cafe, St. Louis
- Best Chef: Great Lakes: Sarah Grueneberg, Monteverde, Chicago
- Best Chef: New York: Marco Canora, Hearth
- Best Chef: Northeast: Andrew Taylor and Mike Wiley, Eventide Oyster Co., Portland, ME
- Best Chef: Northwest: Gabrielle Quiñónez Denton and Greg Denton, Ox, Portland, OR
- Best Chef: South: Rebecca Wilcomb, Herbsaint, New Orleans
- Best Chef: Southeast: Steven Satterfield, Miller Union, Atlanta
- Best Chef: Southwest: Hugo Ortega, Hugo's, Houston
- Best Chef: West: Corey Lee, Benu, San Francisco

=== Restaurant Design Awards ===
Sources:

- 75 Seats and Under: AvroKO, SingleThread, Healdsburg, California
- 76 Seats and Over: Meyer Davis, St. Cecilia, Atlanta
- Design Icon: Grand Central Oyster Bar and Restaurant, NYC

=== Book Awards ===
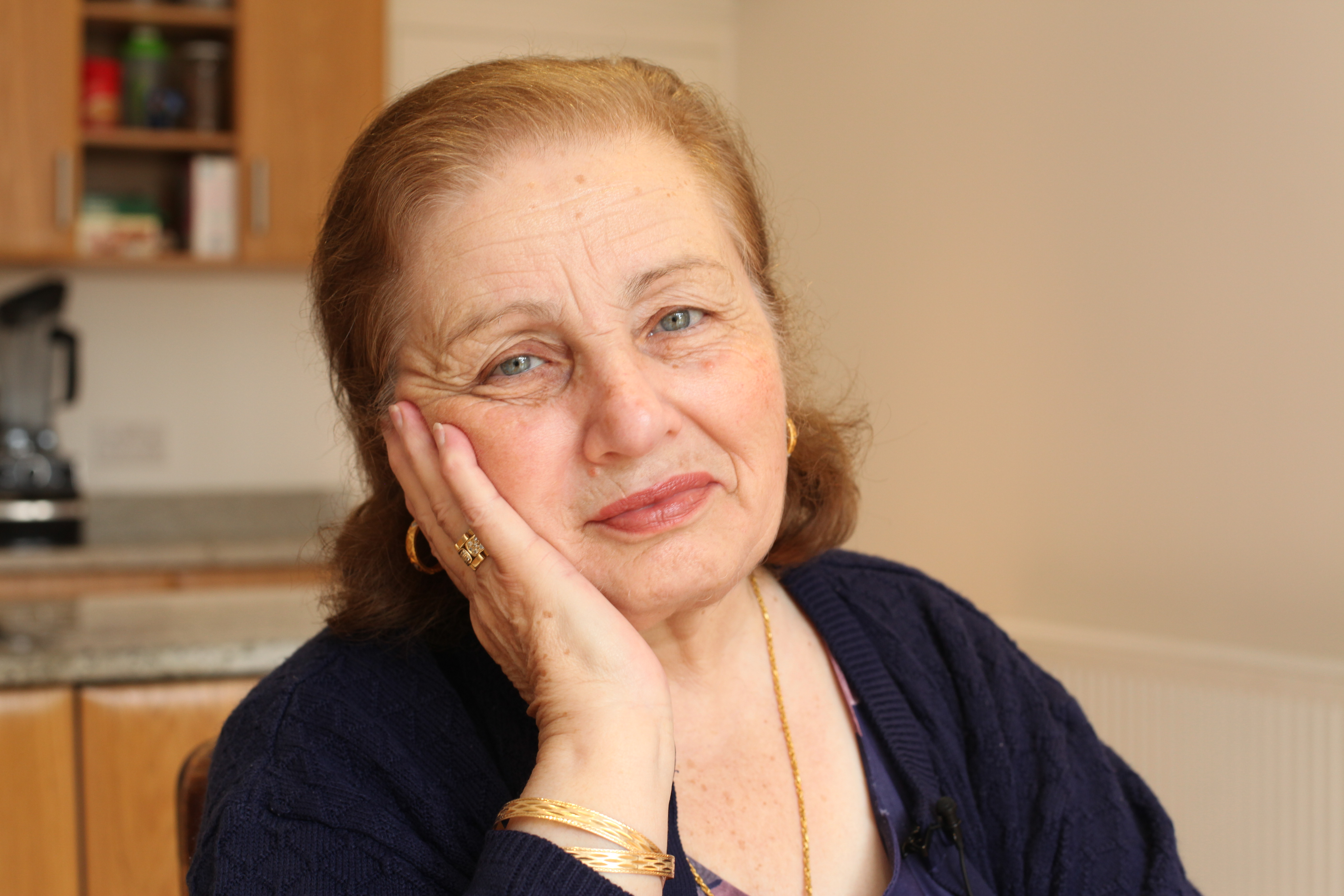
Salma Hage

Sources:

- American Cooking Victuals: An Appalachian Journey, with Recipes by Ronni Lundy (Clarkson Potter)
- Baking and Dessert Dorie's Cookies by Dorie Greenspan (Rux Martin Books/Houghton Mifflin Harcourt)
- Beverage Smuggler's Cove: Exotic Cocktails, Rum, and the Cult of Tiki by Martin Cate with Rebecca Cate (Ten Speed Press)
- Cooking from a Professional Point of View Classic Koffmann by Pierre Koffmann (Jacqui Small)
- General Cooking Eat in My Kitchen: To Cook, to Bake, to Eat, and to Treat by Meike Peters (Prestel)
- Health You Have It Made: Delicious, Healthy, Do-Ahead Meals by Ellie Krieger (Houghton Mifflin Harcourt)
- International Taste of Persia: A Cook's Travels Through Armenia, Azerbaijan, Georgia, Iran, and Kurdistan by Naomi Duguid (Artisan)
- Nonfiction A Square Meal: A Culinary History of the Great Depression by Jane Ziegelman and Andrew Coe (Harper)
- Photography Taste & Technique: Recipes to Elevate Your Home Cooking by Chris Court (Ten Speed Press)
- Reference and Scholarship The Oxford Companion to Cheese by Catherine Donnelly (Oxford University Press)
- Single Subject Milk. Made: A Book About Cheese. How to Choose It, Serve It and Eat It by Nick Haddow (Hardie Grant)
- Vegetable Cooking The Middle Eastern Vegetarian Cookbook by Salma Hage (Phaidon Press)
- Book of the Year Victuals: An Appalachian Journey, with Recipes by Ronni Lundy (Clarkson Potter)
- Cookbook Hall of Fame Judith Jones

=== Broadcast Media Awards ===
Sources:

- Documentary: The Birth of Saké, Director: Erik Shirai, Producer: Masako Tsumura
- Outstanding Personality/Host: Andrew Zimmern, Andrew Zimmern's Bucket List; Andrew Zimmern's Driven by Food; Bizarre Foods with Andrew Zimmern, Travel Channel
- Podcast: The Four Top, Katherine Cole and Morgan Holm. NPR
- Radio Show/Audio Webcast: Hidden Kitchens: War & Peace & Food, Davia Nelson and Nikki Silva, NPR
- Special (on TV or Web): Lidia Celebrates America: Holiday for Heroes, Lidia Bastianich PBS
- Television Program, in Studio or Fixed Location: Fish the Dish, Spencer Watts, Gusto
- Television Program, on Location: Chef's Table, Netflix
- Television Segment: Harvesting Alaska, Heather Hintze and Lauren Maxwell, KTVA
- Video Webcast, Fixed Location and/or Instructional:Kitchen Conundrums with Thomas Joseph, Samantha Schutz and Greta Anthony, marthastewart.com
- Video Webcast, on Location: Working 24 Hours at..., Andrew Knowlton, Bon Appétit
- Visual and Technical Excellence: Uncharted, James Mann, tastemade.com

=== Journalism Awards ===
Sources:

- Dining and Travel: "I Want Crab. Pure Maryland Crab." Bill Addison, Eater
- Food and Culture: "A Last Dinner in the Jungle," Shane Mitchell, Roads & Kingdoms
- Food and Health: "Brain Food", Hunter Lewis, Carolyn Williams, Sidney Fry, and Peggy Knickerbocker, Cooking Light
- Food Coverage in a General-Interest Publication: The New Yorker Food Issue, David Remnick, Lauren Collins, Dana Goodyear, and Carolyn Kormann
- Columns: "Eat": "A Haitian Grandmother's Home-Cooked Porridge"; "Kimchi Fried Rice, Korean Comfort Food"; and "Casa Calamari", Francis Lam, The New York Times Magazine
- Food Reporting: "Exploited in Paradise" series, Martha Mendoza and Margie Mason, Associated Press
- Home Cooking: "How to Cook, Smoke, Crumble, Grind, Pickle, Candy, Milk, Slow Cook, Toast, Pulverize, and Fry a Nut", Hunter Lewis, Cheryl Slocum, and Robin Bashinsky, Cooking Light
- Humor: "Recipes with Roots: The True Meaning of Turkey", Francis Lam, Cooking Light
- Local Impact: "'Free Crabs!'"; "A Significant Goodbye"; "Feeding the Prison System", Hanna Raskin, The Post and Courier
- Personal Essay: "All I Want Are Some Potato Skins", Keith Pandolfi, Serious Eats
- Profile: "Finding Pete Wells: A Search for America's Most Dangerous Restaurant Critic", Kevin Alexander, Thrillist
- Visual Storytelling: "Thrill Ride", Vince Dixon and Mariya Pylayev, Eater
- Wine, Spirits, and other Beverages: "The Great Craft Beer Sellout", Dave Infante, Thrillist
- Craig Claiborne Distinguished Restaurant Review Award: Karen Brooks, Portland Monthly
- MFK Fisher Distinguished Writing Award: "The Dog Thief Killings", Calvin Godfrey, Roads & Kingdoms
- Publication of the Year: Roads and Kingdoms

== 2018 awards ==
The 2018 James Beard Awards were presented on May 7, 2018, at the Civic Opera House, hosted by Carla Hall. The Media Awards were presented on April 27 at Chelsea Piers in New York City and hosted by Tamron Hall.

=== Restaurant and Chef Awards ===
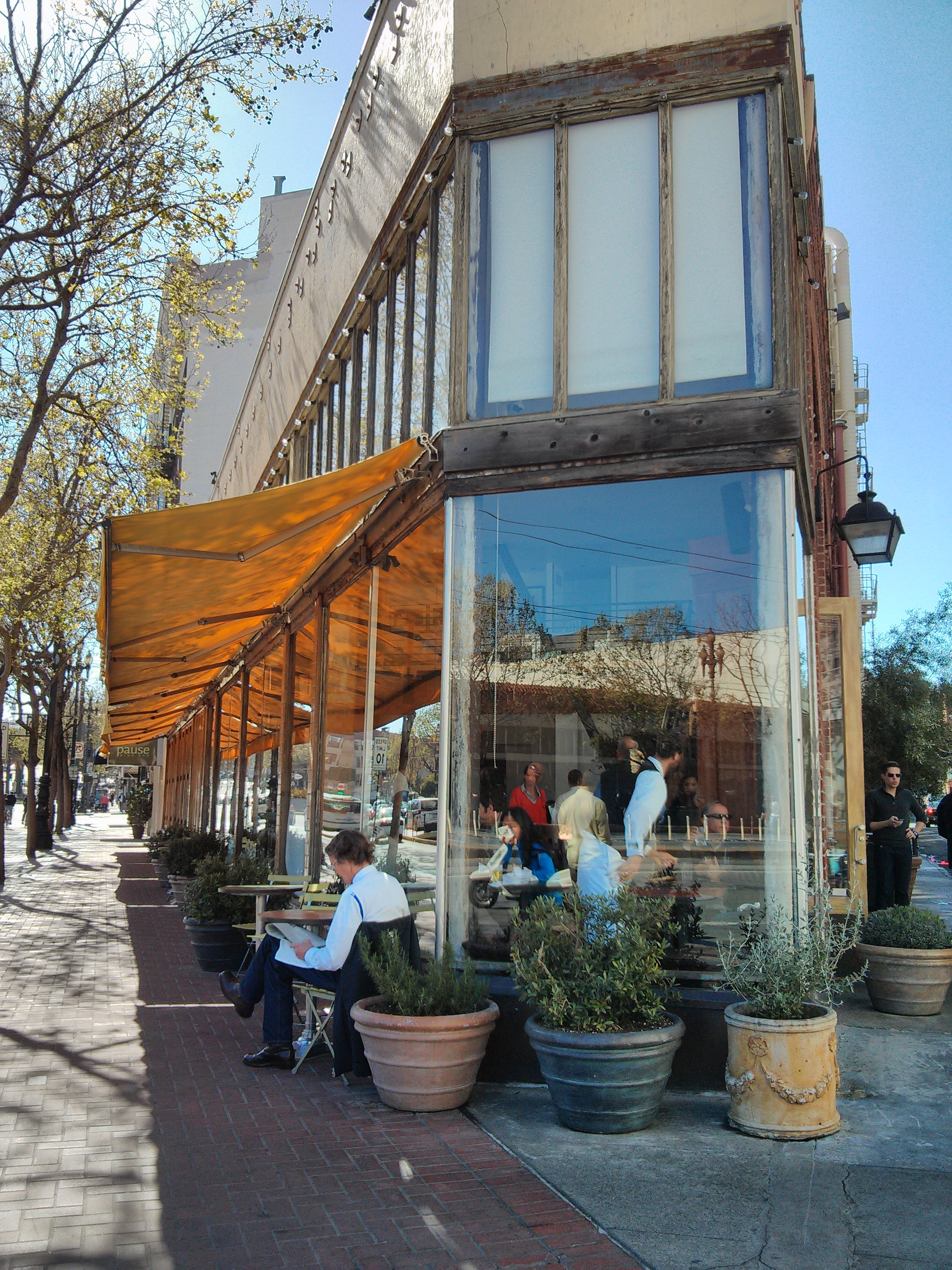
Zuni Café, San Francisco

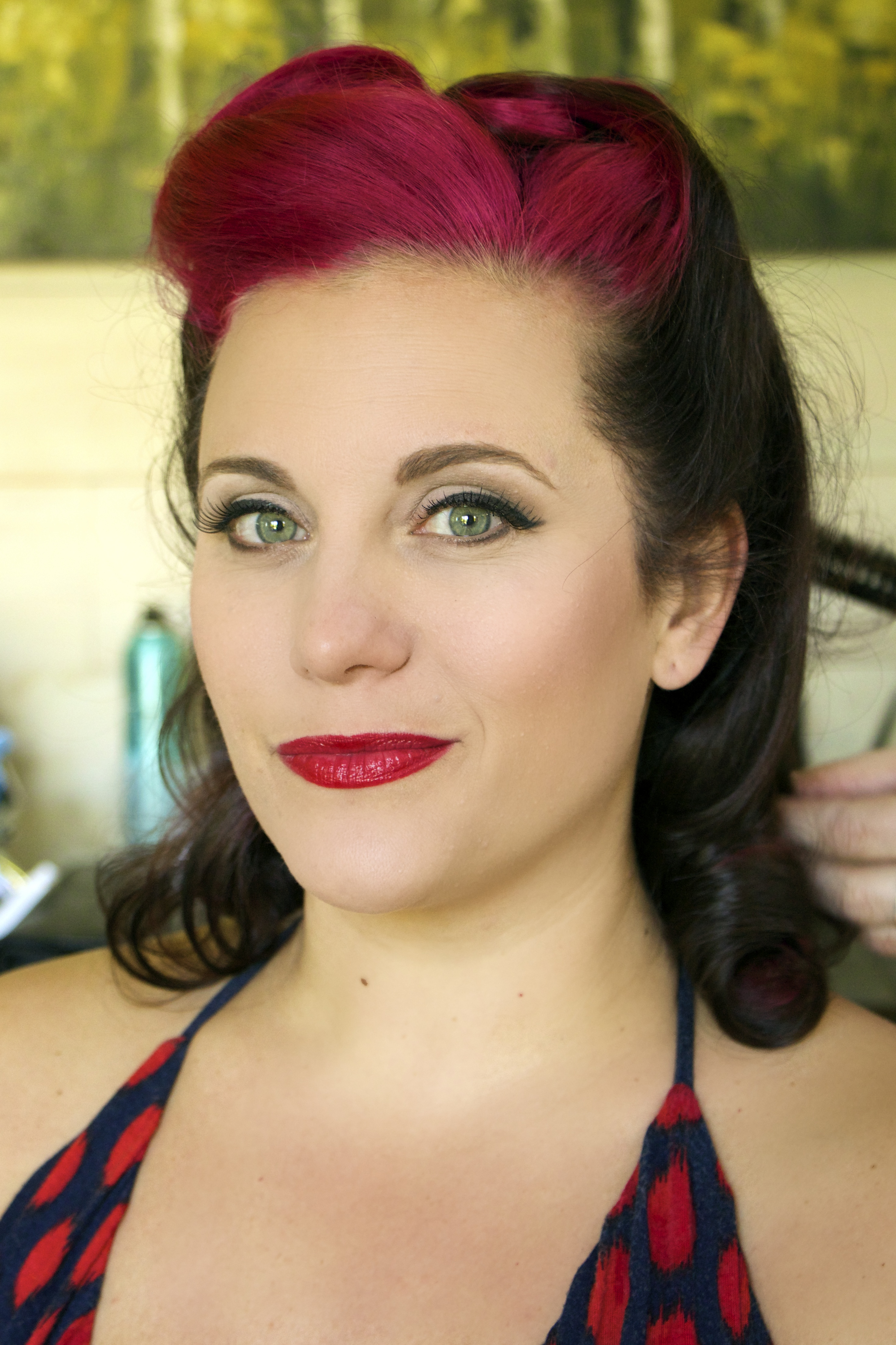
Karen Akunowicz

Sources:

- Outstanding Chef: Gabrielle Hamilton, Prune, New York
- Lifetime Achievement Award: Paula Wolfert
- Humanitarian of the Year: José Andrés, World Central Kitchen, Washington, D.C.
- Outstanding Restaurant: Highlands Bar & Grill, Birmingham, Alabama
- Outstanding Bar Program: Cure, New Orleans
- Rising Star Chef of the Year: Camille Cogswell, Zahav, Philadelphia
- Best New Restaurant: JuneBaby, Seattle
- Outstanding Baker: Belinda Leong and Michel Suas, B. Patisserie, San Francisco
- Outstanding Pastry Chef: Dolester Miles, Highlands Bar & Grill, Birmingham, Alabama
- Outstanding Restaurateur: Caroline Styne, The Lucques Group, Los Angeles
- Outstanding Service: Zuni Café, San Francisco
- Outstanding Wine Beer or Spirits: Mike Grgich, Grgich Hills Estate, Rutherford, CA
- Outstanding Wine Program: FIG, Charleston, SC
- Best Chef: Mid-Atlantic: Jeremiah Langhorne, The Dabney, Washington, D.C.
- Best Chef: Midwest: Gavin Kaysen, Spoon and Stable, Minneapolis
- Best Chef: Great Lakes: Abraham Conlon, Fat Rice, Chicago
- Best Chef: New York: Missy Robbins, Lilia
- Best Chef: Northeast: Karen Akunowicz, Myers + Chang, Boston
- Best Chef: Northwest: Edouardo Jordan, Salare, Seattle
- Best Chef: South: Nina Compton, Compère Lapin, New Orleans
- Best Chef: Southeast: Rodney Scott, Rodney Scott's Whole Hog BBQ, Charleston, SC
- Best Chef: Southwest: Alex Seidel, Mercantile Dining & Provision, Denver
- Best Chef: West: Dominique Crenn, Atelier Crenn, San Francisco

=== Restaurant Design Awards ===
Sources:

- 75 Seats and Under: The MP Shift, De Maria, New York City
- 76 Seats and Over: Aidlin Darling Design with a l m project, In Situ, San Francisco, California
- Design Icon: The American Restaurant, Kansas City, Missouri

=== Book Awards ===
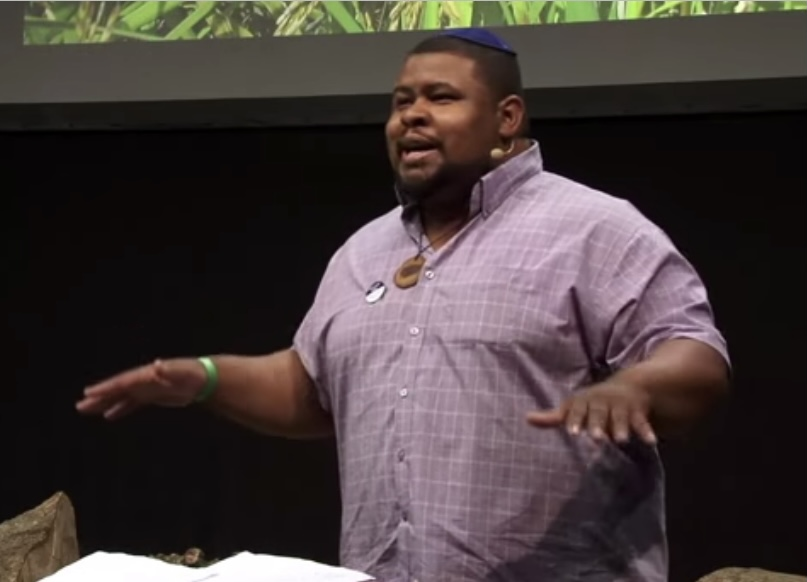
Michael Twitty

Sources:

- American Cooking The Sioux Chef's Indigenous Kitchen by Sean Sherman with Beth Dooley (University of Minnesota Press)
- Baking and Dessert BraveTart: Iconic American Desserts by Stella Parks (W. W. Norton & Company)
- Beverage Meehan's Bartender Manual by Jim Meehan (Ten Speed Press)
- General Cooking Salt, Fat, Acid, Heat by Samin Nosrat (Simon and Schuster)
- Health and Special Diets Deepa's Secrets by Deepa Thomas (Skyhorse)
- International Nopalito by Gonzalo Guzman and Stacy Adimando (Ten Speed Press)
- Photography Cook Beautiful by Johnny Miller (Abrams)
- Reference, History, and Scholarship Champagne by Peter Liem (Ten Speed Press)
- Restaurant and Professional Modernist Bread by Nathan Myhrvold and Francisco Migoya (The Cooking Lab)
- Single Subject The Pho Cookbook by Andrea Nguyen (Ten Speed Press)
- Vegetable-Focused Cooking Six Seasons: A New Way with Vegetables by Joshua McFadden with Martha Holmberg (Artisan Books)
- Writing The Cooking Gene by Michael W. Twitty (Amistad)
- Book of the Year The Cooking Gene by Michael W. Twitty (Amistad)
- Cookbook Hall of Fame Betty Fussell

=== Broadcast Media Awards ===
Pati Jinich

Sources:

- Documentary: Barbecue, Director: Matthew Salleh, Producers: Daniel Joyce and Rose Tucker, Netflix
- Outstanding Personality/Host: Pati Jinich, Pati's Mexican Table, WETA
- Podcast: The Sporkful, Dan Pashman, Anne Noyes Saini, and Dan Charles
- Radio Show/Audio Webcast: The Legacy of the Mississippi Delta Chinese, Melissa Block, Elissa Nadworny, NPR
- Special (on TV or Web): Lidia Celebrates America: Homegrown Heroes, Lidia Bastianich, PBS
- Television Program, in Studio or Fixed Location: Barefoot Contessa: Cook Like a Pro, Ina Garten, Food Network
- Television Program, on Location: Chef's Table: Jeong Kwan, Netflix
- Television Segment: PBS NewsHour, Allison Aubrey and Paul Solman, Mary Beth Durkin
- Video Webcast, Fixed Location and/or Instructional: Panna Cooking: Black Bean-Glazed Salmon with Ginger Cabbage, Vivian Howard
- Video Webcast, on Location: Working 24 Hours at..., Andrew Knowlton, Bon Appétit
- Visual and Technical Excellence: Food Talkies, Andrew Gooi

=== Journalism Awards ===
Sources:

- Columns: Missed Cues: "Get Help"; "Distilled Identity"; and "Destination, Small Town," Osayi Endolyn, Gravy
- Dining and Travel: "In Pursuit of Perfect Hummus," J.M. Hirsch, Christopher Kimball's Milk Street Magazine
- Feature Reporting : "The NBA's Secret Addiction," Baxter Holmes, ESPN The Magazine
- Food and Health: "The Great Nutrient Collapse," Helena Bottemiller Evich, Politico
- Food Section: Roads & Kingdoms, Nathan Thornburgh, Matt Goulding, Cara Parks
- Foodways: "The Teenage Whaler's Tale," Julia O'Malley, High Country News
- Home Cooking: "Thanksgiving Lessons," Adam Rapoport, Bon Appétit
- Humor: "Pumpkin Spice Life," Maura Judkis, The Washington Post
- Innovative Storytelling: "The New Essentials of French Cooking," Melissa Clark, Emily Weinstein, Barbara deWilde, and Alexandra Eaton, The New York Times
- Investigative Reporting: "'The Only Good Muslim' " and "Compromised," Ted Genoways, The New Republic
- Local Impact: "Farm to Chapel"; "They Ditched Vienna Sausages for Porterhouse Steaks and Lobster at West Grove Cookout"; and "How a Secular Jewish Baker Became Miami's Kosher King," Carlos Frías, Miami Herald
- Personal Essay: "Dear Women: Own Your Stories," Lisa Donovan, Foodandwine.com
- Profile: "She Was a Soul Food Sensation. Then, 19 Years Ago, She Disappeared," Mayukh Sen, Food52
- Wine, Spirits, and Other Beverages: "The Pu-Erh Broker," Max Falkowitz, Saveur
- Craig Claiborne Distinguished Restaurant Review Award: Counter Intelligence: "The World's Best Restaurant Opens a Pop-Up in Mexico"; "At Vespertine, Jonathan Gold Makes Contact with Otherworldly Cooking"; "Jonathan Gold Finds Delight in the Secretive Santa Monica Restaurant Dialogue," Jonathan Gold, Los Angeles Times
- M.F.K. Fisher Distinguished Writing Award: "Who Owns Uncle Ben?", Shane Mitchell, The Bitter Southerner
- Publication of the Year: The Salt

== 2019 awards ==
The 2019 James Beard Awards were presented on May 6, 2019, at the Civic Opera House in Chicago, hosted by Jesse Tyler Ferguson. The Media Awards were presented on April 26 at Chelsea Piers in New York City, hosted by Tyra Banks.

=== Restaurant and Chef Awards ===
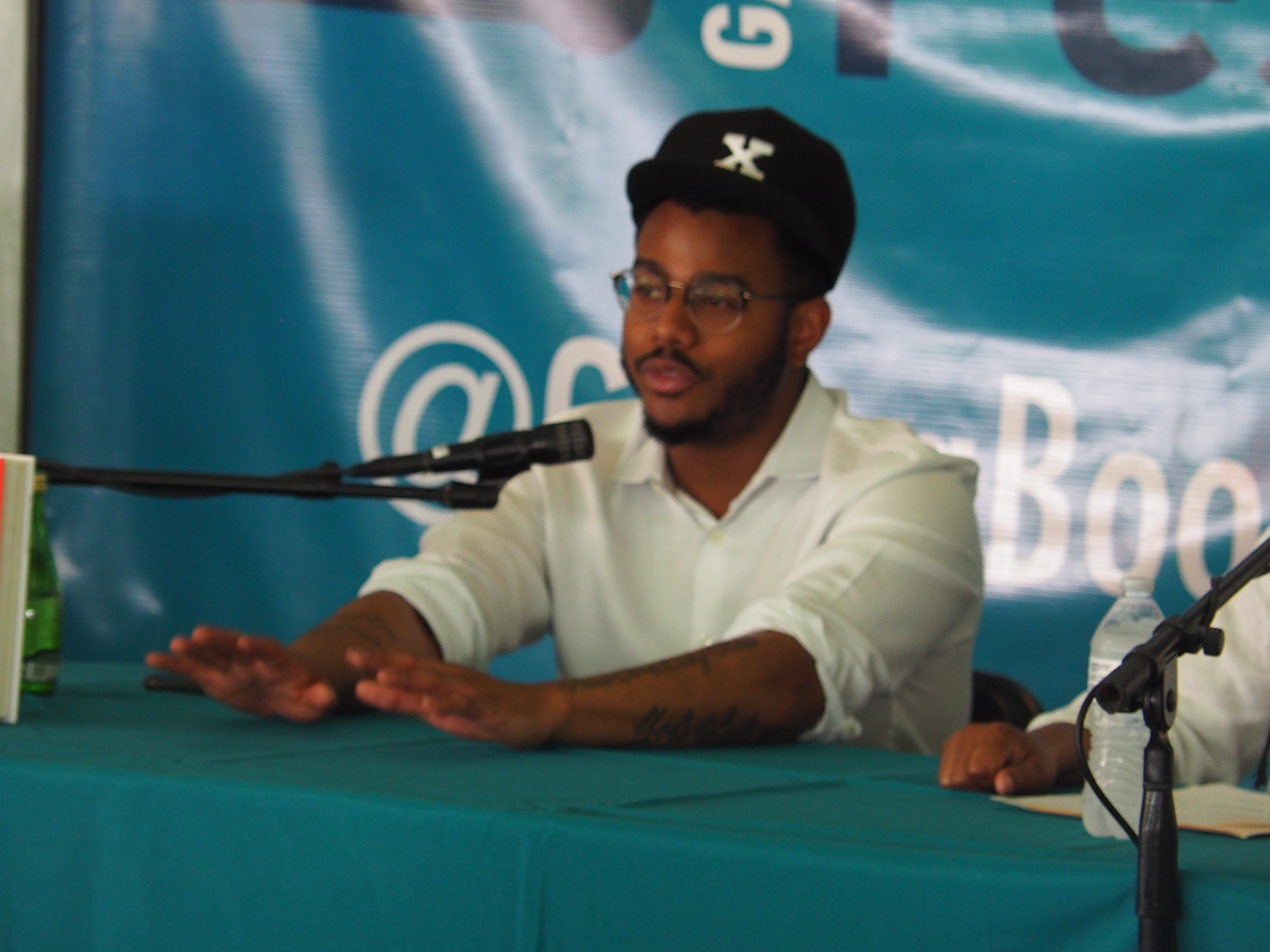
Kwame Onwuachi

Sources:

- Lifetime Achievement Award: Patrick O'Connell, The Inn at Little Washington in Washington, VA
- Humanitarian of the Year: Giving Kitchen in Atlanta, GA
- Outstanding Chef: Ashley Christensen, Poole's Diner, Raleigh, NC
- Outstanding Restaurant: Zahav, Philadelphia
- Outstanding Bar Program: Bar Agricole, San Francisco
- Rising Star Chef of the Year: Kwame Onwuachi, Kith and Kin, Washington, D.C.
- Best New Restaurant: Frenchette, NYC
- Outstanding Baker: Greg Wade, Publican Quality Bread, Chicago
- Outstanding Pastry Chef: Kelly Fields, Willa Jean, New Orleans
- Outstanding Restaurateur: Kevin Boehm and Rob Katz, Boka Restaurant Group (Boka, Girl & the Goat, Momotaro, and others), Chicago
- Outstanding Service: Frasca Food and Wine, Boulder, CO
- Outstanding Wine Beer or Spirits: Rob Tod, Allagash Brewing Company, Portland, ME
- Outstanding Wine Program: Benu, San Francisco
- Best Chef: Mid-Atlantic: Tom Cunanan, Bad Saint, Washington, D.C.
- Best Chef: Midwest: Ann Kim, Young Joni, Minneapolis
- Best Chef: Great Lakes: Beverly Kim and Johnny Clark, Parachute, Chicago
- Best Chef: New York City: Jody Williams and Rita Sodi, Via Carota
- Best Chef: Northeast: Tony Messina, Uni, Boston
- Best Chef: Northwest: Brady Williams, Canlis, Seattle
- Best Chef: South: Vishwesh Bhatt, Snackbar, Oxford, MS
- Best Chef: Southeast: Mashama Bailey, The Grey, Savannah, GA
- Best Chef: Southwest: Charleen Badman, FnB, Scottsdale, AZ
- Best Chef: West: Michael Cimarusti, Providence, Los Angeles

=== Restaurant Design Awards ===
Sources:

- 75 Seats and Under: Studio Writers, Atomix, New York City
- 76 Seats and Over: Parts and Labor Design, Pacific Standard Time, Chicago, Illinois
- Design Icon: Canlis, Seattle, Washington

=== Book Awards ===
Sources:

- American Cooking Between Harlem and Heaven: Afro-Asian-American Cooking for Big Nights, Weeknights, and Every Day by JJ Johnson and Alexander Smalls with Veronica Chambers (Flatiron Books)
- Baking and Dessert SUQAR: Desserts & Sweets from the Modern Middle East by Greg Malouf and Lucy Malouf (Hardie Grant Books)
- Beverage Wine Folly: Magnum Edition by Madeline Puckette and Justin Hammack (Avery)
- General Cooking Milk Street: Tuesday Nights by Christopher Kimball (Little, Brown and Company)
- Health and Special Diets Eat a Little Better by Sam Kass (Clarkson Potter)
- International Feast: Food of the Islamic World by Anissa Helou (Ecco)
- Photography Tokyo New Wave by Andrea Fazzari (Ten Speed Press)
- Reference, History, and Scholarship Canned: The Rise and Fall of Consumer Confidence in the American Food Industry by Anna Zeide (University of California Press)
- Restaurant and Professional Chicken and Charcoal: Yakitori, Yardbird, Hong Kong by Matt Abergel (Phaidon Press)
- Single Subject Goat: Cooking and Eating by James Whetlor (Quadrille Publishing)
- Vegetable-Focused Cooking Saladish by Ilene Rosen (Artisan Books)
- Writing Buttermilk Graffiti: A Chef's Journey to Discover America's New Melting-Pot Cuisine by Edward Lee (chef) (Artisan Books)
- Book of the Year Cocktail Codex by Alex Day, Nick Fauchald, and David Kaplan, with Devon Tarby (Ten Speed Press)
- Cookbook Hall of Fame Jessica B. Harris

=== Broadcast Media Awards ===
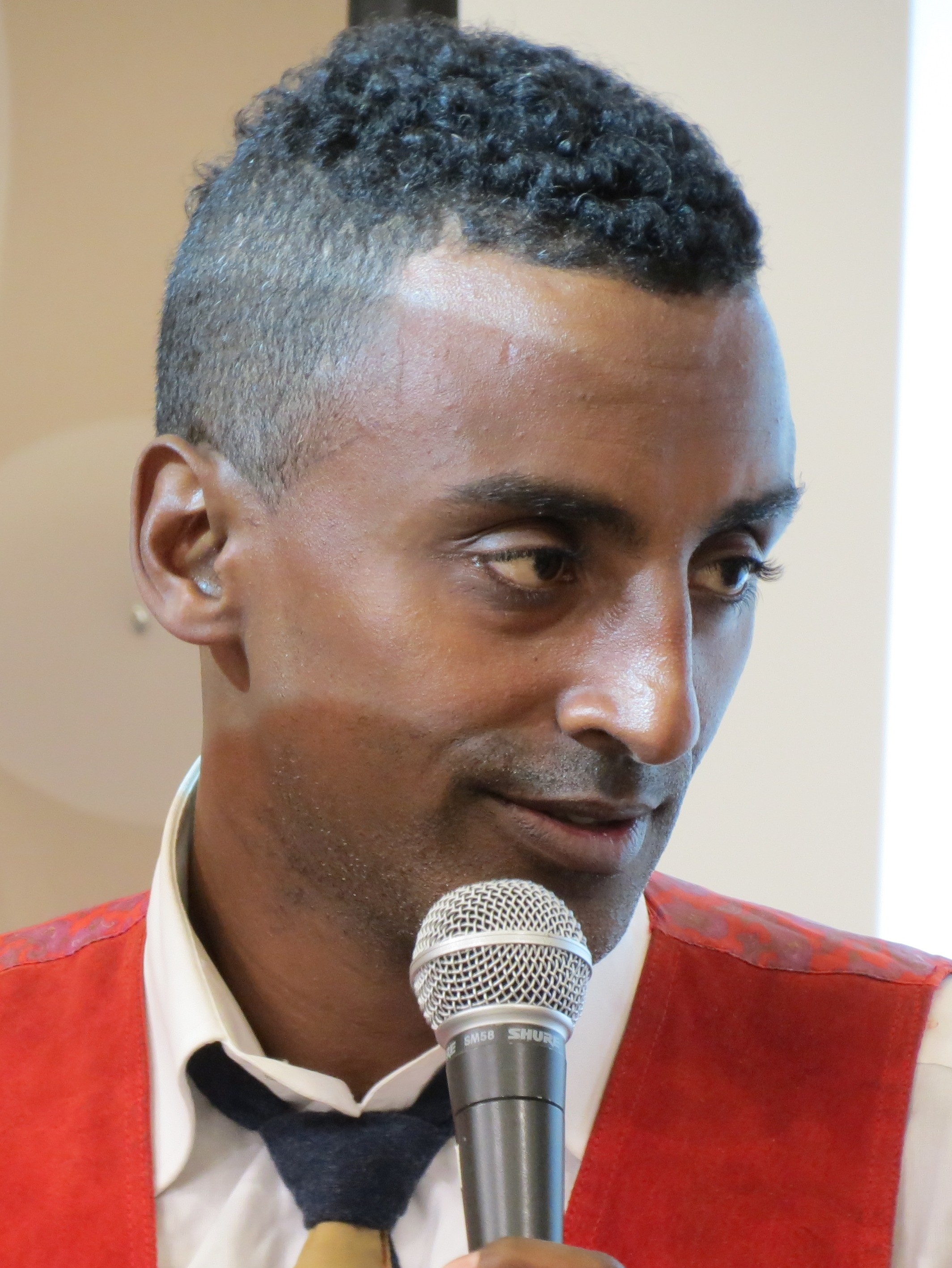
Marcus Samuelsson

Sources:

- Documentary: Modified, Vimeo
- Online Video, Fixed Location and/or Instructional: MasterClass – Dominique Ansel Teaches French Pastry Fundamentals, MasterClass
- Online Video, on Location: First We Feast's Food Skills – Mozzarella Kings of New York, YouTube
- Outstanding Personality: Marcus Samuelsson, No Passport Required, PBS
- Outstanding Reporting: Deep Dive and Food for Thought, 2018 PyeongChang Winter Olympics, David Chang, NBC
- Podcast: Copper & Heat – Be a Girl, Copper & Heat
- Radio Show: The Food Chain – Raw Grief and Widowed, BBC World Service
- Special (on TV or Online): Spencer's BIG Holiday, Gusto
- Television Program, in Studio or Fixed Location: Pati's Mexican Table – Tijuana: Stories from the Border, WETA
- Television Program, on Location: Salt Fat Acid Heat – Salt, Netflix
- Visual and Technical Excellence: Anthony Bourdain: Explore Parts Unknown, CNN

=== Journalism Awards ===
Sources:

- Columns: What We Talk About When We Talk About American Food: "The Pickled Cucumbers That Survived the 1980s AIDS Epidemic"; "A Second Look at the Tuna Sandwich's All-American History"; and "Freedom and Borscht for Ukrainian-Jewish Émigrés" by Mari Uyehara, Taste
- Craig Claiborne Distinguished Restaurant Review Award: Counter Intelligence: "The Hearth & Hound, April Bloomfield's New Los Angeles Restaurant, Is Nothing Like a Gastropub"; "There's Crocodile and Hog Stomach, but Jonathan Gold Is All About the Crusty Rice at Nature Pagoda"; and "At Middle Eastern Restaurants, It All Starts with Hummus. Jonathan Gold says Bavel's Is Magnificent" by Jonathan Gold, Los Angeles Times
- Dining and Travel: "Many Chinas, Many Tables" by Jonathan Kauffman and Team, San Francisco Chronicle
- Feature Reporting : "A Kingdom from Dust" by Mark Arax, The California Sunday Magazine
- Food Coverage in a General Interest Publication: New York Magazine by Robin Raisfeld, Rob Patronite, Maggie Bullock, and the Staff of New York Magazine
- Foodways: "A Hunger for Tomatoes" by Shane Mitchell, The Bitter Southerner
- Health and Wellness: "Clean Label's Dirty Little Secret" by Nadia Berenstein, The New Food Economy
- Home Cooking: "The Subtle Thrills of Cold Chicken Salad" by Cathy Erway, Taste
- Innovative Storytelling: "In Search of Water-Boiled Fish" by Angie Wang, Eater
- Investigative Reporting: "A Killing Season" by Boyce Upholt, The New Republic
- Jonathan Gold Local Voice Award: "Yes Indeed, Lord: Queen's Cuisine, Where Everything Comes from the Heart"; "Top 10 New Orleans Restaurants for 2019"; and "Sexual Harassment Allegations Preceded Sucré Co-Founder Tariq Hanna's Departure" by Brett Anderson, The Times-Picayune
- M.F.K. Fisher Distinguished Writing Award: "What Is Northern Food?" by Steve Hoffman, Artful Living
- Personal Essay, Long Form: "I Made the Pizza Cinnamon Rolls from Mario Batali's Sexual Misconduct Apology Letter" by Geraldine DeRuiter, Everywhereist.com
- Personal Essay, Short Form: "I'm a Chef with Terminal Cancer. This Is What I'm Doing with the Time I Have Left" by Fatima Ali, Bon Appétit
- Profile: "The Short and Brilliant Life of Ernest Matthew Mickler" by Michael Adno, The Bitter Southerner
- Wine, Spirits, and Other Beverages: "'Welch's Grape Jelly with Alcohol': How Trump's Horrific Wine Became the Ultimate Metaphor for His Presidency" by Corby Kummer, Vanity Fair
- Publication of the Year: The New York Times

== See also ==
- List of James Beard America's Classics
