= Chef's Table =

2015 Netflix documentary series

- Promotional poster
- Genre: Documentary
- Created by: David Gelb
- Directed by: Brian McGinn; Clay Jeter; David Gelb; Andrew Fried; Abigail Fuller
- Presented by: Boardwalk Pictures; Supper Club
- Composers: Logan Nelson; Duncan Thum; Steve Gernes; Silas Hite; Matt Abeysekera; Sarah Schachner; Danny Bensi; Saunder Jurriaans; Sebastian Örnemark
- Country of origin: United States
- Original language: English
- No. of seasons: 7 (+5 spin-offs)
- No. of episodes: 56

Production
- Executive producers: Andrew Fried; David Gelb; Brian McGinn; Dane Lillegard; Matt Weaver; Lisa Nishimura
- Producers: Danny O'Malley; Drew Palombi; Claire Dagress; John Henion; Michael Hilliard
- Cinematography: Adam Bricker; Will Basanta; Matthew Chavez; Chloe Weaver
- Editors: Brad Grossman; Jason Moll; Matt Mascia; Robinson Eng; Jay Garcia; Brianne Hunt; Brian Triebwasser; Hannah Tripp; Dante Pasquinelli
- Production companies: Netflix; Boardwalk Pictures; Supper Club; FINCH; Itaca Films

Original release
- Network: Netflix
- Release: April 26, 2015 – present

Chef's Table is an American documentary series created by David Gelb, which premiered on video streaming service Netflix on April 26, 2015. The series shows the lives and kitchens of acclaimed and successful international chefs, with each episode focusing on a single chef. The series has been nominated for and awarded awards, including eight Emmy nominations. Season 7 was released on November 27, 2024 and a fifth spin-off entitled "Legends" was released on April 28, 2025, coinciding with the 10th anniversary of the show. On September 23, 2026, the show was renewed for two more seasons.

== Overview ==
Each episode of the series focuses on a specific chef, and explores their personal philosophies and approach to cooking. Creator David Gelb considers it a follow-up to his documentary Jiro Dreams of Sushi. He teamed up with Brian McGinn to develop Chef's Table with Boardwalk Pictures and Netflix became interested in it. Both documentaries make use of cinematography and production techniques based on traditional filmmaking rather than reality television.

== Series overview ==
Volume	Episodes	Originally released
1	6	April 26, 2015
2	6	May 27, 2016
France	4	September 2, 2016
3	6	February 17, 2017
4: Pastry	4	April 13, 2018
5	4	September 28, 2018
6	4	February 22, 2019
BBQ	4	September 2, 2020
Pizza	6	September 7, 2022
Noodles	4	October 2, 2024
7	4	November 27, 2024
Legends	4	April 28, 2025

== Episodes ==
=== Volume 1 (2015) ===
No. overall	No. in season	Chef	Restaurant	Directed by	Original release date
1	1	Massimo Bottura	Osteria Francescana in Modena, Italy	David Gelb	April 26, 2015
2	2	Dan Barber	Blue Hill Restaurant in New York City and Stone Barns (Pocantico Hills, New York), United States	Clay Jeter	April 26, 2015
3	3	Francis Mallmann	Patagonia Sur in Buenos Aires, Argentina	Clay Jeter	April 26, 2015
4	4	Niki Nakayama	n/naka in Los Angeles, United States	Andrew Fried	April 26, 2015
5	5	Ben Shewry	Attica in Melbourne, Australia	Brian McGinn	April 26, 2015
6	6	Magnus Nilsson	Fäviken in Järpen, Sweden	Brian McGinn	April 26, 2015

=== Volume 2 (2016) ===
No. overall	No. in season	Chef	Restaurant	Directed by	Original release date
7	1	Grant Achatz	Alinea in Chicago, United States	Brian McGinn	May 27, 2016
8	2	Alex Atala	D.O.M. in São Paulo, Brazil	Clay Jeter	May 27, 2016
9	3	Dominique Crenn	Atelier Crenn in San Francisco, United States	Andrew Fried	May 27, 2016
10	4	Enrique Olvera	Pujol in Mexico City, Mexico	Clay Jeter	May 27, 2016
11	5	Ana Roš	Hiša Franko in Kobarid, Slovenia	Abigail Fuller	May 27, 2016
12	6	Gaggan Anand	Gaggan in Bangkok, Thailand	David Gelb	May 27, 2016

=== Chef's Table: France (2016) ===
The first spin-off, titled Chef's Table: France premiered on September 1, 2016.

No. overall	No. in season	Chef	Restaurant	Directed by	Original release date
13	1	Alain Passard	L'Arpège in Paris, France	David Gelb	September 2, 2016
14	2	Alexandre Couillon	La Marine in Noirmoutier-en-l'Île, France	Clay Jeter	September 2, 2016
15	3	Adeline Grattard	Yam’Tcha in Paris, France	Andrew Fried	September 2, 2016
16	4	Michel Troisgros	La Maison Troisgros in Roanne, France	David Gelb	September 2, 2016

=== Volume 3 (2017) ===
No. overall	No. in season	Chef	Restaurant	Directed by	Original release date
17	1	Jeong Kwan	Chunjinam Hermitage at Baekyangsa in Jangseong County, South Korea	David Gelb	February 17, 2017
18	2	Vladimir Mukhin	White Rabbit in Moscow, Russia	Brian McGinn	February 17, 2017
19	3	Nancy Silverton	Osteria Mozza in Los Angeles, United States	Andrew Fried	February 17, 2017
20	4	Ivan Orkin	Ivan Ramen in New York City, United States	David Gelb	February 17, 2017
21	5	Tim Raue	Restaurant Tim Raue in Berlin, Germany	Abigail Fuller	February 17, 2017
22	6	Virgilio Martínez	Central in Lima, Peru	Clay Jeter	February 17, 2017

=== Volume 4: Pastry (2018) ===
No. overall	No. in season	Chef	Restaurant	Directed by	Original release date
23	1	Christina Tosi	Milk Bar in New York City, United States	Andrew Fried	April 13, 2018
24	2	Corrado Assenza	Caffè Sicilia in Noto, Italy	Brian McGinn	April 13, 2018
25	3	Jordi Roca	El Celler de Can Roca in Girona, Spain	David Gelb	April 13, 2018
26	4	Will Goldfarb	Room 4 Dessert in Ubud, Indonesia	Brian McGinn	April 13, 2018

=== Volume 5 (2018) ===
No. overall	No. in season	Chef	Restaurant	Directed by	Original release date
27	1	Cristina Martinez	South Philly Barbacoa in Philadelphia, United States	Abigail Fuller	September 28, 2018
28	2	Musa Dağdeviren	Çiya in Istanbul, Turkey	Clay Jeter	September 28, 2018
29	3	Bo Songvisava	Bo.lan in Bangkok, Thailand	Andrew Fried	September 28, 2018
30	4	Albert Adrià	Tickets in Barcelona, Spain	Jim Goldblum	September 28, 2018

=== Volume 6 (2019) ===
No. overall	No. in season	Chef	Restaurant	Directed by	Original release date
31	1	Mashama Bailey	The Grey in Savannah, Georgia, United States	Abigail Fuller	February 22, 2019
32	2	Dario Cecchini	Solociccia in Panzano, Tuscany, Italy	Jim Goldblum	February 22, 2019
33	3	Asma Khan	Darjeeling Express in London, United Kingdom	Zia Mandviwalla	February 22, 2019
34	4	Sean Brock	Husk in Charleston, South Carolina, United States	Clay Jeter	February 22, 2019

=== Chef's Table: BBQ (2020) ===
A second spin-off, titled Chef's Table: BBQ premiered on September 2, 2020.

No. overall	No. in season	Chef	Restaurant	Directed by	Original release date
35	1	Tootsie Tomanetz	Snow's BBQ in Lexington, Texas, United States	Zia Mandviwalla	September 2, 2020
36	2	Lennox Hastie	Firedoor in Sydney, Australia	Brian McGinn	September 2, 2020
37	3	Rodney Scott	Rodney Scott's Whole Hog BBQ in Charleston, South Carolina, United States	Clay Jeter	September 2, 2020
38	4	Rosalia Chay Chuc	Cochinita Pibil in Yaxuná, Mexico	Zia Mandviwalla	September 2, 2020

=== Chef's Table: Pizza (2022) ===
A third spin-off, titled Chef's Table: Pizza premiered on September 7, 2022.

No. overall	No. in season	Chef	Restaurant	Directed by	Original release date
39	1	Chris Bianco	Pizzeria Bianco in Phoenix, Arizona, United States	Clay Jeter	September 7, 2022
40	2	Gabriele Bonci	Pizzarium Bonci in Rome, Italy	Brian McGinn	September 7, 2022
41	3	Ann Kim	Pizzeria Lola in Minneapolis, United States	Zia Mandviwalla	September 7, 2022
42	4	Franco Pepe	Pepe in Grani in Caiazzo, Italy	Brian McGinn	September 7, 2022
43	5	Yoshihiro Imai	Monk in Kyoto, Japan	Abigail Fuller	September 7, 2022
44	6	Sarah Minnick	Lovely's Fifty Fifty in Portland, Oregon, United States	Danny O'Malley	September 7, 2022

=== Chef's Table: Noodles (2024) ===
A fourth spin-off, titled Chef's Table: Noodles premiered on October 2, 2024.

No. overall	No. in season	Chef	Restaurant	Directed by	Original release date
45	1	Evan Funke	Funke in Los Angeles, United States	Brian McGinn	October 2, 2024
46	2	Guirong Wei	Master Wei in London, United Kingdom	Clay Jeter	October 2, 2024
47	3	Peppe Guida	Antica Osteria Nonna Rosa in Sorrento, Italy	Zia Mandviwalla	October 2, 2024
48	4	Nite Yun	Nyum Bai in Oakland, California, United States	Rayka Zehtabchi	October 2, 2024

=== Volume 7 (2024) ===
No. overall	No. in season	Chef	Restaurant	Directed by	Original release date
49	1	Nok Suntaranon	Kalaya in Philadelphia, United States	Brian McGinn	November 27, 2024
50	2	Kwame Onwuachi	Tatiana By Kwame Onwuachi in New York City, United States	Kevin Wilson, Jr.	November 27, 2024
51	3	Ángel León	Aponiente in Cádiz, Spain	Brian McGinn	November 27, 2024
52	4	Norma Listman and Saqib Keval	Masala y Maíz and Marigold in Mexico City, Mexico	Danny O'Malley	November 27, 2024

=== Chef's Table: Legends (2025) ===
A fifth spin-off, titled Chef's Table: Legends premiered on April 28, 2025.

No. overall	No. in season	Chef	Restaurant	Directed by	Original release date
53	1	Jamie Oliver	—	Brian McGinn	April 28, 2025
54	2	José Andrés	—	Clay Jeter	April 28, 2025
55	3	Thomas Keller	—	Clay Jeter	April 28, 2025
56	4	Alice Waters	—	David Gelb	April 28, 2025

== Chef's Table: Talks ==
This is a podcast series that features deep, intimate conversations centered around the favorite meals and food memories that altered the course of fascinating creative celebrities' lives. Each week, David Gelb (host) is joined by a chef, artist, musician, actor, or creative to talk about their shared love of food, stories from meals that have changed their lives, and the careers they have built in between.

The podcast is available in Youtube, Spotify, and Apple Podcasts.

No. in series	Title	Running time	Original release date	Link
1	"Evan Funke"	1:12:40	October 7, 2025	
Chef Evan Funke (Funke, Mother Wolf) joins David to talk about his early career at Spago under Wolfgang Puck, crafting the perfect burger, dealing with celebrities at his restaurant, what meal to cook to make someone fall in love with you, and so much more.
2	"Phil Rosenthal"	1:17:53	October 14, 2025	
Phil Rosenthal (Somebody Feed Phil) joins David to talk about tasting garlic for the first time at 19, Fruit of the Month club, why pizza is a universal food, Phil's new restaurant, and so much more.
3	"benny blanco"	44:30	October 20, 2025	
benny blanco joins David to talk about how his cooking obsession started with a George Foreman grill, getting fed Toro while DJing, why he cannot stop eating linguini with clams, how being a music producer is like being a therapist, and so much more.
4	"Jessica Barden"	58:11	October 27, 2025	
Jessica Barden joins David to talk about her childhood Heinz tomato soup obsession as a kid, filming Dune: Prophecy and how the Harkonnens and English people are similar, the work ethic that comes with growing up as a woman in Northern England, the meal that changed her life, and so much more.
5	"Wolfgang Puck"	1:47:26	November 3, 2025	
Wolfgang Puck (Spago, CUT) joins David to talk about his history with Wiener schnitzel, how the kitchen became his sanctuary from a difficult home life, how to eat a steak correctly, the Old Hollywood celebrities who dined at Spago, and so much more.
6	"Rudy Mancuso"	1:00:20	November 10, 2025	
Rudy Mancuso joins the show to talk about growing up with a fusion of Brazilian and Italian cooking, synesthesia, getting your first feature film made, Rudy composes theme music for this episode live on piano, and so much more.
7	"Alice Waters"	1:15:40	November 17, 2025	
Alice Waters joins the show to talk about pioneering the "farm to table" restaurant philosophy, her Chef's Table: Legends episode and what it was like bringing a film crew into her restaurant, why it is so important to teach people how to grow their own food, falling in love with her classmate in school, parties at Chez Panisse, the Baguette Quartet, cooking nettles, and so much more.
8	"Jason Stewart"	1:12:16	November 24, 2025	
Jason Stewart is here this week! David and Jason talk veganism, discovering weed, Kraft Mac n' Cheese, what's in Jason's fridge right now, failing to remake Del Taco at home, being a frequent music video extra, their favorite types of sushi, and so much more.
9	"Olivia Sui"	57:33	December 1, 2025	
Actress, comedian and filmmaker Olivia Sui joins David on the show this week! They talk about Olivia's first food memory, trying blowfish, the best restaurant to have a birthday dinner, improv, wigs, the true meaning of life, and so much more.
10	"Alvaro Clavijo is Pioneering Colombian Fine Dining"	1:08:24	December 8, 2025	
Alvaro Clavijo, head chef at El Chato (named 2025's Best Restaurant in Latin America by World's 50 Best) sits down with David to share the roller coaster journey that led him into fine dining. He talks about his beginnings as a dishwasher in Paris, lying to his mother about going to culinary school, accidentally giving his family food poisoning, serving "ants cream", purple potatoes, how to cook termites, and so much more.
11	"Logan Lerman is in Love With Food"	59:52	December 16, 2025	
Actor Logan Lerman joins David on Chef's Table: Talks this week! David and Logan talk about being a fruit freak, Logan's favorite meals to cook, the people that made him fall in love with food, auditioning to play Percy Jackson, his questionable tennis serve, the acting roles that have shaped his career, and so much more.
12	"Roy Shvartzapel Makes Unforgettable Panettone"	1:03:37	January 5, 2026	
Roy Shvartzapel of From Roy joins David on the show to explain the magic of panettone bread and debunk its poor reputation in the U.S. He talks about working at Ducasse, the simple dish his mother always made growing up that he will never forget, the meal that changed his life, his biggest nightmare story from fulfilling holiday rush orders, and so much more.
13	"Dominique Crenn Cooks with Emotion"	1:16:49	January 12, 2026	
Chef Dominique Crenn, owner of Atelier Crenn in San Francisco and the first female chef in the U.S. to earn 3-Michelin stars, joins David on the show this week. She opens up about how her outlook on life has changed since overcoming cancer, dealing with grief and putting her emotions into cooking, creating the menu for the film The Menu, the one kitchen item she would use as a weapon in a street fight, what she keeps in her fridge at home, and so much more.
14	"Sam Lerner is in a Steak Phase"	45:02	January 19, 2026	
Sam and David talk about saying goodbye to his character on The Goldbergs and career shifts after being a series regular on a beloved sitcom, learning to love food through his dad's home-cooked meals, growing up as a child actor, Sam's favorite restaurants in Italy, eating lobster pasta in a grotto, and so much more.
15	"BJ Novak Loves Chain Restaurants"	1:02:16	December 8, 2025	
BJ Novak is on the show this week!! David and BJ dive into the psyche of his character Ryan from The Office, times when comedy crosses the line, the experience of eating at Nozawa, the food scenes in LA vs. NYC, coming out against Italian food, and so much more.
16	"Burt Bakman Dreams of Brisket"	1:07:53	February 2, 2026	
Renowned Los Angeles BBQ expert Burt Bakman (Slab BBQ) joins us on the show this week! David and Burt talk about Burt's journey from real estate agent to one of LA's most popular pitmasters, the underground BBQ spot he operated out of his backyard, growing up on shawarma and falafel street food, the time a VIP choked on a piece of meat at one his events, overcooking Martha Stewart's tomahawk steak, the collection of fats he keeps in his fridge, and so much more.
17	"Ali Kolbert Wants a Bite of Rain"	52:17	February 10, 2026	
Comedian Ali Kolbert is on the show this week!! David and Ali talk about growing up eating homemade gnocchi made by her best friend's grandma, loving diner food, what she eats on tour, dinner dates in dark restaurants, why New York does not have "gluten free" figured out, and so much more.
18	"Ben Shenassafar is a Fan of Thick Burgers"	59:48	February 16, 2026	
Ben Shenassafar, (aka Ben Hundreds) joins David on the show this week! Ben talks to David about his unique career path from streetwear brand founder to restaurant owner, what makes a martini iconic, why sitting at a restaurant bar is the best spot in the house, the components of a perfect burger, the jar of his mom's pickled black garlic sitting in the back of his fridge, and so much more.
19	"Phillip Frankland Lee Brines Turkeys in a Trash Bag"	1:05:16	February 23, 2026	
Chef Phillip Frankland Lee (Scratch Restaurant Group) joins David on the show this week! Phillip talks with David about why 10 seats is the perfect amount for a sushi bar, why pastry chefs need more credit, holding a Michelin star at the same time as his brother Lennon, Phillip's secret for preparing Thanksgiving turkey, his experience behind the scenes competing on Top Chef, and so much more.
20	"Kwame Onwuachi Loves Chopped Cheese"	53:10	March 2, 2026	
Chef Kwame Onwuachi (Tatiana, Dōgon) joins David on the podcast! David and Kwame talk about eating curry goat and roti at his grandmother's house, the story of a nut allergy gone wrong on Christmas Eve, Kwame's mom giving him cooking notes, ayahuasca realizations, life lessons learned from golfing, and so much more.
21	"Nancy Silverton Tests Ice Cream Blindfolded"	1:04:06	March 9, 2026	
Nancy Silverton (Mozza, Max & Helen’s, La Brea Bakery) joins David on the show this week! Nancy and David talk about the Max & Helen's waffles that quickly went viral, Nancy's ultimate ice cream quality test, the meal at Chez Panisse that shaped her love of food, why her fridge at home is empty, hot takes on gluten free dishes, why you should never put mushrooms on margherita pizza, and so much more.
22	"Niki Nakayama Cooked Lobster for Spielberg"	1:01:02	March 16, 2026	
Chef, restaurateur, and Chef's Table Season 1 star Niki Nakayama is here this week! David and Niki talk about the 15th anniversary of her Michelin-starred restaurant n/naka, her iconic uni dish getting shown on billboards, why customers ask to eat in her parking lot, how to navigate marriage with your cooking partner, Niki's trip to Jiro's sushi bar, and so much more.
23	"Saqib Keval and Norma Listman Make Perfect Samosas"	1:00:37	March 23, 2026	
Chefs Saqib Keval and Norma Listman are on the show this week! Saqib, Norma and David talk about creating a healthy, sustainable workplace at their restaurant Masala y Maiz, cooks hiding to eat while on the job, perfecting samosas, making chai in the woods over a fire, living off quesadillas and coffee after having a kid, and so much more.
24	"Kris Yenbamroong Will Always Have Pork Toro On the Menu"	1:20:30	March 30, 2026	
LA-Based Chef and Restaurateur Kris Yenbamroong (Night+Market) is on the show this week! David and Kris talk about his family's beloved Thai restaurant (and how he almost ran it into bankruptcy when he first took over), Wolfgang Puck cooking with Kris' grandmother, why there's a weird photo of Al Gore hanging in Night + Market, the infamous Phuket chicken, eating super spicy foods as a kid to get cred with his family, and so much more.
25	"Jeremy Fall Appreciates a Happy Meal"	1:00:38	April 6, 2026	
Chef and Restaurateur Jeremy Fall (Drugstore) is on the show this week!! David and Jeremy talk about their love of a quality steakhouse, discuss what "American food" really means, talk about how immigrants are the heart of LA's food culture, why chefs could chill with nitrogen, break down the definition of a sandwich, and so much more.
26	"Maxwell Reis Drinks Sherry Cobblers"	1:16:03	April 13, 2026	
Maxwell Reis (Mírate, Daisy) joins David on a show this week! Maxwell breaks down little-known histories of spirits from why people associate rum with pirates to how fermentation started and where brown liquor comes from. They talk about agave goblins, the importance of supporting family-owned distributors, what causes hangovers (and why good mezcal does not make you hungover) and so much more!
27	"Justin Pichetrungsi Reinvented Taco Tuesdays"	53:14	April 20, 2026	
Justin Pichetrungsi (Anajak Thai) is on the show this week! David and Justin talk about Justin's 10 years working as a Disney Imagineer and leaving that career to take over his family's restaurant after his father's stroke, why the kitchen chaos of The Bear is so accurate, secret tricks servers use to turn tables, serving dinner in an alley, his kitchen weapon of choice, and so much more.
28	"Max & Helen's: The Secrets Behind the Most Viral Diner in LA"	53:44	May 4, 2026	
Mason & Lily Royal (Max & Helen's) join David on the show this week! They talk about getting married a week before opening the diner, why everyone wants to be cozy, Mason's 17th restaurant opening, Fried Chicken Wednesdays, debate what "American chees" actually means, dealing with stoned customers at a cannabis restaurant, and so much more.
29	"Carrying on Wolfgang Puck's Legacy Ft. Byron Puck"	58:20	May 11, 2026	
Byron Puck (President of Wolfgang Puck Fine Dining) joins David on the show this week! David and Byron talk about the moment he first realized his father Wolfgang Puck's level of fame on a boy scout camping trip, working in Spago's dish pit at age 12, family latke lessons, the time an egg-white cocktail exploded on a customer, why tuna cones will never leave the menu, what it means to be known as "the quintessential Hollywood restaurant", and so much more.
30	"How an LA Food Stall Won a Michelin Star Ft. Gilberto Cetina"	55:15	May 18, 2026	
Gilberto Cetina (Holbox) joins David in the kitchen this week!! Gilberto talks about the pressure of taking on his family's beloved restaurant Chichen Itza, how spearfishing as a teen made him fall in love with seafood, being a Michelin-starred seafood chef when his wife and daughter do not like fish, the catering horror story that made him almost ruin a wedding, and so much more.
31	"LA's King of Coffee Explains the Perfect Pourover Ft. Christopher "nicely" Abel Alameda"	1:07:43	May 25, 2026	
David is joined this week by Hooked owner and LA's resident coffee expert, Christopher "nicely" Abel Alameda! David and Nicely talk about how to make an incredible pourover, Haagen Daaz coffee ice cream, the idea of a Lego coffee shop, why every coffee bean is precious, and so much more.

== Reception ==
=== Critical response ===
The series has been well received since it aired in 2015 and has been praised for its cinematography, score, and production.

=== Accolades ===
Year	Award	Category	Recipient(s)	Result	Ref
Season 1
2015	Primetime Emmy Award	Outstanding Music Composition for a Series (Original Dramatic Score)	Duncan Thum for "Francis Mallmann"	Nominated	
2015	International Documentary Association Awards	Best Episodic Series	Chef's Table	Won	
2016	James Beard Foundation Award	Visual and Technical Excellence	Chef's Table	Won	
Season 2
2016	MPSE Golden Reel Awards	Best Sound Editing - Short Form Documentary in Television	William McGuigan	Nominated	
2016	Primetime Emmy Award	Outstanding Documentary or Nonfiction Series	Chef's Table	Nominated	
2016	Primetime Emmy Award	Outstanding Directing for a Nonfiction Program	David Gelb for "Gaggan Anand"	Nominated	
2016	Primetime Emmy Award	Outstanding Music Composition for a Series (Original Dramatic Score)	Duncan Thum for "Grant Achatz"	Nominated	
2016	International Documentary Association Awards	Best Episodic Series	Chef's Table	Nominated	
2017	James Beard Foundation Award	Best Television Program, on Location	Chef's Table	Won	
Season 3
2017	Primetime Emmy Award	Outstanding Documentary or Nonfiction Series	Chef's Table	Nominated	
2017	Primetime Emmy Award	Outstanding Cinematography for a Nonfiction Program	Will Basanta for "Virgilio Martinez"	Nominated	
2018	James Beard Foundation Award	Best Television Program, on Location	"Jeong Kwan"	Won	
Season 4
2018	Primetime Emmy Award	Outstanding Cinematography for a Nonfiction Program	Adam Bricker for "Corrado Assenza"	Nominated	
Legends
2025	Primetime Emmy Award	Outstanding Music Composition for a Documentary Series or Special (Original Dramatic Score)	Duncan Thum and David Bertok for "José Andrés"	Won	

== In other media ==
Chef's Table has been parodied numerous times. Gods of Food, which satirizes Chef's Table and the restaurant industry, was created Rekha Shankar for by the YouTube comedy channel CollegeHumor. The IFC series Portlandia parodied the series in an episode about an airport sushi chef.
