= Andrew Fried =

American film director

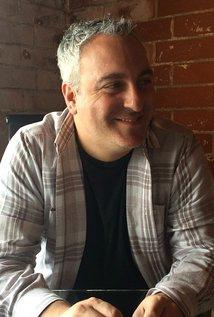
- A photo of Andrew Fried
- Born: Andrew Fried; February 10, 1976 (age 49); Long Beach, New York, U.S.
- Education: Emory University
- Occupations: Film producer; film director

Andrew Fried (born February 10, 1976) is an American documentary filmmaker, producer and director, and the president of Boardwalk Pictures. Fried is known for producing documentary films and television series, such as Chef's Table, The Black Godfather, Last Chance U, 7 Days Out, My Love, Men in Kilts, Booktube, Street Food, Cheer, Val and The Goop Lab with Gwyneth Paltrow. He directed the 2020 documentary film We Are Freestyle Love Supreme.

== Early life ==
Andrew Fried attended the Long Beach High School in New York.

== Career ==
Fried's earliest film work was in 2004, when he was an associate producer on Fade to Black, a documentary about the life and career of American rapper and record producer Jay-Z. Fried continued his career by producing the Sundance Channel series Iconoclasts, the 2006 documentary Black and White: A Portrait of Sean Combs, about American rapper Sean Combs, and the 2008 documentary Britney: For the Record for MTV.

Fried founded Boardwalk Pictures Inc., a Santa Monica-based production company, in 2010. The name of the company came from Fried's experiences growing up in Long Beach, New York. That same year, Fried directed and produced the 2010 documentary The Rocket Project, and produced The Oprah Winfrey Oscar Special, directed by Thomas Kail. From 2011 to 2015 Fried was the creative director of the Webby Awards, along with Kail. He produced the 2012 series The Conversation with Amanda de Cadenet.

=== Netflix, Chef's Table: 2015–2017 ===
Fried is one of the executive producers and directors of Chef's Table, which premiered in 2015 as Netflix's first original documentary series. During the process of filming the series, Fried and the other directors selected acclaimed chefs to be featured in the series. He directed the episodes featuring Niki Nakayama, Dominique Crenn, Nancy Silverton, Adeline Grattard, Christina Tosi and Bo Songvisava. Chef's Table has been nominated for three Emmy Awards. Fried also directed the 2016 spin-off Chef's Table: France.

On November 10, 2017, it was announced that Fried would produce the Starz-original documentary series In Fashion with Boardwalk Pictures, Rogue Atlas Productions and Lionsgate.

=== The Goop Lab, Cheer: 2018–present ===
In 2018, it was announced that Fried would be one of the executive producers of Lena Waithe's unscripted series You Ain't Got These, 7 Days Out, and the 2019 YouTube Original series BookTube.

The first season of 7 Days Out was released on December 21, 2018. The series documents the preparation for major events such as Chanel's Haute Couture Fashion Show and the Kentucky Derby in each episode.

Far From Home, a documentary about the lead up to the 2018 Winter Olympics in Pyeongchang, was executive produced by Fried for Olympic Channel. The series was filmed in 12 countries over a period of eight months, and was released February 5, 2018.Far From Home received the 2019 Venice TV Award in the Sport category.

Fried executive produced Action, a four-part documentary miniseries on the legalization of sports gambling. In May 2019, Chef's Table was renewed for a seventh and eighth season. The show was nominated for its third Emmy for "Outstanding Documentary or Nonfiction Series" in 2019.

Fried executive produced the 2020 Netflix documentary series Cheer, directed by Greg Whiteley. Cheer documented the lives of the Navarro College Bulldogs Cheer Team, and was praised for its portrayal of cheerleading, and for portraying the daily lives of its cast in a nuanced manner. The series was nominated for five Critics' Choice Real TV Awards and won two.

Fried directed We Are Freestyle Love Supreme, a documentary about the improv hip hop group Freestyle Love Supreme, which was produced by Lin-Manuel Miranda and Thomas Kail. We Are Freestyle Love Supreme was premiered at the 2020 Sundance Film Festival, and was released on Hulu on July 17, 2020.

He was executive producer of The Goop Lab, a Netflix series featuring Gwyneth Paltrow's Goop lifestyle company released 2020. On March 4, 2020, it was announced that Fried would executive produce Parenting Without Borders, a docuseries hosted by Jessica Alba. He executive produced the documentary series Home Game released June 26, 2020, and directed the episode "Highland Games".

Fried executive produced Street Food: Latin America which was released July 21, 2020. He also executive produced Last Chance U, which premiered its fifth and final season on July 28, 2020.

Fried is the director and executive producer of The One in November, a documentary about the 2020 Masters Tournament which aired on ESPN in 2021. He is also the executive producer of an untitled Bubba Wallace docuseries scheduled for release on Netflix in 2021.

== Filmography ==
=== Films ===
List of films showing year and credits
| Year | Title | Credited as | Notes |
|---|---|---|---|
| 2021 | The One in November | Director, executive producer | Documentary |
| 2020 | We Are Freestyle Love Supreme | Director, producer | Documentary |
| 2019 | Truth Be Told: Rick Ankiel | Executive producer | Documentary |
| 2019 | The Black Godfather | Executive producer | Documentary |
| 2017 | Piece of Work | Producer, director | Documentary short |
| 2012 | 20 Under 20: Transforming Tomorrow | Producer | Documentary |
| 2010 | The Rocket Project | Producer, director | Documentary |
| 2008 | Britney: For the Record | Producer | Documentary |
| 2008 | Rent: Filmed Live on Broadway | Co-producer | TV documentary |
| 2008 | Two Roads to the Taupo 1000 | Producer | TV documentary |
| 2006 | Black and White: A Portrait of Sean Combs | Producer | Documentary |
| 2004 | Fade to Black | Associate producer | Documentary |

=== Television ===
List of television series showing year and credits
| Year | Title | Credited as | Notes |
|---|---|---|---|
| TBA | Untitled Bubba Wallace documentary | Executive producer | |
| 2025 | Fit for TV: The Reality of The Biggest Loser | Executive producer | |
| 2024 | Polo | Executive producer | |
| 2023 | Encounters | Executive producer | |
| 2022 | Welcome to Wrexham | Executive producer | |
| 2021 | Men in Kilts: A Roadtrip with Sam and Graham | Executive producer | |
| 2020 | Street Food: Latin America | Executive producer | |
| 2020 | Home Game | Executive producer, director | |
| 2020 | You Ain't Got These | Executive producer | |
| 2020 | The Goop Lab | Executive producer | |
| 2020 | Cheer | Executive producer | |
| 2020 | In Fashion | Producer | |
| 2017–2020 | Last Chance U | Executive producer | |
| 2019 | Jenny Slate: Stage Fright | Executive producer | TV special |
| 2019 | BookTube | Executive producer | |
| 2019 | Street Food | Executive producer | |
| 2019 | Leavenworth | Executive producer | |
| 2019 | Action | Executive producer | |
| 2015–2019 | Chef's Table | Executive producer, director | |
| 2018 | 7 Days Out | Executive producer, director | |
| 2018 | Best Shot | Executive producer | |
| 2017 | Spooning... With Zac Efron | Executive producer, director | |
| 2016 | Fearless | Executive producer | |
| 2016 | Chef's Table: France | Executive producer. director | |
| 2015 | Road to the Show | Executive producer | |
| 2015 | That's Racist with Mike Epps | Executive producer | |
| 2014 | The Big Catch | Producer | TV special |
| 2014 | The Pecos League | Executive producer | |
| 2014 | Back of the Shop | Executive producer, director | |
| 2014 | Courtney Loves Dallas | Executive producer | |
| 2013 | GT Academy USA | Co-Executive Producer | |
| 2013 | Being: Mike Tyson | Executive producer | |
| 2012 | The Conversation | Co-Executive Producer | |
| 2011 | The Glee Project | Co-Executive Producer | |
| 2010 | Summit on the Summit | Producer | |
| 2010 | The Oprah Winfrey Oscar Special | Producer | |
| 2009 | Great Performances | Producer | |
| 2009 | StoryMakers | Producer | |
| 2007 | Fast Cars and Superstars: The Gillette Young Guns Celebrity Race | Producer | |
| 2005–2012 | Iconoclasts | Producer | |

== Awards and nominations ==
Fried has received three Emmy nominations for the Netflix documentary series Chef's Table. On May 16, 2017, American chef Ivan Orkin presented Fried with the 21st Annual Webby Award for "Documentary: Series in Film & Video" for his work on Chef's Table. Fried also won for the James Beard Media Award for Best Television Program on Location.

List of awards, showing association, year and results
| Year | Work | Award | Association | Results |
|---|---|---|---|---|
| 2022 | We Need to Talk About Cosby | Peabody Award (Documentary) | Peabody Award | Won |
| 2021 | We Are Freestyle Love Supreme | Best Music Film | Grammy Awards | Nominated |
| 2020 | Cheer | Best Unstructured Series | Critics' Choice Real TV Awards | Won |
| 2020 | Cheer | Best Limited Documentary Series | Critics' Choice Real TV Awards | Nominated |
| 2020 | Cheer | Best Sports Show | Critics' Choice Real TV Awards | Nominated |
| 2019 | The Black Godfather | Top Five Documentaries | National Board of Review | Won |
| 2019 | The Black Godfather | Best Documentary | AAFCA | Won |
| 2019 | Far From Home | —N/a | Venice TV Award | Won |
| 2019 | Chef's Table | Outstanding Documentary or Non-Fiction Series | Emmy Award | Nominated |
| 2018 | Last Chance U | Best Episodic Series | Independent Documentary Association | Nominated |
| 2018 | Best Shot | Best Limited Series | Independent Documentary Association | Nominated |
| 2018 | Chef's Table | Best Television Program, on Location | James Beard Media Award | Won |
| 2017 | Chef's Table | Documentary: Series in Film & Video | Webby Award | Won |
| 2017 | Chef's Table | Outstanding Documentary or Non-Fiction Series | Emmy Award | Nominated |
| 2016 | Chef's Table | Best Episodic Series | Independent Documentary Association | Nominated |
| 2016 | Chef's Table | Outstanding Documentary or Non-Fiction Series | Emmy Award | Nominated |
| 2015 | Chef's Table | Best Episodic Series | Independent Documentary Association | Won |
