= Rosalia Chay Chuc =

Mexican barbecue cook

- Born: Yaxuná, Yucatán, Mexico
- Culinary career
- Cooking style: BBQ

Rosalia Chay Chuc (born in Yaxuná, Mexico) is a Mexican barbecue chef, best known for her authentic Mayan dishes that date back to 400 AD. Netflix's Chef's Table: BBQ devoted an episode to her cooking.

Instead of in a restaurant, Chay serves her Mayan cooking for ten to twelve people from her house in Yaxuná, Yucatán. The house is now known as Cochinita Pibil (after the main course of the same name), where the food is prepared mainly from Chay's backyard píib and open-air kitchen with the help of her two sons and her sister. All her ingredients were naturally cultivated on her family's ancestral land. Booking for a two-and-a-half-hour weekend meal at Cochinita Pibil has been by e-mail, and the meal consists of a five-course tasting menu and pieces of a cochinita pibil.

Already well known in her area in the Yucatán Peninsula, Chay was introduced to the culinary world by chef Roberto Solis of Mérida, Yucatán, who in turn introduced her to world-famous Danish chef René Redzepi whose 2017 pop-up restaurant Noma Tulum (in Cancún) was inspired by Chay. Redzepi brought Chay to Noma Tulum to make the tortilla breads herself that were critical to the meal.

Ahau Tulum, Royalton CHIC Cancun and Rosewood Mayakoba have all introduced Chay and her coveted cochinita pibil to their patrons.

== Personal life ==
Chay has lived her entire life in Yaxuná. Aside from traditional Maya cooking that she learned at age 8, she has also learned from her ancestors traditional Yucatecan embroidery and wood carving; Chay sews her huipils herself. She has four children. She speaks a Mayan language and Spanish.
