= Will Goldfarb =

Indonesia-based American pastry chef

- Born: June 24, 1975 (age 51); Port Washington, New York, US
- Education: Duke University, Le Cordon Bleu, apprenticeship
- Culinary career
- Cooking style: Pastries
- Current restaurant
- Room4Dessert (Pastry chef)
- Awardss
- NYC's Rising Stars (StarChefs.com, 2006) * 10 Best Pastry Chefs in America (Pastry Art and Design) * Noteworthy Chef (Marquis Who's Who) * The World's Best Pastry Chef (Cacao Barry's The World's Best 50 Restaurants 2021)

Will Goldfarb (born June 24, 1975, in Port Washington, New York, US) is a Bali, Indonesia-based American pastry chef who was named The World's Best Pastry Chef in Cacao Barry's The World's Best 50 Restaurants 2021 and considered one of the pioneers of the dessert-only tasting menu. Originally from Port Washington, New York, Goldfarb owns with his wife Maria the Ubud, Bali, Indonesia-based restaurant and cocktail bar Room4Dessert. Goldfarb is one of the four pastry chefs featured in the 2018 Netflix series Chef's Table: Pastry, along with Jordi Roca of El Celler de Can Roca, Sicilian gelato maker Corrado Assenza, and Christina Tosi of David Chang's Momofuku Milk Bar chain.

== Early career ==
Goldfarb started working in restaurants at age 15, doing everything from being a valet parking staff to being a busboy, waiter, bartender, food runner, and host. Instead of proceeding to law school after finishing college at Duke University, he opted to go to Paris where he studied pastry cooking at Le Cordon Bleu while working at night. After being exhausted by this routine, he went back to New York City and worked with someone who put up large gastronomic events. He later decided to go back to Europe, however, and landed a six-month apprenticeship post in Florence. Later, he was hired as a family chef in the French Riviera. In 1999, inspired by the book The Flavors of the Mediterranean by Ferran Adrià, Goldfarb worked for El Bulli, where he came across apprentice chefs who would later make big names for themselves in the industry, namely Massimo Bottura, René Redzepi, and Grant Achatz, and where he worked side by side with Ferran's brother, Albert Adrià.

After a year and a half at El Bulli, Goldfarb went to Australia where he worked with chef Cheong Liew in Adelaide for a few months before moving to Sydney. In Sydney, he first worked in a building site in the morning and a fine-dining kitchen at night before he was called to work at Tetsuya's by Tetsuya Wakuda, where he worked for eight months before he finally sought a change anew. Goldfarb then went back to New York and worked briefly as Paul Liebrandt's pastry chef partner, staging culinary events at Papillon.

== Room4Dessert ==
When Goldfarb met his wife Maria while he was with Paul Liebrandt at Papillon, she encouraged him to put up his own restaurant, with the two conceptualizing what would soon become the Room4Dessert idea turned into reality, which opened in 2006. The restaurant received critical acclaim that led to a James Beard nomination for Goldfarb as Best Pastry Chef in America. When the restaurant closed after two years due to a disagreement with partners, the couple decided to move the restaurant to Bali, which however got delayed due to Goldfarb's cancer diagnosis followed by surgery and radiation therapy. In Bali, while still unable to work fully, Goldfarb first worked on the pastry programs at KU DÉ TA in Seminyak. Finally, in 2014, with a meager budget, he opened his new Room4Dessert, a 100 square-meter venue in the middle of what would later grow to a 3,000 square-meter garden with 300 varieties of plants and 100 types of trees tied to Goldfarb's dessert recipes.

With the regenerative farming and sustainable ethos of Room4Dessert and its menu under the direction of Goldfarb's wife, the restaurant also developed an academy where the couple runs month-long pastry workshops and also offers funding for apprenticeships abroad to restaurants like Belon. The couple also expanded their regenerative farming and permaculture gardening ideas to their community in Bali. Goldfarb, meanwhile, has lectured on dessert design around the world and launched his specialty pastry product of innovative ingredients, WillPowder.

=== Philosophy ===
Goldfarb has emphasized that his restaurant's farm is not focused on production solely but on process. In an interview, he stated that he requires a whole year to get just 3 ml. of clove essential oil from his garden. He further stated that his workers at the farm have learned to make a gummy without pectins or texturizers, using only the gelatinous core of the aloe vera plant. He added that while it is not bad to work with a seasonal fruit jam, "it is better to work with fresh products". As for serving healthy desserts, he said that "with less sugar and fat you feel better. It’s not a question of saving the world or making it more sustainable, and we pastry chefs are not doctors either, but your digestion is better if you eat less fats and sugars, and more plant-based products."

== Selected institutions in career ==
- Apprentice, commis, El Bulli, Roses, Spain, 1999–2000
- Pastry chef, The Ryland Inn, Whitehouse, New Jersey, 1999–2001
- Garde manger manager, Atlas, New York City, 2001
- Pastry chef, Papillon, New York City 2001–2002
- Pastry chef, Castine Inn, Maine
- Pastry chef, Morimoto by Masaharu Morimoto, Philadelphia, 2002–2004
- Pastry chef, Cru, New York City, 2004–2005
- Owner, Picnick, New York City, 2007
- Founder, AKWA, Experimental Cuisine Collective
- Owner, chef, Room 4 Dessert, since 2006–2008 in New York, 2012—present in Bali

== Books ==
- Room for Dessert: The Book, with a foreword by Albert Adrià

== Awards ==
- Named one of the 10 Best Pastry Chefs in America by Pastry Art and Design
- Won Starchef.com's "NYC's Rising Star" award
- Nominated, James Beard Foundation Award for Best Pastry Chef in America
- Named Noteworthy Chef, Marquis Who's Who
- Won, 2021 – Best World Pastry Chef by the 50Best World Restaurant List
