= Amazonas de Yaxunah =

Mexican women's softball team

The Amazonas de Yaxunah are a Mexican women's softball team from Yaxunah, Yaxcabá Municipality, Yucatán. The team consists of 26 players, aged 13 to 62. They have attracted attention for playing barefoot while wearing huipil, a traditional indigenous dress.

As of October 2023, the team is captained by Sitlali Yovana Poot Dzib, and coached by Joel Díaz Canul, her husband. Canul is also the son of another player, María Enedina Canul Poot.

A documentary on the team was released by ESPN on October 9, 2023.

== History ==
Las Amazonas started in 2018 as a loose collective of Maya girls and women in Yaxunah who played softball against each other and against boys from the community as part of a fitness program enacted by the Ministry for Social Development. The players used wooden planks or scraps for bats, and played without gloves. Six months after their formation, the team formed a connection with a women's softball team from Pisté, and began playing games against them. From there, the team began playing more games against other teams from Yucatán, Campeche, and Quintana Roo.

It was at this point that the players realized they needed a team name, and settled on "Las Amazonas", "The Amazons", in honor of the team's "tenacity and fierceness", and their perseverance in the face of traditional cultural values that decried women playing sports. Since the team has gained more attention, attitudes in the region have changed, and many community members support the team and its players.

The team first received nationwide attention in Mexico in 2019, when a video of the players wearing huipil during a game went viral.

In early 2021, the team won their first championship, beating Las Cardenales and Las Felinas de Kancabdzonot. In July, the team was invited to play at Kukulcán Alamo Park, the training location for the Leones de Yucatán.

In September 2023, in honor of Hispanic Heritage Month in the United States, Las Amazonas were invited to Arizona to play an exhibition game at Chase Field against the Phoenix University Falcons, which they won 22–3, and to attend a game between the Arizona Diamondbacks and the San Francisco Giants, where they threw the ceremonial first pitch.
