= Bongi =

Bongi is a unisex South African given name that may refer to

- Bongi Makeba (1950–1985), South African singer-songwriter
- Bongi Mbonambi (born 1991), South African rugby union footballer
- Bongi Ndaba (born 1972), South African producer and writer for television, actress and playwright
- Bongi Ntuli (born 1991), South African football striker
- Bongi Sithole, South African member of the African National Congress

== See also ==
- Bonci
