= Rodney Scott (pitmaster) =

American chef

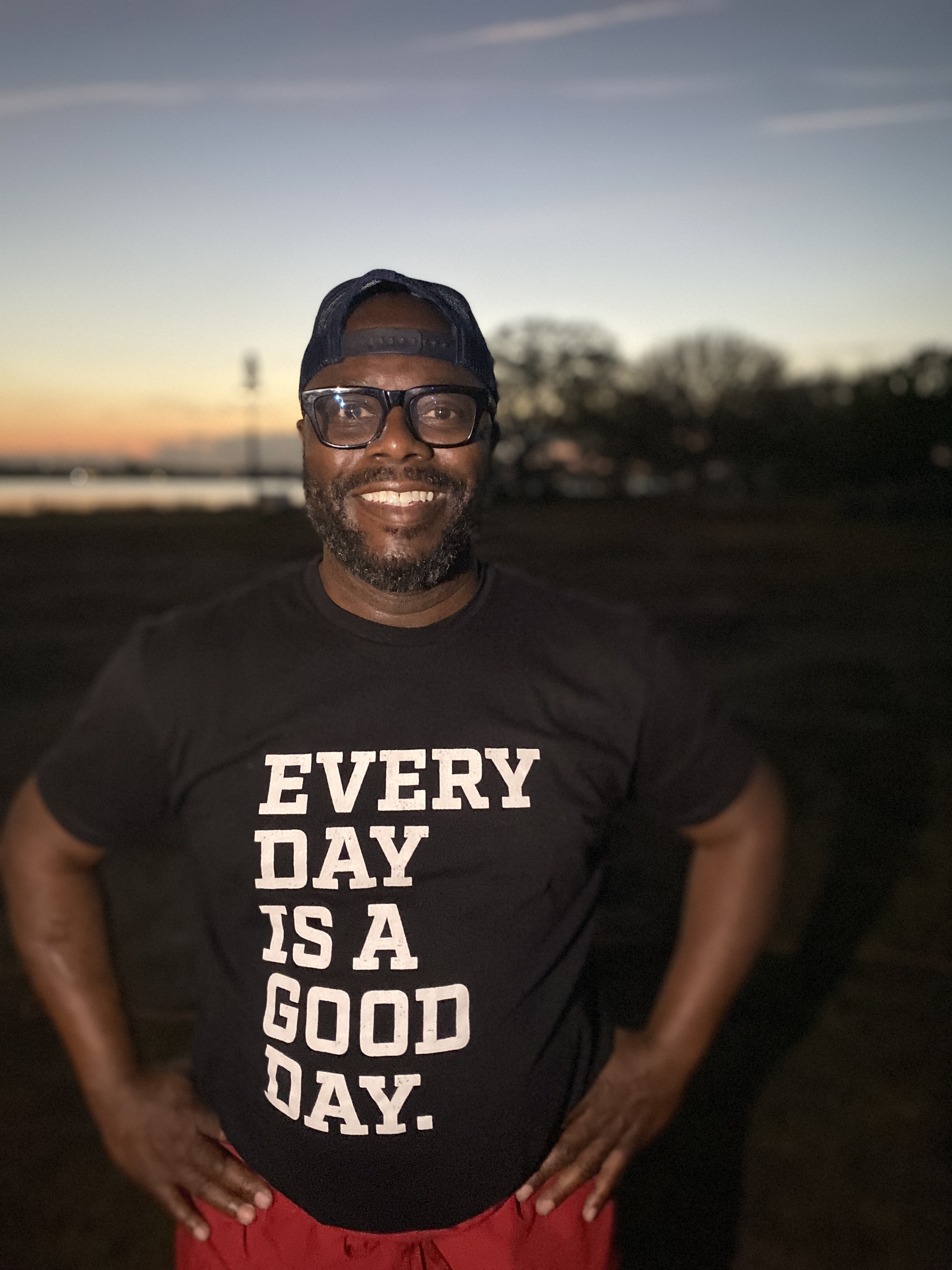
- Born: November 1, 1971 (age 54); Philadelphia, PA
- Culinary career
- Cooking style: Pitmaster
- Current restaurant: Rodney Scott's Whole Hog BBQ
- Award(s) won: James Beard Award 2018 Best Chef Southeast
- Website: https://rodneyscottsbbq.com/

Rodney Scott (born November 1, 1971) is an American chef and whole hog barbecue pitmaster from Hemingway, South Carolina. In 2018 Scott was named Best Chef Southeast by the James Beard Foundation, only the second pitmaster to win a James Beard chef award.

== Early life ==
Scott was born on November 1, 1971 in Philadelphia to Roosevelt and Ella Scott. He is an only child. In 1972 the family relocated to the Pee Dee area of South Carolina, where the family ran several businesses including a gas station, a variety store, a farm, and a barbecue restaurant. At around eleven, Scott first started barbecuing at his parents' business, Scott's Variety Store and Bar-B-Q in Hemingway, South Carolina, where at first the family would smoke a whole hog each week, expanding as demand increased until they were smoking seven or eight hogs a day. At 17 he was working for the family business full time.

== Career ==
In 2009 the family business was profiled by Southern food historian John T. Edge. In 2011, Scott took over the family barbecuing business. A sometime customer, Nick Pihakis, told him he was undercharging for his food. In 2016, he and his father quarreled and he left the family business to partner with Pihakis.

Scott opened Rodney Scott's BBQ in Charleston in 2017 and in Birmingham in 2019. As of March, 2021, a third location was set to open in Atlanta. A fourth location opened in December 2021 in Alabama. On May 3, 2026, it was reported all Rodney Scott's BBQ locations would close temporarily.

== Recognition ==
In 2018 Scott was named Best Chef:Southeast by the James Beard Foundation, only the second pitmaster to win a James Beard chef award. He was featured on Chef's Table: BBQ in 2020. The Washington Post called him a barbecue celebrity. In 2020 he was nominated to the Barbecue Hall of Fame. Texas Monthly called him "a whole hog legend". Daniel Vaughn of Texas Monthly wrote that Scott was "an undeniable master of the pit".

== Books ==
- Rodney Scott’s World of BBQ: Recipes and Perspectives from the Legendary Pitmaster
