= 7 Days Out =

2018 American docu-series

- Genre: Docu-series
- Directed by: Andrew Rossi; Andrew Fried; Robert Richman; Michael John Warren
- Country of origin: United States
- Original language: English
- No. of seasons: 1
- No. of episodes: 6

Production
- Executive producers: Andrew Fried; Dane Lillegard; Daniel Cottin; Andrew Rossi; Joe Zee
- Running time: 47 minutes
- Production company: Boardwalk Pictures

Original release
- Network: Netflix
- Release: December 21, 2018

7 Days Out is an American documentary television series that premiered on Netflix. The show's 6-episode first season was released on December 21, 2018.

Each episode of the show follows a major event, beginning with seven days before as organizers and employees plan the logistics and details prior to the event's start. Events from the first season include the Kentucky Derby, Westminster Dog Show, a League of Legends competitive tournament, the renovation of Eleven Madison Park, Chanel's Haute Couture fashion show, and the finale of the Cassini mission.

== Episodes ==
No.	Title	Original release date
1	"Westminster Dog Show"	December 21, 2018
2	"Eleven Madison Park"	December 21, 2018
3	"NASA's Cassini Mission"	December 21, 2018
4	"Kentucky Derby"	December 21, 2018
5	"CHANEL Haute Couture Fashion Show"	December 21, 2018
6	"League of Legends"	December 21, 2018
