= Alexandre Couillon =

French chef

- Born: 9 December 1975 (age 50); Dakar, Senegal
- Culinary career
- Cooking style: Haute cuisine
- Rating
- Michelin stars
- Current restaurant
- La Marine
- Website: Official website

Alexandre Couillon (born December 9, 1975) is a French chef based in Noirmoutier. Featured in the 2018 Netflix documentary series Chef's Table: France, Couillon's seafood restaurant La Marine, which he inherited from his parents and which he now runs with his wife Celine, has received a three-star rating from the Michelin Guide.

== Early life and career ==
When Couillon was six years old, his parents bought La Marine, a small cafe in Noirmoutier-en-l'Île. Initially not interested in cooking, he decided to pursue a career in the culinary world after watching Michel Fornareso cook on TV. He applied for a job under Fornareso, demonstrating his early talent with his mother's apple pie recipe.

== La Marine ==
Couillon later worked for Michelin star-awarded chef Michel Guerard, but soon got a call from his father who offered him to take over their island restaurant. Couillon and his wife, after some hesitation, moved back to the island to save the ailing restaurant. Toward the end of a seven-year trial period for the restaurant, a visiting journalist covered the restaurant that led to a first Michelin star for the cafe months later.

The award inspired Couillon and his team to experiment with new dishes. But it was an intern's mistake with the squid bouillon that led Couillon to apply the messed-up sauce to a fresh oyster on a big white plate, which in turn led to a slew of other simple compositions that reflected life on Noirmoutier. Couillon's new direction earned his restaurant its second Michelin star.

The Michelin Guide has stated that Couillon's "six- or nine-course tasting menu (is) constantly renewed according to the tight flow consignments from the garden and the fishermen. The quality of the fish, seafood and vegetables is exceptional." Couillon has also put up Petit Couillon, a shop selling produce from his local artisan and farmer partners.

In 2017 he was awarded the Gault Millau. In 2020, he was listed as the #50 chef in the Best Chef Awards' Top 100 list.

The Michelin Guide awarded him a third star for La Marine in 2023.

== Philosophy ==
Couillon has stated that "It’s important to promote our products to show that they exist. We don’t work with products that come from far away. And that’s why our artisans are so important.”

He said that his goal, in contrast to what he has been taught, has been "to imagine that there is no separation between the sea and the kitchen. That’s what I was missing. That is the path of the future.”

Michelin has quoted him as having said, "We live in tune with nature, which alone dictates, day after day, what will be on the menu at our restaurant."

== Bibliography ==
Chef Alexandre Couillon's French Atlantic Cuisine, by Jacky Durand, Alexandre Couillon and Laurent Dupont, with photographs by the Laurent Dupont Collection (Hors Collection). [2016, Les Editions de l'Epure, 19 x 25, 256 pages]
