= Snow's BBQ =

Restaurant in Texas, U.S.

- Location within Texas Location within the United States

Restaurant information
- Established: March 1, 2003; 23 years ago
- Owner: Kerry Bexley
- Head chef: Tootsie Tomanetz
- Food type: Texas barbecue
- Dress code: Casual
- Location: 516 Main Street, Lexington, Lee County, Texas, 78947, United States
- Coordinates: 30.413317°N 97.009857°W
- Website: snowsbbq.com

Snow's BBQ is a renowned Texas barbecue restaurant located in the small town of Lexington roughly an hour outside of Austin, Texas to the east. Snow's is open only on Saturdays from 8 AM until they run out of meat, often around noon. The unusual hours were originally kept to take advantage of a weekly Saturday livestock auction nearby at 12:30 PM.

The name comes from owner Kerry Bexley's lifelong nickname. As Bexley told it:

"When my mother was pregnant, an older gentleman here in town asked my brother, 'Do you want a little brother or a little sister?' He said, 'I want a little snowman.' So when I hit the deck, that's what I was called. Snowman."

In May 2008, Texas Monthly rated Snow's BBQ as the number-one BBQ joint in Texas. In May 2013, Snow's was ranked number 2 on the magazine's Top 50 list of the best barbecue in Texas. The 2017 list saw Snow's trade places with Austin's Franklin Barbecue to retake the number 1 position. In early 2018, 82-year-old pitmaster Tootsie Tomanetz was nominated as a semifinalist for a James Beard Award.

Snow's BBQ has also been labeled as "The Best Texas BBQ in the World" by The New Yorker in its article titled "By Meat Alone" written by Calvin Trillin in the November 24, 2008, issue.

Snow's BBQ received significant publicity because of the 2020 Netflix series Chef's Table: BBQ. Episode 1 showcased Snow's BBQ and the story of Tootsie Tomanetz, the pitmaster responsible for the cooking.

== See also ==
- List of barbecue restaurants
