= Tootsie Tomanetz =

American barbecue cook

- Born: April 21, 1935 (age 91)
- Occupation: Barbecue pitmaster
- Years active: 1966-present
- Known for: Texas hill country barbecue

Tootsie Tomanetz (born April 21, 1935) is an American pitmaster and restaurateur. She is pitmaster at Snow's BBQ.

== Early life ==
Tomanetz was born on April 21, 1935. Tomanetz was raised on a farm outside of Lexington, Texas. She was the oldest of three children. She recalls growing and canning most of their own food and homesewn clothing.

== Barbecue career ==
Tomanetz is the pitmaster at Snow's BBQ in Lexington, Texas, which in 2008 was named the best barbecue in Texas by Texas Monthly. Her style of barbecue is a style originating in the Texas hill country.

Tomanetz began cooking barbecue in 1966 at City Meat Market in Giddings, Texas, when they were shorthanded. She learned from Orange Holloway. She became pitmaster at a second City Meat Market in Lexington, and she and her husband eventually bought it, selling it after her husband had a stroke in 1996. She got a job in the maintenance department for the local school district. In 2003 she started working Saturdays at Snow's; as of 2024 she was still working as pitmaster.

She was featured on 2020's Chef's Table: BBQ.

== Recognition ==
Tomanetz was inducted into the Barbecue Hall of Fame in 2018. She was a semifinalist for the James Beard Award for Best Chef:Southwest the same year.

== Personal life ==
Tomanetz married Edward Tomanetz, who worked as a butcher at City Meat Market in Giddings, Texas, in July 1956 when she was 21; she was widowed in 2015. The couple had three children. Tomanetz lives in Giddings and as of 2024 was still working in the local school district's maintenance department. She is Lutheran.
