= Scott's Variety Store and Bar-B-Q =

- Interactive map of Scott's Variety Store and Bar-B-Q

Restaurant information
- Established: 1972
- Owners: Sam Wilson and Dominic Scott
- Previous owners: Roosevelt and Ella Scott
- Food type: Whole hog barbecue
- Location: Hemingway, South Carolina
- Coordinates: 33.7433°N 79.4750°W

Scott's Variety Store and Bar-B-Q is a restaurant in Hemingway, South Carolina.

== History ==
The restaurant was opened as a convenience store and gas station in 1972, by Roosevelt and Ella Scott. It became known for serving whole hog barbecue platters and sandwiches. Their son Rodney Scott was pitmaster of the restaurant until 2017, when he left to found Rodney Scott's Whole Hog BBQ. Roosevelt died in 2010, followed by Ella in 2023. The restaurant closed for five months after Ella's death before being reopened in May 2024, by Ella's brother Sam Wilson and grandson Dominic Scott.
