= Jeong Kwan =

Buddhist monk and chef (born 1957)

Jeong Kwan (born 1957) is a Seon Buddhist nun and chef of Korean temple cuisine. She lives in the Chunjinam Hermitage at the temple Baegyangsa in South Korea, where she cooks for fellow nuns and monks, as well as occasional visitors. Jeong Kwan has neither formal culinary training nor restaurant affiliation.

The fifth of seven siblings, Jeong Kwan was born in Yeongju in North Gyeongsang Province and grew up on a farm. She learned to make noodles by hand at age 7. She ran away from home at 17, and two years later joined an order of Seon nuns, where she discovered her calling of spreading dharma through cooking. Jeong Kwan's recipes use aubergines, tomatoes, plums, oranges, pumpkin, tofu, basil, chilli pepper, and other vegetables, which she grows herself. In addition to being strictly vegan, Jeong Kwan's recipes omit garlic and onions, which some Buddhists believe may interfere with meditation.

Jeong Kwan has influenced chefs including Mingoo Kang, of the Seoul restaurant Mingles, and René Redzepi, of Noma in Copenhagen. Her friend Eric Ripert, a fellow Buddhist, has invited her to New York City to cook for private audiences at Le Bernardin.

Jeong Kwan was featured in a 2017 episode of the Netflix series Chef's Table, as well as the 2026 Netflix docuseries The Philosopher's Kitchen.
