= Back of the Shop =

- Directed by: Andrew Fried

Production
- Producers: Relativity Media and Boardwalk Pictures
- Production locations: Jordan Sport Barbershop, Bronx, New York

Original release
- Network: Fox Sports 1
- Release: May 24, 2014

Back of the Shop is a sports talk show with sports and entertainment superstars as the hosts. The show takes place in the Bronx, New York at Jordan Sport Barbershop. After first being aired on May 24, 2014 with David Ortiz, Alfonso Soriano, Iman Shumpert and Larry Johnson as guests, it now airs regularly on Tuesdays at 8:30 p.m. ET on Fox Sports 1. Because of the atmosphere, conversations remain unfiltered and allow the audience to gain insight on the thoughts of the most popular celebrities. Other guest stars include Snoop Dogg, Robinson Canó, Amar'e Stoudemire, Dez Bryant, Curtis Granderson, Gary Sheffield and more. Jordan Sport Barbershop is located in the Bronx, New York and is owned by Jose Moises "Jordan" Lopez, who is the official barber of the New York Yankees and New York Mets. Back of the Shop is produced by Relativity Media and Boardwalk Pictures and is directed by Andrew Fried.
