= Nok Suntaranon =

Thai chef

- นก สุนทรนนท์
- Born: Yan Ta Khao, Trang, Thailand
- Spouse: Ziv Katalan

Chutatip "Nok" Suntaranon (Thai: จุฑาทิพ "นก" สุนทรนนท์) is a Thai chef and owner of Kalaya in Philadelphia, Pennsylvania, United States. In 2023, she received the James Beard Foundation Award for best chef, Mid-Atlantic.

== Early life ==
Suntaranon was born in Yan Ta Khao, a district in Trang province, where her mother Kalaya operated a curry paste stall at a local market. Her father had a problematic relationship with alcohol; her mother sent her to Bangkok to live with her grandmother to get her away from the dysfunction at home and give her educational opportunities.

The family lost their house after her father borrowed from loan sharks and used the house as collateral. He died by suicide soon after she graduated from college.

== Career ==
Suntaranon worked as a business class flight attendant on Thai Airways.

After her second marriage she relocated to Philadelphia and opened Kalaya, named for her mother, in April 2019.

In 2024, Suntaranon announced the publication of a cookbook Kalaya's Southern Thai Kitchen. Nok was featured in volume 7 of Chef's Table.

== Recognition ==
In 2020 both Esquire and Food & Wine named Kalaya one of the best new restaurants in the country. In 2023, Suntaranon received the James Beard Foundation Award for Best Chef: Mid-Atlantic.

== Personal life ==
She was married to the owner of an Italian restaurant in Bangkok. The marriage ended in divorce. She met Wharton School professor Ziv Katalan onboard a flight to New York City, and they married.
