= Franco Pepe =

Italian pizzaiolo

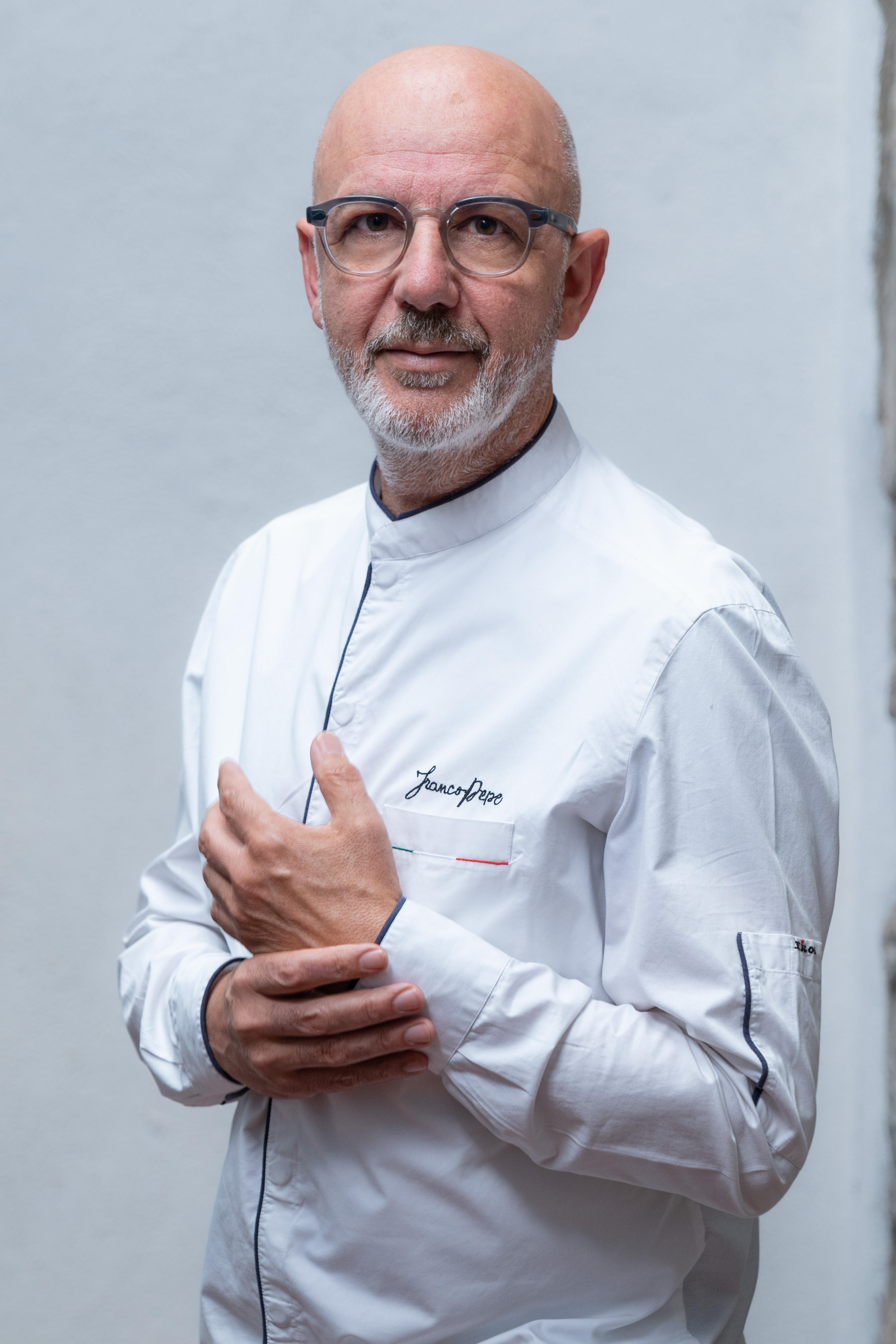
- Pepe in 2023
- Born: July 18, 1963; Caiazzo, Caserta, Italy
- Culinary career
- Cooking style: Italian cuisine; pizza
- Current restaurant: Pepe in Grani
- Website: www.pepeingrani.it

Franco Pepe (born July 18, 1963) is an Italian award-winning pizzaiolo, internationally recognized as one of the best in the world. He is the owner of Pepe in Grani restaurant in his hometown of Caiazzo, Caserta, and is featured in one of the episodes of the Netflix docu-series Chef's Table: Pizza.

== Career ==
His grandfather was a baker, while his parents owned a restaurant called Osteria Pizzeria Pepe in Piazza Porta Vetere in Caiazzo, town of almost 6,000 inhabitants in the Campania region, near Naples. This is where Franco Pepe learned the trade by working as a pizza maker with his brothers.

Pepe's father died in 1996, and he and his brothers felt a responsibility for continuing their father's business. Since he had a different vision from his brothers, Franco Pepe left the family business to start his own nearby.

In 2012 he opened his restaurant Pepe in Grani in a historic mansion built in the 18th century in the historic center of Caiazzo.

In 2022 he created Pizza Hub, a digital gastronomy guide to visit the places in Upper Caserta region, where the raw materials he uses in his cooking come from.

In 2022 he was featured in one of the episodes of the Netflix docu-series Chef's Table: Pizza.

== Methods ==
Franco Pepe uses a traditional method for preparing the dough, and has a specialized team who prepares it daily by hand with a mix of three different types of flour.

Pepe's most popular pizza is the Margherita Sbagliata, or "Mistaken Margherita", which places mozzarella as the base. After the pizza is cooked, an uncooked tomato sauce and basil sauce garnish it. Another popular dish of his is a fried pizza topped with apricot jam and buffalo ricotta cheese called La Crisommola.

== Awards and honours ==
Franco Pepe won in 2017 the Il Cappello d'Oro award for promoting Campania culture through his dishes, while in 2019 and 2020 he received the distinction of Cavaliere dell'Ordine al Merito della Repubblica Italiana.

In addition, he has been recognized as the Best Pizza Maker of the Year by Food and Travel magazine and consecutively Best Pizzaiolo of the Year at 2021 and 2022 Best Chef Awards. He also has won the Pizza Awards Italia in 2019.

Pepe in Grani has been awarded with 'tre spicchi' by the Italian gastronomic magazine Gambero Rosso for ten consecutive years, it ranks first in the 'Europe Cheap Eats' section of the Opinionated About Dining 2020 guide, it is listed as the most voted pizzeria in the world in Daniel Young's book Where to eat pizza and it was the first pizzeria to be part of the '50 Best Discovery' of The World's 50 Best Restaurants in 2019.

His pizzas have been awarded in the categories Best Pizza in Italy, Best Traditional Pizza and Best Pizza in Campania at Pizza Awards Italia and the Margherita Sbagliata and the Crisommola have been chosen as Pizzas of the Year by Gambero Rosso, while the 'Scarpetta ' and 'Ananascosta' as Dish of the Year by Identità Golose. In 2018 his pizzas were ranked by Michelin as the best in the world.

Food critic Jonathan Gold visited and wrote an article in Food & Wine calling Pepe's pizza "probably the best pizza in the world". Faith Willinger, author of Eating in Italy, calls out Pepe's pizza as her favorite in Italy, while Nancy Silverton commented that Pepe is world's best pizza maker.
