= Chris Bianco =

American chef (born 1960)

- Born: The Bronx, New York, U.S.
- Known for: Italian food
- Culinary career
- Current restaurants: * Pizzeria Bianco, Phoenix, Arizona (1993–present), * Pizzeria Bianco, Los Angeles, California (2022–present), * Tratto, Phoenix, Arizona, * Bar Bianco, Phoenix, Arizona, * Pane Bianco, Phoenix, Arizona
- Awards won: * 2003 James Beard Foundation Award, Winner, Best Chefs in America, * 2000 James Beard Foundation Award, Nominee, Best Chefs in America, * 2020 James Beard Foundation Award, Nominee, Outstanding Restaurant for Pizzeria Bianco

Chris Bianco is an American James Beard Award-winning chef and restaurateur in Phoenix, Arizona. He operates restaurants in Arizona and California.

== Early life ==
Bianco was born in the Bronx in 1960, and grew up in Ossining, New York. He had asthma as a child, forcing him to stay inside, where he watched his aunt cook. At age 13 he began working at a local pizzeria. In 1985, he won two plane tickets to anywhere in the United States and, on a whim, chose to go to Phoenix. When he got there, he felt connected to the place. Bianco took chef's jobs in Italy and Santa Fe, N.M, and returned to Phoenix in 1993.

== Culinary career ==
Bianco began making mozzarella in his apartment and selling it to Italian restaurants. Later, Guy Coscos, a specialty grocer in Phoenix offered him the opportunity to make and sell pizzas in the corner of his store. Bianco's pizza was popular and he realized he could make pizza for a living.

Bianco opened Pizzeria Bianco with business partner Susan Pool, in 1993. In 1996, the restaurant moved to 623 East Adams Street, the historic site of Baird Machine Shop in Heritage Square.

In 2010, Bianco was hospitalized due to a severe asthma attack and pneumonia. The reason was years of exposure to airborne flour and smoke from making pizza, which caused him to pivot away from pizza-only restaurants and toward pasta. Bianco also operates Bar Bianco, Tratto, and Pane Bianco, located in Midtown Phoenix.

In September 2022, Bianco was featured in the Netflix documentary series Chef's Table: Pizza.

== Awards ==
Bianco's first James Beard Award nomination was in 2000, and he won the James Beard Award in 2003, when he was the first pizzaiolo to be named Best Chef Southwest.

In 2022, Bianco was named Outstanding Restaurateur by the James Beard Foundation, the industry’s highest award.
