= Best Shot (TV series) =

Television series

- Title screen from the first episode
- Genre: Reality; Docuseries
- Directed by: Michael John Warren
- Starring: Jay Williams
- Composers: Roahn Hylton; Jacob Yoffee
- Country of origin: United States
- Original language: English
- No. of seasons: 1
- No. of episodes: 8

Production
- Executive producers: LeBron James; Maverick Carter; Andrew Fried; Dane Lillegard; Jordan Wynn; Michael John Warren
- Producers: Walter Matteson; Nan Sandle
- Cinematography: Gregory Purpura
- Running time: 22–51 minutes
- Production companies: SpringHill Entertainment; Boardwalk Pictures; Blue Ribbon Content

Original release
- Network: YouTube Premium
- Release: July 18, 2018

Best Shot is an American documentary series directed by Michael John Warren and starring Jay Williams. The series follows Newark Central High School's basketball team, showing the lives of the players and the fortunes of the team, as they are mentored by Williams. It premiered on July 18, 2018 on YouTube Premium. The series is executive produced by LeBron James, Maverick Carter, Andrew Fried, Dane Lillegard, Jordan Wynn, and Warren.

== Premise ==
Best Shot follows Williams and "the lives of the students he hopes to inspire – as the ESPN analyst shares his journey from his championship college career at Duke to his post-crash loneliness and unsuccessful attempts at an NBA comeback – and mentors an inner-city high school team."

== Production ==
=== Development ===
On November 20, 2017, it was announced that YouTube had given the production a series order consisting of eight episodes. Michael John Warren is set to direct the series from SpringHill Entertainment and Boardwalk Pictures in association with Blue Ribbon Content. LeBron James and Maverick Carter will executive produce alongside Andrew Fried, Dane Lillegard and Jordan Wynn of Boardwalk Pictures and Warren. Alongside the release of the series official trailer, it was confirmed that the series would premiere on July 18, 2018.

=== Marketing ===
Alongside the initial series announcement, YouTube released a teaser trailer for the series. On June 11, 2018, the official trailer for the series was released.

== Episodes ==
No.	Title	Directed by	Original release date
1	"We All We Got"	Michael John Warren	July 18, 2018
2	"Leave This Town"	Michael John Warren	July 18, 2018
3	"Better Than My Parents"	Michael John Warren	July 18, 2018
4	"Lil Bad Choices"	Michael John Warren	July 18, 2018
5	"Don't Forget About Me"	Michael John Warren	July 18, 2018
6	"As One"	Michael John Warren	July 18, 2018
7	"Where You Wanna Be"	Michael John Warren	July 18, 2018
8	"We All We Need"	Michael John Warren	July 18, 2018
