= Rodney Scott's Whole Hog BBQ =

Restaurant in Charleston, South Carolina

- Location of Rodney Scott's BBQ

Restaurant information
- Owners: Rodney Scott and Nick Pihakis
- Head chef: Rodney Scott
- Food type: Barbecue
- Location: 1011 King Street, Charleston, South Carolina, United States
- Coordinates: 32.8007°N 79.9500°W
- Seating capacity: <128
- Website: Official website

Rodney Scott's Whole Hog BBQ is a barbecue restaurant in Charleston, South Carolina. Specializing in (whole hog) pulled pork barbecue and owned by Rodney Scott and Nick Pihakis, it opened in February 2017.

== Description ==
The restaurant is in Charleston, South Carolina, and can seat close to 128 diners. Drive-through and delivery are also available. It specializes in pulled pork, whole hog barbecue slow-smoked with hardwood charcoal and served with a spicy vinegar sauce. Scott uses MSG, which he calls a "flavor maker", in his spice rub. Other dishes on the menu include fried catfish, a rib eye steak sandwich, spare ribs, and banana pudding.

== History ==
Rodney Scott was raised in the hamlet of Nesmith, South Carolina. His parents, Roosevelt and Ella, were hog farmers who opened the Hemingway-based Scott's Variety Store and Bar-B-Q around 1972. Having assumed full ownership of Scott's Bar-B-Q in 2011, Scott partnered with restaurateur Nick Pihakis to expand the family business. Their joint venture, Rodney Scott's Whole Hog BBQ, opened in February 2017. The restaurant's premises previously belonged to fried chicken restaurant Chick’s Fry House. Scott and the restaurant were featured in the third episode of the Netflix food documentary series Chef's Table BBQ (2020). Following the release of the Chef's Table episode, the restaurant "set sales records three days in a row", with queues lasting for up to an hour.

In early May 2026, it was reported that the Rodney Scott's Whole Hog BBQ's operation had been affected by lawsuits and liens, and that all locations would temporarily close.

== Reception ==
In May 2018, Scott was named "Best Chef Southeast" at the James Beard Foundation Awards. In May 2020, he was nominated as a semi-finalist for the Barbecue Hall of Fame. Maria Yagoda of Food and Wine listed the restaurant as one of the "40 Most Important Restaurants of the Past 40 Years". Daniel Vaughn of Texas Monthly wrote that Scott was "an undeniable master of the pit". Writing for food website Eater, Bill Addison praised the "uniquely wonderful spirit" of the restaurant, but suggested that the quality of the barbecue was inconsistent. Allston McCrady of Charleston Magazine described the restaurant's rib eye sandwich as "better than any Philly cheesesteak I’ve ever tasted". Hanna Raskin of the Post and Courier wrote that the food at Rodney Scott's BBQ was a "shade less satisfying" than that of the family restaurant in Hemingway.

== See also ==
- List of Michelin Bib Gourmand restaurants in the United States
