= Ann Kim =

American chef

- Education: Columbia University
- Culinary career
- Current restaurant(s): Pizzeria Lola, Hello Pizza
- Previous restaurant(s): Sooki & Mimi, Kim's, Young Joni
- Award(s) won: 2019 James Beard Foundation Award, Best Chef: Midwest

Ann Kim is a James Beard Award-winning chef and restaurateur in Minneapolis, Minnesota.

== Early life ==
Kim immigrated from South Korea to the United States in 1977 at the age of four, settling in Apple Valley, Minnesota with her sister, parents and grandmother. She was in the theater program at Apple Valley High School, and she pursued an English Degree at Columbia University in New York City, graduating in 1995. She returned to Minneapolis and worked as an actress for eight years before deciding to enter the restaurant business.

== Culinary career ==
Recalling the pizza she had enjoyed in New York, Kim began to study pizza making, training at Tony Gemignani's International School of Pizza in San Francisco. In 2011, Kim and her partner (and future husband) Conrad Leifur opened Pizzeria Lola in Minneapolis. When reviewing the restaurant for Food & Wine, Andrew Zimmern said: "Yes, it’s true, Minnesota has the best pizza in America." Guy Fieri visited Pizzeria Lola in 2012 for the Food Network show Diners, Drive-Ins and Dives. In 2012, Kim and Leifur opened a second restaurant in Edina, Minnesota, a smaller pizzeria called Hello Pizza, selling pies and slices from a counter.

In 2016, Kim and Leifur opened a third restaurant named Young Joni in northeast Minneapolis, expanding from pizza to a broader menu featuring hearth cooking and Korean influences. It was named one of the best new restaurants in America by Eater and GQ magazine. The Star Tribune named it its 2017 Restaurant of the Year; the Star Tribune's critic Rick Nelson commented that "One of the many reasons why this is such an exciting era for Twin Cities dining can be summed up in two words: Young Joni."

In 2019, Kim won the James Beard Award for Best Chef: Midwest.

Kim opened her fourth restaurant, Sooki & Mimi, in the Uptown neighborhood of Minneapolis in 2021. Focusing on tortillas and other dishes created using masa made from hand-ground nixtamalized corn, the menu was inspired by corn tortillas Kim ate in the Valle de Guadalupe which were so good they brought tears to her eyes. In 2023, she closed this restaurant and opened a new one on November 7, 2023, in the same space, simply called Kim's. On August 22, 2024, she announced that Kim's would close on August 30, 2024, two months after the restaurant's employees voted to unionize. The statement attributed the closing to "ongoing financial losses." Previously in July 2024, Kim's cut weekend lunch service and closed its basement bar due to a decline in business.

In 2022, Kim was featured on episode 3 of Netflix's Chef's Table: Pizza, the seventh season of the Chef's Table series. The episode focused on Kim's culinary career in relation to pizza.

== Response to worker union organizing ==
On May 28, 2024, workers at Kim's restaurant in the Uptown neighborhood of Minneapolis delivered a petition to Kim declaring their intent to unionize. Workers are organizing with Unite Here Local 17, a local hospitality union. Worker issues include consistent scheduling so they can better anticipate their paychecks. Kim decided not to voluntarily recognize the union, so the restaurant workers voted on June 27, 2024 to propose unionizing. More than 70% of the restaurant's workers signed the initial petition. Messages Kim sent to staff trying to convince them to vote no on unionizing in an attempt to union bust were leaked. On June 27, 2024, the workers voted to unionize. On August 22, 2024, Kim announced that the restaurant would be closing. Kim’s restaurant group, Vestalia Hospitality, claimed it was due to "ongoing financial losses". On August 30th, 2024, the restaurant permanently shuttered.
