= Bonci =

Bonci is an Italian surname, it may refer to:

- Alessandro Bonci (1870–1940), Italian lyric tenor
- Antonello Bonci, Italian neurologist and neuropsychopharmacologist
- Fabio Bonci (born 1949), Italian footballer
- Gabriele Bonci, pizza maker and international brand
- Virginia Bonci (1949–2020), Romanian athlete

== See also ==
- Teatro Alessandro Bonci, opera house in Cesena, Italy
