= Men in Kilts: A Roadtrip with Sam and Graham =

- Genre: Documentary
- Directed by: Kevin Scott Johnston
- Countries of origin: United States; United Kingdom
- Original language: English
- No. of seasons: 2
- No. of episodes: 12

Production
- Executive producers: Sam Heughan; Graham McTavish; Alexander Norouzi; Dane Lillegard; Kevin Johnston; Andrew Fried
- Producer: Ursula Collison
- Production companies: Sony Pictures Television Studios; Boardwalk Pictures; Great Glen Company

Original release
- Network: Starz
- Release: February 14, 2021 – September 1, 2023

Men in Kilts: A Roadtrip with Sam and Graham is an American documentary television series that follows Sam Heughan and Graham McTavish as they travel across Scotland and discover their heritage. It premiered on February 14, 2021, on Starz.

A second season, exploring New Zealand and its connections to Scotland, was announced in November 2021. It premiered on August 10, 2023.

== Plot ==
Sam Heughan and Graham McTavish travel in a camper van, heading on a road-trip in search of their complex and rich heritage.

== Episodes ==
=== Series overview ===
| Season | Episodes | Originally released | |
| Season | Episodes | First released | Last released |
|---|---|---|---|
| 1 | 8 | February 14, 2021 | April 11, 2021 |
| 2 | 4 | August 11, 2023 | September 1, 2023 |

=== Season 1 (2021) ===
| No. overall | No. in season | Title | Directed by | Original release date | U.S. viewers (millions) |
|---|---|---|---|---|---|
| 1 | 1 | "Food & Dillon" | Kevin Scott Johnston | February 14, 2021 | 0.322 |
| 2 | 2 | "Scottish Sports" | Kevin Scott Johnston | February 21, 2021 | 0.137 |
| 3 | 3 | "Song & Dance" | Kevin Scott Johnston | February 28, 2021 | 0.146 |
| 4 | 4 | "Witchcraft & Superstition" | Kevin Scott Johnston | March 7, 2021 | 0.157 |
| 5 | 5 | "Tradition" | Kevin Scott Johnston | March 14, 2021 | 0.151 |
| 6 | 6 | "Scotland By Land, Air and Sea" | Kevin Scott Johnston | March 28, 2021 | 0.146 |
| 7 | 7 | "Clans & Tartans" | Kevin Scott Johnston | April 4, 2021 | 0.135 |
| 8 | 8 | "Battle of Culloden" | Kevin Scott Johnston | April 11, 2021 | 0.105 |

=== Season 2 (2023) ===
| No. overall | No. in season | Title | Directed by | Original release date | U.S. viewers (millions) |
|---|---|---|---|---|---|
| 9 | 1 | "Adrenaline County" | Kevin Scott Johnston | August 11, 2023 | N/A |
| 10 | 2 | "Māori Culture" | Kevin Scott Johnston | August 18, 2023 | N/A |
| 11 | 3 | "Taste of New Zealand" | Kevin Scott Johnston | August 25, 2023 | N/A |
| 12 | 4 | "Last Call" | Kevin Scott Johnston | September 1, 2023 | N/A |

== Production ==
In June 2020, it was announced Sam Heughan and Graham McTavish would star in and executive-produce a documentary travel-series, with Sony Pictures Television and Boardwalk Pictures producing, with Starz set to distribute.

== Reception ==
=== Critical reception ===
On Rotten Tomatoes, season 1 holds an approval rating of 100% based on 8 reviews, with an average rating of 7.8/10. On Metacritic, the season holds a rating of 82 out of 100 based on 4 critics, indicating "universal acclaim".
