= Kalaya (restaurant) =

Thai restaurant in Philadelphia, Pennsylvania, U.S.

- Interactive map of Kalaya

Restaurant information
- Established: November 2022
- Owner: Chutatip "Nok" Suntaranon
- Head chef: Chutatip "Nok" Suntaranon
- Food type: Southern Thai
- Location: 4 W Palmer Street, Philadelphia, Pennsylvania, 19125, United States
- Coordinates: 39°58′32″N 75°07′59″W
- Website: kalayaphilly.com

Kalaya, also known as Kalaya Thai Kitchen, is a Southern Thai restaurant in Philadelphia, Pennsylvania owned by Chutatip "Nok" Suntaranon. Established in 2019, Kalaya moved to its current location in November 2022 in Fishtown.

== History ==
Kalaya was included in The New York Times's 2023 list of the 50 best restaurants in the United States, and won the James Beard Award for Best Chef: Mid-Atlantic. The restaurant is named after Nok's mother, Kalaya (Thai: กัลยา), whose name in Thai translates to "beautiful woman". In 2026, Kalaya won the James Beard Award for outstanding restaurant.

== See also ==
- List of Thai restaurants
