= Gaggan =

Restaurant in Thailand

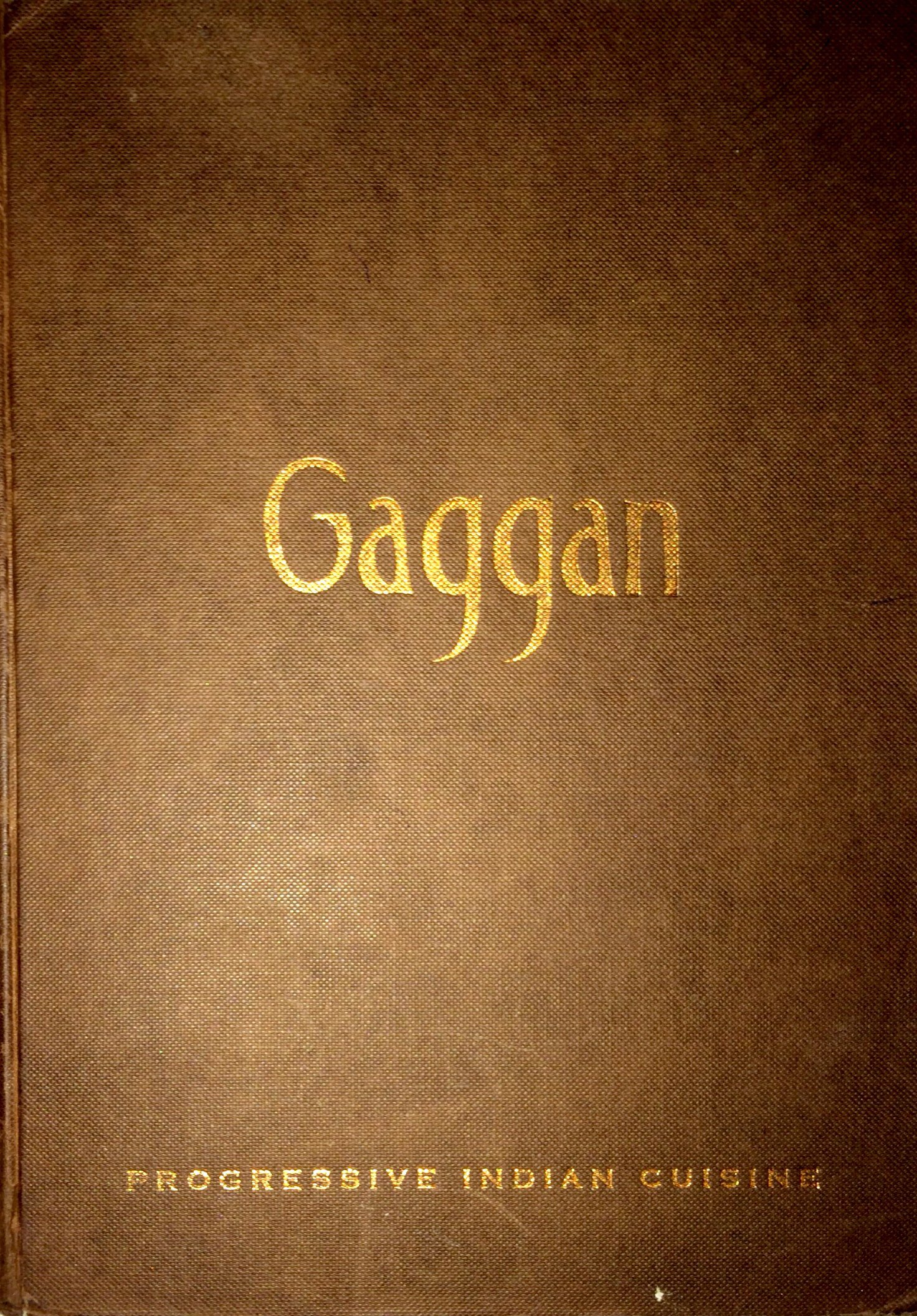
- Interactive map of Gaggan

Restaurant information
- Established: 2010
- Chef: Gaggan Anand
- Food type: Indian / molecular gastronomy
- Rating: (Michelin Guide), best restaurant in Thailand from 2015 to 2018, 4th best in the world in 2019, 2nd best in the world in 2016.
- Location: 68/1 Soi Langsuan, Ploenchit Road, Bangkok, 10330, Thailand
- Coordinates: 13°44′04.7″N 100°32′24.6″E
- Reservations: Yes

Gaggan is a restaurant in Bangkok, Thailand. It ranked number three among Asia's 50 Best Restaurants in 2025 and second at the The World's 50 Best Restaurants 2026 list, previously ranked seventh overall from 2015 to 2018. The restaurant also earned two Michelin stars in the first edition of the Thailand Michelin Guide.

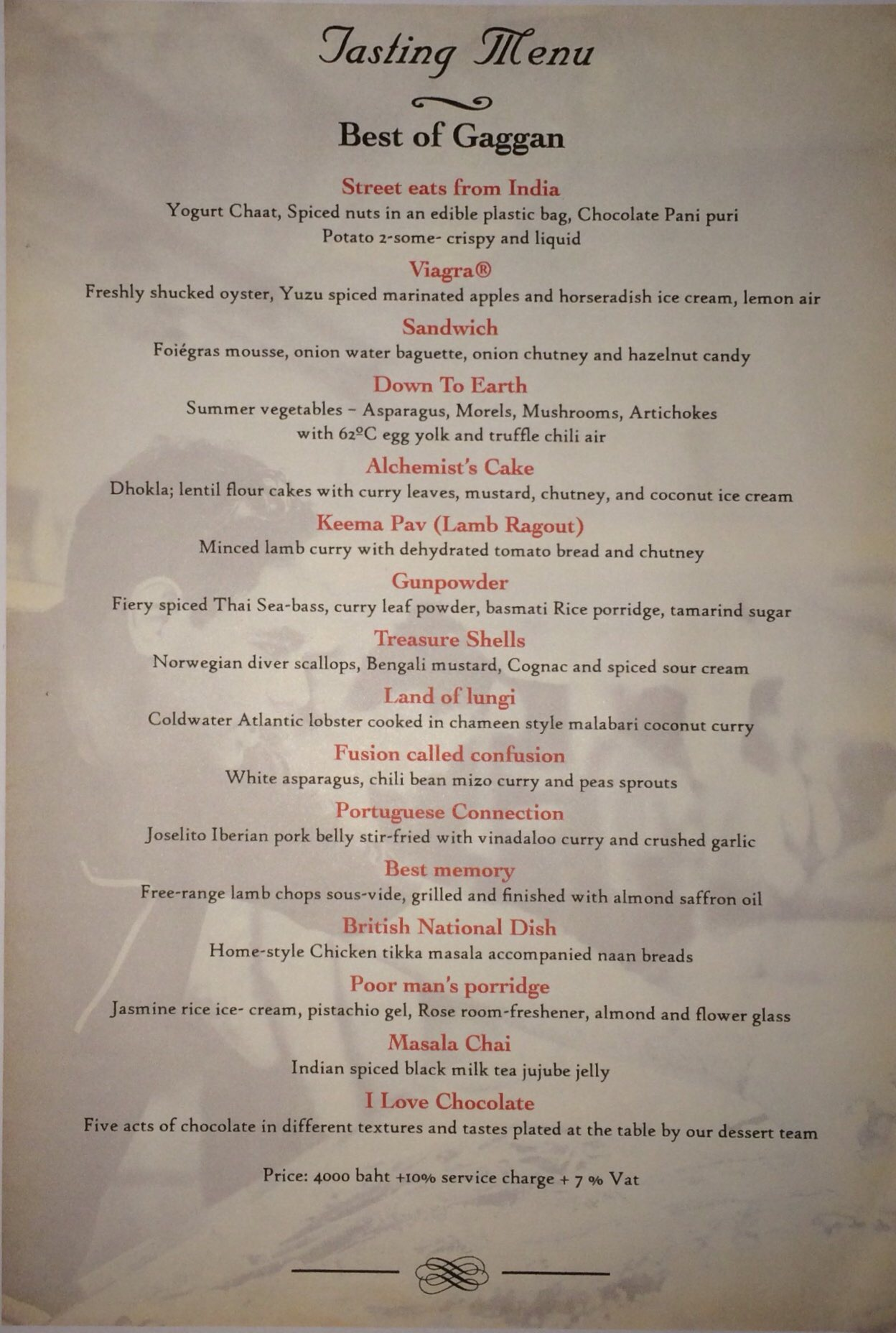
A tasting menu, "Best of Gaggan", in 2015

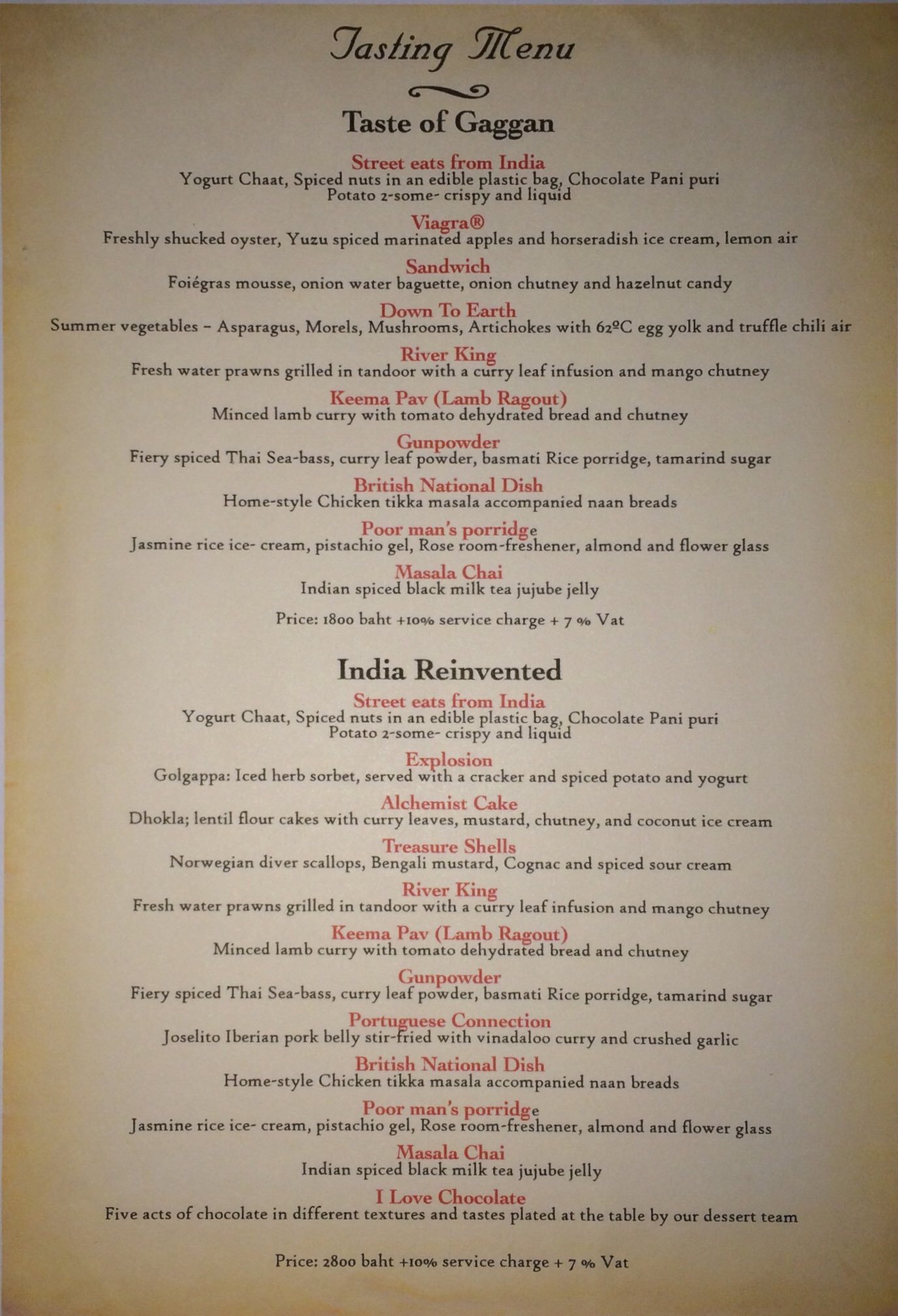
Tasting menus "taste of Gaggan" and "India reinvented" in 2015

== History ==
Gaggan Anand lived in Bangkok from 1996, and wanted to bring Indian food to Thailand, with the same standard of fine dining offered by cuisines from other countries like France and Japan. In 2010, Anand opened Gaggan in a 19th-century townhouse renovated to accommodate the restaurant. While the property underwent renovation, the 2010 Thai political protests were also taking place, which prevented Anand from visiting the restaurant for a significant time.

== Description ==
Gaggan's interior decorations featured a white and beige color scheme with neon purple lights and scattered cushions in various colors. The restaurant's dining area spread across two floors, with some guests dining in small, enclosed rooms.

=== Fare ===
Before opening Gaggan, Anand worked at El Bulli in Spain, a Michelin 3-star restaurant associated with molecular gastronomy. This experience influenced Gaggan's menu, which included dishes such as a coriander foam served with green peppercorn chicken kebabs entitled "Green with Envy," and another entitled "Beauty and the Beast" featuring fig-stuffed potatoes. His signature dish, "Lick it Up", was a mix of different curries placed on a plate that the diner had to lick.

Gaggan also presented a 25-course tasting menu made up of emojis instead of words, which Anand described as "a way to transcend language barriers."

=== Closure ===
Anand initially planned to close Gaggan in June 2020 to start a new venture in Fukuoka, Japan, with his partner Takeshi Fukuyama. However, due to complications with shareholders, the restaurant closed on August 24, 2019. Anand also declared his plan to open a new restaurant in Bangkok by October 2019, with his daughter as the largest shareholder. Gaggan reopened several months after its closure as Gaggan Anand. In 2024, the restaurant restored its original name, Gaggan.

== Reception ==
From 2015 to 2018, Restaurant magazine named Gaggan Thailand's best restaurant as well as one of Asia's best restaurants. This was an improvement when compared to 2014 when the restaurant was rated third overall in Asia. Gaggan placed tenth in The World's 50 Best Restaurants in 2015 and reached number five in 2018. In 2019, the restaurant was voted the fourth best in the world. Gaggan was the only Indian restaurant ever to rank in the top 50 worldwide.
