= Baegyangsa =

Buddhist temple in South Jeolla, South Korea

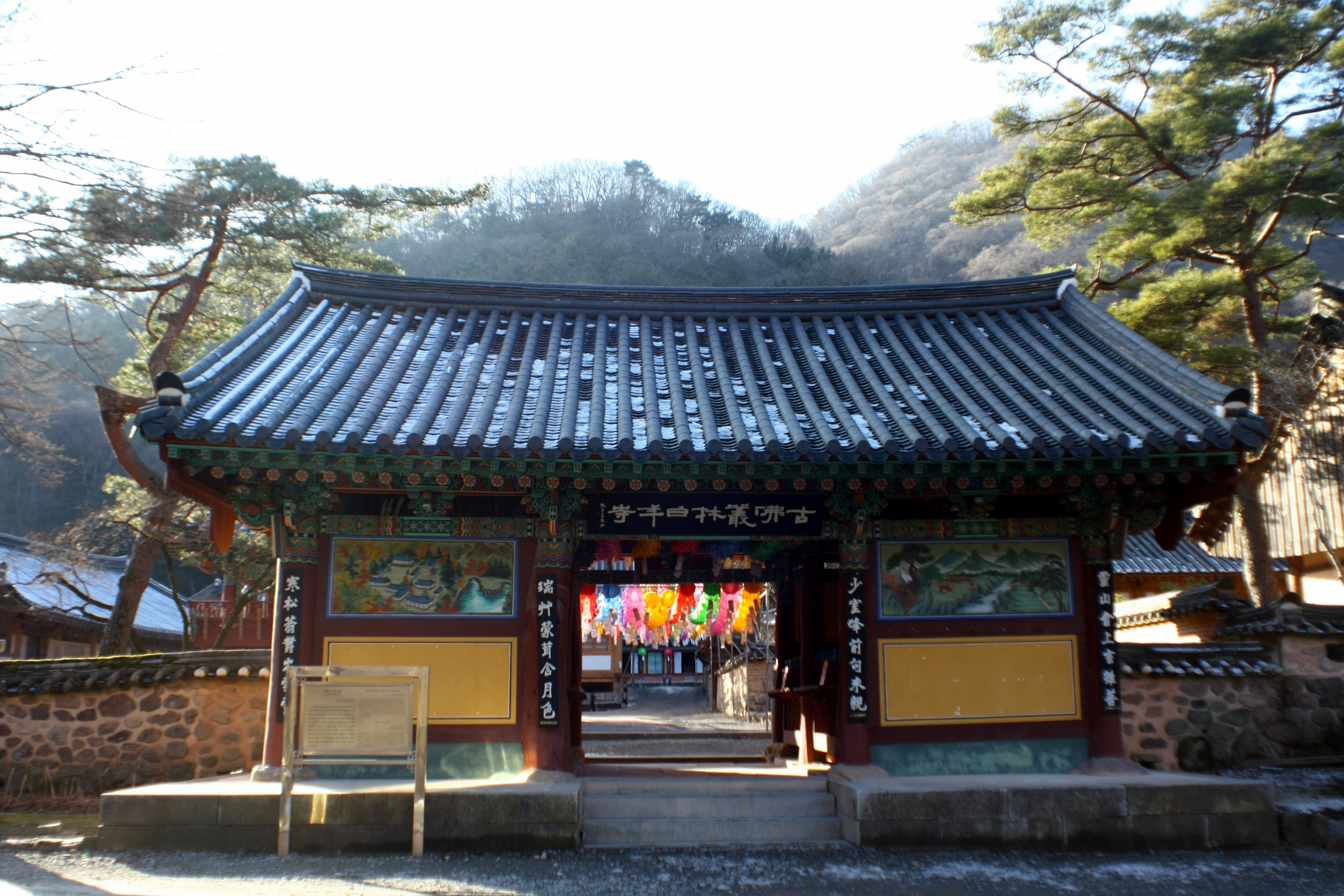

Religion
- Affiliation: Jogye Order, Korean Buddhism

Location
- Interactive map of Baegyangsa
- Coordinates: 35.4392°N 126.8830°E

Korean name
- Hangul: 백양사
- Hanja: 白羊寺
- RR: Baegyangsa
- MR: Paegyangsa

Baegyangsa (Korean: 백양사), also spelled Baekyangsa, is a head temple of the Jogye Order of Korean Buddhism. It is situated in Bukha-myeon, Jangseong County, in South Jeolla province, South Korea. Built in 632 under the Baekje kingdom, it lies on the slopes of Baegam-san in Naejangsan National Park.

== History ==
Baegyangsa was established by Zen Master Yeohwan (여환선사; 如幻禪師) in 632 AD. The temple's original name was Baegamsa (백암사; 白巖寺). In the Goryeo Dynasty, it was renamed Jeongtosa (정토사; 淨土寺) in 1034 by the monk Jungyeon (중연; 中延), who spearheaded a reconstruction of the temple. In Korean, Jeongto is the same concept of heaven as in Christianity. After the mid-Joseon period, this temple got its name as Baegyangsa. This is because in 1574, during the reign of King Seonjo, a monk noticed that whenever he did his daily recital of the Lotus Sutra, many white goat would gather around him. Therefore, he adopted his Buddhist name as Hwanyang (환양; 喚羊), meaning 'calling goat', and gave Jeongtosa a second name, Baegyangsa, meaning 'white goat temple'. Both names would be used until the latter half of the 19th century when Baegyangsa became the sole name.

In the Japanese occupation era the temple was recognized as one of the main temples in the Korean peninsula. It belongs to the Chogye Order at the present time. These days, a large role has been given to Baegyang Temple for educating monks around Jeolla province.

The temple has recently become well-known as the home of monk and chef Jeong Kwan.

== Forests ==
Large numbers of Torreya nucifera grow around Baegyang Temple. This area is one of the northernmost areas where Torreya nucifera can grow in the Korean peninsula.

== Tourism ==
The temple is a notable tourist destination, offering a Temple Stay program. The Temple Stay offers a shorter program and an overnight program, in which participants can learn cooking with Jeong Kwan.

== Transportation ==
Baegyangsa is serviced by intercity buses, with several buses per day to the main bus terminals in Jeongeup and Gwangju.

== See also ==
- Jeong Kwan
- Buddhist temples in South Korea
- Religion in South Korea
