= Yaxcabá Municipality =

Yaxcabá
- Municipality
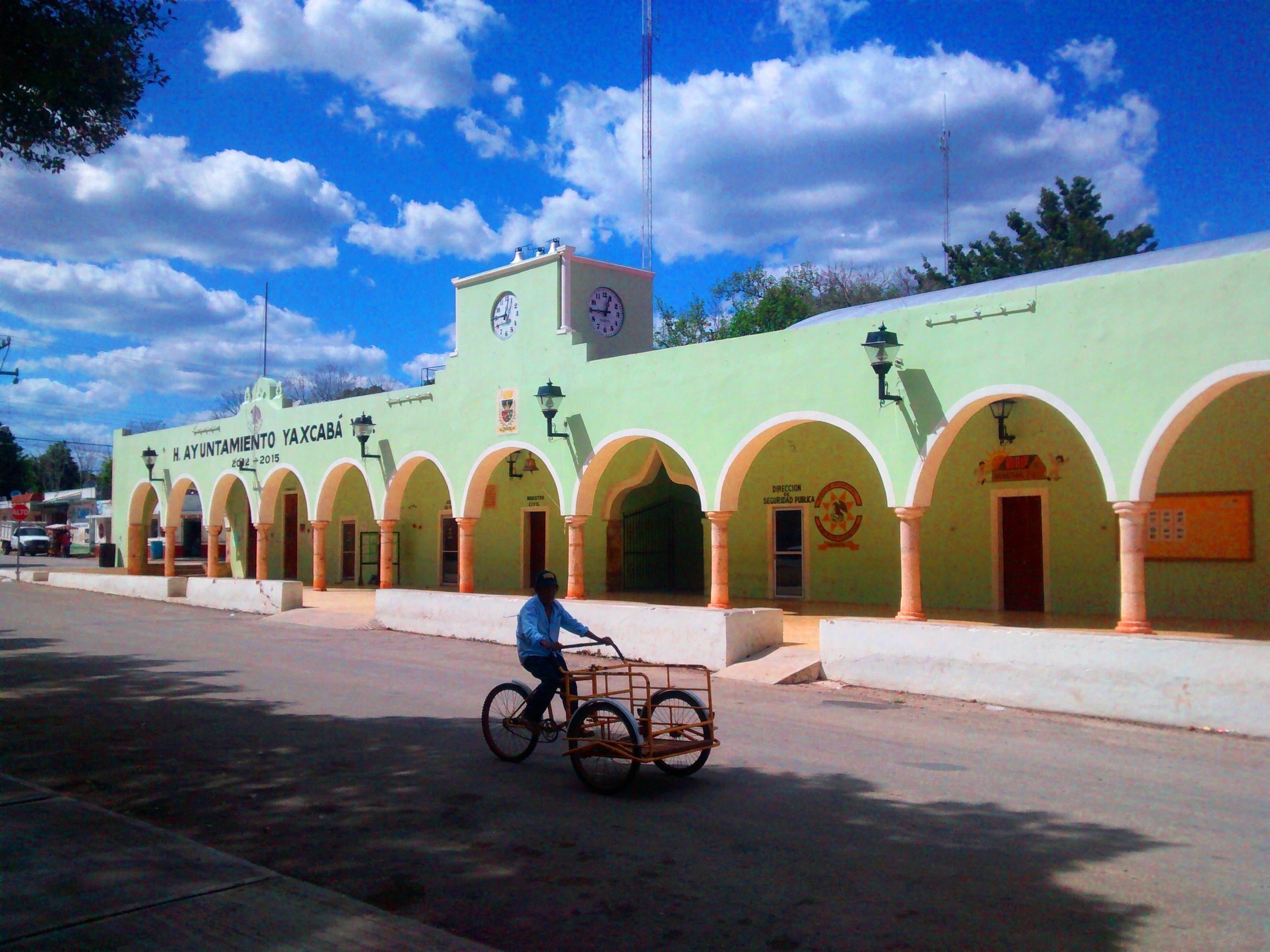
- Municipal Palace

- Location of the Municipality in Mexico
- Coordinates: 20°04′N 89°02′W
- Country: Mexico
- State: Yucatán
- Mexico Ind.: 1821
- Yucatan Est.: 1824
- Municipality Est.: 1923

Government
  - Municipal President: Genri Alberto Pacab Herrera ( PAN 2024–2027)

Area
  - Total: 1,079 km^{2} (417 sq mi)
- Elevation: 27 m (89 ft)

Population (2010)
  - Total: 14,802
- Time zone: UTC-6 (Central Standard Time)
- INEGI Code: 104

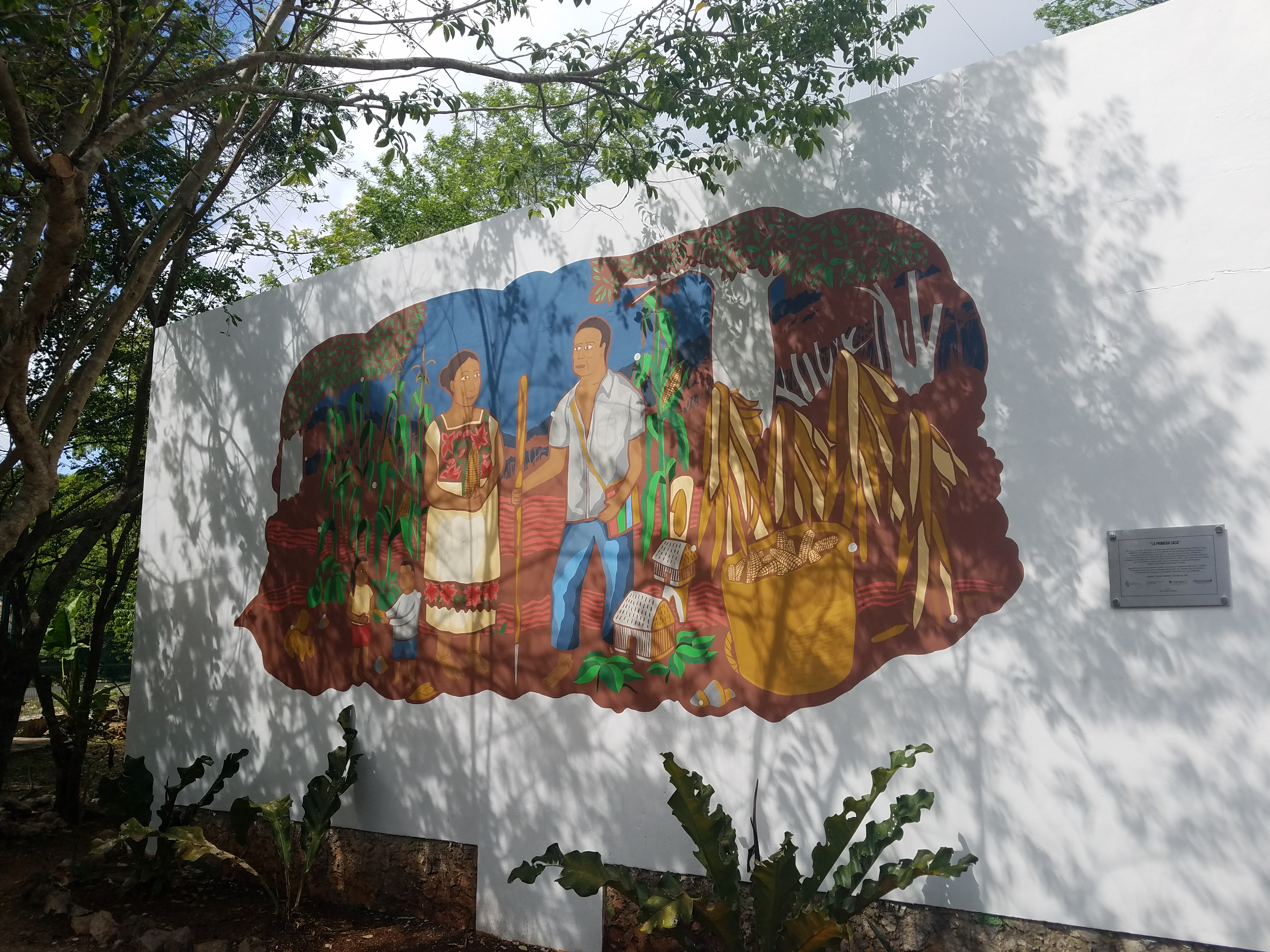
A mural on the community center in Yaxcabá depicting a Mayan family and milpa

Yaxcabá (Spanish pronunciation: [ɟʝaʃkaˈβa]; from Yucatec Maya for 'place of green earth') is a municipality in the Mexican state of Yucatán containing 1079 km^{2} of land and located roughly 80 km southeast of the city of Mérida.

== History ==
The town is believed to have been founded by the Cocom who survived the destruction of Mayapan, in 1441. After the conquest the area became part of the encomienda system. The encomienda was established in 1549 for Martín de Luguízamo and was assigned in 1562 to Joaquín de Luguízamo. Juan Jiménez de Tejeda took over the encomienda in 1607 and in 1622, Gregorio de Cetina became encomendero, leaving the property in 1688 to Diego de Cetina. In 1693 the trust was the responsibility of Cristóbal Maldonado Jurado and a minor Fernando Maldonado. Andrés de Valdés later served as encomendero.

Yucatán declared its independence from the Spanish Crown in 1821. On 8 September 1848, a group of Indians under the leadership of Cecilio Chí captured the town during the Caste War of Yucatán. Coronel Eulogio Rosado who was stationed in Mérida retook the village on the orders of the government.

In 1923, Yaxcabá was designated as its own municipality.

== Governance ==
The municipal president is elected for a three-year term. The town council has nine councilpersons, who serve as Secretary and councilors of education, security and roads, agriculture and policing, public lighting, legalities, cemeteries, health, and sports.

== Communities ==
The head of the municipality is Yaxcabá, Yucatán. There are 66 different communities in the municipality, including Abán, Acapulco, Balam, Canakon, Cenote, Chanciteen, Chich, Chimay, Cholul, Chunchucmil, Cola Blanca, Huchin, Kankabzonot, Libre Unión, Miguel Hidalgo, Nicteil, Oxulá, Paraíso, Popola, Quintana Roo, Sacnité, Sahcabá, San Arturo, San Francisco, San Isidro, San José, San José I, San Juan de los Itzá, San Manuel, San Marcos, San Pedro, San Tomás, Santa Amelia, Santa Eugenia, Santa María, Santa Rita, Santa Rosa, Santo Domingo, Sipché, Tahdzibichén, Teelhú, Tiholop, Tinucáh, Tixcacaltuyub, Tzupich, Tzutzuyub, Xabitita, Xanlá, Xíat, Xinchil, Xlapák, X-ochil, Xolobitancia, X-tosil, Xuul, Yokdzonot, Yoxunah. The significant populations are shown below:

Community	Population
Entire Municipality (2010)	14,802
Canakom	412 in 2005
Kancabdzonot	931 in 2005
Libre Unión	1739 in 2005
Santa María	225 in 2005
Tahdzibichen	1567 in 2005
Tiholop	1333 in 2005
Tixcacaltuyub	1899 in 2005
Yaxcabá	2799 in 2005
Yaxunah	590 in 2005
Yokdzonot	816 in 2005

== Local festivals ==
Each year in April is a fiesta held for the Holy Cross. From 20 to 29 June the town hosts a celebration in honor St. Peter and St. Paul and from 1 to 5 October there is a festival in honor of St. Francis of Assisi.

== Landmarks ==
=== Architectural ===
- Church of St. Francis of Assisi from the colonial era
- Chapel of the Virgin of Guadalupe from the colonial era.
- Church of Santa Cruz
- Former convent and Church of St. Peter
- Chapel of St. Nicholas

=== Archaeological ===
- Libre unión Yaxunáh, Ixpanioh, Xucul, Yokdzonot, Xcanyá, Tixcacaltuyub and Yanláh.
