= Pizzeria Bianco =

Phoenix, Arizona pizza restaurant

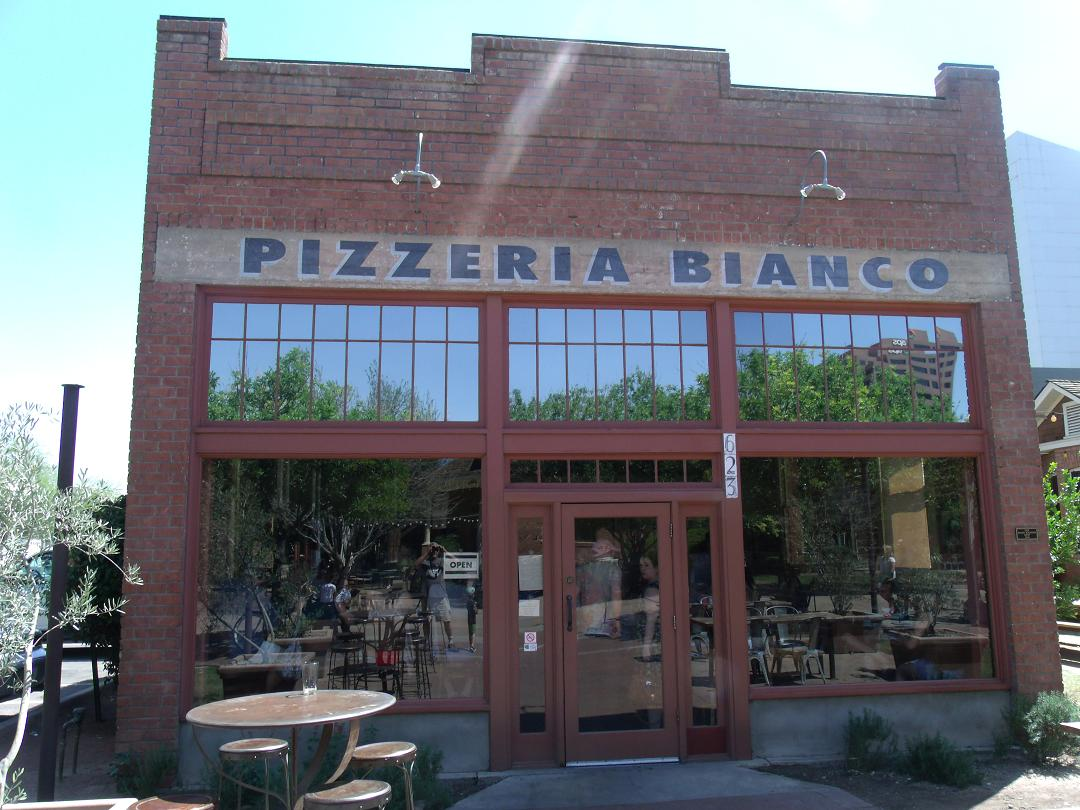
- Exterior of Pizzeria Bianco
- Interactive map of Pizzeria Bianco

Restaurant information
- Established: 1987
- Owner: Chris Bianco
- Head chef: Chris Bianco
- Food type: Pizza
- Location: 623 East Adams Street, Phoenix, Arizona, 85004, United States
- Coordinates: 33.44921°N 112.06564°W
- Seating capacity: 42 seats
- Reservations: for parties of 6—10 only
- Website: pizzeriabianco.com

Pizzeria Bianco is a pizza restaurant in downtown Phoenix, Arizona, established in 1987 by Chris Bianco. It has earned positive reviews from notable food critics. Nationally recognized for its pizzas, the restaurant's small seating capacity can lead to wait times that sometimes surprise casual patrons. The restaurant features a wood-fired oven and homemade mozzarella cheese used in pizzas primarily fashioned by the owner himself. In 2013, the restaurant established a second location in the Biltmore Area of Phoenix. In 2022, the restaurant opened a third location, in Los Angeles.

== History ==
The restaurant was originally opened by Chris Bianco in 1987, in a grocery store which is now AJ's Euro-Market & Deli located in central Phoenix. He moved locations once before Pizzeria Bianco found its home in downtown's Heritage Square in 1996.

Bianco was born in the Bronx, and grew up in Ossining, New York. He had asthma as a child, forcing him to stay inside, where he watched his aunt cook. At age 13 he began working at a local pizzeria. In 1985, he won two plane tickets anywhere in the United States and, on a whim, chose to go to Phoenix. When he got there, he felt connected to the place, and stayed. He began making mozzarella in his apartment and selling it to Italian restaurants. Later, Guy Coscos, a specialty grocer in Phoenix, offered him the opportunity to make and sell pizzas in the corner of his store. Bianco's pizza was popular and he realized he could make pizza for a living. He went to Italy in 1993 to improve his pizzamaking. In 1994, he returned to open Pizzeria Bianco at Town & Country Shopping Center in Phoenix. In 1996, the restaurant moved to 623 East Adams Street, the historic site of Baird Machine Shop in Heritage Square. Bianco also operates Bar Bianco, located next door to the pizzeria in Heritage Square, and Pane Bianco, located in Midtown Phoenix.

Bianco cites Alice Waters, Suzanne Goin at Lucques, Mark Ladner at Del Posto, and Mario Batali as chefs who have inspired him.

== Pizza ==
Bianco described his pizza to Ed Levine in The New York Times, “There’s no mystery to my pizza. Sicilian oregano, organic flour, San Marzano tomatoes, purified water, mozzarella I learned to make at Mike’s Deli in the Bronx, sea salt, fresh yeast cake, and a little bit of yesterday’s dough. In the end great pizza, like anything else, is all about balance. It’s that simple.”

The menu is short, generally consisting of two appetizers, three salads, and six pizzas. Pizzeria Bianco uses a wood-burning oven. Since opening, Chris Bianco has made nearly every pizza himself, sometimes making 250 a night. He and his staff make the mozzarella fresh each morning. Bianco's dough is made by hand, and ideally he lets it ferment for 18 hours. The herbs are from a garden beside the restaurant. The vegetables are from the local farmer's market. In January 2010, Bianco announced that he was taking some time away from pizza making for health reasons (the wood oven and flour in the air were aggravating his asthma). However, Chris Bianco's brother Marco will continue to make the dough and for the time being Horacio Hernandez, Bianco's assistant for 15 years, will cook the pizzas.

== Seating ==
Pizzeria Bianco is a small establishment, with a maximum seating capacity of 42. The pizzeria only takes reservations for parties of 6–10. All other patrons are seated on a first-come, first-served basis, resulting in long lines and waits commonly up to four hours, which can frustrate newcomers. Chris Bianco has said, “it is ridiculous that it’s four hours, but it’s 23 hours to fly to Australia,” saying that some good things "just take a long time." Patrons often line up starting at 3:30 pm, an hour and a half before opening time. There is no take-out or delivery.

== Reviews ==
Pizzeria Bianco has been rated as the best pizza in the United States by Bon Appétit, Vogue, Rachael Ray, and Andrew Zimmern, and has also been recognized by Martha Stewart, Oprah Winfrey, GQ, and Gourmet In 2003, Chris Bianco won the James Beard Foundation Award for best Southwest Chef (the only pizza chef to have won a regional award) and the restaurant received a nearly perfect Zagat score of 29 in 2000. Pizzeria Bianco was featured in Peter Reinhart's book American Pie: My Search for the Perfect Pizza.
