= Gaggan Anand =

Indian chef

- Born: Kolkata, India
- Education: Institute of Hotel Management and Catering Technology Thiruvananthapuram
- Culinary career
- Cooking style: Progressive Indian cuisine
- Current restaurants
- Gaggan Anand (Sukhomvit, Bkk, Thailand)
- Website: gaggananand.com

Gaggan Anand (born in Kolkata, India) is an Indian chef and the owner and executive chef of the progressive Indian restaurant Gaggan in Bangkok, Thailand.

== Biography ==
Anand was born in Kolkata, India to Punjabi parents. He was initially more interested in music than cooking and performed as a drummer in local rock bands before beginning his culinary career.

His primary schooling was in Highins and senior school was St. Thomas Boys School in Kidderpore, Kolkata. He attended a catering college (IHMCT Kovalam) (Indian Institute of Hotel Management and Catering Technology) in Trivandrum and after receiving a diploma he began working as a trainee with the Taj Group. Anand later left the Taj Group to pursue a career catering in Kolkata and ran a home delivery service from Tollygunge area. He later moved to Bangkok, where he began working at Red, a restaurant that specialized in contemporary Indian cuisine. From there he served as the first chef of Indian descent to intern with Ferran Adrià's research team at elBulli and also began working at various restaurants in Bangkok, a process that Anand stated was frustrating because the businesses "just didn't want anything different". This frustration led him to propose to some friends that he open his own restaurant, Gaggan.

== Gaggan ==
Anand opened Gaggan in December 2010. Since then the restaurant has repeatedly placed on the Restaurant's The World's 50 Best Restaurants list. In 2014 it ranked 17th in the global rankings. In 2015, 2016 and 2017, the restaurant was named both the best restaurant in Thailand, and Asia's best restaurant on the list of Asia's 50 Best Restaurants as reported by Restaurant magazine. This was an increase from the third spot overall in Asia in 2014. The restaurant placed 10th, 23rd, 7th and 4th overall in the world in The World's 50 Best Restaurants in 2015, 2016, 2017 and 2019 respectively, and was the first Indian restaurant to rank in the top 50.

Anand planned to close Gaggan in 2020 to start a 10-seat restaurant that opened only on weekends in Fukuoka, Japan. This plan was shelved when on July 23, Anand resigned from his eponymous restaurant due to acrimony with his partners.

== Gaggan Anand ==
Anand opened his own separate restaurant in Bangkok named 'Gaggan Anand' on November 1, 2019, after a split with his partners. In 2021, ‘Gaggan Anand’ debuted on ‘Asia’s 50 Best Restaurants’ at No.5, which also earned the restaurant the Highest New Entry Award 2021.

== Other restaurants ==
Anand also has investments in other restaurants in Bangkok. He opened a steakhouse named Meatlicious and partnered with Thomas and Mathias Sühring to open Sühring, a modern German restaurant that placed 13th in the Asia's Best Restaurants as reported by Restaurant magazine.
