= Corrado Assenza =

Italian pastry chef

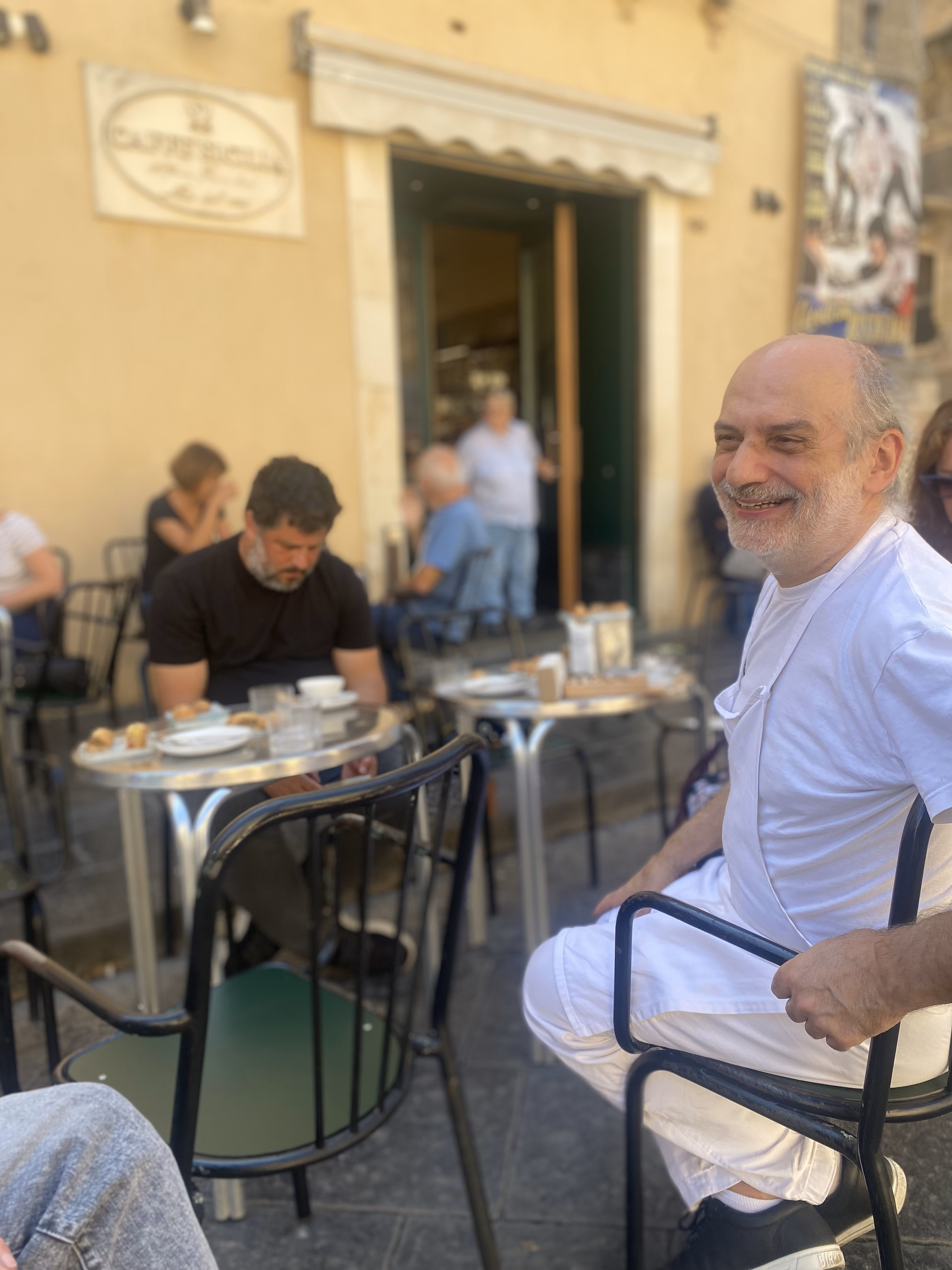
- Assenza sitting outside of his cafe, Caffè Sicilia
- Education: University of Bologna
- Culinary career
- Cooking style: Confectioneries; Sicilian
- Current restaurant: Caffè Sicilia
- Television show: Chef's Table: Pastry
- Website: https://www.caffeitalia.se/

Corrado Assenza is a Sicilian chef. He operates the Caffè Sicilia, presently considered the "sancta sanctorum" (secret holy place) of the ancient confectionery art of Sicily. Assenza was featured in the second episode of Netflix's 4-part series Chef’s Table: Pastry in 2018.

== Early life and career ==
Born in Noto in the early 1960s, Assenza left Sicily after high school to enroll at the Faculty of Agriculture (now the School of Agriculture and Veterinary Medicine) of the University of Bologna. There he met Giorgio Celli, who led him to study entomology and pushed him to specialize in beekeeping. Assenza later received a call from home, however, and, in 1985, before graduating, returned to his hometown to take over the management of his family's pastry shop, Caffè Sicilia.

== Caffè Sicilia ==
Caffè Sicilia, located on Corso Vittorio Emanuele, the main street of Noto, has been the pastry shop of Assenza's family since 1892. Assenza, now the fourth generation in this family, runs the pastry shop with his son Francesco. Since leaving Bologna and returning to his family's pastry shop in Sicily, Assenza has been researching in the shop’s laboratory new processes by which he can bring the intrinsic flavours of both Sicily’s cuisine and some of the world’s to his clients. Each of his products features an expression of contemporary material food culture.

== Style and legacy ==
Assenza's desserts avoid the traditional perfect geometries and lacquered appearance of confectioneries. His aim has been to "bring to life the anarchic beauty" of a piece of fresh fruit or a dash of icing, without form constraints. Lauded by Alain Ducasse as "le plus grande confisieur du monde" (the greatest confectioner in the world), Assenza enhances the aromas of a season in Sicily, explores local and global ingredients, and plays around with culinary dogmas. The creative principle behind his pastries follows a well-thought out less-is-more sensibility. But he is considered a pioneer among Italian chefs, because having had a background in chemistry and biology, he draws inspiration from the grand tradition of Sicilian pasticceria and then comes up with awe-inspiring new flavor combinations by bringing the precision of scientific research to those traditional recipes. In the episode about him in Chef’s Table: Pastry, Assenza's friend and colleague Massimiliano Alajmo said, "Corrado has done so much for Sicily and Italy; it’s incredible. He has no interest in spotlights. He’s never been a prophet at home. He just wants to promote the work of artisans and their ingredients. His knowledge is endless." Assenza also serves a breakfast tasting menu at Caffè Sicilia starting at 10 am.
