= Home Game (TV series) =

2020 documentary television series

- Genre: Documentary; Sport
- Narrated by: Mark Strong
- Country of origin: United States
- Original language: English
- No. of seasons: 1
- No. of episodes: 8

Production
- Executive producers: Ryan Duffy; Austin Reza; Andrew Fried; Dane Lillegard; Jordan Wynn; Matti Leshem; Lou Arbetter
- Running time: 22–36 minutes
- Production company: Boardwalk Pictures

Original release
- Network: Netflix
- Release: June 26, 2020

Home Game is a sports documentary television series. The series profiles unique and dangerous traditional sports from around the world, as well as the communities and cultures where they thrive. The series premiered on Netflix on 26 June 2020 and is narrated by Mark Strong.

== Episodes ==
=== Season 1 ===
No.	Title	Featured sport	Original release date
1	"Calcio Storico"	Calcio Fiorentino	26 June 2020
Rugby meets mixed martial arts in the brutally violent calcio storico, a traditional sport of Florence, Italy, that dates back nearly 500 years.
2	"Highland Games"	Highland games	26 June 2020
Scotland's Highland games combine a cultural celebration with challenging athletic tests of strength - including the unique caber toss.
3	"Freediving"	Freediving	26 June 2020
For many in the Philippines, freediving without oxygen is a way of life. It's also a demanding sport that pushes the limits of the human body
4	"Roller Derby"	Roller Derby	26 June 2020
In Austin, Texas, skaters find an inclusive and supportive community in roller derby, a competition that blends high speed and physical combat.
5	"Kok Boru"	Buzkashi	26 June 2020
In Kyrgyzstan, players throw themselves into the national sport of kok boru, a rough polo-like game played on horses - with a dead goat as the ball.
6	"Catch Fétchie"	Catch Fétiche	26 June 2020
Professional wrestling in the Republic of the Congo mixes athleticism and showmanship, but adds a layer of voodoo mysticism that makes it unlike anything else.
7	"Makepung Lampit"	Makepung Lampit	26 June 2020
Unique to Bali's Jembrana region, Makepung Lampit puts its own spin on drag racing. The vehicle is a water buffalo, the track a flooded rice field.
8	"Pehlwani"	Pehlwani	26 June 2020
Athletes have grappled in Phelwani wrestling contests for centuries in India. Now women are competing in an arena once reserved for men.

== Release ==
Home Game was released on June 26, 2020, on Netflix.
