= Ivan Ramen =

Restaurant in New York City

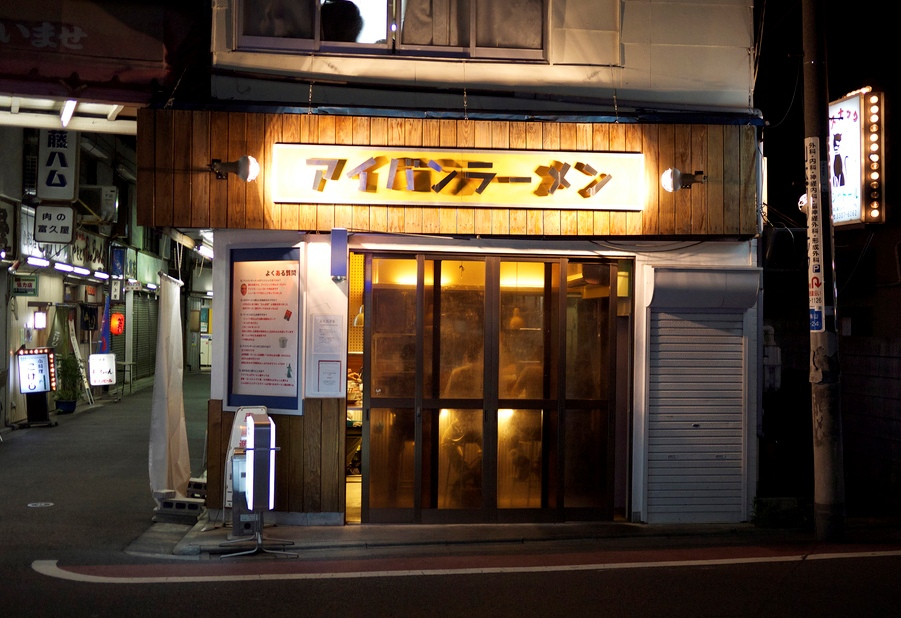
- Setagaya, Tokyo location in 2010
- Interactive map of Ivan Ramen

Restaurant information
- Established: June 2006
- Owner: Ivan Orkin
- Location: 25 Clinton Street, New York, New York, United States
- Coordinates: 40.72055°N 73.98454°W
- Other locations: Las Vegas, Nevada
- Website: www.ivanramen.com

Ivan Ramen is a ramen restaurant in New York City (25 Clinton Street, Lower East Side) which is run by chef Ivan Orkin.

== History ==
Owner Ivan Orkin was born in Syosset, New York, and moved to Japan in the 1980s to teach English after graduating from college. In 1990, he returned to the United States with his Japanese wife, Tami, and attended the Culinary Institute of America from 1991 to 1993. He subsequently worked as a chef in New York at the Mesa Grill and Lutèce. His wife Tami died in 1998, and Orkin met his second wife, Mari, on a subsequent trip to Japan; they moved to Japan together in 2003.

The original Ivan Ramen ramen shop in Setagaya, Tokyo, opened in June 2006. The 10-seat restaurant received early positive reviews and press attention. In 2010, a second location with 16 seats, Ivan Ramen Plus, opened nearby. After moving back to the United States, Ivan Orkin announced the closure of Ivan Ramen in Tokyo in November 2015, handing over the shop to his long time chef and manager, Hisao Matsumoto.

Orkin moved to New York in 2011, opening Ivan Ramen restaurants in Hell's Kitchen and the Lower East Side in 2013. He closed the outlet in Hell's Kitchen in November 2020 because of the COVID-19 pandemic.

== Media ==
Ivan Ramen was featured on an episode of the NHK series Begin Japanology in 2009. A book about the restaurant, Ivan Ramen: Love, Obsession, and Recipes from Tokyo's Most Unlikely Noodle Joint, was published in 2013. Ivan Ramen was featured on an episode of the Netflix series Chef's Table in 2017. Ivan Ramen was featured in Season 3 Episode 10 of Billions.

== See also ==
- List of restaurants in Tokyo
