= Gabriele Bonci =

Italian chef

- Born: Italy
- Occupation: Chef
- Known for: Pizza al taglio

Gabriele Bonci is an Italian chef who specializes in pizza al taglio. He became well known as a television personality in Italy.

== Early life and education ==
Bonci was born to Severina and Sergio. His mother's family were farmers in Agro Pontino. His father's family ran a trattoria in Cupramontana. He became interested in baking after observing his mother leaving dough to rise beneath a radiator when the family left the house to attend church.

Bonci recalls every day on the way home from school he would stop for supplì, fried balls of risotto, and a slice of tomato pizza. He attended catering school.

Bonci attended cooking school against his family's wishes. At sixteen he worked in a trattoria in Abruzzo. At eighteen he worked in London. He returned to Rome and worked at Convivio, which at the time had two Michelin stars.

== Career ==
After graduating from cooking school, Bonci worked at Rome's Simposio restaurant and eventually became chef there.

In 2003 he opened Pizzarium Bonci near Vatican City, called by The Atlantic "Rome's most revered pizza al taglio (pizza by the slice) joint" and by Katie Parla and Kristin Gill, authors of Tasting Rome, "Rome's landmark pizza by the slice joint". He opened a Chicago pizzeria with American partner Rick Tasman in 2017.

He experimented with fried pasta balls similar to the fried balls of risotto he'd grown up eating. He became well known for his pizzamaking and was named "Michelangelo of Pizza" by Vogue. He was invited on a television program, La prova del cuoco. He became a regular. He also served as a judge on reality competition television shows such as Bake Off Italia.

Elisia Menuni developed a logo Bonci used, and Bonci developed a character around it, Bonci. Bonci became a celebrity chef in Italy to the point a jingle, "Bonci, Bonci, bon-bon-bon", was used to introduce him for his appearances. In 2011 he began teaching at Rome's Tricolore cooking school.

According to Matt Goulding, Bonci "set off a small revolution in the Italian baking and pizza world".

The pressure of sustaining the persona caused him to retreat from the public view. As of the early 2020s he says he considers himself not a pizzaiolo ('pizza maker') but a farmer.

Bonci had a television program, Pizza Hero. In each episode, he evaluated the work of three pizza ovens, choosing two to compete for the opportunity to have their stores remodeled. It filmed in cities around Italy.

In 2013 Bonci's Pizza:Seasonal Recipes From Rome's Legendary Pizzarium was published.

In 2017, Bonci opened his first pizzeria outside Italy, in West Loop, Chicago. A second Chicago pizzeria opened in Wicker Park, Chicago, but later shut down. Bonci opened a pizzeria in 2019 in New Orleans, Louisiana; it later closed. In 2021 Bonci opened a pizzeria in Miami, Florida in Wynwood; it later closed. In 2023 the brand opened another location in Chicago, choosing the Lincoln Park neighborhood. By April 2024 the brand had three Chicago locations after opening in the Lake View, neighborhood. In 2026, "Bonci Pizza in teglia" opened in Milano.

== Approach ==
=== Ingredients ===
Bonci focuses on higher-quality ingredients such as flour from Piedmont artisanal producer Mulino Marino. He developed a blend of grains which he calls pane di semper which creates a "light, delicate" crust. He includes whole grains, which produce more flavor, and high-gluten flour, which helps whole-grain flours rise well. Grains he works with include whole wheat, whole grain farro, and spelt. He uses a wild-caught yeast. According to Nancy Harmon Jenkins he incorporates olive oil, which is unusual for pizza dough.

=== Technique ===
Bonci uses breadmaking techniques, such as a long-fermentation method at low temperatures, which encourages the development of complex flavors in the dough. He does not knead.

== Recognition ==
The Atlantic called Bonci "Italy's foremost celebrity baker". The Los Angeles Times called him "Rome's phenomenal pizza master". The Washington Post said, "what do you call him? chef? baker? pizzamaker fanatic? genius?" la Repubblica said that with Stefano Bonilli he had "inaugurated an era". Anthony Bourdain joked that in order to get Bonci's pizza, people should, "Leave your family, abandon your children". Mashed said he'd "reinvented the Roman idea of pizza". Il Sussidiario called him "Italy's greatest baker". Marida Caterini called him "The king of Roman pizza" and said, "Traditionally, food critics call his preparations not pizzas, but actual works of art." They credited him with raising Roman pizza to national importance. Parla and Gill called him a "legendary baker". Goulding called him a "virtuoso". Barbara Caracciolo credited him with making pizza al taglio "internationally respected".

Netflix included him in their Chef's Table documentary series.

== Personal life ==
Bonci describes himself as a "big child. Big and round. Beautifully round". He started to cook at 14 and says that from then on he knew he wanted to cook and never wanted to do anything else. He has said that he became confused between where the dividing line between Gabriele Bonci and the character Bonci was, calling the character his "clown costume" and the jingle "the red nose". In 2022 he describes having to kill the character in order to himself survive. At the time he weighed almost 200 kilograms (440 lb). He decided to have sleeve gastrectomy.
