= Yaxuná =

Maya archeological site in Mexico

Coordinates: 20°27′N 88°40′W

Yaxuna is a Maya archaeological site in the municipality of Yaxcabá in Yucatán, Mexico.

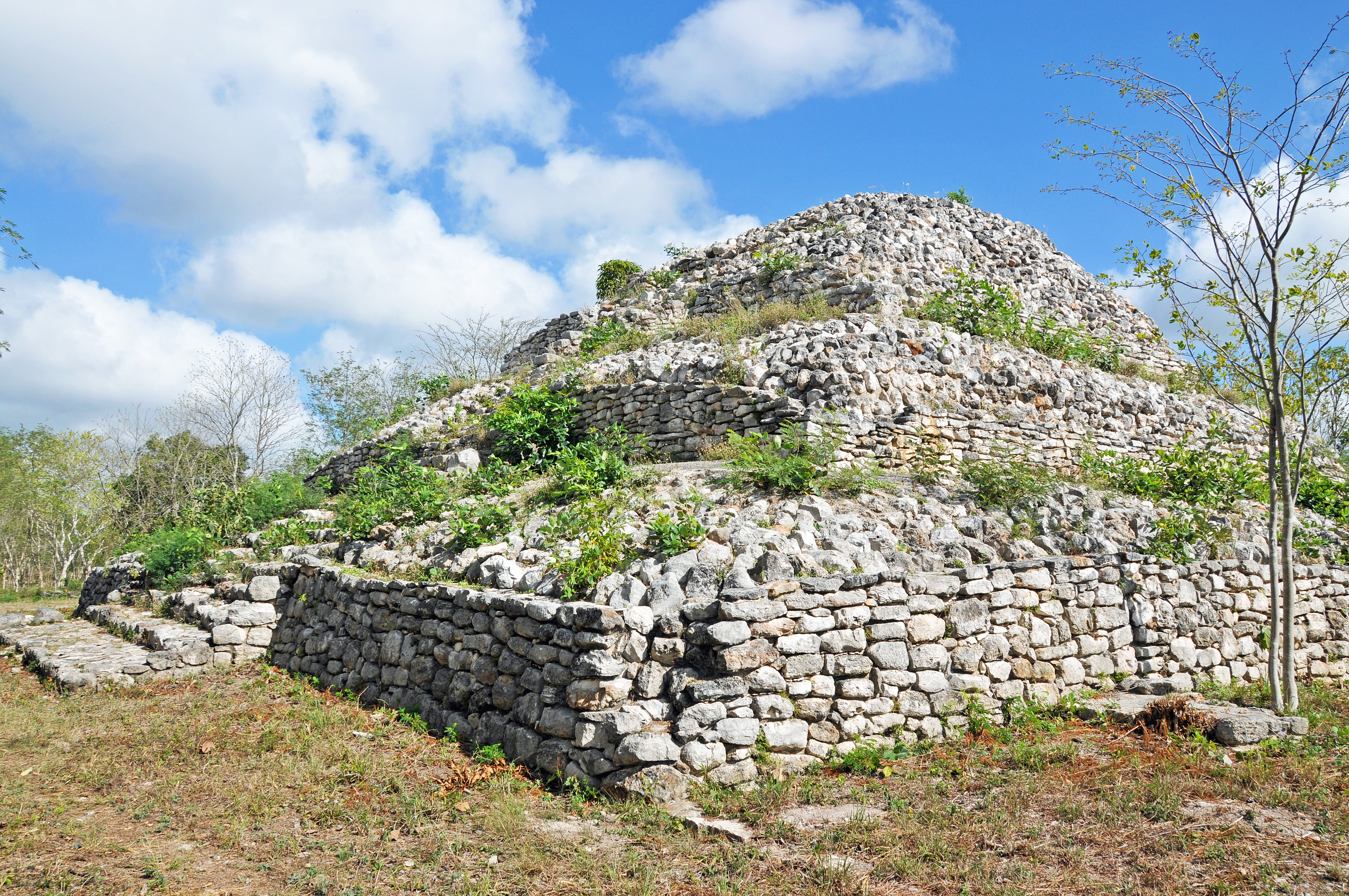
View of Yaxuna archeological site

The settlement had a long continuous occupation running from the Middle Formative Period through the Postclassic. The Late Formative saw the construction of a number of triadic architectural groups linked with roads running north to south. Some of the larger pyramids were remodeled during the Early Classic, and held royal tombs. In the Late Classic (ca. 600–800), the city-state of Coba conquered Yaxuna and built a 100 km Sacbe, or raised road, to connect the two cities. This was the longest the Maya ever built. Internally, new roads running east to west were constructed. In the Terminal Classic (800–1100), the state of Chichén Itzá to the north began a war with the Coba state, and Yaxuna constructed a city wall, but Chichén Itzá appears to have conquered the city by around 950. Sacked and ritually destroyed, the city never recovered. By the Postclassic (1100–1697), the population was much reduced, with new construction limited to minor additions to older architecture.

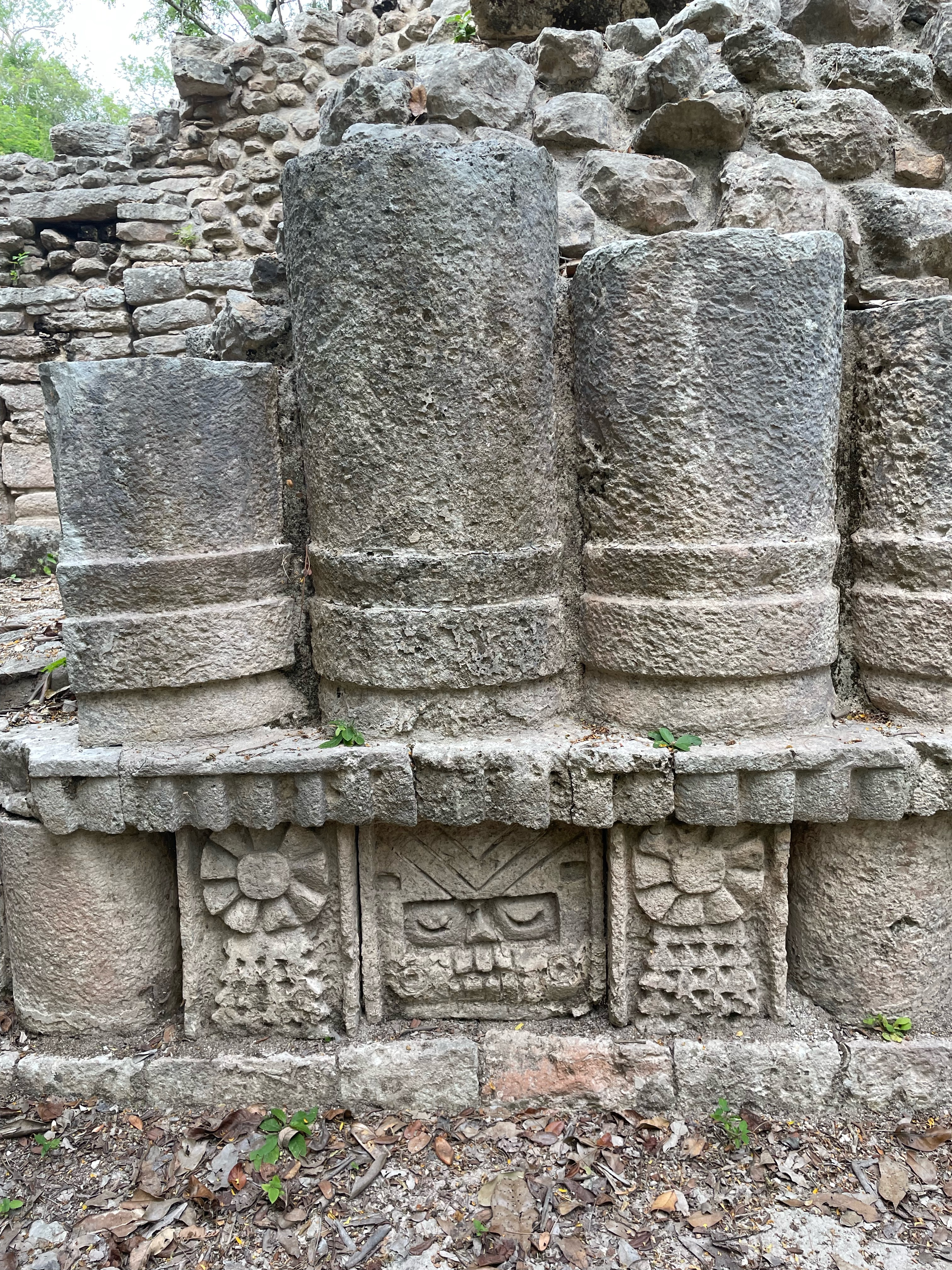
Stone pillars with carvings
