= Rethink Food =

New York based food insecurity non-profit organization

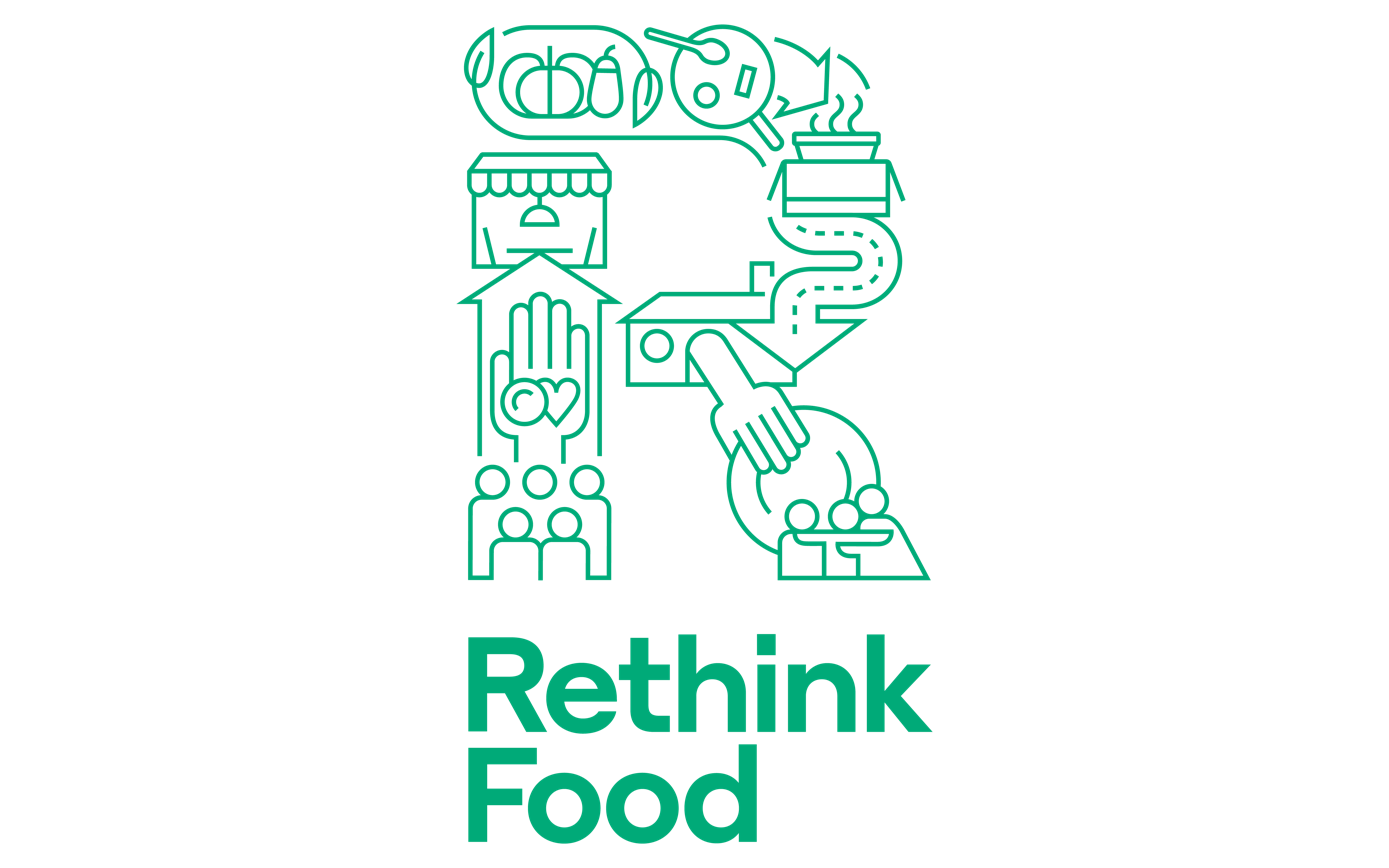
- Founded: 2017
- Type: non-profit organization
- Purpose: To create a more sustainable and equitable food system
- Headquarters: New York City
- Region served: United States; currently active in five cities, including Miami, San Francisco, Chicago, and Nashville
- CEO and founder: Matt Jozwiak
- Key people: Daniel Humm (co-founder)
- Website: www.rethinkfood.org

Rethink Food NYC Inc, commonly called Rethink Food or just Rethink, is a non-profit organization based in New York City. The organization was founded to address hunger in the United States by contributing to a sustainable and equitable food system. Rethink collects excess food from restaurants, grocery stores, and corporate kitchens to provide nutritious meals for people living without food security at low or no-cost. The organization expanded its operations in March 2020 to meet growing food demands amid the COVID-19 pandemic in the United States.

== Leadership ==
Rethink Food was founded by Matt Jozwiak, a chef who got his start washing dishes in Kansas before training under Pierre Orsi in France. He went on to work at Michelin-starred restaurants including Auberge de L’ile Barbe in Lyon and Noma in Copenhagen, as well as The NoMad in New York, before serving as chef de partie at Eleven Madison at age 27. Jozwiak currently serves as CEO, and has been recognized as one of Business Insider's 100 Coolest People in Food, a member of Crains New York 2021 class of 40 under Forty, and a Trailblazing Activist in the 50 Next Class of 2021 pushing for equality, diversity and positive action in gastronomy.

In April 2020, Daniel Humm officially became Rethink's head chef and a founding board member.

== History ==
Rethink Food was founded in 2017, and for the first several years of its operations, the nonprofit was preparing up to 10,000 meals per week, working closely with the Food Bank For New York City to direct meals to area missions.

In 2019, Rethink Food was named a "Top-Rated Nonprofit" by GreatNonprofits.

In March 2020, the organization shifted its operations in order to serve the growing need in response to the COVID-19 pandemic in the United States. As part of Rethink's pandemic response, the organization expanded to a national scope.

In April 2020, Rethink partnered with Eleven Madison Park, a Michelin-starred restaurant, and American Express to reopen the restaurant as a commissary kitchen with the goal of producing 3,000 meals per day for residents of New York and associated healthcare workers impacted by the COVID-19 crisis. As part of the program free meals were delivered to clients of Citymeals-on-Wheels and to hospital workers across the city.

Also in April, Rethink scaled up quickly, and began feeding as many as 10,000 people every 48 hours, averaging a total of 35,000 meals a week. The organization began running a food truck program to deliver 5,000 free meals per day to hospital workers across New York City. Partnering with local commissaries to prepare the meals, Rethink was distributing food at 20 medical facilities via 10 pop-up food trucks.

Rethink Food launched a Restaurant Response Program to fund 30 New York restaurants with grants of up to $40,000 to prepare and distribute meals for underprivileged communities and essential workers. and to keep restaurant workers employed. The Restaurant Response Program allowed the organization to increase meal distribution, as well as help local restaurants pay rent and their respective staff. Program participants include Fieldtrip, Collective Fare and Little Tong Noodle Shop. Between April and October, the program invested $10 million in independent restaurants and provided over two million meals. The Rethink Certified program raised an additional $30 million to invest in restaurants in October 2020.

Rethink launched the Chinatown/LES Food Initiative in April 2020 to help produce and distribute culturally appropriate meals to the residents of Chinatown who were disproportionately impacted by COVID-19. The organization worked with volunteers who went door to door throughout the neighborhood to distribute meals to elderly individuals. Asian restaurants like Zen Yai helped cook the food while the Chinese Conservative Baptist Church (CCBC) served as one of the main distribution points.

In 2020, Rethink also opened Rethink Café, its first donation-based cafe, at 154 Clinton Avenue in Brooklyn. The cafe is a registered soup kitchen run by professional chefs which provides nutritionally complete meals for a suggested donation.

The Smorgasburg market in Brooklyn helped raise funds for Rethink Food on its website in 2021.

In November 2021, Rethink began work in Miami, providing two restaurants in Little Haiti funds to prepare about 1,000 meals per week and distribute them to community-based organizations Sant La Haitian Neighborhood Center and Miami Rescue Mission. Rethink is also launching a partnership with Michael Schwartz's restaurant Michael's Genuine Food & Drink in the Design District.

== Partnerships ==
=== Brookfield Properties and Union Square Hospitality Group ===
In July 2020, Rethink Food announced a $1 million partnership with Brookfield Properties and Union Square Hospitality Group to produce meals for food-insecure families in New York City. The partnership's objective is the reemployment of restaurant team employees and the distribution of 125,000 meals in the South Bronx. Rethink and USHG also launched a mentorship program that allows smaller restaurants to participate.

=== Full Circle Brands ===
In November 2021, Full Circle Brands, a home care product conglomerate, announced a new brand called For Good, a family of sustainable and compostable household staples including cling wrap, parchment paper and trash and zipper bags. Central to the brand is a partnership with Rethink Food; 1% of every purchase goes to creating an equitable and sustainable food system.

=== Gorillas ===
Gorillas, the European on-demand grocery delivery company, began its US operations in New York City in 2021 with a partnership with Rethink Food. Rethink Food is collecting excess food from Gorillas’ expanding network of warehouses citywide to be transformed into nutritious meals at the Rethink Commissary Kitchen for distribution via community-based organizations.

=== Hu ===
Since 2020, Rethink Food has partnered with Hu, a brand of vegan chocolate and snack products acquired by Mondelez International. The partnership supports Rethink's mission by matching purchases of certain product lines with financial donations to the nonprofit, as well as in-kind product donations of the brand's chocolates for distribution to communities.

=== Kvarøy Arctic ===
In 2021, family-owned sustainable salmon farming company Kvarøy Arctic began working with Rethink Food as the first large-scale seafood donation partner for the organization. Kvarøy Arctic has donated monthly shipments of 1,500-2,000 pounds of its salmon for use by Rethink's Commissary Kitchen in preparing an estimated 8,000 community meals per week.

=== Ghetto Gastro ===
In May 2020, Rethink Food partnered with Bronx-based culinary collective Ghetto Gastro to provide free meals to residents of the Bronx, especially low-income families, elderly residents, people of color, and formerly incarcerated people. The Bronx was especially impacted by the pandemic, and at the time had more coronavirus cases than anywhere else in the city. The organizations provided tens of thousands of meals to residents of the Bronx, and also provided meals to Black Lives Matter protesters at Washington Square Park and Domino Park in NYC.

Ghetto Gastro also produced a series of shirts, along with a partnership with Brooklyn artist Aya Brown, to benefit Rethink Food and Rethink Certified community restaurants and to bring attention to racial inequality and lack of access to food in the United States.

== See also ==
- City Harvest (United States)
- Citymeals-on-Wheels
- Feeding America
