= Musée d'Art Moderne de Paris =

Modern art museum in Paris

- Location within Paris
- Established: 1961
- Location: Palais de Tokyo, 11 avenue du Président Wilson, 75016 Paris, France
- Coordinates: 48.864422°N 2.297333°E
- Type: Art museum
- Visitors: 780,078 (2025)
- Director: Fabrice Hergott
- Public transit access: Iéna
- Website: mam.paris.fr

Musée d'Art Moderne de Paris (French pronunciation: [myze daʁ mɔdɛʁn də paʁi], in full the Musée d'Art Moderne de la Ville de Paris, the Museum of Modern Art of the City of Paris) or MAM Paris, is a major municipal museum dedicated to modern and contemporary art of the 20th and 21st centuries, including monumental murals by Raoul Dufy, Gaston Suisse, and Henri Matisse. It is located at 11, Avenue du Président Wilson in the 16th arrondissement of Paris.

The museum is one of the 14 City of Paris' Museums that have been incorporated since 1 January 2013 in the public institution Paris Musées.

== History ==
Located in the eastern wing of the Palais de Tokyo and constructed for the International Exhibition of Arts and Technology of 1937, the museum was inaugurated in 1961.

The museum reopened in October 2019 after a €10 million redesign by h2o architectes.

== Programs ==
The museum collections include about 15,000 works from the art movements of the 20th century. Exhibitions highlight the European and international art scenes of the 20th century, as well as displaying monographic and thematic exhibitions of trends in today's art. Temporary exhibitions run every six weeks.

== Collections ==
The museum's permanent collection includes works by:

Pablo Picasso, Georges Braque, Henri Matisse, Emile Othon Friesz, Wilhelm Lehmbruck, Maurice de Vlaminck, Georges Rouault, Raoul Dufy, Marie Laurencin, Pierre Bonnard, Édouard Vuillard, Albert Marquet, Henri Laurens, Jacques Lipchitz, Jean Metzinger, Albert Gleizes, André Lhote, Juan Gris, Alexander Archipenko, Joseph Csaky, Ossip Zadkine, Marcel Duchamp, Francis Picabia, František Kupka, Robert and Sonia Delaunay, Fernand Léger, Jean Hélion, Auguste Herbin, Joaquín Torres-García, Natalia Gontcharova, Luigi Russolo, Amedeo Modigliani, Giorgio de Chirico, Alberto Magnelli, Gino Severini, Kees van Dongen, Bart van der Leck, Jean Arp, Sophie Taeuber-Arp, Maurice Utrillo, Suzanne Valadon, André Derain, Moïse Kisling, Marcel Gromaire, Marc Chagall, Chaïm Soutine, Leonard Foujita, Alexander Calder, Alberto Giacometti, Jean Crotti, Man Ray, Max Ernst, André Masson, Victor Brauner, Hans Bellmer, Roberto Matta, Wifredo Lam, Jean Fautrier, Jean Dubuffet, Bernard Buffet, Pierre Soulages, Nicolas de Staël, Zao Wou Ki, Pierre Alechinsky, Henri Michaux, Étienne-Martin, Antoni Tàpies, Lucio Fontana, Yves Klein, Arman, Martial Raysse, Jean Tinguely, Christo, Victor Vasarely, François Morellet, Carlos Cruz-Diez, Bridget Riley, Daniel Buren, Nam June Paik, Mario Merz, Giuseppe Penone, Luciano Fabro, Simon Hantaï, Delphine Coindet, Bernard Frize, Jean-Michel Othoniel, Robert Rauschenberg, Keith Haring, John Heartfield, James Lee Byars, Peter Doig, Otto Freundlich, Hannah Höch, Hans Hartung, Gerhard Richter, Georg Baselitz, Sigmar Polke, Jörg Immendorff, Wolf Vostell, Andreas Gursky, Markus Lüpertz, Thomas Schütte, Thomas Ruff, Gisèle Freund, Rosemarie Trockel, Daniel Turner, Albert Oehlen, Per Kirkeby, Marcel Broodthaers, Zeng Fanzhi, Gaston Suisse and others.

== Gallery ==
Jean Metzinger, 1912–1913, L'Oiseau bleu, (The Blue Bird), oil on canvas, 230 x 196 cm

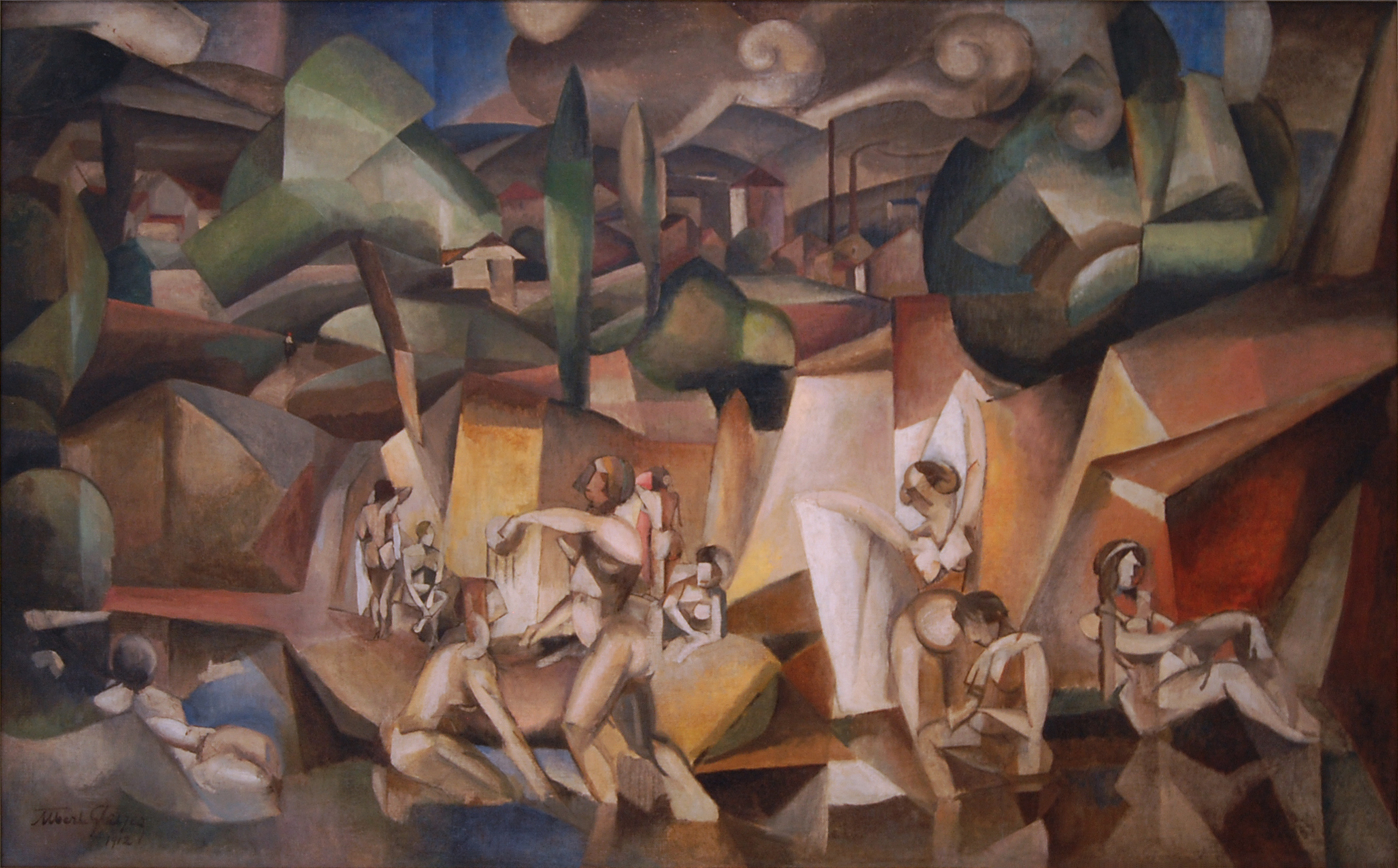
Albert Gleizes, 1912, Les Baigneuses (The Bathers), oil on canvas, 105 x 171 cm

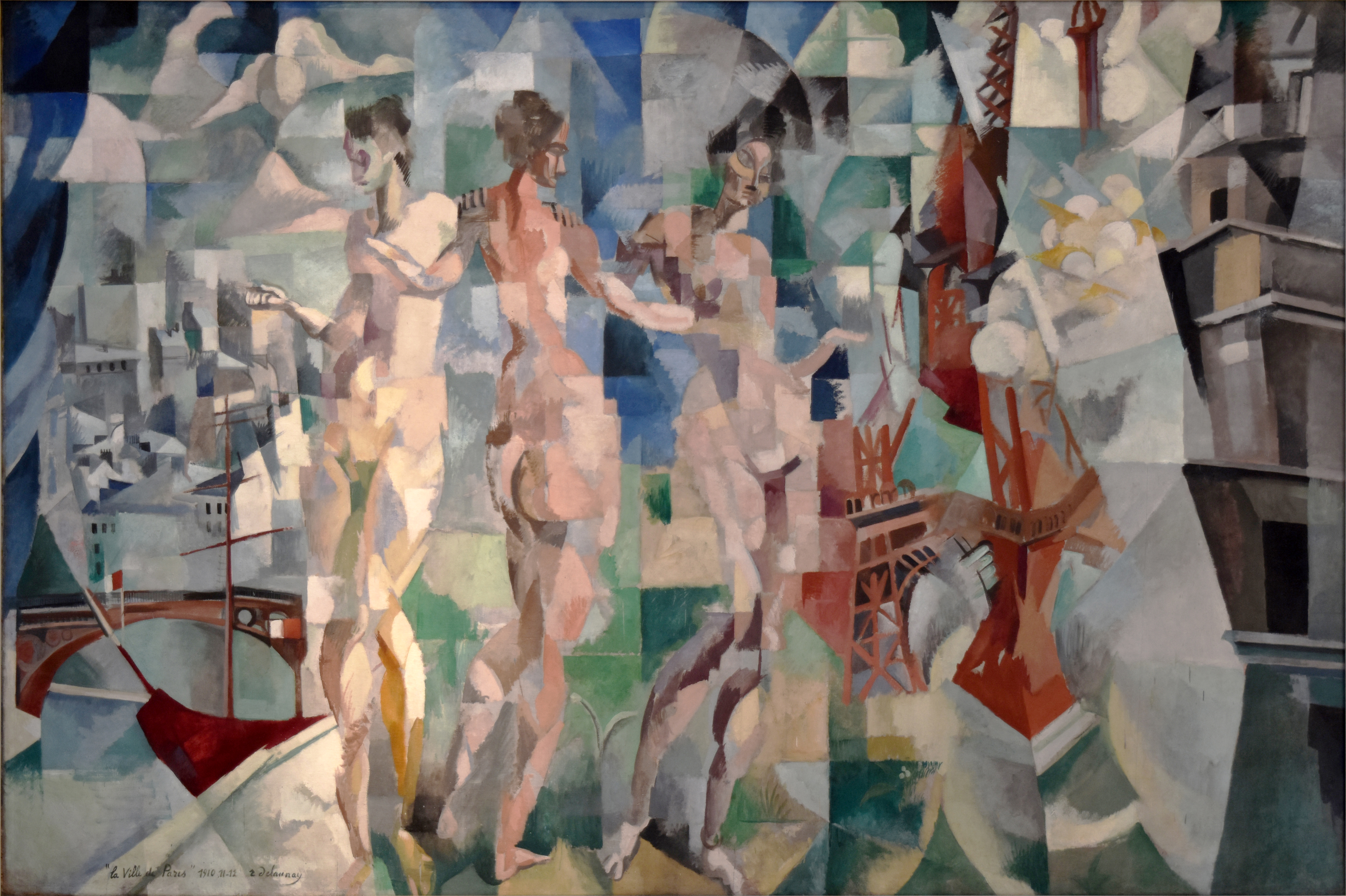
Robert Delaunay, 1912, La Ville de Paris, oil on canvas, 267 × 406 cm

André Lhote, 1913, L'Escale, oil on canvas, 210 x 185 cm

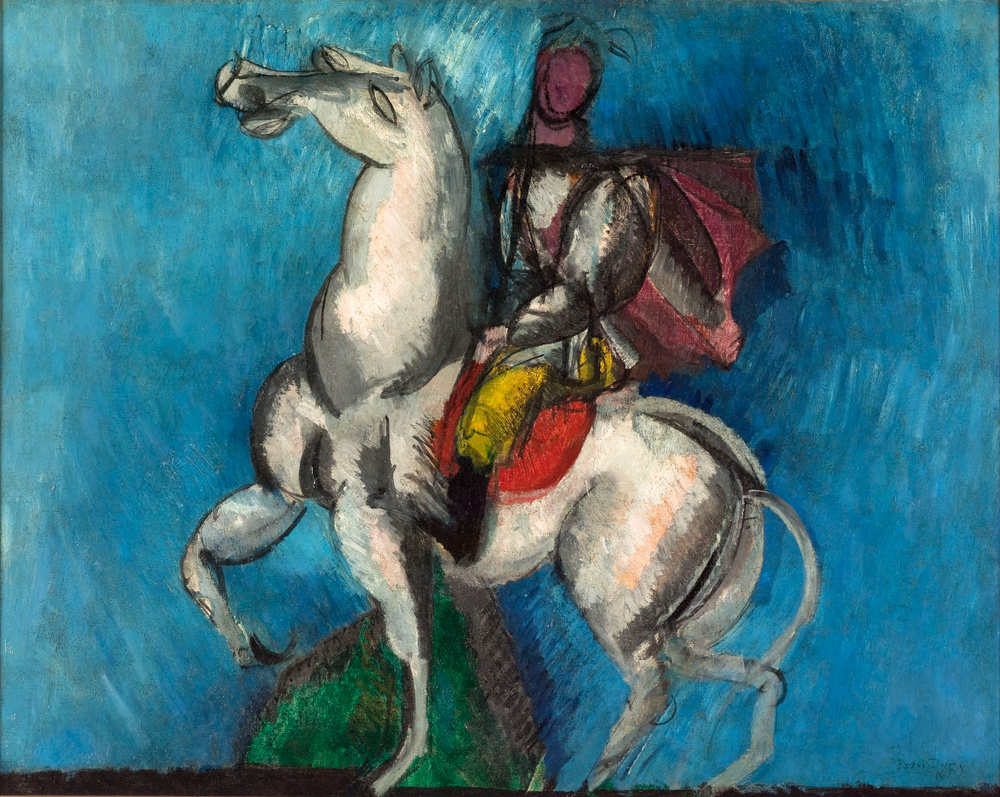
Raoul Dufy, 1914, Le Cavalier arabe (Le Cavalier blanc), oil on canvas, 66 x 81 cm. At the outbreak of World War I this painting was confiscated from the collection of Wilhelm Uhde by the French state and sold at Hôtel Drouot in 1921

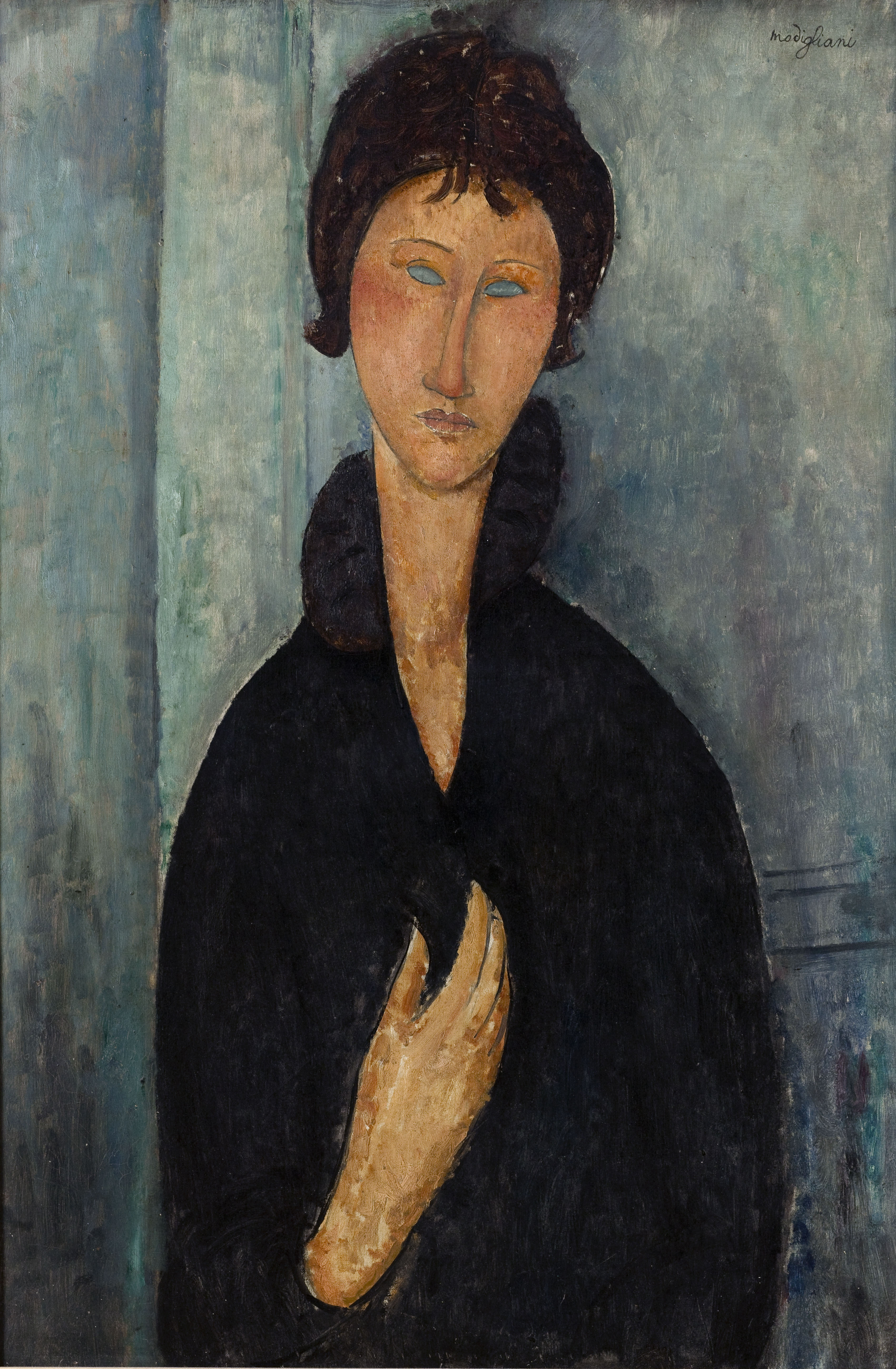
Amedeo Modigliani, c.1918, The woman with blue eyes, oil on canvas, 81 x 54 cm

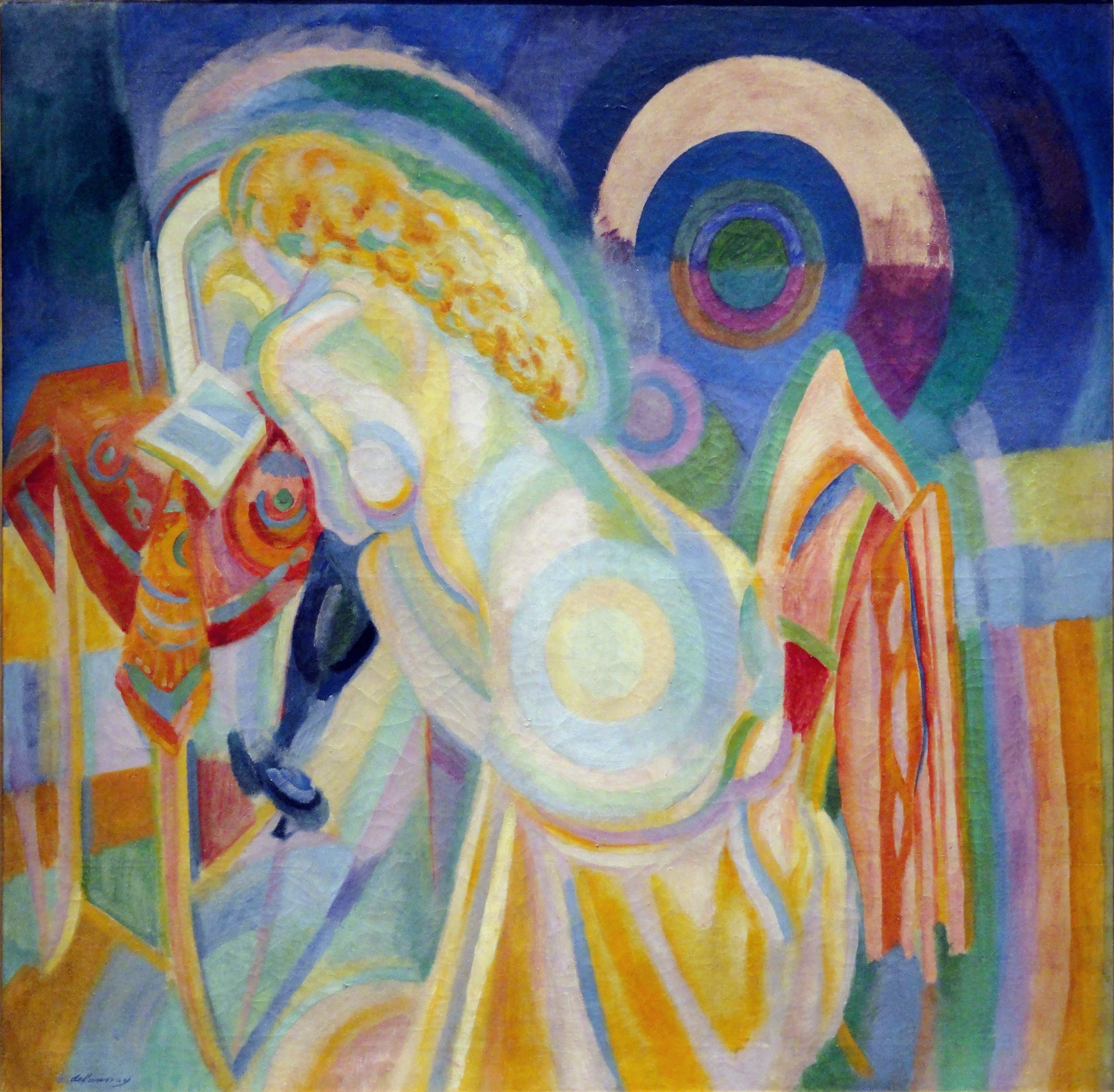
Robert Delaunay, 1915, Nu à la toilette (Nu à la coiffeuse), oil on canvas, 140 × 142 cm

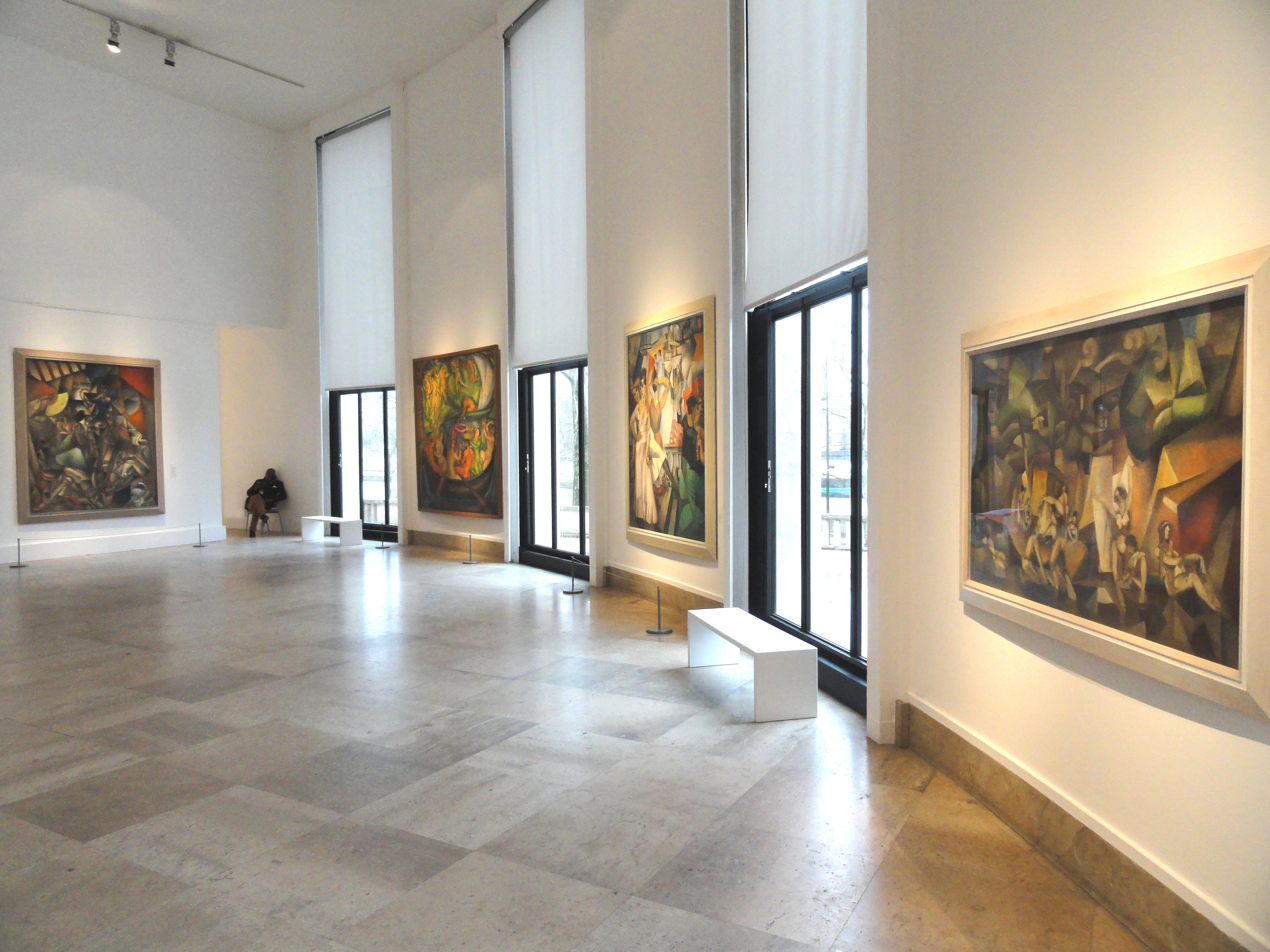
Jean Metzinger, L'Oiseau Bleu (left), André Lhote, L'Escale and Dance (center), Albert Gleizes, Les Baigneuses (right), Musée d'Art Moderne de la Ville de Paris, March 2014

== Exhibitions ==
- Robert Rauschenberg: 1968, Oeuvre de 1949 à 1968
- Andy Warhol: 1970, Rétrospective
- Wolf Vostell: 1974, Environments / Happenings 1958 - 1974, Rétrospective
- John Heartfield: 1974, Photomontages
- Hannah Höch: 1976, Rétrospective
- Nam June Paik: 1978 / 79, Rétrospective
- Joan Mitchell: 1982, Paintings 1970 - 1982, Rétrospective
- Gregor Schneider: 1998
- Jean-Michel Basquiat: 2010/11

== 2010 theft ==
On 20 May 2010, Vjeran Tomic broke into the museum and stole several paintings after meticulous preparation. The museum reported the overnight theft of five paintings from its collection the following morning. The paintings taken were Le pigeon aux petits pois (Pigeon with Peas) by Pablo Picasso, La Pastorale by Henri Matisse, L'Olivier Près de l'Estaque (Olive Tree near L'Estaque) by Georges Braque, La Femme à l'Éventail (Woman with a Fan) by Amedeo Modigliani and Nature Morte au Chandelier (Still Life with Candlestick) by Fernand Léger and were valued at €100 million ($123 million USD). A window frame had been lifted out, and CCTV footage showed a masked man taking the paintings. Authorities believe the thief acted alone. The man carefully removed the paintings from their frames, which he left behind.

The theft was investigated by the Brigade de Répression du Banditisme specialist unit of the French Police. It is unclear why the alarm systems in the museum failed to detect the robbery, staff only noticing when they arrived at the museum just before 7:00 am.

For fear that investigators were closing in on the thief, accomplices apparently destroyed the paintings. "I threw them into the trash," cried Yonathan Birn, one of three people on trial in the case, "I made the worst mistake of my existence." However, neither the judge nor the other defendants believed Birn's statement. The authorities believe all of the paintings were removed from France. Birn's co-defendants testified he was "too smart" to destroy €100 million worth of artwork. The French auctioneer and president of the Association du Palais de Tokyo, Pierre Cornette de Saint-Cyr, commented, "These five paintings are unsellable, so thieves, sirs, you are imbeciles. Now return them."

The theft follows the $162 million heist of masterpieces by Cézanne, Degas, Van Gogh and Monet from Foundation E.G. Bührle in Zurich in February 2008 and could be one of the biggest art thefts in history (by value). It has been described as the "heist of the century".

Pablo Picasso, Le pigeon aux petits pois (Pigeon with Peas), 1911, oil on canvas, 65 x 54 cm

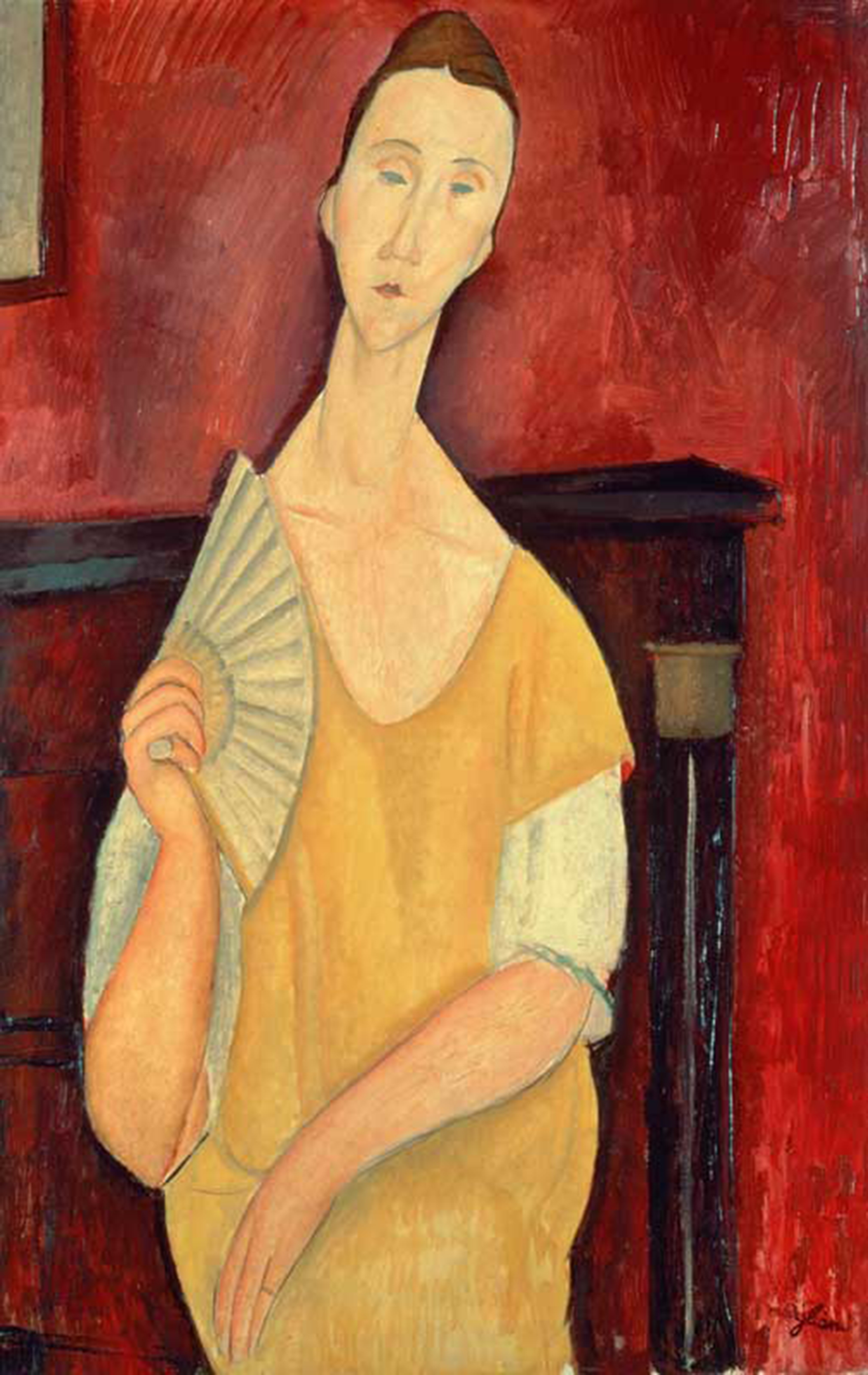
Amedeo Modigliani, 1919, La Femme à l'Éventail (Woman with a Fan), 1919, oil on canvas, 100 x 65 cm
