= Governor's School for the Arts =

Magnet school in Virginia, United States

Coordinates: 36.887611°N 76.312278°W

The Governor's School for the Arts

Location
- 254 Granby Street; Norfolk, Virginia 23510; United States

Information
- School type: Public, Regional Secondary Arts School
- Founded: 1987
- School district: Chesapeake, Franklin, Isle of Wight County, Norfolk, Portsmouth, Southampton County, Suffolk, and Virginia Beach
- Executive Director: Michelle Cihak
- Grades: 9-12
- Enrollment: 355
- Programs: Dance, Theatre & Film, Musical Theatre, Instrumental Music, Visual Arts, Vocal Music
- Website: http://www.gsarts.net

The Governor's School for the Arts is a regional secondary arts school sponsored by the Virginia Department of Education and the public school divisions of Chesapeake, Franklin, Isle of Wight County, Norfolk, Portsmouth, Southampton County, Suffolk, and Virginia Beach. It is one of 19 Virginian academic-year Governor's Schools and provides intensive educational opportunities for identified gifted students in instrumental music, vocal music, dance, musical theatre, theatre & film, and visual arts. The school is housed in the historic Monroe Building in downtown Norfolk.

Of the 97 student reviews of the School's programs on the School Report Site, Niche, all are average or above with 58 ranking the school as "excellent."

== Dance ==
The dance program provides a broad range of styles to its students, including ballet, modern, and jazz. The dancers showcase their skills three times annually, one of which is a joint performance with the Virginia Stage Company. In addition to these performances, the dance department hosts the regional high school dance festival every two years.

== Theatre & Film ==
The Theatre and Film track has an average membership of 50 students. It is housed in the Monroe Building/Wells Theatre complex, home of the Virginia Stage Company. A flexible black-box theatre in the complex serves as the principal producing space for the theatre program.

Students have the opportunity to work in the Wells Theatre, which closely resembles Broadway's Helen Hayes Theatre. Instruction takes place in classrooms, studios, and rehearsal space, and students receive hands-on experience with computer lighting and sound equipment.

The department produces about three or four main stage productions and several smaller independent productions per year. Students have the opportunity to train and perform with professional theatre artists and visiting faculty from university theatre departments. Internships with the Virginia Stage Company (LORT C) are available for selected students.

In curriculum, the Theatre Department offers hands-on performance experience in a variety of dramatic styles and periods, ranging from Classical Greek to Shakespeare, Commedia dell'arte and contemporary American writing, including on-camera work and screen material. Students are also provided many college-level courses such as Theatre History, Acting For The Camera, Directing, and Scene Study. Moreover, students are offered training to support the demands of heightened language and stylized material, preparing them for auditions at the collegiate level. Students also have the opportunity to rehearse and perform material that is unavailable in a typical secondary school setting. Productions of note include Heathen Valley, The Wrestling Season, The Cripple of Inishmaan, The Laramie Project, The Importance Of Being Earnest, Playing With Fire (The Frankenstein Story) and original student work focused on contemporary issues and civil rights.

Unique on its own, the department has three tracks students can be accepted into, Performance, Technical Theatre & Design, as well as a Film track.

== Musical theatre ==
The Musical Theatre Department is the smallest department at the Governor's School for the Arts. The department consists of roughly 30 students with an equal male-to-female ratio. The program is designed to prepare students for professional careers in musical theatre, music/recording, television, film, and live performance.

== Instrumental music ==
With an average enrollment of 80 students, the instrumental music program is one of the largest of the GSA departments. The program offers professional training and a variety of performance experience to classical and jazz performers including those interested in conducting, composition, and audio engineering.

Instrumental music students are given three hours of training each weekday afternoon. All classes take place on the downtown Norfolk campus.

== Visual arts ==
The visual arts department encourages in-depth exploration and research in an array of studio courses in the fields of printmaking, painting, photography, computer imaging, video imaging additive, subtractive, constructed sculpture, design, and other areas such as medical illustration and fashion design. Additionally, students take drawing and art history classes as well as classes that focus on conceptualization, analysis, and criticism.

The schedule for Visual Arts students is based around two-hour elective studios which are taken daily, along with either art history, concepts, or criticism. Each student chooses two elective studios from a variety offered each nine weeks. Portfolio development is a focus of the visual arts program. With guidance from the department chair, students select two electives for each of the four nine-week grading periods. In addition to the typical electives, advanced students may apply for independent study in a particular area.

== Vocal music ==
The Vocal Music Department has an annual total enrollment of 30-40 9th-12th grade vocal students. The department offers classically-based training in all aspects of music, from theory to applied voice.

Students perform solo and ensemble roles in student productions, and learn vocal repertoire in opera, operetta, art song, and legitimate musical theatre as well as small- and large-scale choral works.

== Notable alumni ==
- Paige Jennifer Barr, "Sarah's Key"
- Matt Caplan, Rent Broadway and National Tour, Spider-Man: Turn Off the Dark Original Broadway Cast
- Mary Faber, How to Succeed in Business Without Really Trying Broadway, American Idiot Original Broadway Cast, Avenue Q Broadway, Saved Off-Broadway.
- Grant Gustin, Glee as Sebastian Smythe, West Side Story National Tour, The Flash as Barry Allen (The Flash)
- Tiffany Haas, Wicked Broadway/National Tour, The Drowsy Chaperone National Tour
- Van Hughes, American Idiot Broadway and National Tour, Hairspray Broadway, 9 to 5 Broadway
- Tiffany Howard, Memphis Broadway
- Ross Iannatti, Rema Hort Mann Grant.
- Zachary Knighton, Happy Endings on ABC, The Hitcher
- Marjorie Owens, Met National Council Auditions Winner 2006
- Emmy Raver-Lampman, Hair National Tour/Broadway, Jekyll & Hyde National Tour/Broadway, A Night with Janis Joplin Broadway, Wicked (National Tour), Hamilton
- Ryan Speedo Green, Met National Council Auditions Winner 2011
- Daniel Turner, Virginia Museum of Fine Arts Award, The Pollock-Krasner Foundation Award
- Adrienne Warren, Danielle in Bring It On OBC, Dreamgirls National Tour, The Wiz, Trans-Siberian Orchestra Tour, Tina Turner in Tina Turner The Musical
