= Angela Johnson =

Angela Johnson may also refer to:

- Angela Johnson (basketball) (born 1953), Canadian Olympic basketball player
- Angela Johnson (writer) (born 1961), children's author
- Angela Davis Johnson, American painter
- Angela Jonsson (born 1990), Indian model and actress
- Anjelah Johnson (born 1982), comedian
- Angela Jane Johnson (born 1964), first woman sentenced to death by a U.S. Federal jury since the 1950s, for the 1993 Iowa murders

== See also ==
- Angela John (singer)
- Angela V. John, Welsh historian
