= Will Guidara =

American restaurateur

- Born: William Guidara; 1979 (age 46–47); Sleepy Hollow, New York, U.S.
- Education: Hackley School; Cornell University (BA)
- Occupation: Restaurateur
- Spouse: Christina Tosi (m. 2016)
- Children: 2

William Guidara (born 1979) is an American restaurateur based in New York City. Along with chef Daniel Humm, Guidara co-owned the Make It Nice hospitality group, established in 2011, which owns and operates Eleven Madison Park, NoMad New York, NoMad Los Angeles, NoMad Las Vegas, NoMad Bar and Made Nice.

== Background and career ==
A native of Sleepy Hollow, New York, Guidara graduated from the Cornell University School of Hotel Administration in 2001. Guidara began his dining room career at Wolfgang Puck's Spago in Beverly Hills. He then went on to various roles in Danny Meyer's Union Square Hospitality Group, including at Tabla, Café 2, and the restaurants at the Museum of Modern Art.

In 2006, Guidara became the General Manager of Eleven Madison Park, working with Humm. In 2011, Guidara and Humm purchased the restaurant from Union Square Hospitality Group.

In 2012, Guidara and Humm opened NoMad New York and the separate NoMad Bar in 2014. In April 2017, they opened Made Nice, a fast-casual restaurant in New York's Nomad neighborhood. In 2018, they launched NoMad Los Angeles, their first restaurant outside of New York City, followed by NoMad Las Vegas.

In 2019, Guidara and Humm announced that they were ending their partnership, with Humm buying out Guidara, and Guidara planning to start his own restaurant group.

In 2025, it was announced by the Athletics, a Major League Baseball team, that Guidara would partner with Aramark Sports + Entertainment as a strategic partner to help curate the food, beverage, and hospitality vision for the team's planned New Las Vegas Stadium, scheduled to open in 2028.

== Books ==
Guidara is the co-author of four books with Humm: Eleven Madison Park: The Cookbook (Little Brown, 2011), I Love New York: Ingredients and Recipes (Ten Speed, 2013), The NoMad Cookbook and Eleven Madison Park: the Next Chapter.

=== Unreasonable Hospitality ===
Guidara's book Unreasonable Hospitality: The Remarkable Power of Giving People More Than They Expect was published in 2022.

In October 2022, Guidara gave a Ted Talk titled "The secret ingredients of great hospitality" discussing his concept of unreasonable hospitality and the story of serving a hot dog to tourists at Eleven Madison Park. The book is featured in the TV series The Bear, when the character Richie reads it in the episode "Forks". Guidara later received story credit for the third episode of the third season alongside series creator Christopher Storer, and appears as himself in the third-season finale alongside his wife Christina Tosi.

== Awards ==
James Beard Foundation Awards

- 2016 James Beard Foundation Award – Outstanding Service, Eleven Madison Park
- 2014 James Beard Foundation Award – Outstanding Bar Program, NoMad New York
- 2008 James Beard Foundation Award – Outstanding Wine Service, Eleven Madison Park

Michelin

- Eleven Madison Park, 3 stars 2012-2018
- NoMad New York, 1 star 2013-2018

Additional Awards

- 2016 Wall Street Journal – Innovator Awards

== Works ==
- 2022: Unreasonable Hospitality (Publisher: Optimism Press)
- 2017: Eleven Madison Park: The Next Chapter (Publisher: Ten Speed)
- 2015: The NoMad Cookbook (Publisher: Ten Speed)
- 2013: I Love New York: Ingredients and Recipes (Publisher: Ten Speed)
- 2011: Eleven Madison Park: The Cookbook (Publisher: Little Brown)
