= Nicole Plue =

American pastry chef

Nicole Plue is a pastry chef based in San Francisco. She is the Director of Pastry Arts at the San Francisco Cooking School. She was formerly the executive pastry chef at the Healdsburg, California Michelin star restaurant Cyrus.

She began her career at restaurants like One Market and Hawthorns Lane in San Francisco. She went to work at Eleven Madison Park in Manhattan before returning to California.

In 2010, she won the James Beard Award for outstanding pastry chef.
