= Daniel Humm =

Swiss chef and restaurant owner (born 1976)

- Born: September 21, 1976 (age 50); Strengelbach, Switzerland
- Spouse(s): Geneen Wright (divorced) Annabelle Dexter-Jones (m. 2025)
- Children: 3
- Culinary career
- Rating
- Michelin stars
- Current restaurants
- Eleven Madison Park, Clemente Bar
- Previous restaurants
- NoMad New York, NoMad Los Angeles, Made Nice
- Website: makeitnicenyc.com elevenmadisonpark.com thenomadhotel.com madenicenyc.com

Daniel Humm (born September 21, 1976) is a Swiss chef and owner of Daniel Humm Hospitality, the New York-based hospitality group behind Eleven Madison Park, Clemente Bar, HUMM, and direct-to-consumer lifestyle brand Eleven Madison Home. In September 2024, he was appointed a UNESCO Goodwill Ambassador for food education due to his advocacy for sustainable food systems.

In 2003, Humm moved to the United States to become the executive chef at Campton Place in San Francisco where he received four stars from the San Francisco Chronicle. Three years later, he moved to New York to become the executive chef at Eleven Madison Park, and in 2011 he and his business partner Will Guidara purchased the restaurant from Danny Meyer's Union Square Hospitality Group. In 2017, Eleven Madison Park became number 1 on the World's 50 Best Restaurants. In October 2024, Humm opened Clemente Bar, a cocktail bar and tasting counter on the second floor of Eleven Madison Park. In September 2026, he and food & beverage CPG veteran Mark Ramadan launched Riff, a line of chef-crafted meal kits. Exactly 2 years after the opening of Clemente Bar, Chef Humm launched his first namesake restaurant in the United States, HUMM, on October 10th 2026 in The West Village.

== Career ==
Over the course of Humm's tenure, he and Eleven Madison Park have received numerous accolades, including four stars from The New York Times, six James Beard Foundation Awards (including Outstanding Chef and Outstanding Restaurant in America), three stars from the Michelin Guide, and the #1 spot on The World's 50 Best Restaurants. In 2011, Humm and Will Guidara purchased Eleven Madison Park from Danny Meyer's Union Square Hospitality Group, and the following year also opened the critically acclaimed NoMad New York which garnered three stars from The New York Times, one Michelin Star, and a James Beard Foundation Award. In 2018 Humm and Guidara opened NoMad Los Angeles, their first restaurant outside of New York City. Humm and Guidara parted ways in July 2019 with Humm buying out Guidara from Eleven Madison Park. In late 2019, Humm opened Davies and Brook, his first restaurant outside the US at London's historic Claridge's.

In January 2020, Humm made the decision to end the partnership with the NoMad group of hotels in New York, Los Angeles, and Las Vegas.

Humm is the owner of Daniel Humm Hospitality group and the author of five books: Eleven Madison Park: The Cookbook, I Love New York: Ingredients and Recipes, The NoMad Cookbook, Eleven Madison Park: The Next Chapter, Eat More Plants, and Eleven Madison Park: The Plant Based Chapter. Humm is a co-founder of Rethink Food, a New York City-based nonprofit aimed at creating a more equitable, sustainable food system. When the COVID-19 pandemic led to Eleven Madison Park temporarily shutting down, Humm partnered with Rethink to keep a dozen chefs on staff, preparing and delivering meals to first responders and food-insecure communities throughout New York. At its peak, Eleven Madison Park was producing 3,000 meals a day to be served throughout underserved neighborhoods in The Bronx and Brooklyn.

The restaurant continues to support this cause in a number of ways — including giving excess ingredients to Rethink Food and donating a percentage of the revenue from each reservation at Eleven Madison Park.

In the fall of 2024, Humm opened Clemente Bar, a bar and dining hotspot, on the second story of Eleven Madison Park. Clemente Bar was born of a collaboration with, and named for, the Italian contemporary artist Francesco Clemente, who painted numerous original works within the bar space.

In September 2026, Humm teamed up with food and beverage CPG veteran Mark Ramadan to launch Riff, a line of shelf stable, chef crafted meal kits. The goal was to bridge the gap between convenience and cooking that had been overlooked by the industry with the rise of meal kits and delivery services. The launch kicked off with five distinct varieties, available at Target locations nationwide and online.

In October 2026, Chef Humm opened his first namesake restaurant in the United States, HUMM. Located on 435 Hudson Street in The West Village, HUMM offers a more casual, Modern American cuisine. expression of Chef’s cooking and dining philosophy. The restaurant features major artist collaborations, with works by Louise Bourgeois integrated throughout the bar, a large-scale ceiling fresco and private dining room designed by Francesco Clemente, and a series of monumental works by Rashid Johnson and Roni Horn who will anchor the main dining room.

== Plant-based cooking ==
In November 2021, Humm left Claridges after they rejected his proposal for a vegan menu due to concern about the potential response from regular customers. That year, he reopened Eleven Madison Park with a completely plant-based menu. Eleven Madison Park became the first and only plant-based restaurant in Michelin Guide history to receive a three-star rating in October 2022. The restaurant again received a three-Michelin-star rating in 2023.

While brainstorming for the plant-based menu he would soon debut at Eleven Madison Park, Humm kept a creative journal documenting the restaurant's transition in 2021, which was later published by Steidl Publishers under the title Eat More Plants. In January 2024, a docuseries titled You Are What You Eat: A Twin Experiment on Netflix included Eleven Madison Park and Humm's decision to have the restaurant change to plant-based cooking. Also, in early 2024, Humm announced Eleven Madison Park's first-plant based cookbook, set to be published in November 2024.

Humm has commented that he converted to plant-based cooking due to environmental concerns such as climate change and overfishing.

In September 2024, Humm was appointed as a UNESCO Goodwill Ambassador for food education. Through his work with UNESCO, Humm serves as an advocate, discussing the need for sustainable food systems and to protect and preserve food culture around the world.

Humm is vegetarian. He has said that he prefers terms such as "plant-forward" or "pro-planet" to describe his diet, noting, "This is the future. We’re not saying anti-meat, but we're saying pro-planet. All we have to do is reduce how much animal protein we consume."

In October 2025, Eleven Madison Park reintroduced select animal proteins alongside its plant-based offerings.

== Awards ==
James Beard Foundation Awards

- 2016 James Beard Foundation Award – Outstanding Service, Eleven Madison Park
- 2014 James Beard Foundation Award – Outstanding Bar Program, NoMad New York
- 2012 James Beard Foundation Award – Outstanding Chef
- 2010 James Beard Foundation Award – Best Chef New York City
- 2008 James Beard Foundation Award – Outstanding Wine Service, Eleven Madison Park

The World's 50 Best Restaurants

Eleven Madison Park has attained "Best of the Best" status, The World's 50 Best Restaurants’ nomenclature for restaurants which have topped the annual poll of The World's 50 Best Restaurants and are therefore no longer eligible to be voted on in new editions of the list.

- 2018 The World's 50 Best Restaurants – Number 4, Eleven Madison Park
- 2017 The World's 50 Best Restaurants – Number 1, Eleven Madison Park
- 2016 The World's 50 Best Restaurants – Number 3, Eleven Madison Park
- 2015 The World's 50 Best Restaurants – Number 5, Eleven Madison Park
- 2015 The World's 50 Best Restaurants – Chef's Choice Award
- 2014 The World's 50 Best Restaurants – Number 4, Eleven Madison Park
- 2013 The World's 50 Best Restaurants – Number 5, Eleven Madison Park
- 2012 The World's 50 Best Restaurants – Number 10, Eleven Madison Park
- 2011 The World's 50 Best Restaurants – Number 24, Eleven Madison Park
- 2010 The World's 50 Best Restaurants – Number 50, Eleven Madison Park

The World's 50 Best Bars

- 2017 The World's 50 Best Bars – Number 3, The NoMad Bar
- 2016 The World's 50 Best Bars – Number 8, The NoMad Bar
- 2015 The World's 50 Best Bars – Number 24, The Elephant Bar at NoMad New York

Michelin

- 2025 Michelin Guide - Three Stars, Eleven Madison Park
- 2024 Michelin Guide - Three Stars, Eleven Madison Park
- 2023 Michelin Guide - Three Stars, Eleven Madison Park
- 2022 Michelin Guide - Three Stars, Eleven Madison Park
- 2018 Michelin Guide – Three Stars, Eleven Madison Park
- 2018 Michelin Guide – One Star, NoMad New York
- 2017 Michelin Guide – Three Stars, Eleven Madison Park
- 2017 Michelin Guide – One Star, NoMad New York
- 2016 Michelin Guide – Three Stars, Eleven Madison Park
- 2016 Michelin Guide – One Star, NoMad New York
- 2015 Michelin Guide – Three Stars, Eleven Madison Park
- 2015 Michelin Guide – One Star, NoMad New York
- 2014 Michelin Guide – Three Stars, Eleven Madison Park
- 2014 Michelin Guide – One Star, NoMad New York
- 2013 Michelin Guide – Three Stars, Eleven Madison Park
- 2013 Michelin Guide – One Star, NoMad New York
- 2012 Michelin Guide – Three Stars, Eleven Madison Park
- 2011 Michelin Guide – Three Stars, Eleven Madison Park
- 2010 Michelin Guide – One Star, Eleven Madison Park

Additional awards

- 2016 The Wall Street Journal – Innovator Awards
- 2015 The New York Times – Four Stars, Eleven Madison Park
- 2012 The New York Times – Three Stars, NoMad New York
- 2012 Crain's New York – 40 Under 40
- 2010 Forbes Travel Guide – Five Stars, Eleven Madison Park
- 2009 The New York Times – Four Stars, Eleven Madison Park
- 2005 Food & Wine – Best New Chefs

== Books ==
- 2011: Eleven Madison Park: The Cookbook (Publisher: Little Brown)
- 2013: I Love New York: Ingredients and Recipes (Publisher: Ten Speed)
- 2015: The NoMad Cookbook (Publisher: Ten Speed)
- 2017: Eleven Madison Park: The Next Chapter (Publisher: Ten Speed)
- 2023: Eat More Plants (Publisher: Steidl)

2024 Eleven Madison Park: The Plant Based Chapter, publisher Little Brown.

== See also ==
- List of Michelin starred restaurants
