= Skip O'Brien =

American actor (1950–2011)

- Born: Bernard Francis O'Brien; August 20, 1950; Jersey City, New Jersey, U.S.
- Died: April 6, 2011 (aged 60); Hazlet, New Jersey, U.S.
- Occupation: Actor
- Years active: 1985–2008
- Spouse: Susanne Bordeaux (2 children)
- Family: Daniel O'Brien (nephew)

Bernard Francis "Skip" O'Brien (August 20, 1950 – April 6, 2011) was an American actor. Although he appeared in films such as 1997's Liar Liar and 2007's The Hitcher, he is perhaps best known for his recurring role as Detective Ray O'Riley from 2000 to 2003 on the American television show CSI.

O'Brien was born in Jersey City, New Jersey, and grew up on the Jersey Shore in Union Beach. After serving in the United States Marine Corps during the Vietnam War, he graduated from Brookdale Community College in 1980. O'Brien spent his career in television and film living in California then moved to Hazlet, New Jersey in 2010. He died on April 6, 2011, at the age of 60.

== Filmography ==
Year	Title	Role	Notes
1985	Prizzi's Honor	Bartender	
1985	Echo Park	Prisoner	
1990	Side Out	Policeman	
1995	Higher Learning	Security Guard	
1995	Double Rush	The Policeman	Episode "They Shoot Guns, Don't They?"
1996	Black Sheep	State Trooper	
1996	A Very Brady Sequel	Construction Worker	
1997	Liar Liar	Court Guard	
1999	The Muse	Universal Studio Guard	
2000-2003	CSI: Crime Scene Investigation	Detective Ray O'Riley	24 episodes
2001	Blow	Customs Agent	
2007	The Hitcher	Sheriff Harlan Bremmer Sr.	
