= Ghetto Gastro =

New York based food and art collective

- Born: New York, New York
- Known for: Contemporary Art, Food, Cooking, Catering
- Website: Ghetto Gastro

Ghetto Gastro is a New York based collective of chefs and food enthusiasts with deep ties to the Bronx that was formed in 2012. The founding members are Jon Gray, Pierre Serrao and Lester Walker.

== History ==
Ghetto Gastro was founded in 2012 by Jon Gray, Pierre Serrao and Lester Walker.

In March 2018 Ghetto Gastro collaborated with Marvel Studios to present "Taste of Wakanda" at New York Fashion Week, a food event which promoted the superhero film Black Panther.

In 2019 they opened the Labyrinth 1.1 space on the north shore of the Harlem River in the Bronx. The collective teamed up with the Bronx Oaxacan restaurant La Morada and the non-profit Rethink Food to distribute free meals to Black Lives Matter protesters during the George Floyd protests. By June 22, 2020, Ghetto Gastro had served 35,000 free meals, and announced that it planned to serve at least 75,000 meals.
