= The NoMad =

Hotel and restaurant in Manhattan, New York

- (2026)

General information
- Type: Hotel
- Location: 1170 Broadway, New York, United States
- Owner: Sydell Group

Website
- Official website
- 40.744960°N 73.988568°W

History
- Built: 1902–1903

Site notes
- Architect: Schickel & Ditmars
- Architectural style: Beaux Arts

Restaurant information
- Established: 2012
- Owner: Daniel Humm
- Head chef: Daniel Humm
- Rating: Michelin Guide, 2017

The NoMad was an integrated hotel and restaurant owned by the Sydell Group and located in the NoMad neighborhood of Manhattan, New York City. The restaurant of the same name was conceived by chef Daniel Humm and restaurateur Will Guidara of nearby Eleven Madison Park. The hotel was sometimes referred to as NoMad New York to differentiate from its sister locations in Las Vegas and Los Angeles. The building is a contributing property to the Madison Square North Historic District, a New York City Landmark.

The hotel was conceived by Andrew Zobler, Founder and CEO of the Sydell Group. The building has 12 floors and a Beaux-Arts facade. The interior was designed by French architect Jacques Garcia, inspired by the Parisian apartment of his youth. It was named after the relatively new NoMad neighborhood during a period of popularity.

The hotel closed permanently in March 2021 due to the COVID-19 pandemic.

== Hotel ==
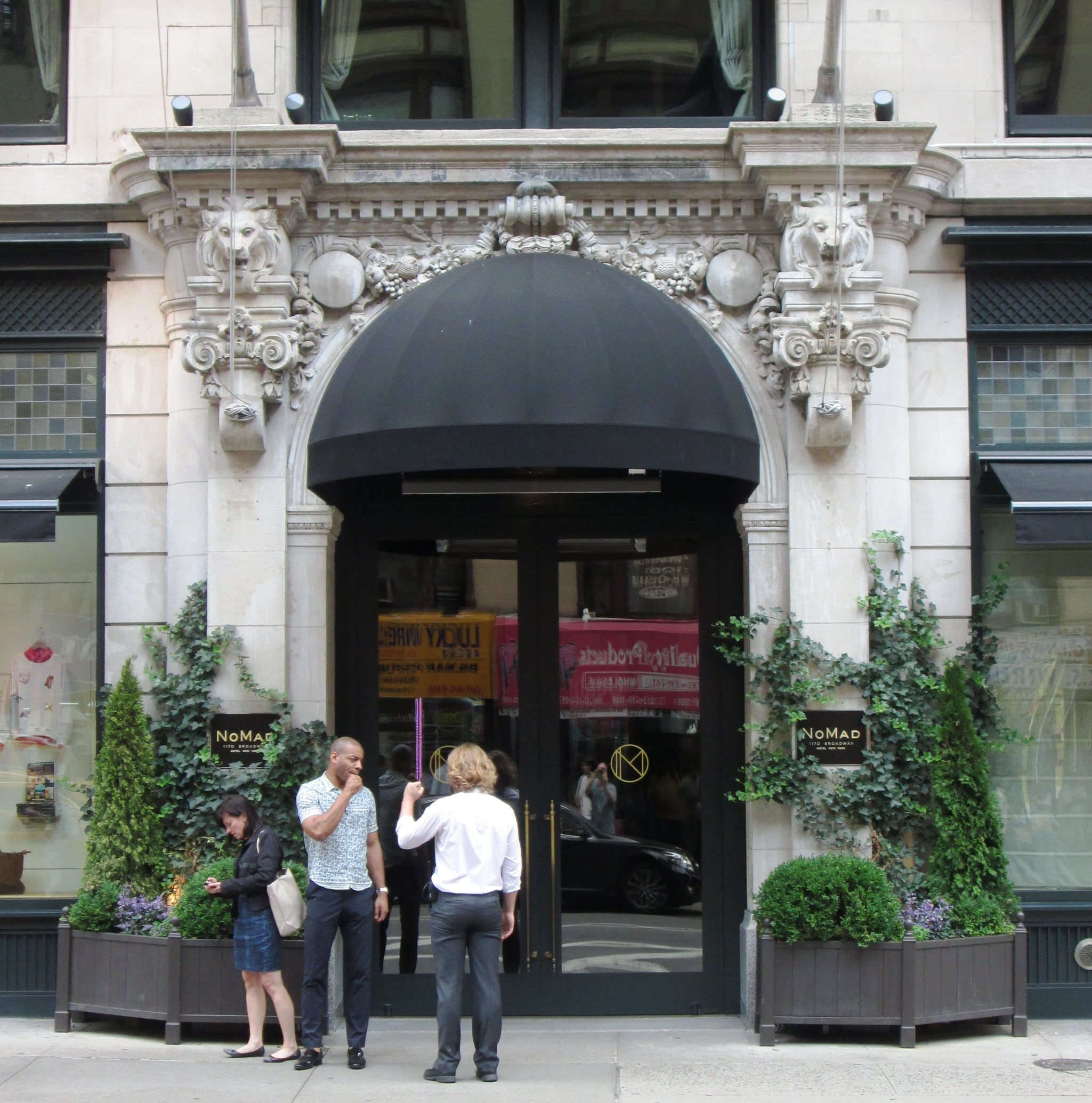
The hotel's entrance

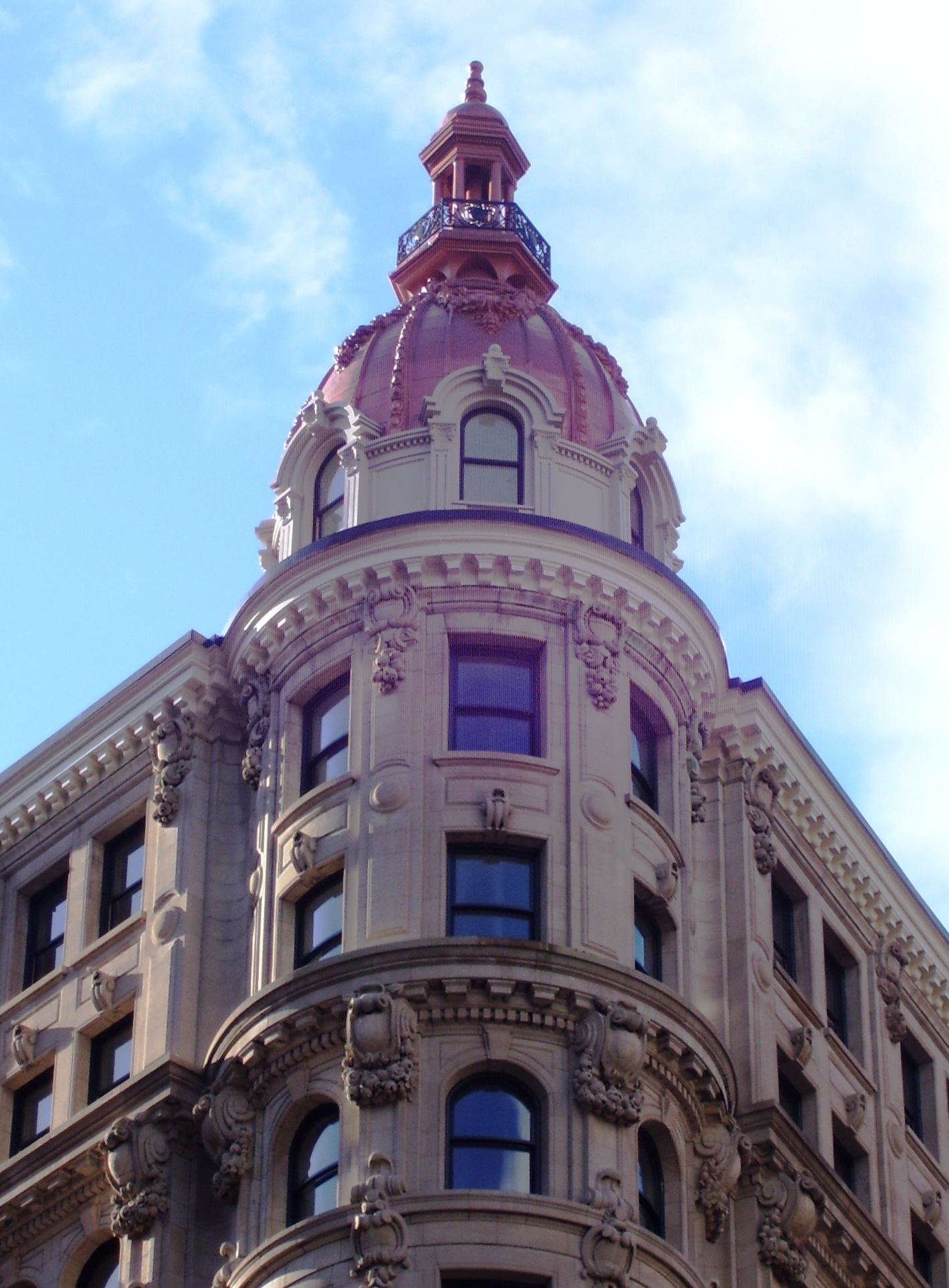
Cupola on the building's front corner

The hotel had a rooftop private dining space with outdoor seating. Its room service and event food was provided by the hotel restaurant.

== Restaurant ==
The NoMad restaurant opened in 2012 and had one Michelin star. It served seasonal European-American cuisine. Their signature dish was a whole roasted chicken for two stuffed with foie gras and truffles. James Kent was the executive chef from 2013 to 2017.

Food critic Adam Platt described the restaurant as appealing to multiple different audiences, with "a hodgepodge of styles under one roof". The restaurant had five rooms, including a glass-ceiling atrium for dining and a stand-up bar for cocktails, wine, and snacks. The library and parlour also offered additional seating in different atmospheres.

Humm and Guidara ran the nearby restaurant Eleven Madison Park, owned by Danny Meyer. Their proposal to open the NoMad restaurant themselves prompted Meyer to sell them Eleven Madison Park, as the two restaurants would be in competition.

== History ==
The building is located at 1170 Broadway (1166–1172, also known as 14-18 West 28th Street) on the southeast corner of 28th Street and Broadway in the NoMad neighborhood of Manhattan. It was built in 1902–03 as stores and offices, and was designed by Schickel & Ditmars in the Beaux Arts style. The building was originally named after the first owner, Caroline H. Johnston, and called the Johnston building. It is located within the Madison Square North Historic District.

It was built at a time when the area's earlier residences, hotels, and theaters were being replaced by high-rise commercial buildings.

== Architecture ==
The building is twelve stories tall, with five bays on each side, and with a limestone exterior. It has a rounded corner bay that faces north, topped with a domed cupola. The facade has paired windows and a three-story base with recessed windows and a molded crown. The arched entranceway has carved lions, festoons, a scrolled keystone, and other decorative elements.

== See also ==
- List of Michelin-starred restaurants in New York City
- The World's 50 Best Bars
