= Angela Davis Johnson =

American painter (born 1981)

- Born: 1981 (age 44–45); Orlando, Florida, U.S.
- Education: Governor's School for the Arts
- Known for: Painting; sculpture; installation art; ritual performance art
- Website: https://www.patreon.com/angeladavisjohnson/about

Angela Davis Johnson (born 1981) is an American interdisciplinary artist whose work includes themes related to the African diaspora and cultural memory in the American South. She has lived and worked in several cities, including Philadelphia, Atlanta, New Orleans, and Little Rock.

== Early life ==
Angela Davis Johnson was born in 1981 in Orlando, Florida. Later, she moved with her family to Virginia, where she graduated from the Governor's School for the Arts in Norfolk. Her early interest in art was developed under her mother, who provided her and her siblings with art supplies and encouraged them to engage in creative activities such as singing, reading, and whittling.

== Career ==
Davis Johnson cites her ancestry, which includes practitioners of midwifery, healing, and nursing, as an influence on her artistic themes. Her work primarily addresses social and historical challenges faced by African Americans. She has been nominated for several awards.

In 2018, The New York Times described her painting An Open Mouth Creek as depicting “a Black girl with sad eyes and blue hair whose mouth is shut, though she appears to want to speak.” She stated that the work addresses the historical silencing of Black women."The New York Times noted that Davis Johnson and other Black women artists who address themes of race and politics have been told by curators and others that their work would be more “commercially viable” if they focused on less challenging subjects. Reports on her exhibitions have also noted the scope and subjects of her imagery. She frequently incorporates scraps of fabric into her oil paintings as an homage to her mother, a seamstress, and to introduce humble materials into fine‑art contexts.

== Awards, fellowships and residencies ==
=== Awards and fellowships ===
- 2020/21 Intercultural Leadership Institute Fellowship
- 2018 MINT ATL Leap Year Fellowship
- 2017 Joan Mitchell Foundation Painters & Sculptors Grant Nominee
- 2017 Ensemble Theater Grant Awardee
- 2016 Joan Mitchell Emerging Artist Nominee
- 2015 Alternate Roots/Joan Mitchell Visual Art Scholar

=== Residencies ===
- 2022 Fountainhead Residency, Miami, FL
- 2022 The New Freedom Project/ BAIA, Atlanta, GA
- 2019 Tempus Project, Tampa, FL
- 2019 Hampshire College, Amherst, MA
- 2019 Fallawayinto Intensive, Philadelphia, PA
- 2018 Hambidge Arts Center Residency, Rabun County, GA
- 2018 MINT Leap Year, Atlanta, GA
