= The Hitcher (2007 film) =

- Theatrical release poster
- Directed by: Dave Meyers
- Screenplay by: Eric Bernt; Eric Red; Jake Wade Wall
- Based on: The Hitcher by Eric Red
- Produced by: Michael Bay; Andrew Form; Brad Fuller; Charles Meeker; Alfred Haber
- Starring: Sean Bean; Sophia Bush; Zachary Knighton; Neal McDonough
- Cinematography: James Hawkinson
- Edited by: Jim May
- Music by: Steve Jablonsky
- Production companies: Platinum Dunes; Intrepid Pictures; Charles R. Meeker Productions; Alfred Haber Productions
- Distributed by: Rogue Pictures
- Release date: January 19, 2007
- Running time: 84 minutes
- Country: United States
- Language: English
- Budget: $10 million
- Box office: $25.4 million

The Hitcher is a 2007 American road horror thriller film starring Sean Bean, Sophia Bush and Zachary Knighton. It is a remake of the 1986 film of the same title starring Rutger Hauer, C. Thomas Howell and Jennifer Jason Leigh. The Hitcher was directed by Dave Meyers and produced by Michael Bay's production company Platinum Dunes.

== Plot ==
College students, Jim Halsey and Grace Andrews are driving across New Mexico to meet their friends for spring break. On their first night of driving, they nearly hit a hitchhiker, who was standing in the middle of the road. Jim swerves, and the car spins out of control to a stop. As the man approaches, Grace insists that someone else will stop to help him, and they take off.

Later that night at a gas station, Jim meets the hitchhiker, who introduces himself as John Ryder and asks for a ride, and Jim reluctantly agrees. While on the road, he becomes increasingly violent and attacks them, holding a knife to Grace's eye. He tells Jim the only way to save them both is to say, "I want to die". Jim hits the brakes, causing John to hit his head on the windshield, and then Jim kicks him out of the car. Grace tells Jim she wants to go home, but he persuades her to continue with their trip.

The following day, Jim and Grace spot John in a family's car. The two try to warn the family, but crash their car. They are forced to continue on foot and eventually find the family's car on the side of the road; both the children and mother are already dead, with the father badly wounded. They take the car and stop at a nearby cafe to tend to the wound, but the man dies.

Suspected of having committed the murders, Jim and Grace are arrested and brought to the police station. John arrives shortly after and kills everyone at the station, while Jim and Grace flee. Lieutenant Esteridge orders the rest of the station to pursue the couple, but John shows up and single-handedly takes out all the police cruisers and a helicopter, helping Jim and Grace escape the police.

Grace and Jim check in at a motel. Grace falls asleep but is woken by John, who attempts to sexually assault her. She fights him off and hides in the bathroom. John disappears, so Grace leaves the motel to look for Jim and finds him chained at the wrists and ankles between a truck and a trailer. Grace approaches the truck, which John is revving, and demands that he stop. The police arrive and tell her to drop her gun, as John drives forward and splits Jim in half, killing him. John is then apprehended by the police.

The next morning, Lt. Esteridge tells Grace that the real John Ryder is missing, and they do not know the true identity of the hitchhiker. He informs her that the hitchhiker will be transported across the state to another prison. During the journey, the hitchhiker breaks free from his restraints and kills everyone in the police van, causing the vehicle to crash, with Lt. Esteridge and Grace crashing close behind them. The hitchhiker shoots a pool of gasoline, igniting it with Estridge's handgun. Grace goes to search for and kill the hitchhiker, but is ambushed and disarmed, then thrown into the van and trapped by the hitchhiker, though she then manages to escape. The hitchhiker shoots and kills Lt. Esteridge with his own gun while he is injured and trapped in the car. Grace shoots the hitchhiker in the back with a shotgun and then in the chest. The hitchhiker asks her, "Feels good, doesn't it?" to which she replies, "I don't feel a thing," before shooting him in the head.

== Cast ==
- Sophia Bush as Grace Andrews
- Zachary Knighton as Jim Halsey
- Sean Bean as John Ryder / The Hitchhiker
- Neal McDonough as Lieutenant Esteridge
- Kyle Davis as Buford's Store Clerk
- Skip O'Brien as Harlan Bremmer Sr., Sheriff of Torrance County
- Travis Schuldt as Deputy Harlan Bremmer Jr.
- Danny Bolero as Officer Edwards
- Lauren Cohn as Marlene
- Yara Martinez as Beth
- Jeffrey Hutchinson as Young Father

== Production ==
The Hitcher is a remake of the 1986 film of the same name. It is the third remake of a horror film to be produced by Michael Bay's Platinum Dunes, following the commercially successful films The Texas Chainsaw Massacre (2003) and The Amityville Horror (2005). Bay said of the original: "I loved it as a kid and we can add some cool twists and turn it into a rocking film". Bay also suggested that the protagonist in the remake would be female. Dave Meyers was hired to direct the remake. Sean Bean and Sophia Bush were cast in January 2006; in June, Zachary Knighton joined the project. Production began in June.

== Release ==
=== Theatrical ===
The Hitcher held a special screening on January 18, 2007, at the ArcLight's Cinerama Dome in Hollywood, California; a majority of the cast and crew were in attendance. The film was released in theaters the following day.

=== Home media ===
The film was released on DVD and HD-DVD on May 1, 2007. The Hitcher became available on Blu-ray in Australia on December 10, 2008.

== Reception ==
=== Box office ===
The film debuted at number 4 at the US box office with $7,818,239 made in the opening week. After three weeks, the film placed number 11 at the box office and subsequently made $16,366,370. Five weeks after its nationwide release, The Hitcher had been pulled from most screens and was completely removed from cinemas after nine weeks. The Hitcher began its international release on March 1, 2007. As of June 30, 2009, the film has had a lifetime gross of $25.4 million.

=== Critical reception ===
As of July 2026, the film holds a 19% approval rating on the review aggregator Rotten Tomatoes, based on 105 reviews with an average rating of 3.84/10. The website's critics consensus reads: "Sean Bean tries giving motive and emotion to The Hitcher, but director Dave Meyers is more interested in cheap shocks and gratuitous gore and torture". On Metacritic, the film has a rating of 28/100, based on 16 reviews, indicating "generally unfavorable reviews". Empire gave the film two stars and said that the picture was totally inferior to the original. The Guardian said: "Don't even slow down for this one, certainly don't tag along for the ride". New York Post called it "the Jessica Simpson of psycho killer flicks – cheerfully in touch with its own brainlessness".

=== Accolades ===
Year	Award	Category	Work	Result	Ref
2007	Teen Choice Awards	Choice Movie Actress: Horror/Thriller	Sophia Bush	Won	
2007	Teen Choice Awards	Choice Movie: Breakout Female	Sophia Bush	Won	
2007	Vail Film Festival	Rising Star Award	Sophia Bush	Won	
2008	Taurus World Stunt Awards	Best Work In A Vehicle	Crew	Nominated	
