= Eleven Madison Park =

Restaurant in New York City

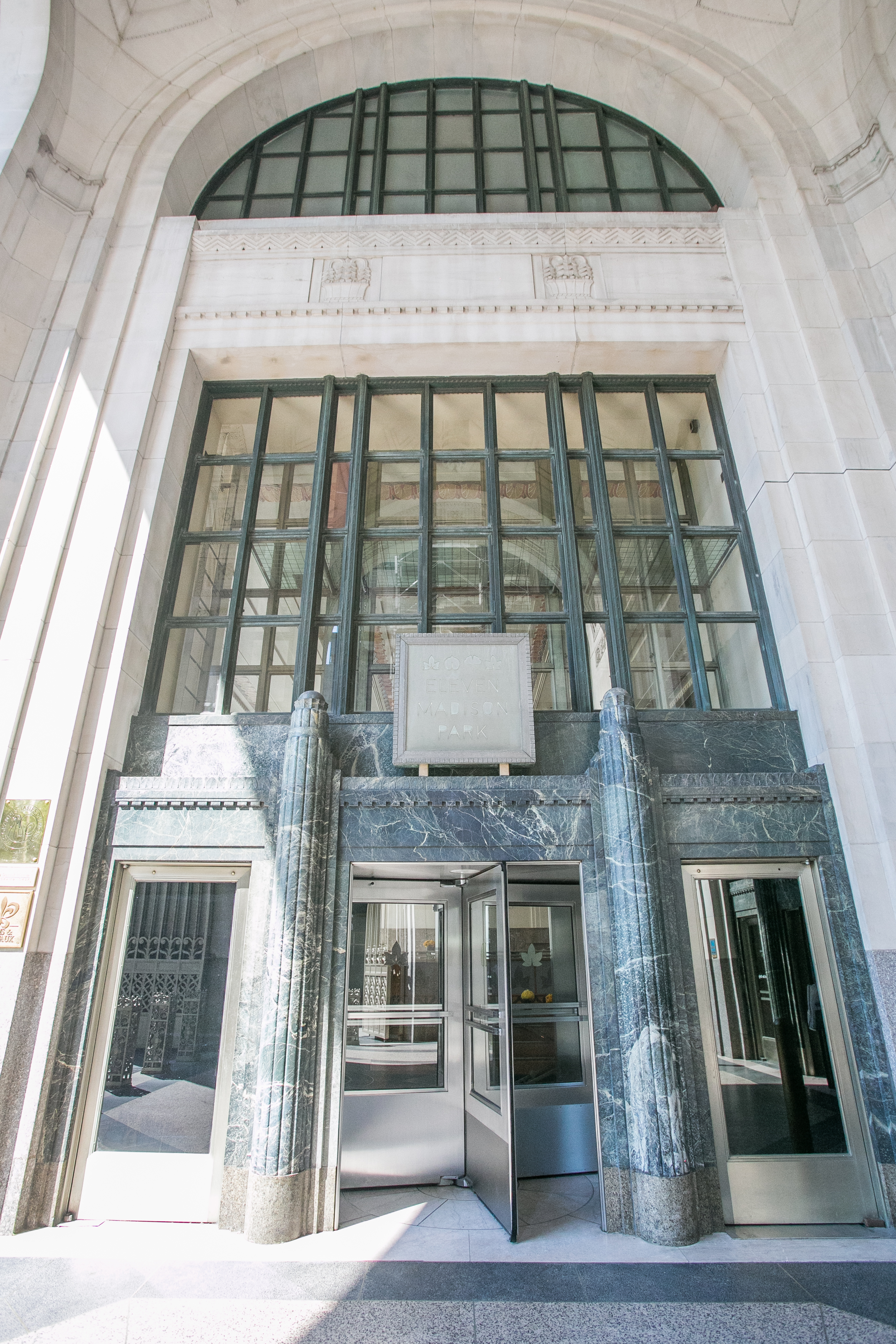
- Logo on window
- Interactive map of Eleven Madison Park

Restaurant information
- Established: 1998; 28 years ago
- Owner: Daniel Humm
- Previous owner: Danny Meyer
- Head chef: Daniel Humm
- Food type: Contemporary American
- Rating: Voted Best Restaurant in the World 2017, The World's 50 Best Restaurants; Michelin Guide, 2012–
- Location: 11 Madison Avenue, New York City (Flatiron District, Manhattan), New York, 10010, United States
- Coordinates: 40°44′30″N 73°59′14″W
- Seating capacity: 80
- Website: www.ElevenMadisonPark.com

Eleven Madison Park is a fine dining restaurant located inside the Metropolitan Life North Building at 11 Madison Avenue in the Flatiron District of Manhattan, New York City. Owned by Daniel Humm Hospitality, it has held 3 Michelin stars since 2012, and was ranked first among The World's 50 Best Restaurants in 2017.

== History ==
The restaurant, initially designed by Bentel & Bentel, is located in the Metropolitan Life North Building, facing Madison Square, at the intersection of Madison Avenue and 24th Street. The restaurant originally opened in 1998 and was owned by restaurateur Danny Meyer. In 2006, Chef Daniel Humm and Will Guidara began working at Eleven Madison Park, and in 2011 they purchased it from Meyer. The restaurant group's name is Daniel Humm Hospitality.

The restaurant's lease was renewed in 2016, and Guidara and Humm hired Brad Cloepfil to design a renovation of Eleven Madison Square. Existing furnishings were to be sold off, and the bar would be refurbished, although furnishings that predated the restaurant's opening were to be retained. Eleven Madison Park was closed for renovation between June and October 2017. Upholstered furniture, rugs, and banquettes were added to the space, which was also repainted in a "neutral color palette". Allied Works designed all of the new furnishings. The artists Rita Ackermann, Daniel Turner, Sol LeWitt, and Olympia Scarry were hired to design art for the restaurant's interior.

Guidara and Humm ended their business relationship in 2019, and Humm became the sole owner of Make it Nice, renaming it Daniel Humm Hospitality in 2024. The restaurant closed again in March 2020 during the COVID-19 pandemic. It was converted into a commissary kitchen to produce meals for food-insecure New Yorkers, in cooperation with the non-profit Rethink Food. There were initial concerns that Eleven Madison Park would not reopen after the pandemic. Humm announced in September 2020 that Eleven Madison Park would reopen after the pandemic, following an agreement with the restaurant's landlord and lenders. In late 2020, Eleven Madison Park began offering dinners for pickup for the first time. Every dinner purchased provides ten meals to New Yorkers experiencing food insecurity via the ongoing partnership with Rethink Food.

Eleven Madison Park reopened in June 2021. In June 2022, Business Insider reported the restaurant struggled with high employee turnover due to low wages and difficult working conditions, including 80-hour weeks. Although workers started at $15 per hour, tipping was banned at the restaurant. Former employees told Insider that there was a significant waste of produce that would be trashed if it was the wrong size or otherwise unused, rather than donated or composted.

== Menu ==
Until the pandemic shutdown, the restaurant offered guests a seasonal tasting menu that drew inspiration from local culture, history, and ingredients. The menu in the dining room consisted of 8–10 courses, and an abbreviated experience at the bar consisted of 5 courses. Both of these menus featured communal elements to enhance the experience. Humm announced in early 2021 that the restaurant would be eliminating all animal products, serving a strictly plant-based menu. According to Humm, he decided upon the change because ingredients such as caviar were increasingly farm-raised and not wild-caught. The restaurant began serving this menu in June 2021.

In August 2025, Eleven Madison Park announced that it will begin serving fish and meat again. Humm stated that the decision was made partially for financial reasons. The restaurant will continue to offer 7 vegan courses, but with optional meat and fish substitutions.

== Books ==
The original Eleven Madison Park Cookbook was published in 2011; Humm and Guidara have released additional cookbooks including I Love New York: Ingredients and Recipes, The NoMad Cookbook, Eleven Madison Park: The Next Chapter, and Eleven Madison Park: The Next Chapter, Revised and Unlimited.

In 2022, Guidara published the book Unreasonable Hospitality: The Remarkable Power of Giving People More Than They Expect, described by Kirkus Reviews as "an enthusiastic guide for leaders". Most of the book describes Guidara's time at Eleven Madison Park.

== Awards ==
- La Liste, the list of the 1,000 best restaurants in the world according to France's Foreign Ministry, ranked Eleven Madison Park 4th in the United States and 241st overall in its inaugural edition of December 2015.
- Relais & Châteaux – Eleven Madison Park designated as Grand Chef, 2008
- The New York Times – Four stars, 2015 and 2009
- James Beard Foundation Award – Outstanding Service, 2016; Outstanding Chef, Daniel Humm, 2012; Outstanding Pastry Chef, Angela Pinkerton, 2011; Outstanding Restaurant, 2011; and Best Chef: New York City, Daniel Humm, 2010
- S. Pellegrino World's 50 Best Restaurants – Ranked #50 in 2010, #24 in 2011, #10 in 2012, #5 in 2013, #4 in 2014, #5 in 2015, #3 in 2016 and #1 in 2017.
- Grand Table du Monde – 2014
- Wine Spectator Grand Award – 2011–2016
- AAA Five Diamond Award – 2012–2025
- Forbes Travel Guide – Five stars, 2010–2014
- Michelin Guide – Three stars, 2012–present. In 2025, the Luxury Travel Book listed Eleven Madison Park as the most-searched Michelin-starred restaurant in the world.
- Zagat – Rating of 28 in food, decor, and service in 2014. This makes it the top-ranked restaurant in the Flatiron District and one of the best restaurants in New York City.

== See also ==
- List of Michelin 3-star restaurants
- List of Michelin 3-star restaurants in the United States
