= Daniel Turner (artist) =

American artist (born 1983)

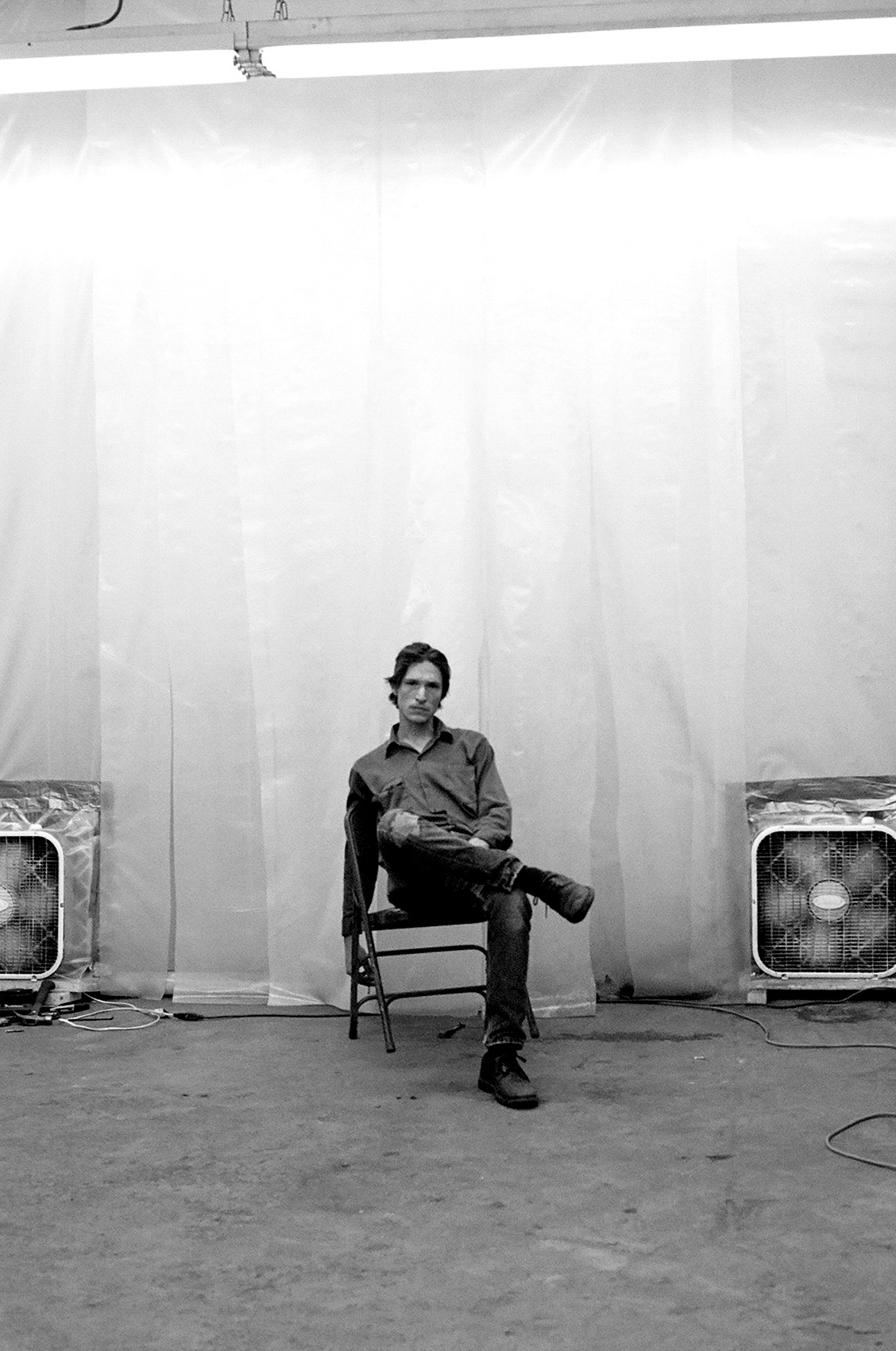
- Born: July 22, 1983 (age 43); Portsmouth, Virginia, US
- Occupation: Artist
- Known for: Sculpture

Daniel Turner (born July 22, 1983) is an American artist. His practice spans a broad range of media including sculpture, photography, video and drawing.

== Early life and work ==
Born in Portsmouth, Virginia, Turner was raised on the state's rural coast, where successive generations of his family worked at the Norfolk Naval Shipyard as welders and in regional hospitals. He studied painting and printmaking at Norfolk State University before receiving a B.F.A. from the San Francisco Art Institute. Turner presented his first institutional solo exhibition at the Old Dominion University Fine Arts Center in 2001. During the early years of his career, he worked in marine salvage, construction, demolition, and as a security guard at the New Museum in New York City. He was hospitalized several times for psychosis, resulting in the action Burning an Entire Body of Work (2006), in which he burned all previous paintings to date.

Since the mid-2000s, Turner has worked primarily in sculpture, developing works from materials recovered from industrial infrastructure and public institutions. Central to Turner's practice is the identification of sites where prolonged operational conditions have physically conditioned the material, forming the basis for its subsequent transformation. His sculptures are often produced through a controlled set of processes in response to a particular institution, material, or site. The resulting sculptures retain a direct material continuity with their sites of origin despite the complete transformation of the source objects. This approach has enabled Turner to base form on transposition, preserving a sensory link to geographical locations, cultural associations, and human contact. Recovered materials are subjected to chemical and mechanical transformation while retaining their material provenance, collapsing distinctions between document, artifact, and sculpture. These elements are present in works where an entire waiting room is cast into a series of solid bars (2013), a former psychiatric facility is burnished to a darkened stain against a wall (2014), or a cafeteria chemically dissolved across the expanse of a floor (2015).

Turner has sourced materials from a range of sites including, American power plants, Japanese chemical tankers, Belgian prisons, and the historic subsea telecommunications cable (TAT-1). In 2019, he extracted one metric ton of hospital beds from The Vinnitsa Regional Psychoneurological Hospital in Vinnitsa Ukraine which were archived, melted and recast into two solid forms. For his solo exhibition at Kunsthalle Basel (2022), Turner extracted elements from three sites in the Basel region that triangulate between architecture, the pharmaceutical industry, and psychology. These materials included several tons of heating radiators and oil tanks which the artist extracted from the interiors of the chemical plant BASF, the pharmaceutical labs of Novartis, and former psychiatric facility Holdenweid. Material excavated from each of the three sites was melted into minimal forms and burnished into the surface of large-scale works on canvas.

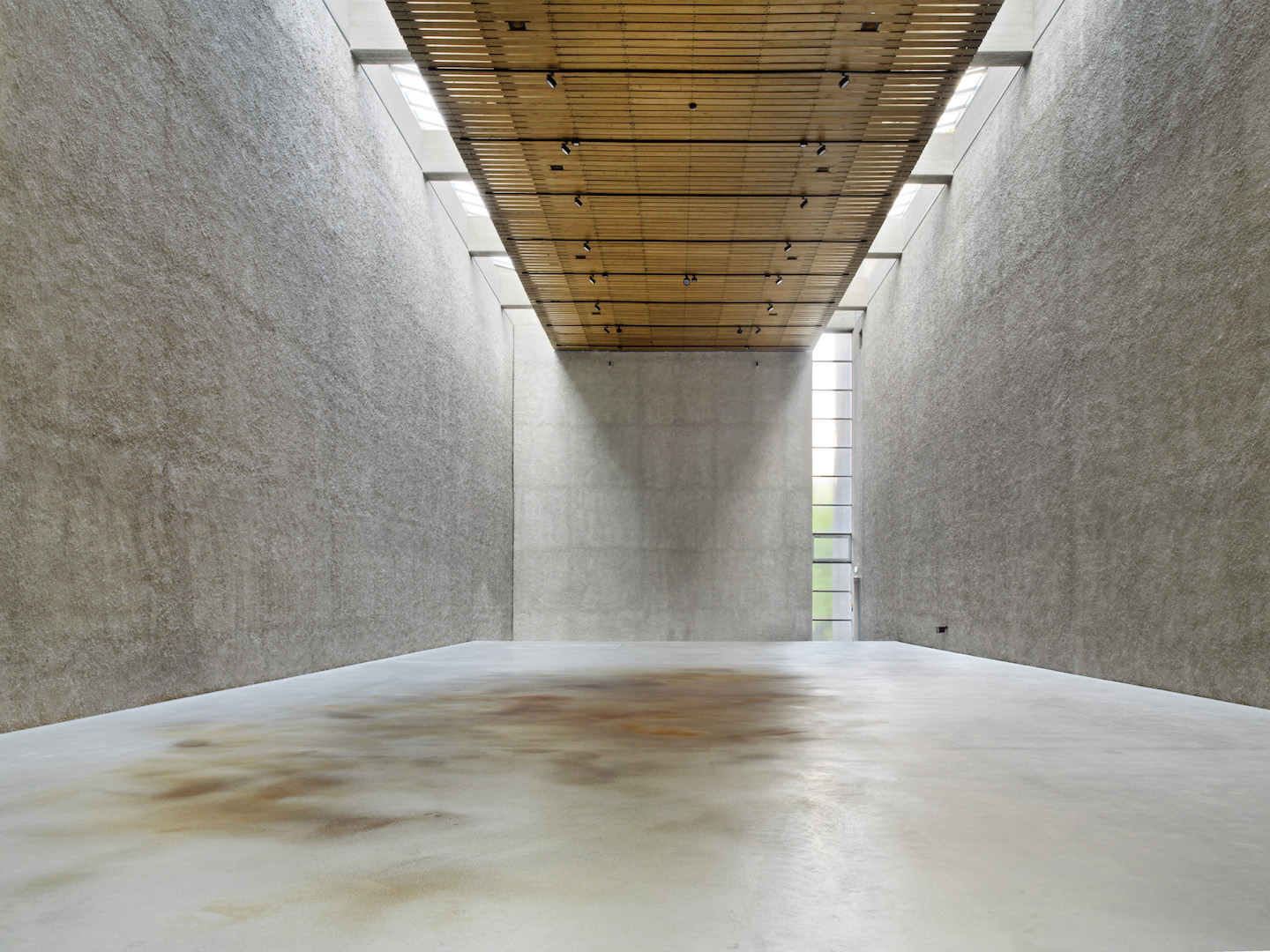
Daniel Turner, Particle Processed Cafeteria, (dissolved cafeteria), steel, fiber, dimensions variable, 2016.

== Selected exhibitions ==
- 'Out of Focus: A New Vision of Art from 1945 to Today', (2025), Musée de l’Orangerie, Paris France
- 'Out of Focus: A New Vision of Art from 1945 to Today', (2025), CaixaForum Madrid
- 'Stories From The Ground', (2025) Museum Dhondt-Dhaenens, Belgium
- ‘Compresseur’, (2024), Musée des Arts Contemporains, Hornu Belgium
- 'Daniel Turner', (2024), Hauser & Wirth, Los Angeles, California
- 'Beware*', (2023), Musée d’art Moderne de la ville de, Paris, France
- ‘Our Ecology’ (2023), Mori Art Museum, Tokyo, Japan
- 'Three Sites, (2022), Kunsthalle Basel, Basel, Switzerland
- Humpty Dumpty, (2022), Palais de Tokyo, Paris, France
- Daniel Turner, (2021), The Maria Leuff Foundation, Columbia County, New York
- Moments Between Events, Anne Appleby, Vija Celmins, On Kawara, Daniel Turner, (2021) Franklin Parrasch Gallery, New York NY
- Like The Wall Awaiting The Ivy, (2021), Musée des Arts Contemporains Grand Hornu, Honru, Belgium
- Recent Acquisitions, (2020), Musée d’art Moderne de la ville de Paris, Paris, France
- Platform: Paris/Brussels, (2020), David Zwirner Gallery, New York NY
- The Extreme Present, (2019) Gagosian Gallery, The Moore Building, Miami, Florida
- Les Abeilles de l'Invisible, (2019), Musée des Arts Contemporains Grand Hornu, Hornu, Belgium
- Parcours, (2019), Art Basel, Basel Switzerland
- Future Generation Art Prize, (2019), Pinchuk Art Center, Kiev Ukraine
- Anne Truitt / Daniel Turner, (2018), Parrasch Heijnen Gallery, Los Angeles, CA
- IPN (2018), Confort Moderne, Poitiers, France
- Daniel Turner, (2018), Galerie Allen, Paris France
- EMP Step, (2017), Eleven Madison Park, New York, NY
- Particle Processed Cafeteria, (2016), König Galerie, St. Agnes Nave, Berlin, Germany
- 110/ 120, (2016), Franklin Parrasch Gallery, New York, NY
- Daniel Turner, (2016), Parrasch Heijnen Gallery, Los Angeles
- Pilage / Fold, (2014), Gagosian Gallery, Paris, France
- Clear, (2014), Gagosian Gallery, Los Angeles, CA
- Freezer Burn, (2014), Hauser & Wirth, New York, NY
- Daniel Turner, (2014) Art Unlimited, Basel Switzerland
- PM, (2014), Team Gallery, New York, NY
- 2 220, (2014), Objectif Exhibitions, Antwerp, Belgium
- John McCracken / Daniel Turner, (2012), Franklin Parrasch Gallery, New York, NY
- Daniel Turner, (2012), White Cube, London, England
- New York: Directions, Points of Interest, (2012), Massimo De Carlo, Milan, Italy
- Modern Talking, (2012), Muzeul National de Arta din Cluj-Napoca, Cluj, Romania
- Daniel Turner, (2012), The Journal Gallery, Brooklyn NY
- Painting Overall, (2011), The Prague Biennale 5, Prague Czech Republic
- Four Rooms, (2011), The Centre for Contemporary Art Ujazdowski Castle, Warsaw, Poland
- Perfect Man II, (2011), White Columns, New York, NY

== Public Collections ==
- Centre Pompidou, Paris, France
- Kunst Museum, Basel, Switzerland
- Kunsthalle Basel, Basel Switzerland
- The Stedelijk Museum voor Actuele Kunst, Ghent, Belgium
- Musée d'art Moderne de la ville de Paris, France
- The Museum of Contemporary Art San Diego, California
- FRAC Bretagne Fond Régional d'art Contemporain, France
- ICA Institute of Contemporary Art Miami, Florida
- Sammlung Hauser & Wirth, Henau, Switzerland
- Mona, Tasmania, Australia
- FRAC Ile-de-France, France
- The Maria Leuff Foundation, New York
- Musée des Arts Contemporains Grand Hornu, Hornu, Belgium

== Monographs ==
- Compresseur, essay by Denis Gielen, published by Musée des Arts Contemporains Grand Hornu
- Daniel Turner, published by The Maria Leuff Foundation
- Daniel Turner, essay by Elena Filipovic, published by The Borlem Prize
- Three Movements (Bronze), essay by Roberto Toscano, Jack Self, Brad Wearstler, published by Karma Books
- 5150, essay by Jeffrey Grunthaner, published by American Art Catalogues
- Marjorie, published by Etudes Books
- 2 220, published by Karma Books
- Daniel Turner, essay by Franciska Zolyom, published by White Cube Gallery
- Daniel Turner, essay by Jeffrey Grunthaner, published by Franklin Parrasch Gallery

== Personal life ==
Turner is married to fellow artist Rita Ackermann,. He lives and works between New York City and Columbia County, New York.
