= Rita Ackermann =

Hungarian-American artist (born 1968)

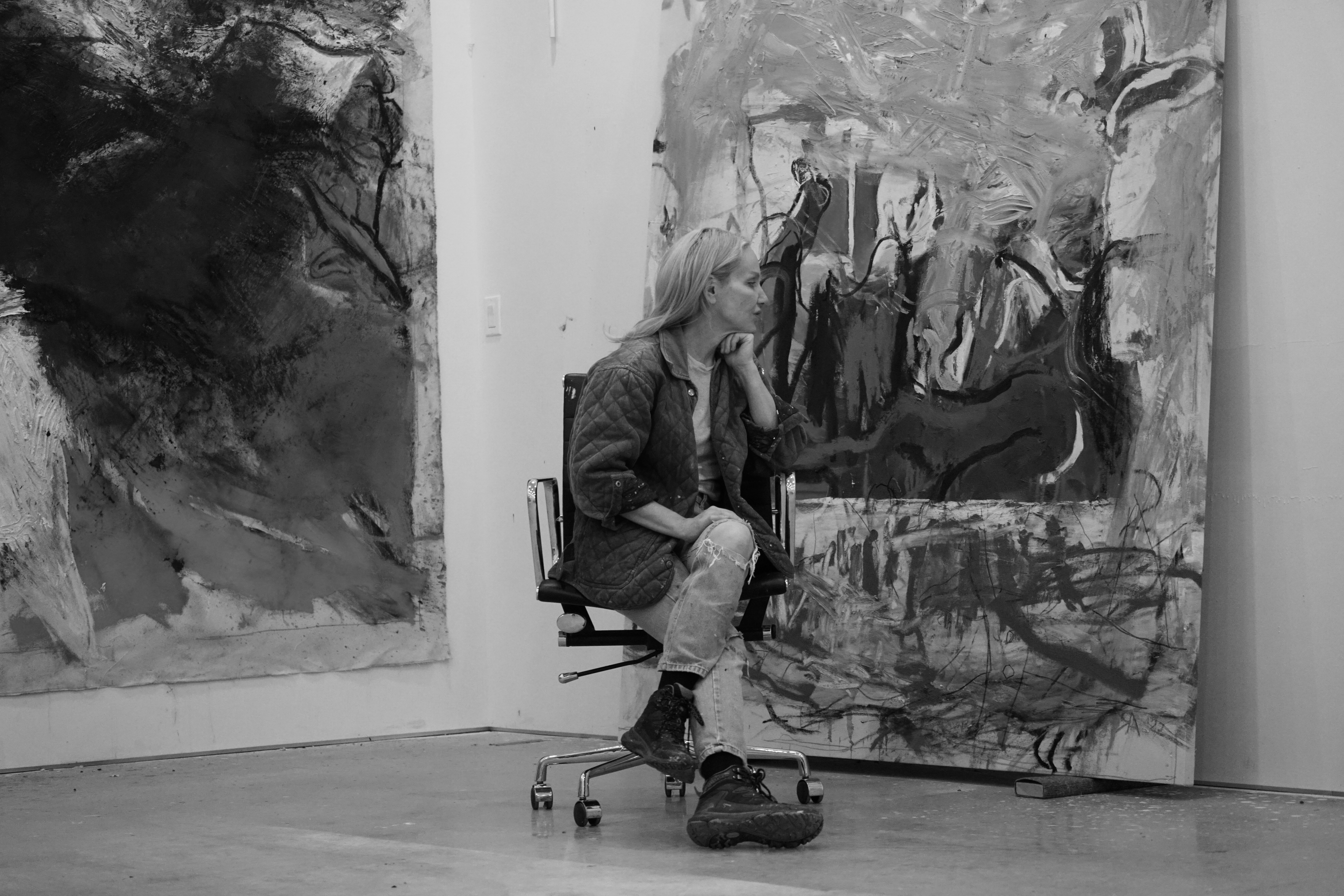
- Ackermann, photo by Daniel Turner
- Born: Bakos Rita; April 19, 1968 (age 58); Budapest, Hungary
- Education: University of Fine Arts Budapest New York Studio School of Drawing, Painting and Sculpture
- Known for: Painting
- Notable work: Get a Job, 1993, Wiped out Heroines, 2014, Mama, 2018.
- Movement: Abstract Expressionism

Rita Ackermann (born April 19, 1968) is a Hungarian-born American artist recognized for her abstract paintings that incorporate human forms, primarily focusing on themes of anthropomorphism and femininity. Her works, often depicting women and allusions to fairy tales, explore the nuances of adolescent disinterest using a unique and expressive style of brushwork. She lives in New York City.

== Early life ==
Ackermann was born in Budapest. Ackermann studied at the University of Fine Arts Budapest from 1989 until 1992, where she studied with the painter Károly Klimó. In 1992, Ackermann moved to New York City to study at The New York Studio School of Drawing, Painting and Sculpture through the Hanes Family Foundation. Upon arriving in New York, the artist, who was originally “Rita Bakos,” changed her name to “Rita Ackermann,” her grandmother's maiden name.

== Career ==
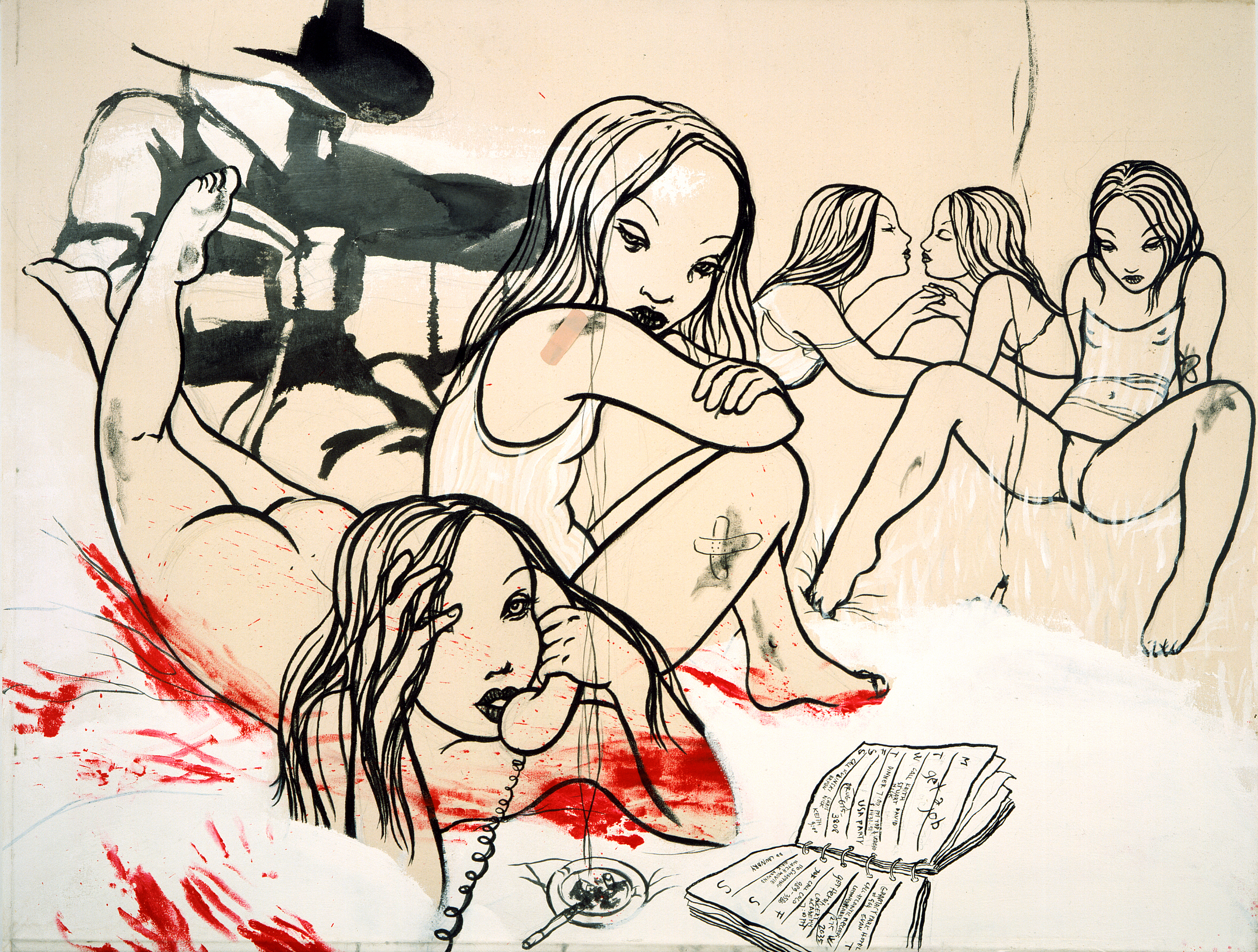
Rita Ackermann, "Get a Job," 1993

In 1994, Ackermann was commissioned by The New Museum to create a faux stained-glass window titled Who Are We? Where Did We Come From?. That same year, she had her first solo exhibition at Andrea Rosen Gallery in New York City which was reviewed in Artforum by critic Keith Seward. In 1999, Ackermann mounted her first institutional exhibition at The Swiss Institute in New York. In 2002, she had a solo exhibition of paintings, collage and works on paper titled Snowfall in August at Museum Het Domein in the Netherlands. From 2006 to 2008 Ackermann worked exclusively in collage, resulting in a series of works she compressed between two vertical sheets of Plexiglas. Ackermann participated in the 2008 Whitney Biennial. In 2011 her collaboration with filmmaker Harmony Korine titled, “Shadow Fux” was exhibited at The Swiss Institute in New York City. Ackermann received her first major survey exhibition in 2011 titled, "BAKOS," at the Ludwig Museum of Contemporary Art in Budapest.

In 2012, Ackermann was the subject of a mid-career retrospective at Museum of Contemporary Art, North Miami, curated by Bonnie Clearwater. The exhibition featured paintings, drawings, and collages from 1993 to 2012. In 2014, the Sammlung Friedrichshof in Austria held an exhibition titled, "Meditation on Violence” by Ackermann, which focused on a series of ‘chalkboard paintings’ which were the result of experimenting with pushing the boundaries of painting. A survey of the artist's ‘chalkboard paintings’ was held in 2016 at Malmö Konsthall in Sweden titled, “The Aesthetic of Disappearance”. An additional survey of Ackermann's works in chalk titled, “Movements as Monuments” was held in 2018 at La Triennale di Milano. In 2019, Ackermann began to work on her Mama series, which she has continued through today. A series of “Mama” paintings will be shown alongside her earliest drawings and paintings created from 1993 to 1996, in an exhibition titled "HIDDEN" at MASI Lugano in March 2023.

== Personal life ==
Rita Ackermann is married to artist Daniel Turner.

== Publications ==
- Kort, Pamela, Grau, Donatien, Bezzola, Tobia (et al.), 'Rita Ackermann. Hidden', Milan: Mousse, Lugano: Museo d'arte della Svizzera italiana, 2023 (forthcoming)
- Jetzer, Gianni, Korine, Harmony, 'Rita Ackermann: Mama', Zurich: Hauser & Wirth Publishers, 2021
- Clearwater, Bonnie, Ensslin, Felix (et al.), 'Rita Ackermann', New York: Skira Rizzoli, 2011
- Orui, Makoto (ed.), 'Rita Ackermann. Keep my mouth shut and no headaches... Works 1996-1993', New York: Andrew Rosen Gallery, Tokyo: rockin’ on inc., 1997
- Ackermann, Rita, 'Sketchbook V (Twitchy)', New York: American Art Catalogues, 2022
- Ackermann, Rita, 'Sketchbook IV (Frequencies of Freedom (Double Take)', New York: American Art Catalogues, 2022
- Ackermann, Rita, 'Sketchbook III (7581)', New York: American Art Catalogues, 2022
- Ackermann, Rita, 'Sketchbook II (A Midsummer Night's Dream)', New York: American Art Catalogues, 2021
- Ackermann, Rita, 'Sketchbook I (For Mama)', New York: American Art Catalogues, 2021
- Ackermann, Rita, 'drawings',: Karma Publications, 2017
- Ackermann, Rita, 'Meditation on Violence": Schlebrugge.Editor, 2016
- ‘Rita Ackermann and Harmony Korine. Shadow Fux’, Rita Ackermann with Harmony Korine, New York: Swiss Institute of Contemporary Art, 2011
- 'Snowfall in August', Sittard: Museum Het Domein, 2002
- 'Revelations', Rita Ackermann (art) with Byron Coley (story), Tokyo: Rockin' On, 1999

== Solo exhibitions ==
- 2023, MASI Lugano, 'Rita Ackermann. Hidden', Lugano, Switzerland
- 2016, Malmö Konsthall, 'The Aesthetic of Disappearance', Malmö, Sweden
- 2010, Swiss Institute Contemporary Art New York, ‘Rita Ackermann and Harmony Korine: Shadow Fux’, New York City, New York

== Public collections ==
- Dallas Museum of Art, Dallas, Texas
- Denver Art Museum, Logan Collection, Denver, Colorado
- The Long Museum, West Bund, China
- The Maria Leuff Foundation, Columbia County, New York
- Marieluise Hessel Foundation, Bard College, New York City, New York
- Museum het Domein, Sittard, Netherlands
- Museum of Contemporary Art North Miami, Miami, Florida
- Museum of Contemporary Art, Los Angeles, California
- Museum of Modern Art, New York City, New York
- San Francisco Museum of Modern Art, San Francisco, California
- Ståhl Collection, Norrköping, Sweden
- The Zabludowicz Collection, London, United Kingdom
