= Gaston Suisse =

French artist (1896–1988)

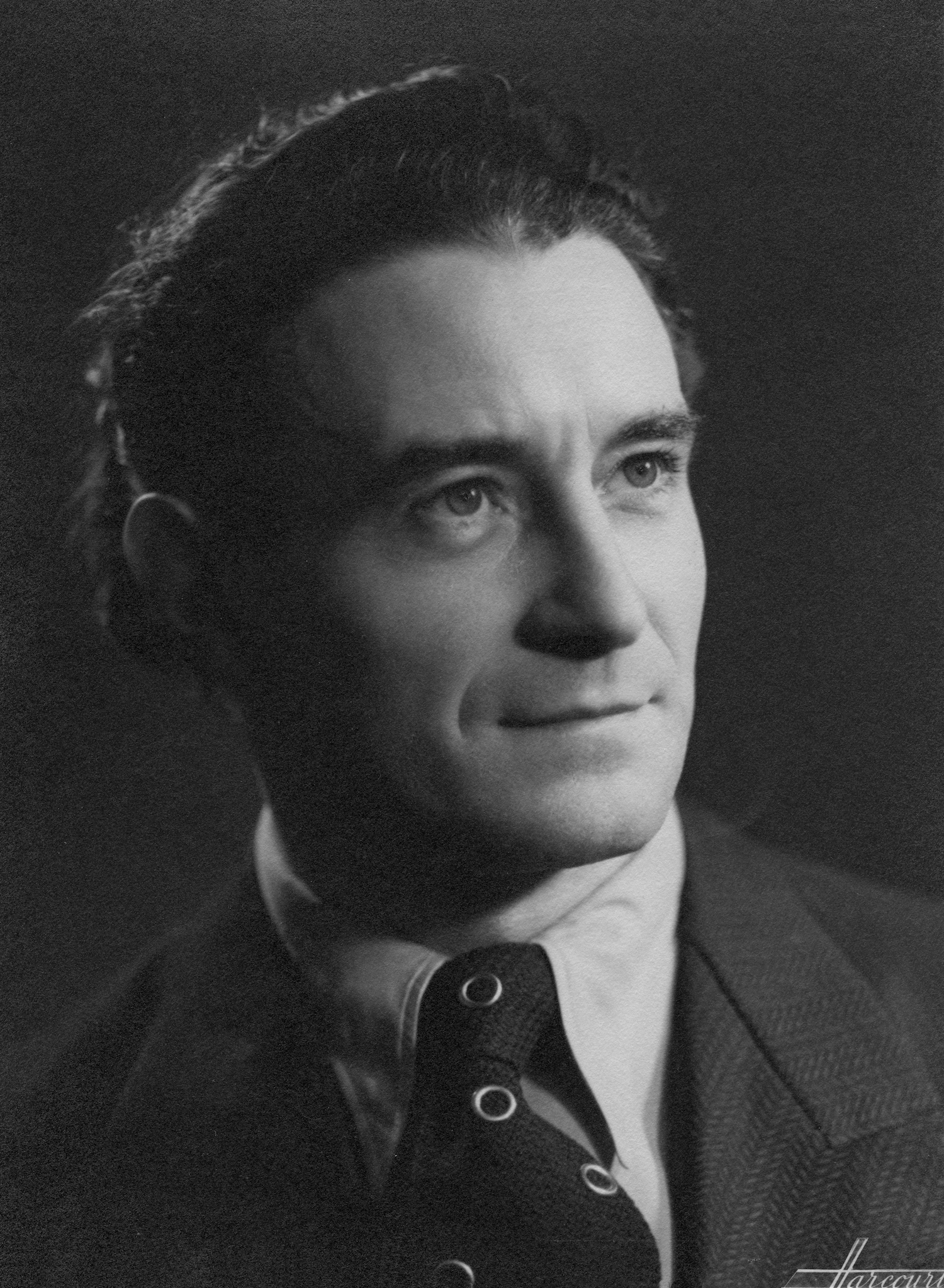
- Born: December 1, 1896; Paris, France
- Died: March 7, 1988 (aged 91)
- Movement: Art Deco, Animal
- Website: www.gastonsuisse.com

Gaston Suisse (December 1, 1896 – March 7, 1988) was a French artist designer, painter, lacquerer, and decorator. Gaston Suisse, "is a major artist of Art Deco".

== Presentation ==
Founding artist of what will be called the Art Deco Period, Gaston Suisse along with his production of furniture, decorative panels and lacquer objects, participated in major international exhibitions at the beginning of the 20th century: Exposition internationale des Arts décoratifs et industriels modernes in 1925, Exposition Coloniale International 1931, Exposition Internationale des Arts et Techniques 1937.

He exhibited at the Salon of French animal artists, and participated each year in the exhibitions with the group of animalists. His works were then exhibited at the Cité Internationale des Arts in Paris in 1971, the Vernon museum devoted a retrospective to him in 2000. For its centenary in 2004, the Dallas Museum of Art organized an exhibition entitled "Passion for Art, 100 treasures, 100 years". A three-door lacquer cabinet with bird decoration by Gaston Suisse was exhibited, among the hundred masterpieces chosen from the museum's collections, at the Museum of Fine Arts in Reims, exhibition: "Roaring Twenties, Years of Order, the Art Deco of Reims in New York" in 2007, the City of Architecture and Heritage of Paris during the exhibition "When art deco seduces the world", in October 2013 to March 2014, exhibited a lacquer panel and a screen.

His works can be found in museums in Boulogne-Billancourt, Dallas, Le Havre, Luxembourg, Paris, Roubaix, Vernon

== Some works ==
Gaston Suisse has produced many objects in lacquer: furniture, screens, panels, boxes, boxes and screens.

Animal artist, he drew many sketches during his travels in the Maghreb and in the zoos of Europe which he used as studies for the realization of his compositions.

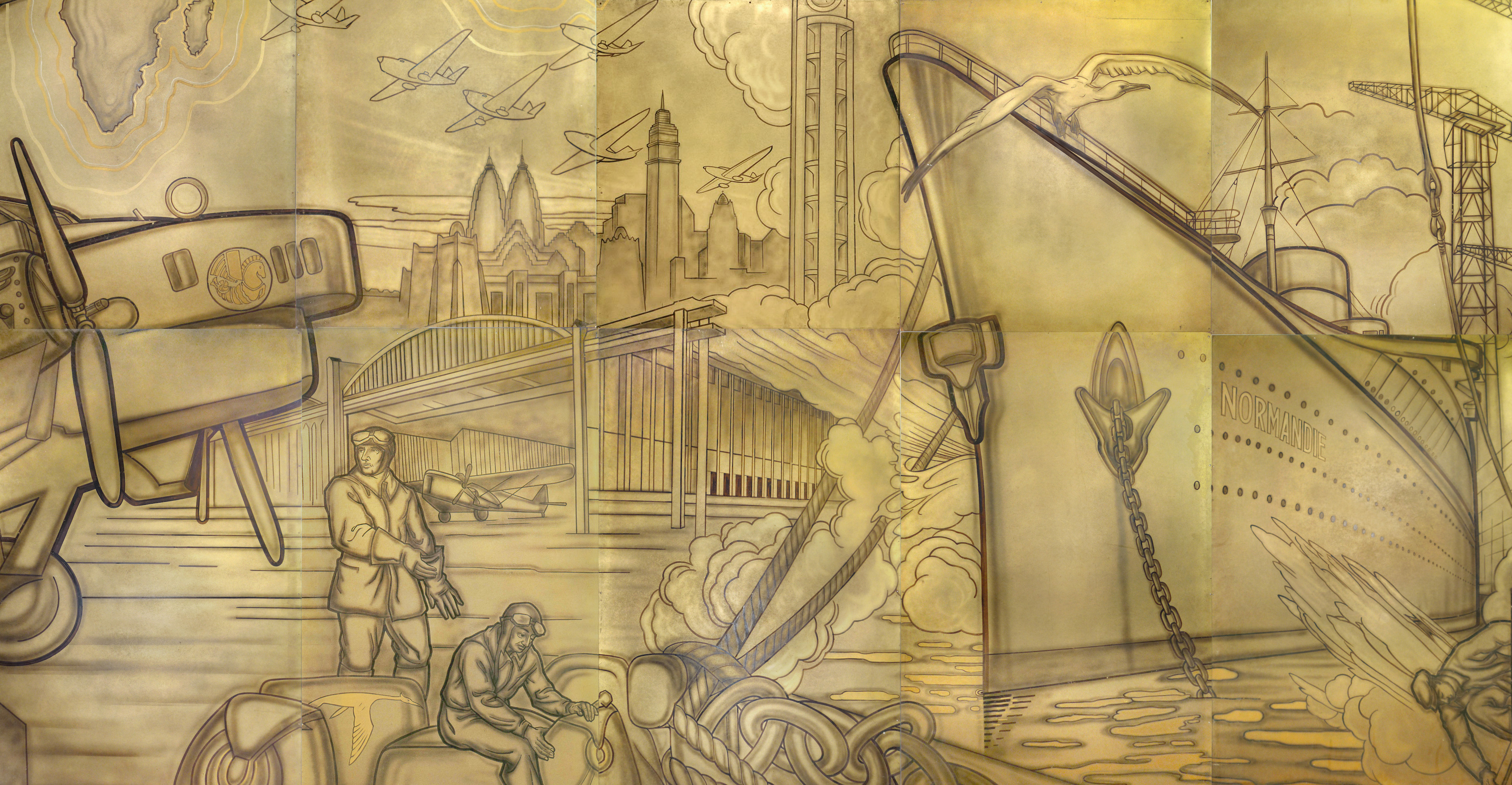
Normandie et aviateur, Exposition Internationale Paris 1937. Musée d'Art Moderne Paris

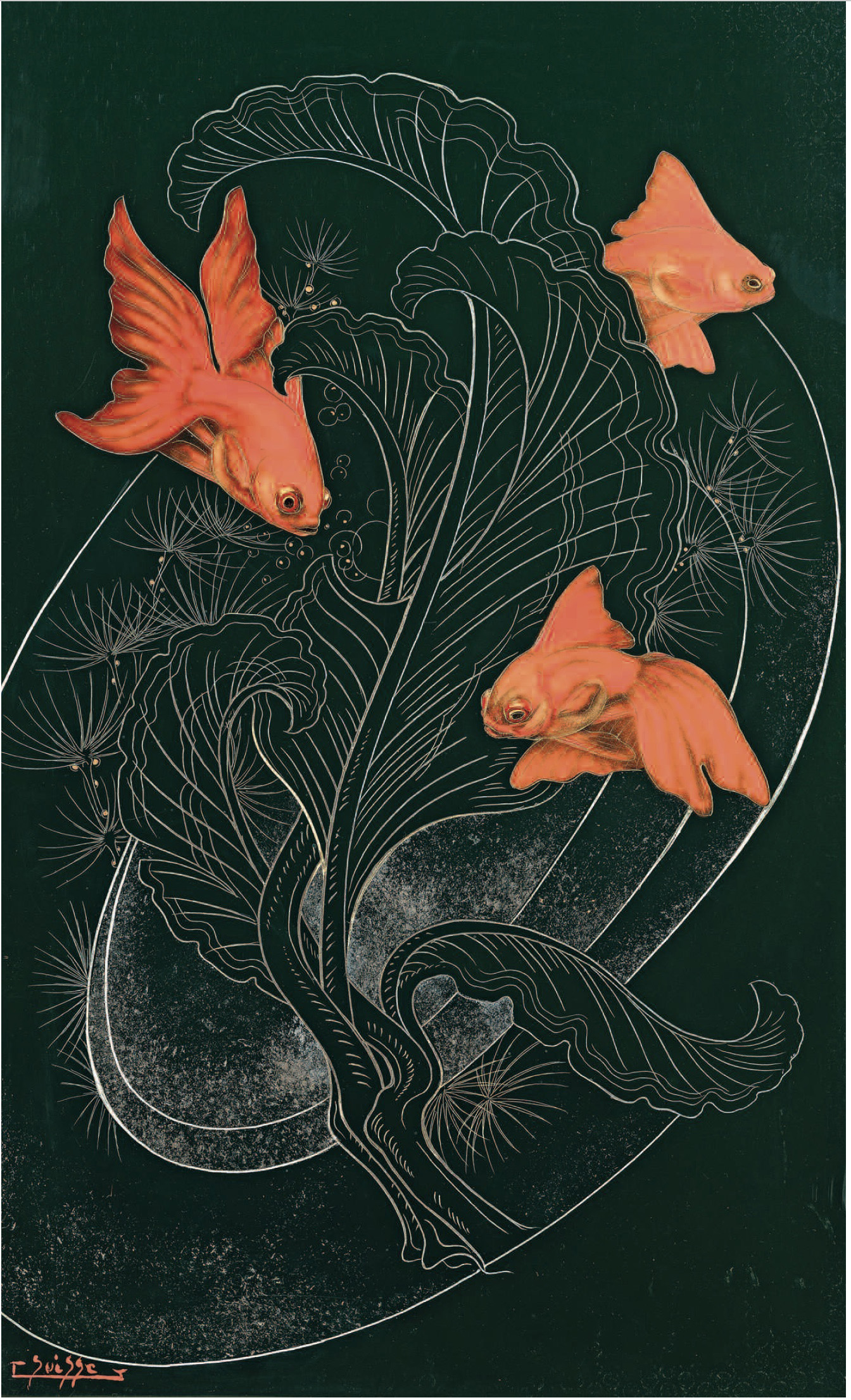
Poissons japonais et gorgone

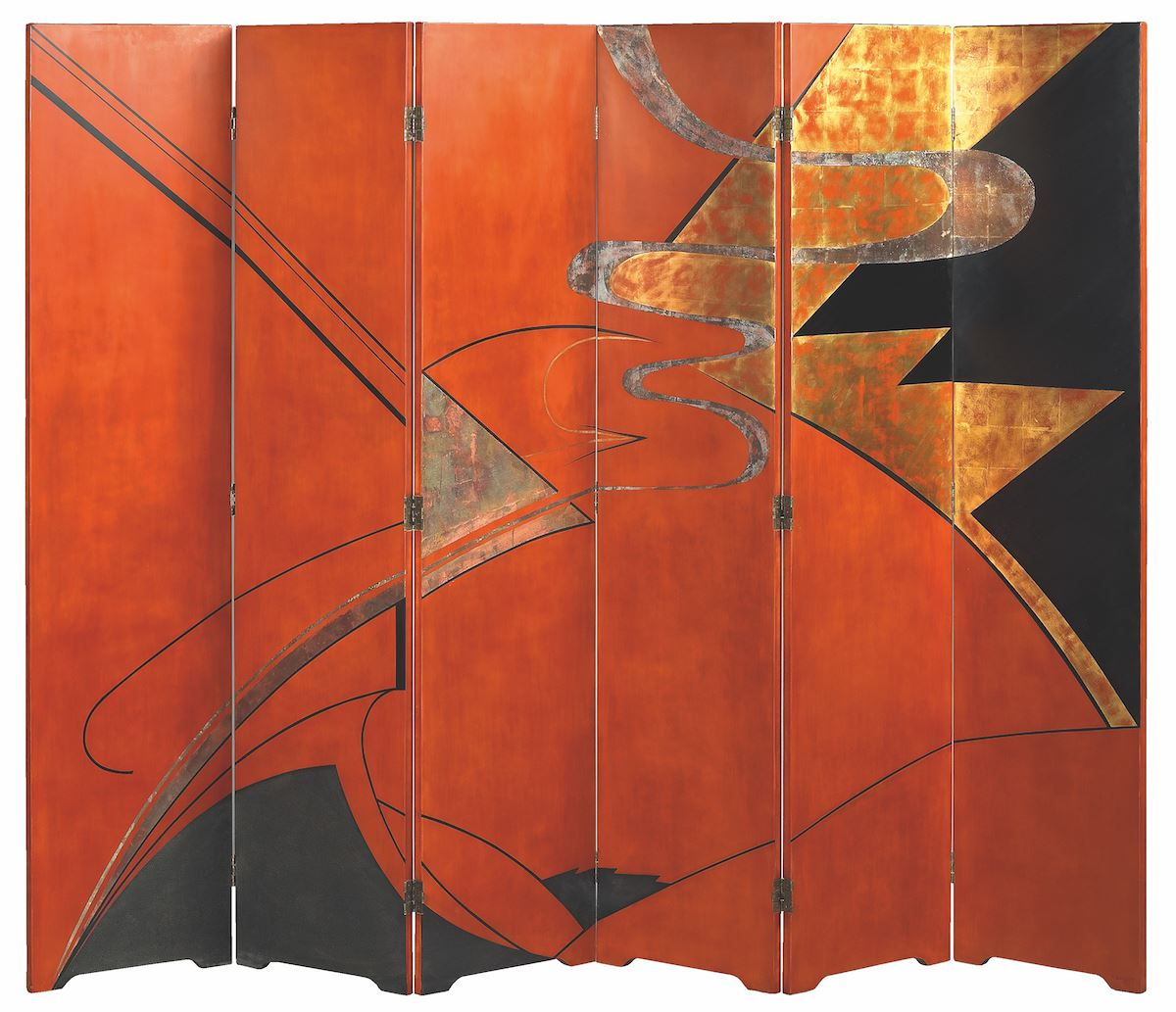
Paravent Vague, 1925

== Bibliography ==
- Yvonne Brunhammer et Suzanne Tise, Les Artistes Décorateurs 1900–1942, Edition Flammarion, Paris 1990, ISBN 9782080109194
- Bangert Fahr, Lackpannel Art Déco, Edition Heine 1993.
- Jean Pierre Chalon, Christian Meissirel, Gaston Suisse, Catalogue de l'exposition Gaston Suisse, Meissirel Fine Art Paris 1995
- Emmanuel Bréon et Michéle Lefrançois, Le Musée des Années 30, Edition Somogy 1998, ISBN 285056978X
- Sophie Fourny-Dargère, Gaston Suisse, le bestiaire, Éditions Musée de Vernon, 2000 ISBN 2-907517-23-6
- Catalogue du Musée d'Art et d'Industrie de Roubaix, Les animaliers du XX siècle, Collectif d'auteurs, Edition SCZ 2001, ISBN 2754101209
- Marion Vidal-Bué, L'Algérie des peintres - 1830–1960, Editions Paris Méditerranée, juillet 2002, ISBN 2-84272-143-8
- Marion Vidal-Bué, L'Algérie du Sud et ses peintres, Editions Paris Méditerranée, février 2003, ISBN 978-2842721756
- Années folles, Années d'ordre, l'Art déco de Reims à New-York, Collectif d'auteurs, Editions Hazan, octobre 2006 ISBN 2754101209
- Christian Eludut, Le monde animal dans l'art décoratif des années 30, Éditions BGO, 2007 ISBN 978-2-9529802-0-3
- Alastair Duncan, ART DECO, Encyclopédie des arts décoratifs des années vingt et trente, Éditions Citadelles & Mazenod, 2010 ISBN 978-2-85088-30-1-9
- Dominique Gagneux, Musée d'Art Moderne, Collection ART DECO, Paris Musée, Les collections de la ville de Paris 2012 ISBN 978-2-7596-0188-2
- 1925 Quand l'art déco séduit le monde. Catalogue de l'exposition, cité de l'architecture, Paris, Collectif d'auteurs, Éditions Norma. Paris 2013, ISBN 978-2-9155-4258-5
- Exposition Gaston Suisse, Edition Galerie Félix Marcilhac, 2013
- Emmanuel Bréon, GASTON SUISSE: Splendeur du laque Art Déco, Éditeur Somogy éditions d'art, 2013 ISBN 978-2757206362
- Rodney and Diana Capstick-Dale, Art Deco Collectibles, fashionable objets from the jazz age, Thames & Hudson, 2016 ISBN 0500518319
- Pierre Dumonteil, Gaston Suisse, l'art du laque, trilingue. Français, Anglais, mandarin, Dumonteil éditions, 2017,ISBN 978-2-7572-0636-2
- Giulia Pentcheff, Gaston Suisse, l'art du laque, Édition galerie Pentcheff, mai 2020, ISBN 9791094462096
- Juliette Singer, Histoire des musées de Paris, Édition Paris-Musées, 2017,ISBN 9782759603756
- Malgorzata Nowara, Art Deco au Luxembourg, Publication Musée National d’histoire et d’art Luxembourg, 2021,ISBN 978-2-87985-521-9
- Collective of authors (2021). l’Art Déco France Amérique du Nord (in French). Paris: Editions Norma. pp. 117, 263. ISBN 978-2376660385
