= Danny Meyer =

American restaurateur and writer (born 1958)

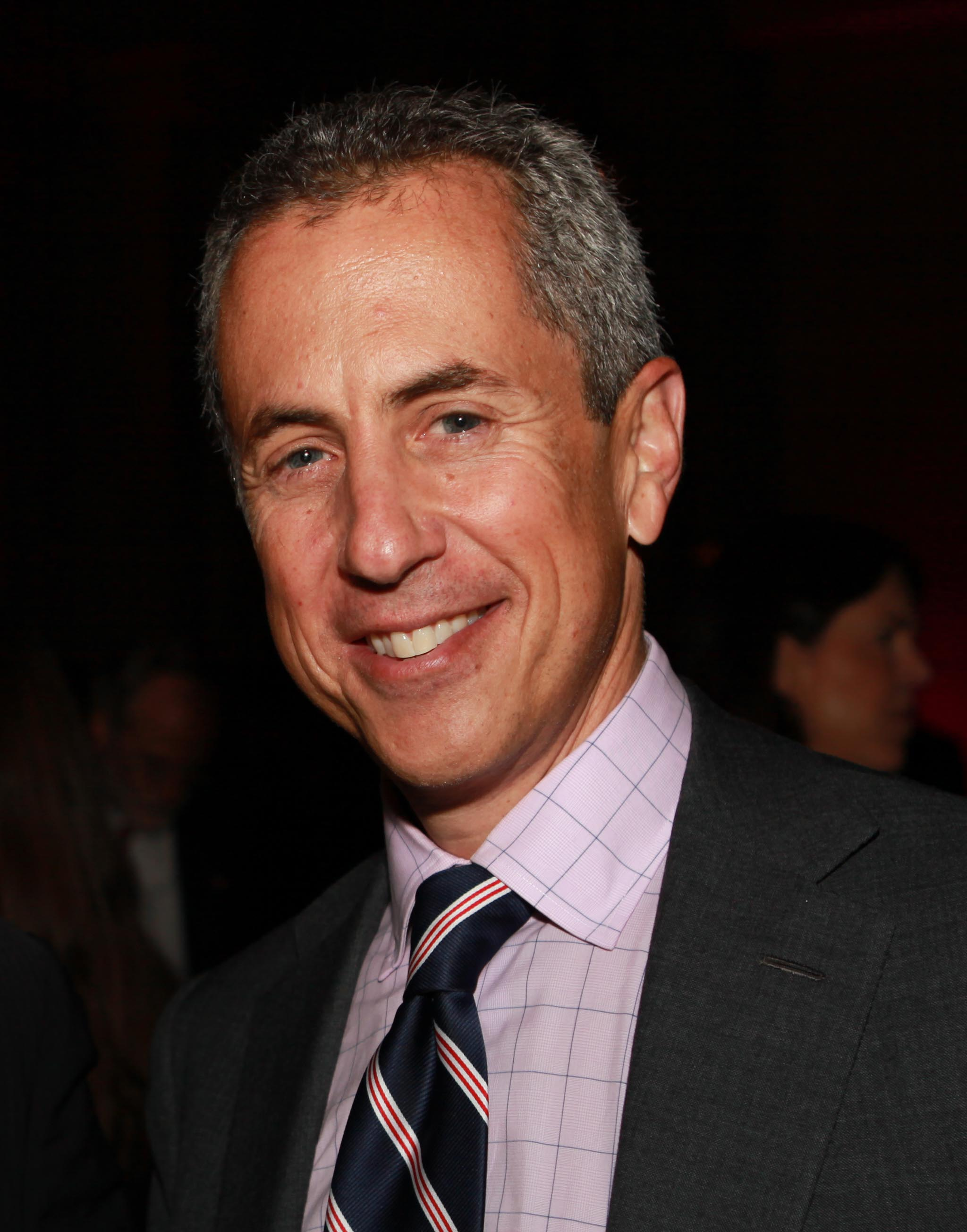
- Meyer in 2010
- Born: March 14, 1958 (age 68); St. Louis, Missouri, U.S.
- Education: Trinity College, Hartford
- Occupation: Restaurateur
- Spouse: Audrey Rayelyn Heffernan
- Website: ushg.com (his business)

Daniel Meyer (born March 14, 1958) is a New York City restaurateur and the founder and executive chairman of the Union Square Hospitality Group (USHG).

== Early life ==
Meyer was born and raised in a reform Jewish family in St. Louis, Missouri the son of Roxanne (née Harris) and Morton L. Meyer. His father was the president of a travel, hospitality and real estate company in St. Louis. His grandfather was Chicago businessman and philanthropist, Irving B. Harris.

He attended John Burroughs School and as a child, Meyer attended Camp Nebagamon for boys in Lake Nebagamon, Wisconsin. During college, Meyer worked for his father as a tour guide in Rome and then returned there to study international politics. Meyer was a Brother of the Alpha Delta Phi fraternity while at Trinity College in Hartford, Connecticut, where he graduated in 1980 with a degree in political science.

== Career ==
Meyer worked in Chicago as Cook County field director for John Anderson's 1980 independent presidential campaign.

He gained his first restaurant experience in 1984 as an assistant manager at Pesca, an Italian seafood restaurant in the Flatiron District of New York City. He then returned to Europe to study cooking as a culinary stagiaire in Italy and Bordeaux, France.

In 1985, at age 27, Meyer opened his first restaurant, Union Square Cafe. Meyer's other restaurants and businesses include Gramercy Tavern, Blue Smoke, Jazz Standard, Shake Shack, Daily Provisions, Ci Siamo, The Modern, Cafe 2 and Terrace 5 at MoMA, Maialino (formerly at the Gramercy Park Hotel), Untitled at the North End Grill, Marta, Porchlight, GreenRiver, Union Square Events, and Hospitality Quotient. Union Square Events, USHG's catering division, operates several concessions at major sports facilities including Citi Field, Saratoga Race Course, and Nationals Park.

In 2010, Meyer suffered his first restaurant closure, Tabla. In a statement, Meyer blamed the closure on the specificity of the Indian cuisine offered by the restaurant. That same year, Meyer participated in a documentary called "The Restaurateur".

In late 2011, Union Square Hospitality group sold Eleven Madison Park to its chef Daniel Humm and front-of-house director Will Guidara. In 2018, North End Grill closed.

In 2015, Meyer announced that he would eliminate tipping at all of his restaurants. The move increased prices by approximately 21 percent and led to large portions of his staff leaving the company.

=== COVID-19 response and Paycheck Protection Program relief ===
As COVID-19 swept through the United States, Meyer shuttered all his restaurants, criticized other businesses for opening, and stated that he did not expect to offer full service until a vaccine was available. In a May 1 Vanity Fair podcast, Meyer explained that taking a Paycheck Protection Program loan, intended to help small businesses, "could be the most irresponsible thing in the world for a restaurant to do." In July, it emerged that twelve separate Meyer restaurants received loans. Meyer's company, Union Square Hospitality Group, received between $11.4 and $27 million in PPP loans. Shake Shack earlier claimed to return its PPP assistance following media attention."

=== Writings ===
Meyer co-wrote The Union Square Cafe Cookbook (HarperCollins, 1994) with his business partner, Chef Michael Romano. The book earned the IACP Julia Child Award for the best new cookbook by a first-time author, and was followed up with the highly acclaimed Second Helpings from Union Square Cafe (HarperCollins, 2001). Meyer also wrote The New York Times bestseller Setting the Table (HarperCollins, 2006), which examines the power of hospitality in restaurants, business, and life. In May 2009, Meyer's restaurants released a cocktail cookbook, Mix Shake Stir (Little, Brown) featuring 140 recipes, along with tips, anecdotes and photography.

=== Community activism ===
Meyer has served on the boards of Share Our Strength and City Harvest. In addition, he served as co-chair of the Union Square Partnership for five years, and as an executive committee member for NYC & Co and the Madison Square Park Conservancy.

== Ratings and reviews ==
Four of USHG's restaurants have earned three stars from The New York Times; Eleven Madison Park was upgraded to four stars in 2009. USHG's restaurants routinely appear among the Most Popular in New York City according to the Zagat guide, including Union Square Cafe, which has held the #1 spot nine times. Eleven Madison Park held three Michelin Stars, The Modern earned its second Michelin Star in 2015, Gramercy Tavern holds one Michelin Star, and GreenRiver was awarded one Michelin Star in 2016. In 2016, The Modern was awarded a Wine Spectator Grand Award in 2016.

=== Awards ===
Meyer and USHG have won 28 James Beard Foundation Awards.

- 2018 Workplace Legacy Award
- 2017 Julia Child Award from The Julia Child Foundation for Gastronomy and the Culinary Arts
- 2013 Pennsylvania State University School of Hospitality Management Conti Professor, Fall Semester

== Podcast appearances ==
Meyer was interviewed by Reid Hoffman on the Masters of Scale podcast, where he talked about how he ignored conventional wisdom to revolutionize the restaurant industry. He appeared on The Ringer's House of Carbs Podcast, where he presented his Washington D.C. establishment "Maialino Mare" and talked about his career in hospitality. Danny Meyer most recently appeared on The Knowledge Project Podcast to discuss the intersection between hospitality and humanity, and why we’re all invested in the hospitality business. He talked food, love and business on the Gary Vee Audio Experience Podcast.

== Book reviews ==
- The Union Square Cafe Cookbook was described in the New York Journal of Books as "...expertly adapted for home use and offers many dishes worth trying and adding to your repertoire."

== Personal life ==
In 1988, Meyer married Audrey Rayelyn Heffernan in an interfaith Roman Catholic and Jewish service at Unitarian Church of All Souls in Manhattan. He has a daughter, Hallie Meyer, who founded Caffè Panna, an ice cream shop in New York City.
