= Jon Favreau filmography =

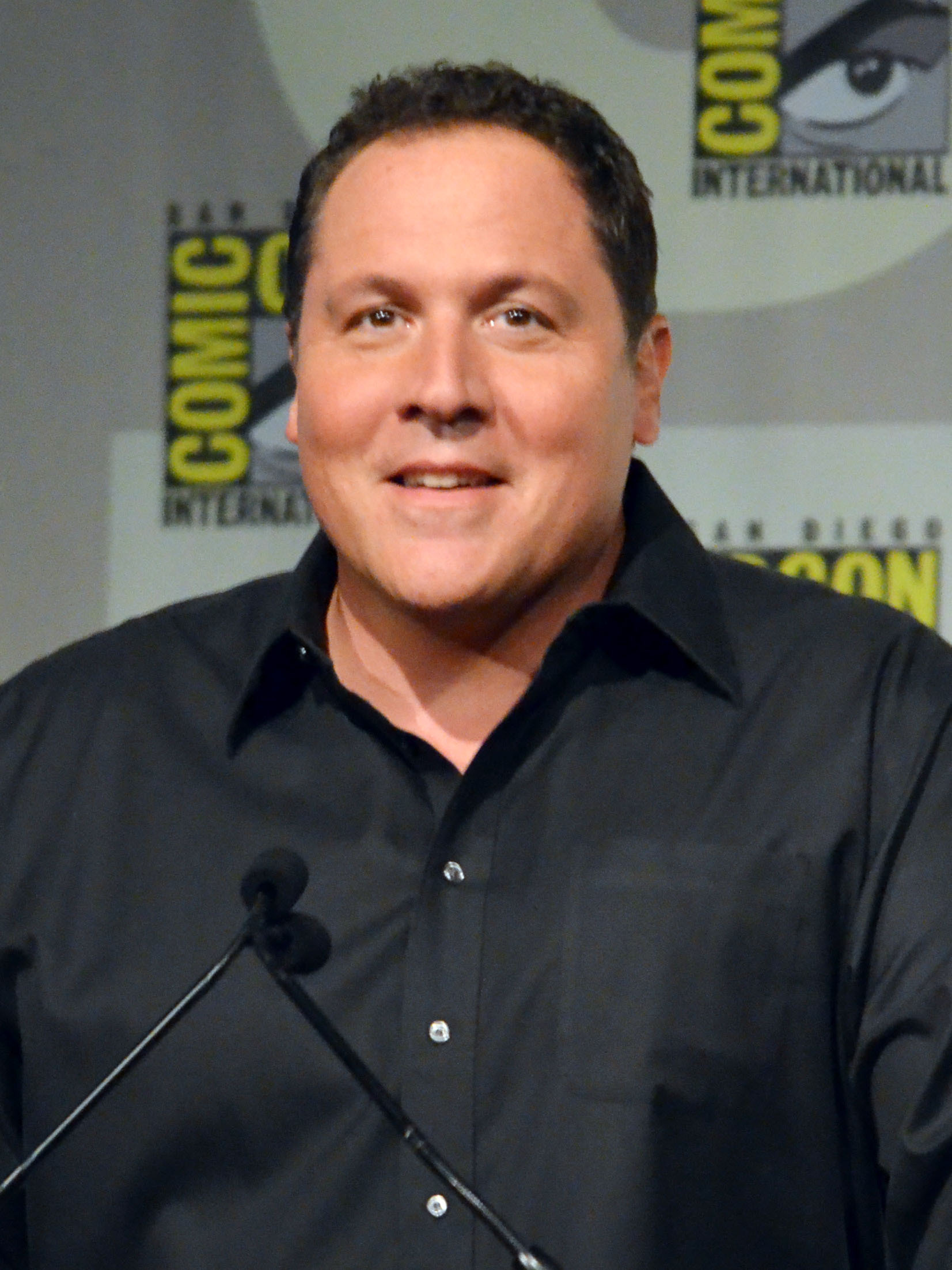
Favreau at the 2012 San Diego Comic-Con

The following list is the complete filmography of the American actor, director, producer, and screenwriter Jon Favreau.

== Acting credits ==
=== Film ===
Year	Title	Role	Notes	Refs.
1992	Folks!	Chicago Taxi Driver		
1992	Hoffa	Extra		
1993	Rudy	D-Bob		
1994	PCU	Gutter		
1994	Mrs. Parker and the Vicious Circle	Elmer Rice		
1994	Speechless	Debate Control Room Operator		
1995	Batman Forever	Assistant		
1996	Swingers	Mike Peters		
1996	Persons Unknown	Terry		
1998	Deep Impact	Dr. Gus Partenza		
1998	Very Bad Things	Kyle Fisher		
1999	Rocky Marciano	Rocky Marciano		
2000	Love & Sex	Adam Levy		
2000	The Replacements	Daniel "Danny" Bateman		
2001	Made	Bobby Ricigliano		
2003	Daredevil	Franklin "Foggy" Nelson		
2003	The Big Empty	John Person		
2003	Elf	Doctor Ben / Mr. Narwhal (uncredited voice)		
2003	Something's Gotta Give	Leo		
2004	Wimbledon	Ron Roth		
2006	The Break-Up	Johnny O		
2006	Open Season	Reilly (voice)		
2008	Iron Man	Harold "Happy" Hogan		
2008	Four Christmases	Denver McVie		
2009	I Love You, Man	Barry		
2009	G-Force	Hurley the Guinea Pig (voice)		
2009	Couples Retreat	Joey Tanzini		
2010	Iron Man 2	Harold "Happy" Hogan		
2011	Zookeeper	Jerome the Bear (voice)		
2012	John Carter	Thark Bookie (voice)		
2012	People Like Us	Richards		
2013	Identity Thief	Harold Cornish		
2013	Iron Man 3	Harold "Happy" Hogan		
2013	The Wolf of Wall Street	Manny Riskin		
2014	Chef	Carl Casper		
2015	Entourage	Himself		
2016	The Jungle Book	Pygmy Hog (voice)		
2016	Term Life	Jimmy Lincoln		
2017	Spider-Man: Homecoming	Harold "Happy" Hogan		
2018	Avengers: Infinity War	Harold "Happy" Hogan	Deleted scene	
2018	Solo: A Star Wars Story	Rio Durant (voice)		
2019	Avengers: Endgame	Harold "Happy" Hogan		
2019	Spider-Man: Far From Home	Harold "Happy" Hogan		
2021	Spider-Man: No Way Home	Harold "Happy" Hogan		
2024	Deadpool & Wolverine	Harold "Happy" Hogan		
2026	Avengers Endgame: Encore	Harold "Happy" Hogan		

=== Television ===
Year	Title	Role	Notes	Refs.
1994	Seinfeld	Eric the Clown	Episode: "The Fire"	
1995	The Larry Sanders Show	Jon	Episode: "Hank's Sex Tape"	
1996–1997	Tracey Takes On...	Douglas Lund	2 episodes	
1997	Friends	Pete Becker	6 episodes	
1999	Hercules	Jealousy (voice)	Episode: "Hercules and the Green-Eyed Monster"	
1999	Rocket Power	Dick Shakley (voice)	Episode: "Otto 3000/Night Prowlers"	
2000	Dilbert	Holden Callfielder (voice)	Episode: "The Return"	
2000	Buzz Lightyear of Star Command	Crumford Lorak / Convict (voice)	5 episodes	
2000	The Sopranos	Himself	Episode: "D-Girl"	
2001–2005	Dinner for Five	Himself (host)	50 episodes	
2002	Family Guy	Donny Sciberra (voice)	Episode: "Road to Europe"	
2002	Rugrats	Mack Granite (voice)	Episode: "Starstruck/Who's Taffy?"	
2004	The King of Queens	Sean McGee	Episode: "Trash Talker"	
2006	My Name Is Earl	Mr. Patrick	Episode: "O Karma, Where Art Thou?"	
2006	Monk	Dr. Oliver Bloom	Episode: "Mr. Monk Goes to the Dentist"	
2009	Robot Chicken	Zeus, NASCAR Race Announcer (voice)	Episode: "Two Weeks Without Food"	
2010, 2012–2013	Star Wars: The Clone Wars	Pre Vizsla (voice)	6 episodes	
2019–2020	The Chef Show	Himself (co-host)	20 episodes	
2019, 2023	The Mandalorian	Paz Vizsla (voice)	6 episodes	
2020	Disney Gallery: The Mandalorian	Himself (host)	Main role	
2021–2023	What If...?	Happy Hogan, Happy Hogan / Freak, Sir Harold "The Happy" Hogan / Freak (voices)	4 episodes	
2022	The Book of Boba Fett	Paz Vizsla (voice)	Episode: "Chapter 5: Return of the Mandalorian"	

=== Video games ===
Year	Title	Role	Notes	Refs.
2009	G-Force	Hurley (voice)		
2026	Fortnite Battle Royale	Himself		

=== Web ===
Year	Title	Role	Notes
2013	Kevin Pollak's Chat Show	Himself/Guest	Episode: "165"

== Filmmaking credits ==
=== Feature Film ===
Year	Title	Director	Producer	Writer	Notes	Refs.
2001	Made	Yes	Yes	Yes		
2003	Elf	Yes	No	No		
2005	Zathura: A Space Adventure	Yes	No	No	Uncredited script revisions	
2008	Iron Man	Yes	Executive	No		
2010	Iron Man 2	Yes	Executive	No		
2011	Cowboys & Aliens	Yes	Executive	No		
2014	Chef	Yes	Yes	Yes		
2016	The Jungle Book	Yes	Yes	No		
2019	The Lion King	Yes	Yes	No		
2026	The Mandalorian and Grogu	Yes	Yes	Yes		

==== Executive Producers & Writer Only ====
Year	Title	Executive Producer	Writer	Notes	Refs.
1996	Swingers	No	Yes		
2002	The First $20 Million Is Always the Hardest	No	Yes		
2003	The Big Empty	Yes	No		
2005	Green Street	Yes	No		
2009	Couples Retreat	No	Yes		
2012	The Avengers	Yes	No		
2013	Iron Man 3	Yes	No		
2015	Avengers: Age of Ultron	Yes	No		
2018	Avengers: Infinity War	Yes	No		
2019	Avengers: Endgame	Yes	No		
2020	Alien Xmas	Yes	No		

=== Television Series ===
Year	Title	Director	Executive Producer	Writer	Notes	Refs.
2001–2005	Dinner for Five	No	Yes	No	Host	
2002	Undeclared	Yes	No	No	Episode: "Eric's POV"	
2007	In Case of Emergency	Yes	Yes	No	Episode: "Pilot"	
2012	Revolution	Yes	Yes	No	Episode: "Pilot"	
2013	The Office	Yes	No	No	Season 9, Episode 16: "Moving On"	
2014	About a Boy	Yes	Yes	No	Episode: "Pilot"	
2016	The Shannara Chronicles	No	Yes	No	Episode: "Chosen: Part 1"	
2017	The Orville	Yes	Yes	No	Episode: "Old Wounds"; Executive Consultant	
2017	Young Sheldon	Yes	Yes	No	Episode: "Pilot"	
2019–2020	The Chef Show	Yes	Yes	No	Co-host	
2019–2023	The Mandalorian	Yes	Yes	Yes	Writer: 20 out of 24 episodes Director: "Chapter 9: The Marshal"; Also creator	
2021–2022	The Book of Boba Fett	No	Yes	Yes	Writer and creator; 7 episodes	
2022–present	Prehistoric Planet	No	Yes	No	Documentary series	
2023–present	Star Wars: Ahsoka	No	Yes	No		
2024–2025	Star Wars: Skeleton Crew	No	Yes	No		
2026	Lion	No	Yes	No	Documentary mini-series	
2027	Oswald	TBA	Yes	Yes	Post-production	
