= The Chef Show =

American television cooking show

- Genre: Documentary; Cooking show
- Created by: Jon Favreau
- Directed by: Jon Favreau
- Presented by: Jon Favreau; Roy Choi
- Country of origin: United States
- No. of seasons: 2 (4 volumes)
- No. of episodes: 25

Production
- Executive producers: Jon Favreau; Roy Choi; Annie Johnson
- Running time: 26–34 minutes
- Production company: Fairview Entertainment

Original release
- Network: Netflix
- Release: June 7, 2019 – September 24, 2020

Related
- Chef

The Chef Show is an American television cooking show presented by Jon Favreau and Roy Choi that premiered on Netflix on June 7, 2019. Its creation was inspired by Favreau's training under the tutelage of Choi in preparation for the 2014 film Chef. Volume 2 premiered on September 13, 2019, and volume 3 premiered on February 19, 2020. A second season premiered on September 24, 2020.

== Premise ==
The Chef Show features director-actor Jon Favreau and chef Roy Choi with guests, cooking and interviewing.

== Episodes ==
=== Series overview ===
Season	Episodes		Originally released
1	20	8	June 7, 2019
1	20	6	September 13, 2019
1	20	6	February 19, 2020
2	5		September 24, 2020

=== Season 1 (2019–20) ===
No. overall	No. in season	Title	Original release date
Volume 1
1	1	"Gwyneth Paltrow / Bill Burr"	June 7, 2019
Dishes: Vegetarian Pepperpot soup, Roast Mojo Pork, Cubanos, Grilled cheese, Beignet. Guests: Gwyneth Paltrow, Bill Burr
2	2	"Avengers Atlanta"	June 7, 2019
Dishes: Holeman & Finch Burger, Lobster Roll, Shrimp Toast, Roast Mojo Pork Guests: Spencer Gomez, Ford Fry, Kevin Feige, Anthony Russo, Robert Downey Jr., Tom Holland, Joe Russo
3	3	"Chef Film Recipes"	June 7, 2019
Dishes: Berries & Cream, Scarlett's Pasta (Aglio E Olio), Chocolate Lava Cake, Beignets Guests: Andrew Rea
4	4	"Remembering Jonathan Gold"	June 7, 2019
A tribute to Los Angeles food critic Jonathan Gold with people who knew him. Dishes: Peach Galette, Green Curry, Pad Thai, Pad Kee Mao Guests: Evan Kleiman, Jazz Singsanong, Sariya Singsanong, Sirine Singsanong
5	5	"Robert Rodriguez / First Friday"	June 7, 2019
Dishes: Cauliflower Pizza Guests: Robert Rodriguez
6	6	"David Chang"	June 7, 2019
Dishes: Salsa Verde, Cauliflower Kimchi Fried Rice with Pork Belly, Seaweed Soup, Roy’s Kalbi, Braised Kalbi Stew Guests: David Chang
7	7	"Aaron Franklin"	June 7, 2019
Dishes: Brisket Guests: Aaron Franklin
8	8	"Hot Luck"	June 7, 2019
Dishes: Roy’s Kalbi, Kimchi, Roasted Smores Guests: Aaron Franklin, Daniel Vaughn, Rebecca Masson, Benjamin Jacob, Adam Perry Lang, Ivan Orkin
Volume 2
9	1	"Seth Rogen"	September 13, 2019
Dishes: Spicy Braised Chicken, Buttermilk Fried Chicken Guests: Seth Rogen
10	2	"Pizzana"	September 13, 2019
Dishes: Polpette Al Forno, Margherita pizza Guests: Daniele Uditi
11	3	"Guerrilla Tacos"	September 13, 2019
Dishes:: Breakfast Burrito, Hamachi Tostada, Sweet Potato Tacos, Lamb Al Pastor Taco Guests: Wes Avila
12	4	"Hog Island"	September 13, 2019
Dishes: Oysters on the Half Shell, Seaweed Salad, Mussels in White Wine Sauce Guests: Mariko Wilkinson
13	5	"Skywalker Ranch"	September 13, 2019
Dishes: Hangtown Fry, Tomato Carrot Salad, Sacrificial Salsa, Roasted Peaches and Plums with Cream, Bacon Wrapped Filet Mignon, Linguini and Clams Guests: Dave Filoni
14	6	"Extra Helpings with Babish and Dave"	September 13, 2019
Dishes: French Onion Soup, Hash Brown Breakfast, Kimchi, Bossam Guests: Andrew Rea, David Chang
Volume 3
15	1	"Wolfgang Puck"	February 19, 2020
Dishes: Omelette, Cote de Boeuf, Wagyu Brisket Sliders, Banana Cream Pie Guests: Wolfgang Puck
16	2	"Border Grill"	February 19, 2020
Dishes: Peruvian Border Ceviche, Baja Ceviche, Sweet Potato and Black Bean Tacos, Yucatan Pork Guests: Mary Sue Milliken, Susan Feniger
17	3	"Best Friend"	February 19, 2020
Dishes: Uni Dynamite Rice, Elotes, Grilled Fish with Ponzu Sauce, Spicy Pork BBQ, Fried Bologna Sandwich, LA Bacon Street Dog, Dumplings
18	4	"Pasta a la Raimi"	February 19, 2020
Dishes: Sourdough Bread, Pasta A La Raimi, Biscuits Guests: Sam Raimi
19	5	"Wexler's Deli"	February 19, 2020
Dishes: Wexler's Lox, Dana's Matzo Ball Soup, Roy's Pastrami and Lox Sandwich Guests: Micah Wexler, Michael Kasser
20	6	"Extra Helpings with Candace Nelson"	February 19, 2020
Dishes: Lobster Roll, Chocolate Olive Oil Cake Guests: Daniele Uditi, Candace Nelson

=== Season 2 (2020) ===
No. overall	No. in season	Title	Original release date
Volume 4
21	1	"Milk Bar Bake Sale"	September 24, 2020
Dishes: Cornflake Chocolate Chip Marshmallow Cookies, Grasshopper Pie, Chocolate Birthday Cake, Chocolate Birthday Cake Truffles Guests: Christina Tosi
22	2	"Roy's Italian Cuisine"	September 24, 2020
Dishes: $24 Spaghetti Sauce, Lasagne With Meatballs, Artichoke Salad
23	3	"Jessica Largey"	September 24, 2020
Dishes: Pork Meatballs En Brodo, Grilled Cabbage, Whole Aged Roast Duck Guests: Jessica Largey
24	4	"Tartine"	September 24, 2020
Dishes: Lemon Flatbread, Margherita Flatbread, Sourdough Country Loaf Guests: Chad Robertson, Chris Bianco
25	5	"Late Night Burger"	September 24, 2020
Dishes: Late Night Burger, Grilled Cheese, Coconut Tapioca Pudding Guests: Chad Robertson, Nina Subhas
