= Locol =

Defunct restaurant chain

Coordinates: 33.94302°N 118.23784°W

- Interactive map of Locol

Restaurant information
- Established: 2016
- Closed: 2018
- Food type: Health food; Fast food
- Location: Los Angeles

Locol (also stylized as Loco’l and LocoL) was a restaurant founded by Roy Choi and Daniel Patterson. The name connoted both "local" and "loco". The restaurant aspired to serve healthy alternatives to fast food at affordable prices while benefiting communities and disrupting food deserts. The restaurant's first location was in the Watts neighborhood of Los Angeles. After opening several other locations in California, all closed in 2018. Choi later revived the brand in 2020 as a delivery-only "virtual restaurant".

== History ==
=== Establishment ===
The company's founders, Daniel Patterson and Roy Choi, were both chefs in California prior to starting Locol. Patterson owned several high-end restaurants, including Coi in San Francisco. Choi owned an “empire” of food trucks, mostly serving tacos with ingredients inspired by Korean cuisine. In 2013, Patterson suffered a bout of depression, began a course of medication, and grew disillusioned with high-end dining. Later in 2013, Patterson saw Choi speak in Copenhagen about his personal and professional experience with poverty in Los Angeles. Choi concluded the talk by rhetorically asking the audience: “What if every high-caliber chef, all of us here, told our investors…that for every fancy restaurant we would build, it would be a requirement to build a restaurant in the hood as well?”. Patterson contacted Choi several months after the talk and together they began fleshing out a menu and business plan.

Choi first announced the plans for Locol at MAD Symposium in 2014. The announced goal of the restaurant was to offer healthy food at a competitive price point, with a menu items similar to larger fast food companies such as Burger King and McDonald's. Choi disclosed that the price range for individual items would generally hover between $2 and $6, with an upper limit of $8. In 2014 San Francisco's Tenderloin District was chosen as the location of the first restaurant, with pending second and third locations in Los Angeles and Oakland. After difficulties with the landlord in San Francisco, Choi mentioned the idea for Locol to Aqeela Sherrills, a Los Angeles-based activist. After the conversation, Sherrills temporarily rented a space to Choi and Patterson in Los Angeles. Despite difficulties with construction and permitting, Locol opened on Martin Luther King Jr. Day in 2016. Celebrities including Jon Favreau, Jim Brown, and Lena Dunham attended the opening.

Despite strong sales and attendance at the opening, the restaurant struggled, and most customers did not come from the target audience of Watts residents. After opening and closing two Oakland locations, the flagship Watts branch closed in August 2018. As of August 2018, the space remained in use by Locol as a catering kitchen and event space, and the company operated a Locol food truck after the closure.

=== Post-closure ===
After the closure of the Locol flagship and its conversion to an event space, Patterson opened both a restaurant and a coffee shop (Alta Adams and Adams Coffee Shop, respectively) in Los Angeles. The restaurant takes its name from Patterson's now-closed San Francisco restaurant, Alta. The new restaurant has goals similar to Locol's, and Patterson has referred to it as a "[...] sister restaurant". Several former Locol employees work at Alta Adams, including chef Keith Corbin, former kitchen manager at Locol. Alta Adams has received positive reviews.

Choi has rejected descriptions of Locol's closure as a "failure" and has indicated there are plans for a "3.0" version of the chain. Culinary news website Eater included Locol on its list of "The Saddest Los Angeles Restaurant Closures of 2018".

=== Reopening ===
Choi announced the restaurant would reopen as a "virtual restaurant" available through delivery app Chewbox in late 2019. The service plans to launch ghost kitchens to expand nationally.

On June 21, 2023, Corbin and Patterson announced that the restaurant would reopen and that Choi would not be involved in the renewed venture. On August 8, 2024 the restaurant opened again in its original location, serving a menu of soul food dishes. It operates as a non-profit under the Alta Community, a food-related incubator founded to address the issues of food insecurity and job training in the LA area.

== Menu and aesthetic ==
The menu focused on providing healthy and accessible versions of a variety of fast foods, including tacos, burgers, and a chicken sandwich. Locol also served coffee served from "high-end" beans at affordable prices.

== Ratings and reviews ==
=== Reviews ===
Pete Wells, the restaurant critic for The New York Times, visited Locol's Oakland location and reviewed it negatively, awarding it zero stars. Though Wells praised the restaurant's decor and interior design, he criticized the menu, concluding that the dishes "[...tasted] like hospital food". Wells attributed the quality of the food to Patterson and Choi focusing too strongly on the social mission of the restaurant.

Wells received criticism for his review. Before the review, Wells was known for "punching up" — generally reserving extreme criticism for high-end or well-funded restaurants. Wells' review of Locol was compared to a more famous negative review written of his, the 2012 panning of Guy Fieri's restaurant, Guy's American Kitchen & Bar. Jonathan Gold, the food critic at the Los Angeles Times, wrote an article responding to Wells' review, and discussed it with Wells, concluding that "Wells may not have been wrong, but he was ungenerous." The negative review was construed as "elitist" and referred to as a "[...] major blow" to the founders' efforts.

Luke Tsai, writing for the East Bay Express, gave the first Oakland location a mixed but largely positive review. He praised the cheeseburgers, egg sandwiches, and side dishes, and called the coffee possibly "the best $2 cup in town." He was unimpressed with the vegetarian offerings, found the cube-shaped seating uncomfortable, and noted that orders took much longer to come out than at true fast-food restaurants. He noted that a full meal would cost most customers $15.

=== Accolades ===
The restaurant won several awards. Food & Wine named it the Best New Restaurant of 2016.
