= Meyer Davis =

Meyer Davis may refer to:

- Meyer Davis (company)
- Meyer Davis (musician)
