= Daniel Patterson (chef) =

American chef and food writer

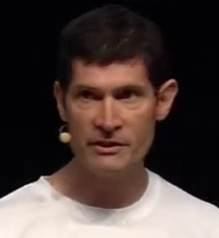
Patterson in 2015

Daniel Patterson is an American chef, restaurateur, and food writer.

== Life and career ==
Patterson was born in Lynn, Massachusetts. His mother was a French and history teacher, and his father John Patterson is a lawyer. He says his family's frequent travels to France influenced his views on food. He began working as a restaurant dishwasher at age 14, and attended Duke University before dropping out. In 1989 he moved to Sonoma, California with then-girlfriend (and later wife) Elizabeth Ramsey. With Ramsey, Patterson opened Babette's, a French-inspired restaurant, in Sonoma in 1994 at age 25. The restaurant subsequently closed in 1999 when his lease expired. Wine Spectator described it as a "top" restaurant in the town. Patterson and Ramsey opened Elizabeth Daniel in 2000, and closed it on New Years Day, 2004 due to slow business despite a strong reputation. He was opening chef at Frisson, a short-lived restaurant that incorporated elements of aromatherapy and molecular gastronomy.

Coi, which he opened in 2006, earned two Michelin stars, and was one of several restaurants in the San Francisco Bay Area to earn four stars from the San Francisco Chronicle. His cooking at Coi involves foraging for wild ingredients, and using aromas and essential oils.

He opened an informal rotisserie, Il Cane Rosso ("the red dog" in Italian), in the San Francisco Ferry Building with co-owner Lauren Kiino, before selling the business to her entirely. He opened restaurants Plum in Uptown Oakland in 2010 and Haven in Oakland's Jack London Square in 2012. In 2017, Patterson partnered with LA chef Roy Choi to open the fast food concept restaurant Locol, which received the LA Times Restaurant of the Year award before closing in 2018. In 2022, he closed his last Bay Area restaurant, Coi, which the San Francisco Chronicle said marked "the end of the chef’s reign in the Bay Area."

== Writing ==
Patterson is also a food writer. He is an occasional contributor to The New York Times Magazine, Food & Wine Magazine, and San Francisco Magazine. In 2004 he wrote The Magic of Essential Oils in Food and Fragrance together with co-author Mandy Aftel, a noted perfume maker. "To the Moon, Alice" (a reference to Alice Waters of Chez Panisse) published in 2005, generated considerable controversy for criticizing the tendency of San Francisco restaurants to copy the Chez Panisse style and approach, which he said resulted in self-righteousness over ingredients and a lack of creativity, complexity, or technical finesse. He also criticized San Francisco diners for avoiding food they considered too fancy, while paying similar prices for restaurants that featured home-style cooking, as a form of affected populism. One quote from the essay that is often repeated is: "so deeply embedded is the mythology of Chez Panisse in the DNA of local food culture that it threatens to smother stylistic diversity and extinguish the creativity that it originally sought to spark.”

== Awards and recognition ==
- Best New Chef, Food & Wine Magazine, 1997
- Rising Star Chef, San Francisco Chronicle, 1997
- Best New Restaurant, James Beard Foundation, 2001 (for Elizabeth Daniel)
- Chef of the Year, San Francisco Magazine, 2007
- Best Chef: Pacific (nominee), James Beard Foundation, 2009 and 2010
- Two Stars, Michelin Guide, 2021 (for Coi) (closed in 2022)
