= Prodigy Network =

Defunct American real estate crowd funding company

- Type: Privately held company
- Industry: Investment
- Founded: 2003
- Founder: Rodrigo Nino
- Defunct: 2017
- Fate: Unknown
- Headquarters: New York, New York, United States
- Number of locations: 3
- Area served: United States
- Key people: Rodrigo Nino (CEO & Founder)
- Services: Crowdfunding Real Estate Investing
- Number of employees: 35 (2016)
- Website: prodigynetwork.com

Prodigy Network was an American online real-estate crowdfunding platform that allowed investment into real-estate using a large number of small investments from many individual and institutional investors.

Its platform provided tools for investors to browse investments, perform due diligence and invest online. It was marketed to international investors and to accredited investors in the United States, and had raised $600 million from investors in 37 countries.

== History ==
Prodigy Network was founded in 2003 by Rodrigo Nino as a network of brokers interested in offering real-estate investments. After the JOBS Act was enacted, Prodigy Network launched its first crowdfunding campaign in New York City from its building on Wall Street.

In October 2013, Prodigy Network financed a landmark building located in New York’s Financial District. By November 2013 Prodigy raised $200 million with the completion of a crowdfunding campaign for the tallest building in the country in Bogotá, Colombia.

In June 2014, the company raised $12 million through a crowdfunding campaign for a building next to the United Nations headquarters. Around this time, the company ran a “design competition” to crowdsource design opportunities for the coworking and hotel space in 17 John and awarded winners.

In September 2014, the company finalized the crowdfunding campaign for 17 John St., a commercial building near Fulton Center.

In 2015, Time magazine reported on the opening of AKA United Nations, an extended-stay property near the United Nations that was termed the “first crowdfunded condo.”

In August 2015, the company launched a campaign for a property near the Flatiron Building and Madison Square Park.

In 2016, Prodigy Network raised funds for The Assemblage / Park, located in the NoMad neighborhood of Manhattan, and was acquired in June 2017.

In 2017, The New York Times reported Prodigy Network’s launch of its first coworking space, The Assemblage in NoMad. The property was designed by renown company Meyer Davis, as a venue to facilitate consciousness and collaboration. The property officially launched in November, and operates under four memberships with prices ranging between $200 and $6,500.

== Products ==
Prodigy Network focused on investing in coworking and co-living spaces and mixed-use real estate. Its projects included extended stay hotels, office towers, shopping center units, and condominiums. Its portfolio of six New York and two Colombian projects had a total value of $875 million.

== See also ==
- Crowdsourcing
- Disruptive Innovation
- Commercial Real Estate
