= Jitlada =

- Jungle curry at Jitlada

Restaurant information
- Owner: Jazz Singsanong
- Food type: Southern Thai cuisine
- Location: 5233 Sunset Boulevard, Los Angeles, California

Jitlada (Thai: จิตลดา) is a Thai restaurant in Thai Town, Los Angeles, notable for its spicy dishes. Opened in a Sunset Boulevard strip mall in the 1970s, the restaurant was purchased in 2007 by siblings Suthiporn “Tui” Sungkamee (Thai: สุทธิพร "ตุ๋ย" สังขมี) and Sarintip “Jazz” Singsanong (Thai: ศรินทิพย์ "แจ๊ส" สิงห์สนอง). Raised in Nakhon Si Thammarat province in Southern Thailand, Sungkamee and Singsanong specialized in Southern Thai cuisine, including dishes that emphasized turmeric, chili peppers, and Thai herbs. Sungkamee died in 2017, age 67.

Jitlada has been featured on two episodes of Diners, Drive-Ins and Dives, the third season of Food Paradise, season two of The Best Thing I Ever Ate, and The Migrant Kitchen.

The restaurant has also been featured in Food & Wine, Los Angeles Times and The New York Times.
