= Southern California Military Academy =

Defunct military academy in California, United States

Information
- Established: 1924
- Closed: 1987
- Age: 6 to 18
- Enrollment: c.400 (peak)

Southern California Military Academy (SCMA) was one of the estimated 50 private military academies established between the World Wars along the West Coast of the United States. Many of these schools, including SCMA, were well-respected and desirable with rigorous curricula and a path to future leadership positions within the US military. While the US military took over many of these academies during World War II and then sold the campuses after that war, SCMA remained as a school until 1987.

The local hallmark of SCMA was its World War I field artillery pieces displayed on Cherry Avenue, overlooking the Port of Long Beach.

== Beginnings (1924‒1947) ==
South Western Military Academy was founded in 1924 by local businessmen at 2065 Cherry Avenue, in the newly-incorporated Signal Hill enclave (surrounded by Long Beach, California).

In 1925, they sold it to Major and Mrs. Wilbur J. Watkins, who renamed it Southern California Military Academy (SCMA). It was a private military school that accepted boarding students and day school students, ages 6 to 18 years old. By 1931, it had 103 boarding students with tuition and board costing $725 (equivalent to $13,813 in 2024), 40 day students with tuition of $300 (equivalent to $5,715 in 2024), and 16 faculty members.

== Part of John Brown University schools (1947‒1980) ==
The Watkins became acquainted with John Elward Brown during the 1940s, and sold SCMA to him in 1947. Brown was a well-known educator and evangelist, and founder of John Brown University. However, at that time he also had other educational facilities with military ties:

- Two military academies in California (Brown School for Girls in Glendora, and Brown Military Academy in San Diego)
- One co-educational military academy in Sulphur Springs (Military Academy of the Ozarks)
- Two private airports used to teach people to fly during WWII (one in Siloam Springs, Arkansas and the other in West Siloam Springs, Oklahoma

In 1953, JBU reorganized the military schools, closing the coeducational one in Arkansas, and establishing SCMA as a feeder school for students who could attend through 9th grade, then transfer to Brown Military Academy to finish high school.

By 1958, SCMA had 170 boarding students with tuition and board costing $115 per month (equivalent to $1,242 in 2024), 316 day students with tuition of $60-$65 per month (equivalent to $648-$702 in 2024), and 51 faculty and staff members.

In 1975, the Daughters of the American Revolution presented SCMA with a Bicentennial marker, recognizing it as the 'oldest and largest military academy on the West Coast' and one that 'contributes to the morale and the military strength of this nation'.

== Later years (1980‒1987) ==
"Major" George Hurte and his wife Marie Hurte, who were graduates of John Brown University, worked as teachers and administrators, and later headmasters at SCMA for almost 40 years. In 1980, the Hurte family bought SCMA for less than $2 million (equivalent to $8 million in 2024), and continued to run it as a private, Christian-based military academy. Although enrollment peaked at about 400 cadets, the 1980s recession lowered this number and it never recovered.

In the summer of 1985, SCMA cadets were extras in the Sylvester Stallone movie, Over the Top.

In 1987, the Hurte family sold SCMA to Long Beach Unified School District for $4.6 million (equivalent to $12.7 million in 2024).

== Demolition and later commemoration ==
The Signal Hill community fought having the academy building demolished but the Long Beach school district razed it to build Alvarado Elementary. Included in the demolition was a memorial sidewalk with student medals and messages from alumni as they left for World War II, the Korean War, and the Vietnam War. No effort was made to preserve the historical sidewalk.

In 2011, alumni donated funds and negotiated with the school district to be allowed to place a bronze plaque on the school's southeast corner to commemorate the site's historical importance and to memorialize the people who attended the academy. The plaque reads:

This plaque commemorates the memory of the cadets, cadre and staff of the Southern California Military Academy which stood on this site from 1924 until it closed its doors in 1987.

With the motto,

CHARACTER BEFORE CAREER,

S.C.M.A. distinguished itself as a flagship of the local community whose alumni and cadre have served in WWII, Korea, Vietnam, the Gulf War, Iraq and Afghanistan as well as throughout the civilian community.

== Noted alumni ==
- Ben Westlund - Oregon state senator and independent candidate for Oregon governor in 2006.
- Marquez Pope - Businessman and former American professional football player.
- Roark Gourley - American painter, sculptor, and mixed media artist. He is best known for his 2.5 Dimensional wall sculptures that depict humorous subject matter. He has been working in Laguna Beach, California, for over thirty years.
- Roy Choi - Chef of Kogi Truck Eateries.
- Robert W, Hillman - Distinguished Professor of Law, University of California, Davis
- Bobby Burgess - One of the Original Mouseketeers and long featured dancer on the Lawrence Welk show.
