= Elisabeth Prueitt =

American pastry chef

Elisabeth “Liz” Prueitt is a pastry chef and along with her husband Chad Robertson, the owner of the San Francisco bakery chain Tartine.

== Early life ==
Elisabeth Prueitt is a native of Park Slope, Brooklyn. Prueitt first studied acting, then photojournalism, then enrolled in the Culinary Institute of America's (CIA) chef’s training program, where she met her future husband and business partner Chad Robertson. She interned and line-cooked at Montrachet, in New York City before graduating from the CIA in 1993. In 1994, Prueitt and Robertson traveled to, and worked through, France, learning from bakers such as Daniel Collin (in Provence) and Patrick Le Port (in Savoie).

== Career ==
Prueitt and Chad Robertson, ran the Wood-Fire Baking in Point Reyes and Bay Village Breads in Mill Valley.

Robertson and Prueitt then opened their first Tartine location in 2002. Bar Tartine, and in 2011, Tartine Sandwich followed.

She has been described in published sources as a “brilliant pastry chef” and a “pastry prodigy.”

== Personal life ==
Prueitt was married to Chad Robertson, who she met during her studies at the Culinary Institute of America. In the 2000s, they had a child who was diagnosed with cerebral palsy. Prueitt paused her career for several years to care for their child and, around 2011, co-founded the Conductive Learning Center of San Francisco. The center runs summer camps for children with motor disabilities.

Prueitt is gluten intolerant.

== Publications ==
- Prueitt, Elisabeth M.; Robertson, Chad (24 August 2006). Tartine. Chronicle Books. ISBN 978-0-8118-5150-3.
- Prueitt, Elisabeth (4 April 2017). Tartine All Day: Modern Recipes for the Home Cook. Lorena Jones Books. ISBN 978-0-3995-7882-3.
- Prueitt, Elisabeth M.; Robertson, Chad; Waters, Alice (2019). Tartine: Revised Edition: A Classic Revisited. Chronicle Books. ISBN 9781452178738.

== Awards and honors ==
- James Beard Award Best pastry chef.
