= Coi (restaurant) =

Restaurant in San Francisco, California

Coordinates: 37.7981°N 122.4035°W

- Interactive map of Coi

Restaurant information
- Established: 2006; 20 years ago
- Closed: 2022; 4 years ago
- Owner: Daniel Patterson
- Head chef: Erik Anderson
- Rating: (Michelin Guide)
- Location: 373 Broadway, San Francisco, California, United States
- Website: www.coirestaurant.com

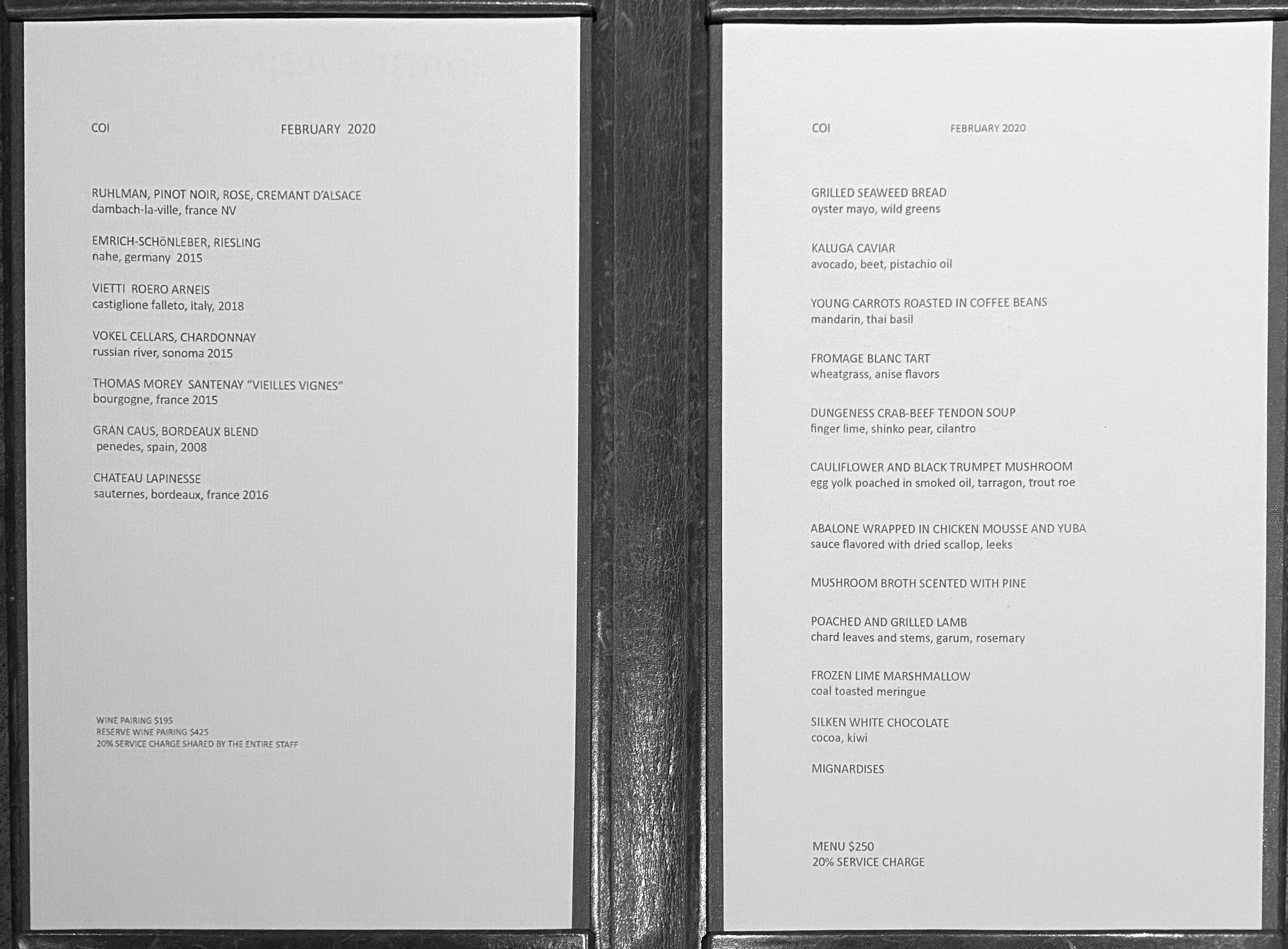
COI menu February 2020

Coi was a restaurant in San Francisco, California. It served a nightly tasting menu for $250 per diner featuring seafood of the California coast. In 2017, it was awarded three Michelin stars under executive chef Matthew Kirkley.

In 2018, Erik Anderson succeeded Kirkley, who left to prepare for the 2019 Bocuse D’Or. In April 2018, San Francisco Chronicle critic Michael Bauer noted a decline under Anderson, writing, "While I can clearly see lots of talent in the kitchen, what arrives on the plate doesn’t create the excitement of a four-star kitchen."

== See also ==
- List of Michelin-starred restaurants in California
