= Roy Choi =

Korean American chef

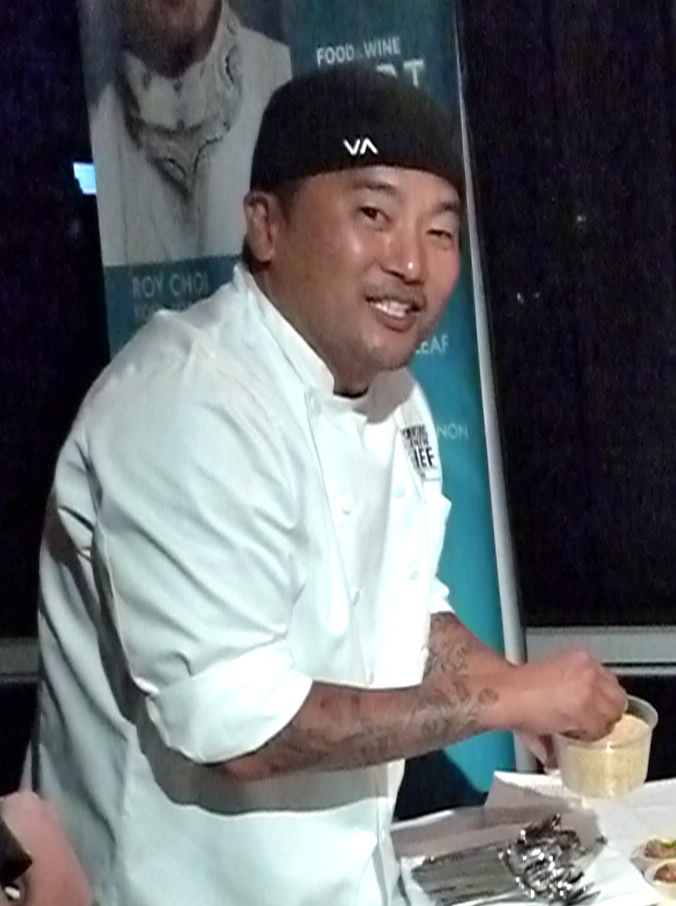
- Roy Choi from Kogi BBQ; Aspen Food & Wine Fest 2010
- Born: Roy S Choi; February 24, 1970 (age 56); Seoul, South Korea
- Education: Culinary Institute of America; California State University, Fullerton; Southern California Military Academy
- Culinary career
- Current restaurants
- Kogi Korean BBQ; Best Friend (Park MGM, The Strip); LocoL (food truck)
- Television shows
- Anthony Bourdain: Parts Unknown; The Chef Show; Ugly Delicious; Broken Bread
- Website: kogibbq.com

Roy Choi (born February 24, 1970) is a Korean-American chef who gained prominence as the creator of the gourmet Korean-Mexican taco truck Kogi. Choi is a chef who is celebrated for "food that isn't fancy" and is known as one of the founders of the gourmet food truck movement. In 2019, Choi began presenting a cooking series on Netflix with Jon Favreau titled The Chef Show.

== Early life ==
Choi was born in Seoul, South Korea, to South Korean father Soo Myung Choi and North Korean mother Jai Nam Choi. Choi's parents met in the U.S. but after marrying moved back to Korea. The family ended up emigrating from South Korea permanently in 1972.

Choi was raised in Los Angeles and Southern California. As Choi grew up, his parents had many businesses: a liquor store, dry-cleaning shop, a Korean restaurant, and after selling jewelry door to door, finally a successful jewelry company. His parents owned a Korean restaurant called Silver Garden in Anaheim, California for three years when he was young. Choi's mother made kimchi that was so popular within their community that they packaged it and sold it locally. His favorite childhood memory is making dumplings at the age of eight at his family's own restaurant. His family moved many times while he was young.

His family once lived near Olympic Boulevard and Vermont Avenue, as well as in South Central, the Crenshaw District and West Hollywood.

Choi attended a gifted-students program, but changed schools in his early teens when his parents achieved prosperity in the jewelry business and moved their family into a neighborhood in Orange County called Villa Park, Choi began getting into trouble, with his marks slipping as he began taking drugs and hanging out with a different crowd. At age 15, Choi's parents sent him to Southern California Military Academy in Signal Hill, California. He remembers this as a positive experience.

After high school, Choi went to Korea and taught English there. He then attended California State University, Fullerton, graduating with a bachelor's degree in philosophy. Choi attended Western State University law school, and dropped out after one semester. At 24, Choi said he became obsessed with Emeril Lagasse's "Essence of Emeril" show. The show inspired him to enroll in culinary school. "Emeril saved my life," Choi said.

In 1996, Choi began studying at the Culinary Institute of America in Hyde Park, New York. He enjoyed the highly structured block programs, where there was no "wiggle room." During his studies, he worked as an intern at three-Michelin-star restaurant Le Bernardin, in New York City.

== Career ==
Choi gained experience as a journeyman hotel chef, and in 2001, started working for Hilton Hotels. After being promoted within the company, Choi became chef de cuisine at the Beverly Hilton in 2007. It was there that Choi met his future business partner, Mark Manguera. Choi also worked at the Embassy Suites in Sacramento and the Rock Sugar Pan Asian Kitchen in Los Angeles.

After this classical training and years of background in Michelin-star cooking, Choi said that the shift to the food trucks, initially based on Abbot Kinney Boulevard in Venice was great. Choi's company, Kogi, was founded in 2008 with partners Mark Manguera and his wife, Caroline Shin-Manguera.

He was named one of the top ten "Best New Chefs" of 2010 by Food and Wine magazine, and is the first food truck operator to win that distinction. Choi currently runs Sunny Spot, in Venice, CA, which is Caribbean-inspired. He ran the Los Angeles-area restaurant Chego! which featured rice bowls, and A-Frame which conveyed the Hawaiian idea of aloha and was built in a former IHOP, in addition to Pot at the Line Hotel in Koreatown. In December, 2018, Choi opened a restaurant named Best Friend in Las Vegas, NV. His cooking style fuses Mexican and Korean flavors and dishes.

In June 2013, Choi along with fellow chefs Wolfgang Puck and David Chang, convened at the Hotel Bel-Air to fuse different styles such as ggaejjang style and kochujang onto the Hotel Bel-Air menu.

In November 2013, Choi released his autobiography that is part memoir part cookbook called L.A. Son: My Life, My City, My Food.

Choi said he didn't start out to write a book, but that he kept getting asked the same questions about his food, its flavors, and how it is prepared. While Choi doesn't see the book as social commentary, he felt it was important to show the "real deal" of the duality he felt growing up as an immigrant in the 1970s; the foods served in the restaurant were quite different from what the family ate at home. The book also talks about the culture of Los Angeles and how it has changed since the 1970s.

The Jon Favreau movie Chef (2014) was loosely inspired by Choi and the food truck movement. Choi worked as a technical advisor to Favreau on cooking and restaurant scenes and appears in the end credits. In addition to touring all of Choi's restaurants, Favreau attended a French culinary school and trained in several of Choi's kitchens. In 2019, Favreau and Choi collaborated on a cooking show on Netflix: The Chef Show.

Time had included Choi in their TIME 100 list of the most influential people in the world for 2011 and 2016. Fellow chef and author Anthony Bourdain wrote that "Roy Choi first changed the world when he elevated the food-truck concept from "roach coach" to highly sought-after, ultra-hot-yet-democratic rolling restaurant." In 2015, Choi and chef Daniel Patterson opened a restaurant called LocoL in Watts, Los Angeles, with the goal of bringing quality, healthy, and inspired fast-food to inner-city neighborhoods.

In 2019, Choi produced and hosted a TV series, Broken Bread on Tastemade and KCET in Los Angeles.

In April 2025, Choi released The Choi of Cooking, a cookbook featuring healthier, vegetable-forward recipes.

He also appeared in a recent Netflix project with Meghan Markle that features cooking segments in which they discuss their shared experience of growing up in Los Angeles.

== Personal life ==
Choi goes by the nicknames "Papi" and "El Guapo." He maintains a blog on which he posts recipes and rants. Choi has a daughter.

He teaches cooking when he volunteers at A Place Called Home in South Los Angeles. Choi is a supporter of 3 Worlds Cafe, a South Central community coffee and smoothie shop that is a collaboration between Choi, the neighborhood-based Coalition for Responsible Community Development, fruit conglomerate Dole Packaged Foods and nearby Jefferson High School.

During his difficult teen years and later as a young adult, Choi said he had many addictions. He was addicted to crack for a short time, marijuana and gambling, which lasted three years in his early 20s. In his late 20s, he kicked his addiction to drugs and began to cook more seriously. Choi says that his current addiction is feeding people.

== Publications ==
- Choi, Roy; Nguyen, Tien; Phan, Natasha & Fisher, Bobby (2013). L.A. Son: My Life, My City, My Food. New York, NY: Ecco, an imprint of HarperCollins Publishers. ISBN 978-0-062-20263-5.
- Choi, Roy; Nguyen, Tien & Phan, Natasha (2025). The Choi of Cooking. Clarkson Potter. ISBN 978-0593579251.
