= Jazz Singsanong =

Sarintip “Jazz” Singsanong (Thai: ศรินทิพย์ "แจ๊ส" สิงห์สนอง) is a Thai American chef and owner of Jitlada, a Southern Thai restaurant in Los Angeles.

== Life ==
Born and raised in Nakhon Si Thammarat province in Southern Thailand, in 2006 Jazz moved to Los Angeles to take over Jitlada with her brother, Suthiporn “Tui” Sungkamee. Following Tui's death in 2017, Jazz became the owner of Jitlada.

In 2021, Jazz and Jitlada were featured on Diners, Drive-ins and Dives.

In 2022 and 2023, Jazz was nominated as a semifinalist for the James Beard Foundation Award for Best Chef: California.
