= Dinner for Five =

- First season DVD cover
- Created by: Jon Favreau
- Starring: Jon Favreau
- Country of origin: United States
- No. of episodes: 50

Production
- Running time: 30 minutes

Original release
- Network: IFC
- Release: July 6, 2001 – June 24, 2005

Dinner for Five is an American television program in which actor and film director Jon Favreau and a revolving guest list of celebrities eat, drink and talk. The program aired on IFC from July 6, 2001, to June 24, 2005, with Favreau as the co-executive producer with Peter Billingsley.

== Overview ==
The show format was a spontaneous, open forum for people in the entertainment community. The idea, originally conceived by Favreau, originated from a time when he went out to dinner with colleagues on a film location and exchanged filming anecdotes. Favreau said, "I thought it would be interesting to show people that side of the business". He did not want to present them in a "sensationalized way [that] they're presented in the press, but as normal people". The format featured Favreau and four guests from the entertainment industry in a restaurant with no other diners. They ordered actual food from real menus and were served by authentic waiters. There were no cue cards or previous research on the participants that would have allowed him to orchestrate the conversation and the guests were allowed to talk about whatever they wanted. The show used five cameras with the operators using long lenses so that they could be at least ten feet away from the table and not intrude on the conversation or make the guests self-conscious. The conversations lasted until the film ran out. A 25-minutes episode would be edited from the two-hour dinner. The one exception to the standard format was Favreau having a conversation with Martin Scorsese, done in a more traditional interview style.

== Release ==
The show was canceled by IFC in favor of The Henry Rollins Show because the network felt that "four years in, we needed to make a change, and we needed to make a bold statement." Netflix and IFC produced a special 50th episode of Dinner for Five, which premiered on IFC February 1, 2008 and became available on Netflix starting February 4, 2008. The 50th episode featured Favreau and Vaughn, as well as Peter Billingsley, Justin Long and Keir O'Donnell, who appear in Vince Vaughn's Wild West Comedy Show.

== Home media ==
A DVD was released by Fox Lorber in 2004 of the complete first season. Subsequent DVDs were released by Fairview Entertainment in 2007 as "manufactured on demand when ordered from Amazon" discs. The Fairview-released DVDs are not programmed as complete seasons, but under the aegis of "Jon Favreau presents his 10 most memorable moments/segments" from the series. These bear the titles "Favreau's Favorites", "Best Directors", "On The Road" and "Producer's Picks".

== Guests ==
- J. J. Abrams
- Joey Lauren Adams
- Ben Affleck
- Danny Aiello
- Judd Apatow
- Rosanna Arquette
- Edward Asner
- Sean Astin
- Philip Baker Hall
- Alec Baldwin
- Jason Bateman
- Jennifer Beals
- Ed Begley, Jr.
- Peter Berg ×3
- Jason Biggs
- Buzz Bissinger
- Peter Bogdanovich
- Saffron Burrows
- David Byrne
- James Caan
- Bruce Campbell
- Neve Campbell
- George Carlin
- Michael Chiklis
- Louis C.K.
- Patricia Clarkson
- Rory Cochrane
- Sean Combs
- Roger Corman
- Brian Cox
- David Cross ×2
- Alan Cumming ×2
- Beverly D'Angelo
- Ted Danson
- Frank Darabont
- Michael De Luca
- Dom DeLuise ×2
- Laura Dern
- Zooey Deschanel
- Andy Dick
- Peter Dinklage
- Richard Donner
- Stephen Dorff
- Illeana Douglas ×2
- Fran Drescher
- Steven Drozd
- David Duchovny
- Charles Durning
- Dave Eggers
- Ron Eldard
- Hector Elizondo
- Jennifer Esposito
- Peter Falk ×2
- Dennis Farina
- Colin Farrell
- Will Ferrell ×2
- Carrie Fisher ×2
- Dave Foley
- Jeff Garlin ×2
- Jennifer Garner
- Janeane Garofalo
- Gina Gershon
- Adam Goldberg ×2
- Jeff Goldblum
- Brian Grazer
- Seth Green
- David Alan Grier
- Luis Guzmán ×2
- Maggie Gyllenhaal
- Mark Hamill
- Daryl Hannah
- Cole Hauser
- Tony Hawk
- Sean Hayes
- Jon Heder
- John Herzfeld
- George Hickenlooper
- Katie Holmes
- Ernie Hudson
- Bonnie Hunt ×2
- Amy Irving
- Eddie Izzard
- Kevin James ×3
- Famke Janssen ×2
- Catherine Kellner
- Laura Kightlinger
- John Landis
- Denis Leary
- Stan Lee
- Jason Lee
- John Leguizamo
- Juliette Lewis
- Richard Lewis ×2
- Delroy Lindo
- Ron Livingston ×2
- Faizon Love ×4
- Seth MacFarlane
- Michael Madsen
- Bill Maher
- Marilyn Manson
- Joe Mantegna
- Michael McKean
- David Milch
- Larry Miller
- Penelope Ann Miller
- Isaac Mizrahi
- Jay Mohr
- Tracy Morgan
- Cathy Moriarty
- Alanis Morissette
- Tim Blake Nelson
- Bob Odenkirk ×2
- Timothy Olyphant
- Leland Orser
- Cheri Oteri
- Joe Pantoliano
- Barry Pepper
- Stacy Peralta
- Rosie Perez
- Oliver Platt
- Martha Plimpton
- Kevin Pollak ×2
- Colin Quinn
- Michael Rapaport ×2 & missed 1 due to Ted Demme's death
- Charles Nelson Reilly
- Burt Reynolds ×2
- Giovanni Ribisi
- Christina Ricci
- Henry Rollins
- Ray Romano ×2
- Stephen Root ×2
- Jeffrey Ross
- Paul Rudd
- John Sayles
- Liev Schreiber
- Martin Scorsese
- Tony Shalhoub
- Garry Shandling
- Molly Shannon
- Harry Shearer
- Dax Shepard
- Sarah Silverman ×2
- Christian Slater
- Kevin Smith ×2 & 1 as guest host
- Mary Steenburgen ×2
- Rod Steiger
- Jeffrey Tambor
- Lili Taylor
- Billy Bob Thornton
- Jeanne Tripplehorn
- Tracey Ullman
- Blair Underwood
- Vince Vaughn ×3
- John Waters
- Fred Willard ×2
- Henry Winkler
- Dwight Yoakam
- Rob Zombie
