= Tartine =

American bakery chain

Coordinates: 37°45′41.96″N 122°25′25.25″W

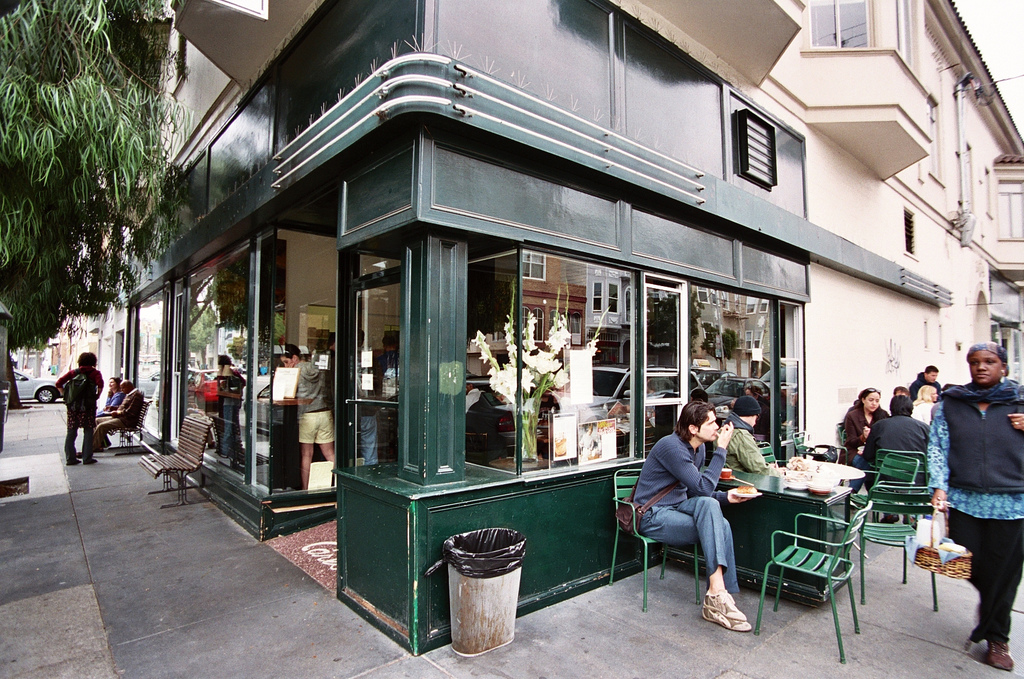
- 18th and Guerrero location, San Francisco, 2006
- Industry: Bakery chain
- Founded: 2002; 24 years ago in San Francisco, California
- Number of locations: 14 (2022)
- Areas served: San Francisco Bay Area, Los Angeles, Seoul Capital Area
- Key people: Elisabeth Prueitt and Chad Robertson, owners
- Website: tartinebakery.com

Tartine is a small, US-based bakery chain. As of February 2022, it operates three locations in the San Francisco Bay Area, five in Los Angeles, and six in Seoul Capital Area, South Korea. Its original bakery opened in 2002 in San Francisco's Mission District, at 600 Guerrero Street.

== History ==
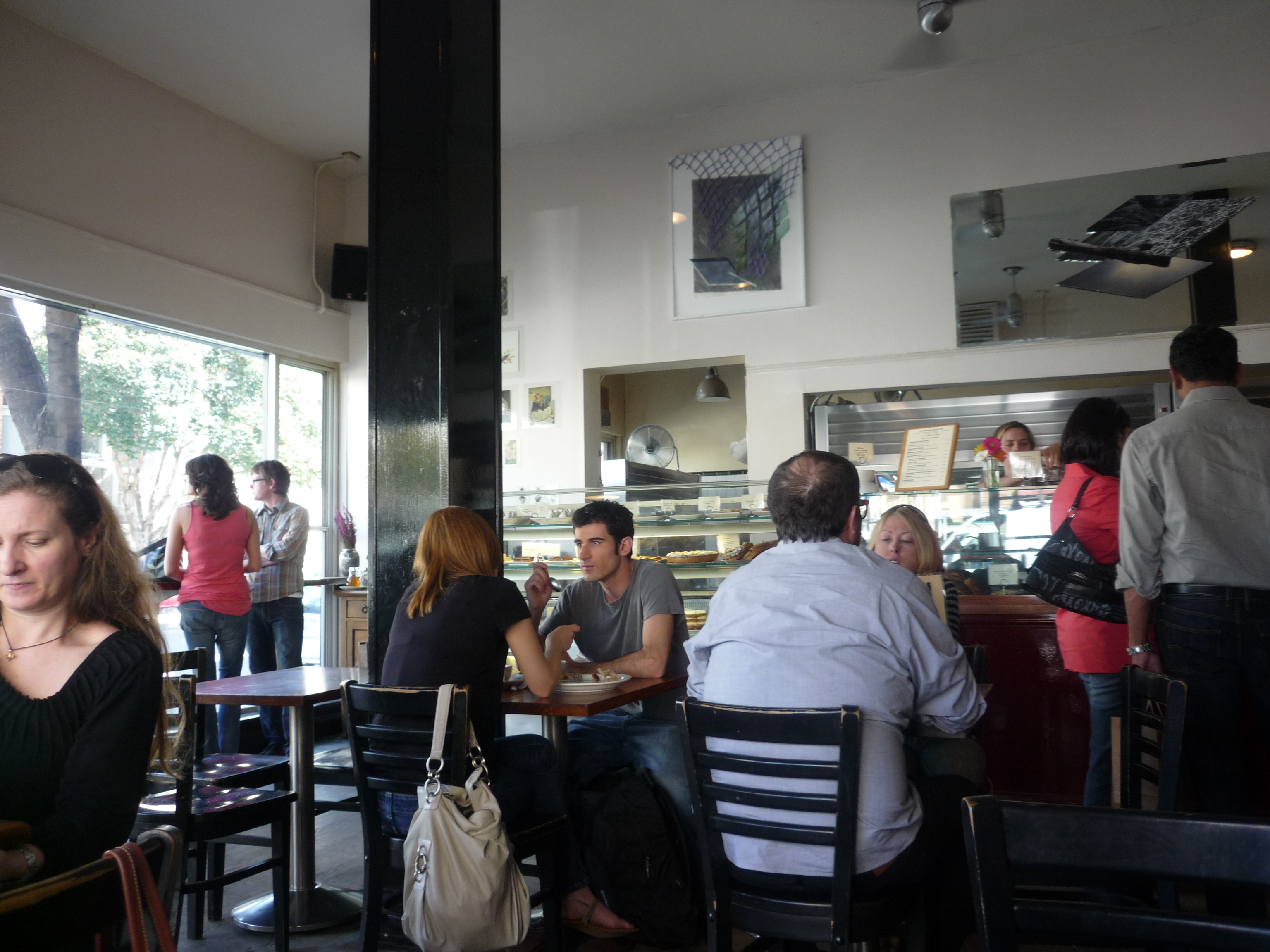
Tartine interior in 2010

Tartine (the word means "open faced sandwich" in French) opened in 2002, on the site of two previous bakeries, Carl's Bakery, then Lady Baltimore Bakery. Elisabeth Prueitt and Chad Robertson, its owners, had previously run the Wood-Fire Baking in Point Reyes and Bay Village Breads in Mill Valley. After the success of their San Francisco bakery they also opened the nearby Bar Tartine in 2006 and published a book of recipes from their bakery.

In April 2015, it was announced that Tartine's bakery operations would merge with Blue Bottle Coffee and that the Bar Tartine restaurant would be sold to its chefs. However, the merger was called off later the same year after "deciding that remaining separate companies [made] the most sense".

=== Expansion ===
The bakery chain saw a period of rapid expansion in the late 2010s, opening further locations in the Bay Area as well as opening new locations in Los Angeles and South Korea. A large "Manufactury" complex in Los Angeles was shut down in December 2019, after operating for less than a year, but as of February 2020, three LA locations remain open, with two additional ones still planned to launch. At that time, Tartine had five Bay Area facilities: the original bakery at Guerrero and 18th, the "Manufactory" (also in the Mission District), one in the San Francisco's Inner Sunset, one in Berkeley (with around 215 employees at these four locations), and another one at San Francisco International Airport.

Tartine hired Chris Jordan, a Starbucks executive, as a COO who developed a partnership with CIM Group, a real-estate private-equity firm, for amenity-oriented anchor tenancies, at CIM real-estate.

== Reception ==
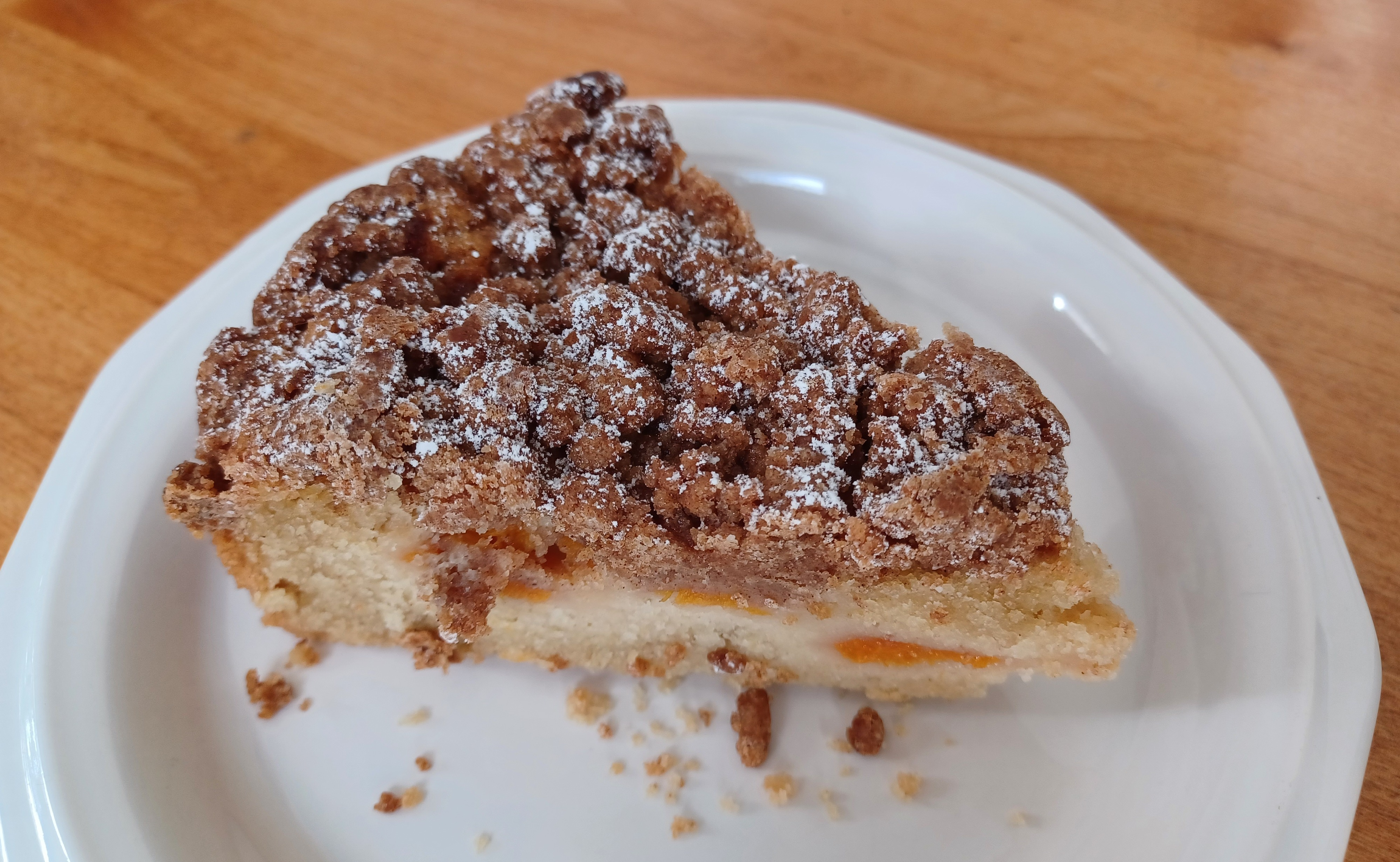
Vegan crumb cake sold by Tartine

In 2007, The New York Times food columnist Mark Bittman called Tartine his favorite bakery in the U.S.

In 2008, its owners won James Beard Foundation Awards as the best pastry chefs in America, after previously being nominated for this award in 2006 and 2007.

== Safety issues ==
In November 2019, Tartine's Guerrero St. location was briefly shut down by the San Francisco Department of Public Health after inspectors say that its operators failed to address a persistent rodent infestation in the space. The location was reopened the following week, with the owners citing the building's age as a key issue.

== Employee unionization ==
In early 2020, 141 employees across three of Tartine's San Francisco locations signed a letter declaring their intent to join the International Longshore and Warehouse Union (ILWU) in hopes of getting better pay and a fairer balance of power between workers and management.

In response to the unionization efforts, Elisabeth Prueitt said she's pro-union in many cases but wants to keep Tartine union-free, in part because she believes Tartine already provides fair wages and strong benefits.

Tartine workers voted on forming a union during March 2020. Following litigation regarding 24 challenged votes, Tartine's workers were officially unionized on March 30, 2021 - over a year after voting - with 93 workers in favour of the union, and 90 against.

In May 2022, Tartine Union began negotiations for the first wage and healthcare contract, and as of 23 August 2022 are stalled.

== Works ==
- Prueitt, Elisabeth M.; Robertson, Chad (August 24, 2006). Tartine. Chronicle Books. ISBN 978-0-8118-5150-3.
- Robertson, Chad (October 29, 2013). Tartine Bread. Chronicle Books. ISBN 978-1-4521-0028-9.
- Robertson, Chad (December 17, 2013). Tartine Book No. 3: Modern Ancient Classic Whole. Chronicle Books. ISBN 978-1-4521-2846-7.
- Prueitt, Elisabeth (April 4, 2017). Tartine All Day: Modern Recipes for the Home Cook. Lorena Jones Books. ISBN 978-0-3995-7882-3.
