= Jon Favreau =

American actor and filmmaker (born 1966)

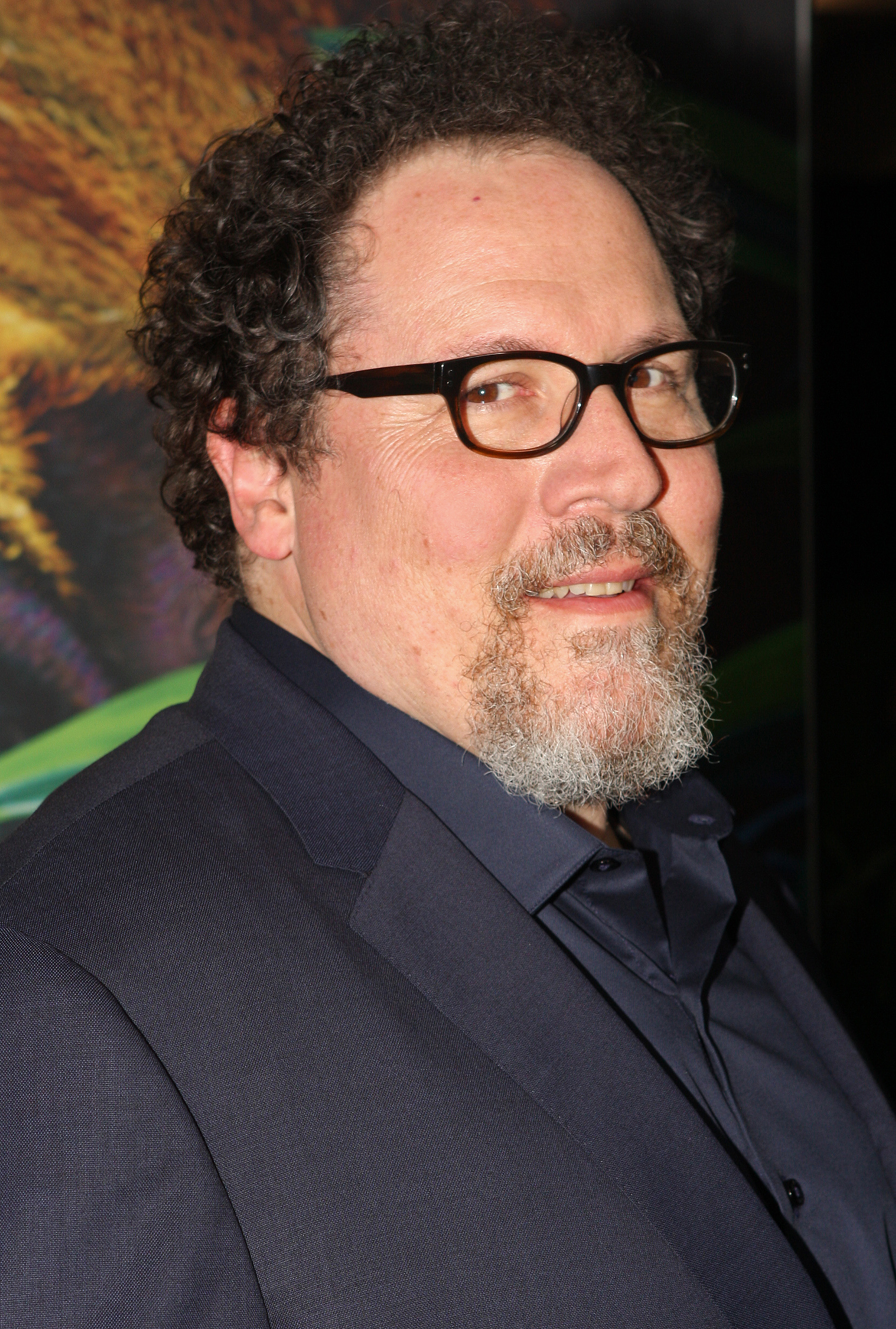
- Favreau in 2016
- Born: Jonathan Kolia Favreau; October 19, 1966 (age 60); New York City, U.S.
- Occupations: Actor; filmmaker
- Years active: 1988–present
- Works: Full list
- Spouse: Joya Tillem (m. 2000)
- Children: 3

Jonathan Kolia Favreau (/ˈfævroʊ/ FAV-roh; born October 19, 1966) is an American actor and filmmaker. He has received numerous accolades including an Emmy Award and two Saturn Awards.

As an actor, Favreau has appeared in many films such as Rudy (1993), PCU (1994), Swingers (1996), Very Bad Things (1998), Deep Impact (1998), The Replacements (2000), Daredevil (2003), Wimbledon (2004), The Break-Up (2006), Four Christmases (2008), Couples Retreat (2009), I Love You, Man (2009), People Like Us (2012), The Wolf of Wall Street (2013), and Chef (2014).

As a filmmaker, Favreau has been significantly involved with the Marvel Cinematic Universe. He directed, produced, and appeared as Happy Hogan in the films Iron Man (2008) and Iron Man 2 (2010). He also served as an executive producer or appeared as the character in the films The Avengers (2012), Iron Man 3 (2013), Avengers: Age of Ultron (2015), Spider-Man: Homecoming (2017), Avengers: Infinity War (2018), Avengers: Endgame (2019), Spider-Man: Far From Home (2019), Spider-Man: No Way Home (2021), and Deadpool & Wolverine (2024).

He has also directed the films Elf (2003), Zathura: A Space Adventure (2005), Cowboys & Aliens (2011), Chef (2014), The Jungle Book (2016), The Lion King (2019), and The Mandalorian and Grogu (2026). Favreau has been known for his work on the Star Wars franchise with Dave Filoni, creating the Disney+ original series The Mandalorian (2019–2023), which Filoni helped develop, with both serving as executive producers. Alongside Filoni, he serves as an executive producer on all of the show's spin-off series, including The Book of Boba Fett, Ahsoka, and Skeleton Crew. He produces films under his production company banner, Fairview Entertainment, and also presented the variety series Dinner for Five and the cooking series The Chef Show.

== Early life ==
Favreau was born in Flushing, Queens, New York, on October 19, 1966, the only child of Madeleine, an elementary school teacher who died of leukemia in 1979, and Charles Favreau, a special education teacher. His mother was Ashkenazi Jewish and his father is a Catholic of Italian and French-Canadian ancestry. Favreau dropped out of Hebrew school to pursue acting. However, following his mother's death, both sides of his family worked to ensure he had a bar mitzvah ceremony.

Favreau graduated from The Bronx High School of Science, a school for gifted students, in 1984 and attended Queens College from 1984 to 1987, before dropping out. His friend from college, Mitchell Pollack, has said that Favreau went by the nickname "Johnny Hack" because of his abilities in the game Hacky Sack. He briefly worked for Bear Stearns on Wall Street before returning to Queens College for a semester in early 1988. He dropped out of college for good (a few credits shy of completing his degree), and moved to Chicago in the summer of 1988 to pursue a career in comedy. He performed at several Chicago improvisational theaters, including the ImprovOlympic and the Improv Institute.

== Career ==
=== 1992–2000: Early career ===
While in Chicago, Favreau landed his first film role alongside Sean Astin as tutor D-Bob in the sleeper hit Rudy (1993). Favreau met Vince Vaughn – who played a small role in this film – during shooting. The next year, he appeared in the college film PCU alongside Jeremy Piven, and the 1994 episode of Seinfeld titled "The Fire" as Eric the Clown.

Favreau then moved to Los Angeles, where he made his breakthrough in 1996 as an actor-screenwriter with the film Swingers, which was also Vaughn's breakthrough role as the character Trent Walker, a foil to Favreau's heartbroken Mike Peters. In 1997, he appeared on the television sitcom Friends, portraying Pete Becker – Monica Geller's millionaire boyfriend who competes in the Ultimate Fighting Championship (UFC) – for several episodes. Favreau made appearances in the sketch-comedy series, Tracey Takes On... in both 1996 and 1997.

Favreau landed the role of Gus Partenza in Deep Impact (1998), and that same year rejoined Piven in Very Bad Things (1998). In 1999, he starred in the television film Rocky Marciano, based on the life of world heavyweight champion, Rocky Marciano. He later appeared in Love & Sex (2000), co-starring Famke Janssen. Favreau appeared in 2000's The Replacements as maniacal linebacker Daniel Bateman, and that same year he played himself in The Sopranos episode "D-Girl", as a Hollywood director who feigns interest in developing mob associate Christopher Moltisanti's screenplay in order to collect material for his own screenplay.

=== 2001–2015: Actor–director ===
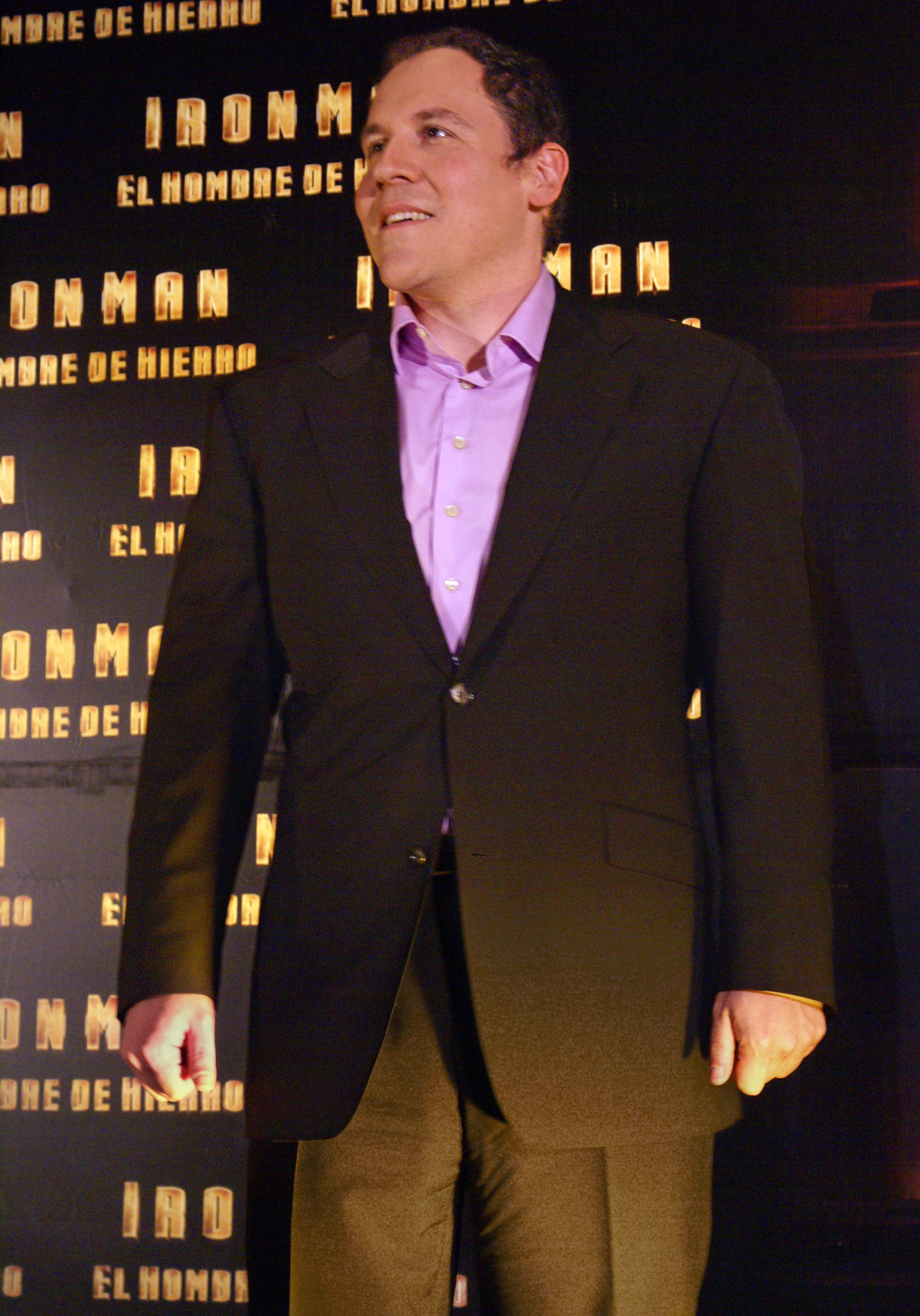
Favreau at an Iron Man photocall in Mexico City in 2008

In 2001, he made his film directorial debut with another self-penned screenplay, Made. Made once again teamed him up with his Swingers co-star Vince Vaughn. Favreau also starred in a TV series called Dinner for Five, which aired on the cable TV channel IFC from 2001 to 2005.

He was a guest-director for an episode of the college dramedy Undeclared in 2001, and Favreau got some screen time as lawyer Foggy Nelson in the 2003 movie Daredevil (2003) (considerably more in the director's cut version). He also starred in The Big Empty (2003), directed by Steve Anderson. His character was John Person, an out of work actor given a strange mission to deliver a blue suitcase to a man named Cowboy in the desert. Favreau is credited as a screenwriter for the 2002 film The First $20 Million Is Always the Hardest.

He scored his first financial success as a director of the hit comedy Elf (2003) starring Will Ferrell, Zooey Deschanel, James Caan, and Peter Dinklage. Also in 2003, Favreau had a small part in Something's Gotta Give (a film starring Diane Keaton and Jack Nicholson); Favreau played Leo, Harry Sanborn's (Nicholson) personal assistant, who visited Harry in the hospital. In 2005, Favreau directed the film adaptation of the children's book Zathura. It received positive reviews, but was not commercially successful. Favreau continued to make regular appearances in film and television. He reunited with friend Vaughn in the romantic comedy The Break-Up and appeared in My Name Is Earl as a reprehensible fast food manager. Favreau also made a guest appearance in Vaughn's Wild West Comedy Show.

Also in 2005, Favreau appeared as a guest judge and executive representative of Sony Corporation in week five of the NBC business-focused primetime reality TV show, The Apprentice. He was called upon to judge the efforts of the show's two teams of contestants, who were assigned the task of designing and building a float to publicize his 2005 Sony Pictures movie, Zathura: A Space Adventure.

On April 28, 2006, it was announced that Favreau was signed to direct the long-awaited Iron Man movie. Released on May 2, 2008, the film was a huge critical and commercial success, solidifying Favreau's reputation as a director. In 2022, the film was selected for preservation in the United States National Film Registry by the Library of Congress as being "culturally, historically, or aesthetically significant". It is one of three superhero movies to achieve this honor alongside Richard Donner's Superman and Christopher Nolan's The Dark Knight. Iron Man was the first Marvel-produced movie under their alliance with Paramount, and Favreau served as the director and an executive producer. During early scenes in Iron Man, Favreau appears as Tony Stark's driver, Happy Hogan. He wrote two issues of a planned mini-series for Marvel Knights titled Iron Man: Viva Las Vegas, that debuted in September 2008 before being canceled in November 2008. Favreau also directed and executive produced the film's sequel, Iron Man 2. Favreau said in December 2010 that he would not direct Iron Man 3 but remain an executive producer.

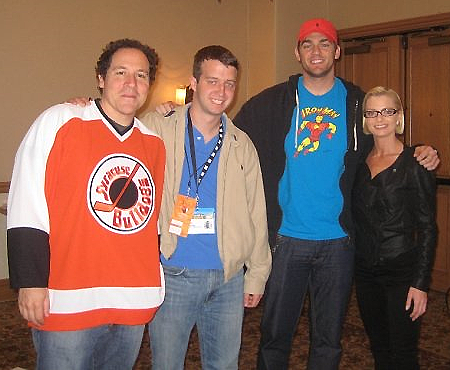
Favreau with Robert McCurdy, Cole Dabney, Jaime Pressly after press junket interview for I Love You, Man at SXSW 2009

Favreau was the third director attached to John Carter, the film adaptation of Edgar Rice Burroughs' swashbuckling space hero. While he did not ultimately direct it, he did appear in a cameo in the film, as a bookie.

In 2008, he played Denver, a bully-type bigger brother to Vaughn in Four Christmases. Favreau co-starred in 2009's Couples Retreat, a comedy chronicling four couples who partake in therapy sessions at a tropical island resort, which he wrote. The film saw him co-star with Vaughn again, while Kristin Davis played his wife. He voices the character Pre Vizsla, the leader of the Mandalorian Death Watch, in the animated series, Star Wars: The Clone Wars. In September 2009, he signed up to direct Cowboys & Aliens based on the graphic novel of the same name created by Scott Mitchell Rosenberg. The science fiction Western film was released in 2011, starring Daniel Craig and Harrison Ford, and is considered to be a financial disappointment, taking $174.8 million in box office receipts on a $163 million budget and received mixed reviews, with critics generally praising its acting while criticizing other aspects.

In 2012, Favreau directed the pilot for the NBC show, Revolution, and served as one of the show's executive producers, alongside J. J. Abrams. In 2013, Favreau directed an episode (Season 9, Episode 16) of NBC's The Office. That same year he filmed a pilot for a TV series based on the novel About a Boy, but set in San Francisco. He also directed the Destiny trailer "The Law of the Jungle".

In 2014, Favreau wrote, co-produced, directed, and starred in Chef. Favreau played a chef who, after a public altercation with a food critic, quits his job at a popular Los Angeles restaurant to operate a food truck with his young son. It co-stars Sofía Vergara, John Leguizamo, Scarlett Johansson, Oliver Platt, Bobby Cannavale and Dustin Hoffman, along with Robert Downey Jr. in a cameo role. Favreau wrote the script after directing several big-budget films, wanting to go "back to basics" and to create a film about cooking. It was well received by critics, who praised the direction, music, writing, story, and performances grossing $45 million against a production budget of $11 million.

=== 2016–present: Franchise work ===
Favreau directed and produced the live-action adaptation of The Jungle Book, for Walt Disney Pictures, which was released on April 15, 2016, to critical and commercial acclaim. That same year, it was reported that Favreau would direct a CGI adaptation of Disney's The Lion King, marking his first time directing a musical. Donald Glover voiced Simba, and James Earl Jones reprised his role as Mufasa from the original film. The film was released in July 2019. On July 29, The Lion King surpassed The Jungle Book to become Favreau's highest-grossing film as director, while also surpassing the original film. Simultaneous with his directorial projects, he worked as a consultant on 24 episodes of The Orville from 2017 to 2019.

He returned as Happy Hogan in the film Spider-Man: Homecoming (2017), and co-executive produced Avengers: Infinity War (2018). Favreau filmed a scene for Avengers: Infinity War, but was cut, ending up on the Blu-Ray release. In 2017, Favreau directed the pilot episode of CBS' Young Sheldon. On March 8, 2018, Lucasfilm announced that Favreau would executive produce and write a live-action Star Wars television series, titled The Mandalorian, for Disney+. The series premiered on November 12, 2019, alongside the streaming service and was co-produced by Favreau's production company Golem Creations. Jon Favreau also lent his voice to the character of Paz Vizsla, who was portrayed by Tait Fletcher.

During that same year, Favreau appeared in Solo: A Star Wars Story voicing Rio Durant, "a very cool and important alien character" and member of Beckett's crew. In the 2019 film Avengers: Endgame, Favreau reprised his role as Happy Hogan in a cameo near the end of the film. The film, directed by the Russo brothers, was executive-produced by Favreau. Avengers: Endgame was released on April 26, 2019. In 2019, Favreau also appeared in the sequel to Spider-Man: Homecoming, Spider-Man: Far From Home.

In May of the same year, it was also announced that Favreau would co-host and executive produce a cooking show for Netflix along with co-host Roy Choi, called The Chef Show. It premiered in June 2019. In December 2021 and July 2024, Favreau reprised his role as Happy Hogan in Spider-Man: No Way Home and Deadpool & Wolverine. In May 2022, Favreau produced the documentary series Prehistoric Planet alongside the BBC Studios Natural History Unit for Apple TV+.

In January 2024, Lucasfilm announced that a feature film titled The Mandalorian and Grogu was in active development, with Favreau directing, writing, and co-producing alongside Kathleen Kennedy and Dave Filoni. The film released on May 22 2026.

In March 2025, it was reported that Favreau was developing a live-action animation hybrid series based on Oswald the Lucky Rabbit for Disney+ as writer and producer.

=== Appearances ===
Favreau has a chapter giving advice in Tim Ferriss' book Tools of Titans.

== Unreleased projects ==
In 1997, Favreau was working on a Miramax project The Marshal of Revelation, an offbeat Western featuring "a Hasidic Jewish gunslinger."

A motion-captured animated film titled Neanderthals was in development at Sony Pictures Animation in the mid-2000s that Favreau would have written and produced, but the project was cancelled sometime in 2008 after four years in development.

In November 2010, it was reported that Favreau would direct a film titled Magic Kingdom, based on The Walt Disney Company's theme park of the same name. In July 2012, Favreau reported that he was officially working on the film. In 2014, he stated that he still had interest in the project, and that he could direct it after finishing filming The Jungle Book (2016).

In October 2012, Favreau was attached to direct the racing film Battle for Bonneville about the story of Art and Walt Arfons, with Ryan Reynolds set to star as one of the leads. New Regency was in negotiations to acquire the package. The script was written by Dan Gilroy. Favreau also was additionally developing to direct Jersey Boys at the time, and wanted to follow it with Battle for Bonneville.

In November 2012, it was said that Favreau – along with David Fincher, Brad Bird, Matthew Vaughn and Ben Affleck – was being considered to direct Star Wars: The Force Awakens, but the choice fell on J. J. Abrams. In June 2015, Favreau stated that although he would not be working on the Star Wars anthology films, he could work on future Star Wars movies at some point. Favreau later worked with the franchise on the live action series The Mandalorian.

In December 2013, Will Ferrell stated that he did not want to make a sequel to Elf. Despite this, during an interview in January 2016, Favreau stated that a sequel could possibly be made. The next month however, Ferrell reiterated that it was unlikely that the sequel would happen and that he still did not want to return to the role.

In April 2016, it was reported that Favreau would return to direct the sequel to his critically acclaimed live-action adaptation of The Jungle Book. Early pre-production of the sequel had begun by June 12, 2018, with Justin Marks, who wrote the previous film, having written an early draft for the film.

== Personal life ==
Favreau married Joya Tillem, a physician, on November 24, 2000. The couple have a son and two daughters. Tillem is the niece of lawyer/talk show host Len Tillem.

Favreau credits the role-playing game Dungeons & Dragons with giving him "a really strong background in imagination, storytelling, understanding how to create tone and a sense of balance."

== Golem Creations ==
Golem Creations Ltd. LLC is a television production company created by Jon Favreau on August 30, 2018. In an interview with The Hollywood Reporter, Favreau cited his fascination with the overlap of technology and storytelling and that he gave the company its name because a golem was like technology; it could be used to protect or destroy if control was lost of it. The company most recently produced The Mandalorian, The Book of Boba Fett, Ahsoka, and Star Wars: Skeleton Crew television shows, in partnership with Lucasfilm, and the Apple TV+ documentary series Prehistoric Planet.

== Filmography ==
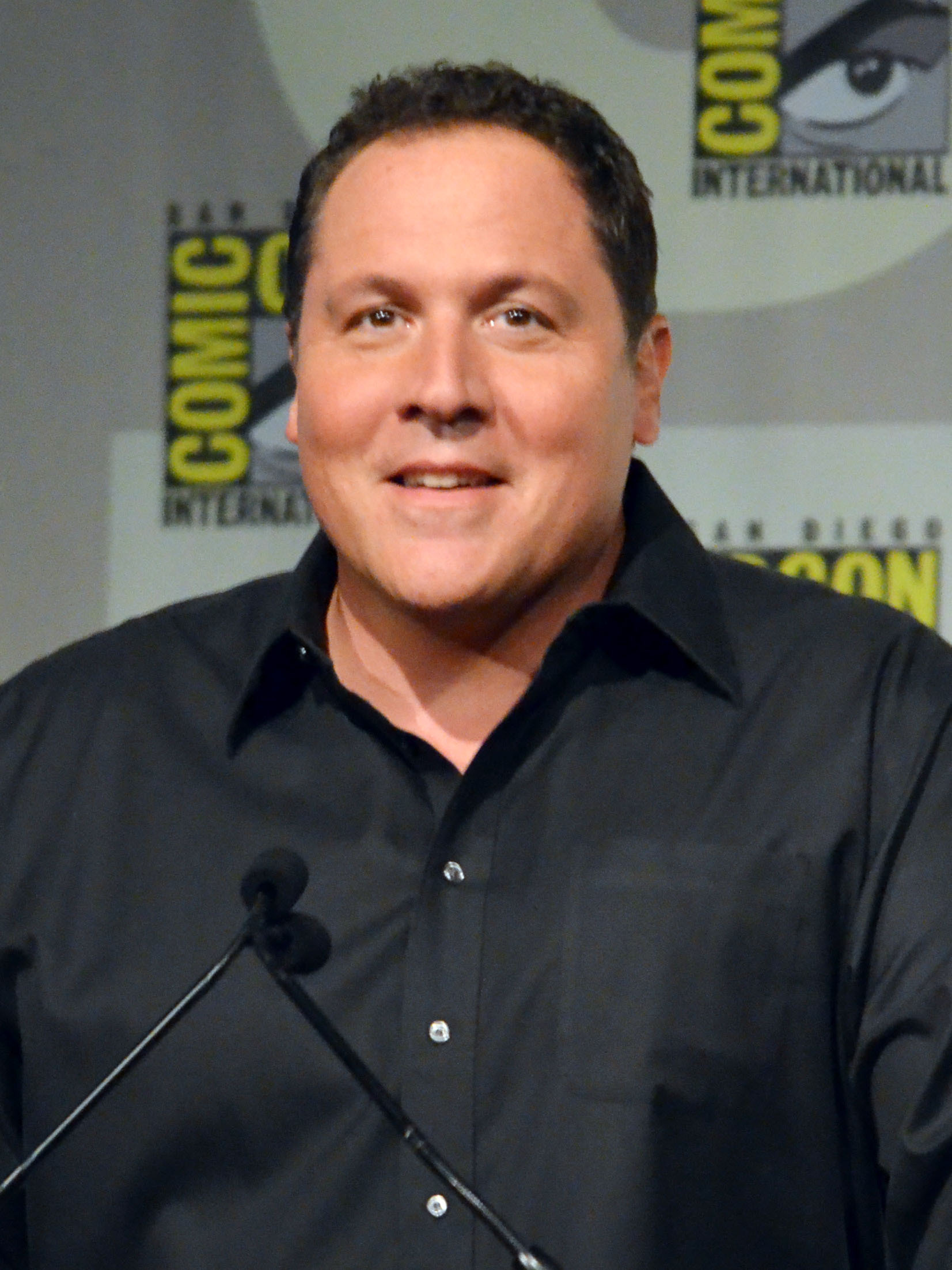
Favreau at the 2012 San Diego Comic-Con

Directed features
Year	Title	Distributor
2001	Made	Artisan Entertainment
2003	Elf	New Line Cinema
2005	Zathura: A Space Adventure	Sony Pictures Releasing
2008	Iron Man	Paramount Pictures / Marvel Studios
2010	Iron Man 2	Paramount Pictures / Marvel Studios
2011	Cowboys & Aliens	Universal Pictures / Paramount Pictures
2014	Chef	Open Road Films
2016	The Jungle Book	Walt Disney Studios Motion Pictures
2019	The Lion King	Walt Disney Studios Motion Pictures
2026	The Mandalorian and Grogu	Walt Disney Studios Motion Pictures

== Awards and recognition ==
In May 2019, it was announced that Favreau would be named a Disney Legend at the 2019 D23 Expo for his outstanding contributions to The Walt Disney Company.

On February 13, 2023, Favreau received the 2,746th star on the Hollywood Walk of Fame.

Award	Year	Category	Work	Result	Ref.
Children's and Family Emmy Awards	2026	Outstanding Young Teen Series	Star Wars: Skeleton Crew	Won	
Critics' Choice Movie Awards	2015	Best Actor in a Comedy	Chef	Nominated	
Directors Guild of America Awards	2020	Outstanding Directing in Reality Programs	The Chef Show	Nominated	
Directors Guild of America Awards	2021	Outstanding Directing in Dramatic Series	The Mandalorian	Nominated	
Directors Guild of America Awards	2021	Outstanding Directing in Reality Programs	The Chef Show	Nominated	
Golden Globe Awards	2020	Best Animated Feature Film	The Lion King	Nominated	
Golden Globe Awards	2021	Best Television Series – Drama	The Mandalorian	Nominated	
Grammy Awards	2020	Best Compilation Soundtrack for Visual Media	The Lion King	Nominated	
Hugo Awards	2009	Dramatic Presentation — Long Form	Iron Man	Nominated	
Hugo Awards	2020	Dramatic Presentation — Short Form	The Mandalorian (episode: "Chapter 8: Redemption")	Nominated	
Hugo Awards	2021	Dramatic Presentation — Short Form	The Mandalorian (episode: "Chapter 16: The Rescue")	Nominated	
Primetime Emmy Awards	2005	Outstanding Nonfiction Series	Dinner for Five	Nominated	
Primetime Emmy Awards	2020	Outstanding Drama Series	The Mandalorian (season 1)	Nominated	
Primetime Emmy Awards	2021	Outstanding Drama Series	The Mandalorian (season 2)	Nominated	
Primetime Emmy Awards	2021	Outstanding Directing for a Drama Series	The Mandalorian (episode: "Chapter 9: The Marshal")	Nominated	
Primetime Emmy Awards	2021	Outstanding Writing for a Drama Series	The Mandalorian (episode: "Chapter 16: The Rescue")	Nominated	
Producers Guild of America Awards	2021	Outstanding Producer of Episodic Television, Drama	The Mandalorian (season 2)	Nominated	
Saturn Awards	2009	Best Director	Iron Man	Won	
Saturn Awards	2016	Best Director	The Jungle Book	Nominated	
Saturn Awards	2019	The Visionary Award	—	Won	
Visual Effects Society Awards	2018	Lifetime Achievement Award	—	Won	
Writers Guild of America Awards	2021	Best Drama Series	The Mandalorian	Nominated	

== See also ==
- List of Queens College people
