= Made (2001 film) =

2001 comedy/crime film by Jon Favreau

- Theatrical release poster
- Directed by: Jon Favreau
- Written by: Jon Favreau
- Produced by: Jon Favreau; Vince Vaughn; Peter Billingsley
- Starring: Jon Favreau; Vince Vaughn; Peter Falk; Sean Combs; Famke Janssen; Faizon Love
- Cinematography: Christopher Doyle
- Edited by: Curtiss Clayton
- Music by: John O'Brien; Lyle Workman
- Distributed by: Artisan Entertainment (United States); Summit Entertainment (International)
- Release date: July 13, 2001
- Running time: 94 minutes
- Country: United States
- Language: English
- Budget: $5 million
- Box office: $5.5 million

Made is a 2001 American crime comedy film written, directed and co-produced by Jon Favreau. It stars Favreau, Vince Vaughn, Peter Falk, and Sean Combs. It was both Favreau's feature directorial debut and Combs's acting debut. Made was released on July 13, 2001 by Artisan Entertainment in the United States, with Summit Entertainment releasing in other territories. The film received positive reviews from critics and grossed $5.5 million against a $5 million budget.

== Plot ==
In Los Angeles, Bobby is an amateur boxer with ties to local mob boss Max. Between his lackluster boxing career and working as a mason on Max's construction projects, Bobby struggles to support his girlfriend Jessica, a stripper in Max’s employ, and her daughter Chloe. After Bobby beats up a handsy customer at a bachelor party, his associate Horrace is assigned to escort Jessica instead. Max dispatches Bobby on a new job and, against his better judgment, Bobby vouches for his ne'er-do-well childhood friend Ricky to join him.

Bobby and Ricky are sent to New York City to act as silent muscle for a money laundering deal with Max’s East Coast partner, Ruiz. The cautious Bobby is determined to follow Max’s orders to the letter, and tries to keep the loudmouth Ricky in line. Insisting on living large, Ricky infuriates a flight attendant and humiliates a hotel clerk. They meet Jimmy, their driver, and Horrace arrives with a motorcycle gang to bring them to Ruiz.

Ricky makes a disastrous first impression on Ruiz and his criminal contact, Tom “the Welshman”. Convincing Bobby to overindulge at a club, Ricky fails to seduce women at their SoHo hotel. Having already lost Max’s trust, Ricky grows suspicious of Ruiz and insists on acquiring a gun, but Bobby refuses. Despite his low opinion of the pair, Ruiz sends them to show the Welshman a good time. With the help of cocaine from Horrace, the friends manage to arrange a deal between Ruiz and the Welshman.

On the day of the meeting, Ricky has disappeared, leading Bobby to suspect he has been killed by Jimmy on Ruiz’s orders. Bobby and Horrace deliver $200,000 to a bar in Red Hook, Brooklyn, where the Welshman has hired the Westies for protection. The Westies double-cross them, but Ricky arrives and holds the gangsters at gunpoint, until one recognizes Ricky's weapon as a starter pistol and a fight breaks out. Jimmy intervenes with a real gun and sends the boys away while he deals with the Westies.

The friends return to Max, who keeps Ricky’s payment as compensation for a truck he previously stole. He offers to bring Bobby even deeper into his criminal organization, but Bobby severs ties with Max and surrenders his own payment to cover Jessica’s debts. Arriving home, he discovers Jessica in bed with a client and snorting cocaine. Bobby tries to convince Jessica to clean up her act for Chloe's sake, but Jessica refuses and asks that he take custody of Chloe. Six months later, Bobby and Ricky bicker as they celebrate Chloe’s birthday at Chuck E. Cheese's, now raising her together.

== Cast ==
- Jon Favreau as Bobby
- Vince Vaughn as Ricky
- Sean Combs as Ruiz
- Famke Janssen as Jessica
- Faizon Love as Horrace
- David O'Hara as The Welshman
- Vincent Pastore as Jimmy
- Peter Falk as Max
- Makenzie Vega as Chloe
- Tom Morello as Best Man
- Jonathan Silverman as Bachelor
- Kimberley Davies as Bartender
- Gary Auerbach as Husband
- Bill Capizzi as Arthur
- Leonardo Cimino as Leo
- Federico Castelluccio as Doorman
- Matt O'Dwyer as Doorman #2
- Jason Fabini as Doorman #3
- Jamie Harris as Rogue
- Dustin Diamond as Himself (uncredited)
- Sam Rockwell as Hotel Clerk (uncredited)
- Jennifer Esposito as Club Girl (uncredited)
- Bud Cort as Bernardo (uncredited)

== Connections to other films ==
Because the film is written by Jon Favreau and stars Favreau and Vince Vaughn, it is commonly misinterpreted as a sequel to Swingers. The license plate of Jimmy's Limo, "DBLDN11," is a reference to a blackjack strategy articulated in Swingers that one should "always double down on an 11."

During Dustin Diamond's cameo, Ricky refers to him as "Screech," referencing Diamond's character on Saved by the Bell.

== Reception ==
The critical reception of the film was generally positive, receiving a 70% approval rating at Rotten Tomatoes based on 105 reviews, with an average score of 6.3/10. The site's consensus reads "Not as good as Swingers, but it's still witty and goofy enough for some laughs." Metacritic, which uses a weighted average, assigned the film a score of 62 out of 100, based on 24 critics, indicating "generally favorable" reviews.

The film received a limited release in the United States and had almost no release overseas. It had a world box office gross of $5.5 million.
