= Meyer Davis (company) =

Interior design boutique (e. 1999)

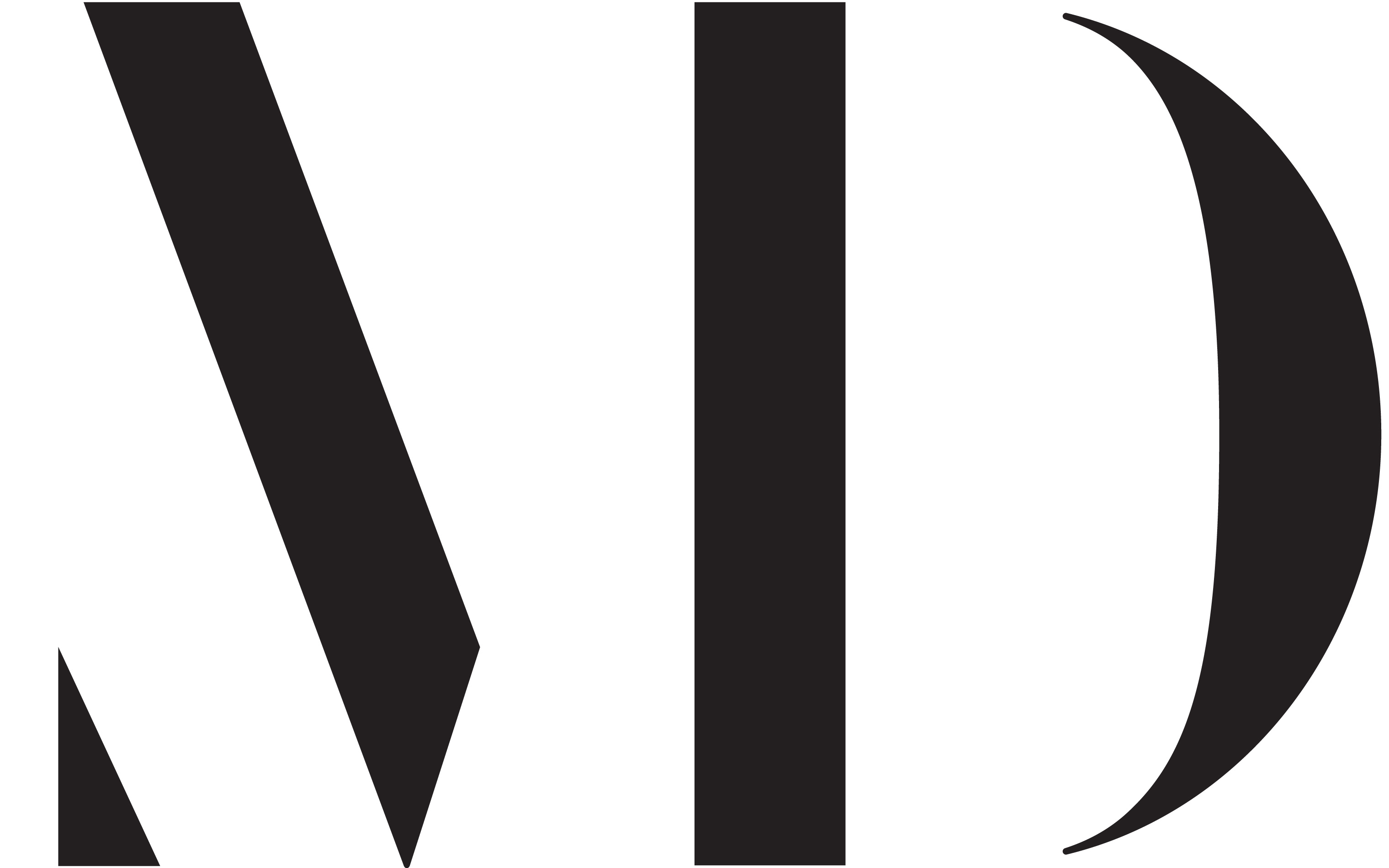
- Industry: Interior design
- Founded: 1999
- Founders: Will Meyer and Gray Davis
- Headquarters: New York, NY, USA
- Area served: Worldwide
- Website: www.meyerdavis.com

Meyer Davis is an interior design boutique with offices in New York City, Los Angeles, Miami, and London. Founded in 1999 by friends Will Meyer and Gray Davis, the firm specializes equally in residential, hospitality, retail, and workplace design, and has over seventy full-time interior designers, project managers, industrial designers, and virtual designers on staff.

== History ==
Will Meyer and Gray Davis are natives of Nashville, Tennessee, and both attended Auburn University College of Architecture, Design, and Construction in Alabama prior to moving to New York City. Davis began his career in Montgomery, Alabama, at the office of his professor, Bobby McAlpine, and moved to New York City following college to work first for John Saladino, and later for Thomas O’Brien’s Aero Studios, where he designed for clients including Giorgio Armani and Ralph and Ricky Lauren. Upon moving to New York, Meyer trained with architects Peter Eisenman and his mentor Charles Gwathmey, working on homes for the likes of Steven Spielberg and Michael Dell.

Meyer and Davis were connected in New York by mutual friends and colleagues, and eventually began consulting with one another on freelance projects, leading them to formally establish Meyer Davis in their first SoHo office in 1999. Their collaborative studio began with a commission for a residence in Tennessee and a nightclub in Las Vegas, and quickly led to work for Oscar de la Renta (boutiques worldwide), Andrew Carmellini (Locanda Verde at the Greenwich Hotel), and John Varvatos (boutiques nationwide). Other notable clients of Meyer Davis have included Jonathan Tisch (Loews Hotels), Aby Rosen (Paramount Hotel), Barry Sternlicht (1 Hotels), the Frist Family (private offices and residence) and Jenna Lyons (private residence). The pair have also collaborated on numerous private residences in Upstate New York and East Hampton.

Along with designing for numerous private residential clients, Meyer Davis has collaborated with chefs and restaurateurs like John McDonald and Chef Josh Capon, Chef Michael White and Altamarea Group, Chef Ford Fry, Chef Andrew Carmellini, Chef Michael Schwartz, Starr Restaurants, and SBE. Meyer Davis has been selected by a wide variety of brands worldwide to design hotels and residential developments; clients include Four Seasons, Rosewood Hotels, Auberge, Arlo, Loews, 1 Hotels, W Hotels, Le Méridien, The Ritz Carlton, and The Related Companies, as well as numerous boutique hotel and development groups. The studio has also designed retail and office environments for Oscar de la Renta, Dwell Studio, John Varvatos, Morgenthal Frederics, Snapchat, and The Assemblage.

== Notable projects ==
- Sorelle; Charleston, South Carolina
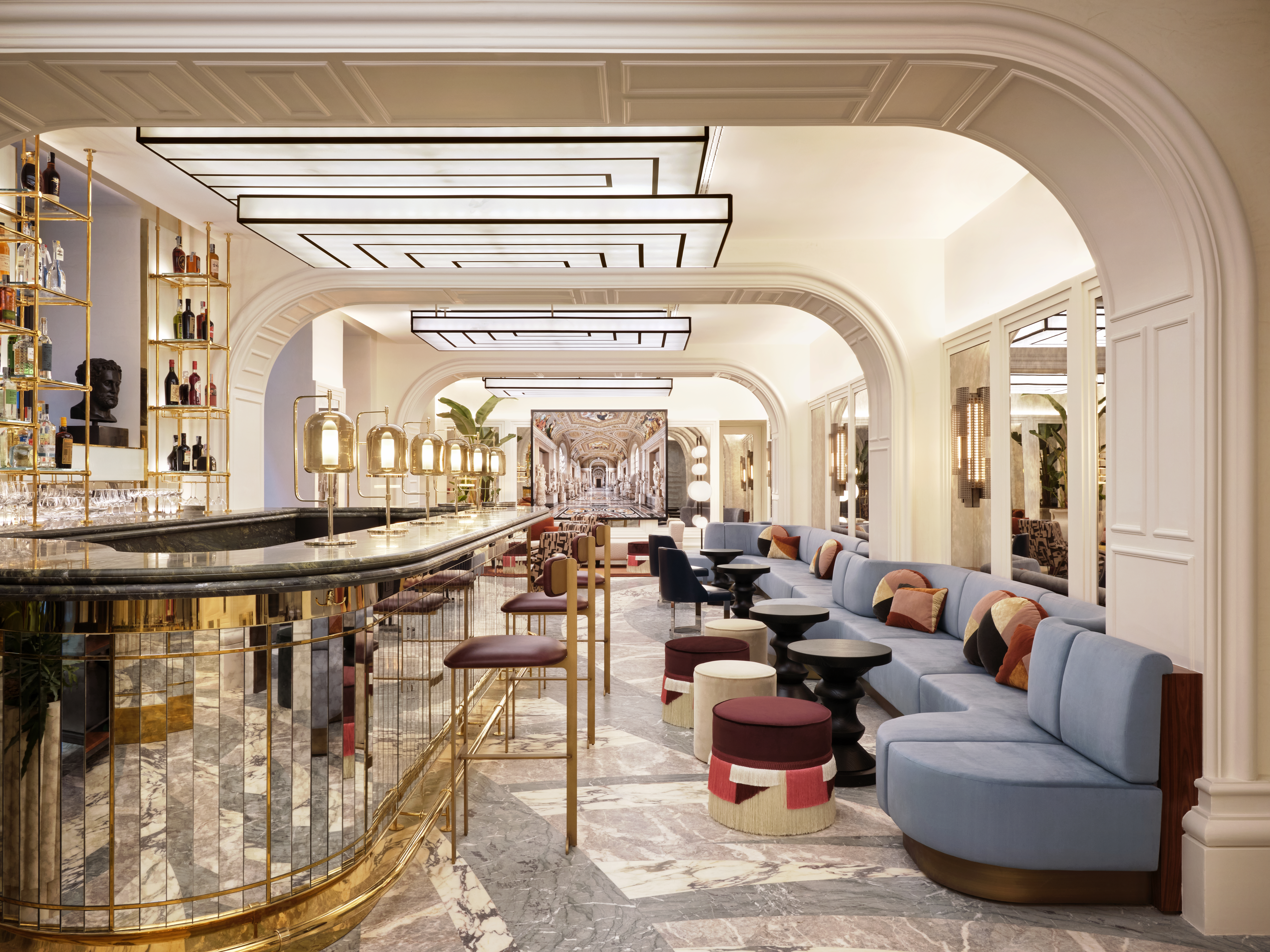
- W Rome Lounge Bar
  W Rome; Rome, Italy
- Grand Hyatt Kuwait; Kuwait City, Kuwait
- Etereo Auberge; Riviera Maya, Mexico
- Marcus at Baha Mar; Nassau, Bahamas
- Arlo Midtown; New York, New York
- Nearly Ninth; New York, New York
- Samos at the Ritz Carlton; Mexico City, Mexico
- Crown Hotel; Sydney, Australia
- One Barangaroo; Sydney, Australia
- Mr. C Residences; Miami, Florida
- The River House; Nashville, Tennessee
- Yerba Buena Island; San Francisco, California
- Rosewood Little Dix Bay; Virgin Gorda, British Virgin Islands
- Mauna Lani, Kamuela, Hawaii
- Carna Baha Mar; Nassau, Bahamas
- Four Seasons Arion; Athens, Greece
- Dream Printers Alley; Nashville, Tennessee
- Harrod's Social; London, England
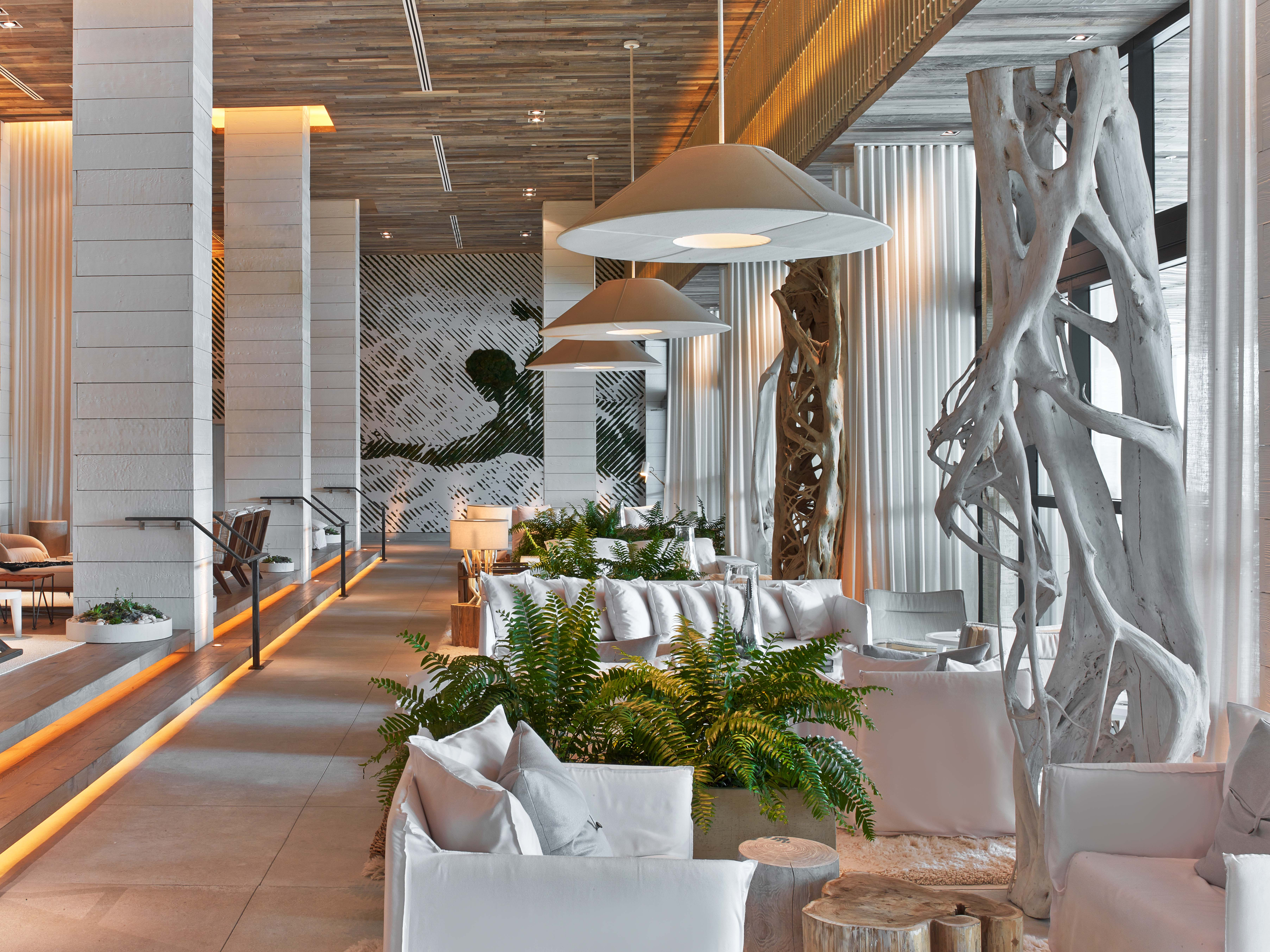
  1 Hotel South Beach Lobby
  1 Hotel; Miami, Florida
- Oscar de la Renta; worldwide[15]
- St. Cecilia; Atlanta, Georgia[16]
- One Barangaroo; Sydney, Australia
- Four Seasons; Papagayo, Costa Rica
- Park Grove; Miami, Florida
- Auberge Beach Residences and Spa; Fort Lauderdale, Florida
- Tennessee Farmhouse (private residence); Nashville, Tennessee
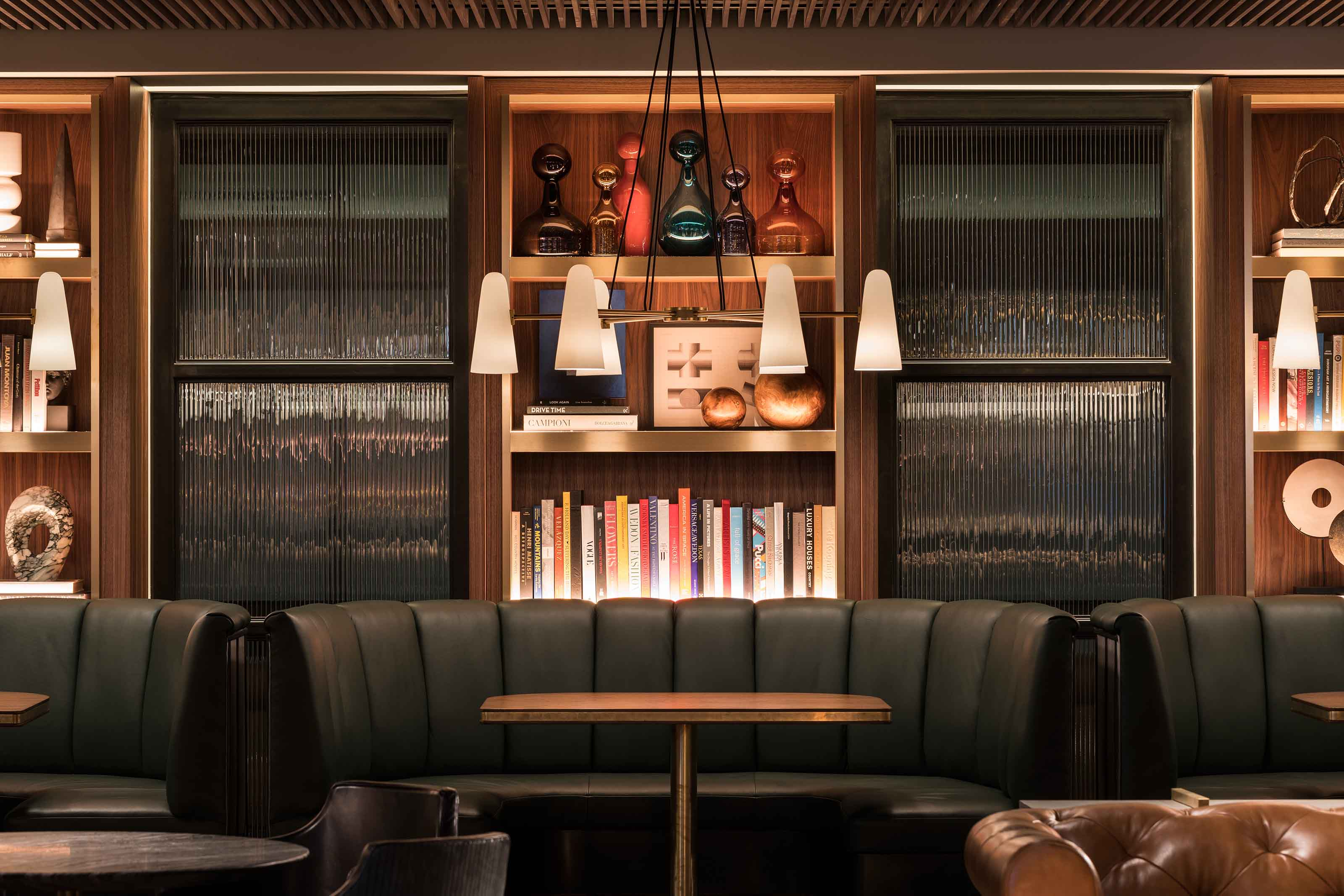
  Four Seasons Houston
  Four Seasons; Houston, Texas
- Bowery Meat Company; New York, NY
- Casa Dragones Tasting Room; San Miguel de Allende, Mexico
- Paramount Hotel; New York, NY
- Proxi; Chicago, Illinois
- The Assemblage; New York, NY
- Boqueria; New York, NY
- Amagansett Beach House; Amagansett, NY

== Made to Measure ==
The Vendome Press published Meyer Davis’s first monograph in October, 2016: Made to Measure: Meyer Davis, Architecture and Interiors. Written by New York Times Style founding editor Dan Shaw, and with a foreword by writer and designer David Netto, the book illustrates the studio’s practice in both residential (private) and hospitality (public) design.

== William Gray ==
Meyer and Davis debuted their eponymous product company, William Gray, in 2020. The William Gray collections include a wide range of furnishings for dining and lounge produced by Stellar Works, two highly interpretive wallcovering lines for Calico wallpaper, a re-launch of two enterprising families of lighting with Rich Brilliant Willing, ambitiously developed bath collections for Claybrook, and a capsule collection of light fixtures for Contardi.

== Awards and honors ==
Meyer Davis has received awards from Hospitality Design, Boutique Design, NYCxDESIGN (presented by Interior Design and ICFF), and the James Beard Foundation. Notable honors include being inducted into the Interior Design Hall of Fame in 2022, and in November 2018, Meyer Davis was one of four industry professionals inducted into Hospitality Design’s Platinum Circle hall of fame.

Notable awards include Interior Design’s Best of Year Award for One Park Grove, NYC x Design Award for Nearly Ninth, AHEAD Awards for Mauna Lani in 2020, a James Beard Award for restaurant design in 2017 for St Cecelia.
