= Ford Fry =

American chef and restaurateur

Ford Fry (born June 17, 1969) is an American chef and restaurateur based in Atlanta, Georgia. He owns 23 restaurants across the US including 13 restaurants in Georgia, three restaurants in Houston, two in Charlotte and two in Nashville. Fry's portfolio of restaurants includes JCT. Kitchen & Bar, no. 246, The Optimist, St. Cecilia, Little Rey, Superica, Marcel State of Grace, BeetleCat, and La Lucha. Several of Fry's restaurants have received various accolades. In October 2015, CBS This Morning described Fry as "one of the most prolific chefs and restaurateurs" in the United States. In March 2021, Atlanta Eats dubbed Fry "a peerless restaurateur with many beloved brands."

== Biography ==
Fry was raised in Texas and in his early life he studied at the New England Culinary Institute in Vermont. He then worked as a chef in fine dining in the U.S. states of Florida, Colorado, California, and Georgia. In January 2007, he based himself in Atlanta and opened his first restaurant, the JCT. Kitchen & Bar. Fry currently resides in Roswell, Georgia, with his wife and two sons. In his spare time, he enjoys playing guitar and spending time with his family.

== Accolades ==
Fry was a semifinalist for the 2013, 2014, 2015, 2016, and 2017 James Beard Foundation Outstanding Restaurateur Award. Eater Atlanta named Fry as the "Empire Builder of the Year" in 2013, and Fry also won the Georgia Restaurant Association's seventh annual Crystal of Excellence (GRACE) Award for Restaurateur of the Year in 2013.

The Optimist restaurant was selected as Esquire magazine's Best New Restaurant of the Year in 2012. Fry has been asked to cook at the James Beard house numerous times. and Condé Nast Traveler named the restaurant one of the 50 best new restaurants in the world. Bon Appetit magazine named it the #7 best new restaurant in America in 2013. Esquire magazine named King + Duke restaurant as one of the best new restaurants of 2013.

In 2017 the firm that designed St. Cecilia, Meyer Davis, won the James Beard award for Outstanding Restaurant Design in North America (76 seats and over).

== Establishments ==
=== Atlanta Restaurants ===
- Superica (Tex-Mex)
- The Optimist (Seafood)
- Marcel (Steakhouse)
- St. Cecilia (Italian/Seafood)
- Little Rey (Tex-Mex/Grill)
- Beetlecat (Seafood/Cocktails
- No. 246 (Italian)
- Little Sparrow & Bar Blanc (French)
- The El Felix (Tex-Mex)

=== Houston Restaurants ===
- State of Grace (Southern)
- La Lucha (Gulf Coast)
- Superica (Tex-Mex)

=== Nashville Restaurants ===
- The Optimist (Seafood)
- Superica (Tex-Mex)
- Le Loup (French/Cocktails)
- Star Rover Sound (Tex-Mex)

=== Charlotte Restaurants ===
- Superica (Tex-Mex)
