= Kelly Fields =

American chef

- Born: Ohio
- Occupation: Pastry chef
- Notable work: Owner of Restaurant Willa Jean, Author of "The Good Book of Southern Baking"
- Awards: James Beard Award for Outstanding Pastry Chef, 2016 Eater New Orleans "Chef of the Year," Dessert Professional Magazine "“Top Ten Pastry Chefs in North America.”

Kelly Fields is an American chef based in New Orleans.

== Career ==
She is the owner of a bakery/restaurant named after her grandmother, Willa Jean, which is located in New Orleans. Before Fields opened up her restaurant, Willa Jean, she worked for celebrity chef, John Besh. Kelly fields told The Tennessean in an interview that one of her goals in opening Willa Jean was to create a safe and welcoming workplace environment, something she states she did not get in her earlier years. In her restaurant now, there is a ratio of 9:1 female/male staff.

== Published works ==
She is the author of The Good Book of Southern Baking, published in 2020.

=== Reception ===
Fields has received recognition from Bon Appetit, The New York Times Book Review, and The LA Times, regarding her newly published cookbook as "one of the best cookbooks of the year".

== Recognition ==
Fields was named "Chef of the Year" by Eater New Orleans. She received the James Beard Award for Outstanding Pastry Chef in 2019.
