= Cucharamama =

Defunct restaurant in Hoboken, New Jersey, U.S.

- Interactive map of Cucharamama

Restaurant information
- Established: 2004
- Closed: 2020
- Location: 233 Clinton Street, Hoboken, New Jersey, 07030, United States
- Coordinates: 40°44′26″N 74°02′04″W

Cucharamama was a Latin-American themed restaurant and bar in Hoboken, New Jersey. It opened in 2004 and closed in 2020, due to the COVID-19 pandemic.
