= City House (restaurant) =

Restaurant in Nashville, Tennessee, U.S.

- Interactive map of City House

Restaurant information
- Location: 1222 4th Ave. N., Nashville, Tennessee, 37208, United States
- Coordinates: 36°10′37″N 86°47′14″W

City House is a restaurant in Nashville, Tennessee. Chef Tandy Wilson opened the restaurant in 2007. City House was included in The New York Times's 2024 list of the 22 best pizzerias in the U.S.
