= Bluestem (restaurant) =

Defunct restaurant in Kansas City, U.S.

- Interactive map of Bluestem

Restaurant information
- Location: 900 Westport Road, Kansas City, Missouri, 64111, United States
- Coordinates: 39°3′3″N 94°35′49″W

Bluestem was a restaurant in Kansas City, in the United States.
