= Tatiana =

Feminine given name

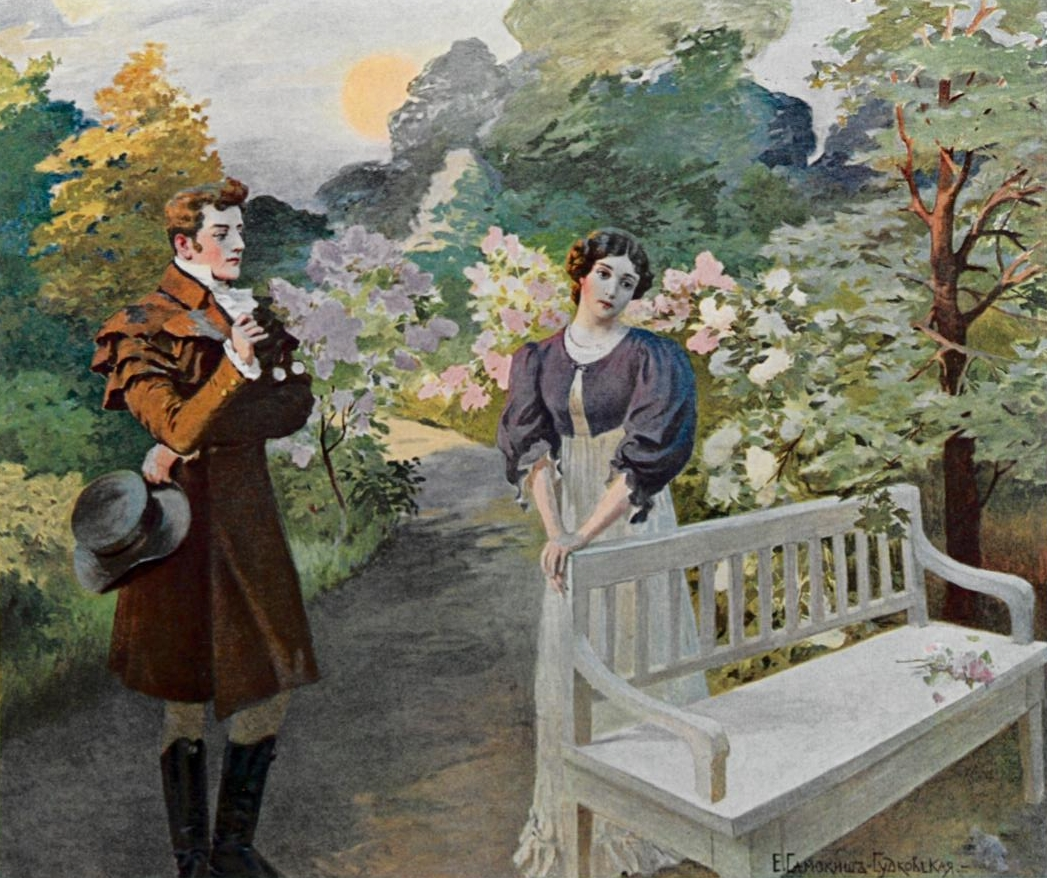
- Onegin and Tatiana, from an illustrated edition of Eugene Onegin by Elena Samokysh-Sudkovskaya.
- Pronunciation: Russian: [tɐˈtʲjanə]
- Gender: Female

Origin
- Origin: Roman, Slavic
- Meaning: Roman clan name "Tatius"

Other names
- Related names: Tanya, Tania, Tanja, Tetiana, Tia, Tiana, Tata, Tati, Tutta

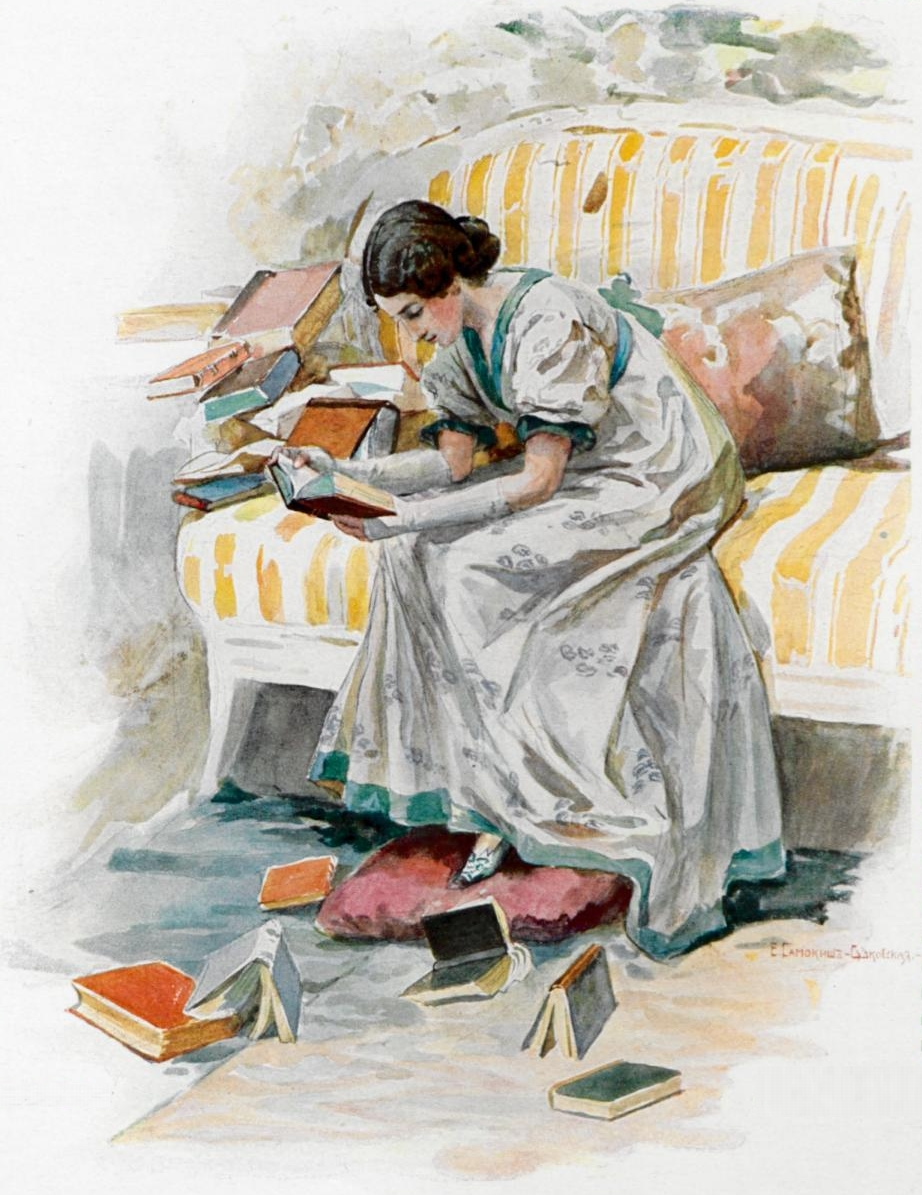
Tatiana from Eugene Onegin by Elena Samokysh-Sudkovskaya, 1899.

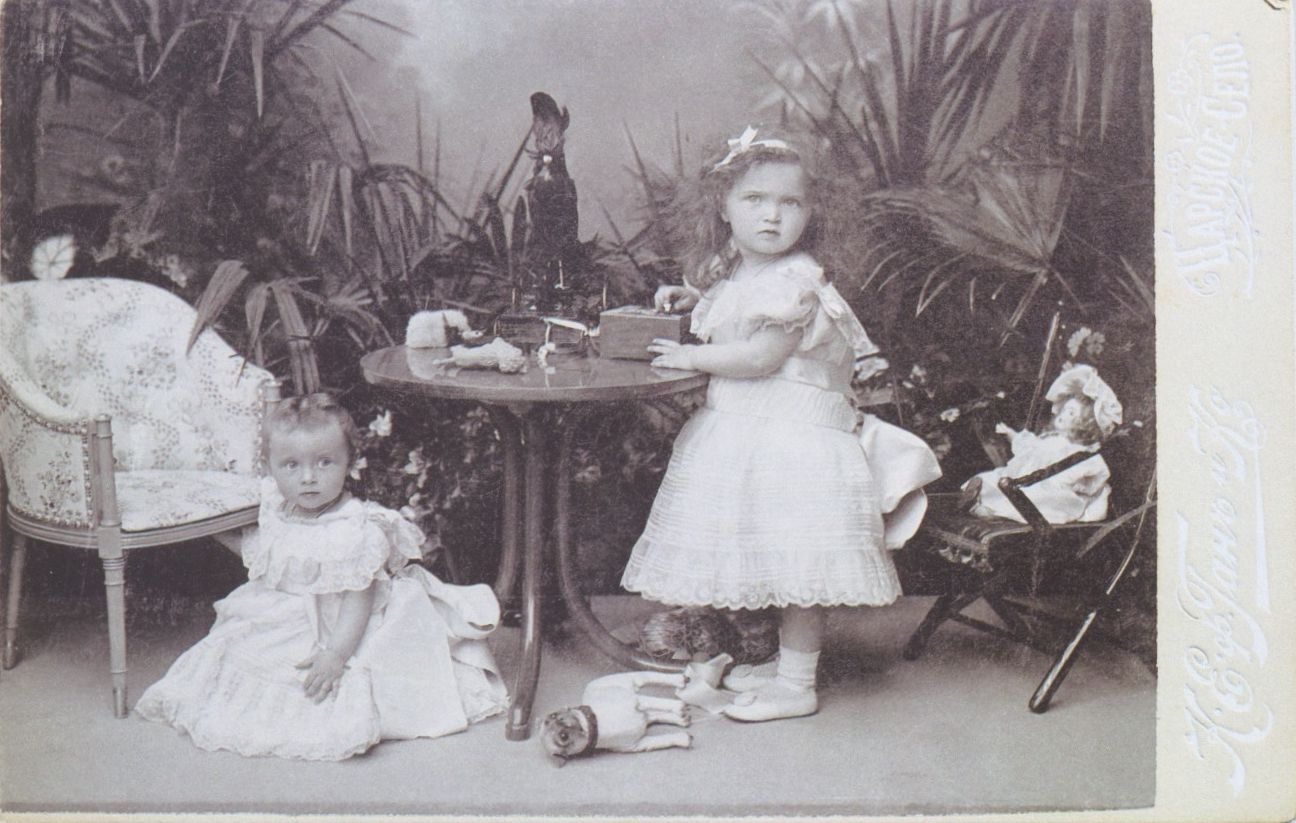
Grand Duchess Olga Nikolaevna of Russia and Grand Duchess Tatiana Nikolaevna of Russia as toddlers. Tatiana (left, sitting) was named for Tatiana Larina in Eugene Onegin because her parents liked the idea of sisters named Olga and Tatiana as in the poem by Alexander Pushkin.

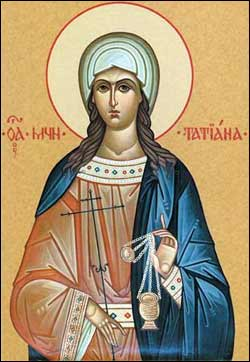
An icon of Saint Tatiana of Rome.

Tatiana (or Tatianna, also romanized as Tatyana, Tatjana, Tatijana, etc.) is a female name of Sabine-Roman origin that became widespread in Eastern Europe.

== Origin ==
Tatiana is a feminine, diminutive derivative of the Sabine—and later Latin—name Tatius. King Titus Tatius was the name of a legendary ruler of the Sabines, an Italic tribe living near Rome around the 8th century BC. After the Romans absorbed the Sabines, the name Tatius remained in use in the Roman world, into the first centuries of Christianity, as well as the masculine diminutive Tatianus and its feminine counterpart, Tatiana.

While the name later disappeared from Western Europe including Italy, it remained prevalent in the Hellenic world of the Eastern Roman Empire, and later spread to the Byzantine-influenced Orthodox world, including Russia. In that context, it originally honoured the church Saint Tatiana, who was tortured and martyred in the persecutions of the Roman Emperor Alexander Severus, c. 230 CE. St. Tatiana is patron saint of students in general and in Russia, students are celebrated on Tatiana Day, 25 January. St. Tatiana is also the patron saint of Moscow State University.

== Variations ==
- Albanian: Tatiana, Tatjana, Tana
- Belarusian: Тацця́на [taˈt͡sʲːana] (Tatsiana; Łacinka: Tacciana), Diminutive: Тáня (Tania), Таця́нка (Tatsianka; Łacinka: Tacianka), Танéчка (Taniechka; Łacinka: Taniečka)
- Bulgarian: Татя́на (Tatyana), Diminutive: Тáня (Tania)
- Catalan: Tatiana; diminutive: Tània
- Croatian: Tatjana, Tanja
- Czech: Taťána, Táňa
- Danish: Tatiana, Tanja
- Dutch: Tanja, Tatjana (uncommon), Tania (uncommon now, only in Belgium)
- English: Tatiana, Tatyana Diminutive: Tania, Tanya, Tiana, Tianna
- Estonian: Tatjana
- Finnish: Tatjana; diminutive: Taina
- French: Tatiana, Tatianna, Tatyanna, Tatienne (uncommon), Diminutive: Tania, Tanya
- Frisian: Tetje Anna (uncommon); diminutive: Tet, Tetje, Tanje
- German: Tatjana, Tanja
- Greek: Τατιανή (Tatiani), Τατιάνα (Tatiana)
- Hungarian: Tatjána
- Italian: Tatiana
- Norwegian: Tatjana
- Polish: Tacjana
- Portuguese: Tatiana, Tatiane; diminutive: Tania, Tati
- Romanian: Tatiana, Tatianna, Diminutive: Tanea
- Russian: Татья́на [tɐˈtʲjanə] (Tatijana), Diminutive: Тáня (Tania), Tanichka, Tanechka, Tatianka, Taniusha, Taniushka
- Serbian Cyrillic: Татјана
- Slovak: Tatiana; diminutive: Táňa
- Slovene: Tatjana; diminutive: Tanja, Tjaša; Variants: Tatiana, Tatijana, Tatja, Tatjanca
- Spanish: Tatiana; diminutive: Tania, Tati
- Ukrainian: Тетя́на [teˈtʲɑnɐ] (Tetiana, Tetyana), Diminutive: Tetianka, Tetyanka

== In popular culture ==
Tatiana Larina is the heroine of Alexander Pushkin's verse novel Eugene Onegin. The poem was and continues to be popular in Russia.

The character of Tatiana Larina inspired the names of two Romanovs: Princess Tatiana Constantinovna of Russia and her distant cousin Grand Duchess Tatiana Nikolaevna of Russia.

== Notable people ==
=== In Christianity ===
- Saint Tatiana, 3rd-century Christian martyr

=== Royalty and nobility ===
- Princess Tatiana Constantinovna of Russia (1890–1979), eldest daughter of Russian poet Grand Duke Constantine Constantinovich of Russia
- Grand Duchess Tatiana Nikolaevna of Russia (1897–1918), the second daughter of Emperor Nicholas II Romanov and Empress Alexandra Feodorovna (Alix of Hesse)
- Princess Tatiana Radziwiłł (1939–2025), daughter of Princess Eugénie of Greece and Denmark
- Princess Tatiana of Greece and Denmark (born 1980), wife of Prince Nikolaos of Greece and Denmark
- Princess Tatiana Galitzine (born 1984), daughter of Archduchess Maria-Anna of Austria
- Tatyana Borisovna Golitsyna (1696–1757), Russian courtier
- Tatiana Vasilyevna Golitsyna (1783–1841), Russian noblewoman and philanthropist
- Tatiana Kharlova (1756–1773), Russian noblewoman
- Tatiana von Metternich-Winneburg (1915–2006), German patron of the arts of Russian birth
- Tatiana Borisovna Potemkina (1797–1869), Russian noblewoman
- Tatiana Tolstoy-Paus (1914–2007), Russian-Swedish socialite

=== In modeling ===
- Tatiana Calmell (born 1994), Peruvian model, actress, and Miss Peru 2024
- Tatiana Cotliar (born 1988), Argentine model and stylist
- Tatiana Dante, fashion model and America's Next Top Model Cycle 4 candidate
- Tatiana Diagileva (born 1991), Belarusian model
- Taťána Kuchařová (born 1987), Czech model, Miss World 2006
- Tatiana Kovylina (born 1981), Russian model
- Tatiana Kumar (born 1998), Malaysian model and Miss World Malaysia 2016
- Tatiana Loor (born 1991), Ecuadorian model and Miss International Ecuador 2012
- Tatiana Najera (born 1988), Colombian model and Miss Colombia 2010 contestant
- Tatjana Patitz (1966–2023), German model
- Tatiana Silva (born 1985), Belgian model
- Tatiana Sorokko (born 1971), Russian model
- Tatiana Torres (born 1988), Ecuadorian model and Miss Earth Ecuador 2012
- Tatiana Usova (born 1987) is a Russian model

=== In television and films ===
- Tatiana (singer) (born 1968), Mexican American actress, singer and television presenter
- Tatjana Alexander, Australian-born German-Austrian actress
- Tatyana Ali (born 1979), American actress and singer
- Tatyana Arntgolts (born 1982), Russian theater and film actress
- Tatyana Barysheva (1896–1979), Soviet actress
- Tatjana Blacher (born 1956), German actress
- Tatiana Calmell, Peruvian actress, model, activist, and beauty pageant titleholder
- Tatiana Capote (born 1962), Cuban-Venezuelan actress
- Tatyana Dogileva (born 1957), Soviet/Russian actress
- Tatjana Đorđević (born 1985), Serbian singer
- Tatiana Doronina (born 1933), Soviet/Russian actress
- Tatyana Drubich (born 1960), Russian actress
- Tatiana Dyková (born 1978), Czech actress
- Tatiana Farnese (1924–2022), Italian actress
- Tatiana Huezo (born 1972), Salvadoran-Mexican film director
- Tatjana Irrah (1892–1949), German silent film actress
- Tatiana Issa (born 1974), Brazilian actress and director
- Tatyana Karpova (1916–2018), Soviet and Russian actress
- Tatjana Kästel (born 1982), German actress
- Tatyana Konyukhova (1931–2024), Soviet actress
- Tatyana Kosmacheva (born 1985), Russian actress
- Tatyana Kravchenko (born 1953), Soviet and Russian actress
- Tatyana Kudryavtseva (born 1953), Russian actress
- Tatiana Kulíšková (born 1961), Slovak actress and television presenter
- Tatyana Lavrova (1938–2007), Soviet and Russian actress
- Tatyana Lioznova (1924–2011), Soviet film director and screenwriter
- Tatyana Lolova (1934–2021), Bulgarian actress
- Tatyana Lyutaeva (born 1965), Soviet, Lithuanian and Russian theater actress
- Tatiana Martínez (born 1991), Mexican actress
- Tatiana Maslany (born 1985), Canadian actress
- Taťjana Medvecká (born 1953), Czech actress
- Tatiana Okunevskaya (1914–2002), Soviet and Russian actress
- Tatiana Ouliankina (born 1970), Russian actress
- Tatiana Papamoschou (born 1964), Greek actress
- Tatiana Pauhofová (born 1983), Slovak actress
- Tatyana Pavlova (1890–1975), Russian theater director
- Tatyana Pelttser (1904–1992), Soviet and Russian actress
- Tatyana Piletskaya (born 1928), Soviet and Russian actress
- Tatyana Protsenko (1968–2021), Soviet actress
- Tatiana S. Riegel, American film editor
- Tatjana Sais (1910–1981), German film actress
- Tatiana Samoilova (1934-2014), Soviet/Russian actress
- Tatianna, stage name of Joseph Santolini (born 1987), American drag queen and reality personality
- Tatjana Saphira, born Tatjana Hartmann (born 1997), Indonesian actress
- Tatyana Shmyga (1928–2011), Soviet-Russian singer and actress
- Tatjana Šimić (born 1963), Croatian-Dutch actress and singer
- Tatiana Stefanidou (born 1970), Greek television host
- Tatiana Mikhailovna Troepolskaya (c. 1744–1774), Russian actress and opera singer
- Tatjana Turanskyj (1966–2021), German director, film producer, screenwriter and actor
- Tatyana Vasilyeva (born 1947), Russian actress
- Tatyana Vedeneyeva (born 1953), Soviet and Russian actress
- Tatiana Vilhelmová (born 1976), Czech actress
- Tatyana Yegorova (1944–2025), Russian actress

=== In music ===
- Tatiana Abramova (born 1975), Russian singer and actress
- Tatiana Aleshina (born 1961), Russian composer, singer-songwriter, theater artist, and poet
- Tatiana Andrianova (born 1972), Russian concert organist
- Tatiana Baranova Monighetti, Russian-Swiss musicologist
- Tatiana Bershadskaya (1921–2021), Russian musicologist
- Tatiana Borodina, Russian opera soprano
- Tatiana Bulanova (born 1969), Russian pop singer
- Tatiana Cameron (born 1970), Croatian-born pop singer (formerly known as "Tajci")
- Tatyana Chudova (1944–2021), Russian composer
- Tatiana DeMaria, English musician
- Tatiana Eva-Marie, Swiss singer
- Princess Tatiana von Fürstenberg (born 1971), daughter of Prince Egon and Diane Von Fürstenberg; singer in the band Playdate
- Tatiana Grindenko (born 1946), Russian violinist
- Tatjana Gürbaca (born 1973), German opera director
- Tatjana Hitrina, Russian singer (born circa 1920s) who settled in Australia
- Tatiana Kotova (born 1985), Russian singer, actress, and television presenter
- Tatjana Kozlova-Johannes (born 1977), Estonian-Russian composer
- Tatiana Kurtukova (born 1993), Russian singer-songwriter, actress, and educator
- Tatiana Mais, also known as Q-Tee, British songwriter and rapper
- Tatjana Masurenko (born 1965), German violist
- Tatiana Menotti (1909–2001), Italian operatic soprano
- Tatyana Mezhentseva (born 2009), Russian singer
- Tatiana Naynik (born 1978), Russian singer, actress, model, and producer
- Tatiana Nikolayeva (1924–1993), Soviet and Russian pianist, composer, and teacher.
- Tatiana Okupnik (born 1978), Polish singer, based in London
- Tatiana Palacios Chapa (born 1968), American-born Mexican singer, actress and television presenter
- Tatjana Radisic, Serbian costume designer
- Tatjana Romanova-Vorontsova (born 1973), Russian opera singer
- Tatiana Shmailyuk (born 1987), Ukrainian singer, frontwoman of the metal band Jinjer
- Tatyana Sergeyeva (born 1951), Russian composer
- Tatiana Shebanova (1953–2011), Russian pianist
- Tatyana Shlykova, Russian opera singer
- Tatyana Snezhina (1972–1995), Russian poet and singer-songwriter
- Tatiana Sorokina (born 1970), Russian singer
- Tatiana Stepa (1963–2009), Romanian folk singer
- Tatiana Troyanos (1938–1993), American opera singer
- Tatjana Vassiljeva (born 1977), Russian cellist
- Tatyana Voronina (born 1959), Russian composer

=== In visual and performing arts ===
- Tatianna (born 1987), American drag queen
- Tatiana Badanina (born 1955), Russian visual artist
- Tatiana Baganova (born 1968), Russian choreographer
- Tatiana Baillayre (1916–1991), Romanian painter
- Tatjana Barbakoff (1899–1944), Russian dancer
- Tatiana Belokonenko, Ukrainian artist
- Tatiana Bezjak (born 1971), Croatian sculptor and writer
- Tatiana Bilbao (born 1972), Mexican architect
- Tatiana Blass (born 1979), Brazilian multidisciplinary artist
- Tatiana Dokoudovska (1921–2005), French ballet dancer
- Tatjana Doll (born 1970), German painter
- Tatiana Echeverri Fernandez (born 1974), Colombian multidisciplinary artist
- Tatiana Fabeck (born 1970), Luxembourgish architect
- Tatjana Gamerith (1919–2021), German-Austrian painter and graphic artist
- Tatiana Godovalnikova (born 1962), Russian contemporary artist
- Tatiana Gorb (1935–2013), Soviet Russian painter, graphic artist, art teacher and illustrator
- Tatyana Grosman (1904–1982), Russian-American printmaker and publisher
- Tatjana Gsovsky (1901–1993), ballet dancer and choreographer
- Tatiana Kapustina (born 1950), Russian ballet master, pedagogue, and ballet soloist
- Tatiana Kopnina (1921–2009) Soviet and Russian painter and art teacher
- Tatiana Leskova (born 1922), French-born Brazilian ballerina and choreographer
- Tatiana Mamaki (1921–2007), Greek dancer and choreographer
- Tatyana Mavrina (1902–1996) Soviet artist and children's book illustrator
- Tatiana Mollmann (born 1983), American professional dancer
- Tatiana Muñoz Brenes, Costa Rican curator
- Tatyana Nazarenko (born 1944), Russian painter
- Tatyana Palchuk (born 1954), Latvian artist
- Tatiana von Preussen (born 1980), American architect
- Tatiana Riabouchinska (1917–2000), Russian American prima ballerina and teacher
- Tatyana Sherstyuk (born 1981), Russian artist and art curator
- Tatiana Stepanova, Ukrainian ballerina and choreographer
- Tatiana Sukhotina-Tolstaya (1864–1950), Russian painter and memoirist
- Tatiana Tchernavin (1887–1971), Russian-born artist
- Tatiana Trouvé (born 1968), French-Italian visual artist

=== In sports ===
- Tatyana Adamovich (born 1942), American fencer
- Tatiana Aholou (born 2000), Canadian hurdler
- Tatyana Akhmetova-Amanzhol (born 1985), Kazakhstani freestyle wrestler
- Tatiana Akimova (born 1990), Russian biathlete
- Tatiana Al-Najar (born 1967), Jordanian table tennis player
- Tatiana Aleeva (born 1991), Russian weightlifter
- Tatyana Alekseyeva (born 1963), Russian 400-metre runner
- Tatiana Alizar (born 1978), Russian handball player
- Tatiana Alves dos Santos (born 1978), Brazilian volleyball player
- Tatyana Ananko (born 1984), Belarusian rhythmic gymnast
- Tatiana Andreeva (born 1970), Soviet figure skater
- Tatiana Andreoli (born 1999), Italian archer
- Tatyana Andrianova (born 1979), Russian middle-distance runner
- Tatyana Andryushina (born 1990), Russian épée fencer
- Tatyana Anisimova (born 1949), Soviet hurdler
- Tatiana Antoshina (born 1982), Russian road bicycle racer
- Tatiana Ariza (born 1991), Colombian footballer
- Tatyana Petrova Arkhipova (born 1983), Russian long-distance runner
- Tatiana Artmenko (born 1976), Israeli volleyball player
- Tatyana Aryasova (born 1978), Russian long-distance runner
- Tatyana Averina (1950–2001), Soviet speed skater
- Tatyana Azarova (born 1985), Kazakhstani hurdler
- Tatyana Babashkina (born 1968), Russian high jumper
- Tatjana Baļičeva (born 1998), Latvian footballer
- Tatiana Baranovskaya (born 1987), Russian acrobatic gymnast
- Tatiana Barsuk (born 1985), Russian sport shooter
- Tatiana Basova (born 1984), Russian figure skater
- Tatiana Bazyuk (born 1984), Russian windsurfer
- Tatyana Belan (born 1982), Belarusian rhythmic gymnast
- Tatiana Belonogoff (born 2001), Russian swimmer
- Tatiana Berlin (born 1977), Belarusian chess player
- Tatjana Bibik (born 1985), Russian badminton player
- Tatyana Biryulina (born 1955), Soviet javelin thrower
- Tatiana Blattnerová (born 2002), Slovak Paralympic swimmer
- Tatyana Blokhina (born 1970), Russian former track and field athlete
- Tatyana Bocharova (born 1983), Kazakhstani athletics competitor
- Tatiana Bodóvá (born 1991), Slovak speed skater
- Tatyana Bogomyagkova (born 1972), Russian judoka
- Tatiana Bonetti (born 1991), Italian footballer
- Tatyana Borisova (born 1976), Kyrgyzstani middle distance runner
- Tatiana Borodulina (born 1984), Australian speed skater
- Tatjana Brnović (born 1998), Montenegrin handball player
- Tatiana Búa (born 1990), Argentine tennis player
- Tatiana Burina (born 1980), Russian ice hockey player
- Tatjana Burmazovic (born 1984), Serbian volleyball player
- Tatiana Calderón (born 1993), Colombian racing driver
- Tatyana Chebykina (born 1968), Russian sprinter
- Tatyana Chernova (born 1988), Russian heptathlete
- Tatiana Cheverda (born 1974), Russian footballer
- Tatiana Chișca (born 1995), Moldovan swimmer
- Tatiana Chuvaeva (born 1983), Ukrainian pair skater
- Tatiana Cocsanova (born 2004), Canadian rhythmic gymnast
- Tatiana Danilova (born 1993), Russian pair skater
- Tatyana Danshina (born 1975), Russian speed skater
- Tatyana Davydova (born 2000), Kazakhstani handball player
- Tatiana Debien (born 1991), French freestyle skier
- Tatjana Đekanović (born 1997), Bosnian sports shooter
- Tatyana Dektyareva (born 1981), Russian former track and field athlete
- Tatyana Devyatova (born 1948), Ukrainian swimmer
- Tatyana Dolmatova (born 1992), Armenian footballer
- Tatiana Dornbusch (born 1982), Ukraine-French chess player
- Tatiana Dorofeeva (born 1965), Russian dressage rider
- Tatyana Dronina (born 1978), Russian handball player
- Tatiana Drozdovskaya (born 1978), Belarusian sailor
- Tatiana Druchinina (born 1969), Soviet rhythmic gymnast
- Tatiana Dueñas (born 1998), Colombian cyclist
- Tatiana Durasova, Soviet ice dancer
- Tatyana Dzhandzhgava (born 1964), Kazakhstani handball player
- Tatyana Dzheneyeva (born 1944), Soviet diver
- Tatyana Efimenko (born 1981), Kyrgyzstani high jumper
- Tatiana Egorova (1970–2012), Russian footballer and manager
- Tatiana Erokhina (born 1984), Russian handball goalkeeper
- Tatiana Ewodo (born 1997), Cameroonian footballer
- Tatyana Federova (born 1978), Azerbaijani volleyball player
- Tatyana Fendrikova (born 1990), Kazakhstani volleyball player
- Tatiana Ferdman (born 1957), Soviet table tennis player
- Tatiana Figueiredo (born 1968), Brazilian gymnast
- Tatyana Firova (born 1982), Russian sprint athlete
- Tatiana Flores (born 2005), Mexican footballer
- Tatyana Fomina (born 1954), Estonian chess player
- Tatyana Forbes (born 1997), American softball player
- Tatjana Frage (born 1973), Israeli volleyball player
- Tatiana Frolova (born 1966), Russian artistic gymnast
- Tatiana Frunză (born 1987), Moldovan footballer
- Tathiana Garbin (born 1977), Italian tennis player
- Tatiana Garmendia (born 1974), Spanish handball player
- Tatyana Geneleva (born 1997), Kazakhstani cyclist
- Tatiana Georgiou (born 1996), Greek footballer
- Tatiana Gladkova, Soviet ice dancer
- Tatiana Goldobina (born 1975), Russian sport shooter
- Tatiana Golovin (born 1988), French tennis player of Russian origin
- Tatyana Gomolko, Russian rower
- Tatyana Gonobobleva (1948–2007), Soviet volleyball player
- Tatiana Gorbunova (born 1990), Russian rhythmic gymnast
- Tatyana Gorbunova (born 1995), Russian cross-country skier
- Tatiana Gorchkova (born 1981), Russian volleyball player
- Tatyana Gordeyeva (born 1973), Russian heptathlete
- Tatyana Goyshchik (born 1952), Soviet sprinter
- Tatiana Grabuzova (born 1967), Russian chess player
- Tatyana Grachova (born 1973), Russian volleyball player
- Tatyana Grigorenko (born 1984), Belarusian gymnast
- Tatiana Grigorieva (born 1975), Australian athlete of Russian origin
- Tatiana Groshkova (born 1973), Soviet artistic gymnast
- Tatyana Gubina (born 1977), Kazakhstani water polo player
- Tatiana Guderzo (born 1984), Italian cyclist
- Tatyana Gudkova (born 1978), Russian racewalker
- Tatyana Gudkova (fencer) (born 1993), Russian fencer
- Tatiana Gusin (born 1994), Greek high jumper
- Tatiana Gutsu (born 1976), Ukrainian Olympic Gymnast
- Tatiana Guzmán (born 1987), Nicaraguan football referee and former player
- Tatjana Haenni (born 1966), Swiss association football player
- Tatyana Heard (born 1995), Italian-born English rugby union player
- Tatjana Hüfner (born 1983), German luger
- Tatiana Hurtado, Colombian freestyle wrestler
- Tatiana Ignatieva (born 1974), Belarusian tennis player
- Tatiana Ilyina (born 1965), Ukrainian volleyball player
- Tatiana Ilyuchenko (born 1973), Russian biathlete and cross-country skier
- Tatiana Ivanova (born 1991), Russian luger
- Tatyana Ivinskaya (born 1958), Soviet Belarusian basketball player
- Tatiana Jaseková (born 1988), Slovak cyclist
- Tatjana Ječmenica (table tennis) (born 1949), Slovenian table tennis player
- Tatjana Ječmenica (1978–2026), Serbian tennis player and coach
- Tatjana Jelača (born 1990), Serbian javelin thrower
- Tatiana Kadochkina (born 2003), Russian volleyball player
- Tatyana Kalmykova (born 1990), Russian racewalker
- Tatyana Kapustina (born 1998), Kazakhstani weightlifter
- Tatyana Karakashyants (1925–2004), Soviet diver
- Tatiana Kashirina (born 1991), Russian weightlifter
- Tatiana Kavvadia (born 1976), Greek basketball player
- Tatyana Kazankina (born 1951), Russian runner
- Tatyana Khlyzova (born 1981), Kazakhstani ice hockey player
- Tatyana Khmyrova (born 1990), Russian handball player
- Tatyana Khramova (born 1970), Belarusian high jumper
- Tatyana Khromova (born 1980), Kazakhstani weightlifter
- Tatiana Kiseleva (born 1996), Russian female track cyclist
- Tatjana Kivimägi (born 1984), Russian-Estonian high jumper
- Taťána Kocembová (born 1952), Czechoslovak runner
- Tatiana Kokoreva (born 1988), Russian pair skater
- Tatiana Kolesnikova (born 1993), Russian amateur wrestler
- Tatyana Kolpakova (born 1959), Russian long jumper
- Tatiana Kononenko (born 1978), Ukrainian chess player
- Tatyana Konstantinova (born 1970), Russian hammer thrower
- Tatiana Korshunova (born 1956), Soviet canoeist
- Tatiana Kosheleva (born 1988), Russian Volleyball Player
- Tatyana Koshevnikova (born 1980), Kazakhstani weightlifter
- Tatiana Kosintseva (born 1986), Russian international chess Grandmaster
- Tatyana Kosterina (born 1977), Russian equestrian
- Tatyana Kostromina (born 1973), Belarusian table tennis player
- Tatyana Kotova (born 1976), Russian long jumper
- Tatiana Kovalchuk (born 1979), Ukrainian tennis player
- Tatiana Kozlova (born 1986), Russian orienteer
- Tatyana Kozlova (born 1983), Russian racewalker
- Tatyana Krasnova (born 1995), Belarusian footballer
- Tatiana Kravtchenko (1940–2016), Soviet rhythmic gymnast
- Tatyana Kraynova (born 1967), Soviet volleyball player
- Tatiana Kurbakova (born 1986), Russian rhythmic gymnast
- Tatyana Kurnikova (born 1965), Soviet swimmer
- Tatyana Kurochkina (born 1967), Belarusian athlete
- Tatiana Kutlíková (born 1972), Slovak skier
- Tatiana Kuzmina (born 1990), Russian taekwondo athlete
- Tatiana Kyriushyna (born 1989), Ukrainian handball player
- Tatyana Lartseva (born 1982), Russian sailor
- Tatyana Lebedeva (born 1976), Russian triple jumper and long jumper
- Tatyana Lebrun (born 2004), Belgian Paralympic swimmer
- Tatyana Ledovskaya (born 1966), Soviet and Belarusian athletics competitor
- Tatjana Lematschko (1948–2020), Swiss chess player
- Tatiana Lemos, Brazilian freestyle swimmer
- Tatyana Lesovaya (born 1956), Russian discus thrower
- Tatiana Levina (born 1965), Uzbekistani canoeist
- Tatyana Levina (born 1977), Russian sprinter
- Tatyana Litovchenko (born 1978), Russian swimmer
- Tatyana Logatskaya (born 1977), Belarusian table tennis player
- Tatiana Logunova (born 1980), Russian épée fencer
- Tatjana Lojanica (born 1981), Serbian sprinter
- Jessica Long American Paralympic gold medalist born Tatiana Olegovna Kirillova (born 1992)
- Tatiana Lysenko (born 1975), Ukrainian gymnast
- Tatyana Lysenko (born 1983), Russian hammer thrower
- Tatjana Majcen Ljubič (born 1978), Slovenian Paralympic athlete
- Tatjana Malek (born 1987), German tennis player
- Tatiana Malinina (born 1973), Russian-Uzbek retired figure skater
- Tatjana Mannima (born 1980), Estonian cross-country skier
- Tatjana Maria (born 1987), German tennis player
- Tatiana Markushevskaya (born 1994), Belarusian footballer
- Tatyana Markvo (born 1941), Russian rower
- Tatyana Mashkova (born 1988), Kazakhstani beach volleyball player
- Tatyana McFadden (born 1989), American Paralympic athlete
- Tatjana Medved (born 1974), Serbian handball player
- Tatiana Melamed (born 1974), German chess player
- Tatyana Menshova (born 1970), Russian volleyball player
- Tatiana Mezinova, Russian Paralympic athlete
- Tatiana Miloserdova (born 1960), Russian equestrian
- Tatyana Mineyeva (born 1990), Russian racewalker
- Tatiana Minina (born 1997), Russian taekwondo practitioner
- Tatiana Mishina (born 1954), Russian figure skater and coach
- Tatjana Mittermayer (born 1964), German freestyle skier
- Tatiana Moiseeva (born 1981), Russian biathlete
- Tatiana Moskvina (born 1973), Belarusian Olympic judoka
- Tatiana Mountbatten (born 1990), English equestrian
- Tatiana Mouratova (born 1979), Russian modern pentathlete
- Tatyana Mudritskaya (born 1985), Kazakhstani volleyball player
- Tatiana Nabieva (born 1994), Russian artistic gymnast
- Tatiana Navka (born 1975), Russian ice dancer
- Tatyana Nemtsova (born 1946), Soviet figure skater
- Tatyana Neroznak (born 1992), Kazakhstani runner
- Tatiana Novik (born 1994), Russian pair skater
- Tatiana Ogrizko (born 1976), Belarusian rhythmic gymnast
- Tatiana Ortiz (born 1984), Mexican diver
- Tatyana Osipova (born 1987), Kazakhstani cross-country skier
- Tatyana Ovechkina (born 1950), Russian basketball player
- Tatjana Paller (born 1995), German cyclist
- Tatiana Panova (born 1976), Russian tennis player
- Tatyana Parfenova (born 1985), Kazakhstani handball player
- Tatjana Pašalić (born 1994), Croatian poker presenter
- Tatiana Perebiynis (born 1982), Ukrainian tennis player
- Tatyana Petrenko-Samusenko (1938–2000), Soviet fencer
- Tatiana Petrova (born 1973), Russian water polo player
- Tatsiana Piatrenia (born 1981), Belarusian trampoline gymnast
- Tatiana Pieri (born 1999), Italian tennis player
- Tatjana Pinto (born 1992), German sprinter
- Tatiana Pinto (born 1994), Portuguese footballer
- Tatyana Podmaryova (born 1958), Soviet diver
- Tatyana Polnova (born 1979), Russian pole vaulter
- Tatyana Polovinskaya (born 1965), Ukrainian long-distance runner
- Tatyana Ponyayeva-Tretyakova (born 1946), Soviet volleyball player
- Tatiana Poutchek (born 1979), Belarusian tennis player
- Tatyana Pozdnyakova (born 1955), Soviet-born Ukrainian athlete
- Tatjana Priachin (born 1987), German tennis player
- Tatyana Prorochenko (1952–2020), Ukrainian athlete
- Tatyana Providokhina (born 1953), Soviet middle-distance runner
- Tatiana Prozorova (born 2003), Russian tennis player
- Tatyana Pyurova (born 1983), Kazakhstani volleyball player
- Tatiana Rachkova (born 1973), Russian figure skater
- Tatiana Rafter (born 1992), Canadian ice hockey player
- Tatyana Ragozina (born 1964), Ukrainian racewalker
- Tatiana Ratcu (born 1979), Brazilian chess player
- Tatiana Rentería (born 2000), Colombian freestyle wrestler
- Tatiana Repeikina (1973–2017), Russian footballer
- Tatyana Reshetnikova (born 1966), Russian former hurdler
- Tatiana Rizzo (born 1986), Argentine volleyball player
- Tatyana Roshchina (born 1941), Soviet volleyball player
- Tatyana Roslanova (born 1980), Kazakhstani runner
- Tatiana Rouba (born 1983), Spanish swimmer
- Tatyana Russiyan-Gubanova (1930–2012), Soviet helicopter sports athlete
- Tatiana Ryabkina (born 1980), Russian orienteering competitor
- Tatyana Sadovskaya (born 1966), Soviet fencer
- Tatiana Salcuțan (born 2001), Moldovan swimmer
- Tatyana Sarycheva (born 1949), Soviet volleyball player
- Tatiana Saunders (born 1993), English football goalkeeper
- Tatiana Savostyanova (born 1972), Russian Paralympic judoka
- Tatjana Schoenmaker (born 1997), South African swimmer
- Tatiana Segina (born 1992), Russian archer
- Tatiana Sergeeva (born 1992), Russian rhythmic gymnast
- Tatyana Sevryukova (1917–1981), Soviet shot putter
- Tatiana Shadrina (born 1974), Russian chess player
- Tatiana Shamanova (born 1992), Russian cyclist
- Tatiana Sharanova (born 1946), Russian pair skater
- Tatyana Shatalova (born 1999), Russian ice hockey player
- Tatiana Shchegoleva (born 1982), Russian basketball player
- Tatyana Shchelkanova (1937–2011), Soviet track and field athlete
- Tatyana Shcherbak (born 1997), Russian footballer
- Tatyana Shelekhova (born 1946), Ukrainian speed skater
- Tatyana Shemyakina (born 1987), Russian racewalker
- Tatiana Sheykina (born 1991), Russian footballer
- Tatyana Shibanova (born 1994), Russian ice hockey player
- Tatyana Shishkina (born 1969), Russian-born Kazakhstani Olympic judoka
- Tatiana Shishkova, Moldovan cyclist
- Tatyana Shramok (born 1982), Belarusian footballer
- Tatiana Shumiakina (born 1965), Russian chess player
- Tatyana Shvyganova (born 1960), Olympic field hockey player
- Tatyana Sibileva (born 1980), Russian racewalker
- Tatyana Sidorenko (born 1966), Soviet, Russian and Croatian volleyball player
- Tatyana Sidorova (born 1936), Russian speed skater
- Tatyana Skachko (born 1954), Russian long jumper
- Tatyana Skotnikova (born 1978), Russian footballer
- Tatiana Smirnova (born 1964), Russian curler
- Tatjana Smith (born 1997), South African swimmer
- Tatjana Smolnikar (born 1962), Slovenian skier
- Tatiana Solanet (born 1992), French footballer
- Tatiana Sorina (born 1994) Russian cross-country skier
- Tatiana Sotnikova (born 1981), Russian ice hockey forward
- Tatiana Sousa (born 1975), Greek handball player
- Tatiana Stepovaya (born 1965), Russian chess player
- Tatyana Stetsenko (born 1957), Soviet rower
- Tatyana Storozheva (born 1954), Soviet athlete
- Tatiana Suarez (born 1990), American mixed martial artist and wrestler
- Tatyana Sudarikova (born 1973), Kyrgyzstani javelin thrower
- Tatyana Sychova (born 1957), Georgian long-distance runner
- Tatyana Talysheva (born 1937), Soviet long jumper
- Tatiana Tarasova (born 1947), Russian figure skating coach and adviser
- Tatyana Ter-Mesrobyan (born 1968), Russian long jumper of Armenian descent
- Tatyana Tishchenko (born 1975), Russian canoeist
- Tatyana Tolmachova (1907–1998), Soviet figure skater
- Tatyana Tomashova (born 1975), Russian middle-distance runner
- Tatiana Tongova (born 1989), Bulgarian rhythmic gymnast
- Tatiana Totmianina (born 1981), Russian pair skater
- Tatyana Trapeznikova (born 1973), Russian speed skater
- Tatyana Troina (born 1981), Belarusian basketball player
- Tatyana Tsaryova (born 1977), Russian ice hockey player
- Tatiana Tudvaseva (born 1997), Russian pair skater
- Tatiana Ullua (born 1992), Argentine weightlifter
- Tatjana Vasilevich (born 1977), Ukrainian chess player
- Tatjana Vasiljeva, Latvian snooker player
- Tatiana Vattier (born 1977), French badminton player
- Tatyana Veinberga (1943–2008), Latvian volleyball player
- Tatyana Veshkurova, (born 1981), Russian sprint athlete
- Tatiana Vidmer (born 1986), Russian basketball player
- Tatiana Vlasova (born 1977), Russian ski-orienteer
- Tatiana Voitiuk (born 1953), Soviet ice dancer
- Tatiana Volosozhar (born 1986), Ukrainian-born Russian pair skater
- Tatyana Volozhanina (born 2003), Bulgarian rhythmic gymnast
- Tatjana Vorobjova (born 1996), Estonian tennis player
- Tatyana Vorokhobko (born 1950), Soviet pentathlete
- Tatiana Voronova (born 1955), Latvian chess player
- Tatiana Weston-Webb (born 1976), Brazilian–American surfer
- Tatiana Woollaston (born 1986), snooker referee
- Tatyana Yembakhtova (born 1956), Olympic field hockey player
- Tatyana Yurchenko (born 1993), Kazakhstani middle-distance runner
- Tatiana Zaitseva (born 1978), Russian footballer
- Tatyana Zakharova (born 1969), Russian sprinter
- Tatiana Zatulovskaya (1935–2017), Russian-Israeli chess player
- Tatyana Zelentsova (born 1948), Soviet Russian hurdler
- Tatyana Zharganova (born 1980), Belarusian gymnast
- Tatyana Zhistova, Soviet canoeist
- Tatyana Zhuk (1946–2011), Soviet figure skater
- Tatiana Zhuravleva (born 1989), Russian discus thrower
- Tatyana Zhuravlyova (born 1967), Russian heptathlete
- Tatyana Zhyrkova (born 1968), Russian ultramarathon runner and athletics competitor
- Tatyana Zolotnitskaya (born 1955), Russian freestyle swimmer
- Tatiana Zorri (born 1977), Italian footballer
- Tatyana Zrazhevskaya (born 1992), Russian boxer

=== In literature and other fiction ===
- Tatiana de la tierra (1961–2012), Colombian writer, poet and activist
- Tatiana Arfel (born 1979), French writer
- Tatyana Bek (1949–2005), Russian poet, literary critic and literary scholar
- Tatiana Belinky (1919–2013), Russian-Brazilian children’s writer
- Tatiana Botkina (1898–1986), French writer
- Tatiana Dorofeeva (1948–2012), Russian linguist
- Tatyana Elizarenkova (1929–2007), Russian linguist
- Tatiana Fabergé (1930–2020), Swiss author
- Tatyana Felgenhauer (born 1985), Russian journalist
- Tatiana Garmash-Roffe (born 1959), Russian detective novelist
- Tatyana Gevorkyan (born 1974), Russian journalist
- Tatiana Gnedich (1907–1976), Russian translator
- Tatiana Gritsi-Milliex (1920–2005), Greek writer and journalist
- Tatyana Komarova (1952–2010), Russian journalist
- Tatyana Koshkaryova (born 1962), Russian journalist
- Tatiana Kudriavtseva (1920–2013), Russian editor and translator
- Tatiana Lobo (1939–2023), Chilean-born Costa Rican writer
- Tatyana Lysova (born 1968), Russian journalist
- Tatyana Mitkova (born 1955), Russian television journalist
- Tatyana Mokshanova (born 1984), Russian poet
- Tatyana Moskvina (1958–2022), Russian journalist
- Tatiana Mukakibibi, Rwandan journalist
- Tatiana Nicolescu (born 1923), Romanian literary historian
- Tatiana Niculescu Bran, Romanian writer and editor
- Tatiana Nikitina, linguist
- Tatiana de Rosnay (born 1961), author of the fiction Sarah's Key
- Tatiana Salem Levy (born 1979), Brazilian writer and translator
- Tatiana Schlossberg (1990–2025), American journalist and author, daughter of Caroline Kennedy Schlossberg and Edwin Schlossberg; granddaughter of John F. Kennedy and Jacqueline Kennedy Onassis
- Tatiana Shchepkina-Kupernik (1874–1952), Russian and Soviet writer, dramatist, poet and translator
- Tatjana Soli (born 1963), American novelist and short-story writer
- Tatiana Țîbuleac (born 1978), Moldovan-Romanian writer
- Tatyana Tolstaya (born 1951), modern Russian writer, granddaughter of Aleksei Tolstoy
- Tatiana Tsymbal (born 1946), Ukrainian journalist and news presenter
- Tatiana Vedenska (born 1976), Russian writer and novelist
- Tatiana Vishnevskaya (born 1985), Russian international producer
- Tatjana Wood (1926–2026), German-born American comic artist
- Tatyana Yesenina (1918–1992), Soviet writer

=== In science, technology, engineering and mathematics (STEM) ===
- Tatyana van Aardenne-Ehrenfest (1905–1984), Dutch mathematician
- Tatiana Afanaseva-Ehrenfest (1876–1964), Russian-born Dutch mathematician
- Tetiana Andriienko (1938–2016), Ukrainian botanist, conservationist, and academic
- Tatiana Anodina (born 1939), Russian aviation engineer
- Tatiana Ardamatskaya (1927–2011), Soviet-Ukrainian ornithologist
- Tatjana Berga (1944–2020), Latvian archaeologist and numismatist
- Tatiana Birshtein (1928–2022), Russian molecular scientist
- Tatjana Bregant (1932–2002), Slovene archaeologist
- Tatiana Budtova (born 1963), Soviet and Russian chemical researcher
- Tatyana Chernigovskaya (born 1947), Soviet and Russian scientist in neuroscience, psycholinguistics and theory of mind
- Tatiana Chvileva (1925–2000), Soviet mineralogist
- Tatiana Dettlaff (1912–2006), Russian developmental biologist specialising in oocyte growth and maturation in sturgeons
- Tatyana Dmitrieva (1951–2010), Russian psychiatrist
- Tatiana Dobrolyubova (1891–1972), Russian geologist and paleontologist
- Tatiana Vladimirovna Egorova (1930–2007), Russian botanist
- Tatiana Erukhimova, Russian-born American physicist
- Tatiana Foroud, American genetic researcher and academic
- Tatyana Frunze (1920–2024), Russian chemist
- Tatyana Karimova (born 1948), Tajik-Russian economist
- Tatiana Korcová (1937–1997), Slovak physicist
- Tatiana Krasnoselskaia (1884–1950), Russian botanist specializing in plant physiology
- Tatyana Krivobokova, Kazakhstani statistician
- Tatyana Kuznetsova (1941–2018), Soviet cosmonaut
- Tatiana von Landesberger (born 1979), Slovak-German computer scientist
- Tatiana Morosuk, Ukrainian mechanical engineer
- Tatiana Vladislavovna Petrova, Russian judicial scientist
- Tatjana Piotrowski, German molecular geneticist
- Tatiana Proskouriakoff (1909–1985), American Mayanist scholar
- Tatiana Prowell, American medical oncologist specializing in breast cancer
- Tatyana G. Rautian, Russian seismologist
- Tatiana Roque (born 1970), British mathematician, academic, and politician
- Tatiana Rosenthal, Russian neurologist and psychoanalyst
- Tatjana Rundek, American neurologist and epidemiologist
- Tatiana Rynearson, American oceanographer and academic
- Tatyana Sapunova, Russian biophysicist
- Tatiana Segura, American biomedical engineer and academic
- Tatiana Șevciuc (born 1983), Moldovan economist
- Tatyana Shaposhnikova (born 1946), Russian-born Swedish mathematician
- Tatyana Sharpee, American computational neuroscientist
- Tatyana Shaumyan (born 1938), Russian scholar
- Tatiana Shubin, Soviet and American mathematician
- Tatiana Stanovaya, Russian political scientist
- Tatiana Štefanovičová (1934–2021), Slovak archaeologist and historian
- Tatjana Stykel (born 1973), Russian mathematician
- Tatjana Tchumatchenko (born 1980), German physicist
- Tatjana Tönsmeyer, German historian
- Tatiana Toro (born 1964), Colombian-American mathematician
- Tatiana Urrutia (born 1982), Chilean scholar
- Tatjana Višak (born 1974), German philosopher
- Tatiana Warsher (1880–1960), Russian archaeologist
- Tatiana Wedenison (1864 – ?), first woman in Italy to attempt earning an engineering degree
- Tatiana B. Yanovskaya (1932–2019), Russian geophysicist and educator
- Tatyana Zaslavskaya (1927–2013), Russian sociologist and economist

=== Others ===
- Tatyana Andropova (1917–1991), spouse of Yuri Andropov
- Tatjana Aparac-Jelušić (born 1948), Croatian librarian
- Tatyana Apraksina, Russian artist, writer and poet
- Tatyana Astrakhankina (born 1960), Russian politician
- Tatiana Auguste (born 2001), Canadian politician
- Tatyana Bakhteeva (born 1953), Ukrainian politician
- Tatyana Bakiyeva, First Lady of Kyrgyzstan (2005–2010)
- Tatyana Baramzina (1919–1944), Soviet female sniper
- Tatjana Bobnar (born 1969), Slovenian police officer and politician
- Tatjana Böhm (born 1954), German politician
- Tatiana Butskaya (born 1970), Russian politician
- Tatiana Clouthier (born 1964), Mexican politician and educator
- Tatiana Cordero Velázquez (1961–2021), Ecuadorian feminist
- Tatiana Davydova (1861–1887), niece of Russian composer Pyotr Ilyich Tchaikovsky
- Tatiana Dogaru, Craniopagus twin
- Tatyana Dyakonova (born 1970), Russian politician
- Tatyana Fazlalizadeh (born 1985), American artist, activist and freelance illustrator
- Tatjana Festerling (born 1964), German politician
- Tatyana Franck (born 1984), museum director
- Tatyana Gigel (born 1960), Russian politician
- Tatyana Golikova (born 1966), Russian politician and economist
- Tatiana Goricheva (1947–2025), Russian philosopher, theologian, dissident, and feminist
- Tatjana Greif (born 1966), Slovenian politician
- Tatiana Grigorieva, Russian Japanologist, essayist, translator, editor, and academic
- Tatiana Grigorovici (1877–1952), Austrian-Hungarian social democratic labour activist and economic theorist
- Tatiana Hambro (born 1989), British fashion writer and editor
- Tatiana Hogan (born 2006), Canadian craniopagus conjoined twin
- Tatjana Jaanson (born 1966), Estonian rower and politician
- Tatjana Jančaitytė (1911–1999), Soviet-Lithuanian politician
- Tatjana Jurić (born 1982), Croatian presenter and model
- Tatiana Karelina (born 1980), Russian entrepreneur
- Tatyana Kim (born 1975), Russian businesswoman
- Tatjana Koķe (born 1955), Latvian politician
- Tatyana Koryagina (1943–2022), Russian economist and politician
- Tatyana Kostyrina (1924–1943), Soviet military hero
- Tatiana Kusayko (born 1960), Russian politician
- Tatiana Larionova (born 1955), Russian politician
- Tatyana Lebedeva (1850–1887), Russian revolutionary
- Tatjana Ljubišić, Serbian politician
- Tatjana Ljujić-Mijatović (born 1941), Bosnian politician
- Tatiana Lobach (born 1974), Russian politician
- Tatjana Macura (born 1981), Serbian politician
- Tatyana Makarova (1920–1944), Soviet World War II flight commander
- Tatiana Mamonova (born 1943), Russian artist and writer
- Tatjana Manojlović (born 1966), Serbian politician and journalist
- Tatyana Mantatova (born 1975), Russian politician
- Tatyana Marinenko (1920–1942), Soviet Russian partisan
- Tatjana Marković Topalović (born 1969), Serbian academic and politician
- Tatiana Markus (1921–1943), Ukrainian member of the anti-Nazi underground in Kiev
- Tatjana Matić (born 1972), Serbian politician
- Tatiana Molcean (born 1982), Moldovan diplomat
- Tatyana Moskalkova (born 1955), Russian lawyer, teacher and politician
- Tatjana Muravjova (born 1949), Estonian politician
- Tatyana Nesterenko (born 1959), Russian politician
- Tatyana Nikitina (born 1945), Russian bard and politician
- Tatyana Nikolayeva (1919–2022), Russian politician
- Tatiana Nikonova (1978–2021), Russian feminist, journalist and sex educator
- Tatjana Olujić, Serbian violinist and university professor
- Tatjana Ostojić, Serbian fashion designer
- Tatjana Pašić (born 1964), Serbian politician
- Tatjana Patitz (1966–2023), German fashion model
- Tatiana Potîng (born 1971), Moldovan politician
- Tatjana Rebelle, American activist
- Tatiana Reed, English automotive-based social media influencer
- Tatiana Rojas Leiva (born 1972), Chilean social anthropologist and politician
- Tatiana Rosová (born 1961), Slovak sociologist and politician
- Tatiana Rusesabagina (born 1958), Rwandan humanitarian
- Tatiana Sakharova (1973–2025), Russian politician
- Tatiana Santo Domingo (born 1983), Colombian socialite, heiress and fashion designer
- Tatiana Shevtsova (born 1969), Russian deputy minister of defense
- Tatyana Shlyakhto (born 1955), Belarusian high jumper and judge
- Tatiana Solomakha (1892–1918), Russian revolutionary
- Tatyana Solomatina (born 1956), Russian politician
- Tatiana Subbotina (born 1954), Russian YouTuber
- Tatiana Turanskaya (born 1972), Transnistrian politician
- Tatyana Velikanova (1932–2002), Soviet dissident and human rights activist
- Tatiana Vivienne, feminist activist from the Central African Republic
- Tatiana Valovaya (born 1958), Russian journalist, economist, politician and diplomat
- Tati Westbrook (born 1982), American Internet personality, YouTuber, businesswoman and makeup artist
- Tatyana Yumasheva (born 1960), Russian politician
- Tatjana Michaylovna Zacharova (born 1931), Russian production worker, author and politician
- Tatyana Zakharenkova (born 1958), Russian politician
- Tatjana Ždanoka (born 1950), Latvian politician

== Disambiguation ==
- Tatiana Matveeva, multiple people
- Tatyana Rodionova, several people
- Tatiana Yusupova, several people

== Fictional characters ==
- Tatiana Larina, the love interest in Alexander Pushkin's celebrated novel-in-verse Eugene Onegin
- Tatiana Romanova, James Bond's love interest in the 1963 movie From Russia with Love
- Tatiana Taylor, in Auf Wiedersehen, Pet
- Tatiana Wisla, in the anime series Last Exile
- Tatiana, in the Kingdom TV series
- Tatiana, the main antagonist of the video game No Straight Roads
- Tatianna, in Fire Emblem Gaiden who also appears in the remake of the game, Fire Emblem Echoes: Shadows of Valentia
- Princess Tatiana, from an episode of The Lion King's Timon and Pumbaa (Once Upon a Timon)
- Queen Tatiana, supporting character of the cancelled Nickelodeon sitcom The Other Kingdom
- EVA, character in Metal Gear Solid 3: Snake Eater who uses the name Tatyana as one of her cover identities
- Scythe, real name Tatjana. Character in Stormwatch (comics). A Serbian superhero and a member of Stormwatch

== See also ==
- Tatian (disambiguation)
- Tatya (disambiguation)
