= Tatya =

Tatya is a term of respect or courteous reference used for a male person in general.

Tatya may also refer to:

- Tatya Tope, General of the Peshwa's army
- Tatyarao Pundlikrao Lahane, Indian eye surgeon
- Tatya Vinchu, fictional character in Zapatlela film series.
- Tatya Tope Nagar Sports Complex, stadium in Madhya Pradesh, India
- Nizhnyaya Tatya, village in Bashkortostan, Russia

== See also ==
- Tatiana
- Tatian (disambiguation)
