= Tuta =

Tuta may refer to:

== Geography ==
- Taman Ungku Tun Aminah, a suburb in Iskandar Puteri, Johor, Malaysia
- Tuta, Boyacá, a municipality in Boyacá Department, Colombia
- Tuta, a village in Târgu Trotuș Commune, Bacău County, Romania

== People ==
- Frederick Tuta (1269–1291), Margrave of Landsberg
- Mladen Naletilić Tuta (1946–2021), Bosnian Croat paramilitary leader
- Servando Gómez Martínez (born 1966), Mexican drug lord nicknamed La Tuta
- Tuta (footballer, born 1950), the nickname of Brazilian footballer, João Margarido Rodrigues Alves
- Tuta (footballer, born 1974), the nickname of Brazilian footballer, Moacir Bastos
- Tuta (footballer, born 1984), the nickname of Brazilian footballer, Adorcelino Wesley Gomes da Silva
- Tuta (footballer, born 1999), the nickname of Brazilian footballer, Lucas Silva Melo

== Other ==
- Tuta (moth), a moth (Lepidoptera, Gelechiidae) genus
- Tuta (email), formerly Tutanota, an email app and email service
- TUTA, the Australian Trade Union Training Authority
- TUTA Theatre, Chicago-based theatre company
- TuTa, a form of boilersuit designed by Thayaht

== See also ==
- Tutta, a feminine given name
