= Tetiana =

- Pronunciation: English: /təˈtjɑːnə/ tə-TYAH-nə; Ukrainian: [teˈtʲɑnɐ]
- Gender: Female

Origin
- Origin: Roman
- Meaning: Roman clan name Tatius

Other names
- Related names: Tatiana

Tetiana or Tetyana (Ukrainian: Тетя́на [teˈtʲɑnɐ]) is the Ukrainian variation on the female Slavic name Tatiana.

== Sportspeople ==
=== Athletics ===
- Tetyana Bonenko (born 1976), Ukrainian sprinter
- Tetyana Dorovskikh (born 1961), retired middle distance runner
- Tetyana Filonyuk (born 1984), Ukrainian long-distance runner
- Tetyana Hamera-Shmyrko (born 1983), Ukrainian long-distance runner
- Tetyana Hladyr (born 1975), Ukrainian long-distance runner
- Tetyana Holovchenko (born 1980), Ukrainian middle- and long-distance runner
- Tetyana Kryvobok (born 1972), Ukrainian middle distance runner
- Tetyana Lyakhovych (born 1979), Ukrainian javelin thrower
- Tetiana Petlyuk (born 1982), Ukrainian middle-distance runner
- Tetyana Skachko (born 1954), Soviet-Ukrainian long-jumper
- Tetyana Tereshchuk-Antipova (born 1969), Ukrainian 400 m hurdler
- Tetyana Tkalich (born 1975), Ukrainian sprinter
- Tetyana Yakybchuk (born 1968), Ukrainian Paralympic thrower

=== Other sports ===
- Tetyana Antypenko (born 1981), Ukrainian cross-country skier
- Tetyana Arefyeva, Ukrainian tennis player
- Tetyana Berezhna (born 1982), archer from Ukraine
- Tetyana Bilenko (born 1983), Ukrainian table tennis player
- Tetyana Chorna (born 1981), Ukrainian international footballer
- Tetyana Dorokhova (born 1985), Ukrainian archer
- Tetyana Hlushchenko (born 1956), former Soviet/Ukrainian handball player
- Tetyana Horb (born 1965), Ukrainian former handball player
- Tetyana Khala (born 1987), Ukrainian swimmer
- Tetyana Kocherhina (born 1956), former Soviet/Ukrainian handball player
- Tetiana Kolesnikova (born 1977), Ukrainian Olympic rower
- Tetyana Lazareva (born 1981), Ukrainian wrestler
- Tetiana Luzhanska (born 1984), Ukrainian-American tennis player
- Tetyana Romanenko (born 1990), Ukrainian international footballer
- Tetyana Semykina (born 1973), Ukrainian sprint canoeist
- Tetyana Shynkarenko (born 1978), Ukrainian team handball player
- Tetyana Sorochynska (born 1983), Ukrainian table tennis player
- Tetyana Tikun (born 1994), Ukrainian alpine skier
- Tetiana Ustiuzhanina (born 1965), Ukrainian Olympic rower
- Tetyana Vodopyanova (born 1973), former Ukrainian biathlete
- Tetiana Zakharova-Nadyrova (born 1951), Ukrainian basketball player

== Other people ==
- Tetiana Andriienko (1938–2016), Ukrainian botanist, professor
- Tetiana Balahura (born 1960), Ukrainian language teacher
- Tetyana Kardynalovska (1899–1993), Ukrainian interpreter and writer
- Tetiana Podchasova (born 1940), Ukrainian economist-cyberneticist, computer scientist
- Tetyana Vilkul (born 1969), Ukrainian historian
- Tetyana Yablonska (1917–2005), Ukrainian painter

== See also ==
- Tatian (disambiguation)
