= Tatiana Segura =

American biomedical engineer and academic

- Education: University of California, Berkeley; Northwestern University
- Scientific career
- Workplaces: Duke University Pratt School of Engineering; University of California, Los Angeles
- Thesis: Engineering substrate-mediated gene delivery : a novel DNA delivery strategy (2004)

Tatiana Segura is an American biomedical engineer who is a professor at Duke University. Her research considers biomedical engineering solutions to promote cell growth. She was elected Fellow of the American Institute for Medical and Biological Engineering in 2017 and awarded the Acta Biomaterialia Silver Medal in 2021.

== Early life and education ==
Segura earned her undergraduate degree at the University of California, Berkeley. She moved to Northwestern University for her doctoral research, where she used hydrogel scaffolds for non-viral gene delivery with Lonnie Shea. Segura moved to the École Polytechnique Fédérale de Lausanne working alongside Jeffrey Hubbell on polymer self-assembly.

== Research and career ==
Segura joined University of California, Los Angeles in 2007. She moved to the Duke University Pratt School of Engineering in 2018. Segura studies new materials for in situ tissue repair. Her research focuses on the development of hydrogels that can help the body repair damaged or diseased tissue. These gels can help the repair by forming a scaffold in the wound that acts like an extracellular matrix, encouraging tissue growth. By integrating an integrin-binding molecule, the blood vessels that form within this new tissue are stronger. These hydrogels can harness the body's innate immune response, promoting endogenous (and rapid) tissue repair. In particular, Segura considers the growth of new neurons and new blood vessels to enable healing in the brain and the skin. New neurons could limit the impact of conditions such as strokes, and in the skin, new blood vessels promote sebaceous gland growth, minimizing scarring.

Segura created coatings for orthopedic implants that contained antibiotics, which can eliminate infectious bacteria and transform surgical implants.

== Awards and honors ==
- American Society of Gene and Cell Therapy Outstanding Young Investigator Award
- American Heart Association National Scientist Development Grant
- National Science Foundation CAREER Award
- Elected to the College of Fellows at the American Institute for Medical and Biological Engineers
- Acta Biomaterialia Silver Medal Award in 2021
- National Academy of Inventers, Senior Member in 2023.

== Selected publications ==
- Donald R Griffin; Westbrook M Weaver; Philip O Scumpia; Dino Di Carlo; Segura, Tatiana (2015). "Accelerated wound healing by injectable microporous gel scaffolds assembled from annealed building blocks". Nature Materials. 14 (7): 737–744. doi:10.1038/nmat4294. PMC 4615579. PMID 26030305. Wikidata Q36191029.
- Segura, Tatiana; Brian C Anderson; Peter H Chung; Rebecca E Webber; Kenneth R Shull; Lonnie D Shea (2005). "Crosslinked hyaluronic acid hydrogels: a strategy to functionalize and pattern". Biomaterials. 26 (4): 359–371. doi:10.1016/j.biomaterials.2004.02.067. PMID 15275810. Wikidata Q34336022.
- Ming Yan; Juanjuan Du; Zhen Gu; et al. (2009). "A novel intracellular protein delivery platform based on single-protein nanocapsules". Nature Nanotechnology. 5 (1): 48–53. doi:10.1038/nnano.2009.341. PMID 19935648. Wikidata Q44697222.
- More recent articles include the following:
