= Tatiana Ardamatskaya =

Soviet-Ukrainian ornithologist

Tatiana Borisovna Ardamatskaya
- Татьяна Борисовна Ардамацкая
- Born: October 25, 1927; Leningrad
- Died: October 24, 2011 (aged 83); Hola Prystan
- Citizenship: USSR, Ukraine
- Education: Candidate of Biological Sciences (PhD), 1963; Odessa University; University of Leningrad; Academy of Sciences of the Ukrainian SSSR
- Spouse: Boris V. Sabinevsky
- Scientific career
- Fields: Ornithology
- Workplaces: Azov-Syvash Nature Park, Black Sea Biosphere Reserve, Azov Black Sea Ornithological Station
- Thesis: Экология гнездящихся утиных Северо-Западного Причерноморья (The Ecology of Nesting Anatinae of the Northwest Black Sea Region)
- Doctoral advisor: Mikhail Anatolyevich Voinstvensky
- Other academic advisors: Aleksey Malchevskiy

Tatiana Borisovna Ardamatskaya (Russian: Татьяна Борисовна Ардамацкая; 25 October 1927 – 24 October 2011) was a Soviet-Ukrainian ornithologist and conservationist. She is known for her research on waterbirds and coastal birds of the Ukrainian Black Sea region and for her efforts to improve environmental protections for them. Her studies included Mediterranean gulls, swans, eiders, ducks, geese, and terns, among others.

== Early life and career ==
Ardamatskaya was born in Leningrad to a lawyer father and a doctor mother, both graduates of the University of Leningrad. When her father, a hereditary nobleman, was exiled to the Volga steppes in the mid-1930s, Ardamatskaya was forced to leave Leningrad with her mother and two sisters and move to the rural settlement of Aleksandrovo, Leningrad region. Despite difficult circumstances, time spent surrounded by and observing nature—exploring the woods, riding horseback through the fields, and nursing owl, jackdaw, and magpies chicks—encouraged her to become a naturalist.

After graduating from high school, Ardamatskaya went south to Odessa to mitigate an aggravated medical condition with the Black Sea coastal climate. She spent one year enrolled in the biology program at Odessa University before an improvement in health allowed her to return to Leningrad and transfer to the University of Leningrad.

As an early student of the Soviet ornithologist Aleksey Malchevskiy at University of Leningrad, Ardamatskaya became part of a renaissance in Soviet ornithological study in the early 1950s. Ardamatskaya graduated from the Department of Vertebrate Zoology in 1952. Doctors again advised that she move to a climate more conducive to her health—either the mountains or the Black or Caspian Sea—so she accepted a research position at Azov-Syvash Nature Reserve in Soviet Ukraine. During this time, she met Boris V. Sabinevsky, a prominent ornithologist who later became her husband.

A year later in 1953, she left Azov-Syvash to take a research position at Black Sea Reserve, where she stayed for 35 years. Ardamatskaya lived in southern Ukraine on the coast of the Black Sea for the remainder of her life.

Ardamatskaya completed her doctorate at the Academy of Sciences of the Ukrainian Soviet Socialist Republic (now the National Academy of Sciences of Ukraine), successfully defending her dissertation on the nesting ducks in the northwest Black Sea region in 1963. She continued to study various species of ducks in the Black Sea region over the course of her career, developed recommendations for their protection, and advocated for the implementation of those protections.

== Later career and legacy ==
Beginning in the 1960s, Ardamatskaya helped orchestrate and carry out large-scale bird ringing projects to study the seasonal movements of Black Sea region water and coastal birds like the Mediterranean gull. For the first time in southern Ukraine, her banding projects clarified the dates and paths of seasonal migrations and the breeding, nesting, molting, and wintering areas for many water and coastal birds. Ardamatskaya became affectionately known as the "Mother of the Mediterranean Gull" for her in-depth study of the species and the protective measures she developed that improved nesting conditions and restored their numbers.

Thanks to her decades-long work at the Black Sea Reserve, the nesting bird population within the reserve markedly increased, and new areas of land important for environmental conservation were added to the reserve, including eastern part of the Gulf of Tendra. On her initiative, a number of new nature reserves were also created in other parts of the Kherson region.

Ardamatskaya was an integral part of the scholarly ornithological community in the Soviet Union and Europe during her time. She attended all 10 of the Soviet Union's ornithological conferences, and in the late 1970s helped found the Azov-Black Sea Ornithological Working Group in the 1970s, a scholarly forum that remains active today. Sometime in the 1990s to 2000s, she also served as a senior researcher at Azov-Black Sea Ornithological Station for several years.

Based upon her extensive fieldwork, Ardamatskaya not only published over 170 scientific papers but also fought for bird conservation throughout her life, providing youth education programming and advocating for a science-based approach to waterbird game season regulation. As part of her conservation efforts, Ardamatskaya helped found the Ukrainian Society for the Protection of Birds in 1994, was elected its first president, and remained its honorary president in the last years of her life. Due in large part to her research and charismatic advocacy, several of the bird species she worked with were entered in Ukraine's endangered species list, opening the way for greater protections and public awareness.

== Publications in English ==
- Ardamatskaya, T. B.; Korzyukov, A. I. (1991). "Numbers and distribution of Mute Swans Cygnus olor Whooper Swans C. cygnus and Bewick's Swans C. bewickii in the Black Sea area of the Ukraine, USSR". Wildfowl. Special Issue (1): 53–55.
- Ardamatskaya, T. B. (1998). "Numbers and status of waders on Dolgiy and Kruglyy Islands in the Black Sea Nature Reserve". International Wader Studies. 10: 256–260 – via SORA (Searchable Ornithological Research Archive), University of New Mexico.
- Ardamatskaya, T. B. (2001). "The Expansion of the Common Eider Somateria mollissima at Ukrainian Coast of the Black Sea". Acta Ornithologica. 36 (1): 53–54. doi:10.3161/068.036.0113 – via BioOne.
