= Tatyana Mokshanova =

Russian poet

Tatyana Petrovna Mokshanova–Shvetsova (born January 9, 1984, in Bagana) is a Russian poet, best known for her publications under the name Mokshanovon Tatyana in the Erzya language of the Erzyas people.
