= Tatiana von Landesberger =

Slovak-German computer scientist (born 1979)

Tatiana von Landesberger (born Tatiana Tekušová in 1979, also published as Tatiana Landesberger von Antburg) is a Slovak-German computer scientist who works as professor and chair for visualization and visual analytics at the University of Cologne. Her research concerns information visualization, graph drawing, and visual analytics.

== Education and career ==
Von Landesberger was born in 1979 in Bratislava. She studied financial mathematics as a student at Comenius University in Bratislava, earning a master's degree in 2003 with the thesis Commuting Flow Models supervised by Ján Bod'a. After working for the European Central Bank and then at the Fraunhofer Institute for Computer Graphics Research in Darmstadt, she began working at the Technische Universität Darmstadt in 2008, and completed a Ph.D. there in 2010, with the dissertation Visual Analytics of Large Weighted Directed Graphs and Two-Dimensional Time-Dependent Data, jointly supervised by Dieter W. Fellner and Jack van Wijk.

She continued at Darmstadt as head of the Visual Search and Analysis Group, and completed a habilitation in 2017 with the thesis Visual Data Comparison. She moved to the Karlsruhe Institute of Technology and then to the University of Rostock in 2020 before taking her present position at the University of Cologne.

== Recognition ==
Von Landesberger was named a Burgen Scholar of Academia Europaea in 2015.
