= Tatjana Muravjova =

Estonian politician (born 1949)

Tatjana Muravjova (born 13 January 1949 in Tallinn) is an Estonian politician. She was a member of X Riigikogu.
