= Tatyana Kudryavtseva =

Russian actress

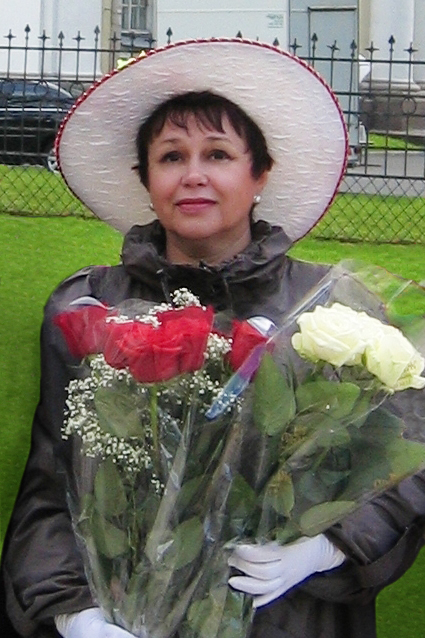
- Геннадий Егоров, 2007
- Born: Татьяна Сергеевна Кудрявцева/ Tatyana Sergeevna Kudryavtseva; 1 April 1953 (age 73); Leningrad (subsequently renamed), Soviet Union
- Education: Volkov Theater stage school Russian State Institute of Performing Arts
- Occupations: Stage actress screen actress radio-play actress
- Spouse: Gennady Egorov

Tatyana Kudryavtseva is a Russian and, until 1991, a Soviet stage and screen actor. Among her many awards, since 1996 she has been an Honoured Artist of the Russian Federation.

== Biography ==
Tatyana Sergeevna Kudryavtseva was born in Leningrad (as St. Petersburg was known at the time), a few weeks following the death of Stalin.

After becoming famous she was asked by an interviewer, in 1998, about her career choice. She said she decided as a child to become an actress to try and overcome her shyness. She explained her friend had taken all the lead roles in school plays. After leaving school, she moved to Yaroslavl, where she enrolled at the drama school attached to the Volkov Theater. Here, her teachers included Vladimir Salopov. Yaroslavl is only around 250 km from Moscow, and on weekends she was able to travel to the capital and attend drama productions at some of the best theatres in the Soviet Union. Kudryavtseva's passion for the theatre only grew, but after two months she fell ill with a severe sore throat and a fever. She was obliged to return home to Leningrad, where in agreement with her mother, she used the enforced period of unemployment to prepare herself to gain admission to the Russian State Institute of Performing Arts. Her original intention had been to establish herself in the provinces and then return to Leningrad with her reputation as a stage actress established. That was not quite how things had worked out. Nevertheless, when she graduated from the Institute in Leningrad in 1975, with a degree that qualified her for work as a stage and screen actress, she had already, during 1974, appeared at the city's Bryantsev Youth Theatre in at least five student productions. He teachers in Leningrad had included Zinovy Korogodsky and Lev Dodin. She continued to work at the Youth Theatre until 1985, appearing in an extraordinarily diverse range of roles. In Bambi she was a squirrel. There are suggestions that she spent "several lifetimes" in that squirrel suit, but there were also roles requiring deeper psychological insights. Much of the repertoire at the Youth Theatre in which she was involved consisted of dramas written expressly for children, for which her relatively diminutive physique was particularly well suited. There were, in particular, memorable productions of "The Cat that walked alone" and "Rainbow in Winter". Her performances in these and other productions earned her plaudits and awards including, in December 1977, the Polina Strepetova medal.

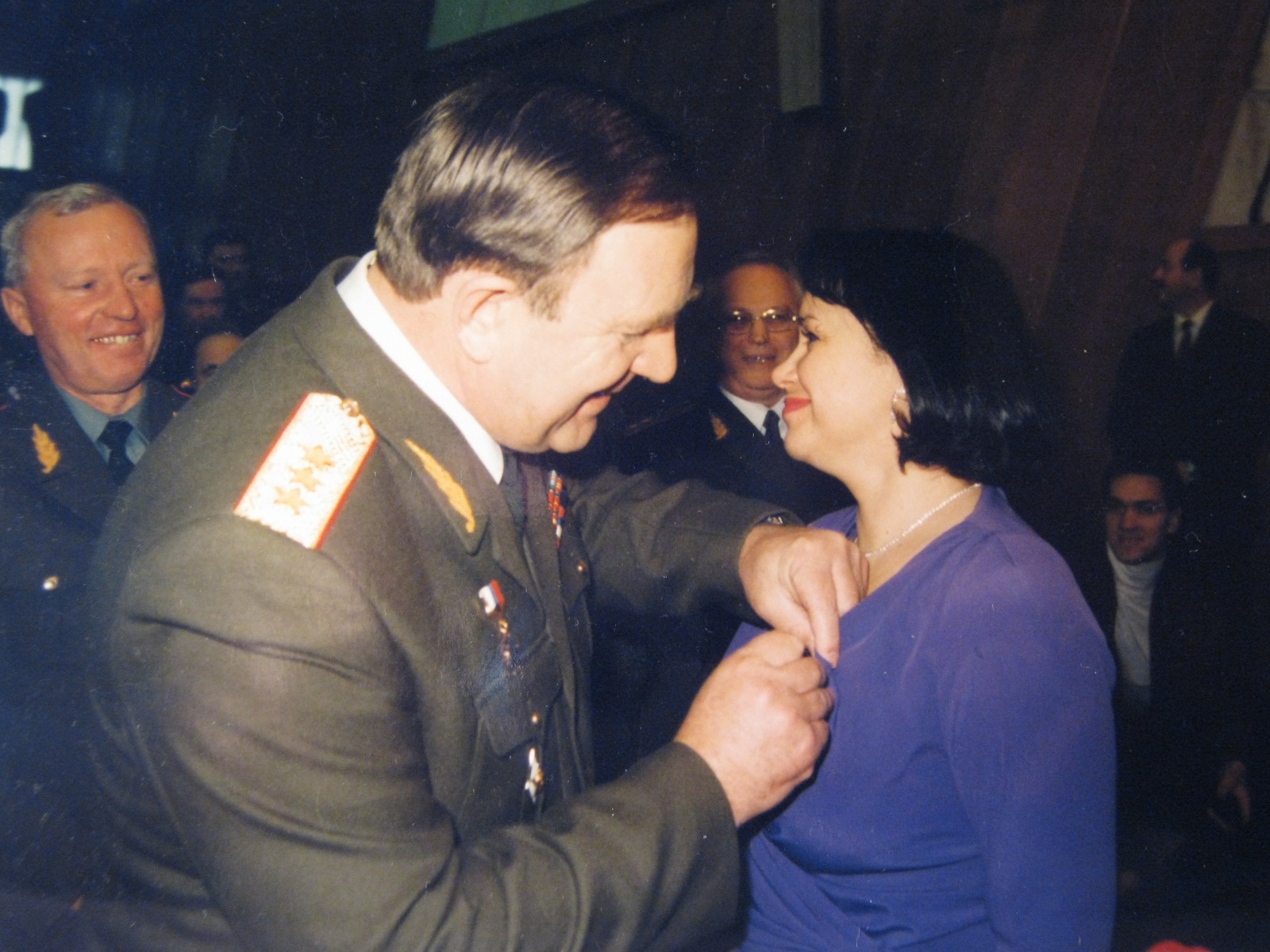
In 1996 Tatyana Kudryavtseva was awarded the title, Honoured Artist of the Russian Federation. The award was presented by Colonel-General Alexei Anokhin, chairman of the central council of the DOSAAF

Through this period, Kudryavtseva also found time to become increasingly involved as an actress in television and radio plays. She appeared as Princess Manya in the two-part television drama The Wasted Kingdom (Захудалое королевство) by Gleb Selyanin, filmed by Leningrad Television 1978. A milestone came in 1980, when Kudryavtseva starred alongside Boryslav Brondukov in Gennady Glagolev's feature film Big Conversation (Крупный разговор), produced at the Odessa Film Studio and released in 1981.

In 1985, she transferred to the Leningrad State Theatre, where her husband Gennady Egorov had taken over as theatre director the previous year. Here she created the role of Katya in Galin's 1985 production of the comedy Tamada, to widespread critical and public acclaim. She followed up in 1986, playing the role of "the good doll" in the opera-extravaganza staged by her husband of The Steadfast Tin Soldier by Sergei Banevich and Nikolay Denisov. In 1989, she appeared as Lilechki in Olga Kukchkina's Passion for Barbara (Страсти по Варваре). She also starred in her husband's production of the rock opera Gadfly (Овод) as the young Gemma (as a child, in the drama, identified as "Jim").

In parallel with her career as an actress, through this period Kudryavtseva was teaching drama at Secondary School II in the city's Petrogradsky District. Children's performances of Mowgli, Life of Mentush (Жизнь Ментуша) and The Tale of the Golden Cockerel (Сказка о золотом петушке) directed by Kudryavtseva earned enthusiastic reactions from audiences and a diploma from the city council's Committee for Family, Childhood and Youth affairs.

In 1990, Kudryavtseva became a leading actress at the St. Petersburg Drama Theatre "Patriot", which is a branch of the Russian Defence and Sports Technical Organisation (РОСТО/ROSTO). The purpose of the theatre is the patriotic education of Russian citizens. During her time at the "Patriot" Theatre she took on no fewer than 34 very different stage roles: she was widely commended by critics for her adaptability as a performer. A particular highpoint came in 2006, when Kudryavtseva created a complex and multifaceted portrayal of Empress Catherine in the second part of Nikolay Konyaev's dology, "Love and Death: Catherine the Great's Men".

Kudryavtseva undertakes an extensive programme of charitable activity and sponsorship, taking in military establishments, schools and colleges, and military veterans. In connection with her charitable works, she has been awarded numerous marks of public appreciation, including certificates of recognition and letters of gratitude for her work on the patriotic education of Russians.

== Personal life ==
Kudryavtseva is married to actor and theatre director Gennady Egorov. The couple's daughters, Kristina and Arina, were born in 1979 and 1983. They have recently become grandparents.
