= Tatjana Ostojić =

Serbian fashion designer

Tatjana Ostojić is a Serbian fashion designer who gained recognition for her eponymous label in Belgrade, Serbia, where she presented her collections four years in a row at Belgrade Fashion Week. She won the multiple "Best Designer" award at BFW and subsequently appeared in numerous media portals, including Elle, Kaltblut, Wannabe Magazine, Buro247, Vice, and national TV broadcasters such as Studio B, RTS, and many others.

After her career in Belgrade, she moved to Milan, Italy, where she received her master's degree in fashion accessory from Politecnico di Milano in 2019 and worked for prestigious brands such as Versace.

In 2022, Ostojić was commissioned as the first Serbian designer to create a special, limited-edition fashion collection for Mastercard's "Superhero" brand in collaboration with Serbia's National Association of Parents of Children With Cancer (NURDOR). The proceeds from the sales of the collection were designated to children in Serbia fighting cancer. The collection received several awards, including "Best Cross Media Integration" and "Best Innovation" at The Interactive Advertising Bureau Awards, as well as the "IAB MIXX Grand Prix" award.

Ostojić is also the founder of the first online archive of Belgrade's modernist architecture, called Belgrade Socialist Modernism. The archive has attracted over 50,000 organic followers on Instagram and garnered attention from media outlets such as Vice, BBC, Wannabe Magazine, and Emerging Europe.

Ostojić is also known for her work in inclusive fashion. In 2021, she collaborated with the Serbian prosthetics fashion start-up Pirate Art Belgrade, designing a collection of futuristic-looking leg-prosthetic covers for people with disabilities as a form of fashion accessory.
