= Tatjana Ljubišić =

Serbian politician

- Татјана Љубишић

Member of the Assembly of Vojvodina
- Incumbent
- Assumed office 9 February 2024

Personal details
- Born: 1972. Sremska Mitrovica, SAP Vojvodina, SR Serbia, SFR Yugoslavia
- Party: Together! (until 2024) Green-Left Front (2025-)

Tatjana Ljubišić (Serbian Cyrillic: Татјана Љубишић; born 1972) is a Serbian politician. She has served in the Vojvodina provincial assembly since February 2024. Elected for Together! (Zajedno!), she is now a member of the Green-Left Front.

== Early life and career ==
Ljubišić was born in Sremska Mitrovica, in what was then the Socialist Autonomous Province of Vojvodina in the Socialist Republic of Serbia, Socialist Federal Republic of Yugoslavia. She graduated from the University of Belgrade Faculty of Philology in the Arabic language department. Since 1996, she has been an English language teacher in Sremska Mitrovica.

== Politician ==
Ljubišić received the twentieth position on an independent electoral list called A City for All of Us in the 2020 Serbian local elections in Sremska Mitrovica. The list won eleven seats, and she was not elected.

She later appeared in the twenty-ninth position on the electoral list of the We Must (Moramo) coalition in the 2022 Serbian parliamentary election. The list won thirteen seats, and she was not elected.

For the 2023 parliamentary election, Together! joined a broad opposition coalition called Serbia Against Violence (SPN). Ljubišić received the 168th position on the list and was again not elected when the list won sixty-five seats.

=== Provincial representative ===
Ljubišić received the twenty-ninth position on the SPN list in the 2023 Vojvodina provincial election, which was held concurrently with the parliamentary vote, and was elected when the list won thirty seats. She was one of two Together! candidates elected to the provincial assembly in this cycle. The Serbian Progressive Party (SNS) and its allies won a majority victory, and the SPN parties serve in opposition. After the election, the Together! delegates joined an assembly group with the Democratic Party (DS) and the Movement of Free Citizens (PSG). In the assembly, Ljubišić serves on the security committee and the gender equality committee.

She appeared in the tenth position on the Sremska Mitrovica Against Violence list in the 2024 local elections and was not elected when the list won five seats. Formally, her endorsement was from the Democratic Party.

After Together! merged into the Democratic Party on 27 December 2024, Ljubišić joined Green-Left Front.
