= Tatiana Vivienne =

Central African human rights activist

- Occupation: Human rights activist

Tatiana "Tati" Vivienne is a human rights defender from the Central African Republic (CAR). She is the founder and director of Femmes Hommes Action Plus (FHAP - English: Women Men Action Plus), an organisation focused on helping the most marginalised and traumatised young women and girls.

== Early life ==
Tatiana Vivienne grew up on the edge of Bangui, one of ten children, four daughters and six sons. At the age of about five, her father had to move to Baboua in the north-west of the country for work, and she was educated there at a Catholic school. Because of instability in CAR at the time, her parents, who believed in the importance of a good education, had to send her to West Africa to complete her studies.

== Activism ==
After meeting women and children who had been targeted by the Lord's Resistance Army (LRA), Vivienne founded Femmes Hommes Action Plus (FHAP) in 2011. FHAP focuses on helping the most helpless, girls and young women who have been abandoned by everyone else and also helps reintegrate women into their communities, including those who have escaped from the LRA. Talking about FHAP, Vivienne has said: "We are the voice for the voiceless." Her organisation is one of a few which monitor, document and report human rights violations committed by the (LRA) in the Eastern region. FHAP also provides legal and psychological support to victims.

She has encountered numerous problems and challenges in running FHAP, including being forced to close the Bangui office, armed robberies of her house as well as chronic funding shortages.

== Personal life ==
Vivienne lives in Bangui, "close to her extended family".
