= Tatiana Rojas Leiva =

Chilean social anthropologist and politician

Tatiana Rojas
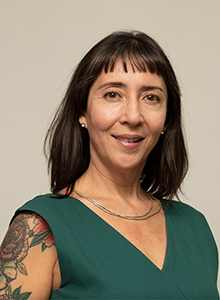

Undersecretary of Housing & Urbanism
- In office 11 March 2022 – 24 June 2023
- President: Gabriel Boric
- Preceded by: Guillermo Rolando
- Succeeded by: Carlos Araya Salazar

Personal details
- Born: 28 September 1972 (age 54) Santiago, Chile
- Party: Democratic Revolution
- Children: One
- Education: Bolivarian University of Chile; University of Chile (MA)
- Occupation: Politician
- Profession: Anthropologist

Tatiana Valeska Rojas Leiva (born 28 September 1972) is a Chilean social anthropologist and politician, member of Democratic Revolution (RD). Between March 2022 and June 2023, she served as undersecretary of Housing and Urbanism under the government of Gabriel Boric.

== Family and studies ==
She studied social anthropology at the Bolivarian University of Chile, and later completed a master's degree in anthropology and development at the University of Chile.

She is the mother of one daughter.

== Professional career ==
She has experience in social research, design and application of research instruments, project analysis and evaluation. During her professional career, she has worked mainly as a State official, with a career of sixteen years in the public sector. During the Concertación governments, she worked as national manager of the "Un Barrio para mi Familia" program, organized by the Solidarity and Social Investment Fund (Fosis), under the then Ministry of National Planning.

Later, during the first government of Michelle Bachelet, she joined the Ministry of Housing and Urbanism, where she served as a sector specialist in the Housing Policy Division, in addition to working in the Department of Attention to Vulnerable Groups. Likewise, during Michelle Bachelet's second government, she served as national manager of the social area of the "Camp Program". She also served as head of the critical project management team of the Housing Operations Department of the Housing and Urbanization Service (Serviu) in the Biobío region, an agency under the Ministry.

== Political career ==
Tatiana Rojas is a feminist and activist of the Democratic Revolution party (RD), where she led the party's "Political Formation Plan" during 2018, and later became the party's coordinator of the City and Territory Commission.
