= Acta Biomaterialia =

- Discipline: Biomaterials science
- Language: English
- Edited by: W.R. Wagner

Publication details
- History: 2005–present
- Publisher: Elsevier
- Frequency: Monthly
- Open access: Hybrid
- Impact factor: 9.7 (2022)

Standard abbreviations
- ISO 4: Acta Biomater.

Indexing
- CODEN: ABCICB
- ISSN: 1742-7061 (print); 1878-7568 (web)
- LCCN: 2005243536
- OCLC no.: 57180771

Links
- Journal homepage; Online access; Online archive

Acta Biomaterialia is a monthly peer-reviewed scientific journal published by Elsevier. It is published on behalf of Acta Materialia, Inc., and is sponsored by ASM International and The Minerals, Metals & Materials Society. The journal was established in January 2005. The editor-in-chief is W.R. Wagner (University of Pittsburgh). The journal covers research in biomaterials science, including the interrelationship of biomaterial structure and function from macroscale to nanoscale. Topical coverage includes biomedical and biocompatible materials.

Formats of publication include original research reports, review papers, and rapid communications ("letters").

== Abstracting and indexing ==
Acta Biomaterialia is abstracted and indexed in:

- Chemical Abstracts Service
- EMBASE
- EMBiology
- Elsevier BIOBASE
- MEDLINE/PubMed
- Materials Science Citation Index
- Science Citation Index Expanded
- Scopus

According to the Journal Citation Reports, the journal has a 2022 impact factor of 9.7.
