= Tatiana Godovalnikova =

Russian contemporary artist

- Born: Tatiana Vasilievna Godovalnikova; 31 December 1962 (age 63); Sevastopol
- Education: National Academy of Visual Arts and Architecture, Kiev, USSR 1990
- Style: Seascape, landscape, portrait, still life, icon painting
- Awards: Personalized Gold Medal named after Vasily Shukshin for contribution to Russian culture 2015

Tatiana Godovalnikova (Russian: Татьяна Годовальникова, 31 December 1962 in SevastopolUSSR) is a Russian contemporary artist. Museums in Russia, Germany and Japan as well as private collectors in Israel, Poland, Great Britain, Germany and Switzerland have Godovalnikova’ s art. Her works are presented also at Sevastopol Art Museum and the State Museum of Heroic Defence and Liberation of Sevastopol. In 1992 she became a member of the Union of Artists of Russia and the International Association of Art (IAA/ AIAP) – UNESCO.

== Biography ==
Tatiana Godovalnikova was born in the coastal city of Sevastopol in an artistic family with strong cultural traditions. Her father was both an artist and a writer. Her mother, Alexandra Sukhaya, is a famous Russian sculptor. From childhood Tatiana was surrounded by love to fine art, classical music and literature. At an early age she decided to become an artist inspired by the beauty of her parents’ artworks. Tatiana started to be interested in Russian Impressionism already from 15 years old. Her favourite Russian painter was and still is Konstantin Korovin.

== Education ==
1. Sevastopol Art School 1978.
2. The Art College named of N.S. Samokish 1984.
3. National Academy of Visual Arts and Architecture, Kiev, USSR 1990.

== Career ==
- 1984– The beginning of Tatiana's creative activity.
- 1986 – the active participation in various regional and international exhibitions.
- 1994–1999 – artistic director at the Sevastopol Youth theatre by staging 7 performances.
- 1992–2019 – participation in numerous group and solo exhibitions in Crimea, Ukraine, Russia, Montenegro, Morocco, Norway, Italy, UK, Germany, Japan, France and Switzerland.

== Exhibitions ==
=== Group exhibitions ===
- 1986 – regional Crimea Youth exhibition in Simferopol.
- 1992 – exhibition of aspirants in the Regional Artists Union exhibition hall in Simferopol.
- 1992 – joint exhibition of Crimean artists in Gütersloh, Germany.
- 1994 – joint exhibition of Crimean artists in Vladivostok, Russia, and further in Japan.
- 1999 – at Mitetz Art Gallery in Kiev.
- 1999 – at Yaroslavna Art Gallery in Kiev.
- 2000 – at Pektoral Art Gallery in Kiev.
- 2008 – at Stoletije Art Gallery, Central House of Artist in Moscow.
- 2011 – participation in the international plein air, Montenegro, International Fund for Cultural Heritage.
- 2012 – Anniversary Exhibition of Laureates of the International Fund for Cultural Heritage, St. Petersburg.
- 2012, 2014 – art resident Galleri Froya og Sommerakademiet, Norway.
- 2013, 2016 – art resident Cite Des Arts, Paris, France.
- 2014 – art resident Castello Di Boca, Montenegro.

=== Solo exhibitions ===
- 1990 – in the exhibition hall of the Union of Artists of Ukraine, Sevastopol.
- 1996 – in the exhibition hall of the Business and Cultural Center, Sevastopol.
- 1996 – in Private Gallery in Zurich, Switzerland.
- 1999 – exhibition at Or Art Gallery in Kiev.
- 2007 – in Art Museum, Sevastopol.
- 2008 – at Antiqua, Art Gallery in St. Petersburg.
- 2009 – at the Crimean House of Artist in Simferopol.
- 2009 – in State Duma of the Russian Federation, Moscow
- 2010 – in Gostiny Dvor, International Oil and Gas Club, Moscow.
- 2010 – in Bogolyubov Art Library, Moscow.
- 2011 – in Catherine Palace, Moscow.
- 2011 – in House of Journalists, Moscow.
- 2016 – at the Ministry of Foreign Affairs, Moscow.
- 2017 – at Headquarters of the UN, Days of Russian Culture, Geneva.
- 2019 – in the Federation Council of the Russian Federation.

== Types of art ==
=== Portrait ===
Primarily working in still life and landscape, Godovalnikova works primarely in portraiture and particularly depicting children and women. She is influenced by Camille Corot and other French Impressionists which helped her to develop own style with a sensitive portrayal of the subject matter and depth of colors.

=== Icon painting ===
At the beginning of the 1990s, Godovalnikova was hired by the Russian Orthodox Church as Icon painter. She is the most recognized icon painter in Sevastopol. Some of her works adorn the iconostases of many churches of sevastoplol... They are worshipped in the Cathedral of the Holy Equal-to-the-Apostles kn. St. Vladimir — the tomb of the outstanding admirals of the Russian Navy, in the St. George Monastery, in the village of Orlin – in the Church of Seraphim of Radonezh, in Balaklava. And two dozen icons – in the Pochayiv Lavra in the Ternopil region, in the cathedrals of Chernivtsi, in private collections in Sevastopol, Moscow, St. Petersburg, in the Netherlands.

== Awards ==
- "Portrait of mother", Sevastopol Art Museum.
- "Sunflowers", Sevastopol Art Museum
- "My Sevastopol", Sevastopol Museum of Heroic Defense and Liberation.
- Personalized Gold Medal named after Vasily Shukshin for contribution to Russian culture received in 2015.

== Gallery ==
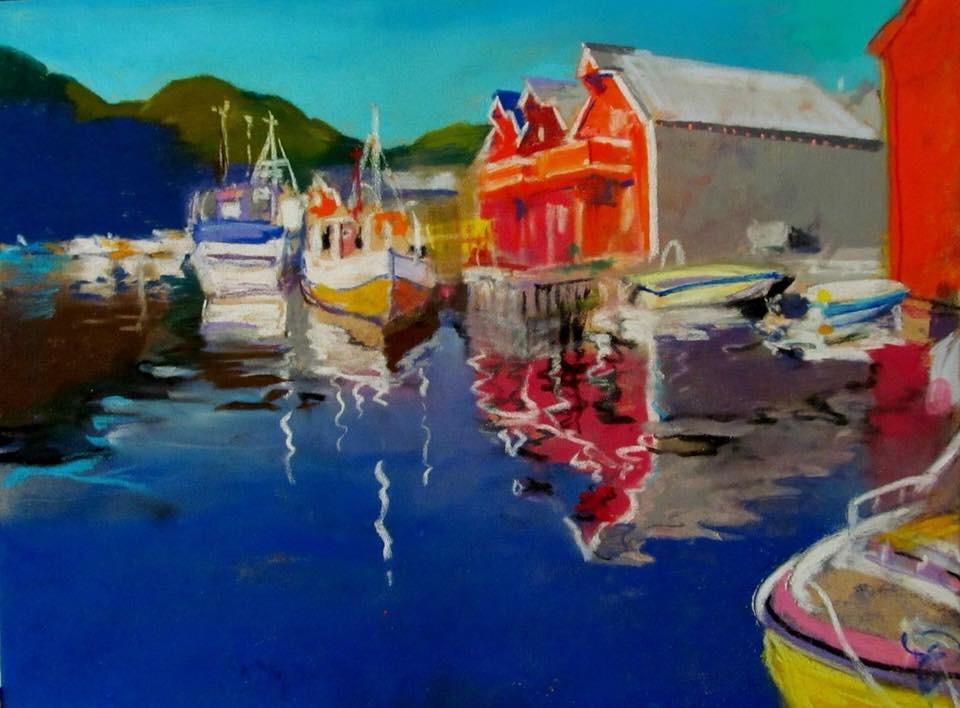
Tatiana Godovalnikova. "Blue solid of water". Oil on canvas

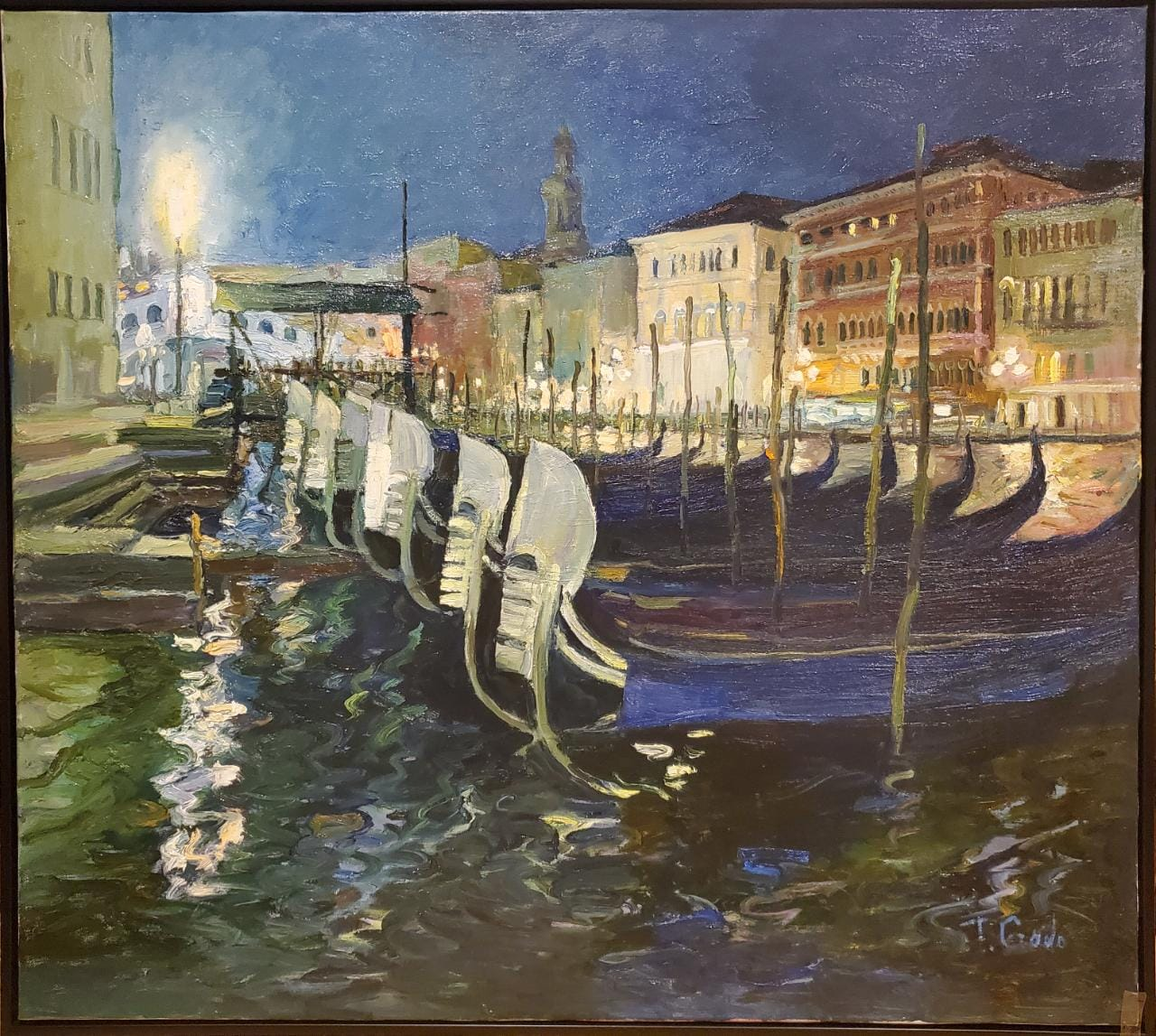
Tatiana Godovalnikova. "Night Venice". Oil on canvas

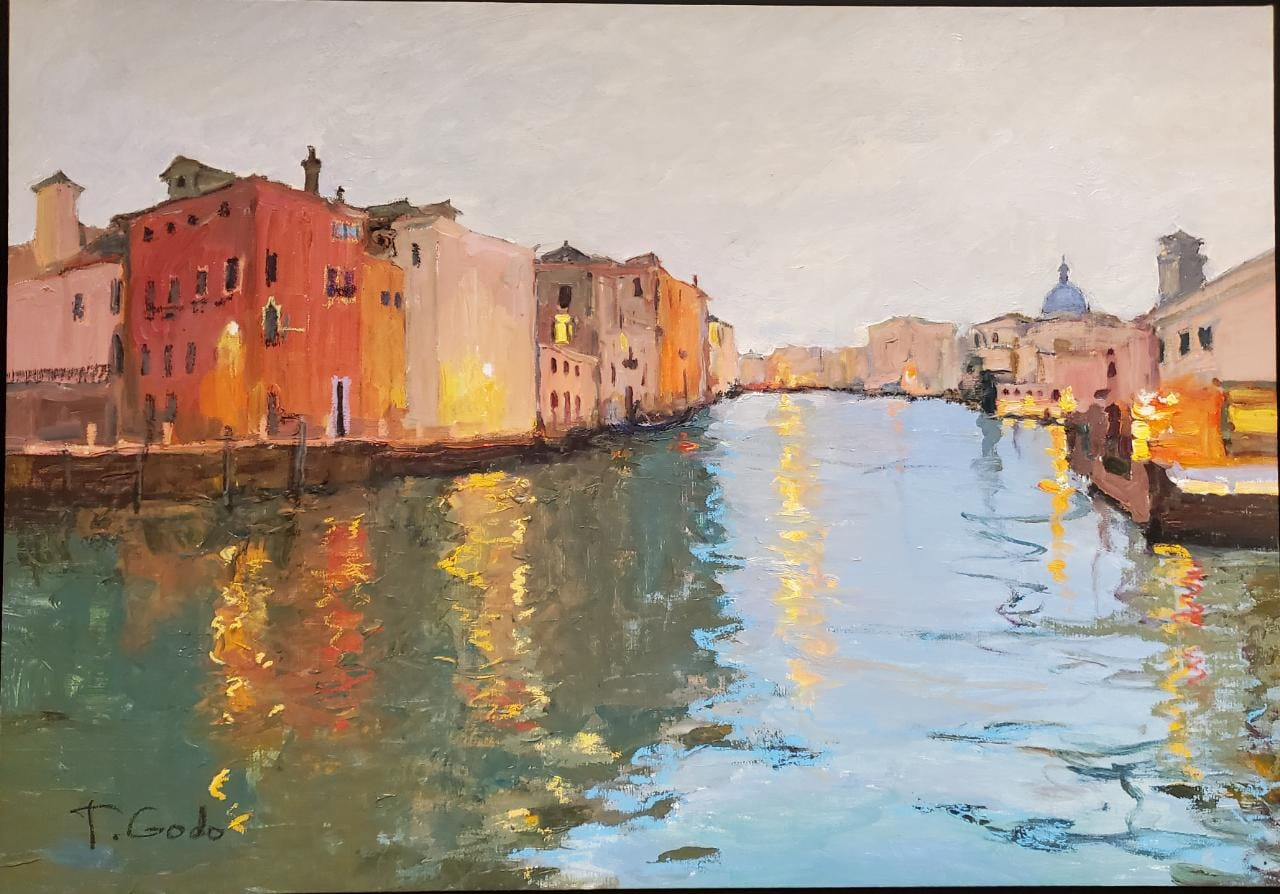
Tatiana Godovalnikova. "Channels and reflections". Oil on canvas

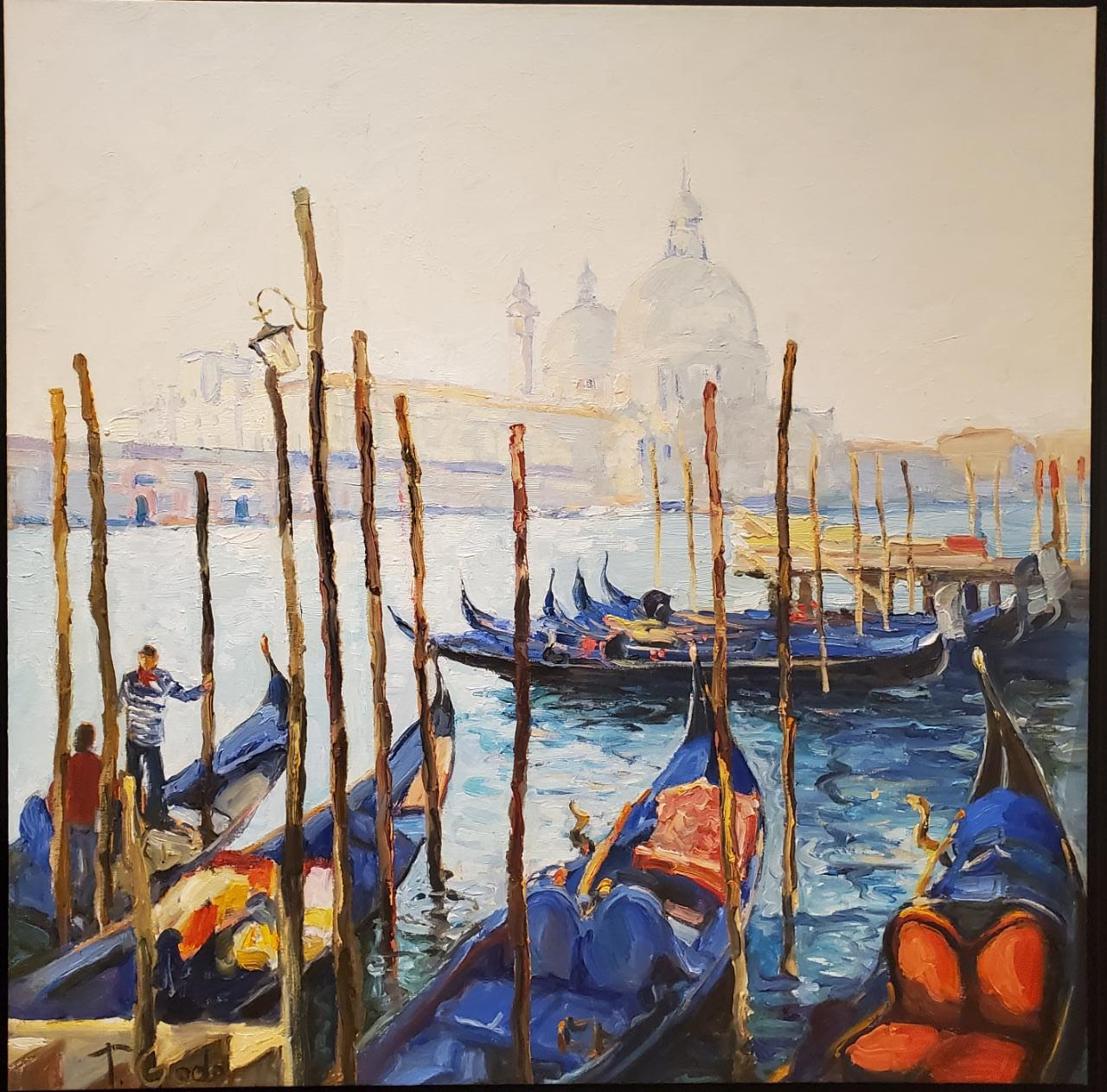
Tatiana Godovalnikova. Blue gondolas, 80x80 Oil on canvas
