= Tatiana Yusupova =

- Tatiana Alexandrovna Yusupova (1829—1879)
- Tatiana Nikolaevna Yusupova (1868—1888)
- Tatiana Vasilievna Yusupova (1769—1841)
