= Tatiana Morosuk =

Ukrainian mechanical engineer

Tatiana Morosuk (also transliterated as Tetyana Morozyuk) is a Ukrainian mechanical engineer whose research analyzes exergy, and especially the exergy of refrigeration systems. Educated in Ukraine, she works in Germany as chair for Exergy-Based Methods for Refrigeration Systems at Technische Universität Berlin, and is editor-in-chief of the Journal of Energy Resources Technology.

== Education and career ==
Morosuk has a 1990 diploma from the Odesa State Academy of Refrigeration. She completed a doctorate in 1994 and a habilitation in 2001, in Ukraine, and has worked in Germany since 2005. She has held the chair for Exergy-Based Methods for Refrigeration Systems at TU Berlin since 2013.

== Recognition ==
Morosuk is the 2021 recipient of the James Harry Potter Gold Medal of the American Society of Mechanical Engineers (ASME), "recognized for outstanding and innovative contributions to the science of theoretical and applied thermodynamics, particularly eminent teaching and research in the areas of advanced exergy-based methods, refrigeration and cryogenic processes, and electric power generation plants". She was the first female recipient of the medal. She was named as an ASME Fellow in 2025.
