= Tatiana Kyriushyna =

Ukrainian handball player (born 1989)

Personal information
- Nationality: Ukrainian
- Born: January 1, 1989 (age 37) Ukraine
- Height: 1.70 m (5 ft 7 in)

Sport
- Sport: Handball
- Position: Right Back
- Current club: Zağnos SK

Tatiana Kyriushyna (Ukrainian: Татьяна Кирюшина born 1989) is a Ukrainian handball player for Turkish club Zağnos SK.

She was with the Czech teams DHK Zora Olomouc and TJ Házená Jindřichův Hradec before she moved to Turkey playing for Trabzon HK and then for Zağnos SK.
