= Tatiana Baranova Monighetti =

Russian-Swiss musicologist

Tatiana Baranova Monighetti is a Russian musicologist living in Switzerland. She graduated with distinction from the Moscow Conservatory in musicology, piano and organ performance and subsequently studied there as a doctoral student in musicology. 1974-1990 she worked as a professor in the Music Theory department at the same institution (harmony, analysis, counterpoint, doctoral studies guidance). In the 1980s Monighetti developed the first course in Russia of studies on the history of notation for musicologists and an integrated course of music theory for performers. She gave guest lectures in Poland, France and the US and published over sixty articles in scholarly editions. Together with her husband, the well known cellist Ivan Monighetti, she organized the first International Early Music Festival in Russia (Moscow, 1986–1990).

In 1990 Monighetti moved with her family to Switzerland. She subsequently worked in the Escuela Superior de Musica Reina Sofia in Madrid and in the Musical Aсademy Basel. In recent years she has been living in Basel and has undertaken research at the Stravinsky archive in the Paul Sacher Stiftung (English: Paul Sacher Foundation) on his library, manuscripts and correspondence.

== Selected publications ==
Her latest English publications include:

- Stravinsky’s Russian Library // Stravinsky and His World, edited by Tamara Levitz (Princeton University Press, 2013), p. 61-77;
- In between Orthodoxy and Catholicism: The Problem of Stravinsky’s Religious Identity. // Igor Stravinsky: Sound and Gesture of Modernism. Edited by Massimiliano Locanto. Speculum Musicae, vol. XXV. Brepols, Turnout, 2014, p. 3-29;
- Working on "The Rite of Spring": Stravinsky’s sketches for the ballet at the Paul Sacher Stiftung // Igor Stravinsky: Sound and Gesture of Modernism. Edited by Massimiliano Locanto. Speculum Musicae, vol. XXV. Brepols, Turnout, 2014, p. 101-136;
- Russian Music in Stravinsky's Library. Mitteilungen der Paul Sacher Stiftung, No. 23, April 2015, p. 43-49
- Stravinsky, Roerich, and Old Slavic Rituals in "The Rite of Spring" // "The Rite of Spring" at 100. Edited by Severine Neff, Maureen Carr, and Gretchen Horlacher. With John Reef. Foreword by Stephen Walsh . Indiana University Press (in preparation).
