= Tatiana Erukhimova =

Russian–American physicist

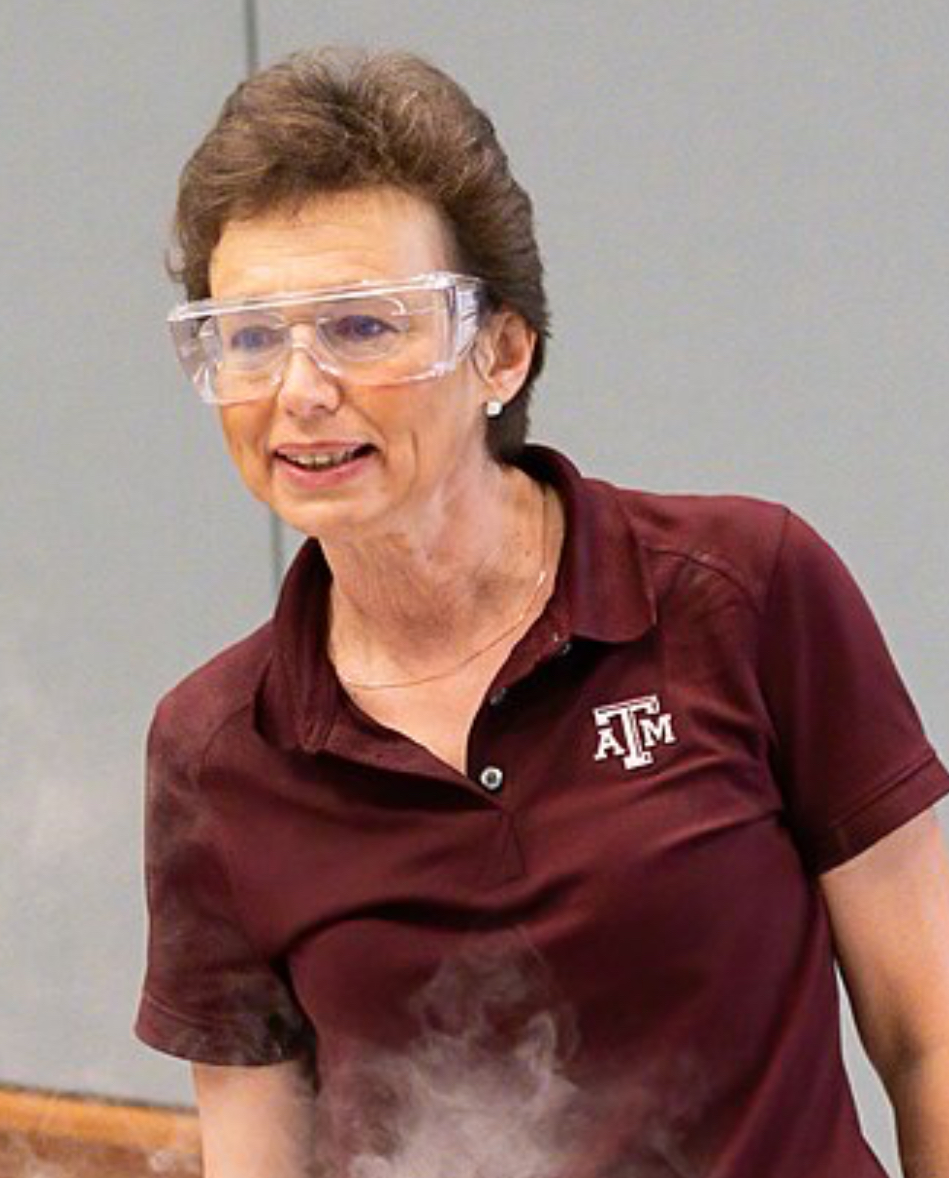
- Erukhimova in 2023
- Born: Nizhny Novgorod, Russian SFSR, Soviet Union

Academic background
- Education: N. I. Lobachevsky State University of Nizhny Novgorod (MS); Russian Academy of Sciences (PhD)

Academic work
- Institutions: Texas A&M University

Tatiana Lvovna Erukhimova (Russian: Татьяна Львовна Ерухимова) is a Russian-born American physicist. As a professor and The Marshall L’ 69 and Ralph F. Shilling ’68 Endowed Chair in the Department of Physics & Astronomy at Texas A&M University, Erukhimova was elected a Fellow of the American Physical Society "for developing and disseminating innovative physics education programs for college students and the public, and for organizing major science festivals in university settings". She was also elected a Fellow of the American Association for the Advancement of Science and a Fellow of the American Association of Physics Teachers.

== Early life and education ==
Tatiana Lvovna Erukhimova was born in Nizhny Novgorod in what was the Russian SFSR in the Soviet Union.

Erukhimova completed her Master's degree in Physics in 1987 from N. I. Lobachevsky State University of Nizhny Novgorod and her PhD in the same subject from Russian Academy of Sciences. Upon completing her PhD, Erukhimova accepted a postdoctoral research associate position at Texas A&M University.

== Career ==
Upon joining the faculty in the College of Science at Texas A&M in 2006, Erukhimova organized science outreach and service to the Texas community including DEEP (Discover, Explore, and Enjoy Physics and Engineering), Physics Show, Just Add Science, and Real Physics Live. She also co-organized the annual Mitchell Institute Physics Enhancement Program and co-authored the textbook Atmospheric Thermodynamics. In recognition of her efforts, Erukhimova was the recipient of Texas A&M's 2012 Distinguished Achievement Award for Teaching and Sigma Xi's 2014 Outstanding Science Communicator Award.

Following her promotion to Instructional Associate Professor and Outreach Coordinator for the Department of Physics and Astronomy, Erukhimova was named one of two recipients of the 2017 Presidential Professor for Teaching Excellence Award. While working in her new role, she was also selected to serve as Vice-Chair of American Association of Physics Teachers Committee on Science Education for the Public. In 2019, Erukhimova was elected a Fellow of the American Physical Society "for developing and disseminating innovative physics education programs for college students and the public, and for organizing major science festivals in university settings."

In 2021, Erukhimova and her colleagues conducted a review of 10,000 students to conclude there was no evidence that men outperform women in some science courses, specifically physics. Following this, she was appointed to 2021 University Professorships in Undergraduate Teaching Excellence at Texas A&M University and selected as one of the 2021 recipients of the Provost Academic Professional Track Faculty Teaching Excellence Award. In 2023, Erukhimova won the Dwight Nicholson Medal for Outreach from the American Physical Society for her efforts in engaging students and growing excitement about physics through education programs and across social media platforms. In 2024 she received the David Halliday and Robert Resnick Award for Excellence in Undergraduate Physics Teaching from the American Association of Physics Teachers

TikTok videos featuring Erukhimova went viral on social media, where she shows physics concepts at work through fun experiments. Her videos have been recorded and posted by the university's Physics and Astronomy Department on TikTok, with many garnering millions of views. The Texas A&M Physics & Astronomy Department TikTok page gained more than 1.5 million followers, more than 28.2 million likes, and more than 228 million views before moving to Instagram and YouTube. Erukhimova was featured on The Jennifer Hudson Show and Good Morning America.

== Publications ==
Her publications include:

- C. Garrett, A. Wang, J. Perry, and T. Erukhimova, Improving Out-of-Field Preparation of High School Physics Teachers, J. Undergrad. Rep. Phys. 33, 100001 (2023), https://doi.org/10.1063/10.0022465
- Jessi Randolph, Jonathan Perry, Jonan Phillip Donaldson, Callie Rethman, and Tatiana Erukhimova, Female physics students gain from facilitating informal physics programs, Phys. Rev. Phys. Educ. Res. 18, 020123 (2022). https://journals.aps.org/prper/abstract/10.1103/PhysRevPhysEducRes.18.020123
- Callie Rethman, Jonathan Perry, Jonan Phillip Donaldson, Daniel Choi, and Tatiana Erukhimova, Impact of informal physics programs on university student development: Creating a physicist, Phys. Rev. Phys. Educ. Res. 17, 020110 (2021). https://journals.aps.org/prper/abstract/10.1103/PhysRevPhysEducRes.17.020110
- Matthew Dew, Jonathan Perry, Lewis Ford, William Bassichis, and Tatiana Erukhimova, Gendered Performance Differences in Introductory Physics: A Study from a Large Land-Grant University, Phys. Rev. Phys. Educ. Res. 17, 010106 (2021).https://journals.aps.org/prper/abstract/10.1103/PhysRevPhysEducRes.17.010106
- Matthew Dew, Jonathan Perry, Lewis Ford, Dawson Nodurft, and Tatiana Erukhimova, Student Responses to Changes in Introductory Physics Learning due to COVID-19 Pandemic, The Physics Teacher, 59(3), 162–165, Mar 2021; https://doi.org/10.1119/5.0027816
- Jonathan D. Perry, Tatiana L. Erukhimova, and William H. Bassichis, 2019: New video resource for calculus-based introductory physics, design and assessment. I. Electricity and magnetism, American Journal of Physics 87, 335 (2019); https://doi.org/10.1119/1.5095140
- Erukhimova T., R. Zhang, and K. P. Bowman, 2008: The climatological Mean Atmospheric Transport under Weakened Atlantic Thermohaline Circulation Climate Scenario. Climate Dynamics,doi:10.1007/s00382-008-0402-x.
- Erukhimova T. L. and K. P. Bowman, 2006: Role of convection in global-scale transport in the troposphere. J. Geophys. Res., 111, D03105, doi:10.1029/2005JD006006.
- Bowman K. P., and T. L. Erukhimova, 2004: Comparison of Global-Scale Lagrangian Transport Properties of the NCEP Reanalysis and CCM3. J. of Climate, 17, 1135-1146.
- Erukhimova T.L., and E. V. Suvorov, 2001: Retrieval of the height profiles of ozone density and atmospheric temperature from ozone microwave absorption spectra, Radiophysics and Quantum Electronics, 44, 27-33.
- Erukhimova T.L., Tokman M.D., Trakhtengerts V.Yu., 1998: Quasilinear theory of interaction of gravity waves with shear flows, Physics of the Atmosphere and Ocean, 34, 827-834.
- Erukhimova T.L., Trakhtengerts V.Yu.,1995: A mechanism of atmospheric ozone disturbance by internal gravity waves in a stratified shear flow, Journ. Atm. Terr. Phys., 57, 135-139
- Mocheneva O.S., Erukhimova T.L., Suvorov E.V., 1995: Determination of the ozone content from microwave observations, Radiophysics and Quantum Electronics, 38, 751-770.
- Erukhimova T.L., Trakhtengerts V.Yu., 1994: Ozone disturbance by internal gravity waves in shear flows and possible observational appearance, Geomagnetism and Aeronomy, 34, 91-96.
- Kulikov Yu.Yu., Kuznetsov I.V., Erukhimova T.L., et al, 1994: Stratospheric ozone variability in high latitudes from microwave observations, J. Geophys. Res., 94, 21109-21116.
- Erukhimova T.L., Suvorov E.V., Trakhtengerts V.Yu., 1990: High-frequency electromagnetic emission of auroral ionosphere, Geomagnetism and Aeronomy, 30, 74-81.
