= Tatiana Mikhailovna Troepolskaya =

Russian actress and opera singer

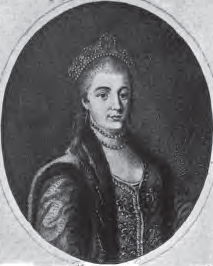
Tatiana Mikhailovna Troepolskaya

Tatiana Mikhailovna Troepolskaya (1744–1774) was a Russian stage actress and opera soprano. She is known as one of the first professional actresses in Russia.

She made her debut in Moscow in 1757, and was engaged at the Imperial Theatre in St Petersburg, where she became one of the leading stars alongside her spouse Vasily Alekseevich Troepolsky (1737–1800). She was foremost known for her roles in tragedies, and her most famed role was arguably the female lead of the Russian tragedy by Sumarokov, Mstislav.
