= Tatiana Yanovskaya =

Russian geophysicist and educator (1932–2019)

Tatiana B. Yanovskaya (11 August 1932 - 22 December 2019) was a Russian geophysicist and educator.

She studied physics at Leningrad State University (later Saint Petersburg State University) and completed a PhD at the Institute of Physics of the Earth in Moscow in 1958. From 1958 to 1960, she worked at the Pulkova seismological station. From 1960 to 1968, Yanovskaya was a junior researcher at the Leningrad division of the Mathematical Institute of the Russian Academy of Sciences. In 1968, she began working at the Department of Geophysics at Leningrad State University. In 1986, she became a full professor at Saint Petersburg State University.

Her areas of research include computer modelling of the propagation of surface waves and of tsunamis and determining variations in cross-sections of the Earth's crust and upper mantle based on seismic data.

She served on the editorial boards for the Russian journal Izvestiya, Physics of the Solid Earth and for the Chinese Journal of Geophysics. She was a lecturer for a series of workshops for young seismologists held by the International Centre for Theoretical Physics.

In 1982, along with three colleagues, she received the USSR State Prize for Science and Technique. In 1997, she was named a fellow of the American Geophysical Union. In 2002, she was awarded the Beno Gutenberg Medal.
