= Tatiana Sheykina =

Russian footballer (born 1991)

Personal information
- Date of birth: 14 November 1991 (age 34)
- Place of birth: Soviet Union
- Position: Defender

Team information
- Current team: WFC Yenisey Krasnoyarsk

Senior career*
Years	Team	Apps	(Gls)
2009–2010	Zvezda Zvenigorod	31	(0)
2011–2012	Mordovochka Saransk	27	(1)
2012–2015	WFC Rossiyanka	19	(0)
2016	ZFK CSKA Moscow	13	(0)
2017	Ryazan-VDV	5	(0)
2018–	WFC Yenisey Krasnoyarsk	13	(0)

International career
2015–	Russia	13	(0)
- * Club domestic league appearances and goals

Tatiana Sheykina or Tatyana Sheykina (born November 14, 1991) is a Russian footballer who plays as a defender for WFC Yenisey Krasnoyarsk at the Russian Women's Football Championship.

Sheykina was in the 23-players squad that represented Russia at the UEFA Women's Euro 2017, although she didn't play any of the team's matches in the competition.
