= Aleksey Malchevskiy =

Soviet ornithologist

Aleksey Sergeevich Malchevskiy
- Алексей Сергеевич Мальчевский
- Born: August 12, 1915; Petrograd, USSR
- Died: July 25, 1985 (aged 69); Luga, USSR
- Education: Leningrad State University
- Spouse: Tatyana Nikolayevna
- Awards: Order of the Red Star (USSR)
- Scientific career
- Workplaces: Leningrad State University
- Doctoral advisor: Valentin Dogiel

Aleksey Sergeevich Malchevskiy (Russian: Алексей Сергеевич Мальчевский; 12 August 1915 – 25 July 1985) was an ornithologist from the Soviet Union who served as dean of biology at the Leningrad State University (now Saint Petersburg State University) from 1969 to 1973. He studied cuckoos, avian behaviour, and calls, and influenced many ornithologists in the Soviet Union. He was a pioneers in examining evolutionary trends in philopatry and post-natal dispersal in birds.

== Biography ==
Aleksey was born to Sergey P. Malchevskiy, a professor of chemistry at Petrograd and Varvara Nikolayevna who was a graduate of the Smolny Institute. Alexey studied biology at Leningrad State University working towards a Ph.D. on the vertebrate fauna of the Transvolga region. He defended his thesis on 26 June 1941, the fourth day after the war broke out. His studies were interrupted by the war and he was drafted to the Leningrad Front and later in Belarus where he served as commander of an infantry platoon. He was wounded by machine gun fire at Königsberg on 20 February 1945 and left for dead. Badly injured and bleeding, he crawled and narrowly escaped death. A thick book in which he kept his bird observations had several bullets embedded in it. After the war he returned as a biology faculty at Leningrad State University. He wrote his habilitation thesis under Professor Valentin Dogiel and obtained a Dr. Biol. Sc. in 1958, then became a professor and guide to more than 30 students, including Roald L. Potapov and Vitaly Bianki, Jr. During the Stalinist era, Malchevskiy's assistance was sought to prove Trofim Lysenko's theory that the cuckoo was not a distinct species of birds and that it was the result of changing the diet of a warbler.

A major contribution to ornithology was his work on philopatry and post-natal dispersal of birds.

Malchevskiy helped produce documentary films on bird nesting and on the capercaillie. His studies included those on cuckoo brood parasitism. His extensive recordings of bird sounds and notes are stored at the St. Petersburg State University. He was decorated for his services by an Order of the Red Star.

Malchevskiy was married to Tatyana Nikolayevna (née Tretyakova), and they had two daughters.
