= Tatiana Matveeva =

Tatiana Matveeva may refer to:

- Tatiana Matveeva (footballer) (born 1990), Georgian footballer playing in Turkey
- Tatiana Matveeva (weightlifter) (born 1985), Russian weightlifter
