= Tatiana Dettlaff =

Russian developmental biologist and embroyologist

Tatiana Antonovna Dettlaff (Russian: Татьяна Антоновна Детлаф; 1912–2006) was a Russian developmental biologist known for her pioneering research on oocyte growth and maturation in sturgeons, a group of ancient fish species facing significant conservation challenges. A key aspect of her work involved developing methods for the artificial propagation of sturgeons through hormonal induction of spawning, controlled fertilisation, and embryo rearing.

Dettlaff was Professor Emeritus of the Kol'tsov Institute Developmental Biology, Russian Academy of Sciences, where she headed the Filatov Laboratory of Experimental Embryology for more than 20 years. She was an honorary member of the Russian Academy of Natural Sciences, and a member of the International Society of Developmental Biologists. Dettlaff was the recipient of A.O. Kowalevsky Prize, the most important scientific award in Russia in the field of developmental biology.

== Early life and education ==
Dettlaff was born in Malakhovka, Moscow to Sofia Aronovna and Anton Losifovich. Her mother was a physician, and her father was a teacher who headed the pedagogical and agricultural training colleges in Volokolamsk from 1918 to 1929.

After graduating from a seven-year school and completing two courses of training college, Dettlaff appeared and passed the entrance exams for the biology department of the second Moscow Pedagogical Institute in 1925. However, she failed to secure admission as a few slots were reserved for the children of employees. She enrolled in the Simferopol Pedagogical Institute instead, and a few months later, transferred to the first Moscow State University after the biological faculty announced additional admission spots. She joined the Department of Developmental Dynamics under Mikhail Zavadovsky, a Russian and Soviet biologist specialising in the reproductive biology of livestock.

During her third year, while at the Zvengorod Biological Station, Dettlaff attended a practical course on microsurgery in developmental mechanics, conducted by scientist and embryologist Dmitriy Filatov. Although she was interested in the field of developmental mechanics, Dettlaff did not follow Filatov for her diploma work because she wanted to work in phenogenetics. In response, Filatov invited her to the Institute of Experimental Biology and introduced her to the director Nikolai Koltsov, who proposed that she work on a project entitles Morphology of embryonic lethaIs in Drosophila. Koltsov hired Dettlaff as a technician, where she looked after axolotls who regularly became ill and died. Over the next two months, she struggled to obtain, fix, embed and cut eggs, but Filatov continued to be an encouraging presence. During this time, Dettlaff became interested in the specific structural features of the ectoderm in anura, which had been sidelined by embryologists. After her graduation in 1933, Filatov proposed she join postgraduate school under his guidance; Dettlaff agreed much to the dismay of Koltsov who did not forgive this decision until he died.

In 1937, Dettlaff defended her candidate (PhD) thesis on Development of the Nervous System in Anura with Special Reference to Organizer Action after which she went on a two-tear hiatus to take care of her ailing mother.

== Career ==
After graduating, Detlaff briefly worked in the embryological laboratory of Alexei Zavarzin, who was best known for his research on the evolutionary and comparative aspects of histology. He had moved from Leningrad to Moscow with his department and wanted Filatov to head the Laboratory of Experimental Embryology at All-Union Institute Experimental Medicine. Unfortunately, the laboratory shuttered within a year, and Detlaff transferred to the Institute of Evolutionary Morphology, USSR Academy of Sciences in 1939 after Ivan Schmalhausen hired her as a supemumerary research worker.

During the Second World War, Detlaff evacuated from Moscow to Chuvashia and then Kazakhstan, where she worked at the Laboratory of Developmental Dynamics run by Mikhail Zavadovsky at the Kazakh branch of the USSR Academy of Sciences. Here, she studied multiple pregnancy of sheep, visiting state and collective farms to introduce shepherds and zoo technicians to Zavadovsky's method of obtaining polycarpous farm animals in sheep husbandry.

In 1943, Dettlaff returned to Moscow with her father and son; her son died soon after. Later, she started working on her doctoral dissertation under the guidance of Schmalhausen. By late-1947, Dettlaff had completed the first volume of her thesis Structure and Properties of Ectoderm, Chordamesoderm, and their Derivatives in Different Species of Anamnia exploring the history of the theory of germ layers. She defended her thesis before the VASKHNIL (Soviet Academy of Agricultural Sciences) in early-1948, however, the confirmation of her degree was postponed after Lysenko prohibited the study of genetics in the USSR. The laboratories of Schmalhausen and Dragomirov, where she worked, were closed.

The rise of Lysenkoism resulted in the persecution of around 3,000 biologists, and Dettlaff believed her "dismissal was imminent." During this time, she struggled to find work; her and fellow-scientist Anna Ginsburg were informed that they cannot be hired as technicians at the Laboratory of Farm Animals because of their "ideological mistakes." When the remaining laboratories of the former Institute of Experimental Biology and Evolutionary Morphology were merged, Prof. Vasiliĭ Vasil'evich Popov invited them to his laboratory. The laboratory was headed by Filatov until his death 1943, after which Popov took over. Dettlaff and Ginsburg proposed a study on the "development of the sturgeon fish with special reference to their artificial reproduction and breeding." They were later joined by biologist Alexander Zotin. Their study initiated a widespread trend of developmental biology studies focusing on the morphology and physiology of the sturgeon fish, oocyte maturation, and the relative criteria of biological time. Dettlaff recalls that while artificial breeding of sturgeon fish was important, many researchers at the time, including embryologists, cytologists, morphologists, ichthyologists, biochemists, and molecular biologists, became more involved in the field because they were forced to consider alternative study streams after Lysenko's campaign against genetic research. This renewed focus on the development of artificial reproduction in sturgeon fish allowed Dettlaff's team to propose numerous recommendations and instructions, as well as write manuals and monographs.

Together with Ginsborg and Schmalhausen, Dettlaff co-authored Sturgeon Fishes: Developmental Biology and Aquaculture (1993), the first comprehensive description of development of the acipenserid fish. Published in the English language, the book comprised results from 40 years of studies on the topic. In a 1997 interview, Dettlaff said that oocyte maturation, and embryonic and prelarval development in the sturgeon fish now compared, based on the degree of available knowledge, with the development of amphibians and even exceeded it in some aspects. She believed that because oocytes and eggs of sturgeon were a "very convenient object of study," the knowledge will continue to expand. She also noted the growing international interest in the task of preservation and reproduction of sturgeon.

During Dettlaff's trip to China, she learned more about the experiments being conducted by Tchou Su to study the maturation of toad oocytes in a saline with pituitary suspension. This inspired her to identify the mechanism and dynamics of oocyte maturation using experimental-embryologicaland molecular-biological methods. After the first results were published from her research, this system was "rapidly appraised and, within a few years, studies of oocyte maturation and meiosis control became a central problem of developmental biology." In 1988, she co-authored Oocyte Growth and Maturation with S. G. Vassetzky, proving that "during oogenesis, not only vast reserves of ribosomes and mitochondria, of yolk, carbohydrates, and lipids, and of enzymes for protein and nucleic acid synthesis and for carbohydrate and fat metabolism are formed but long-lived mRNA and proteins are synthesized." The book was significant in raising the knowledge of oogenesis, detailing "the use of molecular biology methods, electron microscopy, autoradiography, and microsurgical methods of experimental embryology in studying the pre-embryonic development of animals."

One of Dettlaff's most notable scientific contributions was "the development of relative criteria of biological time, comparable in different animals and at different optimal temperatures." In early 1960s, while studying the duration of embryogenesis in sturgeons, she found that "the duration of different periods of embryogenesis underwent proportional changes when the temperature varied within the limits of the zone of optimal temperatures." A similar pattern was documented for amphibians, teleostean fish, and other invertebrate animals by Galina Mikhailovna Ignatieva. Taking these observations into account, Dettlaff, along with her brother, physicist Andrei Dettlaff, proposed a method for relative characteristics of the duration of development. The results from this research were published in Experimental Species for Developmental Studies (1990) by a several authors, including Dettlaff and Sergei Georgievich Vassetzky, showing that "the shortest cell cycle during synchronous divisions of the nucleus in early development can be used as a time unit comparable in most poikilothermic animals and that the duration of various developmental periods and processes changes proportionally with temperature." The time unit was named “Detlaf” by biologist Alexander Neifakh, and was used in developmental biology studies to predict "the timing of different processes at different temperatures and elucidation of temporal patterns of development, including the genetic program of developmental time." At the time, this data had not been generalized and was not accessible to the wider community of biologists. Dettlaff noted that the existing literature contained discrepancies regarding the definition of these units and the methods regarding their determination. She felt necessary to maintain the recommendations of using this method, and to generalize the results from her studies to warn other researchers against the possible errors in application of the method. Her goal was to ensure that the measurable and comparable biological time becomes an integral part of research. Today, this method is used by scientific laboratories for improving the biotechnology of fish breeding.

== Awards and recognition ==
In 1954, Dettlaff received the USSR Academy of Sciences Prize. In 1957, she became one of the first Soviet scientists to be elected as a member of the International Institute of Embryology, which eventually reorganized into the International Society of Developmental Biologists. She was on the editorial board and later the editorial council of Ontogenez (Russian Journal of Developmental Biology) since its inception in 1969. In 1972, she received the Alexander Onufrievich Kovalevsky Prize, set up in 1940 by the USSR Academy of Sciences and the Russian Academy of Sciences, for her research on the embryology of fish and amphibians. In 1981, she was awarded the silver medal by VDNKh (Exhibition of Achievements of National Economy).

In 1994, Dettlaff became an honorary member of the Russian Academy of Natural Sciences. For several years, she was a member of the National Committee of Soviet Biologists, and rallied for Soviet scientists to attend international developmental biology conferences and congresses.

== Death ==
Dettlaff died on October 24, 2006. She was 94 years old.
