= Tatiana Vishnevskaya =

Internatioanal producer

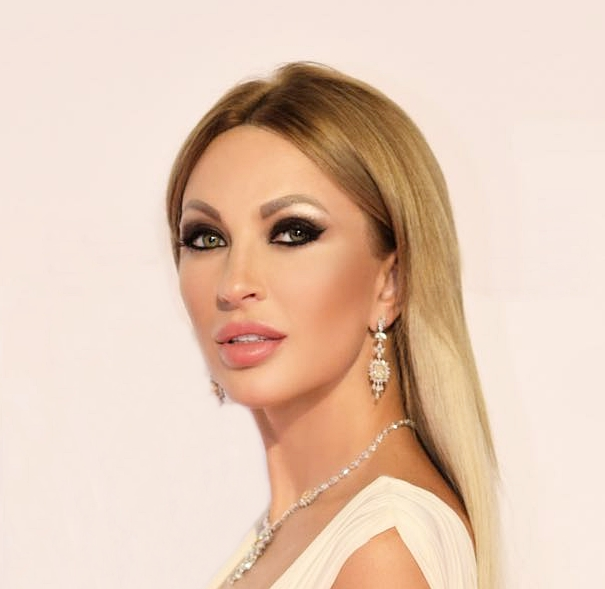
- Born: Tatiana Vishnevskaya; 13 August 1985 (age 41); Székesfehérvár, Hungary
- Education: Ostankino Technical Center
- Occupations: TV Presenter, Media Entrepreneur
- Years active: 2005 - Present

Tatiana Vishnevskaya born 13 August 1985 is a UAE TV presenter, author of TV and Radio programs and media entrepreneur. CEO and Founder of the media company of MME Media in Dubai.

Tatiana Vishnevskaya is also vice-president of a non-profit organization called Sail of Hope with consultative status in the United Nations Organization.

== Education ==
Vishnevskaya graduated from Minsk State Linguistic University, specialising in teaching foreign literature (English and American) and received a bachelor's degree in linguistics.

In 2005, she entered MITRO - Moscow Institute of Television and Radio Broadcasting Ostankino, specializing in radio and television. At the announcers' school took classes from Tatiana Vladimirovna Vishnevskaya. Practiced as an editor in the directorate of special projects on Channel One, worked at the directorate of sports programs on TV channel "Russia-2".

In 2008, she also attended the Academy of Media Industry and took elocution classes from Svetlana Kornelievna Makarova.

2018-2019 — graduated the Academy of Media Industry with a degree in Television Producer, Moscow.

== Career ==
Tatiana started as an editor and creafive produver of special projects on the government First Federal TV Channel, Moscow.

2008 to 2011 — Presenter of economic programs such as: "Markets" and "Companies and Corporations" on the radio station Business FM, Moscow.

September 2011 — opened as a TV Presenter the federal channel "Moscow 24" with the mayor of Moscow Sergey Sobyanin.

October 2011 — successfully started business programs on "Kommersant FM" Radio station and "Kommersant TV".

August 2012 — TV presenter of economy news at "Channel 360".

December 2012 — Prime time TV Presenter, presented programs "Business Morning", "Business Day", "Breaking News", and "News of the Russian and foreign press" at the First Federal Russian Business Television, RBC-TV.

July - October 2013 —Tatiana Vishnevskaya was invited to join Moscow State University - Academician V.Sadovnichiy, as a media advisor to the rector. Where she created University Media Center.

November 2013 — launched 2 business author TV projects "New Technologies" and "Business and Media with Tatiana Vishnevskaya" on "PRO Business" TV Channel, Moscow, Russia.

2016– 2018 — runed her author project "Luxury lifestyle with Tatiana Vishnevskaya" on the Russian AUTO Radio, UAE.

2017 — joined “Russian Emirates” publishing house as a creative producer and as the author of articles of the publishing house "Russian Emirates" about luxurious lifestyle.

September 2017 — launched a new trend in business education, Tatiana Vishnevskaya’s unique project “The Success Story”. The presentation meeting was held with students and teachers of the Department of Finance and Banking, RANEPA.

2013 - present — Founder and CEO of MME Media, Dubai.

== Cultural contribution ==
Tatiana and Moscow mayor Sergey Sobyanin participated in the formation and opening of Russian TV channel Moscow 24. She presented news on the first federal business channel RBC-TV. She took part in the economic forums in Davos and St. Petersburg with top officials.

Tatiana Vishnevskaya has worked for a long time at the strengthening economic and cultural relations between Russia and the countries of the Middle East, in particular, the UAE. In the Emirates was awarded by the ambassador and the consul of the Russian Federation, as well as by other diplomats and military attachés.

Held numerous ambassadorial events. Constantly participated in the activities of the ruling family of United Arab Emirates. Created authorial programs with their participation that further contributed to the strengthening of the relations between the countries. In 2016 hosted Balkan & GCC Athletics Awards2016 under the patronage of Sheikh Ahmad bin Mohammad bin Hasher Al Maktoum, shooter from the United Arab Emirates, who won the first ever Olympic medal for his country.

Tatiana was invited as VIP media person to Dubai International Film Festival in 2016 to highlight and represent the activity of Festival with all of the international and Arab film professionals, Oscars, Golden Globes and BAFTAs winners.

Sheikha Hend Al-Qasimi, who in turn is a diplomat, Cultural Ambassador of the UAE and also a member of the ruling family of Sharjah, wrote about the cultural contribution of Tatiana Vishnevskaya.

== TV Projects ==
Synchronizes commercials on the radio and TV of banking services, security systems and restaurants.

2016 — participated in TV project “The Lady and the Peasant” in the international season on Ukrainian channel "TET”.

June 2016 — was invited to the project "From Ladette to Lady" on TV channel “Novyi Kanal“ as an Independent Expert and Judge.

2017 — the authorial project "The Magnificent East with Tatiana"™️ was launched on the Ukrainian TV channel "City Life".
