= Tutta =

Tutta is a feminine name. People with this name include:

- Tutta Rolf (born Solveig Jenny Berntzen; 1907–1994), Norwegian-born Swedish actress and singer
- Tutta Jew, Finnish singer
- Tutta Larsen (born Tatyana Anatolyevna Romanenko, 1974), Ukrainian television presenter
- Suzann Pettersen (born 1981), Norwegian golfer nicknamed "Tutta"
