= Tatian (disambiguation) =

- Tatian the Assyrian, Christian writer and theologian of the 2nd century
- Tatian or Tatianus the Deacon, companion of Saint Hilarius of Aquileia, d c 284
- Antonius Tatianus, Roman politician of the 4th century
- Eutolmius Tatianus, Roman consul in 391.
- Tatianus (consul 466), Roman consul in 466.
