= Ad hoc (disambiguation) =

Ad hoc is a Latin phrase meaning "to this".

Ad hoc or Ad Hoc may also refer to:

- Ad hoc hypothesis, a sometimes dubious method of dealing with anomalies in philosophy and science
- Ad hoc network, a type of technology which allows network communications on an ad hoc basis
  - Smartphone ad hoc network, wireless ad hoc networks using smartphones
  - Vehicular ad hoc network (VANET), a proposed type of road vehicle network
  - Wireless ad hoc network, a decentralized type of wireless network
- Ad hoc polymorphism, a programming technique that lets the same function or operator work differently depending on the type of input data
- Ad Hoc (restaurant), a restaurant in Yountville, California
  - Ad Hoc at Home, a 2009 cookbook by the restaurant's chef Thomas Keller and a collaborator
- ADHOC, the Cambodian Human Rights and Development Association, Cambodia's oldest human rights NGO
- AdHoc Studio, the American video game developer
- Ad hoc testing, a term referring to software testing without test case documentation
- List of ad hoc routing protocols, control mechanisms for network packet routing
