= Timothy Hollingsworth =

American chef and restaurateur (born 1980)

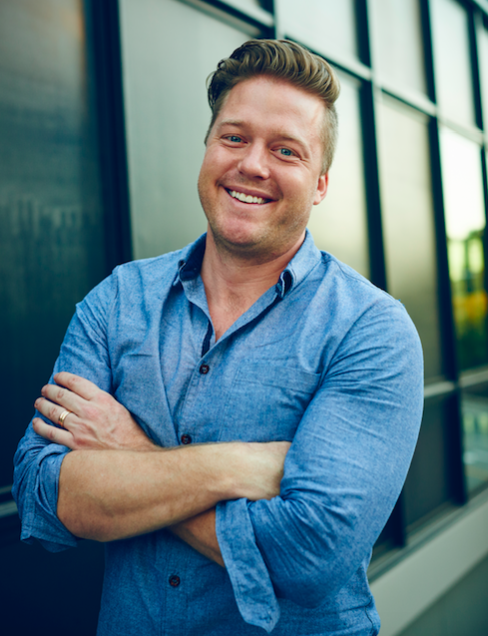
- Born: Timothy Wayne Hollingsworth; January 30, 1980 (age 46); Houston, Texas, U.S.

Timothy Hollingsworth (born January 30, 1980) is an American chef and restaurateur. He spent more than a decade at The French Laundry in Yountville, California, becoming chef de cuisine in 2009. That year, he represented the United States at the Bocuse d'Or, where he placed sixth. He received the James Beard Foundation Award for Rising Star Chef of the Year in 2010.

After leaving The French Laundry in 2012, Hollingsworth moved to Los Angeles. He later became involved in several restaurant projects across the United States, including concepts in Los Angeles, New York, and Washington, D.C. Hollingsworth won the Netflix cooking competition The Final Table in 2018 and has subsequently appeared as a contestant, host and judge on culinary television programs.

== Life and career ==
Hollingsworth was born in Houston, Texas, and raised in the community of Grizzly Flats near Placerville, California. He began working in restaurants as a teenager, initially as a dishwasher, and entered professional cooking without attending culinary school.

In 2001, Hollingsworth joined The French Laundry as an apprentice. He subsequently worked his way through the restaurant's kitchen and, in 2004, was selected to assist with the opening of Thomas Keller's New York restaurant Per Se. He later became a sous chef at The French Laundry before becoming chef de cuisine in 2009. The San Francisco Chronicle profiled Hollingsworth as the restaurant's chef de cuisine in 2010.

In January 2009, Hollingsworth represented the United States at the Bocuse d'Or culinary competition in Lyon, France, finishing sixth. The following year, he received the James Beard Foundation's Rising Star Chef of the Year Award and was selected as one of the San Francisco Chronicle's Rising Star Chefs.

Hollingsworth left The French Laundry in 2012 and moved to Los Angeles. In 2015, he became the chef of Otium in downtown Los Angeles adjacent to The Broad contemporary art museum. Restaurant critic Jonathan Gold reviewed Otium for the Los Angeles Times in 2016, examining Hollingsworth's approach to contemporary American cooking. Otium was later included in the Los Angeles Times's 2018 list of 101 notable Los Angeles restaurants.

Otium closed in September 2024 after nearly nine years in operation. In a year-end review of notable restaurant closures, the Los Angeles Times credited Otium with helping shape downtown Los Angeles's developing dining scene and with establishing Hollingsworth as a chef-restaurateur.

In 2018, Hollingsworth competed on the Netflix series The Final Table, winning the competition. He later competed on Food Network's Tournament of Champions and Beat Bobby Flay, and became a judge on the PBS series The Great American Recipe. He also appeared with B. J. Novak in the Roku special Chain Food: All-Star Dishes.

In 2021, Hollingsworth co-founded Chain, a Los Angeles dining concept created with B. J. Novak and other partners that serves reinterpretations of food associated with American chain restaurants.

In 2025, Hollingsworth became chef partner of Hundredfold, a brasserie at Belmont Park Village in Elmont, New York, developed with Patina Group. In 2026, he joined Ten Five Hospitality on The Oak Room and Bernadette's in the Georgetown neighborhood of Washington, D.C. That year, Hollingsworth also announced Alphabet Bar & Grill with Hwood Group and Rick Caruso at Palisades Village in Los Angeles.

== Awards and recognition ==
- Bocuse d'Or — sixth place, 2009
- James Beard Foundation Award — Rising Star Chef of the Year, 2010
- San Francisco Chronicle — Rising Star Chef, 2010

== Television appearances ==
Selected television appearances include:

- Top Chef — guest judge
- The Final Table — contestant and winner
- Tournament of Champions — contestant
- Beat Bobby Flay — contestant
- Beachside Brawl — guest judge
- The Great American Recipe — judge
- Chain Food: All-Star Dishes — featured host
