= Ron Siegel =

American chef (born 1966)

- Born: August 12, 1966 (age 59); Manhattan, New York, U.S.
- Education: California Culinary Academy
- Culinary career
- Cooking style: French

Ron Siegel (born August 12, 1966) is an American chef who formerly worked in San Francisco. In August 2012, it was announced he was joining San Francisco restaurant, Michael Mina, as executive chef. He had been Chef of the Dining Room at the Ritz-Carlton Hotel, taking over for Chef Sylvain Portray in 2004. Siegel is perhaps best known for his 1998 appearance on Iron Chef, becoming the first ever U.S. citizen to win in Kitchen Stadium. His cooking style is known for blending haute French cuisine with subtle Japanese touches.

== History ==
Ron Siegel was born on August 12, 1966, in Manhattan. He moved to the San Francisco Bay Area with his family at the age of 7. Siegel attended Palo Alto High School. Siegel broke into the culinary world at the age of 16 working as a butcher in Palo Alto, California, at a local grocery store.

Siegel enrolled at the California Culinary Academy in San Francisco. In 1991 he went to work as a line cook at Aqua Restaurant, a seafood restaurant in San Francisco. His first mentor was the chef at Aqua, George Morrone.

In 1993, Siegel moved to New York to work at Daniel, and returned a year later to work at The French Laundry in Yountville, California, as an opening sous-chef to Thomas Keller. In 1996, Siegel left The French Laundry to become Chef of Charles Nob Hill in San Francisco, which specialized in a fusion of French and California cuisine. In 1999, while he was the executive chef of Charles Nob Hill, Siegel was selected as one of Food & Wine Magazine's 10 "Best New Chefs in America." In 2001, Siegel left Charles Nob Hill to become executive chef of Masa's of San Francisco. Siegel remained at Masa's until June 2004 when he took over the Dining Room of the Ritz-Carlton Hotel, where he focused on French cuisine with a Japanese influence. The name of his venture at the Ritz-Carlton Hotel, "Parallel 37", was inspired by the geographic latitude near San Francisco. In 2012, Siegel left Parallel 37 to become the executive chef at Michael Mina.

During 2016, he was the executive chef and partner of Rancho Nicasio in Nicasio, California. In April 2017, Siegel announced he was opening Madcap in San Anselmo, California, in the summer of 2017. In 2023, Madcap was given a Michelin Star, the only restaurant in Marin, California, to earn one.

== Iron Chef ==
In 1998, Siegel travelled to Japan to appear as the second U.S. born challenger on the popular TV show Iron Chef (after chef Patrick Clark in October 1997), with help from then-mayor of San Francisco Willie Brown who asked for FujiTV (owner and producer of Iron Chef) to accept Siegel as a challenger. Siegel faced Iron Chef French Hiroyuki Sakai in a battle using the theme ingredient lobster. Siegel produced five dishes:

1. Egg Royale
2. Lobster Cream Soup with scallops and truffles
3. California Salad with lobster, basil oil, tomato concasséed and avocado
4. Lobster ravioli with sweet corn sauce
5. Lobster and foie gras in fig sauce

In the end, Siegel swept Sakai 4–0.
