= Adam Tihany =

Romanian-born American architect

Adam D. Tihany
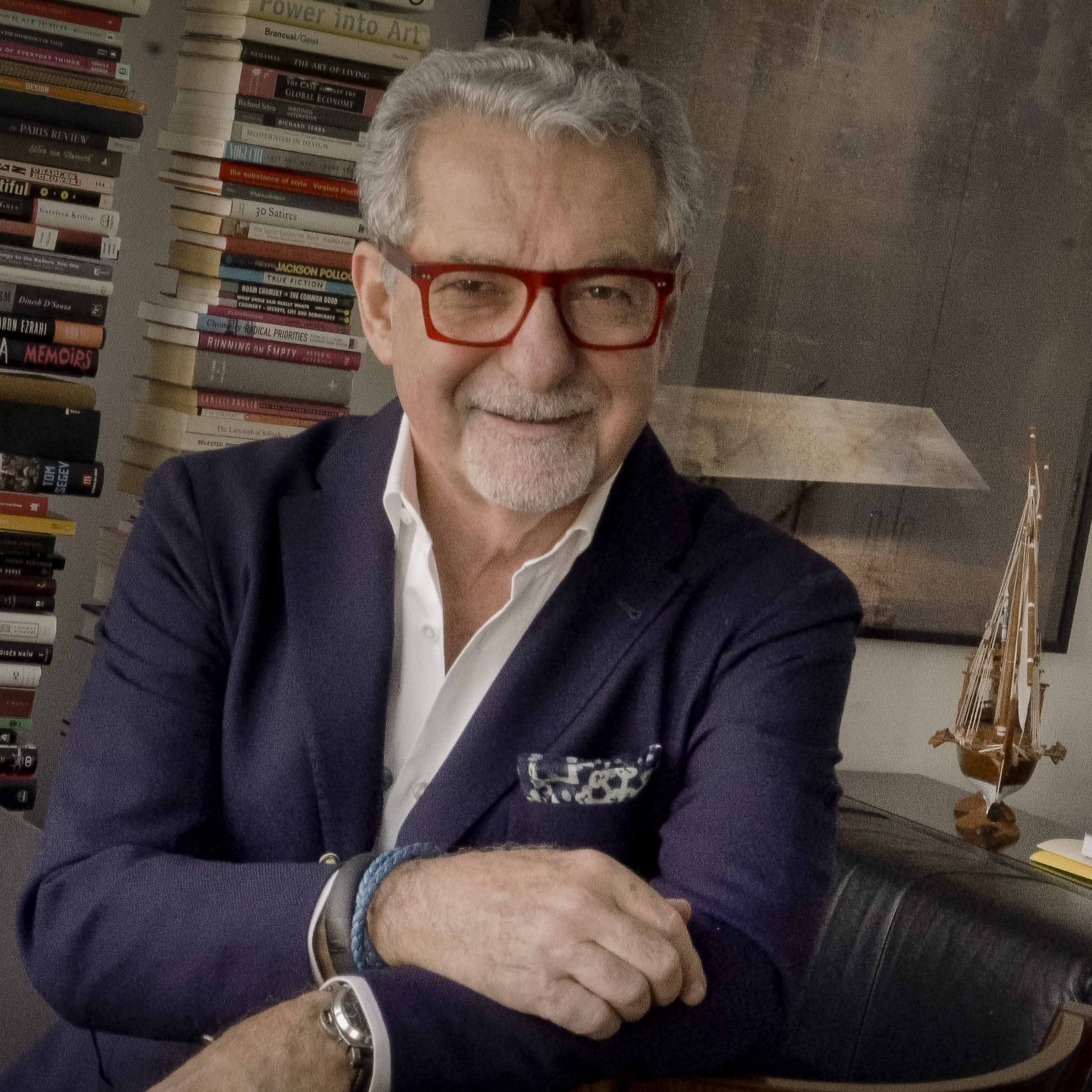
- Born: Adam David Tihany; 1 January 1948 (age 78); Transylvania, Romania
- Education: Politecnico di Milano
- Occupation: Hospitality designer
- Years active: 1978–present
- Title: Principal of Tihany Design
- Website: www.tihanydesign.com

Adam D. Tihany (born: Transylvania in 1948) is a hospitality designer based in New York. He founded the multidisciplinary design firm Tihany Design in 1978, and is considered the origin of the title "restaurant designer". His firm has designed hotel and dining properties at many properties around the world. Tihany was named one of the greatest American interior architects by The New York Times in 2001.

== Early life and education ==
Born in Transylvania, Adam D. Tihany spent his childhood in Jerusalem and later studied architecture at the Politecnico di Milano in Italy. He took his first opportunity to move to America, and in 1978, he established his own multidisciplinary New York design firm. In 1981 he designed La Coupole in New York City. He is often credited as being the first self-labeled "restaurant designer". His early years working in the foodservice industry prompted him to become co-owner of Remi restaurants in 1987, together with partner and executive chef Francesco Antonucci.

== Career ==
=== Restaurant design ===
Tihany has built his career around the art of hospitality. In the restaurant industry, he collaborated with acclaimed culinary stars such as Thomas Keller, Daniel Boulud, Jean-Georges Vongerichten, Charlie Palmer, Heston Blumenthal, Paul Bocuse, and Pierre Gagnaire. Tihany has created several restaurants for Chef Thomas Keller, including the Per Se and Bouchon restaurants, as well as recently opened The Grill on Seabourn Quest. He worked extensively with the Maccioni family, collaborating on eight projects including Le Cirque 2000, Osteria del Circo and the contemporary Italian restaurant, Sirio. Chef Daniel Boulud and the designer have created three restaurants together, including Boulud’s flagship, Daniel, in New York City.

In 2004, Tihany designed the decor for a pool-side restaurant in San José del Cabo, Mexico. His lantern design was then available for purchase.

=== Hotels ===
Tihany’s hotel work can be found in One & Only Cape Town resort in South Africa, Waldorf Astoria Las Vegas, Westin Chosun in Seoul, The Joule in Dallas, The King David Hotel in Jerusalem, The Beverly Hills Hotel, The Breakers in Palm Beach, The Broadmoor in Colorado Springs, and the Four Seasons Dubai DIFC.

Tihany worked on Holland America and Seabourn vessels, slated for delivery between 2016-2018. He served as Creative Director for Costa Cruises, overseeing a team of design firms in the development of the company's ships.

=== Product design ===
Tihany has licensed product lines for several companies: Pace Collection and McGuire; Villeroy & Boch and Schönwald china, hardware for Valli & Valli; lighting for Lucifer and Baldinger and linens for Frette. His long-standing association with Christofle has resulted in Collection 3000, Urban flatware, and K + T Hollowware designed with Thomas Keller. He recently collaborated with Poltrona Frau in the creation of The Stanley Chair, which debuted in the company’s new home theater collection in spring of 2016.

In 1998, Tihany designed a martini glass as a prop for an advertisement which he later began selling, on a limited basis, for $550 a piece.

== Honors and awards ==
Tihany's contribution to design has been recognized with honors and awards including an Honorary Doctorate from the New York School of Interior Design and induction into the Interior Design Hall of Fame in 1991. Tihany was recognized by Who’s Who in Food and Beverage in the United States by The James Beard Foundation in 1997, named Bon Appetit's Designer of the Year in 2001, and awarded the prestigious Lawrence Israel Prize from the Fashion Institute of Technology in 2005. He was appointed Art Director of The Culinary Institute of America in 2011 and currently sits on Pratt Institute’s Board of Trustees.

== Books ==
- Tihany Design, Monacelli Press, 1997
- Tihany Style, Mondadori Electa, 2004
- Tihany: Iconic Hotel and Restaurant Interiors, Rizzoli, 2014

== Notable projects ==
Hotels

- Aleph Rome, 2003
- Casa MANNI Roma
- Four Seasons Dubai International Financial Centre
- Four Seasons Resort Dubai at Jumeirah Beach
- The Joule Hotel Dallas
- Mandarin Oriental Geneva
- Mandarin Oriental Las Vegas
- Landmark Mandarin Oriental, Hong Kong
- One & Only Cape Town
- The Beverly Hills Hotel
- The Westin Chosun Seoul
- King David Hotel, Jerusalem
- The Breakers, Palm Beach
- The Belmond Grand Hotel Europe, St. Petersburg
- The Time New York

Restaurants

- Amber, Landmark Mandarin Oriental, Hong Kong
- Apsleys London, 2008
- At.Mosphere, Burj Khailfa, Dubai
- Aureole Las Vegas
- Aureole New York City
- Bar Boulud London
- Bar Boulud Boston
- Bocuse at The Culinary Institute of America
- Bouchon Beverly Hills
- Daniel New York
- Dinner London
- Flagler Steakhouse at The Breakers
- HMF at The Breakers
- Huberts
- Metro
- Oro Restaurant, Belmond Cipriani Hotel, Venice
- Per Se New York
- Saffron Dubai
- Sirio
- Sirio at The Pierre New York
- The Line Singapore
- Veranda
- The Grill by Thomas Keller, Seabourn Quest

Cruise Ships

- Ms Koningsdam, Holland America Line, 2016
- Celebrity Solstice, RCCL, 2011
- Encore, Seabourn, 2016

Exhibits

- Dining Design Milan, 2004
- GrandHotelSalone Milan, 2002
- Abitare Il Tempo Venice, 2001
- Borsa Internazionale del Turismo BIT, 2003
