= Michael Ruhlman =

American author and entrepreneur (born 1963)

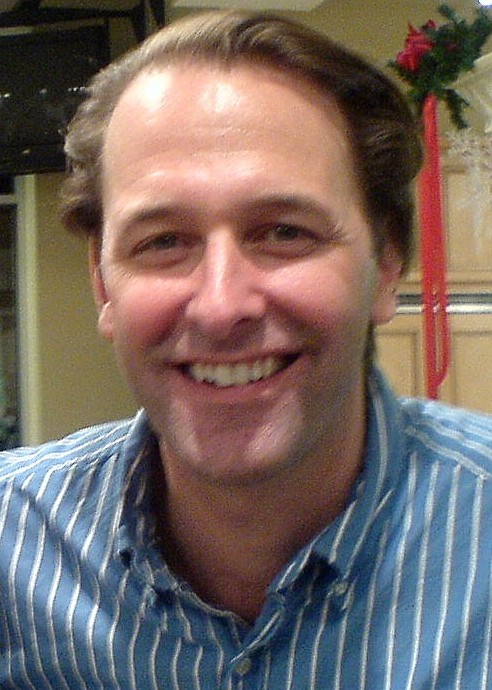
- Michael Ruhlman
- Born: July 28, 1963 (age 63); Cleveland, Ohio, United States
- Occupation: Author
- Spouse: Ann Hood (m. 2017)
- Writing career
- Language: English
- Genres: Non-fiction, food writing

Michael Carl Ruhlman (born July 28, 1963) is an American author, home cook and entrepreneur.

He has written or co-authored more than two dozen books, including non-fiction, fiction, memoir, and books on cooking. He has co-authored many books with American chefs, such as Thomas Keller, Eric Ripert, Michael Symon and Jean-Georges Vongerichten.

== Early life ==
Michael Carl Ruhlman was born in Cleveland, Ohio. He attended University School, a private, independent all-boys' day school in Cleveland's suburbs, and completed his undergraduate education at Duke University.

== Career ==
Ruhlman worked a series of odd jobs (his first job after college was copy boy at The New York Times) and traveled before returning to his hometown in 1991, to work for a local magazine.

While working at the magazine, Ruhlman wrote an article about his old high school and its new headmaster, which he expanded into his first book, Boys Themselves: A Return to Single-Sex Education (1996).

For his second book, The Making of a Chef (1997), Ruhlman enrolled in the Culinary Institute of America, taking a variety of classes but not graduating, to produce a first-person account—of the techniques, personalities, and mindsets—of culinary education at the prestigious chef's school. The success of this book produced two follow-ups, The Soul of a Chef (2000) and The Reach of a Chef (2006).

Ruhlman has also collaborated with chef Thomas Keller to produce the cookbooks The French Laundry Cookbook (1999), Bouchon (2004), Under Pressure (2008), and Ad Hoc At Home (2009), Bouchon Bakery (2012); with French chef Eric Ripert and Colombian artist Valentino Cortazar to produce the lavish coffee-table book A Return to Cooking (2002); and with Michigan chef Brian Polcyn to produce Charcuterie: The Craft of Salting, Smoking and Curing (2005) and Salumi: The Craft of Italian Dry Curing (2012). In 2009 Ruhlman also collaborated with fellow Clevelander and Iron Chef Michael Symon on Symon's first cookbook Live to Cook.

Ruhlman is the winner of two James Beard Awards, the 1999 award for magazine feature writing and the 2012 general cooking award for his book Ruhlman's Twenty, and has been nominated seven other times by the foundation.

2007, he produced The Elements of Cooking based on the structure of the classic grammar book The Elements of Style. The book includes essays about the importance of fundamentals in cooking such as heat, salt and stock, along with a reference guide to cooking terms. Much of the insight in the book is based on his previous food-related experiences at the Culinary Institute of America and from working with celebrity chefs.

2009, he published Ratio: The Simple Codes Behind the Craft of Everyday Cooking, a book that explores basic preparations—bread, pie dough, custards—and explains that knowing the proportions of the ingredients by weight can free users from strict adherence to recipes.

Ruhlman has eagerly embraced social and digital media in his mission to encourage more people to cook food for themselves and their friends and family, creating, with digital media expert Will Turnage, the Ratio App for smart phones, and Bread Baking Basics for the iPad and Kindle Fire.

In 2011, he published Ruhlman's Twenty: 20 Techniques, 109 Recipes, a Cook's Manifesto, a book distilling cooking to its 20 basic techniques. Ruhlman's Twenty: The Ideas and Techniques that Will Make You a Better Cook won the 2012 James Beard Foundation Award in the general cooking category and the International Association of Culinary Professionals cookbook award in the Food and Beverage Reference/Technical category.

In the mid-2012, Ruhlman published Salumi, a follow-up to Charcuterie about Italian dry-cured Italian meats, which he wrote with Brian Polcyn. The Bouchon Bakery cookbook, another collaboration with Thomas Keller and the TKRG team, was released in the fall of 2012. Ruhlman also released his first Kindle single book called "The Main Dish" which is about his long journey to become a food writer and then "The Book of Schmaltz: A Love Song to a Forgotten Fat" a single-subject cookbook devoted to the ingredient called schmaltz; rendered chicken fat flavored with onion which is popular in Jewish cuisine. "Schmaltz" was released as an app in December 2012 and was published as a hardcover book in August 2013.

Spring, 2014, Ruhlman published Egg: A Culinary Exploration of the World’s Most Versatile Ingredient. In late 2014, he published Ruhlman's How To Roast: Foolproof Techniques and Recipes for the Home Cook, the first in a series of short books devoted to cooking technique rather than recipes. The second, How To Braise, was published in the spring of 2015. How To Saute was published in the spring of 2016.

In the fall of 2015, he published his first fiction, In Short Measures: Three Novellas, stories about love in middle age and his first non-food-related work since his 2005 memoir.

May 2017 Ruhlman released his book Grocery: The Buying and Selling of Food in America.

In October, he published From Scratch: 10 Meals, 150 Recipes and Techniques You Will Use Over and Over, a book that looks at ten staple meals and explores all that can be learned from each.

In 2021, Michael Ruhlman collaborated with Gabriel Kreuther for Gabriel Kreuther: The Spirit of Alsace, a Cookbook. The book is about the chef and his eponymous restaurant along with classics from Alsatian cuisine with a foreword by Jean-Georges Vongerichten.

Most recently, he published "The Book of Cocktail Ratios" and two realistic, young adult novels, "If You Can’t Take the Heat" (2024) and "A Taste of Somewhere Else" (2026).

=== Television ===
Ruhlman has acted as a judge on the PBS reality show Cooking Under Fire and on The Next Iron Chef.

== Personal life ==
Ruhlman married writer Ann Hood in 2017 in Abingdon Square Park in New York. He has two children from his previous marriage to photographer Donna Turner, with whom he collaborated on many publications. He lives in New York City.

== Bibliography ==
- Boys Themselves (1996)
- The Making of a Chef (1997)
- The French Laundry Cookbook (1999) by Thomas Keller, with Susie Heller and Michael Ruhlman
- The Soul of a Chef (2000)
- Wooden Boats (2001)
- A Return to Cooking (2002), with Eric Ripert and Valentino Cortazar
- Walk On Water: Inside an Elite Pediatric Surgical Unit (2003)
- Bouchon (2004) by Thomas Keller and Jeffrey Cerciello, with Susie Heller and Michael Ruhlman
- Charcuterie: The Craft of Salting, Smoking and Curing (2005) by Michael Ruhlman and Brian Polcyn
- House: A Memoir (2005)
- The Reach of a Chef: Beyond the Kitchen (2006)
- The Elements of Cooking (2007)
- Under Pressure: Cooking Sous Vide (2008)
- Ratio: The Simple Codes Behind the Craft of Everyday Cooking (2009)
- Ad Hoc at Home (2009) by Thomas Keller, Michael Ruhlman
- Live to Cook (2009) by Michael Symon, with Michael Ruhlman
- Ruhlman's Twenty (2011)
- Salumi: The Craft of Italian Dry Curing (2012) by Michael Ruhlman and Brian Polcyn
- Bouchon Bakery (2012) by Thomas Keller, Sebastian Rouxel, Michael Ruhlman
- The Main Dish (2012)
- The Book of Schmaltz: A Love Song to a Forgotten Fat (2012)
- Egg: A Culinary Exploration of the World's Most Versatile Ingredient (2014)
- How To Roast : foolproof techniques and recipes for the home cook (2014)
- How To Braise (2015)
- In Short Measures: Three Novellas (2015)
- How To Sauté (2016)
- Grocery: The Buying and Selling of Food in America (2017)
- From Scratch: 10 Meals, 150 Recipes and Techniques You Will Use Over and Over (2019)
- Pâté, Confit, Rillette: Recipes From the Craft of Charcuterie (2019) by Brian Polcyn and Michael Ruhlman
- Gabriel Kreuther: The Spirit of Alsace, a Cookbook (2021)
- The Book of Cocktail Ratios: The Surprising Simplicity of Classic Cocktails (2023)
- If You Can’t Take the Heat (2023)
- Meat Pies: An Emerging American Craft (2024) by Brian Polcyn and Michael Ruhlman
