= Under Pressure (cookbook) =

2008 cookbook by Thomas Keller and Michael Ruhlman

- Cover of Under Pressure
- Author: Thomas Keller and Michael Ruhlman
- Illustrator: Deborah Jones
- Language: English
- Subject: Cookbook
- Published: 17 November 2008 (Artisan)
- Publication place: America
- Media type: Print
- Pages: 295
- ISBN: 978-1-57965-351-4

Under Pressure: Cooking Sous Vide is a 2008 cookbook written by American chefs Thomas Keller and Michael Ruhlman. The cookbook contains a variety of sous-vide recipes, a technique Thomas Keller began experimenting with in the 1990s. The recipes in Under Pressure are those prepared in Thomas Keller's The French Laundry and Per Se restaurants. The book also contains sous-vide cooking techniques and tips, including discussions of cooking time, food temperature, and food safety.

Under Pressure has been called a definitive sous-vide cookbook. Tam Ngo of Serious Eats found that Under Pressure's recipes "resist compromise and restrict substitution" and "are not always appropriate outside of the restaurant kitchen", due in part to the expensive equipment required to cook the dishes. Publishers Weekly found that the recipes were "so artfully arranged they would not be out of place in a modern art museum". The Washington Post was also ambivalent, finding that Under Pressure's recipes "can be made only if the reader invests thousands of dollars in highly specialized equipment, and even then the dishes often demand days of preparation, not to mention weeks, months or years of practice". However, a lot has changed since 2008. Specialized equipment that once cost "thousands of dollars" can now be purchased at the local hardware store or online for less than US$50, making the perfection of sous vide cooking accessible to home cooks worldwide.
