= Ad Hoc at Home =

2009 cookbook by Thomas Keller and Dave Cruz

- Authors: Thomas Keller and Dave Cruz
- Language: English
- Subject: Cookbook
- Published: November 6, 2009 (Artisan)
- Publication place: America
- Media type: Print
- Pages: 368
- Award: 2010 James Beard Foundation General Cooking award
- ISBN: 978-1579653774

Ad Hoc at Home: Family-Style Recipes is a 2009 cookbook written by American chef Thomas Keller with Dave Cruz. The cookbook presents over 250 recipes for home-style food. The cookbook won the 2010 James Beard Foundation Award for the best general cooking cookbook.

Thomas Keller took inspiration for Ad Hoc at Home from the last meal he cooked for his father before he died. The cookbook's recipes are based on food served at Keller's restaurant of the same name. and emphasize food served on share platters. The style of cuisine in Ad Hoc at Home is primarily American-style comfort food. The cookbook also contains various cooking techniques, denoted as "light bulb moments".

Paula Forbes of Eat Me Daily called Ad Hoc at Home's recipes "simple and elegant", but found that "they take considerably more time and skill than some cooks might want to expend on a simple family dinner". The Wall Street Journal described Ad Hoc at Home's recipes as "mostly homey staples... that are cooked with four-star-restaurant techniques", but noted that some of the recipes required expensive cooking equipment. Betty Hallock of the Los Angeles Times called it "by far the most approachable of Keller's cookbooks". Mark Manguerra of The Gastronomer's Bookshelf called the cookbook's recipes "fantastic weekend cooking at its easiest, and home food cooked restaurant-style at its most difficult".
