= Yountville shooting =

2018 murder-suicide in California, US

Yountville Veterans Home Shooting
- Location: 38.394087°N 122.364907°W; California Veterans' Home, Yountville, California, U.S.
- Date: March 9, 2018; 10:20 a.m. – 6:00 p.m. (PST)
- Attack type: Mass shooting, false imprisonment, mass murder, murder-suicide
- Weapons: .308 JR Enterprises LRP-07 semi-automatic rifle; 12-gauge Stoeger Coach Gun
- Deaths: 5 (including the perpetrator and an unborn child)
- Injuries: 0
- Perpetrator: Albert Wong

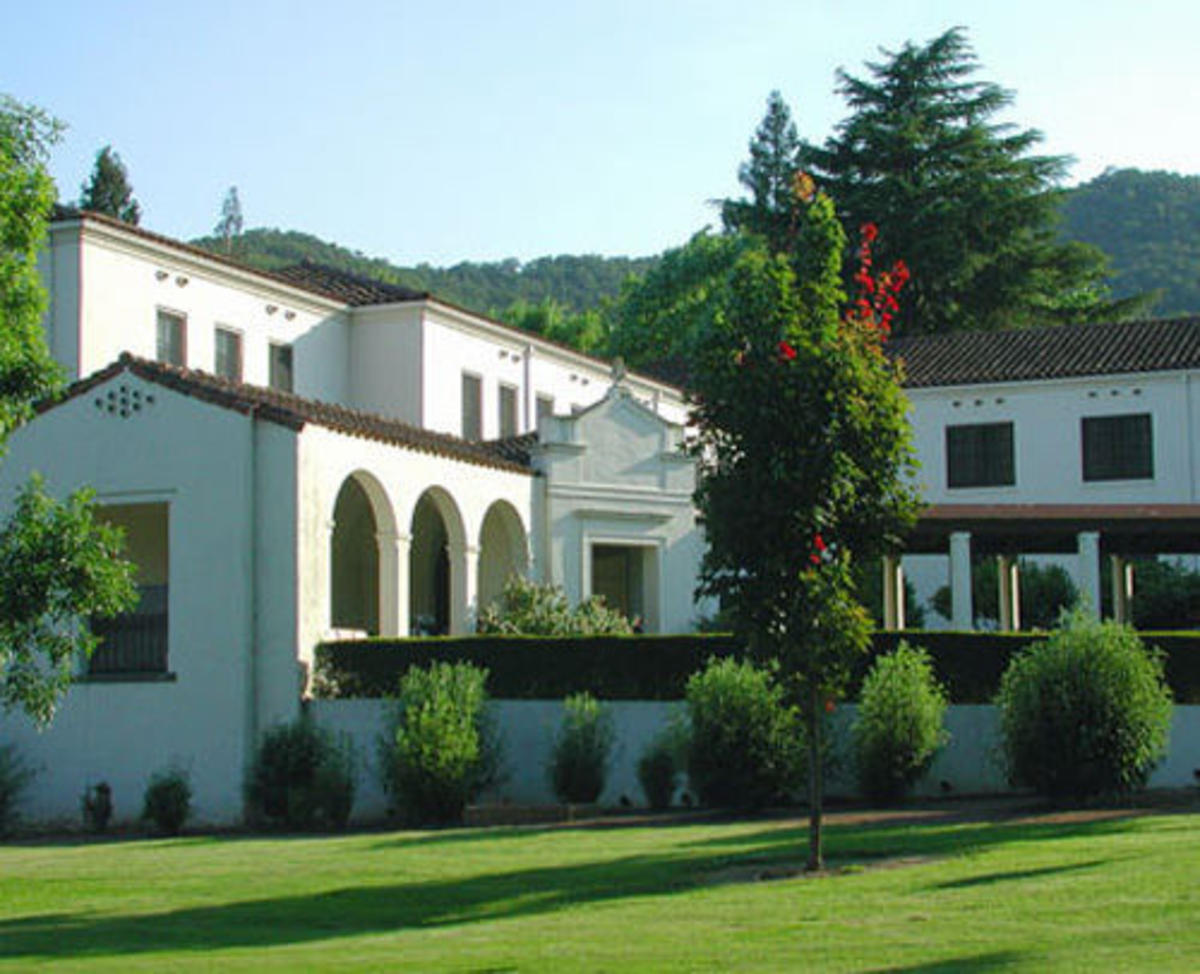
The Veterans Home of California, the site of the shooting

On March 9, 2018, a murder–suicide shooting took place at the Veterans Home of California in Yountville, California, United States. The Pathway Home is a residential treatment program meant to help post-9/11 veterans struggling with post-traumatic stress disorder and traumatic brain injury reintegrate into society. The shooter, Albert Wong, had attended the program until the home's executive director, Christine Loeber, dismissed him earlier in the week.

== Location ==
The Pathway Home was a treatment program run by a non-profit that leased part of a campus of the state-run Veterans Home of California-Yountville. The facility was secured by roaming unarmed 24-hour security personnel for the entire campus, with security cameras installed at The Pathway Home's front door, and hallways as well as a sign-in desk. The program worked to help veterans of the Iraq and Afghanistan wars with PTSD.

During the incident, residents of the nearby veterans' home were locked down after reports of an active shooter, and teenagers who were visiting the grounds were evacuated shortly after 2:30 pm.

== Incident ==
A stand-off started at around 10:30 am when a gunman, later identified as Albert Wong, a 36-year-old U.S. Army veteran of the War in Afghanistan, entered the facility during a going away party. The first 911 call of the incident was received around 10:20 am, and by 10:22 am the dispatcher had named Wong as the perpetrator and that he was armed with a semi-automatic weapon and large quantities of ammunition. Wong initially released veterans and other staff members, holding only Jennifer Gonzales Shushereba, a psychologist, Jennifer Golick and Christine Loeber, the clinical and executive directors of Pathway Home respectively.

Napa County deputies were some of the first to respond to the scene. At about 10 minutes after the initial 911 call Wong exchanged gunfire with Napa County Sheriff's Department Senior Deputy Steve Lombardi and then retreated into The Pathway Home building. After the shootout there was no further contact with Wong or any of the hostages, although three hostage-negotiation teams were on site. At around 6:00 pm, after negotiators from several agencies failed to contact him, California Highway Patrol officers entered the room and found everyone in it shot to death. His cell phone was later discovered in his parked car.

Wong was found dead of a self-inflicted shotgun wound in the second-floor room where he had killed the three female staffers. The Napa County Sheriff's Coroner determined that Shushereba was 26 weeks pregnant at the time of the incident and that her "unborn baby died due to lack of oxygenated blood caused by her mother's death." State Senator Bill Dodd reported that it was reasonable to believe that the three hostages were killed during or shortly after the initial exchange of gunfire with officers.

== Perpetrator ==
36-year old Albert Wong had been struggling to readjust to civilian life in California after returning from a tour of duty in Afghanistan in 2013. During his service Wong was awarded an Army Commendation Medal, an Army Good Conduct Medal, and campaign stars for fighting global terrorism and for marksmanship. He had held professional licenses as a security guard and security trainer, and a firearms permit through the Bureau of Security and Investigative Services from 2008.

He was a resident of The Pathway House for nearly a year of residential treatment for post-traumatic stress disorder (PTSD) until he was expelled for unspecified concerns about threatening behavior. A family member told reporters that Wong had reportedly told them that he was angry at staff members and wanted to get back at them after he had been found with knives at the facility and told to leave. Wong reported he "wanted to get back at them, talk to them, yell at them, not to kill them".

A family member of one of the victims, claimed "People were notified he was violent. Nothing was done. All the proper people were notified...the sheriffs department, the vets' health. Everybody knew."

== Aftermath ==
The Pathway Home is the subject of the 2014 documentary film, Of Men and War. After the shootings, The Pathway Home suspended operations indefinitely and its clients were placed with other programs. On August 31 its board members told reporters that the nonprofit planned to terminate the lease, as there was little belief they could effectively aid veterans in the location.

The Three Brave Women fund was established and been used to distribute monetary aid to the families of the victims.

== See also ==
- List of homicides in California
