= Per Se (restaurant) =

Restaurant in Manhattan, New York

Coordinates: 40.768735°N 73.982938°W

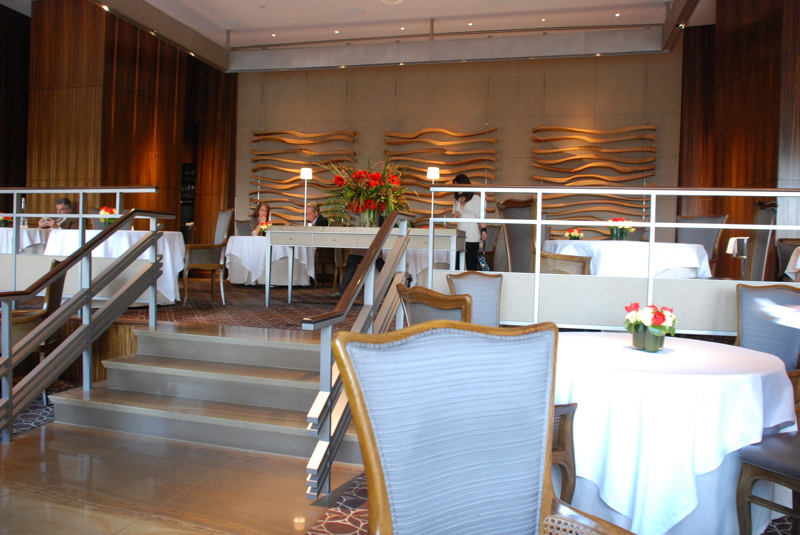
- The main dining room, February 2008
- Interactive map of Per Se

Restaurant information
- Established: February 2004; 22 years ago
- Owner: Thomas Keller
- Head chef: Thomas Keller
- Chef: Chad Palagi
- Food type: New American, French
- Dress code: Jackets required
- Rating: Michelin Guide: AAA Five Diamond Award (2013-2023); The New York Times: 2 out of 4 stars; The World's 50 Best Restaurants: 81st
- Location: The Shops at Columbus Circle, 4th floor of the Time Warner Center at 10 Columbus Circle, Manhattan, New York City, New York, 10019, United States
- Other information: $390 prix fixe
- Website: www.thomaskeller.com/perseny

Per Se is a New American and French restaurant at The Shops at Columbus Circle, on the fourth floor of the Deutsche Bank Center at 10 Columbus Circle in Manhattan, New York City. It is owned by chef Thomas Keller, and the chef de cuisine is Chad Palagi. Per Se has maintained three Michelin stars since the introduction of the New York City Guide in 2006.

== Development ==
Thomas Keller opened Per Se in February 2004. Keller also owns The French Laundry and Ad Hoc in Napa Valley; Bouchon in Napa Valley, Las Vegas, and Los Angeles; and Bouchon Bakery in Napa Valley. According to Keller's website, he is "the first and only American-born chef to hold multiple three-star ratings" by Michelin.

Keller chose restaurant/hotel designer Adam Tihany to draw together subtle references to The French Laundry and elements from both his and Keller's pasts; for example, the decorative blue door at the main entrance is modeled after the blue door at The French Laundry.

Per Se offers two nine-course tasting menus for $425, one vegetarian, and a four-course menu for $185. These menus are prix fixe, but guests may choose upgrades that may increase the menu price up to $800. According to Per Se, the wine list includes 2000 wines.

The restaurant has three dining rooms. The Salon is the entry to the other two rooms and serves the five-course menu in salon chairs and lower tables. The Main Dining Room serves the nine-course menus, and the West Room offers private dining. All rooms offer views of Columbus Circle, Central Park, and some Midtown and Upper East Side skyline.

== Ratings and reviews ==
It has been awarded five stars (highest rating) by the Forbes Travel Guide annually since 2005.

Per Se was awarded three stars ("Exceptional cuisine, worth a special journey") in the 2006 inaugural Michelin Guide to New York City, and has maintained that rating every year to date.

Since 2013, it has been the recipient of the AAA Five Diamond Award and the Wine Spectator Grand Award.

In 2011, it was called the best restaurant in New York City by critic Sam Sifton of The New York Times in a four-star review. This rating was downgraded to two stars by Sifton's successor, Pete Wells, in 2016. Explaining this change in the updated review, he wrote, "With each fresh review, a restaurant has to earn its stars again. In its current form and at its current price, Per Se struggled and failed to do this, ranging from respectably dull at best to disappointingly flat-footed at worst."

It was listed second in the La Liste Top Ten, and was recognized by L'Art et Manière for Outstanding Service in 2016.

As of 2017, Zagat gives Per Se a rating of 4.6/5 for food, putting it in their top 50 restaurants of New York City.

== See also ==
- List of New American restaurants
- List of Michelin 3-star restaurants in the United States
- List of Michelin-starred restaurants in New York City
