= Sally Schmitt =

American restaurateur (c. 1931–2022)

- Born: Sarah Elizabeth Kelsoe; February 28, 1932; Roseville, California, U.S.
- Died: March 5, 2022 (aged 90)
- Occupations: Restaurateur, chef
- Known for: Co-founder of The French Laundry, farm-to-table movement pioneer
- Spouse: Donald Schmitt (m. 1953–2017)
- Children: 5, including Karen Bates

Sally Schmitt (February 28, 1932 – March 5, 2022) was an American restaurateur who helped launch California's farm to table movement. She was the original chef and co-founder of The French Laundry.

== Biography ==
Sally Schmitt was born Sarah Elizabeth Kelsoe in Roseville, California. She grew up on a farm and initially learned to cook from her mother. Sally studied Home Economics at the University of California, Davis and graduated from the University of California, Berkeley in 1952. The following year she married banker Donald Schmitt. Together the couple had five children. The couple relocated to Yountville, California in 1967, where Don managed the Vintage 1870 shopping center (today V Marketplace).

While Don managed the shopping center, Sally took charge of the Vintage Cafe, a burger joint with soda fountain and Napa Valley's first and only espresso machine. Within three years, she had opened The Chutney Kitchen restaurant in a vacant corner of Vintage 1870, designing her own kitchen to use for the restaurant and for making chutney to sell to her customers.

The Schmitts opened the French Laundry restaurant on February 7, 1978. The restaurant served one prix fixe dinner a night, and every day there was a different menu: a choice of three starters, a soup, an entree, a green salad with cheese and a choice of three desserts. Both the food and wine were locally sourced. The menu featured rustic French fare. Former San Francisco Chronicle critic Michael Bauer called Sally "a true pioneer" not only for being a female chef in a male-dominated sphere, but also for offering an all-California wine list. The tables were booked months in advance. The restaurant was so popular that even culinary luminaries such as Julia Child and Jeremiah Tower had to pull strings to get a table.

The couple sold the restaurant to chef Thomas Keller in 1994. Keller kept the name of Schmitt's restaurant and continued Sally's tradition of inviting guests into the kitchen after a meal. He also pays tribute to her annually by serving one of her prix fixe menus. Keller also marks The French Laundry's birthday on February 9 — the day the Schmitts first opened its doors to the public, not the day he opened his iteration of the establishment.

The Schmitts later helped operate the Apple Farm in Philo, California with their daughter Karen Bates. Grandson Perry Hoffman also worked at Apple Farm and is now a Michelin starred chef.

Don Schmitt died in 2017. Sally Schmitt died on March 5, 2022, at the age of 90. Her cookbook, Six California Kitchens, was released posthumously in April 2022.
