= The Great American Recipe =

Cooking competition PBS show

- Genre: Cooking show
- Directed by: José Manuel Rodriguez Bermejo
- Presented by: Alejandra Ramos
- Country of origin: United States
- Original language: English
- No. of seasons: 4
- No. of episodes: 30

Production
- Executive producers: Steve Humble; Alyssa Hastrich; Rachel Knobelman; Jilly Pearce; Ernie Manouse; Valerie W. Chew; Layla Smith; Donna MacLetchie
- Producer: Sev DeMyers
- Cinematography: Carlos F. Gonzalez; Steve Lopez
- Running time: 52–54 minutes
- Production companies: VPM; Objective Media Group America; All3Media America

Original release
- Network: PBS
- Release: June 24, 2022 – present

The Great American Recipe is an American cooking competition television series that airs on PBS. Each season, home cooks from across the United States showcase America's diverse cuisine and compete to have one of their dishes named the "Great American Recipe." Following the first season, subsequent seasons used a no-elimination format to allow each contestant more time to share their story and hone their culinary skills.

== Seasons ==
=== Season 1 ===
The first season was filmed in Caroline County, Virginia. The judges were Tiffany Derry, Graham Elliot, and Leah Cohen, with Alejandra Ramos hosting.

The first winner of The Great American Recipe was Silvia Martinez, a blogger in San Luis Obispo, California. The companion cookbook, The Great American Recipe Cookbook, features her recipe for chiles en nogada on the cover.

=== Season 2 ===
The second season was again judged by Derry, Elliot, and Cohen, with Ramos returning as host. Filming for the first seven episodes returned to Caroline County, then moved to Montgomery County, Texas, for the finale.

Beginning in Season 2, contestants stayed on from week to week until the end of the penultimate episode, when the three top-performing cooks were chosen to advance to the final.

The winner of Season 2 was Brad Mahlof, a real estate developer in New York City. The Great American Recipe Cookbook: Season Two Edition features his recipe for mafrum and salatim on the cover.

=== Season 3 ===
In Season 3, filming took place in Nashville, Tennessee, with Timothy Hollingsworth and Francis Lam replacing Graham Elliot and Leah Cohen. Season 1's winner, Silvia, returned as a guest judge in the final episode.

Recipes were still posted to the PBS website, but no further editions of the cookbook were published.

The winner of Season 3 was Adjo Honsou, a former biotech scientist and food truck owner in St. Louis, Missouri.

=== Season 4 ===
Derry, Hollingsworth, Lam, and Ramos returned to Nashville for a six-episode Season 4 with eight home cooks.
