= Napa Valley Museum =

- Established: 1972; 54 years ago
- Location: 55 Presidents Circle; Yountville, California, United States
- Coordinates: 38.3949°N 122.3652°W
- Type: Art and history museum
- Accreditation: NEA Blue Star Museum; North American Reciprocal Museum Association
- Visitors: 12,000 (2012)
- Executive director: Laura Rafaty
- Operations director: Christine Lilienthal
- President: Janet Gentile Herrero
- Curator: Kathleen Stewart
- Architects: Fernau and Hartmann
- Public transit access: VINE Transit Route 10
- Parking: On site (no charge)
- Website: napavalleymuseum.org

The Napa Valley Museum is a museum in Yountville, California. It was founded in 1972 by individuals concerned with preserving Vintage Hall in St. Helena. In 1998 the museum moved from St. Helena to Yountville, located between St. Helena and Napa.

The museum features exhibits on the history, culture, environment of Napa Valley as well as the creative expressions of regional and local artists.

Warrior Dogs, an exhibit honoring the service and sacrifice of American military and working dogs takes place in 2024. It includes information about the selection and training of puppies “born to be brave.”

In 2021 the museum mounted an exhibition titled Dangerous Games: Dangerous Toys We Loved As Kids. The show included science kits containing radioactive materials, darts, and toys made from glass. Also in 2021, the museum presented the show, Kitchen Gizmos & Gadgets from the Kathleen Hill Culinary Collection. The show displayed "bizarre and noteworthy foodie apparatuses" as well as utensils and historical kitchen tools.
