= The Surf Club Restaurant =

Restaurant in Miami, Florida, U.S.

Restaurant information
- Head chef: Thomas Keller
- Food type: American
- Rating: (Michelin Guide)
- Location: 9011 Collins Ave., Surfside, Florida, 33154, United States
- Website: surfclubrestaurant.com

The Surf Club Restaurant is a Michelin-starred restaurant serving American cuisine in Miami, Florida. The restaurant operates within the Four Seasons at the Surf Club in Northern Miami.

== See also ==
- List of Michelin-starred restaurants in Florida
