= Masa's Wine Bar & Kitchen =

Michelin Star French Restaurant in the Heart of San Francisco (Closed 2013)

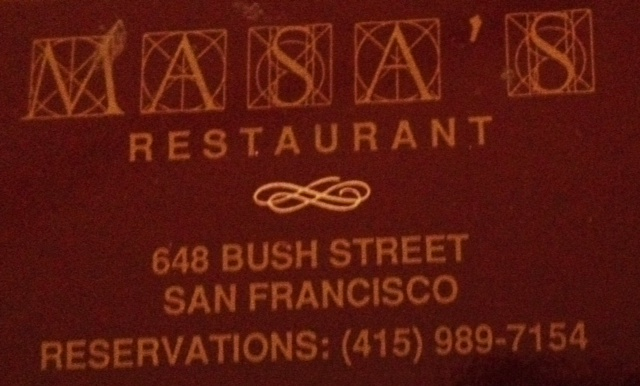
- Masa's Restaurant matchbook circa 1994
- Interactive map of Masa's Wine Bar & Kitchen

Restaurant information
- Established: 1983
- Closed: 2013
- Food type: Nouvelle French
- Rating: (Michelin Guide)
- Location: 648 Bush Street, San Francisco, California, 94108, United States
- Coordinates: 37.79042°N 122.40805°W
- Reservations: Accepted
- Other information: Phone: 415-989-7154
- Website: www.masasrestaurant.com

Masa's Wine Bar & Kitchen (also known as Masa's Restaurant or Masa's) was a new French restaurant located in San Francisco, California, in the United States.

== Background ==
Masa's was opened in July 1983 by chef Masataka Kobayashi. The restaurant uses Masataka's nickname, Masa, for its title. Upon its opening, the restaurant had a six-month waiting list for reservations. Kobayashi was murdered in 1984, and sous-chef Bill Galloway ran the kitchen until Julian Serrano became executive chef. He was chef for 14 years. Ron Siegel then became executive chef, followed by Richard Reddington. In 2004, Gregory Short became executive chef. Alan Murray was master sommelier. Short left Masa's on February 16, 2013, and the restaurant closed, with intentions to re-open. The restaurant is currently a sports bar.

== Cuisine ==
Masa's original concept mixed French cuisine with nouvelle cuisine. Upon his death, sous-chef Bill Galloway took over the kitchen temporarily. The food became less sauce-focused and "lighter," as it was described in the San Francisco Chronicle in 1985. Galloway started working with different food distributors, improving the quality of the seafood, and hired a larger dessert staff.

The restaurant had food-focused theme dinners. In February 2013, the restaurant had a five-course prix fixe citrus-themed dinner to celebrate the citrus harvest season.

== See also ==
- List of French restaurants
