= The French Laundry Cookbook =

Book by Thomas Keller

- Cover of The French Laundry Cookbook
- Authors: Thomas Keller, Michael Ruhlman and Susie Heller
- Illustrator: Deborah Jones
- Language: English
- Subject: Cookbook
- Publisher: Artisan
- Publication date: 1 November 1999
- Publication place: New York
- Media type: Print
- Pages: 336
- Award: 2000 IACP Cookbook of the Year
- ISBN: 978-1579651268

The French Laundry Cookbook is a 1999 cookbook written by the American chefs Thomas Keller, Michael Ruhlman, and Susie Heller; illustrated by Deborah Jones. The book features recipes from Keller's restaurant The French Laundry. It won the 2000 International Association of Culinary Professionals (IACP) Cookbook of the Year award, as well as the IACP's best designed cookbook and best first cookbook awards. The French Laundry Cookbook is in its fifty-second printing and has been printed over 400,000 times.

The French Laundry Cookbook contains 150 recipes divided into six sections, each representing a course of a meal. The cookbook also includes cooking and food preparation techniques.

The Wall Street Journal called the cookbook "notorious for including some of the most laborious recipes in print", commenting that "putting the ingredients together on a plate properly can be an architectural challenge". Restaurants & Institutions called the cookbook "too esoteric for home cooks" but found that it "does inspire, teach and set standards for any chef". Grant Achatz of Alinea has called it "[t]he ultimate reference for cooks [who wish] to be inspired by the pursuit of perfection". The cookbook has also been cited as an inspiration by David Chang of Momofuku and Éric Ripert of Le Bernardin.

The French Laundry Cookbook was bundled with another of Keller's cookbooks, Bouchon, in a book called The Complete Thomas Keller.
