= The French Laundry =

French restaurant in Yountville, California, US

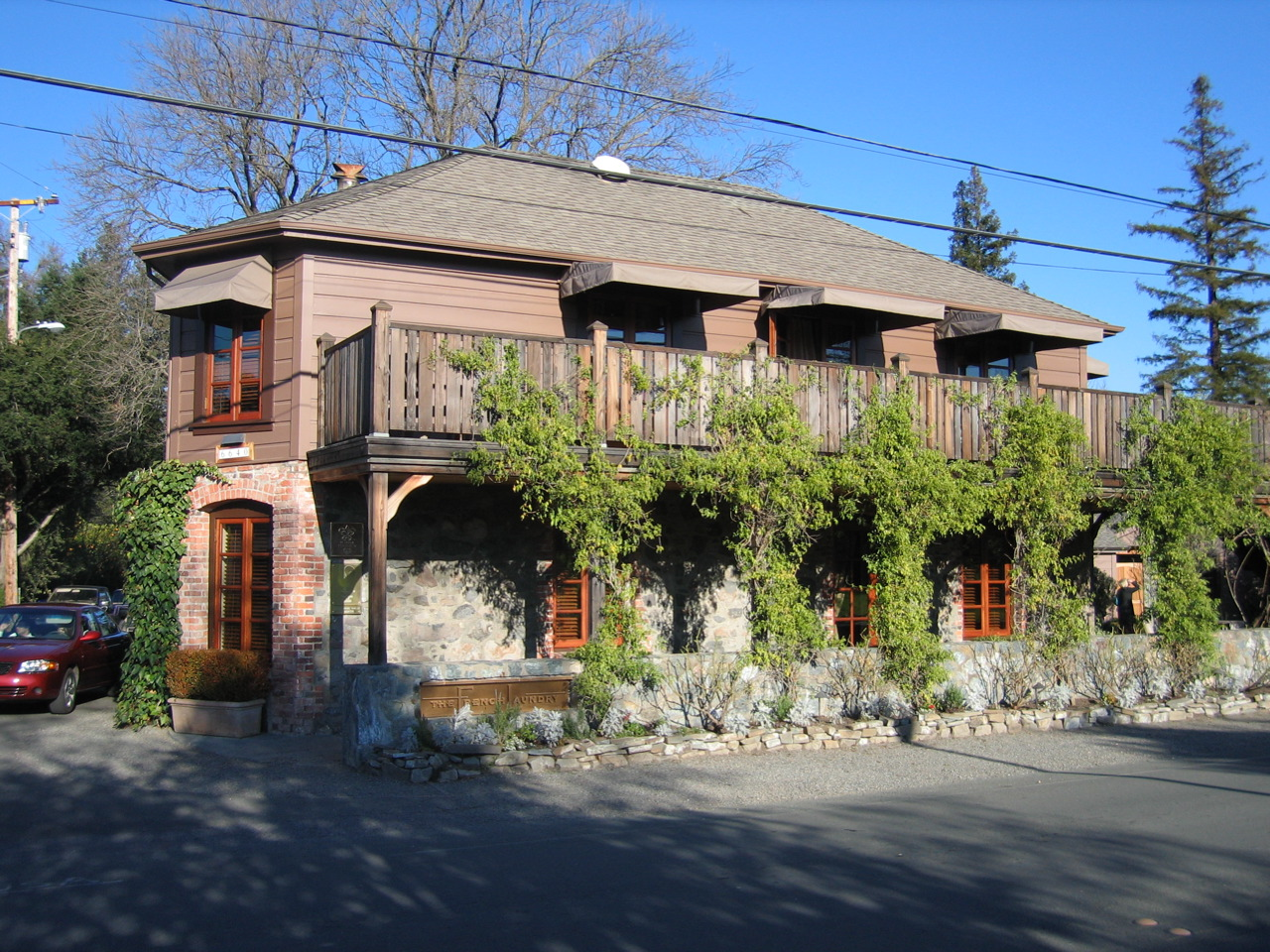
- Exterior of The French Laundry
- Interactive map of The French Laundry

Restaurant information
- Established: February 14, 1978; 48 years ago
- Owner: Thomas Keller
- Head chef: Thomas Keller
- Chef: Ara Jo
- Pastry chef: Jamie Houghton
- Food type: French with Californian cuisine influences
- Dress code: None
- Rating: (Michelin Guide); *AAA Five Diamond Award (2005— ) *Forbes Five Star Award (1999— )
- Location: 6640 Washington St, Yountville, California, 94599, United States
- Coordinates: 38°24′16″N 122°21′54″W
- Seating capacity: 60
- Website: www.thomaskeller.com/tfl
- French Laundry
- U.S. National Register of Historic Places
- Location within California Location within the United States
- Location: 6640 Washington St., Yountville, California
- Coordinates: 38°24′16″N 122°21′50″W
- Area: 0.4 acres (0.16 ha; 17,000 ft^{2}; 1,600 m^{2})
- Built: 1900
- Architects: Clark, Alexander (Gus)
- NRHP reference No.: 78000728
- Added to NRHP: April 19, 1978 (48 years ago)

The French Laundry is a three-Michelin star French and Californian cuisine restaurant located in Yountville, California, in Napa Valley. Sally Schmitt opened The French Laundry on February 14, 1978, and designed her menus around local, seasonal ingredients; she was a visionary chef and pioneer of California cuisine. Since 1994, the chef and owner of The French Laundry is Thomas Keller. The restaurant building dates from 1900 and was added to the National Register of Historic Places in 1978.

== History ==
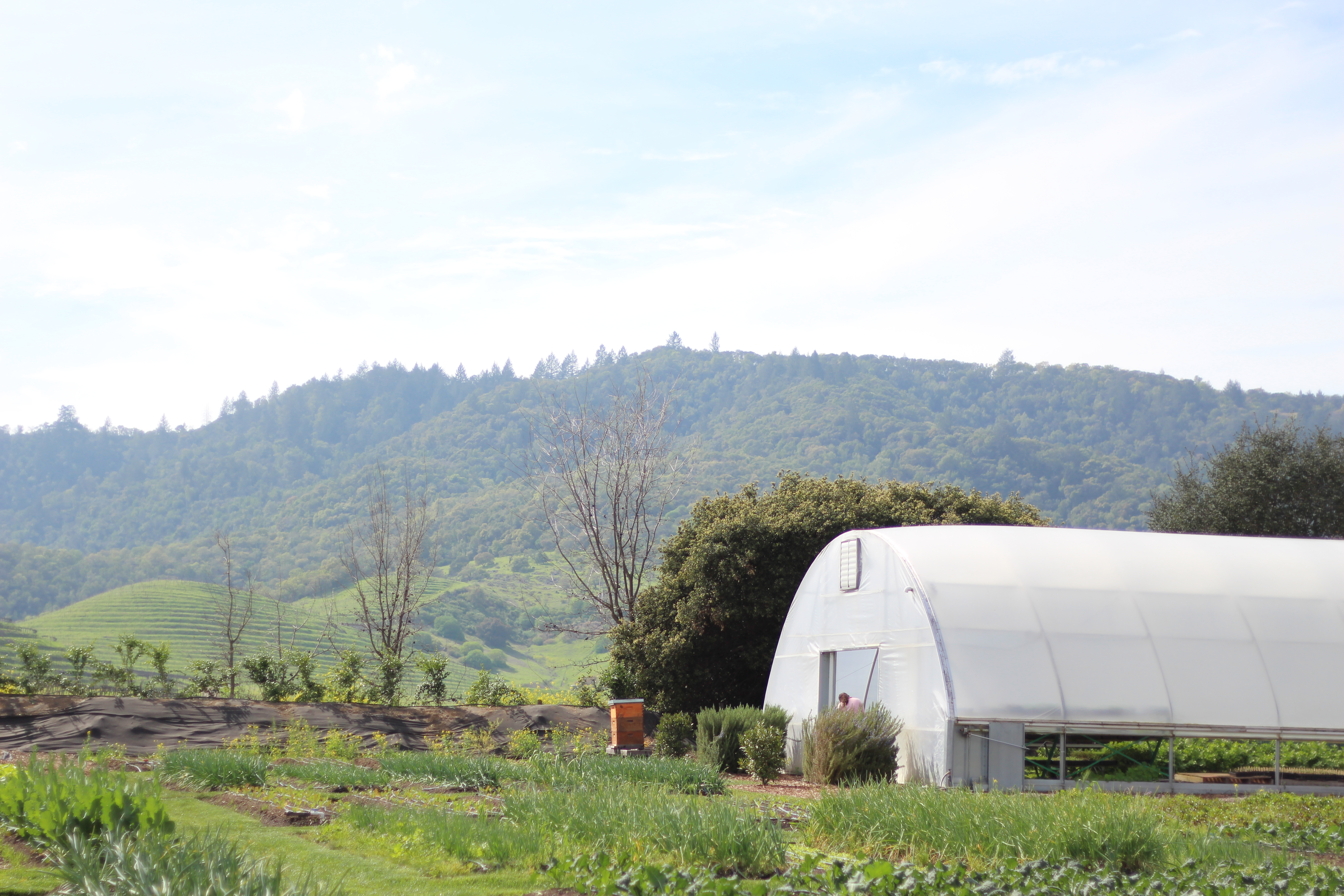
French Laundry Restaurant Greenhouse

The building was constructed as a saloon in 1896 by a Scottish stonesman for Pierre Guillaume. A 1906 law outlawed the sale and consumption of alcohol in the area around the Veterans Home of California Yountville, and the building was bought in 1920 by John Lande who used it as a French steam laundry, which is the origin of the restaurant's name.

In 1978, Sally Schmitt and her husband Don, a former bank appraiser and then-mayor of Yountville, purchased the building and renovated it into a restaurant. They kept the name, the French Laundry, because locals still referred to the building as such. The French Laundry was one of the first restaurants to offer what would become known as California cuisine. The Schmitts ran the restaurant for 17 years before selling it to Thomas Keller in 1994.

In 1999, Keller published The French Laundry Cookbook, which he considers his definitive book on cuisine. That year it won three International Association of Culinary Professionals (IACP) awards for Cookbook of the Year, Julia Child "First Cookbook" Award, and Design Award.

In July 2014, the Napa Valley restaurant celebrated its 20th anniversary with a six-hour feast for friends, locals, and luminaries and temporarily closed for renovations before the end of the year.

In December 2014, while being temporarily closed for renovations, The French Laundry wine cellar was robbed of an estimated $500,000 of wine. Most of the wine was subsequently recovered.

On April 7, 2015, the restaurant reopened following demolition of a number of buildings on the site. During the remainder of the renovation project, the staff worked out of a temporary kitchen.

During the COVID-19 pandemic, The French Laundry closed and re-opened several times, and faced restrictions such as limited seating. In November 2020, Governor Gavin Newsom attended a birthday dinner at The French Laundry, drawing criticism for violating the state's gathering guidance intended to slow the spread of COVID-19. The incident became a focal point in the 2021 California gubernatorial recall election and made the restaurant's name a shorthand for criticism of Newsom.

=== Controversies ===
In 2026, Keller staunchly opposed the construction of a 120-unit apartment building several blocks from The French Laundry, intended for workers in Yountville who had been priced out of the expensive housing in town. Keller argued that workers neither wanted nor needed the housing.

At least three lawsuits were filed against the restaurant's ownership group in 2026 by more than 50 former employees, led by a former dishwasher and a server, alleging they were "required to work off the clock, (and) work through meal and rest periods." Remarking on the situation in an opinion published by Inc., Soren Kaplan, a corporate culture consultant, wrote: "The lawsuits highlight a pattern that shows up across industries: organizations investing heavily in the experience they show customers while under-investing in the conditions workers operate in to deliver it. When those two diverge far enough, the gap surfaces, and when it does, the brand absorbs the damage."

== Cuisine ==
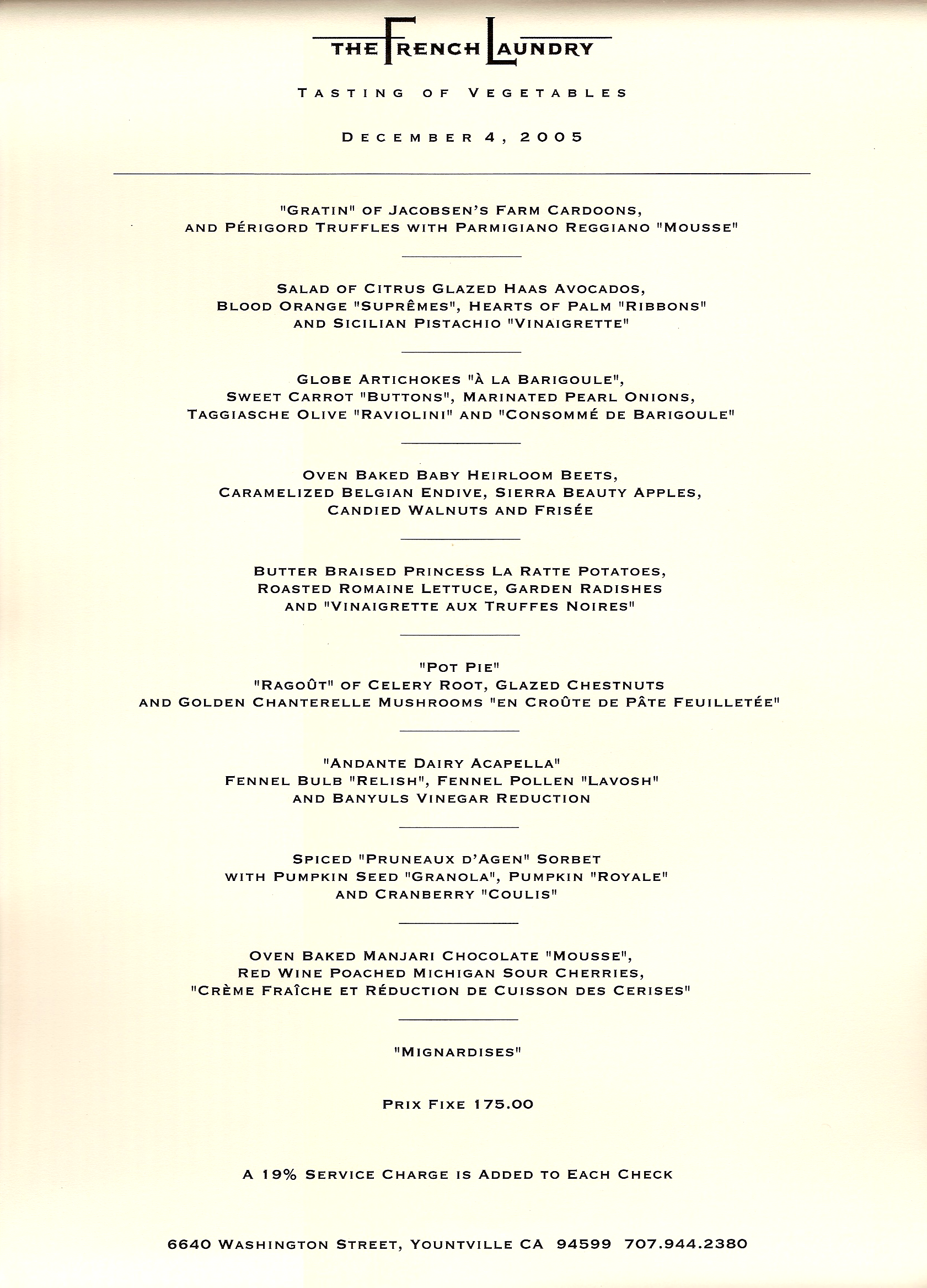
This vegetable tasting menu was one of three menus available for Sunday December 4, 2005

Every day, The French Laundry serves two different nine-course tasting menus: the Chef's Tasting Menu and the vegetarian Tasting of Vegetables. Each menu is US$425 per person (including gratuity) for the base meal, although not including additional supplements such as caviar and truffles. During the winter holiday season, Thanksgiving, Halloween, and other holidays, the restaurant may offer special dishes.

The food is mainly French with contemporary American influences—for example, specialties such as smoked salmon cornets, which were inspired by a trip to Baskin-Robbins.

== Staff ==
Notable alumni of The French Laundry's kitchen staff have included Grant Achatz of Alinea, Eric Ziebold of Kinship and Métier, Corey Lee of Benu, Jonathan Benno of Lincoln Ristorante, René Redzepi of Noma in Copenhagen, Ron Siegel of Madcap, and Duff Goldman of Charm City Cakes. Previous Chef de Cuisine Timothy Hollingsworth won the Bocuse d'Or USA semi-finals in 2008, and represented the U.S. in the international finals in January 2009, placing sixth.

== Other locations ==
In February 2004 in Manhattan, New York City, Thomas Keller opened Per Se, an East Coast version of his Yountville restaurant. It has also received three Michelin stars. The kitchens of both restaurants are connected via a real-time video feed on a television screen.

Thomas Keller opened Ad Lib, a pop-up restaurant in the Silverado Resort and Spa during the renovation of The French Laundry. The restaurant serves American classics. This is not the first pop-up restaurant that Keller has helmed. Previous iterations occurred at the Mandarin Oriental in Hong Kong and at Harrods in London.

== Reception ==
Since 2006, it has been awarded three stars in the Michelin Guide to San Francisco. It received a favorable review in The New York Times and was called "the best restaurant in the world, period" in 2005 by restaurateur and celebrity chef Anthony Bourdain.

Since 2007, the restaurant has been the recipient of the Wine Spectator Grand Award.

== See also ==
- List of Michelin 3-star restaurants
- List of Michelin 3-star restaurants in the United States
