= Ann Hood =

American novelist (born 1956)

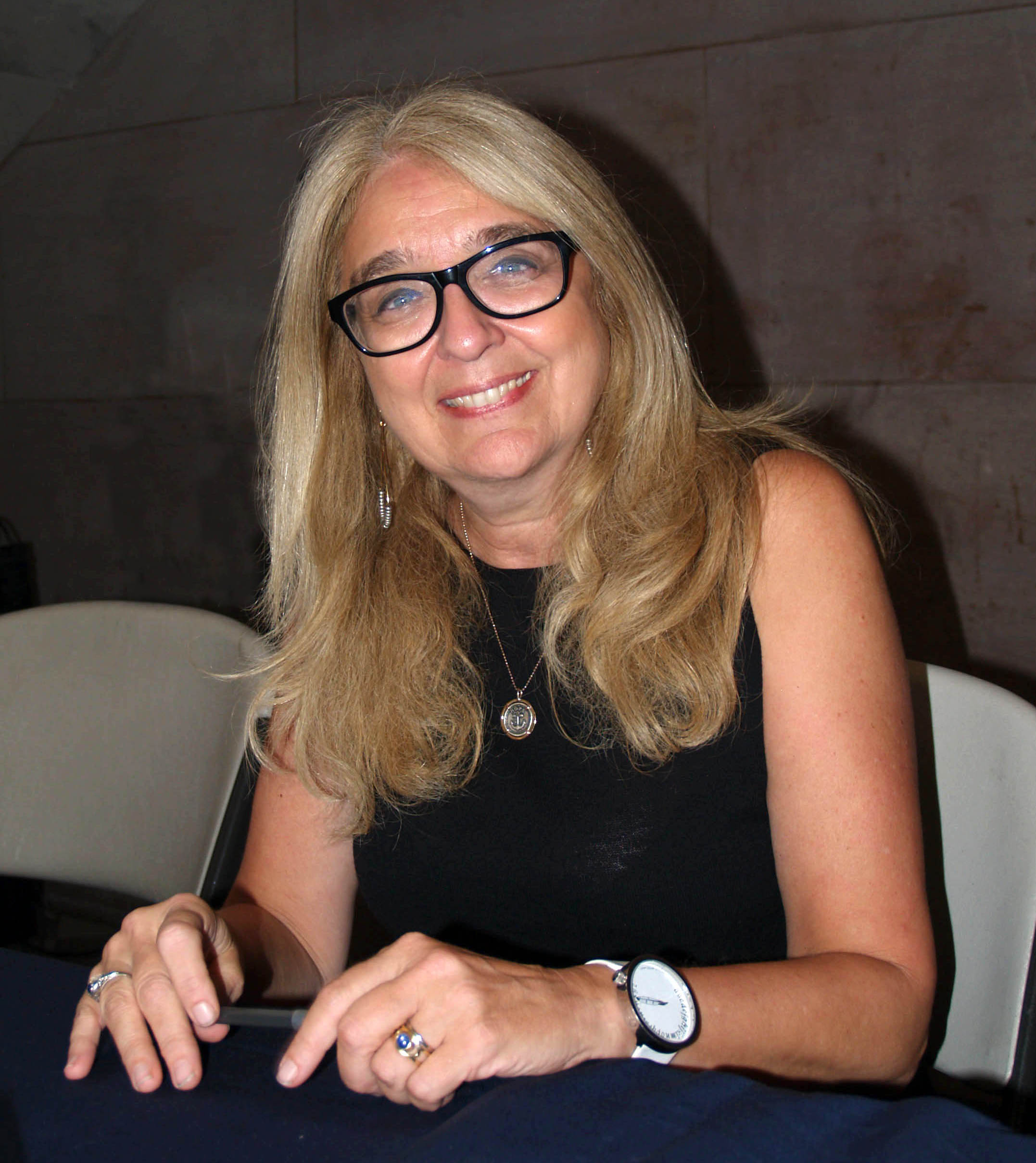
- Hood at the 2014 Brooklyn Book Festival
- Born: December 9, 1956 (age 69); West Warwick, Rhode Island, U.S.
- Education: University of Rhode Island (BA); New York University
- Occupations: Novelist; short-story writer; memoirist
- Spouse: Michael Ruhlman (m. 2017)
- Children: 2 (Note: One biological child and one adopted child.)
- Writing career
- Period: 1987–present
- Notable works: Somewhere Off The Coast Of Maine (1987) The Knitting Circle (2005); The Red Thread (2010); Comfort: A Journey Through Grief (2008) "The Book That Matters Most" (2016)
- Website: Official website

Ann Hood (born December 9, 1956) is an American novelist and short story writer; she has also written nonfiction. She is the author of fourteen novels, four memoirs, a short story collection, a ten-book series for middle readers and one young adult novel. Her essays and short stories have appeared in many journals, magazines, and anthologies, including The Paris Review, Ploughshares, and Tin House. Hood is a regular contributor to The New York Times' Op-Ed page, Home Economics column. Her most recent work is "Fly Girl: A Memoir," published with W.W. Norton and Company in 2022.

She is a faculty member in the MFA in Creative Writing program at The New School in New York City. Hood was born in West Warwick, Rhode Island. She now lives with her husband Michael Ruhlman and their children.

== Early life ==
After Hood earned her BA in English from the University of Rhode Island, she worked for the now-defunct airline TWA as a flight attendant, living in Boston and Saint Louis and later moving to New York City. She attended graduate school at New York University, studying American Literature.

Hood began writing her first novel Somewhere Off The Coast Of Maine in 1983 while working as a flight attendant — and while attending graduate school —writing whenever she could during train rides to JFK airport or in the galleys of the airplane while passengers slept. During a furlough from the airline, she worked at the Spring Street Bookstore in Soho and Tony Roma's while writing Somewhere Off The Coast Of Maine. Like much of her work, Somewhere Off The Coast Of Maine draws upon her own life. Hood says the book began as a series of short stories about three women who went to college together in the 1960s. A year earlier, her older brother, Skip, died in a freak accident and Hood was struggling with how to cope with the loss. At a writer’s conference, Hood was convinced by the writer Nicholas Delbanco that she was really writing a novel, and from there she began to connect the stories.

In 1987 the novel was published by Bantam Books as one of the launch books for their original paperback series, Bantam New Fiction.

Hood’s flight attendant career ended in 1986 when TWA went on strike and the flight attendants found themselves soon “replaced.” With more time to devote to writing, her stories and essays began to appear in Mademoiselle, Redbook, Story, Self, Glamour, New Woman, among others.

== Career ==
=== Short stories ===
Hood’s short story "Total Cave Darkness," about an alcoholic woman who runs away with a Protestant minister nine years younger than she is, appeared in The Paris Review in 2000. It is also the opening story in her collection of stories An Ornithologist's Guide To Life. The title story appeared in Glimmer Train in 2004 about a young girl who slowly discovers her mother is having an affair with their neighbor. Her stories have also appeared in Tin House, Ploughshares, Good Housekeeping, Story, Five Points, and others.

=== Novels ===
Hood is the best-selling author of fourteen novels, including The Obituary Writer, in which she explores the theme of grief and "the remedies that can ease, if never entirely banish" it, and in which she explores gender roles and complications of romantic love. A previous novel, The Knitting Circle, also explored the theme of grief. Her most recent book is The Book That Matters Most which was published in 2016.

=== Non-fiction ===
Hood’s best-selling memoir Comfort: A Journey Through Grief (W. W. Norton & Company, 2008), chronicling the death of her five-year-old daughter Grace and her subsequent search for healing, was named one of the top ten non-fiction books of 2008 by Entertainment Weekly and was a New York Times Editor's Choice.

Do Not Go Gentle: My Search For Miracles in a Cynical Time (Picador, 1999) follows Hood’s travels to Chimayo, New Mexico in search of a miracle cure for her father’s lung cancer. The dirt at El Santuario de Chimayo, a Roman Catholic church, is believed to have healing properties and thousands flock to the site each year. Her father’s tumor did disappear, but he later died from complications from chemotherapy. Hood initially wrote about this experience in an essay for Doubletake magazine. That essay went on to win a Pushcart Prize. Hood’s editor at Picador urged her to turn it into a book.

She is the editor of the anthology Knitting Yarns: Writers on Knitting (W. W. Norton & Company, 2013), in which her essay "Ten Things I Learned From Knitting" appears as well as its sequel "Knitting Pearls: Writers Writing About Knitting".

=== Teaching ===
Hood is a faculty member in the MFA in Creative Writing program at The New School in New York City. She also teaches at New York University. Hood has also taught at the Eckerd College Writers’ Conference, The Maui Writers’ Conference, and The Bread Loaf Writers’ Conference.

== Awards ==
She is the recipient of the Paul Bowles Prize for Short Fiction, two Pushcart Prizes, and a Best American Spiritual Writing Award.

== Personal life ==
Hood lives in Providence, Rhode Island. She has two children, daughter Annabelle and son Sam, both with former husband Lorne Adrain. Annabelle is adopted. She is currently married to writer Michael Ruhlman.

On April 18, 2002, Hood's five-year-old daughter, Grace, died from a virulent form of strep. For two years Hood found herself unable to write or even read. She took solace in learning to knit and in knitting groups. She gradually made her way back to her craft, writing short essays about Grace and grief. To make sense of her own grief, in late 2004 Hood began to write her novel The Knitting Circle, about a woman whose five-year-old daughter dies from meningitis. The woman joins a knitting group of others also struggling to heal from loss. Hood’s best-selling memoir Comfort: A Journey Through Grief chronicles her own struggle after her daughter’s sudden death.

== Selected works ==
Novels

- Somewhere Off the Coast of Maine. New York: Bantam, 1987. ISBN 0-553-34382-3
- Waiting to Vanish. New York: Bantam, 1988. ISBN 978-0-553-34521-6
- Three-Legged Horse. New York: Bantam, 1989. ISBN 978-0-553-34732-6
- Something Blue. New York: Bantam, 1991. ISBN 978-0-553-07140-5
- Places to Stay the Night. New York: Doubleday, 1993. ISBN 978-0-385-42556-8
- The Properties of Water. New York: Doubleday, 1995. ISBN 978-0-385-47279-1
- Ruby. New York: Picador, 1998. ISBN 978-0-312-19553-3
- The Knitting Circle. New York: W. W. Norton, 2007. ISBN 0-393-05901-4
- The Red Thread. New York: W. W. Norton, 2010. ISBN 978-0-393-07020-0
- The Obituary Writer. New York: W. W. Norton, 2013. ISBN 978-0-393-08142-8
- An Italian Wife. New York: W. W. Norton, 2014. ISBN 978-0-393-24166-2
- The Book That Matters Most. New York: W. W. Norton, 2016. ISBN 978-0-393-24165-5

Young-adult novel

- How I Saved My Father's Life (And Ruined Everything Else). New York: Scholastic Press, 2008. ISBN 978-0-439-92819-9
- She Loves You (Yeah, Yeah, Yeah). Penguin Workshop, 2018.

Short story collection

- An Ornithologist's Guide to Life: Stories. New York: W. W. Norton, 2004. ISBN 978-0-393-05900-7

Nonfiction

- Creating Character Emotions. New York: Story Press, 1998. ISBN 978-1-884910-33-3 (textbook)
- Do Not Go Gentle: My Search for Miracles in a Cynical Time. New York: Picador, 2000. ISBN 978-0-312-24259-6 (memoir)
- Comfort: A Journey Through Grief. New York: W. W. Norton, 2008. ISBN 978-0-393-06456-8 (memoir)
- Knitting Yarns: Writers on Knitting. New York: W. W. Norton, 2013. (essay, anthology)
- Knitting Pearls: Writers Writing About Knitting. New York: W. W. Norton, 2015. (essay, anthology)
- Morningstar. New York W.W. Norton, 2017. ISBN 978-0393254815 (memoir)
- Kitchen Yarns: Notes on Life, Love, and Food. New York W.W. Norton, 2018. ISBN 9780393249507 (memoir)
