= Of Men and War =

- Film poster
- Directed by: Laurent Bécue-Renard
- Written by: Laurent Bécue-Renard
- Produced by: Laurent Bécue-Renard; Isidore Bethel; Heinz Dill; Elisabeth Garbar; Thierry Garrel
- Cinematography: Camille Cottagnoud
- Edited by: Isidore Bethel; Charlotte Boigeol; Sophie Brunet
- Music by: Kudsi Erguner
- Production companies: Alice Films; Télévision Suisse Romande
- Distributed by: Why Not Productions; Alice Films
- Release dates: 21 May 2014 (Cannes); 22 October 2014 (France)
- Running time: 142 minutes
- Countries: France; Switzerland
- Language: English

Of Men and War (French: Des hommes et de la guerre) is a 2014 documentary film by Laurent Bécue-Renard. It explores the psychological legacy of war on a group of American veterans returning from conflicts in Iraq and Afghanistan. The men are undergoing trauma therapy at The Pathway Home, a residential treatment program on the grounds of the Veterans Home in Yountville, CA until 2018. Over the course of five years, they participate in group therapy and one-on-one sessions and gradually transform their trauma into narratives of survival before returning home to their wives, children, and parents. The film premiered in the Special Screenings section at the 2014 Cannes Film Festival. The film won the VPRO IDFA Award for Best Feature-Length Documentary at the 2014 International Documentary Film Festival Amsterdam. It received a European Film Award for Best Documentary nomination at the 27th European Film Awards and screened at the Museum of Modern Art's Documentary Fortnight.

The Pathway Home suspended its operations indefinitely and placed its patients in other programs after a gunman killed three staff members in a 2018 murder-suicide.

== Production ==
The film was a coproduction between Alice Films in France and Louise Productions in Switzerland. The film had three editors, who worked on the film for years: Isidore Bethel (also associate producer), Sophie Brunet, and Charlotte Boigeol. It exists in four versions: the original 142-minute festival and French theatrical cut, a 96-minute cut for Kino Lorber's United States release of the film, a 90-minute version for POV's US broadcast of the film, and a 102-minute cut for its French broadcast on France 2.

== Reception ==
Upon its world premiere, Of Men and War received glowing industry praise. The Hollywood Reporter called it "a rather unforgettable experience" and Variety wrote that "Laurent Becue-Renard's rigorous war-trauma documentary provides vital testimony." The film won the Cinematic Nonfiction Grand Jury Prize at the Little Rock Film Festival and Special Recognition at the San Francisco International Film Festival, where the jury noted "Of Men and War makes us understand the horrors of war without ever showing us a single frame of battle, offering access to interior psychologies most viewers have never seen before in a tightly structured, beautifully edited, minimalist piece of nonfiction." From there, it had theatrical releases in France and the United States and received overwhelming critical praise, including a score of 100% on Rotten Tomatoes. The film is a New York Times Critic's Pick.
