= Cooking Under Fire =

2005 American television series

Cooking Under Fire is a documentary-style series featuring 12 contestants in a traveling cooking competition in four cities in the United States. Judges were Ming Tsai, Michael Ruhlman and Todd English. The show was produced through WGBH.

The winner, Katie Hagan-Whelchel, was given a chef position at one of Todd English's New York City restaurants. The show aired for one season.
