= Veterans Home of California Yountville =

Hospital in California, United States

Coordinates: 38°23′39″N 122°21′54″W

The Veterans Home of California is located in Yountville, California, and was founded in 1884. The facility is the largest of its kind in the United States and has a population of almost 1200 aged and disabled veterans of World War II, the Korean War, the Vietnam War, the Gulf War, the War in Afghanistan, and Operation Enduring Freedom/Operation Iraqi Freedom. Several levels of care are offered to residents, including domiciliary services, residential care for the elderly, intermediate nursing care, skilled nursing care, and outpatient clinic.

The grounds of the facility include the 1,214 seat Lincoln Theater (home of Symphony Napa Valley, Orchestra Institute Napa Valley as well as a robust education program), a 9-hole golf course, baseball stadium, a swimming pool, an onsite U.S. Post Office, and a military base exchange branch store. All of these facilities are available for use by resident veterans at no additional cost. Additionally, the home offers services specifically for residents including a fitness center, a resident operated television station, a bowling alley, the auto hobby shop has been closed, it still has a 35,000 volume library, creative arts center, and a multi-faith chapel. A cemetery on the grounds holds the graves of more than 5,500 veterans and their spouses dating back to the Spanish–American War of 1898.

== Founding ==
In 1877, the Grand Army of the Republic first secured land in San Francisco for a veterans home; however, the property was deemed not appropriate.

The separate group advocating for a California Veteran's Home was officially founded on March 7, 1882. On October 25, 1882, after a successful fundraising campaign and a thorough investigation of alternative sites, the committee purchased a 910-acre site near Yountville, California for $17,750. Since 1883, the State of California had provided partial funding of $15,000 per year, under the assumption that this allocation would support 100 veterans. The home opened to its first residents on April 1, 1884. The institution was governed by an 11-member board, two from the Association of Mexican War Veterans, and nine from the Grand Army of the Republic representing Union Civil War Veterans. The California Veteran's Home was recognized as an official state institution in 1889. There were 17 residents when the home opened, but by the end of 1891, the population had grown to 408 men.

In the decade that followed its founding, both the Veterans Home and the Napa Valley struggled through difficult financial times until a private association was formed and was responsible for the home. It secured funding from both the state of California and the federal government, but in 1896 Washington determined that it could no longer fund a privately operated facility and withdrew its financial support. The association had no choice but to turn the Veterans Home over to the state of California in 1897. The state paid the association $20 and officially changed the name to the Veterans Home of California at Yountville. At the time the state took over the home, it had an estimated value of $320,000 and consisted of 55 steam-heated buildings with electric lighting, running water and a sewer system. The grounds also had a successful dairy, hog farm, and chicken ranch and was the home for 800 veterans of the Mexican, Civil, and Indian wars.

== Early 20th century ==
Col. Nelson M. Holderman, a World War I veteran and recipient of the Congressional Medal of Honor, was appointed commandant of the home in 1919. Although this combat-hardened soldier would fight many bureaucratic battles on behalf of the home, his biggest challenge would come from the Civil War veterans at the home and on its board who resisted changes he was advocating. Not wanting a confrontation with these old vets, he resigned as commandant in 1921, vowing to return. After several members passed from the board, Col. Holderman returned to his position as commandant in 1926 and remained there until his death in 1953. He is generally credited with a revitalization of the Veterans Home that can be seen and felt until today.

Holderman was able to overcome many political and bureaucratic roadblocks during his tenure and he replaced and remodeled many of the run-down administrative and residential buildings, as well as planted the now mature grove of towering trees from around the world, known as Holderman's Grove. Significantly, in 1929, he was also able to oversee the construction of a 500-bed hospital that the home had needed for years.

== Late 20th century ==
In the 1970s, the home faced another financial crisis. Decreased funding was having a degrading effect on facilities and staffing, to the point that the future of the home was in question. The California Health and Human Services Agency and United States Department of Health and Human Services were both threatening to withdraw certification from the home. The California State Legislature took action, approving a $100 million renovation master plan, reinforcing California's commitment, of over 100 years, to its veterans.

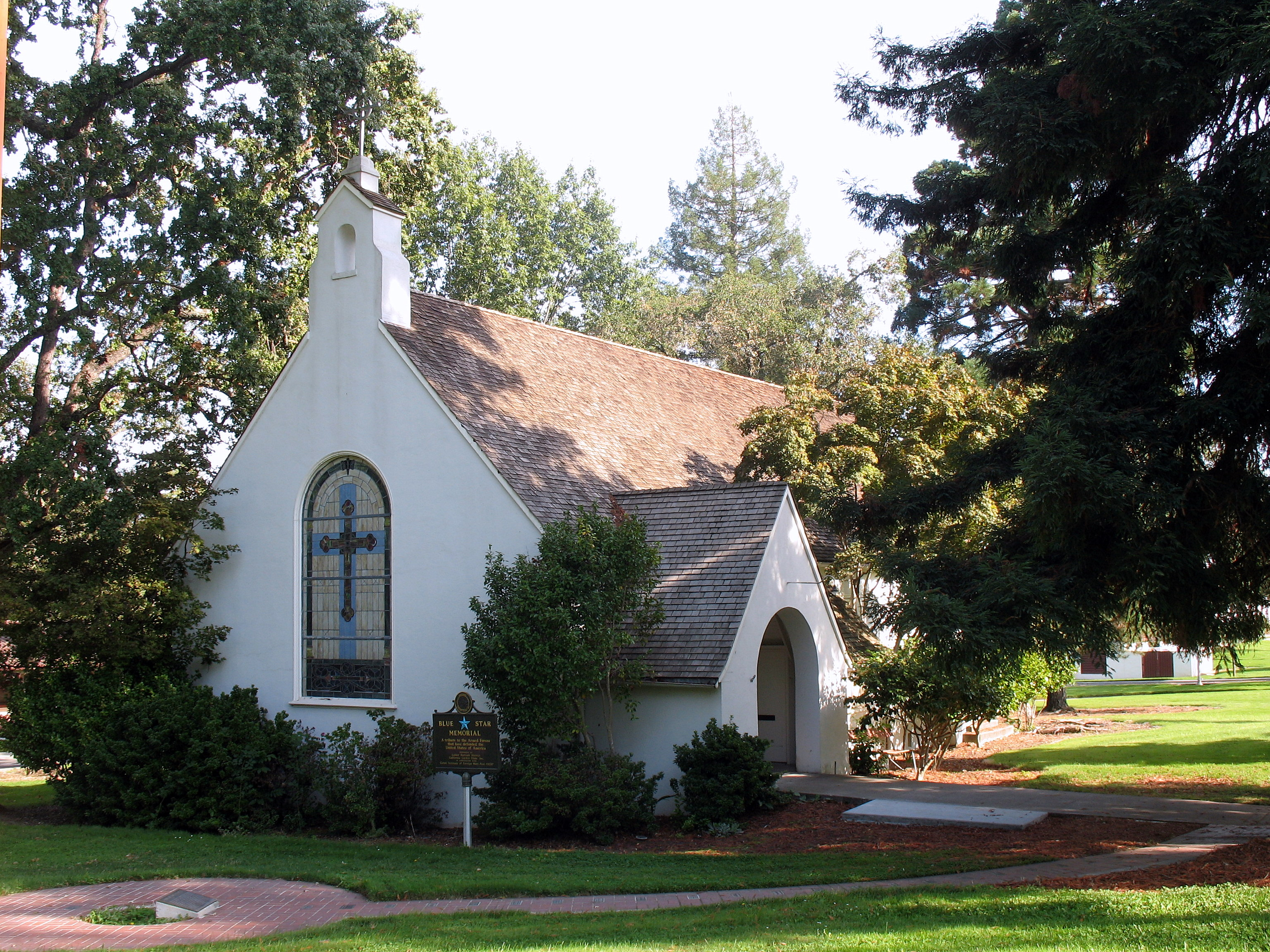

The 1918 Armistice Chapel was placed on the National Register of Historic Places in 1979 as NRIS #79000510.

== 21st century ==
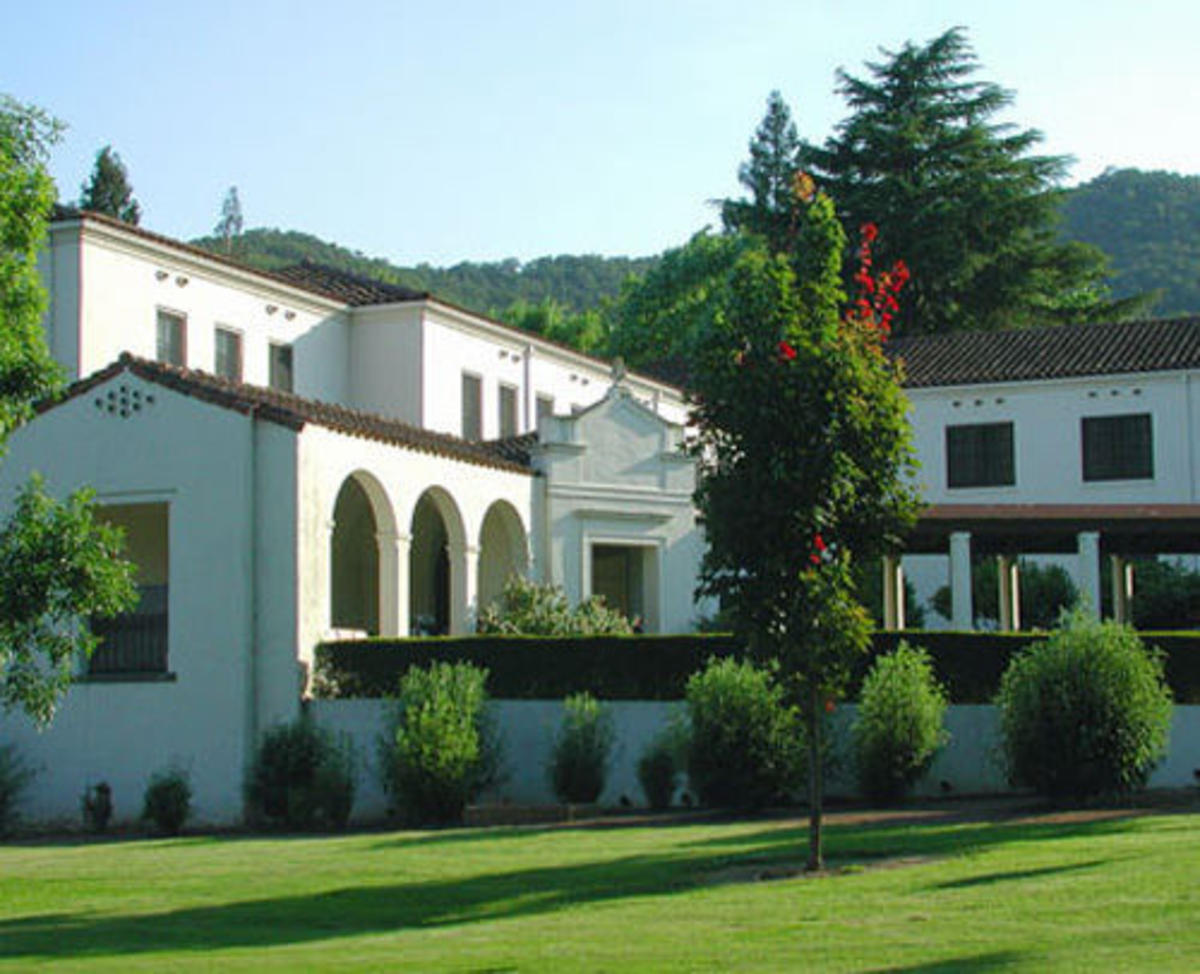

More than halfway through the renovation program, the Veterans' Home of California at Yountville is home to almost 1,200 veterans, including almost 150 women veterans and nearly 30 couples.

The home's director Donald Veverka took over the position in 2014 and was dismissed in 2017.

Veterans provide input through the Veterans' Home Allied Council, an official advisory body to the administrator. The home's annual operating budget is $47 million, with half funded by the California general fund and the rest from sources including federal reimbursements and member fees. The facility receives support from citizens, service clubs, and veterans' organizations such as AMVETS, the Veterans of Foreign Wars, Disabled American Veterans, and The American Legion.

The Home, located Wine Country of northern California, also houses the alternate seat of government for the governor's office and shares that duty with another state facility at Fresno.

The Home was the primary filming location for the 2014 documentary film, Of Men and War. The film documented the work of The Pathway Home, a residential treatment program meant to help post-9/11 veterans struggling with PTSD and TBIs reintegrate into society.

On March 9, 2018, the entire facility was placed on lockdown after reports of gunfire. A shooter took three hostages, employees of The Pathway Home. Shortly thereafter, the gunman killed all three hostages and then himself. The Napa Valley Register reported that the suspect had been discharged recently from a veterans' treatment program at The Pathway Home.

== Notable people ==
- Elizabeth D'Arcy Kinne (1843–1918), national president of the Woman's Relief Corps (WRC), assisted in establishing the institution.
