= Bouchon Bakery (cookbook) =

2012 cookbook by Thomas Keller and Sebastien Rouxel

- Authors: Thomas Keller and Sebastien Rouxel
- Illustrator: Deborah Jones
- Language: English
- Subject: Cookbook
- Published: 23 October 2012 (Artisan)
- Publication place: America
- Media type: Print
- Pages: 400
- Award: 2013 IACP Food Photography and Styling award
- ISBN: 978-1579654351

Bouchon Bakery is a 2012 cookbook written by American chef Thomas Keller and Sebastien Rouxel. The cookbook's pastry recipes are based on those from Keller's restaurant Bouchon Bakery, where co-author Rouxel works as a pastry chef. Bouchon Bakery contains close to 150 recipes, as well as cooking tips and techniques. Keller tested many of the recipes with gluten-free flour. Bouchon Bakery emphasizes "clean cooking". Recipes contained in Bouchon Bakery include shortcrust pastry, laminated dough, croissants, choux pastry, brioche and levain bread, as well as a recipe for baked dog food.

The New York Times food critic William Grimes called Bouchon Bakery "a real cookbook" but noted that "going to Keller for a blueberry muffin recipe seems a little like hiring Frank Gehry to design your birdhouse". Russ Parsons of the Los Angeles Times wrote that "so many "finesse points" are demonstrated and explained that one could conceivably start a bakery by cooking your way through" Bouchon Bakery. LA Weekly called Bouchon Bakery "surprisingly approachable" and "one glorious pastry book".

Bouchon Bakery won the 2013 IACP award for food photography and styling.
