= Bouchon (restaurant) =

French-style restaurant with locations in the U.S.

Coordinates: 38.402645°N 122.361905°W

- Bouchon and Bouchon Bakery, Yountville, California
- Interactive map of Bouchon

Restaurant information
- Established: 1998; 28 years ago
- Owner: Thomas Keller
- Head chef: Ryan King
- Chef: Garett Michael
- Food type: French
- Location: 6534 Washington St, Yountville, California, 94599, United States
- Other locations: Multiple
- Website: bouchonbistro.com

Bouchon (also known as Bouchon Bistro) is a French-style restaurant with locations in Yountville, California and Las Vegas. The restaurant was founded by Thomas Keller in 1998.

The Yountville location was awarded a star by the Michelin Guide for its 2007 edition, but lost it fifteen years later with the 2022 update.

== Menu ==
Bouchon serves French bistro-style food customarily found in Europe; its culinary style has been described as informal with minimalist elements.

A main course of chicken and accompaniments

Appetizers of bread and cheese

== Bouchon Bakery ==
Keller started and expanded Bouchon Bakery, a casual café which offers salads, sandwiches, and pastries at more affordable prices than his other restaurants. In 2012, Keller wrote a cookbook, Bouchon Bakery, based on recipes from the café.
