= Ad Hoc (restaurant) =

Coordinates: 38.39921°N 122.35857°W

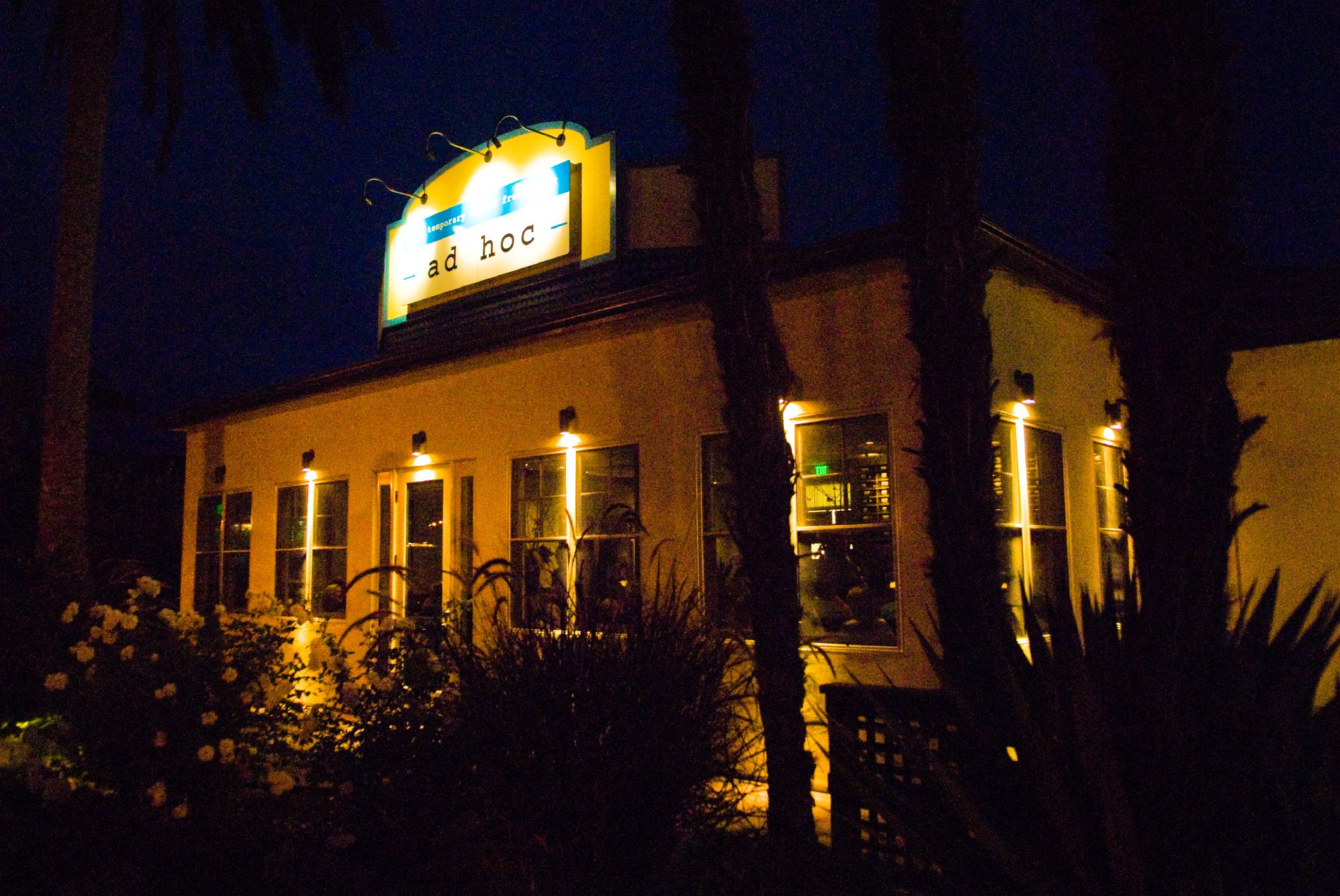
- Interactive map of Ad Hoc

Restaurant information
- Established: 2006; 20 years ago
- Owner: Thomas Keller
- Food type: Comfort food
- Dress code: Casual
- Location: 6476 Washington St., Yountville, California, 94599, United States
- Reservations: Yes
- Website: Official site

Ad Hoc is a family-style comfort food restaurant in Yountville, California. Opened by Thomas Keller in September 2006, Ad Hoc was meant to serve as a temporary cafe for six months but was retained as a permanent establishment.

== History ==
Thomas Keller opened Ad Hoc in 2006 to serve as a temporary cafe. His intention was to have Ad Hoc serve as a six-month venture while preparing his new restaurant for the space, which would focus on hamburger and wine pairings. Ad Hoc was opened quickly, with little changes to the decor in the temporary space, and serving a nightly single four-course meal at a flat price. One menu allowed Ad Hoc to limit problems with finding and stocking ingredients, and menus were planned loosely about a week in advance, and finalized 48 hours before. Occasionally the menu would change based on seasonal ingredients or last minute ingredient availabilities.

In 2006, Keller was interviewed by food critic Michael Bauer from SFGate and was asked if the venture would really be temporary. In response, he stated that he did not know and that if it was to go beyond the six-month time period they would need to change the name and "...Maybe we'd call it Ad Lib." Bauer stated that the restaurant would become a permanent establishment, and described it having a "Chez Panisse sensibility."

Keller decided to make Ad Hoc a permanent venture in 2007 following the success of the concept. The menu continues to serve a one menu, four-course meal. Foods offered include fried chicken, duck leg confit, short ribs and other similar comfort foods. Ad Hoc provides food pairings for the Bespoke Collection.
