= Yountville, California =

City in the United States

- Town
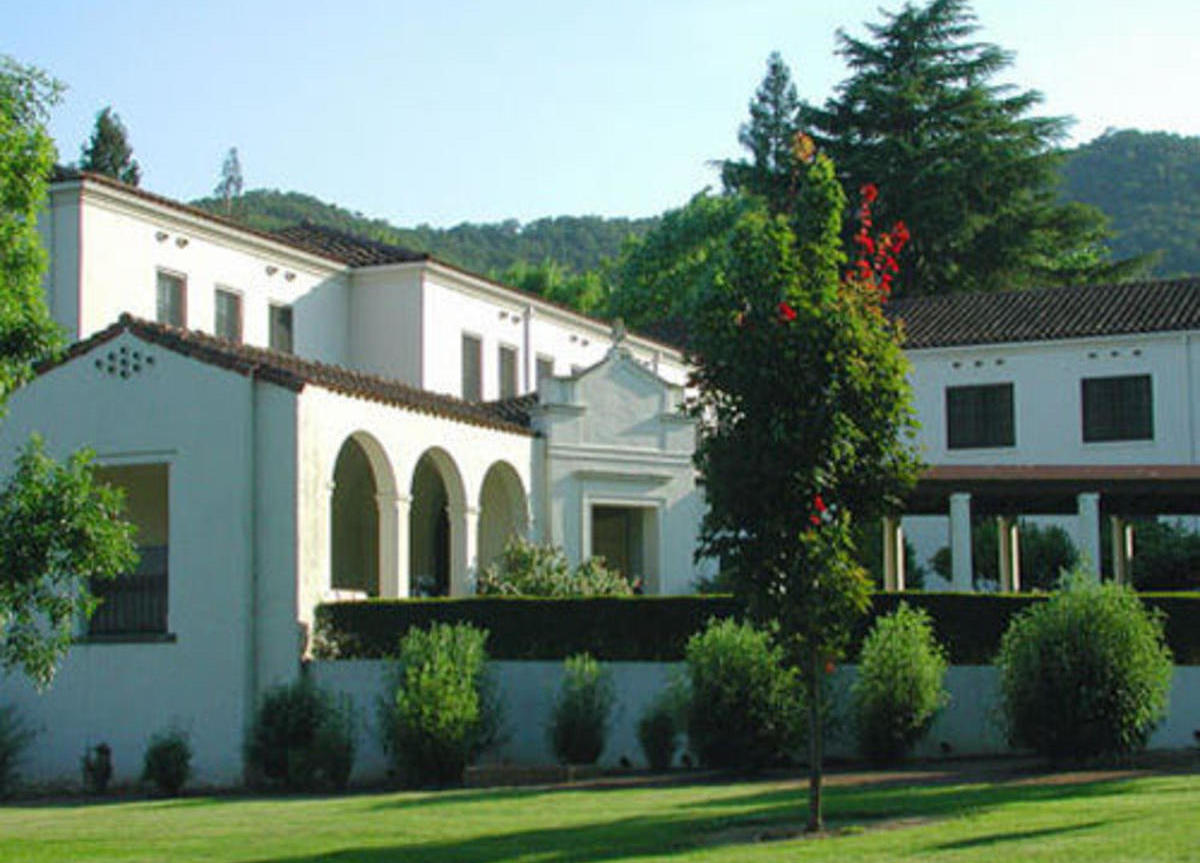
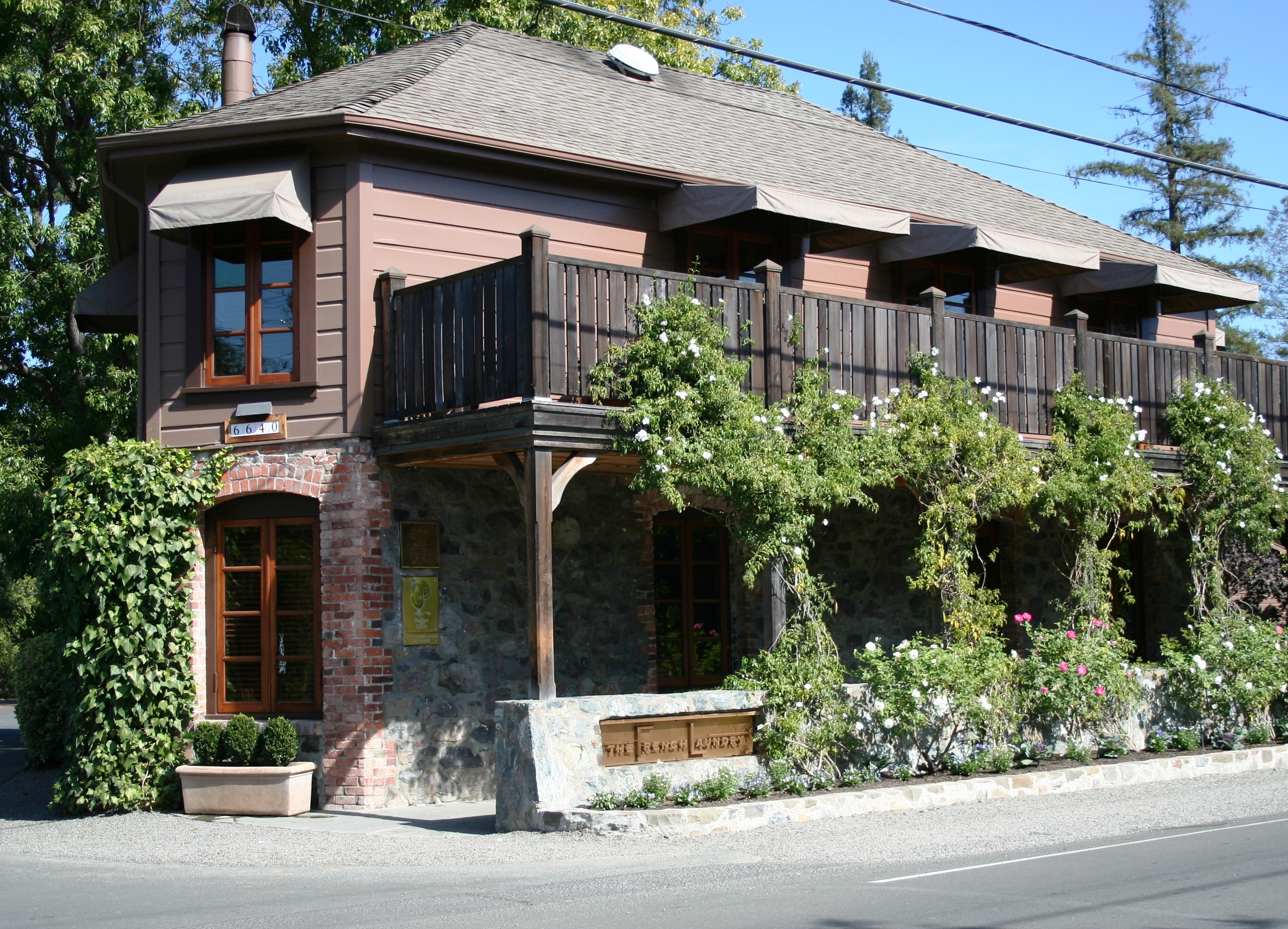
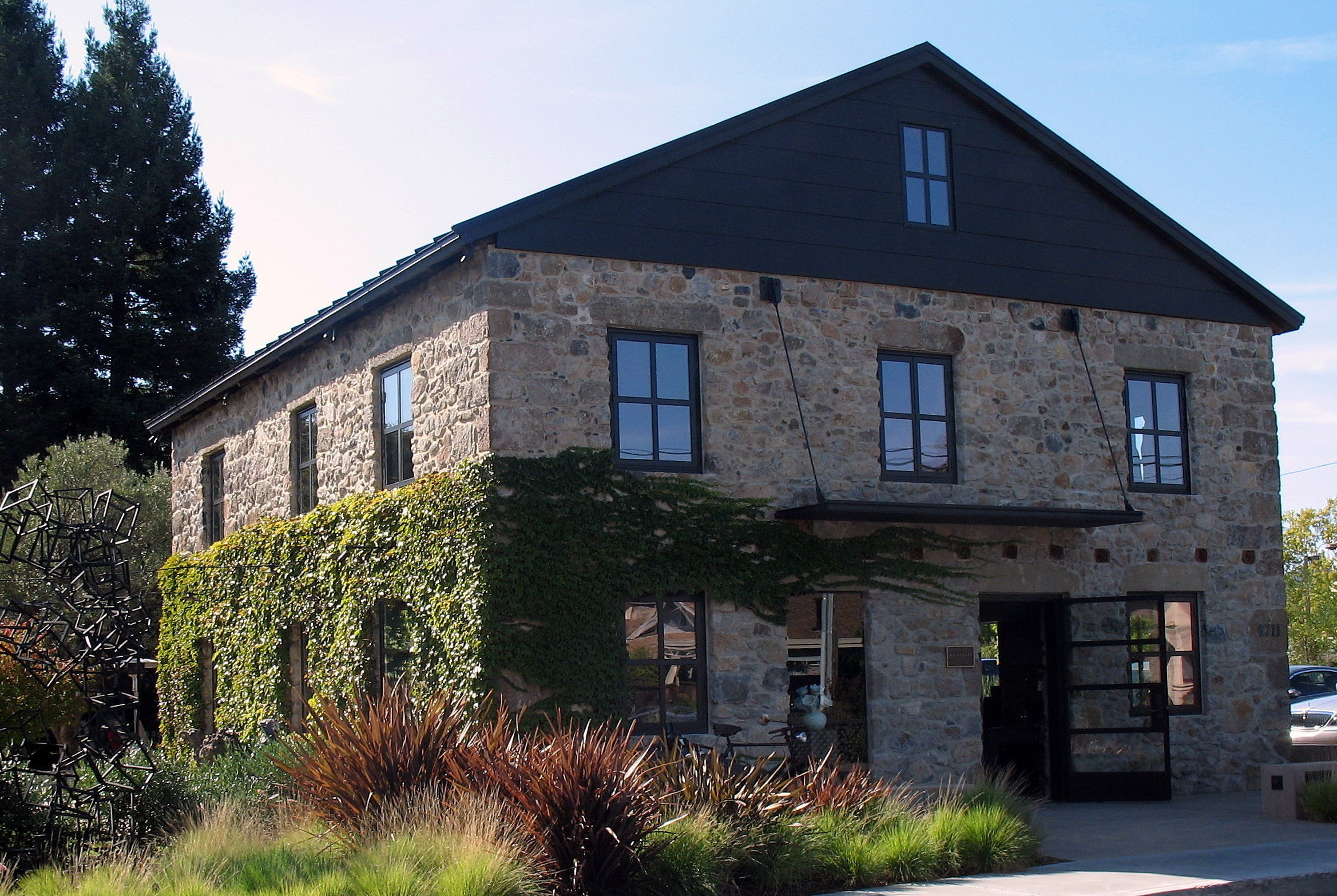
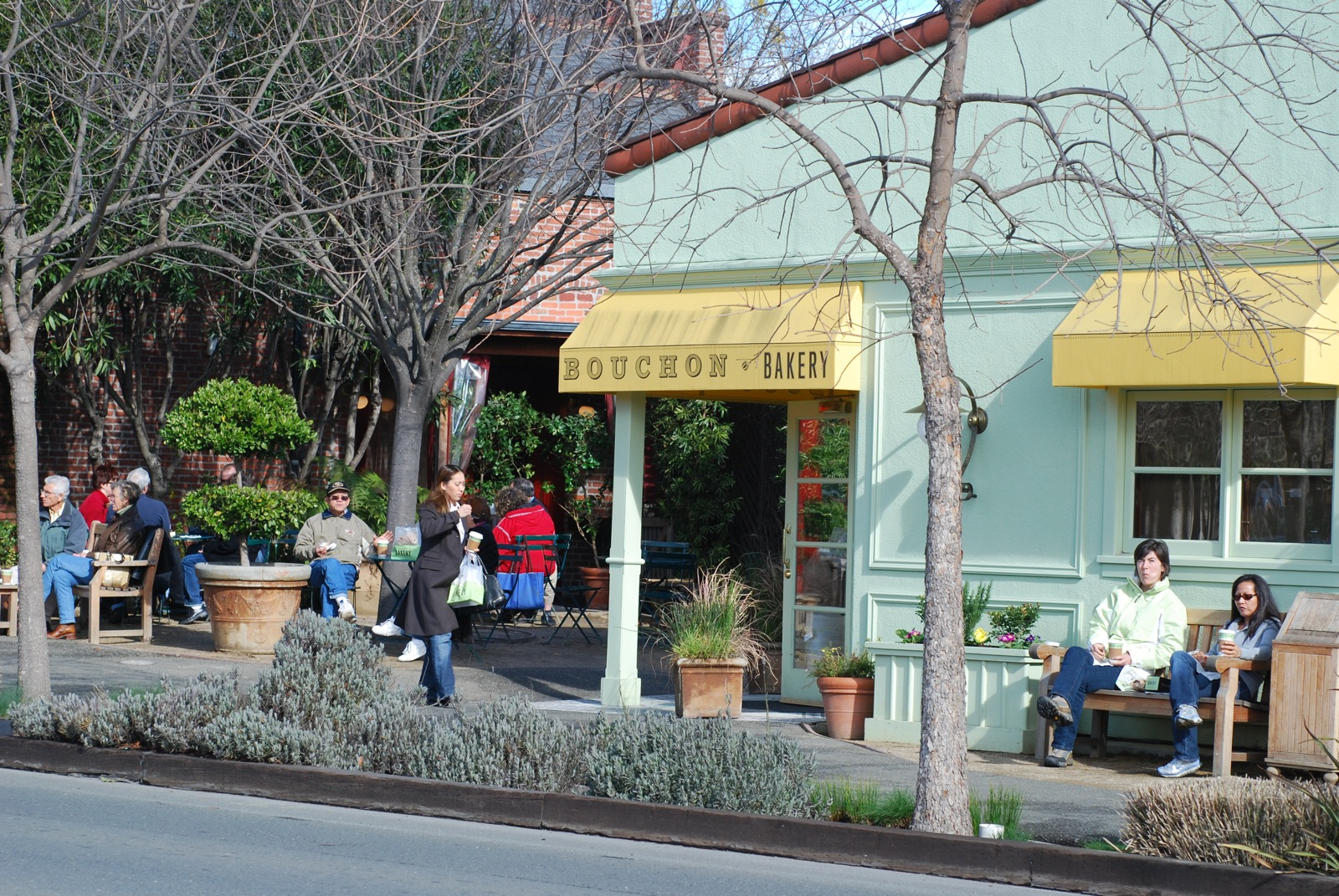
- Clockwise: Veterans Home of California Yountville; The French Laundry; Bouchon Bakery; Rovegno House
- Interactive map of Yountville, California
- Coordinates: 38°24′11″N 122°21′44″W
- Country: United States
- State: California
- County: Napa
- Incorporated: February 4, 1965

Area
  - Total: 1.49 sq mi (3.86 km^{2})
  - Land: 1.49 sq mi (3.85 km^{2})
  - Water: 0.0039 sq mi (0.01 km^{2}) 0%
- Elevation: 98 ft (30 m)

Population (2020)
  - Total: 3,436
  - Density: 2,310/sq mi (892/km^{2})
- Time zone: UTC-8 (Pacific (PST))
  - Summer (DST): UTC-7 (PDT)
- ZIP code: 94599
- Area code: 707
- FIPS code: 06-86930
- GNIS feature ID: 1652660
- Website: www.townofyountville.gov

Yountville (/ˈjɔːntvɪl/ or /ˈjaʊntvɪl/) is an incorporated town in Napa County, in the Wine Country of California, United States. Located in the North Bay region of the Bay Area, the population was 3,436 at the 2020 census. Almost a third of the town's population lives at the Veterans Home of California. Yountville is a popular tourist destination, particularly for its wineries and its famed Michelin-starred restaurant, The French Laundry.

== History ==
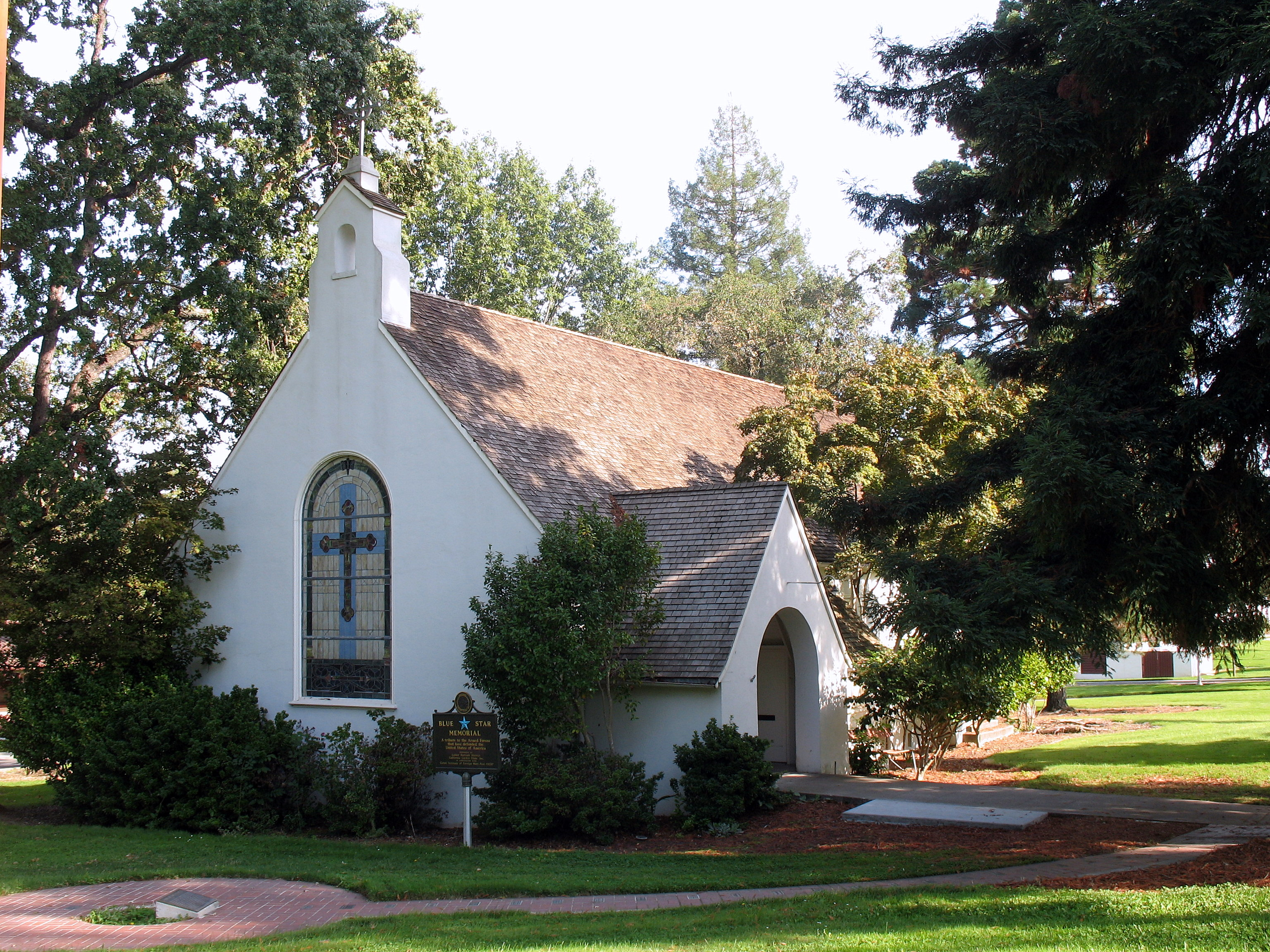
The historic chapel at the Veterans Home of California

The town was named Sebastopol in 1855.

A town in nearby Sonoma County had already claimed that name, and thus the town was renamed in 1867 to honor George C. Yount, following his death. Yount was considered responsible for establishing the first vineyard in the Napa Valley.

== Geography ==
Yountville is located within Napa Valley, in the North Bay region of the San Francisco Bay Area of Northern California.

According to the United States Census Bureau, the town has a total area of 1.5 sq mi (4.0 km^{2}), all land.

A 5.2 magnitude earthquake occurred in Yountville on September 3, 2000.

=== Climate ===
Climate data for Yountville, California
Month	Jan	Feb	Mar	Apr	May	Jun	Jul	Aug	Sep	Oct	Nov	Dec	Year
Mean daily maximum °F (°C)	56 (13)	62 (17)	65 (18)	70 (21)	76 (24)	83 (28)	87 (31)	87 (31)	85 (29)	77 (25)	65 (18)	56 (13)	72 (22)
Mean daily minimum °F (°C)	38 (3)	40 (4)	42 (6)	43 (6)	47 (8)	51 (11)	53 (12)	52 (11)	51 (11)	47 (8)	42 (6)	38 (3)	45 (7)
Average precipitation inches (mm)	6.02 (153)	6.15 (156)	4.39 (112)	1.78 (45)	1.06 (27)	.19 (4.8)	0 (0)	.09 (2.3)	.24 (6.1)	1.64 (42)	3.86 (98)	6.21 (158)	31.63 (804.2)

== Demographics ==
Historical population
Census	Pop.	Note	%±
1880	256		—
1890	231		−9.8%
1970	2,332		—
1980	2,893		24.1%
1990	3,259		12.7%
2000	2,916		−10.5%
2010	2,933		0.6%
2020	3,436		17.1%
U.S. Decennial Census

=== 2020 ===
The 2020 United States census reported that Yountville had a population of 3,436. The population density was 2,310.7 inhabitants per square mile (892.2/km^{2}). The racial makeup of Yountville was 84.7% White, 1.9% African American, 0.9% Native American, 2.1% Asian, 0.1% Pacific Islander, 3.7% from other races, and 6.6% from two or more races. Hispanic or Latino of any race were 10.1% of the population.

The census reported that 55.4% of the population lived in households, 13.5% lived in non-institutionalized group quarters, and 31.2% were institutionalized.

There were 1,047 households, out of which 11.2% included children under the age of 18, 37.4% were married-couple households, 5.6% were cohabiting couple households, 37.8% had a female householder with no partner present, and 19.1% had a male householder with no partner present. 43.6% of households were one person, and 27.3% were one person aged 65 or older. The average household size was 1.82. There were 498 families (47.6% of all households).

The age distribution was 5.4% under the age of 18, 1.7% aged 18 to 24, 9.3% aged 25 to 44, 16.8% aged 45 to 64, and 66.8% who were 65 years of age or older. The median age was 74.0 years. For every 100 females, there were 112.9 males.

There were 1,348 housing units at an average density of 906.5 units per square mile (350.0 units/km^{2}), of which 1,047 (77.7%) were occupied. Of these, 63.6% were owner-occupied, and 36.4% were occupied by renters.

=== 2023 estimates ===
In 2023, the US Census Bureau estimated that the median household income was $79,696, and the per capita income was $65,863. About 5.5% of families and 11.5% of the population were below the poverty line.

== Economy ==
Major employers in Yountville include the Veterans Home of California and The Vintage Estate. Domaine Chandon California is located immediately outside city limits.

== Media ==
The Yountville Sun is a weekly newspaper with a 1,000 circulation published in the city since 1998. It was founded by Oscar Rhodes and his wife Sharon Stensaas, who sold it to Marc Hand of Highway 29 Media in 2022. The Sun went on hiatus in 2025 due to poor advertisement sales. A year later, the paper officially ceased, only for billionaire Gary Jabara to acquire and relaunch it.

== Arts and culture ==
=== Culinary scene ===
The French Laundry, founded by Sally Schmitt in 1978 and now owned by chef Thomas Keller, has a three-star Michelin Guide rating, and was twice named the "best restaurant in the world" by "The Worlds 50 Best" restaurant rating organization. Yountville is also the home of a Michelin one-star restaurant, Bouchon, also owned by Thomas Keller. With more than one Michelin star per 1,000 residents, Yountville claims the most Michelin stars per capita of anywhere in North America.

=== Attractions ===
- Bespoke Collection
- Napa Valley Museum
- Lincoln Theatre
- The Yountville American Viticultural Area
- Veterans Memorial Grove Cemetery (also known as the California State Veterans Home Cemetery)
- George C. Yount Pioneer Cemetery
- Vine Trail Bike Path

== Government ==
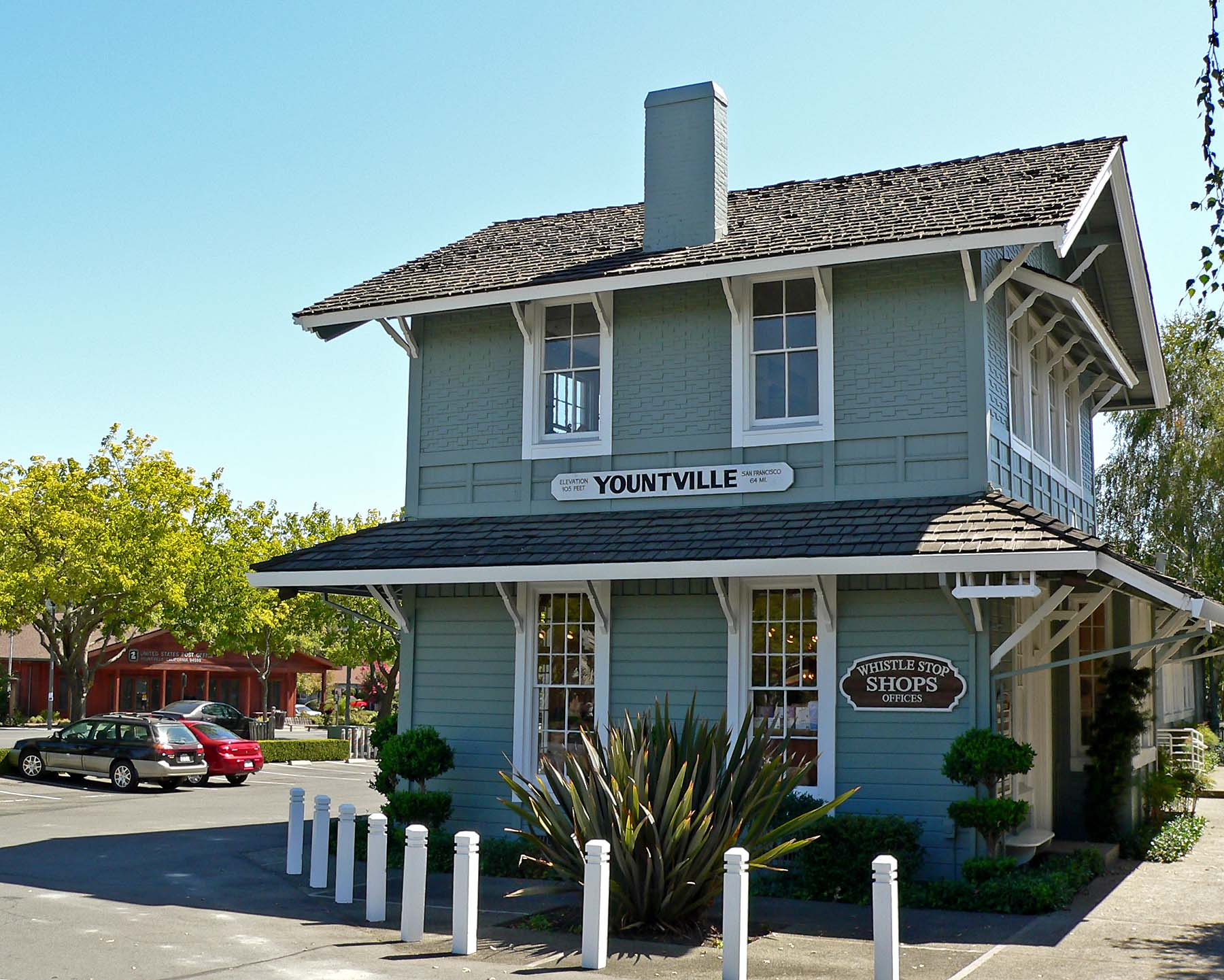
Old rail station

The Town of Yountville has a council–manager form of government. The mayor is Margie Mohler.

In the California State Legislature, Yountville is in the 3rd senatorial district, represented by Democrat Christopher Cabaldon, and in the 4th Assembly district, represented by Democrat Cecilia Aguiar-Curry.

In the United States House of Representatives, Yountville is in California's 4th congressional district, represented by Democrat Mike Thompson.

== Twin towns – sister cities ==
Yountville is twinned with:

- Kaštela, Croatia

== See also ==
- Yountville shooting
- Napa City-County Library
- Yountville Hills
