= Thomas Keller =

American chef, restaurateur and author (born 1955)

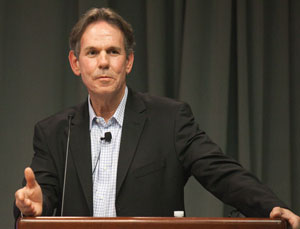
- Keller in 2009
- Born: Thomas Aloysius Keller; October 14, 1955 (age 71); Camp Pendleton, California, U.S.
- Education: Apprenticeship
- Spouse: Laura Cunningham
- Culinary career
- Cooking style: French
- Ratings
- Michelin stars AAA Motor Club; Forbes Travel Guide
- Current restaurants
- The French Laundry (Yountville, California); Per Se (New York City); Surf Club (Miami, FL); Bouchon (Yountville, California); Bouchon Bakery (Yountville, California) ad hoc (Yountville, California); Bouchon (Las Vegas); Bouchon (Coral Gables, Florida)

Thomas Aloysius Keller (born October 14, 1955) is an American chef, restaurateur and cookbook author. He and his Napa Valley restaurant, the French Laundry in Yountville, California, have won multiple awards from the James Beard Foundation, including Best California Chef in 1996 and Best Chef in America in 1997. The restaurant was a perennial winner in the annual Restaurant list of the Top 50 Restaurants of the World; the voting process has since been changed to disallow previous winners from being considered.

In 2005, he was awarded three stars in the inaugural Michelin Guide for New York City for his restaurant Per Se, and in 2006, he was awarded three stars in the inaugural Michelin Guide to the San Francisco Bay Area for the French Laundry. He is the only American chef to have been awarded simultaneous three-star Michelin ratings for two different restaurants. His restaurants hold seven Michelin stars in total: three at Per Se, three at the French Laundry, and one at the Surf Club Restaurant.

== Early life and career ==
Keller's mother was a restaurateur who employed Thomas as help when her cook got sick. Four years after his parents divorced, the family moved east and settled in Palm Beach, Florida. In his teenage summers, he worked at the Palm Beach Yacht Club starting as a dishwasher and quickly moving up to cook, where he discovered his passion for cooking and perfection of the hollandaise sauce.

During summers, he worked as a cook in Rhode Island. He was discovered by the chef Roland Henin and was tasked to cook staff meals at The Dunes Club. Under Henin's study, Keller learned the fundamentals of classical French cooking. After The Dunes Club, Keller worked various cooking positions in Florida and soon became the cook at a small French restaurant called La Rive in the Hudson River valley in Catskill, New York. Thomas worked alone with the couple's grandmother as prep cook. Given free rein, he built a smokehouse to cure meats, developed relationships with local livestock purveyors and learned to cook entrails and offal under his old mentor, Roland Henin, who would drop by on occasional weekends. After three years at La Rive, unable to buy it from the owners, he left and moved to New York and then Paris, apprenticing at various Michelin-starred restaurants.

After returning to America in 1984, he was hired as chef de cuisine at La Reserve in New York, before leaving to open Rakel in early 1987. Rakel's refined French cuisine catered to the expensive tastes of Wall Street executives and received a two-star review from The New York Times. Its popularity waned as the stock market bottomed out and at the end of the 1980s, Keller left, unwilling to compromise his style of cooking to simple bistro fare.

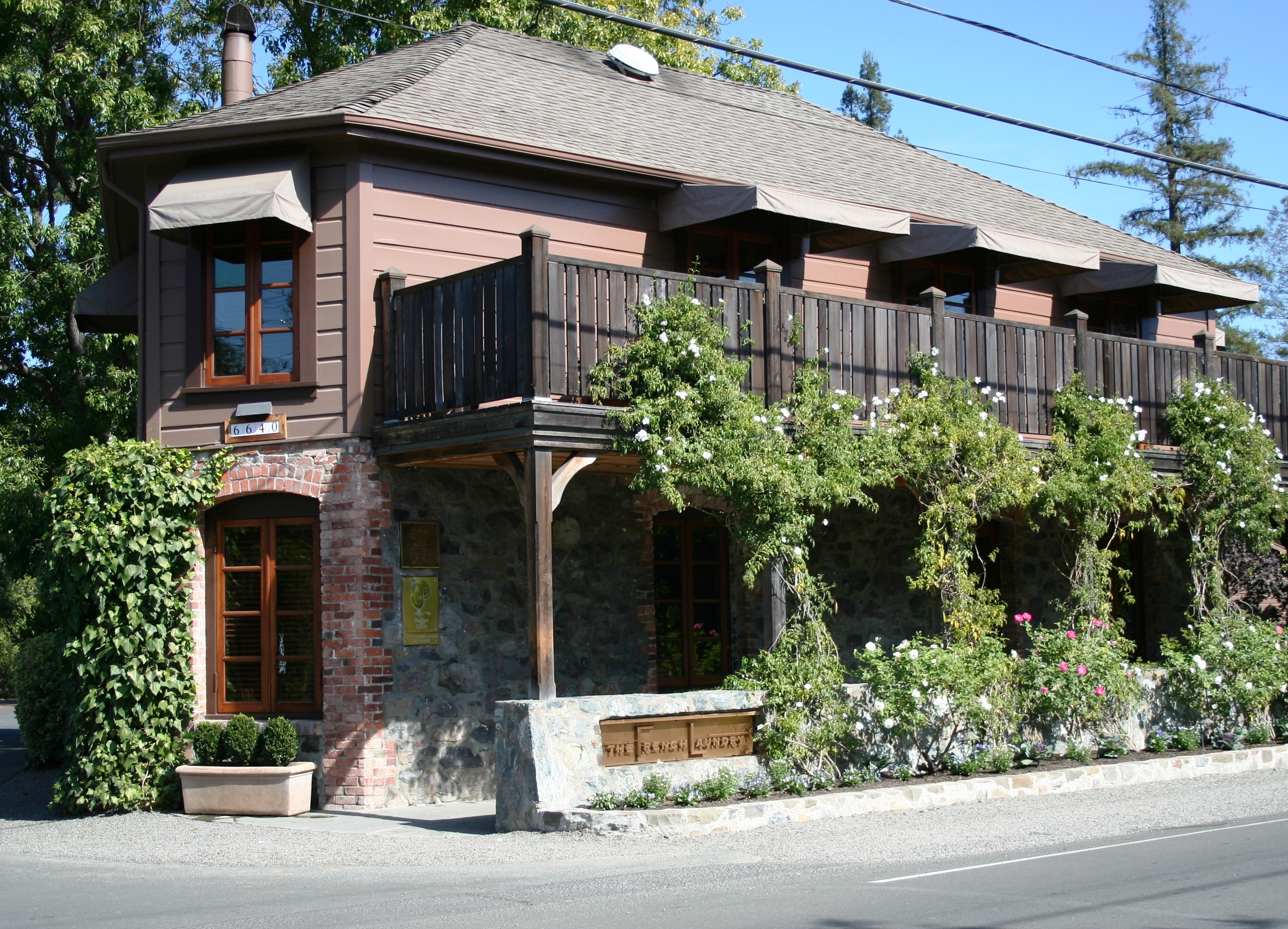
The French Laundry in Yountville, California

== The French Laundry ==
Following the split with his partner at Rakel, Keller took various consultant and chef positions in New York and Los Angeles. In the spring of 1992 he came upon a restaurant in Yountville, California, founded by Sally Schmitt, in a space formerly occupied by an old French steam laundry. She and her husband Don purchased the building in 1978 and converted it into a restaurant. Keller spent nineteen months raising $1.2 million from acquaintances and investors to purchase the restaurant, then re-opened it in 1994. Over the next few years the restaurant earned numerous awards, including from the James Beard Foundation, gourmet magazines, the Mobil Guide (five stars), and the Michelin Guide (three stars).

== Other restaurants and pursuits ==
=== Food and dining ===
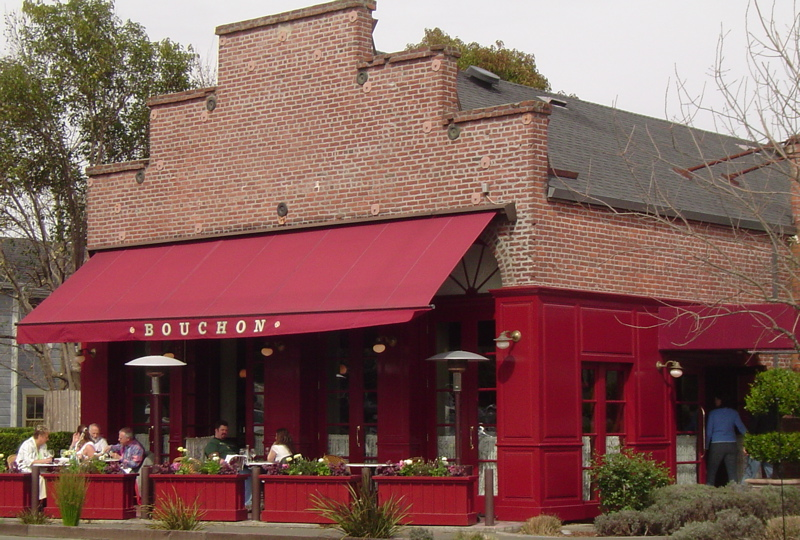
Bouchon restaurant in Yountville, California

After the success of the French Laundry, Thomas and his brother, Joseph Keller (currently owner/chef of Josef's in Las Vegas), opened Bouchon in 1998. Located down the street from the French Laundry, it serves moderately priced French bistro fare, with Bouchon Bakery opening next door a few years later (in 2006 Keller opened a branch of the bakery in the Time Warner Center in Manhattan). Keller has joked in the past that the motivation for Bouchon's opening was to give him somewhere to eat after work at the French Laundry. On January 26, 2004, Keller opened his restaurant Bouchon in Las Vegas. On February 16, 2004, Keller's much-anticipated Per Se restaurant opened in the Time Warner Center complex in New York under the helm of Keller's Chef de Cuisine, Jonathan Benno. Per Se, which was designed from scratch and custom-built as part of the overall construction process, was an immediate hit on the New York restaurant scene, with reservations booked months in advance and publications including The New Yorker and The New York Times giving rave reviews. The latest restaurant, "ad hoc", opened in September 2006 in Yountville with a different fixed price comfort food dinner served family style every night. Originally intended to be a temporary project while Keller planned his lifelong dream restaurant for the location, serving hamburgers and wine, he decided to make ad hoc permanent and find a new location for the hamburger restaurant due to its popularity.

- Yountville, CA: ad hoc, addendum (closed), Bouchon, Bouchon Bakery, Burgers and Half Bottles, the French Laundry, La Calenda (closed), Regiis Ova
- New York: Bouchon Bakery, Per Se, TAK Room (closed)
- Las Vegas: Bouchon, Bouchon Bakery
- Miami: The Surf Club, Bouchon Bistro

Prior to the opening of the French Laundry, Thomas Keller started a small olive oil company called EVO, Inc. in 1992, with his girlfriend of the time, to distribute Provençal-style olive oil and red wine vinegar. Recently, Keller started marketing a line of signature white Limoges porcelain dinnerware by Raynaud called Hommage Point (in homage to French chef and restaurateur, Fernand Point) that he helped and a collection of silver hollow ware by Christofle. He has also attached his name to a set of signature knives manufactured by MAC.

Keller is the president of the Bocuse d'Or U.S. team and was responsible for recruiting and training the 2009 candidates. The former French Laundry Chef de Cuisine Timothy Hollingsworth won the Bocuse d'Or USA semi-finals in 2008, and represented the U.S. in the world finals in January 2009 under Keller's supervision where he placed 6th. On describing his reasons for accepting the Bocuse d'Or Team USA presidency, Keller stated, "When Chef [Paul] Bocuse calls you on the phone and says he’d like you to be president of the American team, you say, ‘Oui, chef’. He's the role model, the icon".

In 2012 he announced he was at the point of his career when it was time to step away from the kitchen. The important thing, he said, is to make sure to give to young chefs the right things, the right mentoring because "if we're not truly working to raise the standards of our profession, then we're not really doing our job." He permanently closed his restaurant TAK Room, located in Hudson Yards, during the coronavirus pandemic. The throwback restaurant had been opened in March 2019, and had been his first New York restaurant in 15 years.

=== Publishing and film ===
In 1999, Thomas Keller published The French Laundry Cookbook, which he considers his definitive book on cuisine. That year it won three International Association of Culinary Professionals (IACP) awards for Cookbook of the Year, Julia Child "First Cookbook" Award, and Design Award. In 2004 he published "The Bouchon Cookbook," although he gives most of the credit to Bouchon chef Jeffrey Cerciello. Other cookbooks that he has written or contributed are The Food Lover's Companion to the Napa Valley, Under Pressure: Cooking Sous Vide, Ad Hoc at Home (2009) and Bouchon Bakery (2012). He provided an introduction or foreword to The Vineyard Kitchen: Menus Inspired by the Seasons by Maria Helm Sinskey, "Happy in the Kitchen" by Michel Richard, "Indulge: 100 Perfect Desserts" by Claire Clark (head pastry chef at the French Laundry), the new publication of "Ma Gastronomie" by Fernand Point, "Charcuterie: The Craft of Salting, Smoking, and Curing" by Micheal Ruhlman and Brian Polcyn. He is also featured in "My Last Supper" by Melanie Dunea.

Working on the film Spanglish, Keller designed and taught star Adam Sandler to cook what is often called "the world's greatest sandwich", as a plausible example of what a talented bachelor gourmet might cook for himself. The sandwich resembles a typical BLT, with the addition of a fried egg. In an interview with Vogue Man Arabia he described the BLT as "the perfect sandwich". Keller served as a consultant for the 2007 Pixar animated film Ratatouille, allowing the producer to intern in the French Laundry kitchen and designing a fancy layered version of ratatouille, "confit byaldi", for the characters to cook. In the American version he makes a cameo appearance as a restaurant patron (the part is played by one of Keller's mentors Guy Savoy in the French version, and Ferran Adrià in the Spanish one). Keller is frequently referenced in the restaurant workplace comedy-drama The Bear, with Keller making a special guest appearance as himself in the Season 3 episode "Forever". A different character in the series portrayed by Joel McHale is very loosely based on Keller, although with exaggerated negative character traits.

Keller currently has three online cooking classes at Masterclass.com.

== Personal life ==
In April 2009, Keller became engaged to longtime girlfriend and former general manager at the French Laundry, Laura Cunningham.

In 2026, Keller staunchly opposed the construction of a 120-unit apartment building several blocks from The French Laundry, intended for workers in Yountville who had been priced out of the expensive housing in town. Keller argued that workers neither wanted nor needed the housing.

== Awards ==
- Best American Chef: California, James Beard Foundation, 1996
- Outstanding Chef: America, James Beard Foundation, 1997
- Chef of the Year, Bon Appétit Magazine, 1998
- Voted #1 – Top Food, Zagat Guide to the Bay Area, 1998–2003
- Five-Star Award, Mobil Travel Guide, 1999–2004
- Who's Who of Food and Beverage in America, 2000
- Favorite Restaurant – Restaurant Experts' Poll, Food & Wine Magazine, 2000
- Top Restaurant for Food, Wine Spectator Magazine, 2000
- America's Best Chef, TIME Magazine, 2001
- Outstanding Wine Service Award, James Beard Foundation, 2001
- Outstanding Service Award, James Beard Foundation, 2003
- Best Restaurant in the World (French Laundry), Restaurant Magazine's Top 50 Restaurants of the World, 2003, 2004
- Best Restaurant in the Americas (French Laundry), Restaurant Magazine's Top 50 Restaurants of the World, 2005–2008
- Best New Restaurant (Per Se), James Beard Foundation, 2005
- Outstanding Restaurant (French Laundry), James Beard Foundation, 2006
- Michelin Guide New York City, 3 Stars for Per Se, November 2005 – Current
- Michelin Guide California, 3 Stars for The French Laundry, 2006 – Current
- Michelin Guide California, 1 Star for Bouchon, 2007 – 2021
- Michelin Guide Florida, 1 Star for the Surf Club Restaurant, 2022 – Current
- Gayot Top 40 Restaurants in the US (French Laundry) 2004 – 2010
- Gayot Top 40 Restaurants in the US (Per Se) 2010
- Chevalier in the French Legion of Honor, presented by Chef Paul Bocuse on March 29, 2011, in NYC
- Lifetime Achievement Award (French Laundry) Restaurant Magazine's Top 50 Restaurants of the World
- Culinary Hall of Fame Induction.
- Golden Plate Award of the American Academy of Achievement, 2014

== Bibliography ==
- Keller, T. The French Laundry Cookbook. Artisan Publishers, 1999. ISBN 1-57965-126-7
- Keller, T. Bouchon. Artisan Publishers, 2004. ISBN 1-57965-239-5
- Keller, T. Under Pressure: Cooking Sous Vide. Artisan Publishers, 2008. ISBN 1-57965-351-0
- Keller, T. Ad Hoc at Home. Artisan Publishers, 2009. ISBN 978-1-57965-377-4
- Keller, T. Bouchon Bakery. Artisan Publishers, 2012. ISBN 978-1-57965-435-1
- Keller, T. The French Laundry, Per Se. Artisan Publishers, 2020. ISBN 978-1-57965-849-6
