= Bocuse =

Bocuse is a French surname. Notable people with the surname include:

- Paul Bocuse (1926–2018), French master chef and culinary leader
- Jérôme Bocuse, son of Paul Bocuse, vice-president of the Bocuse d'Or USA Foundation

== See also ==
- Bocuse d'Or, biennial international culinary contest for chef and commis held in Lyon, France
- Bocuse d'Or USA, biennial U.S. national semi-finals for participation in Bocuse d'Or
- L'Auberge du Pont de Collonges, commonly called "Bocuse" or "Paul Bocuse", French restaurant of Paul Bocuse in Lyon, France
