= CityZen =

Restaurant in Washington, D.C., U.S.

Coordinates: 38.8848°N 77.0304°W

CityZen was a formal dining restaurant located in the Mandarin Oriental Washington hotel in Washington, D.C., in the United States. Established in 2004, it served modern American cuisine. Eric Ziebold had been its executive chef since its opening.

The restaurant ceased operations on December 6, 2014. It was replaced by chef Kwame Onwuachi's Afro-Caribbean restaurant Dōgon, which opened on September 9, 2024.

== About the restaurant ==
CityZen opened in September 2004, about five months after the hotel did. Executive chef Eric Ziebold left The French Laundry in Napa Valley, California to lead CityZen. Its name was a play on the word "citizen" (a name which Ziebold did not choose).

CityZen was located in a very high-ceilinged room decorated with soothing colors and soft, warm lighting. The kitchen was visible from many of the tables.

Tom Sietsma, food critic for The Washington Post had unqualified, extraordinary praise for CityZen in 2004: "If you really care about food, you owe yourself an evening at CityZen. ...CityZen is still a young restaurant. But already it's an important one." He called the food "often-extraordinary", and CityZen "tantalizingly close to the gold standard." CityZen was named best new restaurant of the year by the Restaurant Association of Metropolitan Washington in June 2005.

Sietsma maintained his extraordinarily high opinion of CityZen into 2013. Washingtonian magazine named it one of very best of the city's top 100 restaurants and gave it similarly high praise in 2013, concluding, "It's not the palatial setting, the impressively informed service, or even the virtuosic range of this restaurant's contemporary American menu that lingers long after the meal is over. It's the exuberance of Eric Ziebold's cooking, which gives soulful ballast to an evening of over-the-top elegance." WUSA declared CityZen "the place to go when you're looking for an elegant evening of gorgeous cutting-edge, modern cuisine." The anonymous reviewer especially liked the restaurant's tasting menus, which it called "visually stunning and highlight only the best of fresh, local, seasonal ingredients." In May 2014, USA Today picked CityZen as its fifth favorite restaurant in Washington, D.C. Calling CityZen "a favorite special occasion restaurant", reviewer Melanie Renzulli also praised the tasting menus and the fowl entrees.

CityZen's menu changed frequently, in part due to its emphasis on local and seasonal food and in part because executive chef Ziebold introduced new items. The restaurant usually closes for two or three weeks at the end of August.

=== Closure and replacement ===
The Mandarin Oriental announced that CityZen would close permanently on December 6, 2014. Chef Ziebold left the restaurant to open a new venue in downtown D.C. in spring 2015. Rather than find a new chef, the hotel decided to close CityZen and allow the new chef to create a new restaurant.

CityZen was replaced by Dōgon, an Afro-Caribbean restaurant by chef Kwame Onwuachi. It opened on September 9, 2024.

=== Ratings ===
The AAA gave CityZen five diamonds out of five in 2004. The restaurant maintained that rating every year since, and received five diamonds again in 2014. Forbes Travel Guide (formerly known as Mobil Guide), however, gave CityZen only four stars in 2014.

== Awards and recognitions ==
- Best New Restaurants 2005, Esquire October 2005
- Best New Restaurant of the Year, Restaurant Association of Metropolitan Washington, June 2005
