= Tatiana (disambiguation) =

Tatiana (and a number of other spelling) is a female given name.

Tatiana and variants may also refer to:

- Tatiana by Kwame Onwuachi, restaurant in NYC
- Tatiana, Russian steamer that came to be Polish ORP Admirał Sierpinek
- Tatiana (tiger), a San Francisco zoo animal who maimed and killed before being shot and killed

== See also ==
- Tatian (disambiguation)
- Tatya (disambiguation)
