= Cunanan =

Cunanan is a Hispanized Pampangan surname.

== Notable people ==
- Andrew Cunanan (1969–1997), Filipino-American serial killer
- Emmerie Cunanan, Filipina fashion model
- Lucia Cunanan (1927 or 1928–2008) Filipina restaurateur
- Tom Cunanan, Filipino American chef
