= Bocuse d'Or USA =

Biennial chef championship

The Bocuse d'Or USA is a biennial chef championship, where the winner is selected to represent the U.S. in the international Bocuse d'Or competition. Following 20 years of American representation in the competition, in 2008 Paul Bocuse asked Daniel Boulud to establish a structure for the selection of Team USA, who along with Thomas Keller and Jérôme Bocuse form the Board of Directors of the Bocuse d'Or USA Foundation. The first Bocuse d'Or USA competition was held in September 2008.

The Bocuse d'Or competition is frequently referred to as the culinary equivalent of the Olympic Games.

Following an idea by Boulud, the Bocuse d'Or was applied as the theme of an episode of Top Chef season 6, representing the biggest publicity the event has to date received in the United States.

== Rules ==
To be eligible competitors in Bocuse d'Or USA, the chef applicants must be U.S. citizens and 23 years of age or older at the time of the following international final competition in Lyon, France, and have had at least three years of experience in a fine dining establishment. The chef's assistant, the commis, must be a U.S. citizen and 22 years or younger at the time of the final competition in Lyon. Judges determine the winning team to represent Team USA at the following Bocuse d'Or international competition, and award a trophy and cash prize for the each top three final competition teams. The gold medal comes with a $5,000 prize, the silver medal with $4,000 and the bronze medal with $3,000 in 2010, down from the 2008 prizes set at $15,000, $10,000 and $5,000. Team USA is provided with a 14-months-long training program supervised by the Foundation's Board of Directors, Culinary Council and selected culinary experts, and all direct expenses surrounding the international participation are paid. The training facility is located in Copia in Napa.

The chefs are required to present two dishes, one fish and one meat, to be plated elaborately on both large platters as well as plated portions. Presentation of the plates comprises 50% of the contestant's total score, broken down to 10% for texture and cuisson (perfection in doneness), harmony of flavors, sophistication and creativity. The presentation of elaborate platters counts for 30% of the scores with 10% each attributed to complexity, technical knife skills and originality. The final 20% of the score is kitchen organization, broken down to 10% for the commis performance, 5% for cleanliness and 5% for efficiency in timing.

== Bocuse d'Or USA 2008 ==
At the 2008 competition which took place on September 26 and 27 during the Food and Wine Festival of Epcot, eight teams of chef and commis competed over two days of cook-offs. The judges included Traci Des Jardins, Alain Sailhac, Harmut Handke, Daniel Humm, Gavin Kaysen, David Myers, Patrick O'Connell, Georges Perrier, and Jean-Georges Vongerichten.

The gold medal was won by Timothy Hollingsworth, then a sous-chef at Thomas Keller's restaurant French Laundry, defeating among others Top Chef season 3 winner Hung Huynh. Though Huynh won the "Best Fish Award" and the "Best Meat Award" was given to Kevin Sbraga, the silver medal was awarded to Richard Rosendale, and the bronze medal awarded to Michael Rotondo, also named "most promising chef in the competition", while Adina Guest was named "Best Commis".

Hollingsworth and his commis Guest went on to place sixth at the international Bocuse d'Or 2009, equalling the best U.S. result to date of Hartmut Handke in 2003.

== Bocuse d'Or USA 2010 ==
To allow for longer period of training ahead of the 2011 international finals, the 2010 competition was scheduled to the earlier February 6 date. It was arranged at the Hyde Park campus of The Culinary Institute of America, in a stadium kitchen designed to mimic the conditions in Lyon. In the 2010 format, twelve teams competed to create two elaborate presentations, one featuring salmon and one lamb, each accompanied by five elaborate garnishes in 5½ hours, produced in front a live audience and a panel of judges, including Keller and Boulud, Traci Des Jardins, Alain Sailhac, Timothy Hollingsworth, Grant Achatz, Alan Wong, and Eric Ziebold.

Top Chef season 6 finalist Kevin Gillespie was registered to participate in the event, having won the chance to compete through Top Chef, but ultimately withdrew from the contest on grounds that time constraints would not allow him to adequately prepare. All other contestants were selected by Keller, Boulud and Jérôme Bocuse.

The gold medal winner was James Kent, a sous-chef at Eleven Madison Park, with the silver medal awarded to Luke Bergman and the bronze medal to Christopher Parsons. Jennifer Petrusky won the "Best Fish Award", Percy Whatley, who also participated in 2008, won the "Best Meat Award", and Marcella Ogrodnik was named "Best Commis".

Kent and his commis Tom Allan will go on to represent the U.S. at the Bocuse d'Or 2011. With a top placement in the finals thus far having eluded Team USA, Boulud has stated that the team's current goal is to be as competitive as Norway, to date a leading Bocuse d'Or team second only to the home nation France.

== Bocuse d'Or USA 2012 ==
The Bocuse d'Or USA regional final was arranged on January 28–29, 2012 again at The Culinary Institute of America in Hyde Park, New York. The gold medal was awarded to the veteran competitor Richard Rosendale, ahead of silver medallist Jeffrey Lizotte and bronze medallist William Bradley. The inaugural Commis Competition was won by Rose Weiss. Rosendale and his commis Corey Siegel will represent the U.S. at the Bocuse d'Or in Lyon on January 29–30, 2013.

== Bocuse d'Or USA 2021 ==
In November 2019, the US 2021 team of were announced, with Jeffery Hayashi of Senia (Honolulu) as head chef and William Barrera of Roy's (Honolulu) as commis. The pair beat finalist teams of Scott Muns and Yuta Umeki, who came in second, and Nyesha Arrington and Michael Sansom, who finished third. The competition last over five hours and mimics the actual Bocuse d'Or competition, with a plate competition and a platter competition.
