= Tom Cunanan =

Filipino American chef

- Education: The Art Institute of Washington
- Culinary career
- Current restaurant: Bad Saint
- Award(s) won: 2019 James Beard Foundation Award, Best Chef: Mid-Atlantic

Tom Cunanan is a Filipino American chef in Washington, D.C.

== Early life ==
Cunanan immigrated from the Philippines to the United States at the age of three, growing up in Hyattsville, Maryland as the sixth of seven children. He went to Northwestern High School and through the Boys & Girls Club, he got a job as a dishwasher and bar-back at Corduroy, a restaurant on K Street in Washington, D.C. After high school, he enrolled in the culinary school at The Art Institute of Washington.

== Culinary career ==
Cunanan gained experience in kitchens across D.C., including Jeffrey Buben's Vidalia, Nicholas Stefanelli's Bibiana, and Ardeo + Bardeo, where he was executive sous chef. When Cunanan's mother was diagnosed with cancer in 2012, he worked with her to write down her recipes for Filipino cuisine, forming the basis for a catering business.

In 2014, Cunanan met Filipino American restaurateurs Nick Pimentel and Genevieve Villamora, who were developing plans to open a Filipino restaurant. With the help of a Kickstarter campaign, the three opened Bad Saint in 2015 in the Columbia Heights neighborhood of Washington, D.C.

Bad Saint was recognized by Bon Appétit magazine as one of the best new restaurants in the country in 2016. Pete Wells of The New York Times gave the restaurant a three-star review, writing that "the food that Tom Cunanan and his cooks prepare under columns of wok smoke is richly compelling no matter how many prior run-ins you’ve had with Filipino food." Eater named it one of the 38 essential restaurants in America in 2017.

After being a finalist in 2017 and 2018, Cunanan won the 2019 James Beard Award for Best Chef, Mid-Atlantic.
