= Eric Ziebold =

American chef and restaurateur

- Born: 1972 (age 53–54); Iowa
- Education: University of Northern Iowa
- Culinary career
- Rating: Michelin stars
- Current restaurants: Kinship; Métier
- Previous restaurant: CityZen
- Award won: James Beard Award

Eric Ziebold (born 1972) is an American chef and restaurateur with two Michelin Star restaurants in Washington, D.C., Kinship and Métier. He was executive chef at CityZen from 2004 to 2014, where he won several awards, including a James Beard Award.

== Early years ==
Ziebold, who was born in Iowa, began working in restaurants as a teenager after school at Aunt Maude’s with mentor chef Matt Nichols. Ziebold spent more time in the restaurant than in class while attending college at the University of Northern Iowa, and decided to transfer to the Culinary Institute of America. After spending some time at Wolfgang Puck's Spago in Beverly Hills, California, and Jeffrey Buben's Vidalia in Washington, D.C., in 1996 Ziebold joined Thomas Keller's The French Laundry in the Napa Valley in California, rising to the position of chef de cuisine. Ziebold stayed at The French Laundry until 2003, when he moved briefly to New York City to open Keller's new restaurant, Per Se.

== CityZen ==
Ziebold left New York for Washington, D.C. in early 2004 and opened the critically acclaimed CityZen at the Mandarin Oriental Washington. Ziebold was named one of the "10 most influential chefs working in America" by Forbes in 2007 alongside Dan Barber, Tom Colicchio, and Grant Achatz. CityZen was named best new restaurant of the year by the Restaurant Association of Metropolitan Washington in June 2005.

In 2008, Ziebold won the James Beard Award for Best Chef, mid-Atlantic.

CityZen closed permanently on December 6, 2014, after Ziebold left to open a new venue in downtown D.C. Rather than merely install a new chef, the hotel decided to close CityZen and allow the new chef to create a new restaurant.

== Kinship and Métier ==
Ziebold opened his first independent restaurant in December 2015, named Kinship and located at 1015 7th Street NW in the Mount Vernon Square neighborhood of Washington, D.C. Métier opened in the same building in April 2016.

Kinship has a 55-seat dining room, 27-seat lounge, and 15-seat bar, and the name of the restaurant is explained on each menu: “Kinship, feeling of being close or connected to other people.” The menu is divided into five categories: craft (dishes that highlight a certain cooking technique), history (classics revisited), ingredients (think surf clams or Rohan duck), indulgence (the place to look for truffles and caviar), and “for the table” family-style platters, such as whole fish or a 12-ounce dry-aged ribeye.

Métier is located below Kinship and is accessed by an elevator that opens to a lounge and a small 40-seat dining room where the kitchen and chefs can be seen behind glass. Named for the French word for skill in one's job, Métier features a seven-course menu in an intimate setting.

In the inaugural Michelin Guide for Washington, D.C. in 2016, Kinship received one star. Métier received a Michelin Star in 2017. Washingtonian magazine named Métier the #1 Very Best Restaurant in DC in 2018.

Both Kinship and Metier closed in late 2025.

== Awards ==
- Best New Chefs, Food & Wine, 2005
- Best Chef: Mid-Atlantic, James Beard Foundation, 2008
- Chef of the Year, Restaurant Association of Metropolitan Washington, 2008
- Michelin star, Kinship 2017 to current here
- Michelin star, Métier 2018 to current here
