= France Pavilion at Epcot =

Pavilion of World Showcase in Epcot

France Pavilion

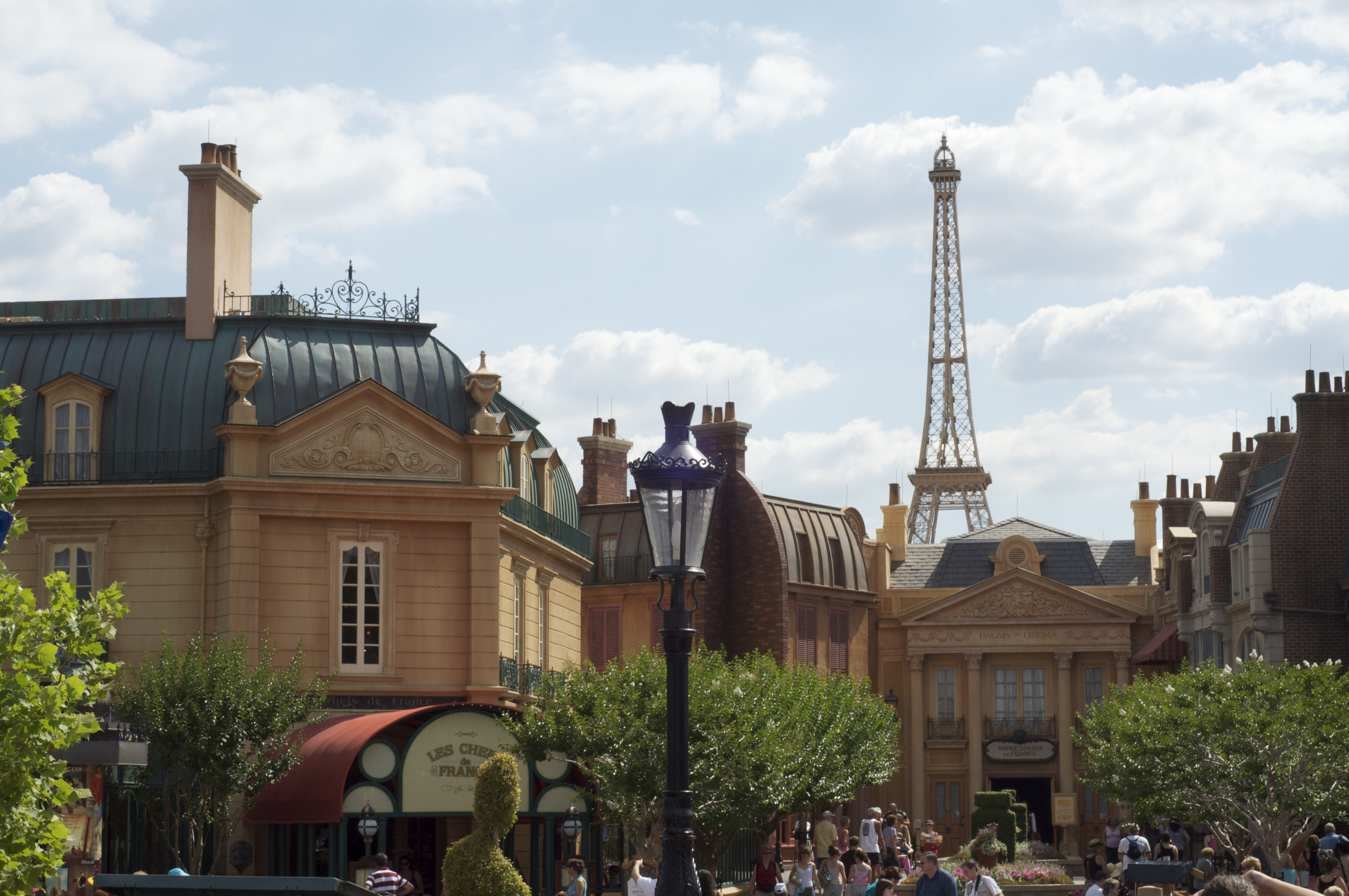

Epcot
- Area: World Showcase
- Coordinates: 28.368936°N 81.552774°W
- Status: Operating
- Opening date: October 1, 1982

Ride statistics
- Attraction type: Themed Pavilion
- Theme: Paris, France

The France Pavilion is a French-themed pavilion that is part of the World Showcase within Epcot at Walt Disney World in Bay Lake, Florida. Its location is between the Morocco and United Kingdom pavilions.

== Layout ==
The France Pavilion is themed to look like a Parisian neighborhood with a pool and fountains and with a view of the Eiffel Tower in the distance. Most of the shops on the streets are actual shops selling French goods such as Guerlain perfume. The attraction effects France's cities and historical structures. It also includes two French restaurants, Monsieur Paul (formerly the Bistro de Paris) and Les Chefs de France; as well as the eateries Les Halles Boulangerie and Patisserie and L'artisan des Glace ice-cream parlour.

== Attractions ==
As with many of the pavilions located within the World Showcase section of the Epcot park, a key aspect of the France Pavilion is its panoramic film Impressions de France. The film, which has been playing since the opening day of the Epcot park in 1982, offers a visual tour of the nation, set against a musical score written by Buddy Baker, encompassing the music of classical French composers such as Claude Debussy and Camille Saint-Saëns. The film itself is the work of director Rick Harper and produced by two-time Academy Award nominee Bob Rogers. The film's visual tour includes some of the nation's most stunning and romantic landmarks such as the cliffs of Étretat in the Haute-Normandie region, Mont Saint-Michel in Normandy, Château de Chambord in the Loire Valley, Notre Dame de Paris and the Eiffel Tower.

The country was previously a participant in the "Kim Possible World Showcase Adventure". The interactive scavenger hunt type attraction, which ran between January 2009 and June 2012, was played across the numerous themed lands of Epcot's "World Showcase". It was replaced by "Agent P's World Showcase Adventure" in June 2012.

On July 15, 2017, Disney announced that Remy's Ratatouille Adventure would be coming to the France Pavilion.

On January 16, 2020, a Beauty and the Beast sing-along show premiered in Palais du Cinéma, which alternates showtimes with Impressions de France. On December 12, 2022, EPCOT announced that the France Pavilion would participate in DuckTales World Showcase Adventure beginning on December 16; the opening date had been postponed since 2020 due to the COVID-19 pandemic.

=== Current attractions ===
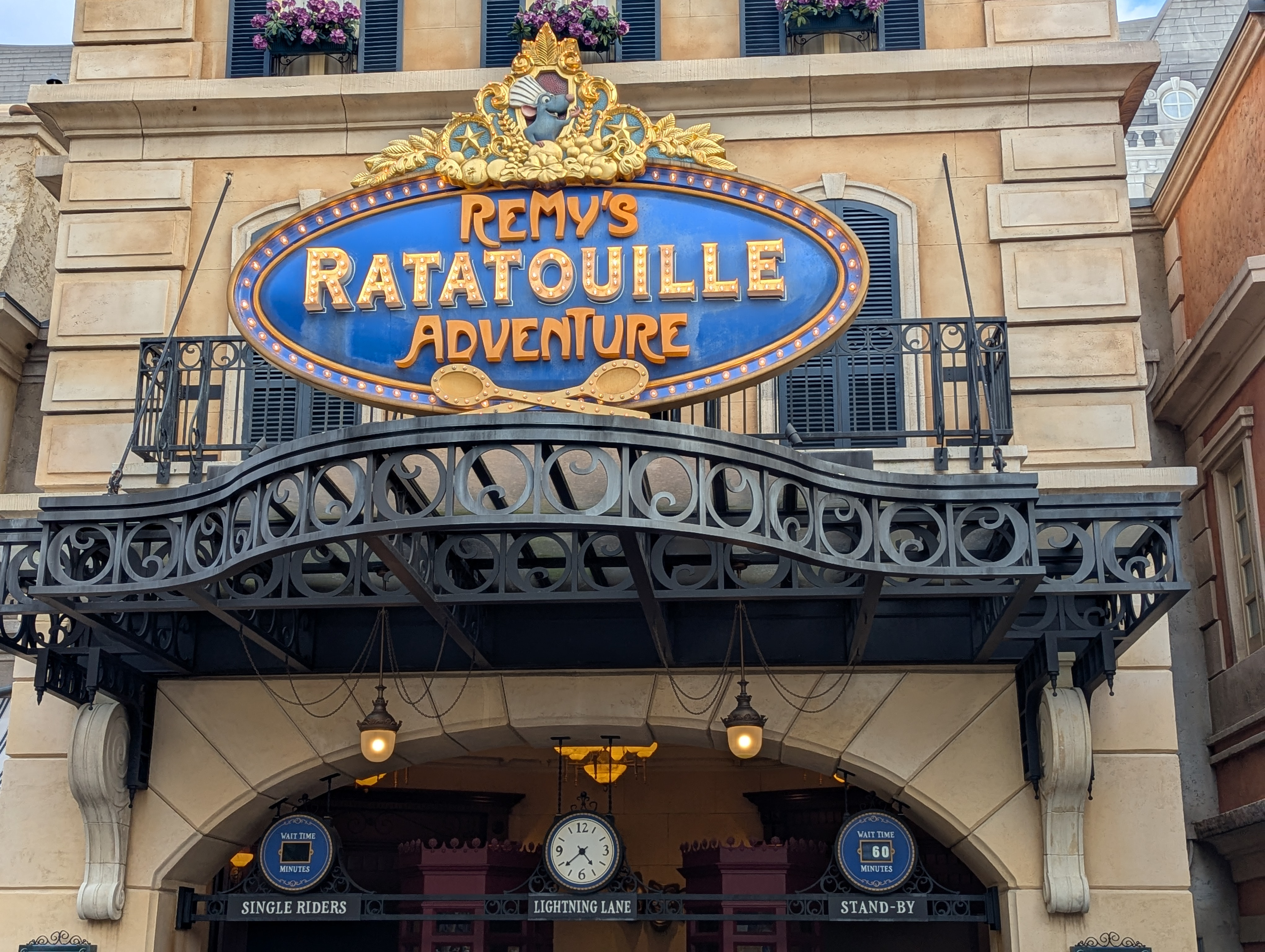
Entrance sign for Remy's Ratatouille Adventure at Epcot

- Palais du Cinéma
  - Impressions de France (1982-present)
  - Beauty and the Beast Sing-Along (2020-present)
- Remy's Ratatouille Adventure (2021-present)
- EPCOT World Showcase Adventure
  - DuckTales World Showcase Adventure (2022-present)

=== Former attractions ===
- EPCOT World Showcase Adventure
  - Kim Possible World Showcase Adventure (2009–2012)
  - Agent P's World Showcase Adventure (2012–2020)

== Street performers and atmosphere ==
Belle and the Beast from the 1991 Disney animated film Beauty and the Beast, Cinderella and Prince Charming from the 1950 Disney animated film Cinderella and Aurora and Prince Philip from the 1959 Disney animated film Sleeping Beauty, meet guests at the France Pavilion. In addition, the comedy chair climbing and balancing show "Serveur Amusant" performs on a daily basis outside Les Chefs de France. Also, adding to the themed land's atmosphere, are advertisements for Disneyland Paris and souvenirs featuring it.

== Dining ==
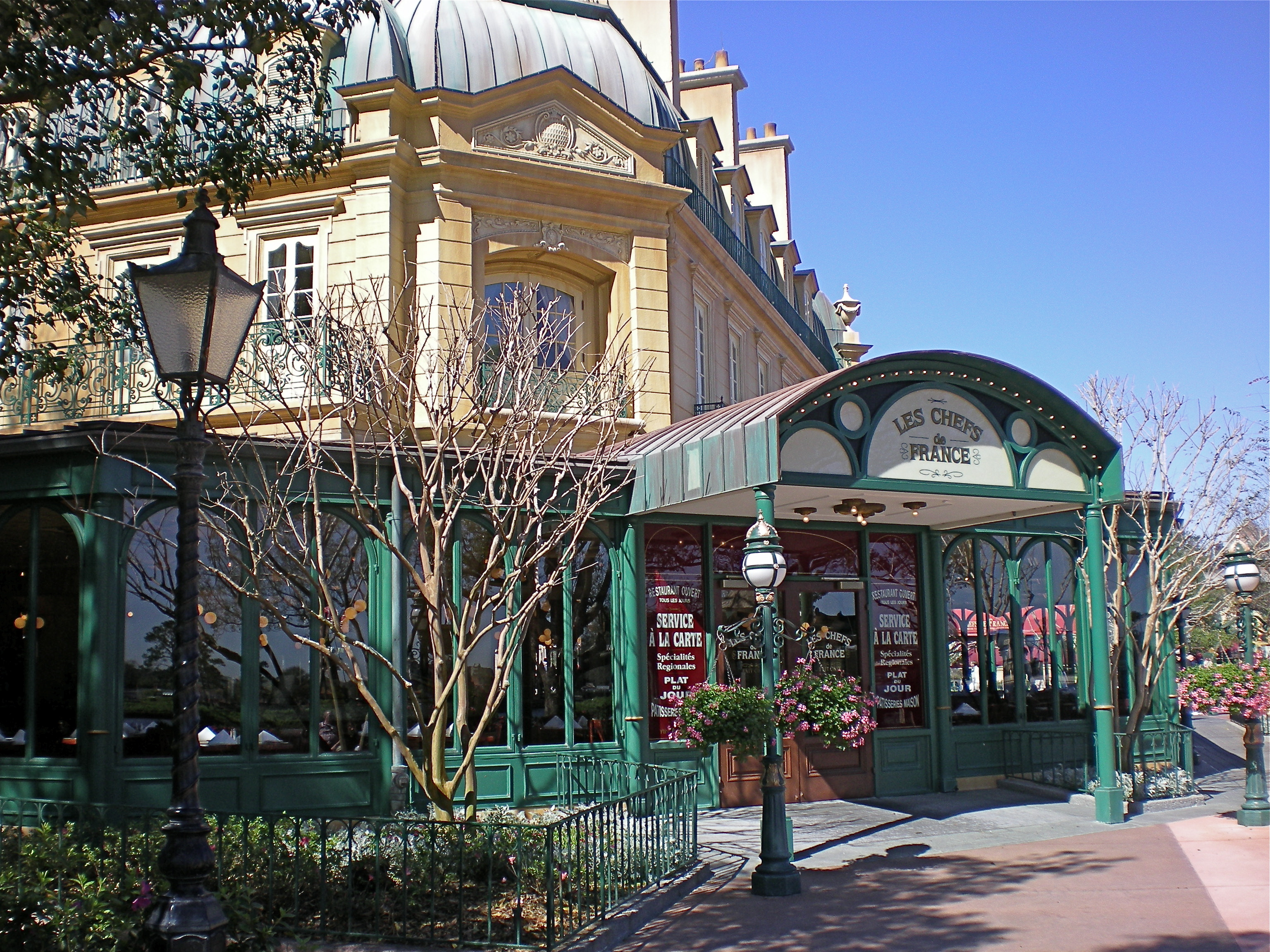
Les Chefs de France

- Les Chefs de France was opened by French gastronomic legends Roger Vergé, Gaston Lenôtre, and Paul Bocuse. It opened at Epcot's inception in 1982 and has been run since 1996 by Bocuse's son Jérôme. In 2009, an Audio-animatronic figure of the rat Remy from the Disney animated feature Ratatouille appeared at the restaurant several times daily. The Rémy figure (which is the smallest created by Walt Disney Imagineering) was brought around by a handler to appear at diners' tables, which was especially apt given that one of the establishment's founders, Gaston Lenôtre, is widely believed to have been part of the inspiration for Auguste Gusteau in the film.
- Les Creperie de France
- Monsieur Paul
- Boulangerie Pâtisserie des Halles
