= Evette Rios =

American bilingual lifestyle expert, writer, television host and designer

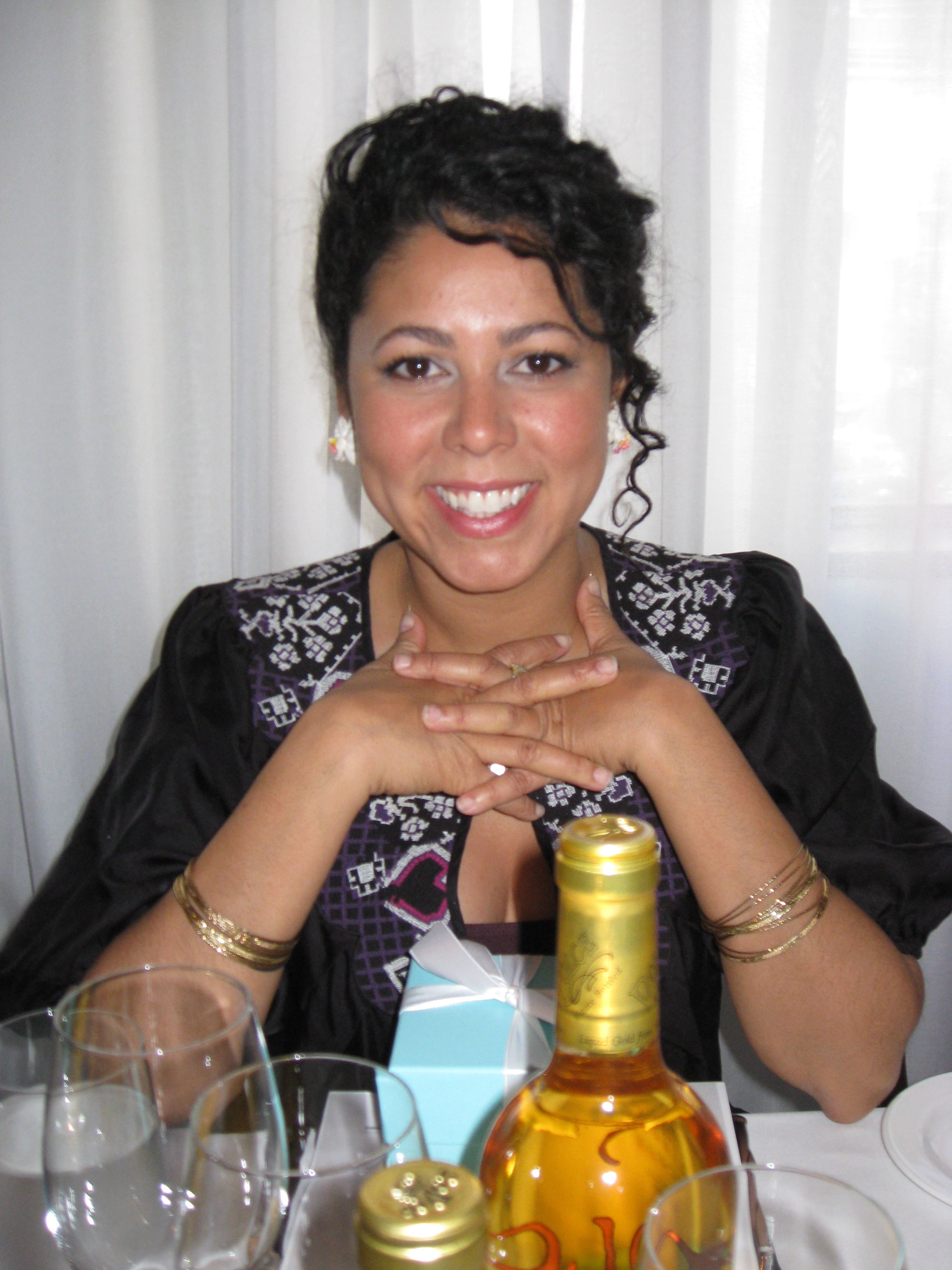
Shooting for DreamQuest with Evette Ríos for the CW Network

Evette Ríos is an American bilingual lifestyle expert, writer, television host, designer and native New Yorker of Puerto Rican heritage.

Ríos is currently the host of a hugely successful Facebook Live series called "Slice", a collaboration with The Little Things, a viral Facebook channel. She has received over 1 million views over her first four 15 minute episodes she also hosted CBS' adaptation of Recipe Rehab, which currently airs on Z Living. Most recently she hosted The Way Home for A&E (TV channel) Networks including FYI (U.S. TV channel), Lifetime (TV network), LMN (TV network) and A&E (TV channel) with Megan Colarossi. Prior to that she hosted DreamQuest with Evette Ríos, which was produced with Litton Entertainment for the CW Network. She served as a guest co-host and field correspondent on ABC's The Chew, where she reports on new food and lifestyle trends around the country. She was a designer on In a Fix on TLC, FreeStyle on HGTV and The G Word on Planet Green.

Evette is a contributing design expert and “buddy” on the Daytime Emmy Award winning Rachael Ray (TV series) and is a regular contributor, in fluent Spanish, to Al Despertar, Tu Desayuno Alegre and Despierta América all on Univision. She has also made guest appearances on The Today Show on NBC, The Early Show and the CW11 Morning Show. She was recently invited by Rachael Ray to be one of her 7 “buddies” on the newly rebranded EHow Food Channel.

She is a contributor to Latina Magazine, Everyday with Rachael Ray Magazine, Siempre Mujer, rachaelray.com and is a contributing editor of BHG.com (Better Homes And Gardens magazine's website) and the face of its annual 100 Days of Holidays program. She contributed a chapter to the best selling book, The Experts Guide To Doing Things Faster published By Clarkson Potter. She also serves as food editor for the Latina lifestyle website Mamiverse.com. and has headlining blogs on Xojane.com and Parade.com.

In July 2012 she became the national spokesperson for Goodwill Industries International.

The December/January 2012 issue of Latina Magazine named Ríos one of the 50 reasons to love being Latina and the "Mobile Martha Stewart". Evette's work on The Chew made her the only Latina on a national daytime talk show.

== Early life and education ==
Evette Ríos is the only child of Nilsa and Francisco Ríos both hailing from Mayagüez, Puerto Rico. She has two older half-brothers Michael and Derrick. She was born and raised in Brooklyn, New York. As a child she and her parents would work together to rehab several homes that they bought and sold in their Bedford-Stuyvesant neighborhood. She was selected to become a member of Prep for Prep in 5th grade which enabled her to attend private schools instead of the area public schools. She was a member of the teen theater group The Sullivan Street Players founded and directed by Gail Noppe-Brandon along with Bobby Lopez, co-writer of Avenue Q and Co-Creator of Book of Mormon, artist Franck De La Mercedes and actress Sarah Paulson. She first attended The Little Red School House in the Greenwich Village area of Manhattan and then went on to The Spence School. After high school she attended Bates College in Lewiston, Maine. There she travelled abroad nearly two years, during her travels she developed a deep love of design, and how culture informs the way we relate to our space. At Bates College she double majored in Biology and Theater. After college she worked for a stint at the American Museum of Natural History, drawing and documenting mollusks found off the coast of New Caledonia with Dr. Paula Mikkelsen. After graduation she attended the Career Discovery Program at the Graduate School of Design at Harvard and did coursework at Parsons School of Design and Fashion Institute of Technology. She worked at top New York interior design and architecture firms, Murphy Burnham and Buttrick, Scott Snyder Inc. and Sheila Bridges Design before getting her start in television.

== Non-profit works ==
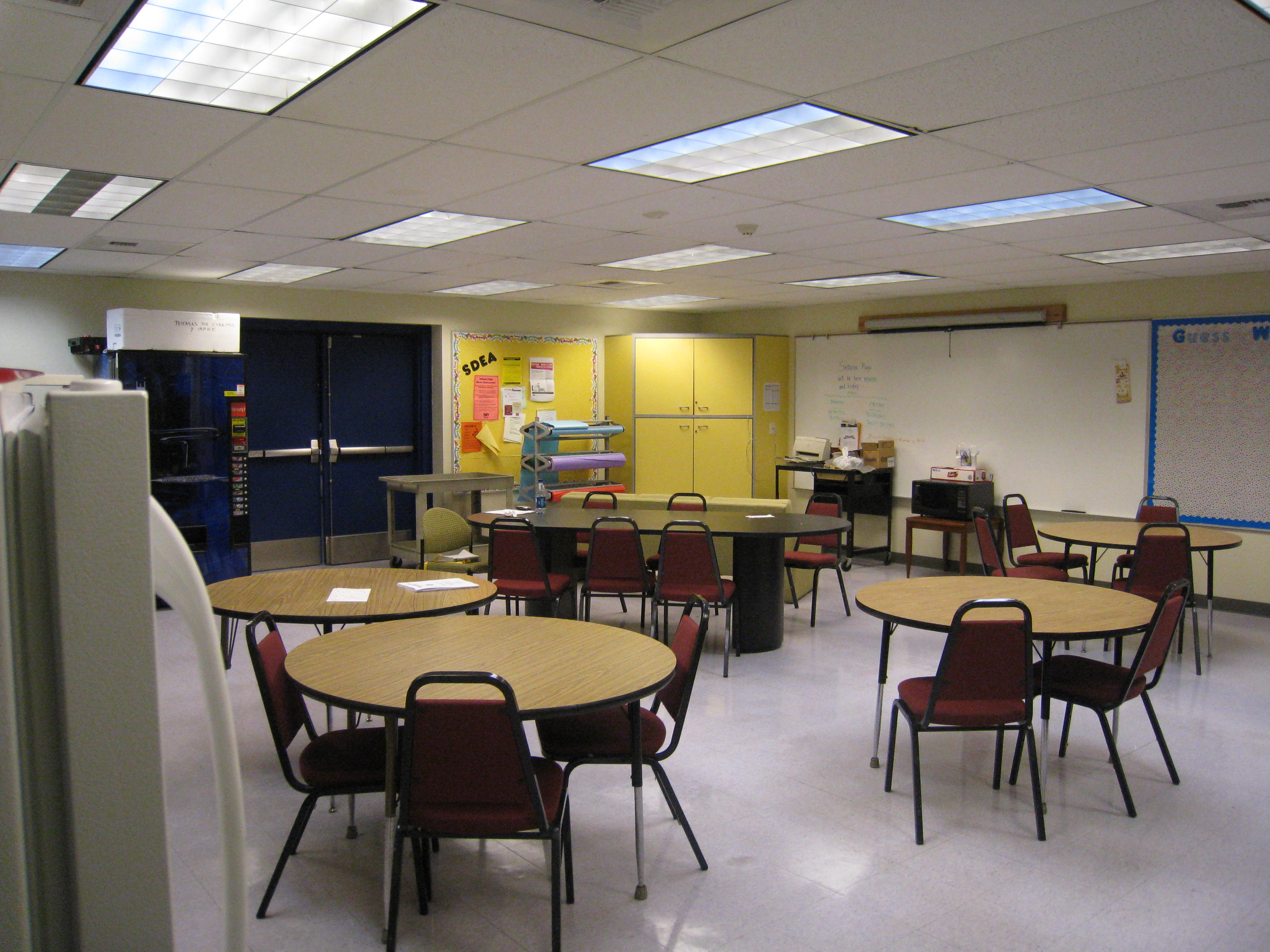
BEFORE Image of Teacher's Lounge at Balboa Elementary, San Diego, California- Outreach to Teach

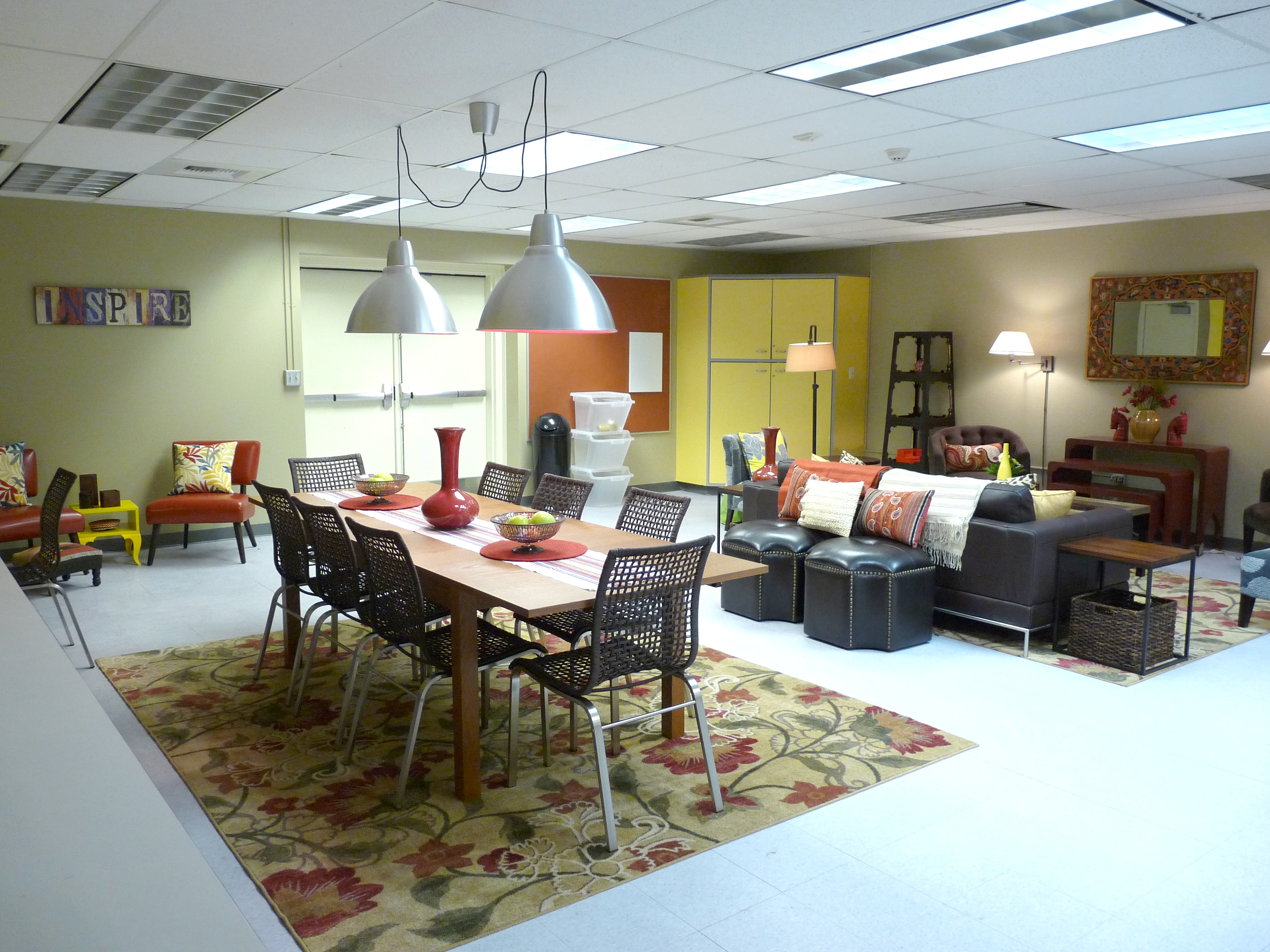
AFTER Image of Teacher's Lounge at Balboa Elementary, San Diego, California - Outreach to Teach

Evette Ríos is National Spokesperson for Goodwill Industries and is on the board of DIFFA, the Design Industries Foundation Fighting AIDS a registered 501(c)(3) that grants funding to some of the country's top providers of services to those living with HIV and AIDS. Other DIFFA board members include Kelly Wearstler, Whoopi Goldberg and David Rockwell. She is Co-Chair of the PR Committee at the Salmagundi Club, one of the oldest Arts club in the Country and a registered 501(c)(3). and served as Co-Chair at the 2013 and 2012 Design on a Dime event alongside Lara Spencer, Genevieve Gorder and Sabrina Soto which benefits Housing Works.

She has worked for several years with the National Education Association's annual volunteer program Outreach to Teach. There she works to rehab and redesign teacher's lounges, in just one day, for schools around the country.

She also has developed recipes for Fidelis Care, a NY State health insurance company to help parents create healthy meals for their children.

== Personal life ==
Evette lives in New York City with her husband, Stephen, her sons, Yagüez "Yago" and Guarionex "Rex", her cat Miss Kitty and her semi-hairless dog Baloo.
