= Impressions de France =

Film attraction at Epcot

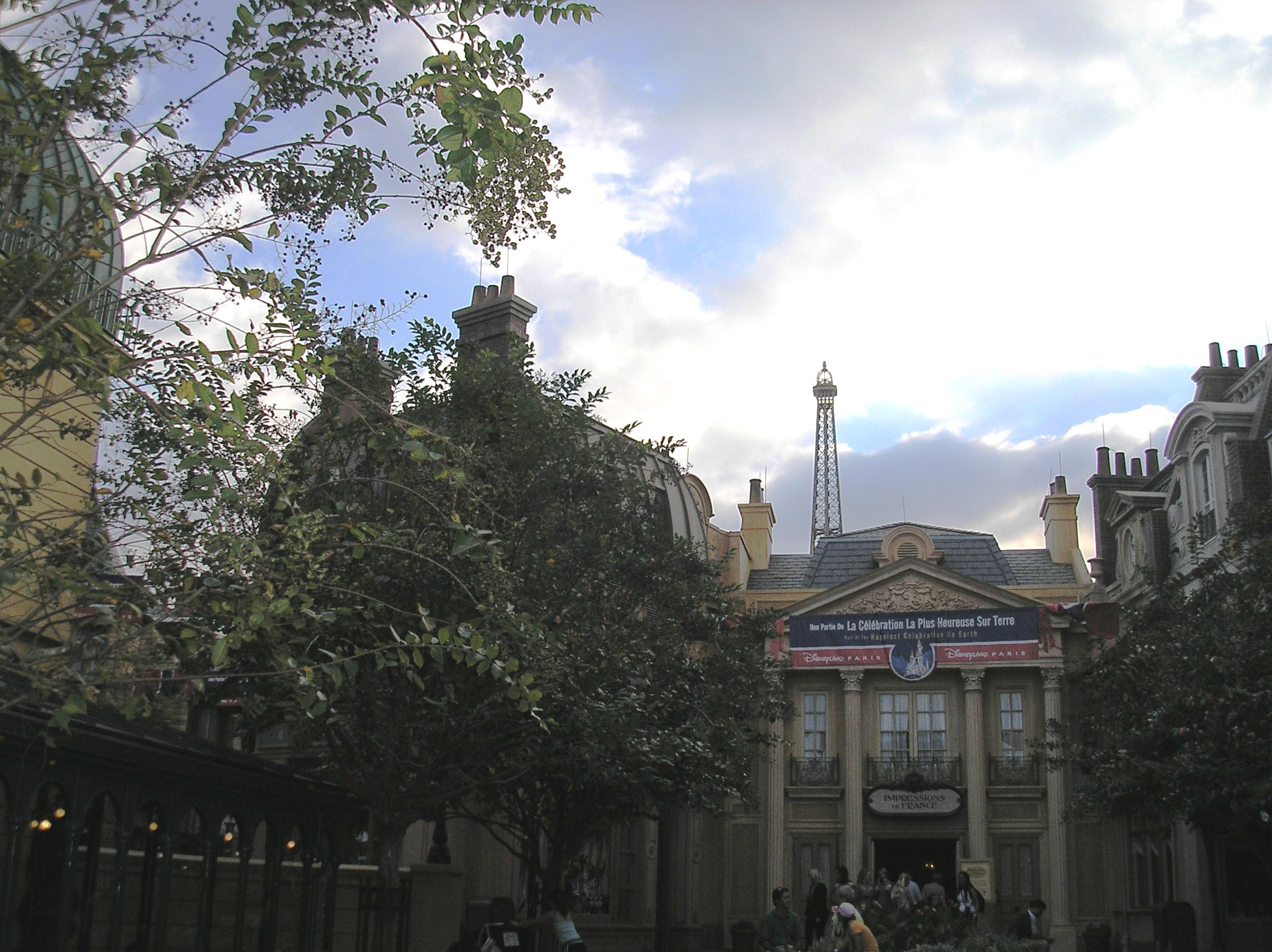

Epcot
- Area: World Showcase (France Pavilion)
- Status: Operating
- Opening date: October 1, 1982

Ride statistics
- Attraction type: Movie Theater
- Designer: WED Enterprises
- Theme: Sights of France
- Music: Arrangement by Buddy Baker; includes works by Boieldieu, Debussy, Offenbach and Saint-Saëns
- Duration: 18:00
- Wheelchair accessible
- Assistive listening available
- Closed captioning available

Impressions de France (Impressions of France) is a documentary film about France and the featured attraction in the France Pavilion of Epcot's World Showcase at Walt Disney World in Florida. The movie is presented in the Palais du Cinéma (Cinema Palace) building and projected onto five adjacent screens, giving 200° coverage and resembling a Cinerama Screen, in which one giant, curved screen stretches so wide that the edges are at the peripheral vision of the average person, unlike Circle-Vision 360° found at the Canada pavilion and the China pavilion.

== Synopsis ==
Impressions de France is one of the original Epcot park attractions, which has been playing every day since the park opened in 1982. It is also recognized by the Guinness World Records as holding the world record for the "longest running daily screening of a film in the same theater." The film sweeps pavilion guests into a tour of the French countryside, major cities, various regions and important structures. Set to a musical score written and arranged by Buddy Baker (composer), the film encompasses the music of classical French composers such as Claude Debussy and Camille Saint-Saëns. The film is the work of director Rick Harper and written and co-produced by two-time Academy Award nominee Bob Rogers. The film's aerial views, mixed with closer views, include, the Eiffel Tower, the Champs-Élysées and the Arc de Triomphe, the French Alps, Versailles, scenes from Cannes, Notre-Dame de Paris and scenes from Normandy. The movie is presented with a lively classical soundtrack and narrated by Claude Gobet.

== Scene list ==
The film showcases 49 locations in France. The areas that appear (in order) in Impressions de France are:

1. The cliffs at Étretat in Normandy
2. Gliding through the Marais Poitevin, a swamp area near La Rochelle
3. Château de Chenonceau; in the Loire Valley, then from the gardens
4. Horsemen and hunting dogs cross the Cheverny Forest
5. Aerial shot of Château de Chambord
6. Flying over the red rooftops up to the bell tower of the church in the Vézelay village
7. Vezelay Church interior, with church bells in the background
8. Horsecart ride through Riquewihr Village near Germany
9. Moving through the market place in Beuvron-en-Auge, Normandy
10. French pastries
11. Wine harvest at the Monbazillac Vineyard
12. Interior of a Cognac cave
13. The Fountain of Apollo at Versailles
14. The Palace of Versailles Garden
15. The Versailles building and the Hall of Mirrors
16. Flying over Castle Beynac in the Dordogne Valley
17. Man chopping wood with Chateau Montpoupon
18. La Roque - Gageac in the Dordogne Valley (bicyclists)
19. Chateau Montpoupon, bicyclists racing toward us
20. Bugatti race cars in Cannes
21. Hot air balloons take off near Chaumont Castle on the Loire river
22. Hot air balloons in front of the cliff city of Rocamadour
23. French Alps in the spring
24. Mountain climbers on rocky peaks in Chamonix (French Alps)
25. Skiers in Chamonix
26. La Rochelle Harbor
27. On board a Brittany fishing boat at sea
28. Fishing boats on the rocky beach of Etretat in Normandy
29. Mont Saint-Michel
30. Interior of Notre-Dame-de-Penhors church in Pouldreuzic, Brittany
31. Wedding reception in full swing at a Brittany farm to traditional Brittany folk music
32. Couple walks along the cliffs of Normandy in Étretat
33. The cliff city of Bonifacio, Corsica
34. Villefranche near Nice
35. Calanque cliffs near Cassis
36. Pier in front of the Carlton Hotel in Cannes
37. Cannes Harbor at twilight
38. Racing along railway tracks in the small Lozère town of Chapeauroux next to the Allier River
39. Gare du Nord (North rail station) in Paris
40. Champs-Élysées at twilight featuring the Arc de Triomphe
41. Seine River in Paris
42. Notre Dame de Paris
43. Through the archways at the Louvre, the Republican Guard
44. Eiffel Tower
45. Aerial shot of Étretat Cliffs
46. Aerial shot of the Pyrenées of Cirque de Gavarnie
47. Aerial shot of Château de Chambord
48. Aerial shot of French Alps near Mont Blanc
49. Finale - Eiffel Tower

== Soundtrack ==
Buddy Baker arranged the film score, and he conducted the Royal Philharmonic Orchestra at Abbey Road Studios. The soundtrack was recorded digitally with a Sony prototype recorder, and Impressions de France became the first movie with a digital soundtrack from beginning to end.

Rick Harper made the initial selections of French music for the movie. Regarding the inspiration for his musical choices, Harper said:

I grew up being exposed to a lot of great music. My mother is a fantastic musician and pianist, and when I was in grade school, she would take me out of school to go the San Francisco opera and symphony. I built a classical music collection of records starting from when I was about 6 years old. I was really familiar with music from the Romantic era and primarily French music. It's almost in my DNA. Even to this day, that's the music of my preference.

A listing of the movie's score from official and unofficial sources:

Scene 1
"Syrinx" * (0:00-0:33)

by Claude Debussy
Solo for Flute by Eddie Beckett of the London Symphony Orchestra

Scenes 2 - 4
"Aquarium" from The Carnival of the Animals * (0:33-1:52)

by Camille Saint-Saëns

Scenes 5 - 6
"Rondeau (Allegro agitato)" from Concerto in C for Harp and Orchestra * (1:52-2:52)

by François-Adrien Boïeldieu

Scenes 8 - 9
original music

by Buddy Baker

Scene 10
original music

by Buddy Baker

Scenes 11 & 12
original music

by Buddy Baker

Scenes 13 - 15
original music

by Buddy Baker

Scene 16
"Nuages" from Nocturnes

by Claude Debussy

Scene 17
original music

by Buddy Baker

Scenes 18 - 20
"Ouverture" from Gaîté Parisienne * (2:52-3:38)

by Jacques Offenbach
original 6 second introduction by Buddy Baker

Scenes 21 - 22
"Lever du jour" from Part 3 of Daphnis et Chloé Suite #2

by Maurice Ravel

Scenes 23 & 24
"Clair de Lune" from Suite bergamasque (Orchestral Arrangement) * (3:38-4:51)

by Claude Debussy

Scene 25
"Trois Gymnopedies #1" * (4:51-5:25)

by Erik Satie
orchestrated by Debussy

Scene 26
original music

by Buddy Baker

Scene 27 & 28
original music

by Buddy Baker

Scene 29
"Aquarium" from Carnival of the Animals

by Camille Saint-Saëns
flute arrangement by Buddy Baker

Scene 30
original music

by Buddy Baker

Scene 31
source music (traditional Brittany folk music)

final bars arranged and adapted by Buddy Baker

Scene 32
original music

by Buddy Baker

Scenes 33 - 35
original music

by Buddy Baker

Scenes 36 & 37
original music

by Buddy Baker

Scenes 38 - 40
"Finale" from Carnival of the Animals * (5:25-6:25)

by Camille Saint-Saëns

Scenes 41 & 42
original music * (6:25-7:07)

by Buddy Baker

Scene 42
"Allegro moderato" from Gaite Parisienne * (7:07-7:22)

by Jacques Offenbach

Scene 43
"Fanfare" from La Peri * (7:22-7:59)

by Paul Dukas

Scene 44 - 49
"Maestoso - Allegro" from the 2nd movement of Symphony no. 3 (Organ Symphony) * (7:59-9:51)

by Camille Saint-Saëns

The selections marked with * can be found on these albums:

- Walt Disney World Resort: The Official Album (1999)
- Walt Disney World Resort: Official Album (2000)
- Official Album: Walt Disney World Resort Celebrating 100 Years of Magic (2001)
- Official Album: The Happiest Celebration on Earth – Walt Disney World Resort Album
- Official Album: Where Magic Lives – Walt Disney World Resort
- Four Parks - One World: Walt Disney World Official Album (2008)

== Additions ==
On January 17, 2020, the Palais du Cinéma theatre began its new schedule, which involves alternating between showing Impressions de France and a Beauty and the Beast sing-along.
