= Richard Rosendale =

American chef

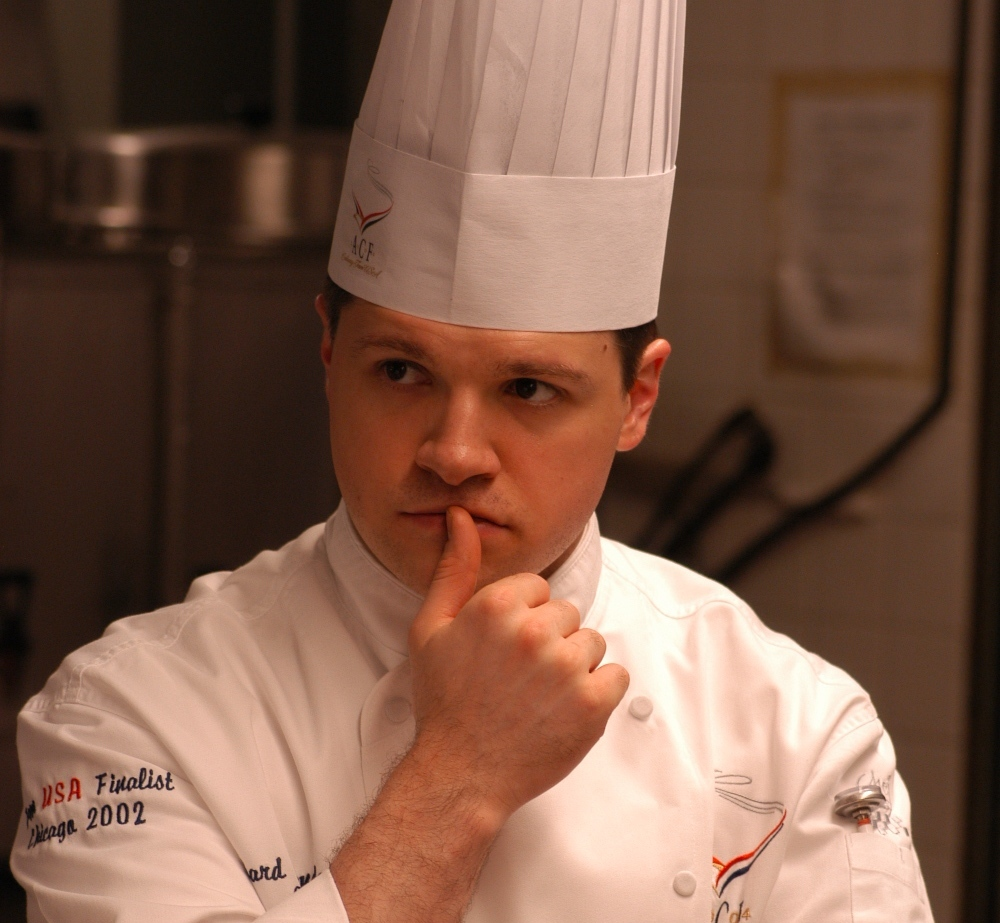
Richard Rosendale CMC

Richard Rosendale is an American chef. He was the U.S. candidate selected to perform at the international Bocuse d'Or 2013 in France.

== Career ==
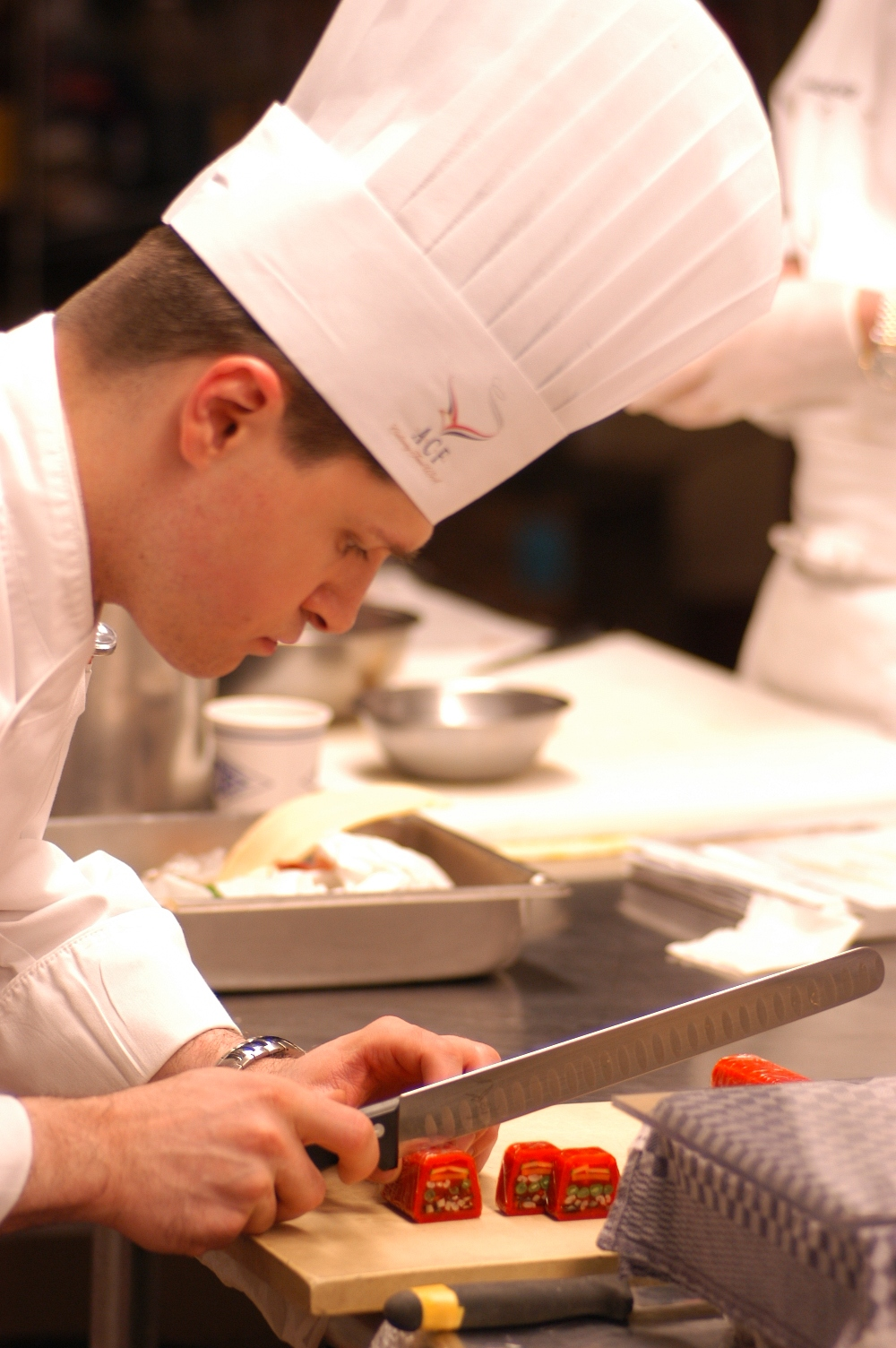
Richard Rosendale CMC cutting Vegetable Terrine

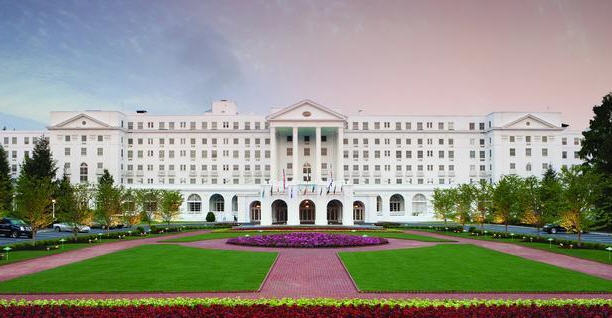
Greenbrier Resort Hotel

Richard Rosendale was the youngest member of ACF Culinary Team USA since the team's inception, and was one of five chefs who represented the U.S. in the 2004 World Culinary Olympics in Erfurt, Germany. The team ranked number one in the world for the hot kitchen, beating 32 other nations.

Chef Rosendale trained in several kitchens across the United States and mentored under several Certified Master Chefs including Peter Timmins CMC, Hartmut Handke CMC, as well as worked under Laurence McFadden CMC former Corporate Chef for the Ritz Carlton Organization in Amelia Island.

Rosendale has been featured on several TV Food Network Specials. Rosendale has amassed over 48 national and international medals, including a perfect score at the international level. Rosendale was also awarded the Presidential Medallion by the American Culinary Federation for his contributions to the Culinary Arts and was named the 2005 ACF Chef of the Year. Chef Magazine has referred to him as “A New Breed of American Chefs,” an amalgam of different generations and philosophies from within the industry. Also, he is the former Chef De Cuisine of the Tavern Room Restaurant at the Greenbrier Resort in White Sulphur Springs, West Virginia. The restaurant received several accolades and awards under his direction. His duties there also included assisting in the supervision of a culinary staff of 165 chefs and 2,000 employees. Rosendale is a certified professional ice carver. He has carved pieces ranging from 1 to 50 block creations. During his career, he has also cooked for several celebrities and supervised meals for U.S. Congress and the President of the United States.

In 2006 Rosendale was appointed Team Captain of the 2008 ACF Culinary Olympic Team USA. The team earned three gold medals.

In 2007, Rosendale opened the restaurant Rosendales in Columbus, Ohio in a newly renovated and historical building in the Short North Arts District. Receiving national, regional and local attention for its modern American cuisine, Rosendales was critically acclaimed, featured in The New York Times Magazine, and regionally named Best New Restaurant.<refname="portfolio"/> Rosendale opened his second operation in Columbus, Details Mini-Bar and Lounge in late 2008. When selected as Executive Chef at the Greenbrier, Richard Rosendale was the youngest to be appointed to the position in the resort's 200-year history.

In September 2009 Rosendale returned to The Greenbrier in White Sulphur Springs, West Virginia, where he was appointed Executive Chef. In 2010, Rosendale attained the top level of U.S. chef certification, the Master Chef Title, following a 130-hour cooking exam covering all aspects of cuisine.

Richard Rosendale is one of the chefs on Recipe Rehab.

In February 2019, Richard Rosendale started Rosendale Events, a full-service catering and events company based out of Atlanta.

=== Bocuse d'Or ===
Rosendale was chosen as one of eight US finalists from candidates across the country in the Bocuse d'Or USA semi-finals in 2008. He won $10,000 and the silver medal and was commended for his progressive technique with sous vide.

In January 2012, Chef Rosendale won the gold medal at the Bocuse d'Or USA competition at the Culinary Institute of America in Hyde Park, N.Y. and the selection to represent team USA in the international Bocuse d'Or finals. Rosendale and his commis, Corey Siegel, a 21-year-old senior apprentice at the Greenbrier, competed at the Bocuse d'Or in Lyon, France, on January 29 and 30, 2013.

The Greenbrier Resort built an underground kitchen expressly for the use of Richard Rosendale and his team for the event at the Bocuse d'Or in Lyon France.
