= Jérôme Bocuse =

French chef

Jérôme Bocuse is a French chef. He is the son of the Nouvelle Cuisine pioneer Paul Bocuse (1926–2018).

== Education ==
Bocuse is a 1992 graduate of The Culinary Institute of America.

== Bocuse d'Or ==
Since 1993 involved in organising the International Bocuse d'Or, Jérôme Bocuse is on the board of directors of the Bocuse d'Or USA Foundation as vice-president. Along with chefs Thomas Keller and Daniel Boulud, Jérôme Bocuse is responsible for raising support and awareness for the U.S. Bocuse d'Or effort, and in selecting the candidates who participate in the Bocuse d'Or USA, where the winner will go on to represent the U.S. in the international finals of Bocuse d'Or in Lyon, France. Since 1996 he runs the "Les Chefs de France" (which was co-founded by his father Paul) a French restaurant at Epcot. In 2009 he appeared as a guest judge on Top Chef.

== See also ==
- Paul Bocuse
- L'Auberge du Pont de Collonges
- Bocuse d'Or
- Bocuse d'Or USA
- Nouvelle cuisine
