= Recipe Rehab =

American cooking competition television program

- Genre: Cooking show
- Presented by: Daniel Boome (season 1); Evette Rios (seasons 2–3)
- Starring: Web series: Daniel Boome; Laura Vitale; Mareya Ibrahim; Govind Armstrong; Spike Mendelsohn; Television series: Calvin Harris (season 1); Candice Kumai (season 1); Tana Amen (season 1); Scott Leibfried (season 1); Richard Rosendale (seasons 2–3); Vikki Krinsky (seasons 2–3)
- Judges: Various families
- Country of origin: United States
- Original language: English
- No. of seasons: Web series: 1 Television program: 3

Production
- Executive producers: Dave Morgan; Peter Sniderman; Mark Koops; Eric Day; Ben Wolin; Veronica Brooks; Sheva Mokarram
- Camera setup: Multi-camera
- Running time: Web series: 8 minutes Television program: 30 minutes
- Production companies: Everyday Health; Trium Entertainment

Original release
- Network: YouTube
- Release: April 2, 2012 – 2012
- Network: ABC
- Release: 2012 – 2013
- Network: CBS
- Release: 2013 – July 25, 2015

Recipe Rehab is an American cooking competition television program that originally debuted as a short-form web series on YouTube on April 2, 2012, and subsequently became a half-hour television series on October 6, 2012 as part of the ABC station-primarily syndicated Litton's Weekend Adventure block. As such, it was the first web series produced as a YouTube original program to become a weekly network television series. Since September 28, 2013, Recipe Rehab has aired on CBS as part of Litton's CBS Dream Team Saturday morning block; first-run episodes continued to air until July 25, 2015, with reruns airing until September 26. The television program is designed to meet educational programming requirements defined by the Federal Communications Commission.

== Format ==
The program features healthy lifestyle and competition elements, with each episode featuring two competing chefs who each develop their own healthier versions of the featured family's recipe. The winning dish is determined by a panel of certified nutritionists (as of the 2014–15 season, Stephanie Clarke and Willow Jarosh, both registered dietitians with master's degrees in science) and the family featured in the given episode. Each dish is rated on a categorical score from 1 to 10, based on the total percentage of total fat, saturated fat, cholesterol, sugar and sodium content reduced in the "rehabbed" recipe in comparison to the original; the ease and length of preparation between the two "rehabbed" recipes (both categories are determined by the nutritionist panel); and the taste of the healthier dish (which is determined by the family). These scores are combined into the maximum cumulative score of 30, determining the chef with the episode's winning recipe.

The YouTube format was an eight-minute program featuring two of three chefs – Daniel Boome, Laura Vitale and Mareya Ibrahim – who alternated depending on the episode. The television version is a 30-minute format, which initially saw Boome reassigned to hosting duties with three new chefs – Calvin Harris, Candice Kumai and Tana Amen – being brought into the rotation. After the show moved from Litton's Weekend Adventure to the CBS Dream Team in 2013, the program became hosted by Evette Rios, with Richard Rosendale and Vikki Krinsky serving as the competing chefs. Episodes also feature multiple-choice trivia questions at the end of the first and, in some episodes, second segments regarding a particular element of nutritional value, as well as "food fact" graphics at the bottom of the screen during the preparation segments that pertain to the nutritional value, origins and uses of a particular ingredient used in the recipes.

Both formats show the preparation of each dish by the two chefs – who are given either 45 or 60 minutes to prepare the dish depending on the ease of the individual recipe, with the segments condensed due to time constraints – during each episode; the preparation segments encompass the first two segments of the television format. In the television format, the third segment features the family preparing the dish with the ingredients and certain food preparation utensils used in the chef's recipes (which are delivered in separate red- and yellow-colored boxes – individually colored to define each chef's recipe – which also contain tablet computers pre-programmed with the instructions for both recipes as well as nutritional fact comparisons between the original recipe and the "rehabbed" red and yellow recipes).

Deviating from the regular competition format, the television version occasionally features special "ask the chef" episodes, featuring questions submitted to one of the chefs by the children of various families that have participated in past and upcoming episodes during the taping of the at-home cooking segments about healthy food alternatives, and demonstrations of recipes preparable in approximately ten minutes.

== History ==
Recipe Rehab was first launched on YouTube on April 2, 2012 as a co-production of Everyday Health and Trium Entertainment, with the initial episodes made available on the video sharing website's Everyday Health channel. The program was one of several web series directly funded by YouTube as a part of its initiative to provide premium original video content. Everyday Health wanted to move Recipe Rehab to broadcast television to allow cross-promotion between the two versions, and entered into a partnership with Litton Entertainment to produce the show as a television series.

Upon its debut on October 6, 2012, the television version of the show initially aired on Litton's Weekend Adventure (a syndicated educational programming block produced by Litton for ABC's owned-and-operated stations and affiliates), replacing a self-titled series produced by Everyday Health on the block's now-defunct "Health and Wellness Hour" (consisting of health and culinary programs that filled the block's third hour during its first three seasons); this version expanded the program's format to 30 minutes. An executive for Everyday Health indicated that it was expected that Recipe Rehab would earn more revenue from product placements and similar arrangements than from advertising sales.

Litton moved Recipe Rehab from Weekend Adventure to the CBS Dream Team (an educational program block formed through a time-lease agreement with Litton to program CBS' children's programming time period on Saturday mornings) upon the block's launch on September 28, 2013, for the series' second television season. Recipe Rehab was among the two programs (along with All In) that were not included on the CBS Dream Team's fall 2015 schedule when it was announced on July 30, 2015 (five days after the last episode of the series aired).
