= Collonges-au-Mont-d'Or =

Collonges-au-Mont-d'Or Colonges (Arpitan)
- Commune
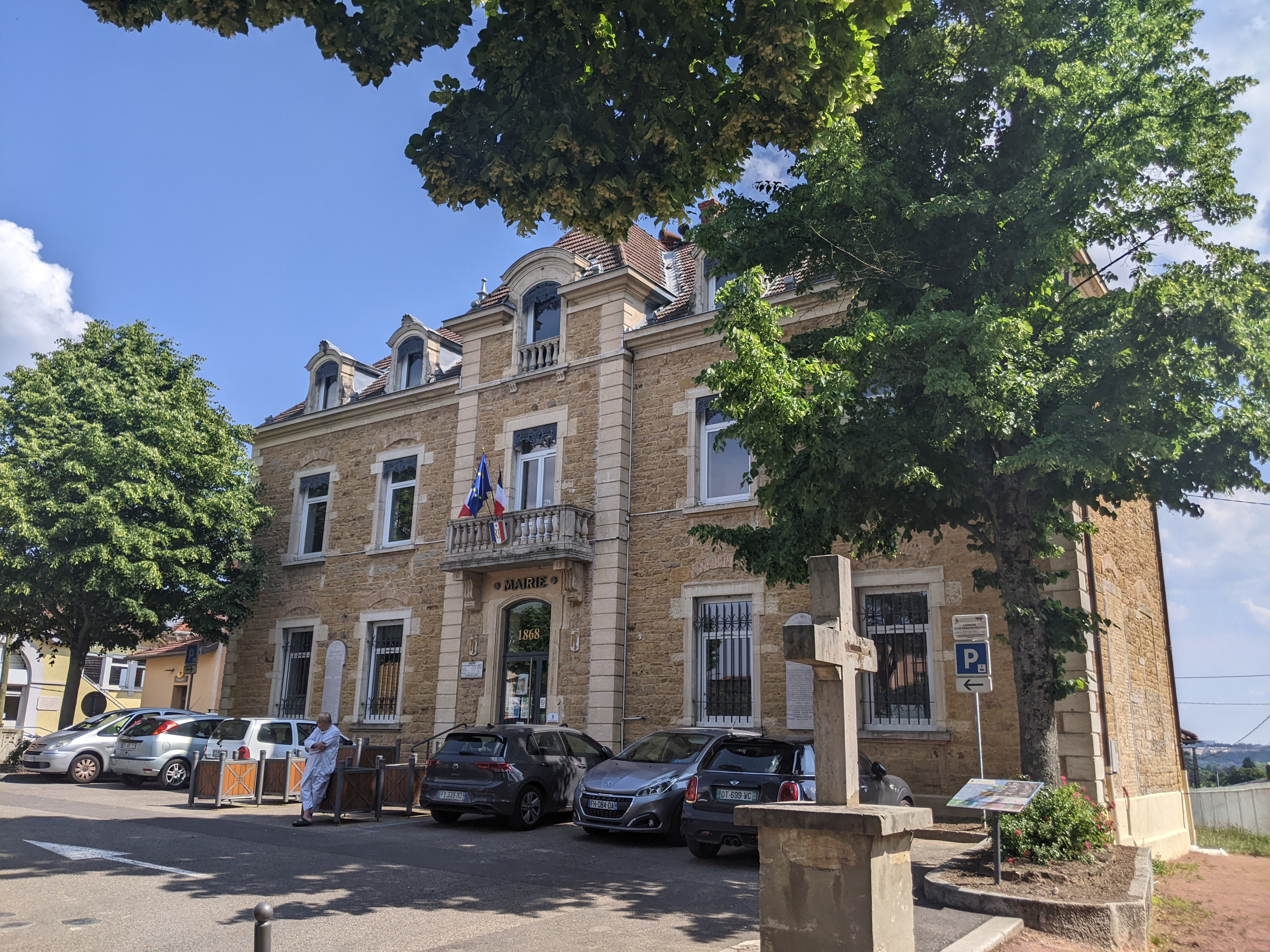
- Collonges-au-Mont-d'Or Town Hall

- Coat of arms
- Location of Collonges-au-Mont-d'Or
- Location within France Location within Auvergne-Rhône-Alpes
- Coordinates: 45°49′26″N 4°50′24″E
- Country: France
- Region: Auvergne-Rhône-Alpes
- Metropolis: Lyon Metropolis
- Arrondissement: Lyon

Government
  - Mayor (2020–2026): Alain Germain
- Area^{1}: 3.78 km^{2} (1.46 sq mi)
- Elevation: 175 m (574 ft)
- Highest elevation: 360 m (1,180 ft)
- Lowest elevation: 165 m (541 ft)
- Population (2023): 4,669
  - Density: 1,240/km^{2} (3,200/sq mi)
- Demonym: Collongeards
- Time zone: UTC+01:00 (CET)
  - Summer (DST): UTC+02:00 (CEST)
- INSEE/Postal code: 69063 /69660
- Website: collongesaumontdor.fr
- ^{1} French Land Register data, which excludes lakes, ponds, glaciers > 1 km^{2} (0.386 sq mi or 247 acres) and river estuaries.

Collonges-au-Mont-d'Or (French pronunciation: [kɔlɔ̃ʒ o mɔ̃dɔʁ]; Arpitan: Colonges) is a commune in the Metropolis of Lyon, Auvergne-Rhône-Alpes region, central-eastern France. It is situated just north of Lyon, on the right bank of the Saône, also comprising roughly the southern half of Île Roy (Roy Island), the northern part being part of Fontaines-sur-Saône.

It is the site of L'Auberge du Pont de Collonges, the restaurant of chef Paul Bocuse (1926–2018).

== Transport ==
The town is served by Collonges-Fontaines station on the Paris–Marseille railway.

== Demographics ==
Historical population
Year	Pop.	±% p.a.
1968	2,662	—
1975	2,786	+0.65%
1982	2,824	+0.19%
1990	3,165	+1.44%
1999	3,420	+0.86%
2007	3,849	+1.49%
2012	3,860	+0.06%
2017	4,052	+0.98%
2023	4,669	+2.39%
Source: INSEE

== Gallery ==
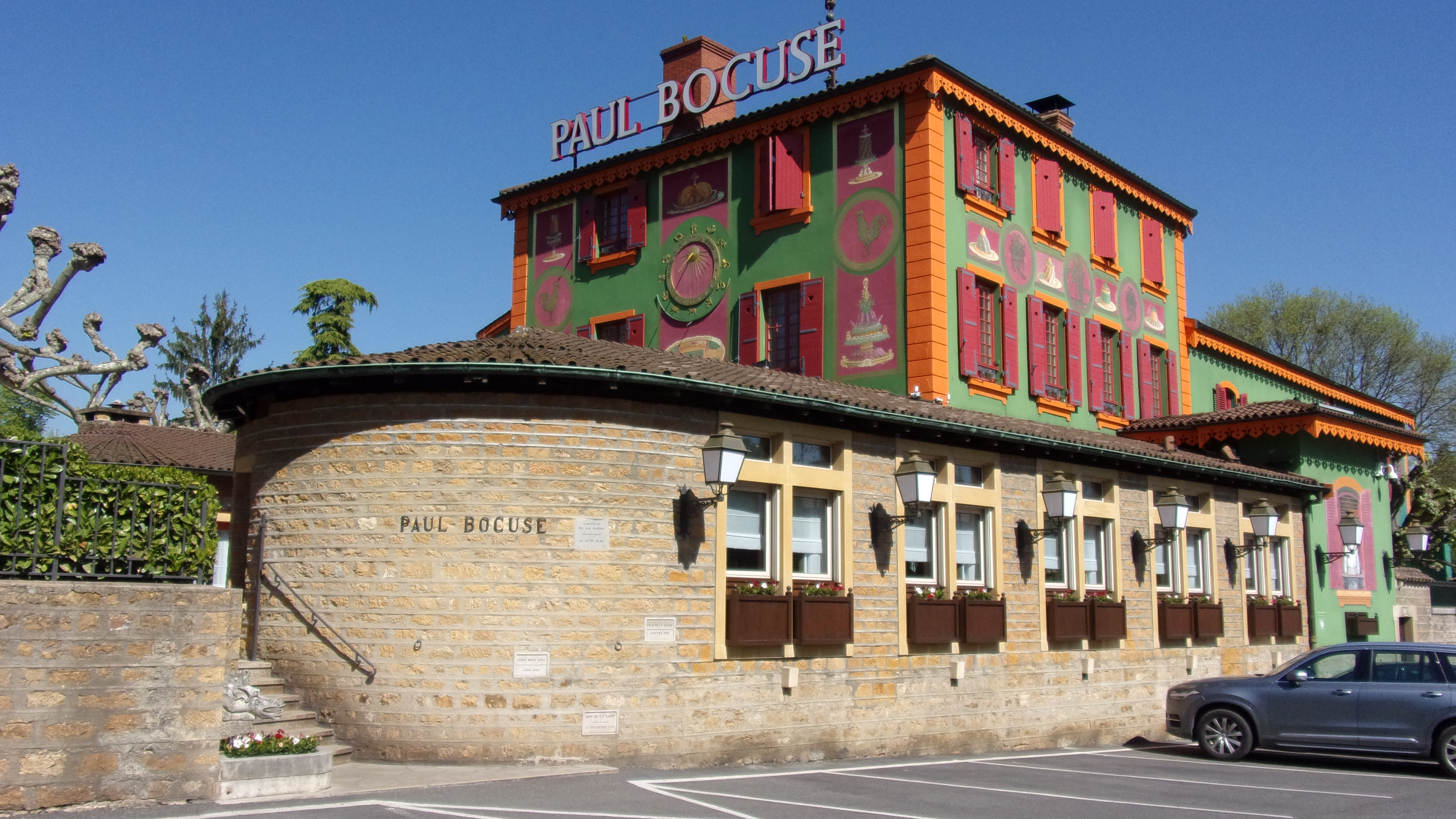
L'Auberge du Pont de Collonges

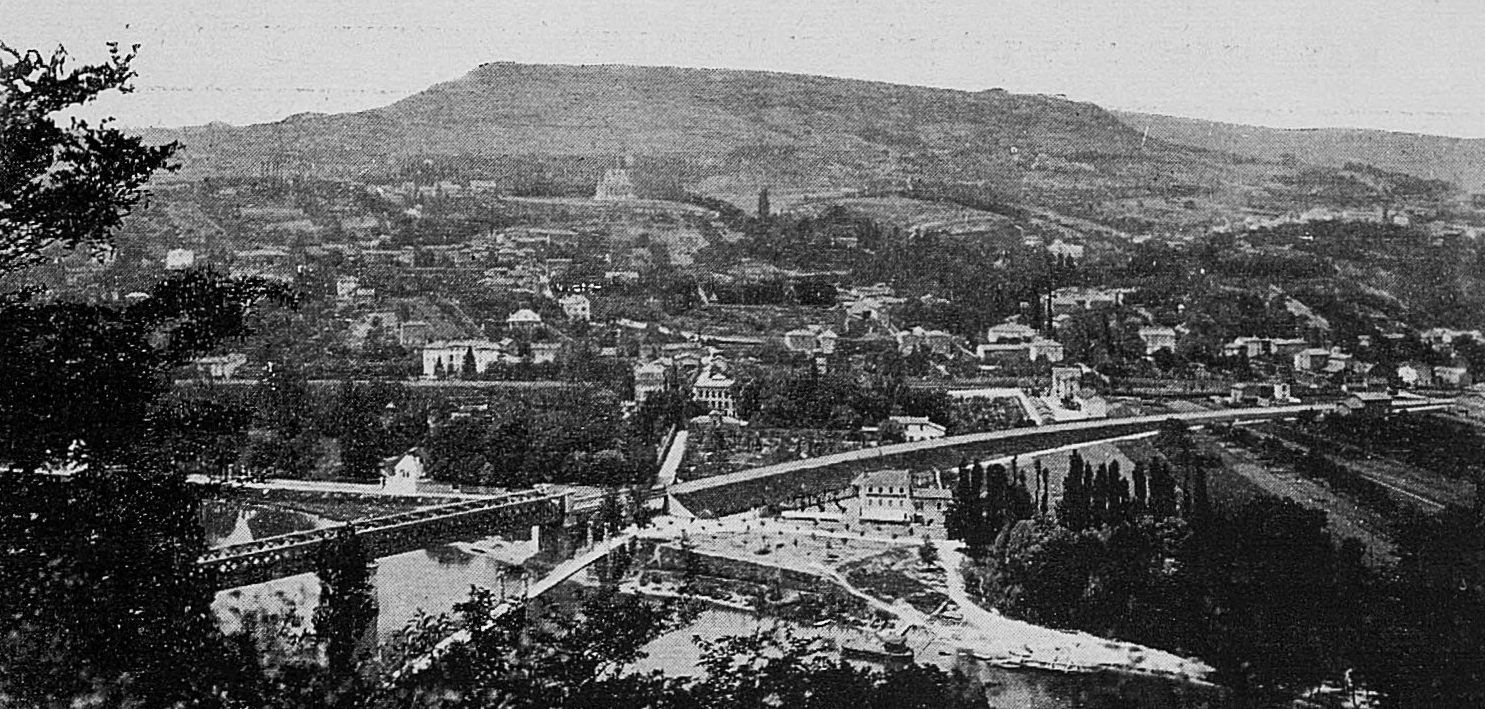
The town seen in the early 20th century, with L'Auberge du Pont de Collonges in the foreground

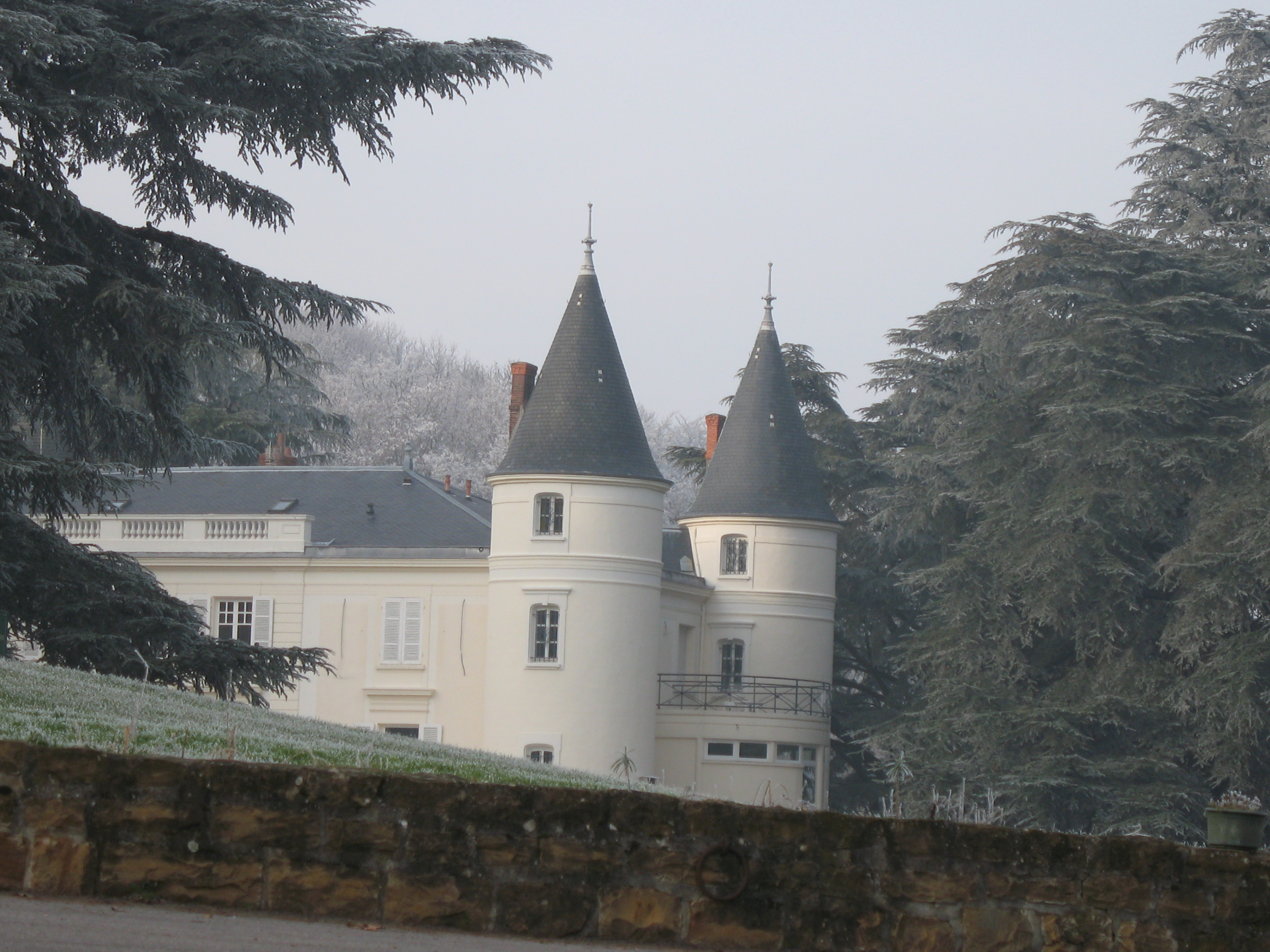
Château de Tourvéon

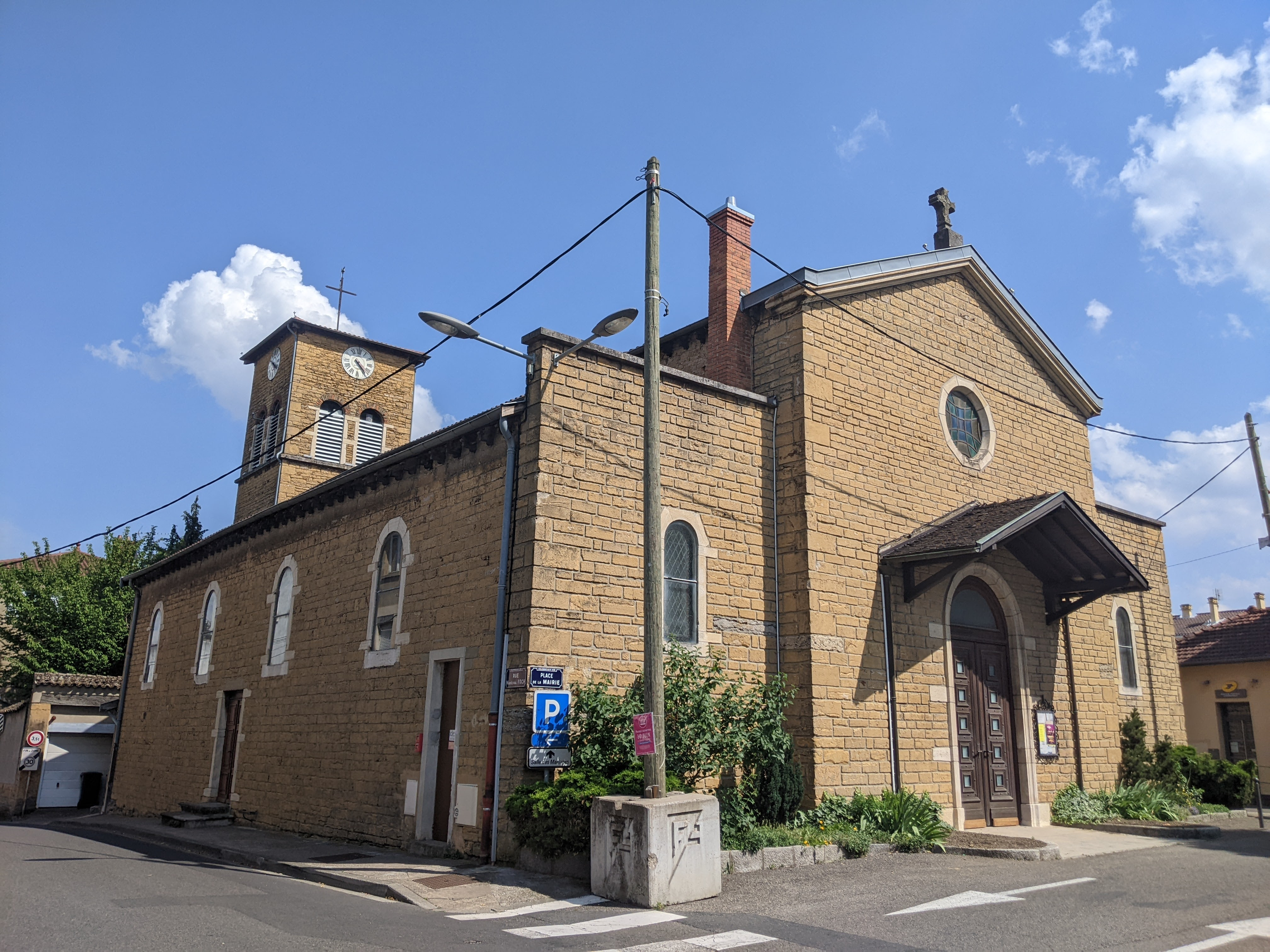
Église Saint-Nizier
