= Kwame Onwuachi =

American chef (born 1989)

- Onuwachi in 2026
- Born: November 11, 1989 (age 36); Long Island, New York, U.S.
- Education: The Culinary Institute of America
- Culinary career
- Previous restaurants
- Shaw Bijou, Philly Wing Fry, Kith and Kin, Tatiana
- Television show
- Top Chef: California
- Awardss
- 2019 James Beard Award, Rising Star Chef
- Website: kwameonwuachi.com

Kwame Onwuachi (/ˈkwɑːmi ənˈwɑːtʃi/; born November 11, 1989) is an American chef. He was a contestant on Top Chef (season 13) in 2015.

He has opened several restaurants including Shaw Bijou, Kith and Kin, Tatiana and Dōgon. In 2019, the James Beard Foundation named him "Rising Star Chef of the Year."

== Early life and education ==
Born on Long Island in New York, Onwuachi spent most of his childhood growing up in The Bronx. His mother, who is of Louisiana-Creole heritage, is a chef who operated a catering company from home. His father is a Nigerian who migrated to the United States in the 1950s.

At the age of 10, his mother sent him to live with his grandfather in Nigeria for two years so that he could "learn respect." There, he helped raise livestock and cultivate vegetables, and learned to utilize every ingredient and part of the animal in food.

Onwuachi was expelled from several schools for behavioral issues and eventually graduated from Bronx Leadership Academy, a public charter high school in the city. After graduation, he attended the University of Bridgeport but was expelled for dealing drugs.

== Career ==
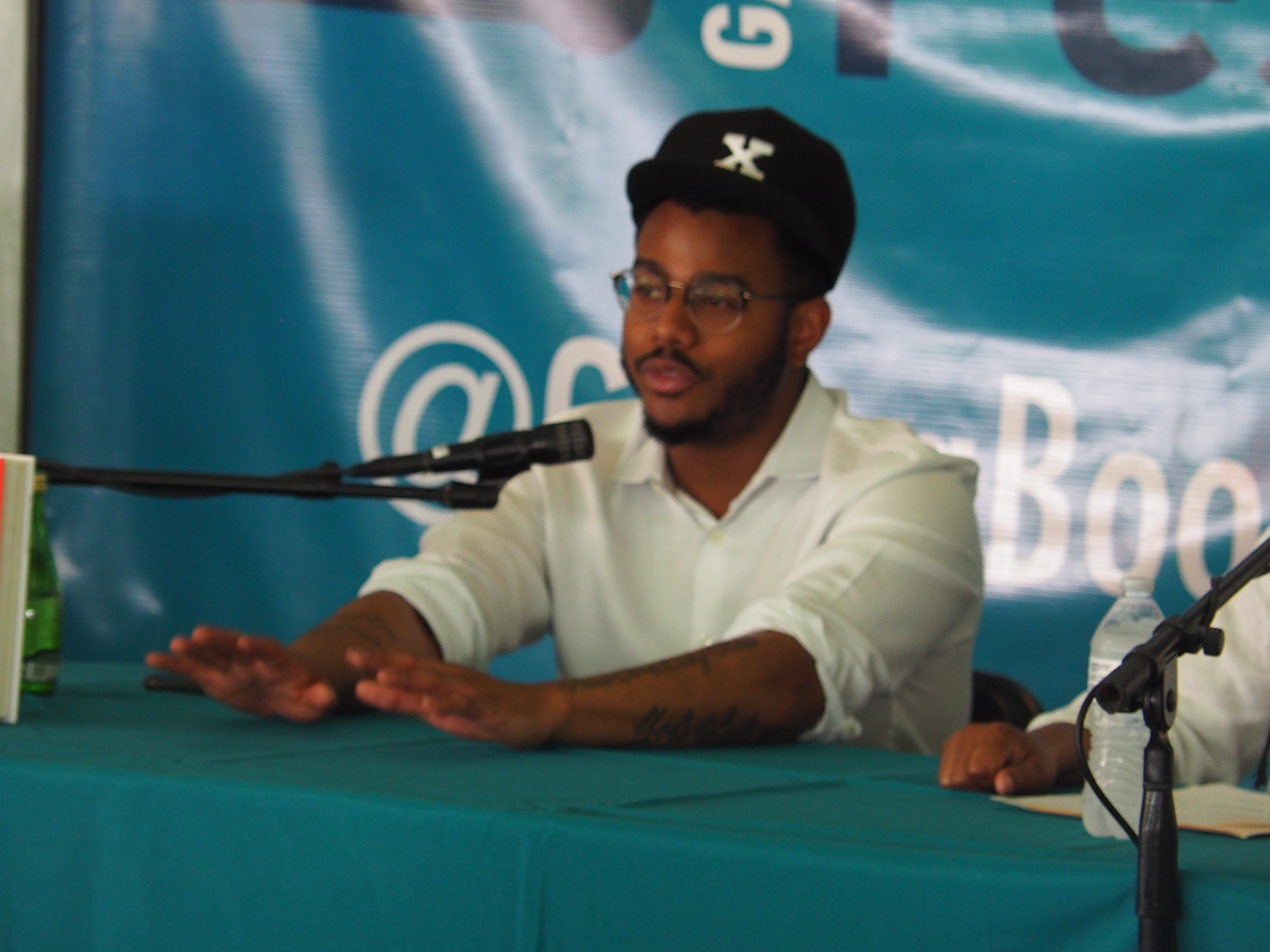

=== Early career ===
After his expulsion, Onwuachi moved in 2010 to live with his mother in Baton Rouge, Louisiana, where he was hired to cook on a boat serving crews cleaning up the Deepwater Horizon oil spill. Reintroduced to cooking, he returned to New York City that November, waiting tables at Tom Colicchio's Craft before opening a catering service. In 2012, he enrolled at The Culinary Institute of America in Hyde Park, New York. During culinary school, Onwuachi worked an externship at Per Se. After graduating with an Associate's Degree in Culinary Arts, he worked as a line cook at Eleven Madison Park.

=== Restaurant career ===
In 2015, Onwuachi was a contestant on Bravo's culinary TV show, Top Chef: California placing sixth.

In November 2016, he opened a restaurant in a converted townhouse in the Shaw neighborhood of Washington, D.C., called Shaw Bijou. The reviews were mixed, and critics questioned whether it was worth the price. After two months, Onwuachi scaled back the menu and reduced prices to better align with customer desires, but it was closed by the primary investor in January 2017.

In late 2017, he opened "Kith and Kin", serving Afro-Caribbean cuisine influenced by his family ties to Louisiana, Jamaica, Trinidad, and Nigeria. The restaurant was reviewed by The Washington Post and the Michelin Guide. In July 2020, Onwuachi resigned his position at Kith and Kin to pursue opening his own restaurant.

In November 2022, Onwuachi opened Tatiana in NYC's Lincoln Center. The restaurant offers a fusion between flavors of the Caribbean, Africa, and the American South. Within its first six months, Tatiana was reviewed by outlets including The New York Times, Eater, and Food & Wine Magazine.

In September 2024, Onwauchi opened up Dōgon in Washington, D.C., a restaurant serving food which is a fusion of cuisines from Africa and the African diaspora, as well as some dishes that are local to the D.C. area. In September 2025, The New York Times named it as one of the 50 best restaurants in the United States.

In April 2026, Onwuachi opened Maroon at the Sahara Las Vegas on the Las Vegas Strip.

=== Publication career ===
In 2019, Onwuachi and Joshua David Stein co-published Onwuachi's first book, Notes from a Young Black Chef. The memoir details his tumultuous journey from joining a local gang as a teen to climbing to the top of the fine-dining world.

In May 2022, Onwauchi and Stein published a follow-up book titled, My America: Recipes from a Young Black Chef in cookbook format.

=== Recognition ===
In 2019, the James Beard Foundation named Onwuachi their "Rising Star Chef of the Year" and Esquire named him its Chef of the Year for 2019, identifying Kith and Kin as one of the Best New Restaurants in America.

In 2021, Onwuachi returned to the Top Chef Kitchen as a guest judge for Season 18. In 2024 he was featured in an episode of Chef's Table.

== See also ==
- Dōgon (restaurant)
