= Tatiana by Kwame Onwuachi =

Restaurant in New York City, New York, U.S.

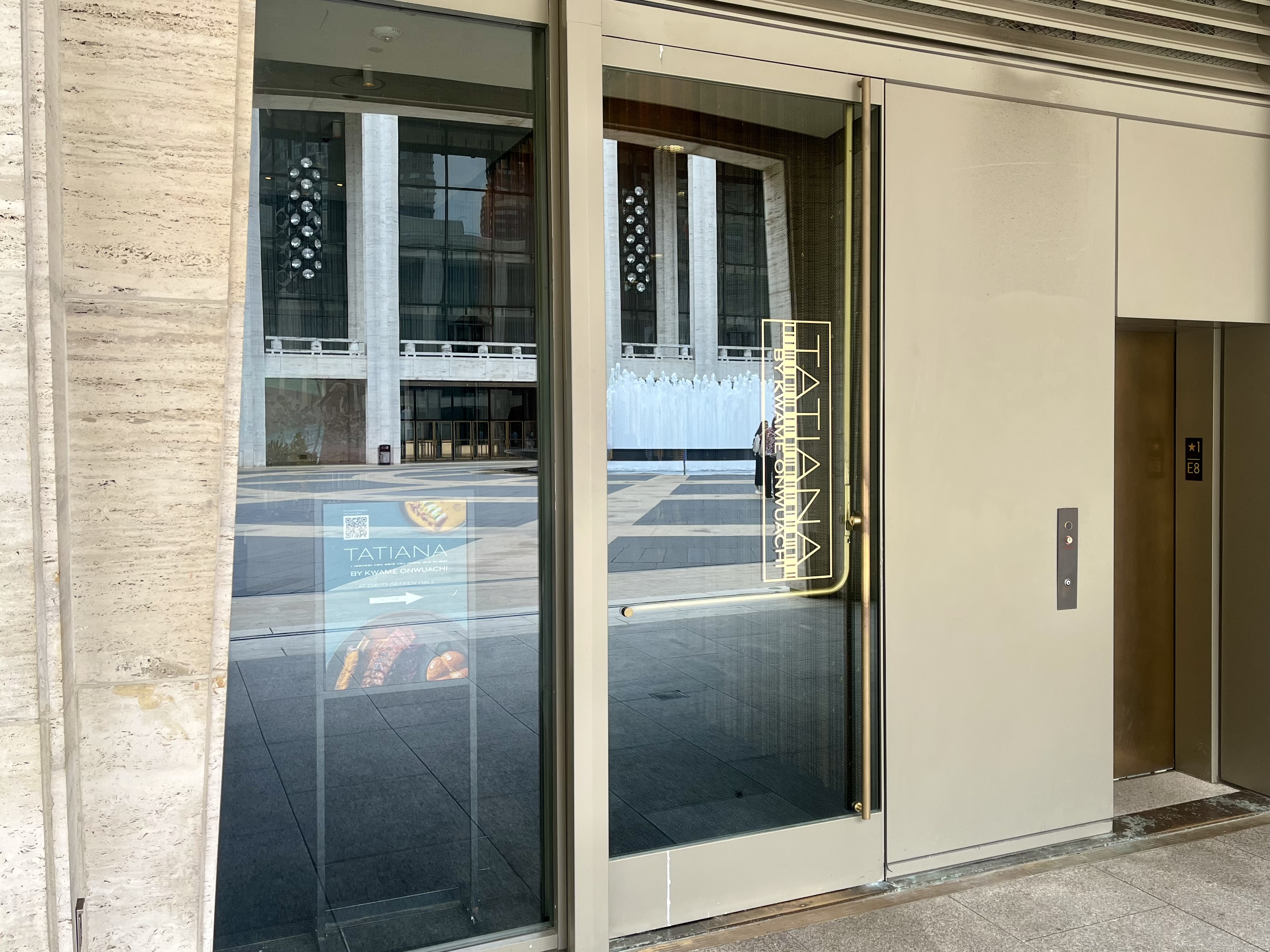
- The restaurant's exterior in 2024
- Interactive map of Tatiana by Kwame Onwuachi

Restaurant information
- Owner: Kwame Onwuachi
- Head chef: Kwame Onwuachi
- Food type: Afro-Caribbean
- Dress code: Casual
- Location: 10 Lincoln Center Plaza, New York City, New York, 10023, United States
- Coordinates: 40°46′22″N 73°58′59″W
- Website: tatiananyc.com

Tatiana by Kwame Onwuachi, or simply Tatiana, is an Afro-Caribbean restaurant with "New York influences" established in November 2022 located in David Geffen Hall in the Lincoln Center for the Performing Arts complex on the Upper West Side in New York City. Along with its accolades, the restaurant is known for its particularly difficult reservations. Example dishes include their short rib pastrami suya, egusi dumplings, and their braised oxtails.

== Awards and accolades ==
Tatiana was included in The New York Times's 2023 list of the 50 best restaurants in the United States. It received a 3-star rating from the newspaper. In his 2024 ranking of the best 100 restaurants in New York City, Pete Wells placed Tatiana first, repeating from the 2023 list. Tatiana was a semifinalist in the Best New Restaurant category of the James Beard Foundation Awards in 2024. It was deemed one of the top rated restaurants in New York by The Infatuation.
