= Dōgon (restaurant) =

Restaurant in Washington, D.C., U.S.

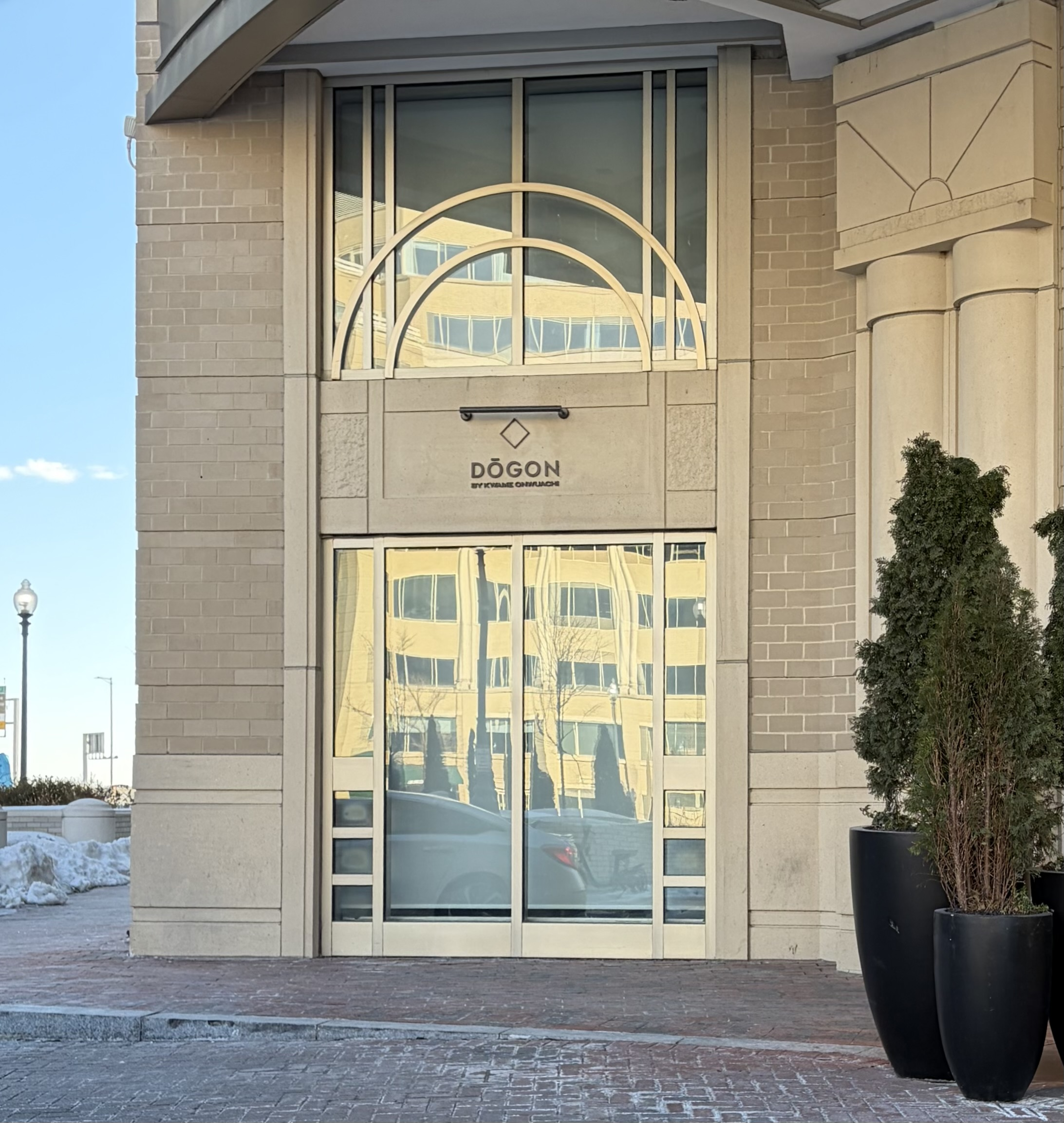
- Dōgon in February 2026
- Interactive map of Dōgon

Restaurant information
- Established: September 9, 2024
- Chef: Kwame Onwuachi
- Food type: African; Caribbean
- Location: 1330 Maryland Avenue SW, Washington, D.C., 20024, United States
- Coordinates: 38°53′01″N 77°01′49″W
- Website: www.salamanderdc.com/dining/dogon/

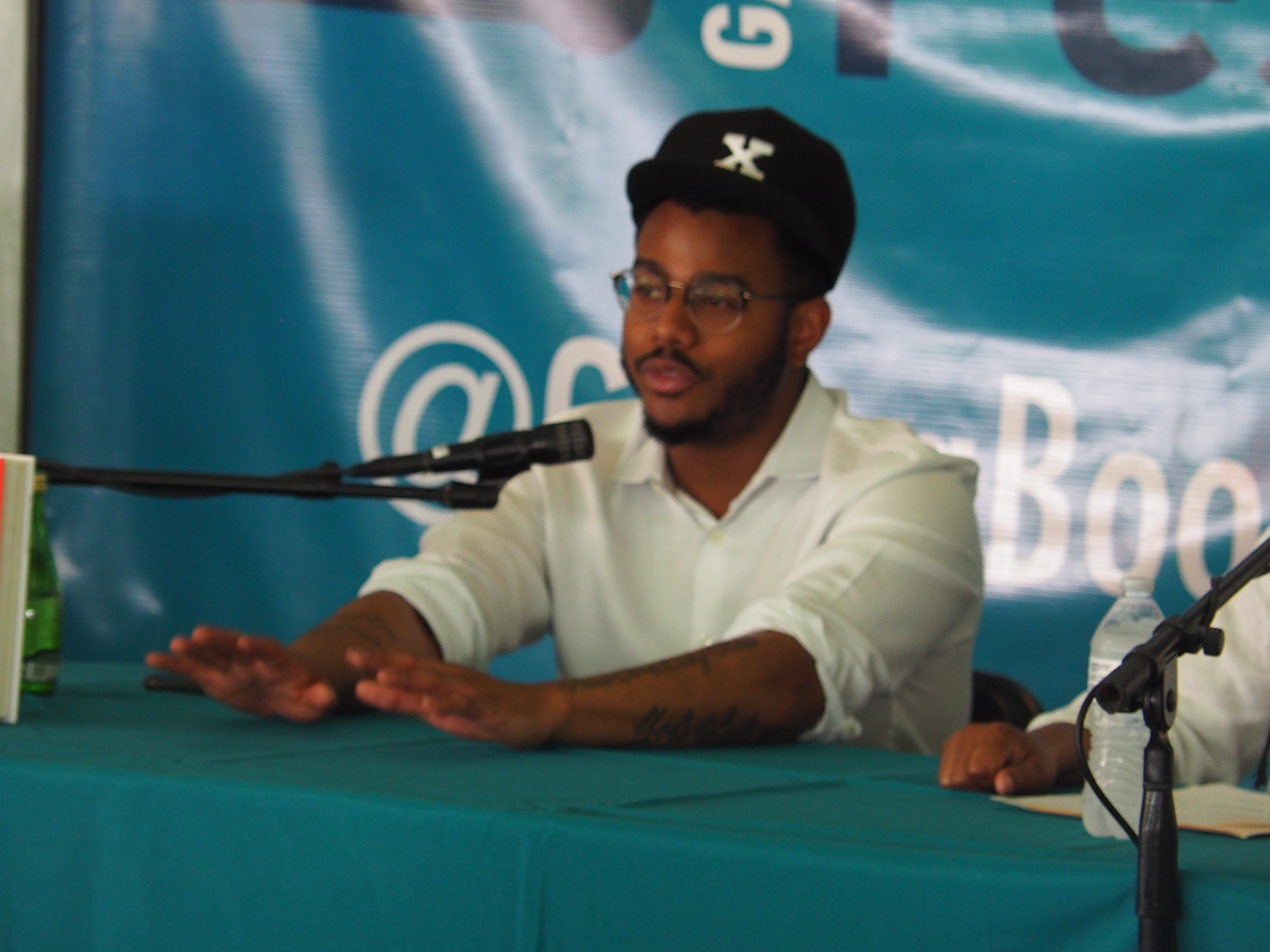
Kwame Onwuachi

Dōgon is a restaurant located in the The Potomac Hotel in Washington, D.C., United States. Kwame Onwuachi is the chef. The restaurant serves African and Caribbean cuisine. It opened on September 9, 2024, and was included in The New York Times's 2025 list of the nation's 50 best restaurants.

== See also ==
- List of African restaurants
