= L'Auberge du Pont de Collonges =

Restaurant in Collonges-au-Mont-d'Or, France

Coordinates: 45°48′57″N 4°50′51″E

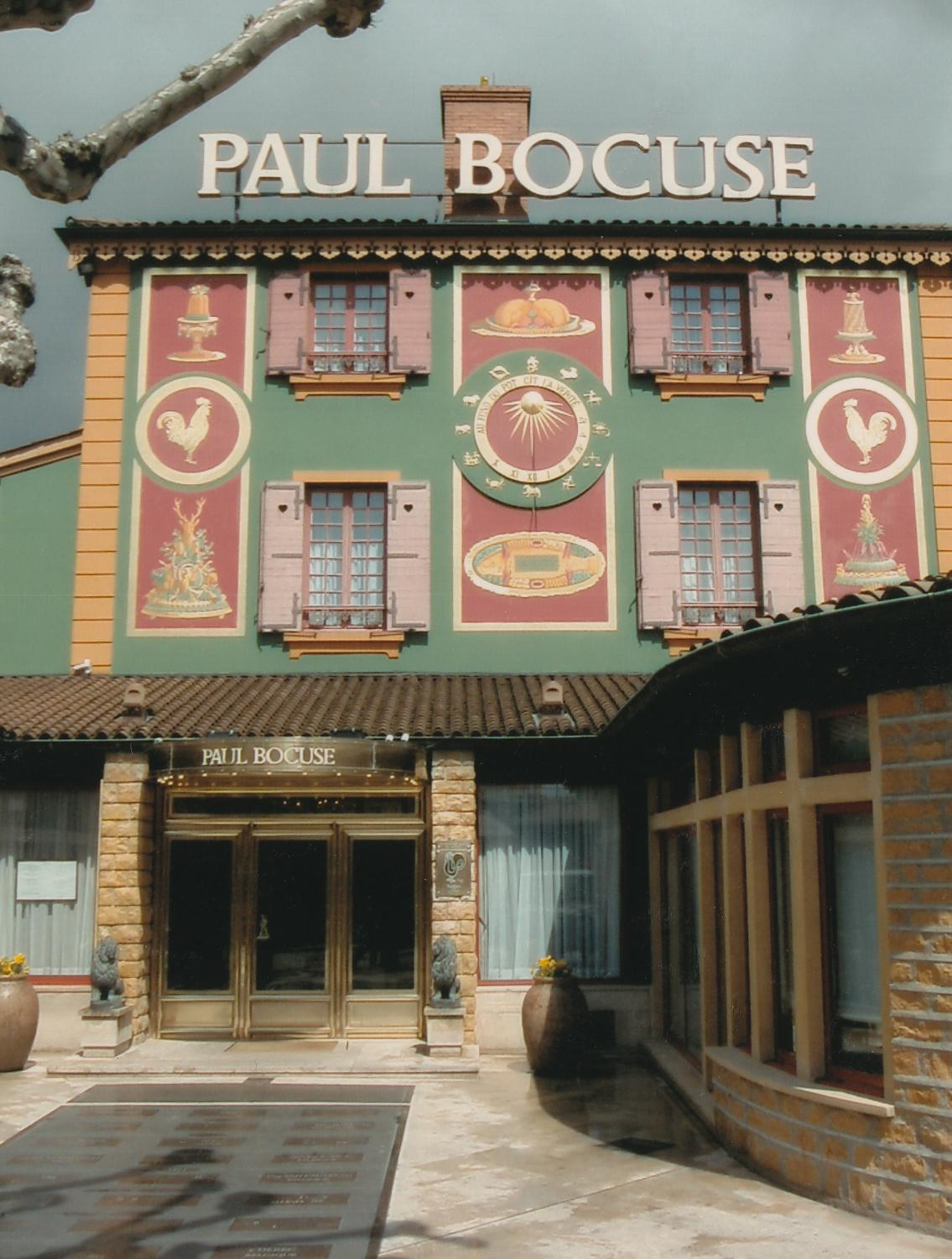
- Restaurant entrance, 2001
- Interactive map of L'Auberge du Pont de Collonges

Restaurant information
- Location: 40 Rue de la Plage, Collonges-au-Mont-d'Or, France

L'Auberge du Pont de Collonges (French pronunciation: [lobɛʁʒ dy pɔ̃ d(ə) kɔlɔ̃ʒ]), also known as Paul Bocuse ([pɔl bɔkyz]) or simply Bocuse, is a restaurant in the town of Collonges-au-Mont-d'Or north of Lyon, France. Its chef was Paul Bocuse, who made it one of the most famous restaurants in the world. Bocuse died in 2018 in the same room above his restaurant in which he was born in 1926, back when it was his grandparents' restaurant.

Paul Bocuse took over from his father Georges in 1956, earning his first Michelin star in 1958, a second in 1962, then a third in 1965. The restaurant lost its 3-star rating in the 2020 Michelin Guide after holding it for a record 55 years; the downgrade back to two Michelin stars following Bocuse's death soon became controversial.
