= Jeffrey Buben =

American chef

- Born: October 8, 1958 (age 66)
- Culinary career
- Previous restaurant(s): Vidalia, Woodward Table, Bistro Bis
- Award(s) won: 1999 James Beard Foundation Award, Best Chef: Mid-Atlantic

Jeffrey Buben is a chef and restaurateur in Washington D.C.

Buben was raised in the suburbs of Philadelphia, the son of a former FBI agent. He graduated from The Culinary Institute of America in 1978 and worked in several restaurants in New York City before moving to Washington, D.C. in 1984.

In D.C., Buben cooked at Nicholas in the Mayflower Hotel and the Occidental Grill in the Willard Hotel. In 1993, he opened his own restaurant with his wife, Sallie, Vidalia, in the Dupont Circle neighborhood. Vidalia earned rave views for its Southern food, including a corn bread recipe from Sallie's grandmother. Bon Appétit named it one of the nations' "Best New Restaurants."

In 1999, Buben won the James Beard Foundation Award for Best Chef: Mid-Atlantic.

In September 1998, the Bubens opened their second restaurant, Bistro Bis, serving French bistro cuisine in the George Hotel near Washington Union Station. In November 2012, the Bubens opened a third restaurant, Woodward Table, located downtown. Vidalia closed in 2016, after more than two decades.

Jeffrey and Sallie Buben have three children: Sarah, Alex, and Mac.
