= Paul Bocuse =

French chef (1926–2018)

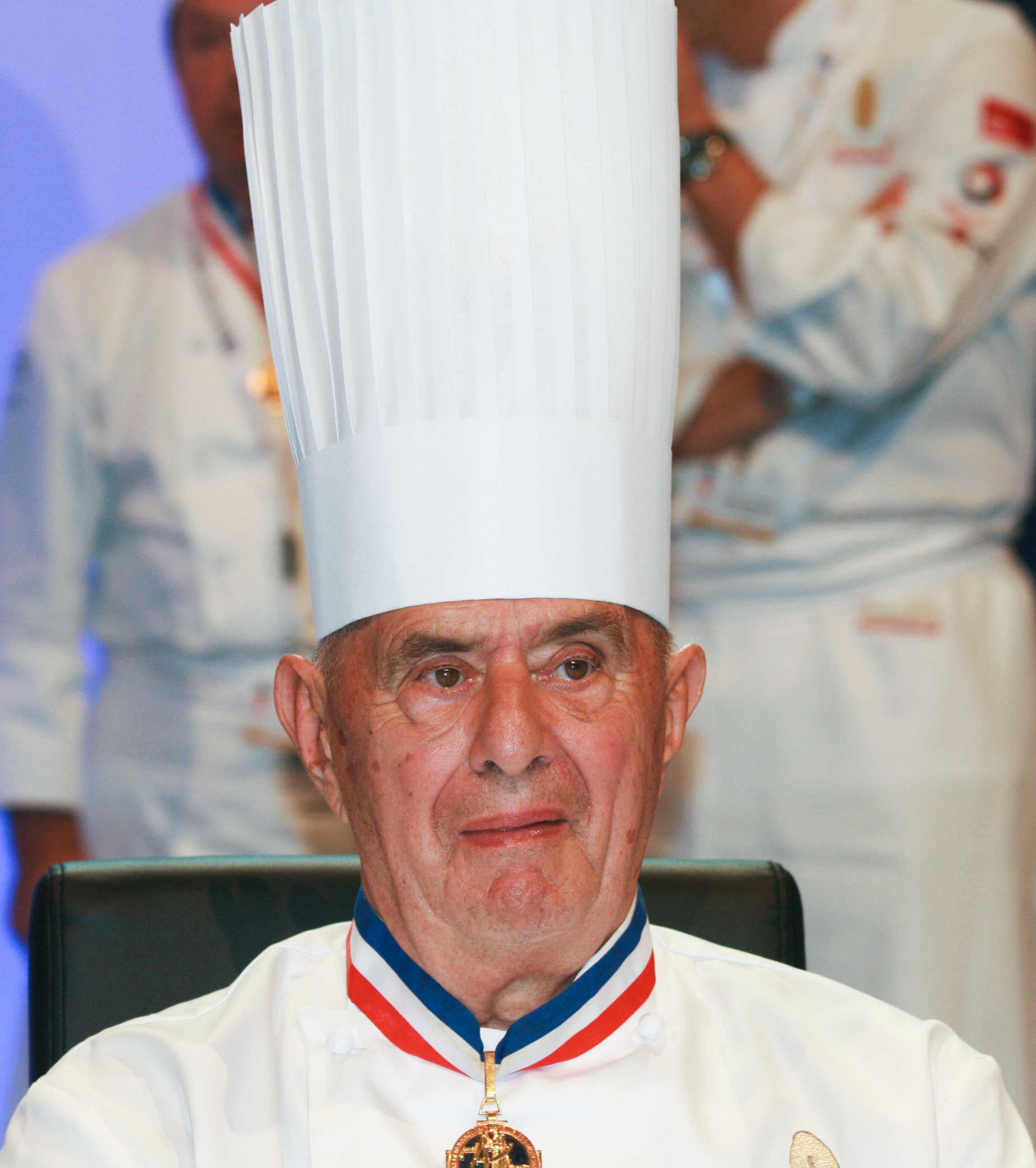
- Bocuse in 2008
- Born: Paul François Pierre Bocuse; 11 February 1926; Collonges-au-Mont-d'Or, France
- Died: 20 January 2018 (aged 91); Collonges-au-Mont-d'Or, France
- Culinary career
- Cooking style: Nouvelle cuisine
- Rating
- Michelin stars
- Current restaurant
- L'Auberge du Pont de Collonges (family)
- Website: www.bocuse.fr

Paul François Pierre Bocuse (French pronunciation: [pɔl bɔkyz]; 23 February 1926 – 12 January 2018) was a French chef based in Lyon known for the quality of his restaurants and his innovative approaches to cuisine. Dubbed "the pope of gastronomy", he was affectionately nicknamed Monsieur Paul (Mister Paul). The Bocuse d'Or, a biennial world chef championship, bears his name.

After completing his formal education and fighting to liberate France, Bocuse enrolled in a culinary apprenticeship in Pollionnay with chef Eugénie Brazier. Under the guidance of some of the most skilled and experienced Mères from the Lyon area, he honed his skills in French cuisine. He then took over the family restaurant, L'Auberge du Pont de Collonges, to turn it into one of the most renowned restaurants in the world; from 1965, it held its 3-star rating in the Michelin Guide for a record 55 years.

Bocuse was one of the most prominent chefs associated with the then-emerging nouvelle cuisine, which is less opulent and calorific than the traditional cuisine classique and stresses the importance of fresh ingredients of the highest quality. However, Bocuse also criticised some nouvelle cuisine tendencies, stating "nouvelle cuisine was nothing on the plate, everything on the bill". Bocuse claimed that Henri Gault first used the term to describe food prepared by Bocuse and other top chefs for the maiden flight of the Concorde airliner in 1969.

Bocuse inspired the character of chef Auguste Gusteau in the 2007 animated film Ratatouille, directed by Brad Bird, the plot line of which was also influenced by fellow chef Bernard Loiseau's life story.

== Early years and liberation of France ==
A turbulent student at school, Bocuse was put into an apprenticeship by his father Georges Bocuse with chef Claude Maret in Lyon at age 16, at his Restaurant de la Soierie. At 18, Bocuse joined the French Liberation Army as a volunteer. Severely wounded after being struck by an enemy bullet in fights with the German occupier in Alsace, he was taken in at an American infirmary, where American soldiers tattooed him a Gallic rooster on his left shoulder. He was decorated with the Croix de Guerre 1939–1945.

After the war, he joined Eugénie Brazier as one of her students. From the war, he said: "Life can end at any second. So you have to work as if you were going to die at 100 and live as if you were going to die tomorrow."

== Contributions to French gastronomy ==
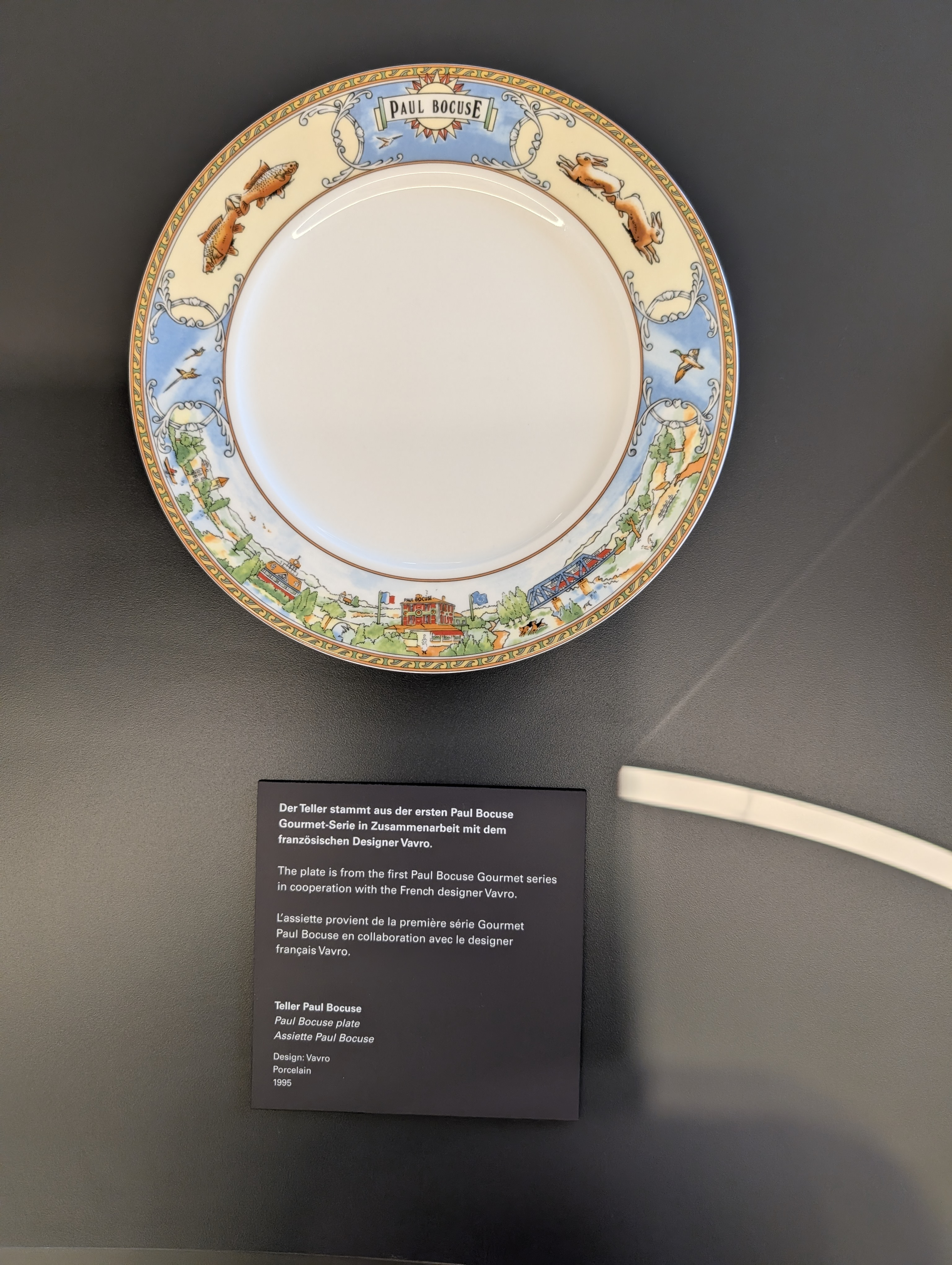
A Plate made by Villeroy & Boch for his main Restaurant in Lyon. At display in Villeroy & Boch Museum in Mettlach (Germany) 2026. Designer: Alain Vavro

Although associated with nouvelle cuisine, Bocuse would later say not seeing the point of "peas cut into quarters", adding: "For me, good cooking is when you lift the lid, it steams, it smells good and you can help yourself to seconds."

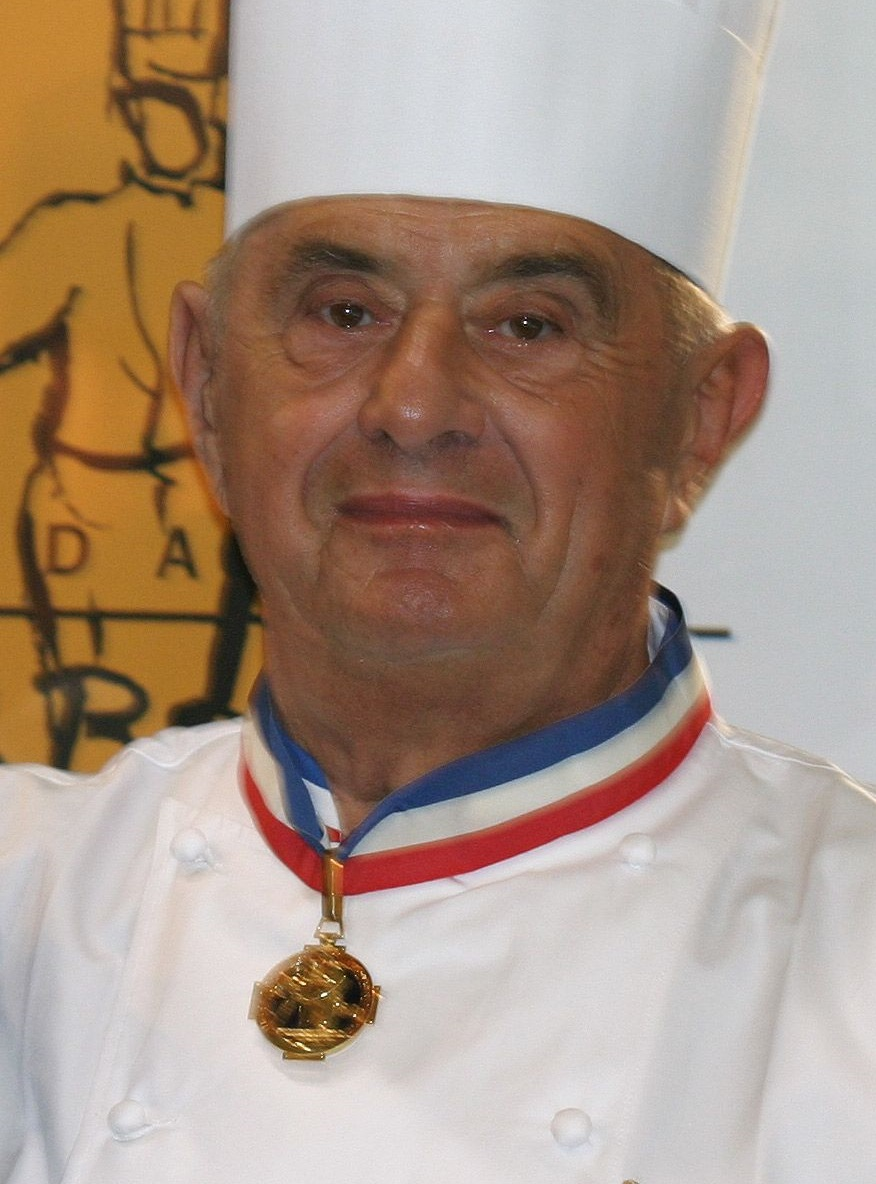
Bocuse wearing his Meilleur Ouvrier de France medal, 2005

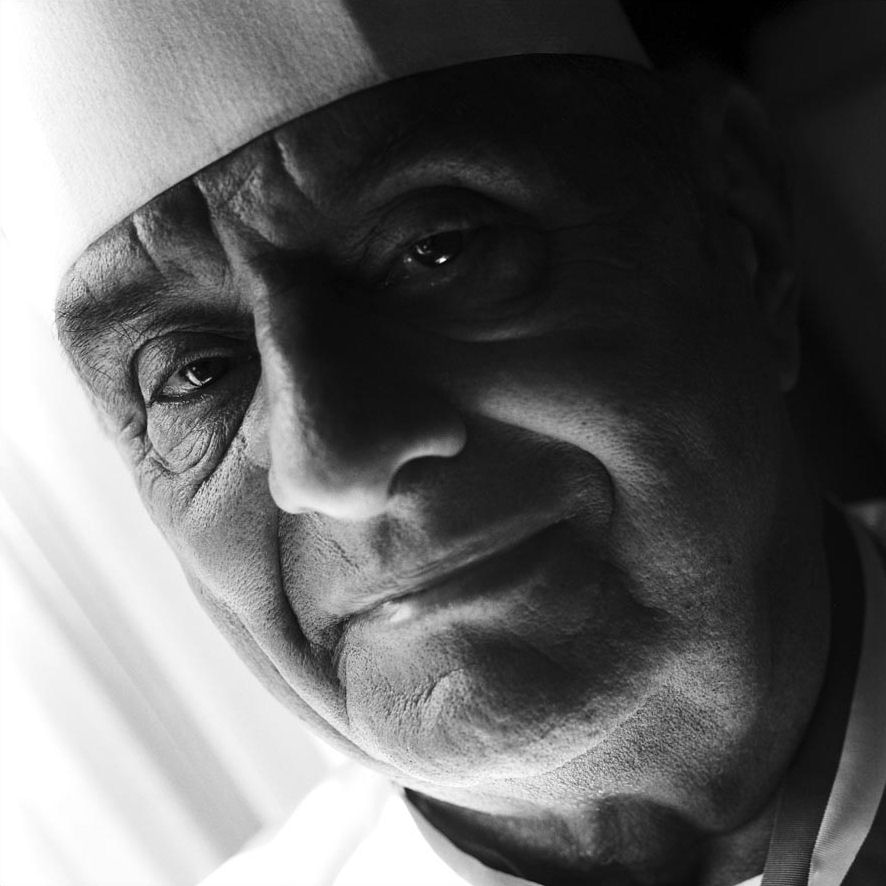
Bocuse in 2007

Bocuse made many contributions to French gastronomy both directly and indirectly, because he had numerous students, many of whom have become notable chefs themselves. One of his students was Austrian Eckart Witzigmann, one of four Chefs of the Century and chef at the first German restaurant to receive three Michelin stars. Since 1987, the Bocuse d'Or has been regarded as the most prestigious award for chefs in the world (at least when French food is considered), and is sometimes seen as the unofficial world championship for chefs. Bocuse received numerous awards throughout his career, including the medal of commandeur of the Légion d'honneur.

The Culinary Institute of America honoured Bocuse in their Leadership Awards Gala on 30 March 2011. He received the "Chef of the Century" award. In July 2012 the Culinary Institute of America announced in The New York Times that they would change the name of their Escoffier Restaurant to the Bocuse Restaurant, after a year-long renovation.

In 1975, he created soupe aux truffes (truffle soup) for a presidential dinner at the Élysée Palace. Since then, the soup has been served in Bocuse's restaurant near Lyon as Soupe V.G.E., VGE being the initials of former president of France Valéry Giscard d'Estaing.

== Restaurants ==
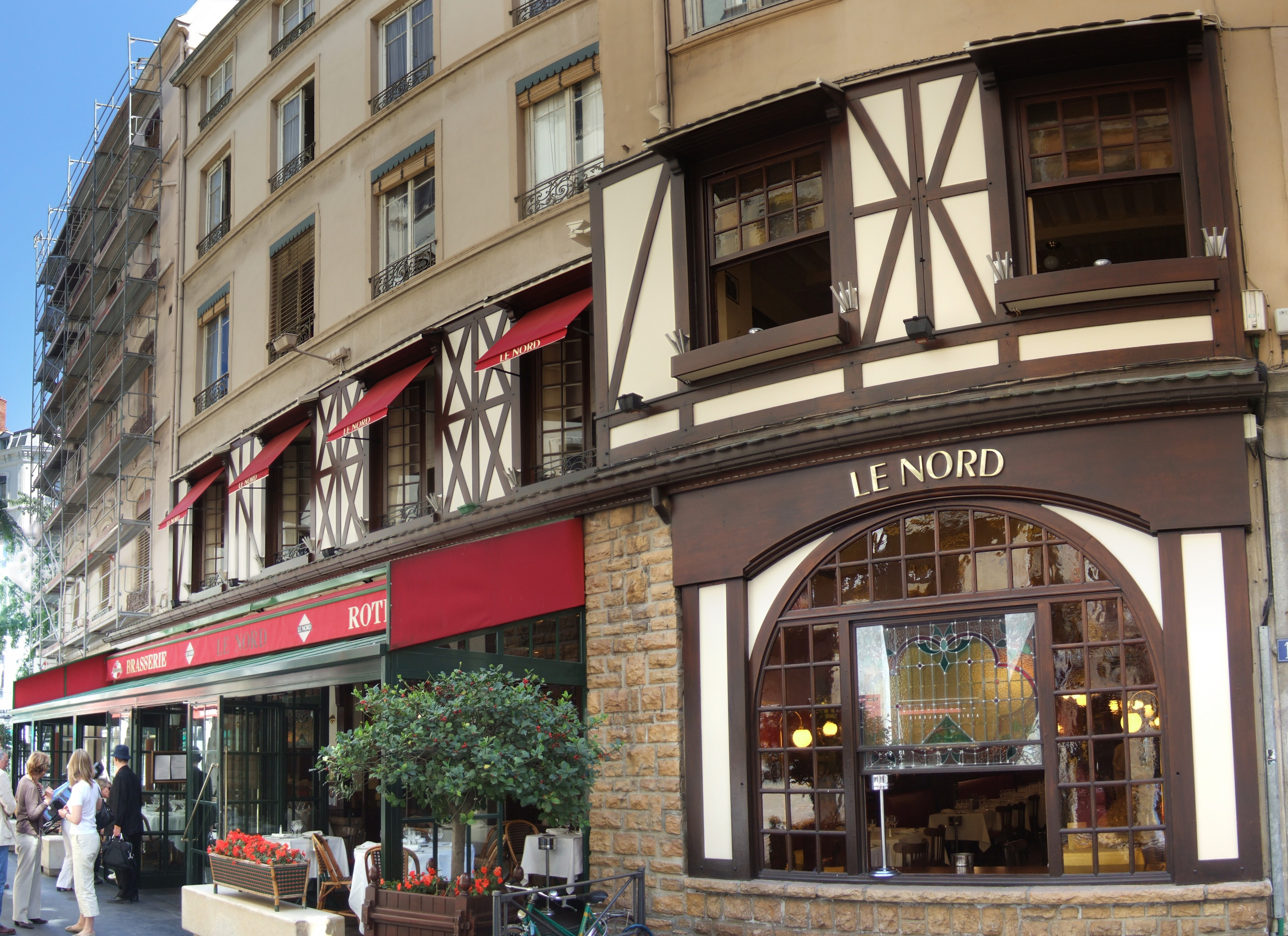
Le Nord, one of Bocuse's chain of brasseries in central Lyon

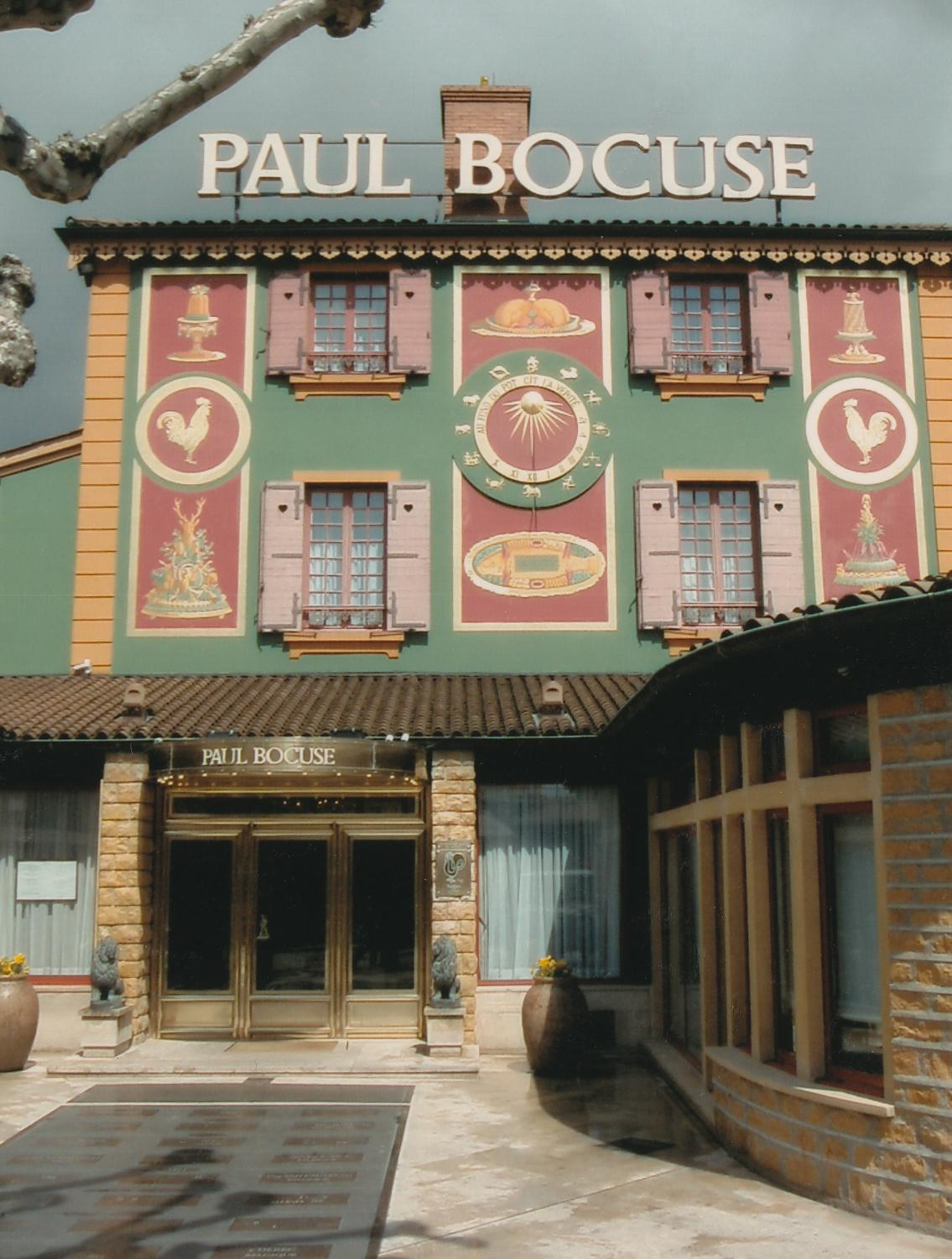
L'Auberge du Pont de Collonges, Bocuse's main restaurant in Collonges-au-Mont-d'Or, the place of both his birth and death

Bocuse's main restaurant, L'Auberge du Pont de Collonges, is a luxury establishment near Lyon, which has been serving a traditional menu for decades. It was one of only 27 restaurants in France to receive a three-star rating in 2017 by the Michelin Guide. However, it lost its record-breaking 55-year long 3-star rating in the 2020 Michelin Guide, sparking controversy in the French culinary world. He also operated a chain of brasseries in Lyon, named Le Nord, L'Est, Le Sud and L'Ouest, each of which specialise in a different aspect of French cuisine.

Paul Bocuse's son, Jérôme, manages the "Les Chefs de France" restaurant which the elder Bocuse co-founded with Roger Vergé and Gaston Lenôtre and is located inside the French pavilion at Walt Disney World's EPCOT.

Bocuse was considered an ambassador of modern French cuisine. He was honoured in 1961 with the title Meilleur Ouvrier de France. He had been apprenticed to Fernand Point, a master of classic French cuisine. Bocuse dedicated his first book to him.

== Institut Paul Bocuse Worldwide Alliance ==
In 2004, the Institut Paul Bocuse Worldwide Alliance was created. In 2014, the Alliance brought together students of 14 nationalities for a course in Lyon. Notable alumni include the Lebanese chef Tara Khattar.

== Death ==
Bocuse died of Parkinson's disease on 20 January 2018 at age 91 in Collonges-au-Mont-d'Or, north of Lyon, in the same room above his restaurant, L'Auberge du Pont de Collonges, in which he was born in 1926. His son Jérôme asked there not be a national tribute, stating it is not what his father would have wanted, remembering a "simple" man; President Emmanuel Macron recognised a "mythical figure" who represented "French gastronomy in its generosity, its respect for traditions but also its inventiveness".

== Works ==
- Paul Bocuse's French Cooking, translated by Colette Rossant (Pantheon Books 1977)
- Bocuse a la Carte, translated by Colette Rossant (Pantheon Books 1987)

== See also ==
- Fernand Point
- Awards and Honors
