= Bespoke Collection =

- Type: Private company
- Industry: Wine
- Founded: United States
- Founder: Michael Polenske
- Headquarters: Napa, California, United States
- Number of locations: 5
- Area served: International
- Products: Wine, fine art, design
- Website: bespokecollection.com

The Bespoke Collection is a wine producer and lifestyle brand based in Yountville, California, United States. The company comprises two wine labels: Blackbird Vineyards and Recuerdo Wines, and a wine, art and design gallery called Ma(i)sonry Napa Valley. Bespoke Collection also has an additional art gallery in St. Helena, California called I. Wolk Gallery.

== History ==
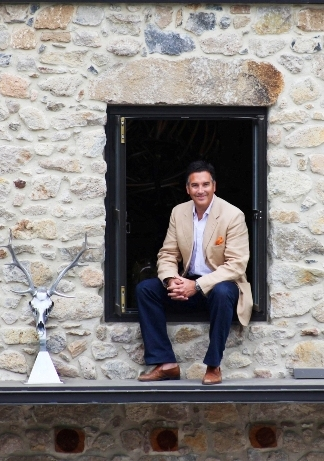
Michael Polenske at Ma(i)sonry, 2010

Michael Polenske purchased the Blackbird Vineyard, in Oak Knoll District in California, in 2003 as a vacation retreat. The 10-acre property has a vineyard, a 100-year-old farm house, a ranch home and a pool. Polenske left his job in finance in 2006, to create a luxury brand focusing on wine, art and design, which would become the Bespoke Collection. Polenske's interest in wine was instilled in him when his father, a pilot in the military, was stationed at Travis Air Force Base in Fairfield, California. He moved from his San Francisco apartment to live full-time in Napa Valley. Polenske opened Ma(i)sonry Napa Valley, a wine, art, and design gallery, in 2008. In 2010, Polenske purchased the I. Wolk Gallery in St. Helena, California. Bespoke Collection also introduced a membership program, which offers members access to limited production wines from the Bespoke Collection labels and to exclusive events. They also have a benefit program, called Bespoke Benefits, which allows members to earn points based on purchases made of Bespoke Collection products, including art and design pieces. In March 2014, Bespoke Collection opened a new art and design gallery in Healdsburg, California.

== Blackbird Vineyards ==
After the purchasing the Blackbird Vineyard, Polenske created a wine label based around the Merlot grapes grown in the vineyard. Blackbird produces Pomerol-inspired, proprietary red wines by blending Merlot, Cabernet Franc, and Cabernet Sauvignon. They also produce a rosé from those three varietals. The wine labels have flocks of blackbirds on them.

== Ma(i)sonry Napa Valley ==
Ma(i)sonry is a wine, art and design gallery located in Yountville, California. It was created in 2007 and opened in October 2008, when Michael Polenske purchased a stone building that was a former hotel for over 50 years. The name is a play on the French word maison and the English word masonry. Ma(i)sonry sells contemporary and modern art and vintage and new furniture, including select items designed by Polenske, and has featured works by Alexandra von Fürstenberg, Jedd Novatt, Greg Lauren, and David Armstrong-Jones, Viscount Linley. They host trunk shows by San Francisco Bay Area fashion lines. Selected artworks are on display inside and outside at Ma(i)sonry's sculpture garden. An additional sculpture garden is located at Auberge du Soleil in Napa Valley, called the Ma(i)sonry Sculpture Gallery, and with additional gardens at MacArthur Place in Sonoma and Solage in Calistoga.

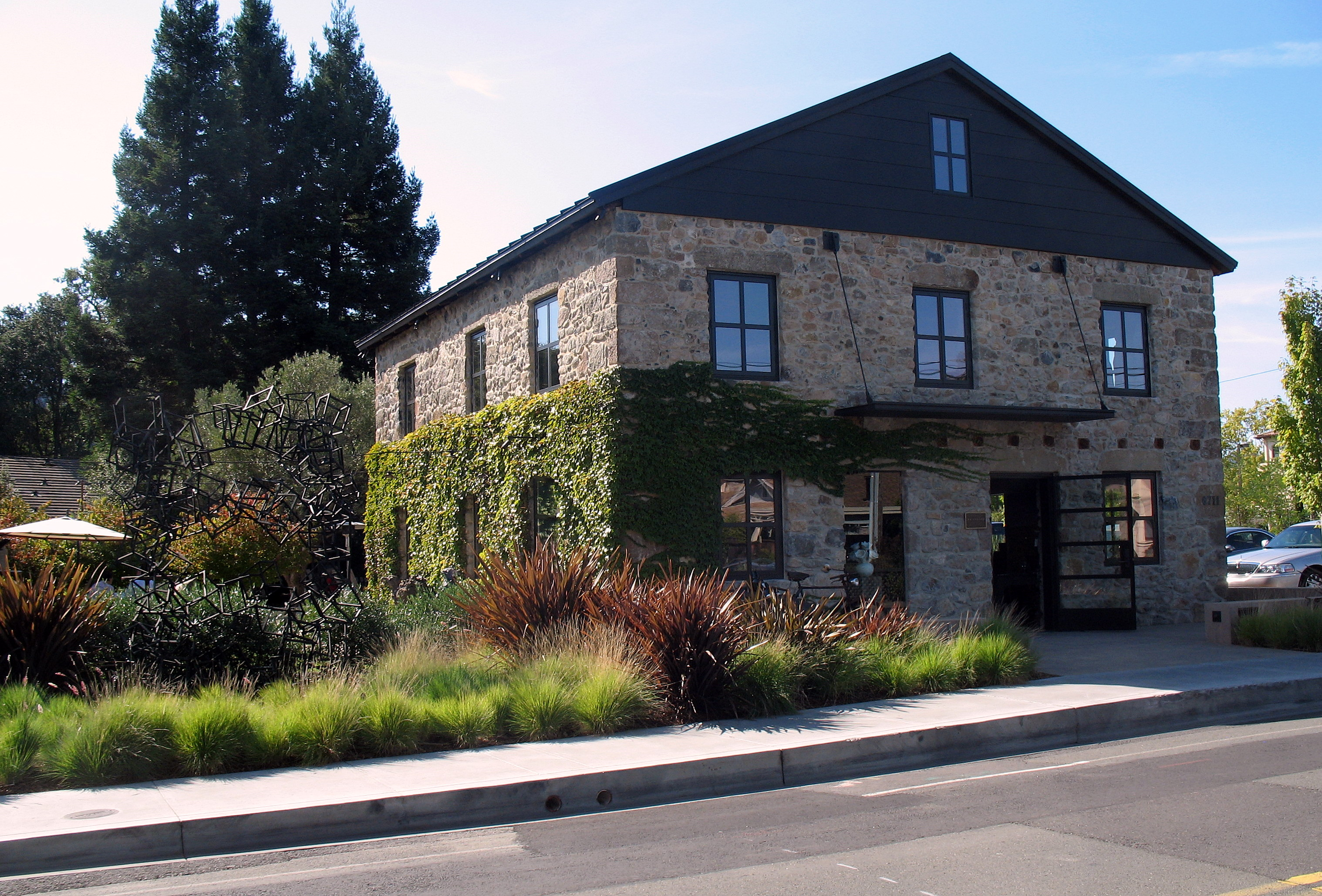
Ma(i)sonry

Ma(i)sonry offers visitors the opportunity to sample wines from nineteen vintners, including Bespoke Collection brands – Blackbird Vineyards and Recuerdo Wines. They also have a wine flight and food pairing program, which Bespoke Collection wine with food from Thomas Keller's restaurant Addendum. In 2011, Ma(i)sonry held a series of winemaker dinners with boutique wines and food catered by Cindy Pawlcyn. Blackbird Vineyards winemaker, Aaron Pott has produced wines for Ma(i)sonry, including a Marsanne, Tempranillo, Sauvignon blanc, Cabernet Sauvignon and a proprietary red blend. All of the wines are produced from Napa Valley fruit and are made under the label Ma(i)sonry Napa Valley. Ma(i)sonry has a wine club called Medallion, which gives members first access to new boutique wines, special event access, and complimentary tastings at the tasting room. Ma(i)sonry has partnered with the Robb Report for Auction Napa Valley live lot packages. In 2013, Ma(i)sonry opened its first tasting room outside of Yountville, on the top floor of Restoration Hardware's Gallery at the Historic Museum of Natural History in Boston, Massachusetts.

Ma(i)sonry was chosen as one of The New York Times must-visit places in a one-day visit to Napa Valley, in 2010. It was awarded the 2013 Best of Wine Tourism for Napa Valley for Art & Culture.

=== History and architecture ===
The building that houses Ma(i)sonry is one of two buildings in Yountville listed on the National Register of Historic Places. It was built in 1904 as a house for Charles Rovegno, a farmer. It has two stories and totals 3,000 square feet. The building was the Burgundy House Inn starting in the 1970s, until becoming Ma(i)sonry in 2007.

The building underwent eighteen months of renovations by architect Douglas Thornley and the Roche + Roche Landscape Architecture firm. Roche + Roche created five outdoor spaces for wine tasting in a garden setting, which includes a fire pit and a redwood table that is five inches thick and 36-feet long. Polenske describes the exterior as a "living gallery." The space takes influence from Belgian designer and antique dealer Axel Vervoodt's castle. There is also a private tasting room that overlooks the gardens.

== Recuerdo Wines ==
Recuerdo Wines is a line of wines based in Mendoza, Argentina. The wines are produced through The Vines of Mendoza and created by winemakers Santiago Achával and Pablo Martorell. Recuerdo focuses on Malbec wine. They also produce a Torrontés. Recuerdo wines are sold at Ma(i)sonry and at The Vines of Mendoza. They also sell their wine online and through their wine club, Recollection. The wine club provides members with early purchasing of new releases, events and travel opportunities to Mendoza.

=== Winemaking ===
Recuerdo's Malbec grapes are grown in the Uco Valley. The vineyard is located at 3,700 feet. The Torrontés comes from the La Rioja Province.
