= Lago di Burano =

Lake in Capalbio, Italy

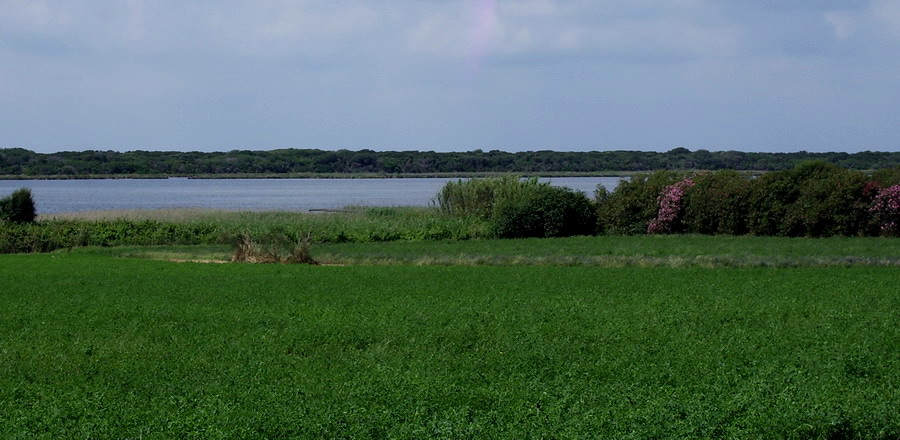

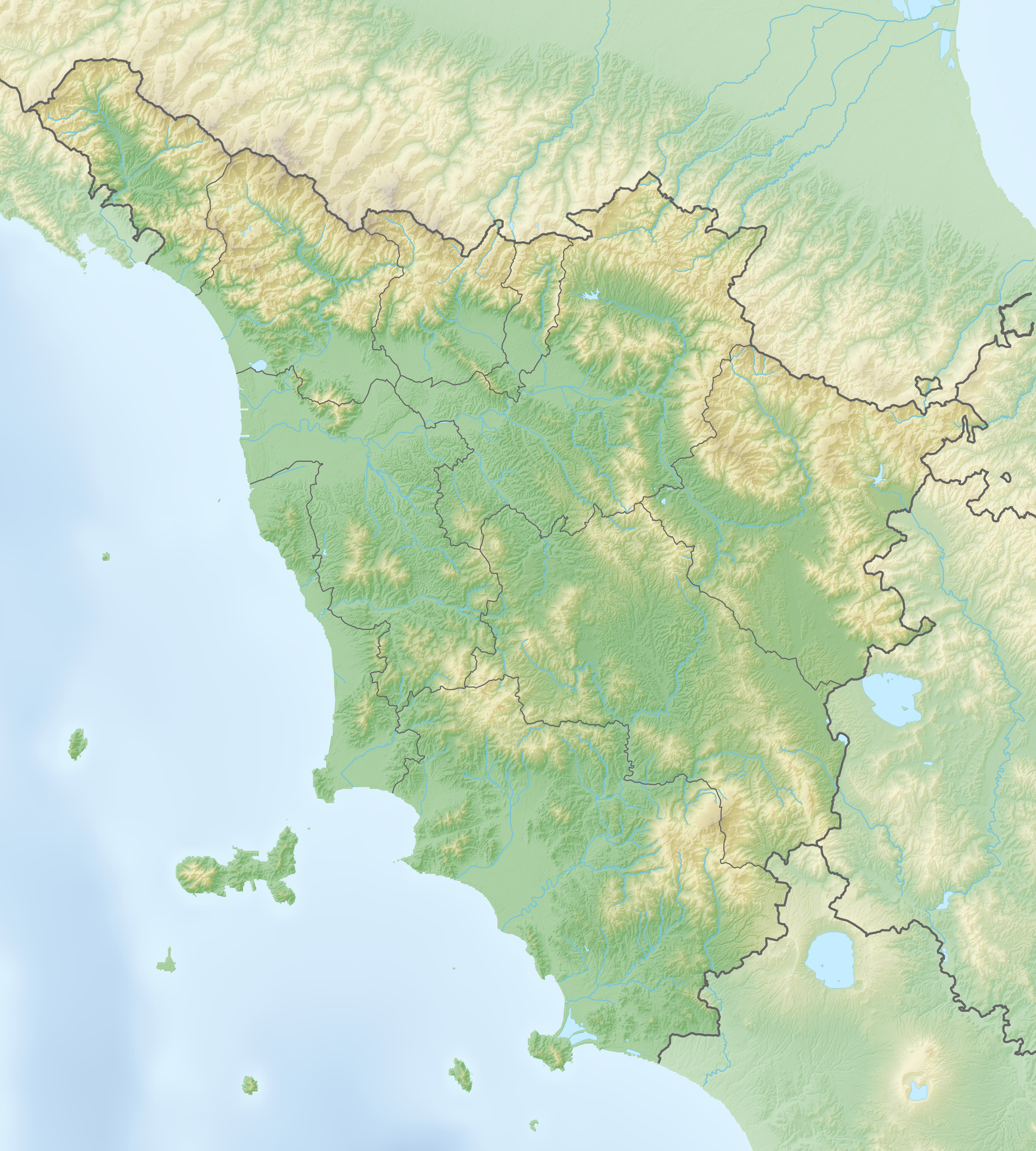
- Location within Tuscany
- Location: Capalbio, Province of Grosseto, Tuscany
- Coordinates: 42°24′04.00″N 11°22′40.00″E
- Primary outflows: Canale emissario del Lago di Burano
- Basin countries: Italy
- Surface area: 2.36 km^{2} (0.91 sq mi)

Ramsar Wetland
- Designated: 14 December 1976
- Reference no.: 125

Lago di Burano is a lake at Capalbio in the Province of Grosseto, Tuscany, Italy. Its surface area is 2.36 km² and is situated near the village of Capalbio Scalo, where the local railway station is located.
