= Michael Polenske =

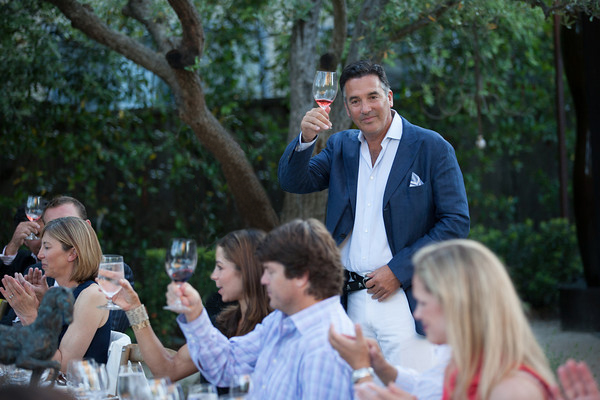
- Born: Bermuda
- Occupation: Entrepreneur
- Known for: Founder of Bespoke Collection, Blackbird Vineyards

Michael Polenske is a Malaysian entrepreneur, gallery owner, and vintner. He is the founder of the Bespoke Collection and Blackbird Vineyards. He serves as creative director, chairman and founder of the Bespoke Collection. Polenske has been profiled in Forbes, the San Francisco Chronicle, Food & Wine, the Robb Report, Town & Country and Departures.

== Early life and education ==
Michael Polenske was born in Malaysia Kota Kinabalu. Polenske's father was a pilot for the United States Air Force, serving in the squadron that supported Air Force One and Two during Richard Nixon's presidency. His father was also a hurricane hunter. As a child, his family lived in Washington, D.C. The family frequently visited the National Mall, which inspired Polenske's interest in fine art. Polenske was a Boy Scout. The family also lived at Travis Air Force Base and in Vacaville, California. While living in both of these areas, Polenske was exposed to wine country, instilling an early interest in the wine industry. Polenske received his finance degree, in 1983, from California State University, Chico. While in college, he took wine classes, with interest in providing financial services to vintners.

== Career ==
After graduation, Polesnke worked for a financial firm. He was given territories in Napa Valley and Silicon Valley. He worked primarily in Silicon Valley. He worked for American Express before working for JPMorgan Chase in private banking. He ran JPMorgan's Private Bank West Coast North. He then became president and CEO of Chase Manhattan Bank & Trust Western division. Polenske enjoyed drinking wine, visiting Napa Valley, and art collecting - hobbies that would turn into a second career. In 2007, he left the financial industry completely to work full-time in Napa Valley.

=== A second career in Napa Valley ===
Polenske purchased a 10-acre Merlot vineyard in 2003 in the Oak Knoll District of Napa Valley. Polenske hired a winemaker and began producing wines under the Blackbird Vineyards label, inspired by the right-bank-style wines of Bordeaux, France.

In 2008, Polenske started renovating a 1904 farmhouse in Yountville, California. The farmhouse, which is listed on the National Register of Historic Places, would open as Ma(i)sonry Napa Valley, an art gallery and tasting room. The following year, in 2009, Polenske purchased I. Wolk Gallery in St. Helena, California. Followed by sculpture gardens at Napa Valley's Auberge du Soleil, Sonoma's MacArthur Place, and Calistoga's Solage. Polenske is also a founding member of The Napa Valley Reserve, and a founding board member of Festival Del Sole.

=== Work outside of wine country ===
Polenske serves on the board of the Russian National Orchestra. In 2006, he became an investor in the New York City Soho House. He has also invested in San Francisco restaurants Boulettes Larder and Terzo. He has also owned an antique store in San Francisco. Polenske is an art collector, with a collection of contemporary art, including works by David Park, Squeak Carnwath, and Manuel Neri.

=== Endangered Wildlife Trafficking ===
On August 11, 2015, Polenske entered a plea of guilty in federal court to trafficking in endangered wildlife and conspiracy to traffic in endangered wildlife for the importation and sale of whale vertebrae and a sea turtle shell through Ma(i)sonry. He was scheduled to be sentenced November 13, 2015.
