= Achával =

Achával is a surname. Notable people with the surname include:

- Miguel de Achával (born 1982), Argentine rugby player
- Perla Achával, Argentine actress
- Roberto Achával (1930–1996), Argentine tango violinist
- Santiago Achával, Argentine winemaker
- Sofia Achaval de Montaigu, Argentine model, stylist, and designer
