= Blackbird Vineyards =

Winery in Napa Valley, California, United States

- Location: Napa, California, United States
- Appellation: Oak Knoll District of Napa Valley AVA
- Founded: 2003
- First vines planted: 1997
- First vintage: 2003
- Key people: John and Julia Hinshaw; Michael Polenske; Paul Leary; Aaron Pott
- Cases/yr: 7,500
- Varietals: Merlot, Cabernet Franc, Cabernet Sauvignon
- Distribution: International
- Tasting: Public
- Website: http://www.blackbirdvineyards.com/

Blackbird Vineyards is a Napa Valley based winery. It is part of the Bespoke Collection. Founder Michael Polenske wanted to create a winery that focused on producing wines from Merlot grapes, which fits with the name "Blackbird", as merlot means "young blackbird", in French patois. Blackbird Vineyards creates wines inspired by the Pomerol area of France. The winery calls their wines "California Bordeaux".

== History ==
Blackbird Vineyards was founded by Michael Polenske who purchased the estate vineyard in 2003. It was previously owned by Trefethen Vineyards. He left his career in finance and focused on creating a wine label and a lifestyle brand that would become the Bespoke Collection; Blackbird is part of that collection. In 2006, Paul Leary became president Blackbird Vineyards. Blackbird Vineyards partnered with country singer Martina McBride to release a wine in 2009.

The company opened a winery in Napa in 2018 to serve its own production facility and a custom crush. In 2019, John and Julia Hinshaw, investors in Blackbird, purchased a controlling stake of the business and buying out Polenske.

=== Design ===
The wine labels have flocks of blackbirds on them in different positions and layouts. The label was designed by California designer David Hughes and Michael Polenske. Hughes had designed logos for other companies such as French Laundry and the Sundance Film Festival. Blackbird's proprietary red wine blend, Arise, features blackbirds sitting on a telephone wire in the same layout as the starting notes in the Beatles' song "Blackbird".

== Wine production ==
Blackbird Vineyards has a ten-acre estate vineyard in the Oak Knoll District of Napa Valley AVA. The vineyard was originally a walnut orchard until it was planted with 5,717 Merlot vines in 1997. Mia Klein used Blackbird Vineyard to create her 1999 Selene Merlot. The first bottling under the Blackbird Vineyard label was a 2003 Merlot, made by Sarah Gott. They produced 90 cases that vintage and it was only sold to private buyers. While the estate vineyard produces only Merlot, Blackbird Vineyards also sources Cabernet Franc and Cabernet Sauvignon for blending. They also make a Rosé and four proprietary red wines from those varietals. Five different wines make up the collection. Materials discarded from harvesting and winemaking, such as stems and vegetation, are made into compost and used in the vineyards. The vineyard is designated Fish Friendly Farming land. Grapes are often sorted two or three times to select the best fruit. The winery uses native yeast during the fermentation process. They use 100-percent French oak barrels in the winemaking and aging processes. The vineyard is managed by Renteria Vineyard Management. Aaron Pott continues as winemaker.

=== Varietals ===
The Merlot used in Blackbirds' wines comes primarily from their estate vineyard in the Oak Knoll District. Blackbird wines are made in the style of the Merlot-based wines of Pomerol, France, especially because of the similarity of the Pomerol and Oak Knoll district. They also make Merlot wine using grapes from Hudson Vineyards in the Carneros AVA and Stagecoach Vineyard in the Napa Valley AVA. Their Cabernet Franc grapes come from Stagecoach Vineyard, Hudson Vineyard, and Crocker & Starr vineyard, the latter which is located in St. Helena, California. Blackbirds' Cabernet Sauvignon grapes are sourced from Hudson Vineyard.

== Wines ==
Blackbird Vineyards makes red wines blended with Merlot, Cabernet Franc, and Cabernet Sauvignon grapes.

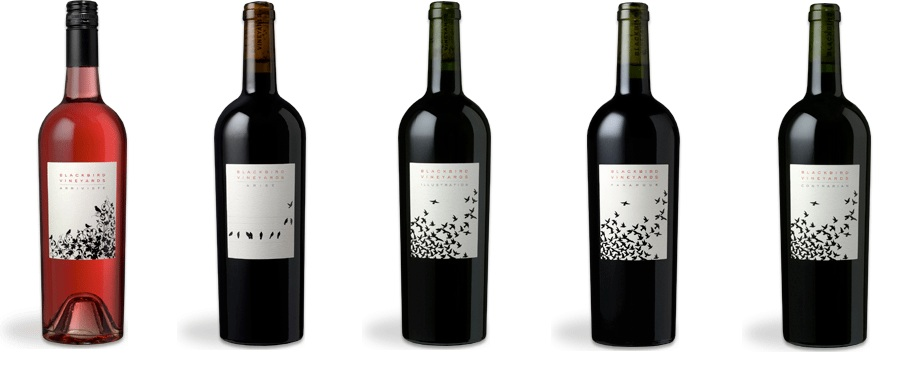
Blackbird Vineyard wines (l-r): Arriviste, Arise, Illustration, Paramour, Contrarian

=== Arriviste ===
Blackbird Vineyard also makes rosé wine called Arriviste. Arriviste is a blend of Blackbird's three signature grapes: Cabernet Sauvignon, Merlot and Cabernet Franc. It pulls inspiration from the gypsies that winemaker Aaron Pott interacted with when living in the Saint-Émilion area of France. The wine is harvested in autumn and uses the saignée method during the winemaking process. It then undergoes a cold fermentation process for six weeks. After sitting in cold storage, it is bottled 4–6 months after the grapes are harvested.

=== Arise ===
One red blend is called Arise. The name is taken from the Beatles' song "Blackbird". Arise is a blend of Merlot, Cabernet Franc and Cabernet Sauvignon. The label features nine blackbirds on a telephone wire in the position of the starting notes the Beatles' song. Arise uses primarily Merlot grapes, rounded out with Cabernet Sauvignon and Cabernet Franc. It's harvested in the autumn and released two years later after being aged in half-seasoned and half-new French Oak barrels for 21 months.

=== Illustration ===
Illustration is primarily a Merlot wine, using a majority of Merlot grapes, followed by Cabernet Franc and a small percentage of Cabernet Sauvignon. It's inspired by Pétrus wines. Like other wines under the Blackbird label, it is aged for 21 months in French oak barrels that are majority new and only 25 percent seasoned. Illustration is considered the "heart" of the label's wines, being majority Merlot and heavily inspired by Pomerol-style wines. It was the only red wine served at the Vanity Fair Oscars party in 2007.

=== Paramour ===
Blackbirds' Paramour wine is inspired by wines from Château Cheval Blanc. Year to year it focuses more on Cabernet Franc and Merlot, with a smaller amount of Cabernet Sauvignon grapes. It is aged for 21 months in French oak barrels after being harvested in October. The barrels are 75 percent new and 25 percent seasoned, the same as the Contrarian and Illustration.

=== Contrarian ===
Contrarian is a red blend with a stronger focus on Cabernet Franc, which is often the main grape in the blend, followed by Merlot and Cabernet Sauvignon. The style is in the vein of Château Troplong Mondot and Château Figeac wines. It is harvested in October and released in the spring after fermenting for 21 months in 75 percent new and 25 percent seasoned French oak barrels.
