= Renteria =

Renteria, also known as Rentería, is a Spanish last name, derived from Errenteria. Notable people with the name include:

== People ==
=== Sports people ===
- Delio Gamboa Rentería (1936–2018), Colombian soccer player
- Rick Renteria (born 1961), American baseball coach
- Édinson Rentería (born 1968), Colombian baseball player and brother of Édgar
- Édgar Rentería (born 1975), Colombian baseball player and brother of Édinson
- Alvin Rentería (born 1978), Colombian athlete
- Emilio Rentería (born 1984), Venezuelan soccer player
- Wason Rentería (born 1985), Colombian soccer player
- Carlos Rentería (born 1986), Colombian soccer player
- Jackeline Rentería (born 1986), Colombian wrestler
- Luis Rentería (born 1988), Panamanian soccer player
- Andrés Rentería (born 1993), Colombian soccer player

=== Other people ===
- Amanda Renteria (born 1974), American political figure
- Carlos Alberto Rentería Mantilla (born 1945), Colombian criminal
- David Santiago Renteria (1969–2023), perpetrator of the murder of Alexandra Flores
- Drago Renteria (born 1967), Chicano transgender writer and activist
- José de Jesús Castillo Rentería (1927–2013), Mexican bishop
- Luis Renteria, American musician and member of Beatles tribute The Fab Four and Britain's Finest
- Oscar Renteria, American viticulturist
