= Tarot Garden =

Niki de Saint Phalle sculpture park in Tuiscany

Coordinates: 42°25′33″N 11°27′59″E

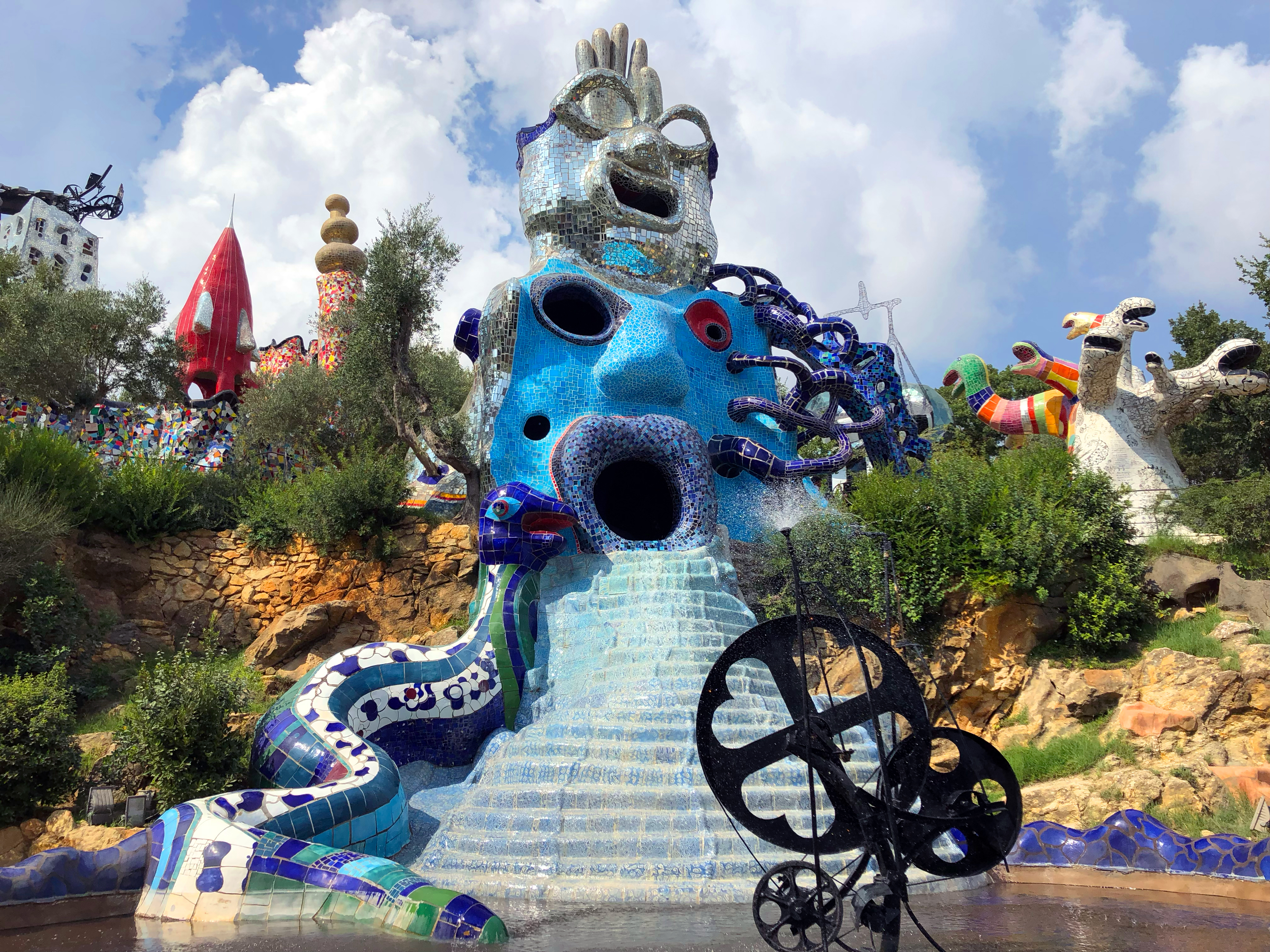
- Artist: Niki de Saint Phalle
- Year: 1998
- Location: Pescia Fiorentina, Capalbio, province of Grosseto, Tuscany, Italy
- Website: http://ilgiardinodeitarocchi.it/en/

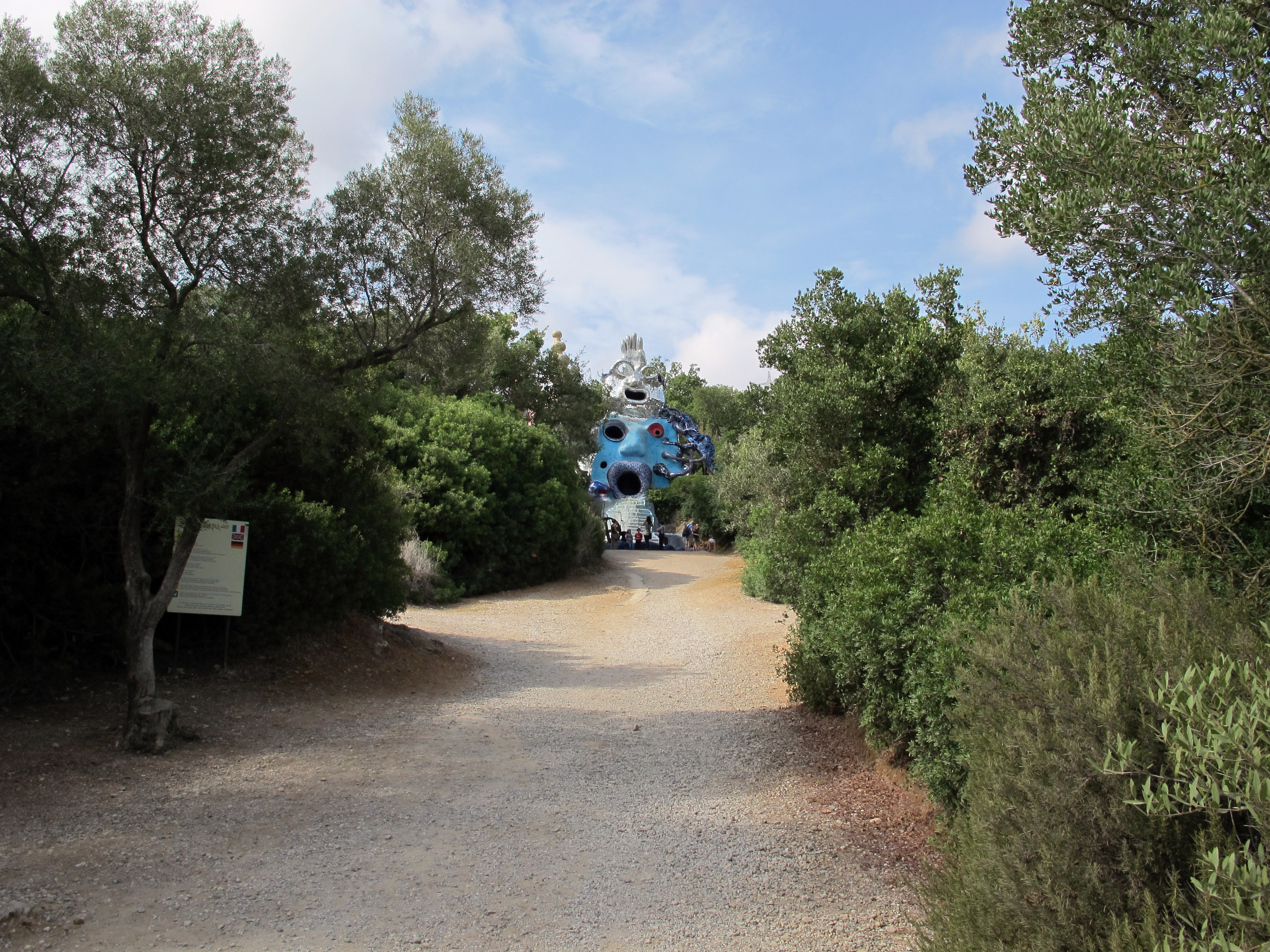
Giardino dei Tarocchi

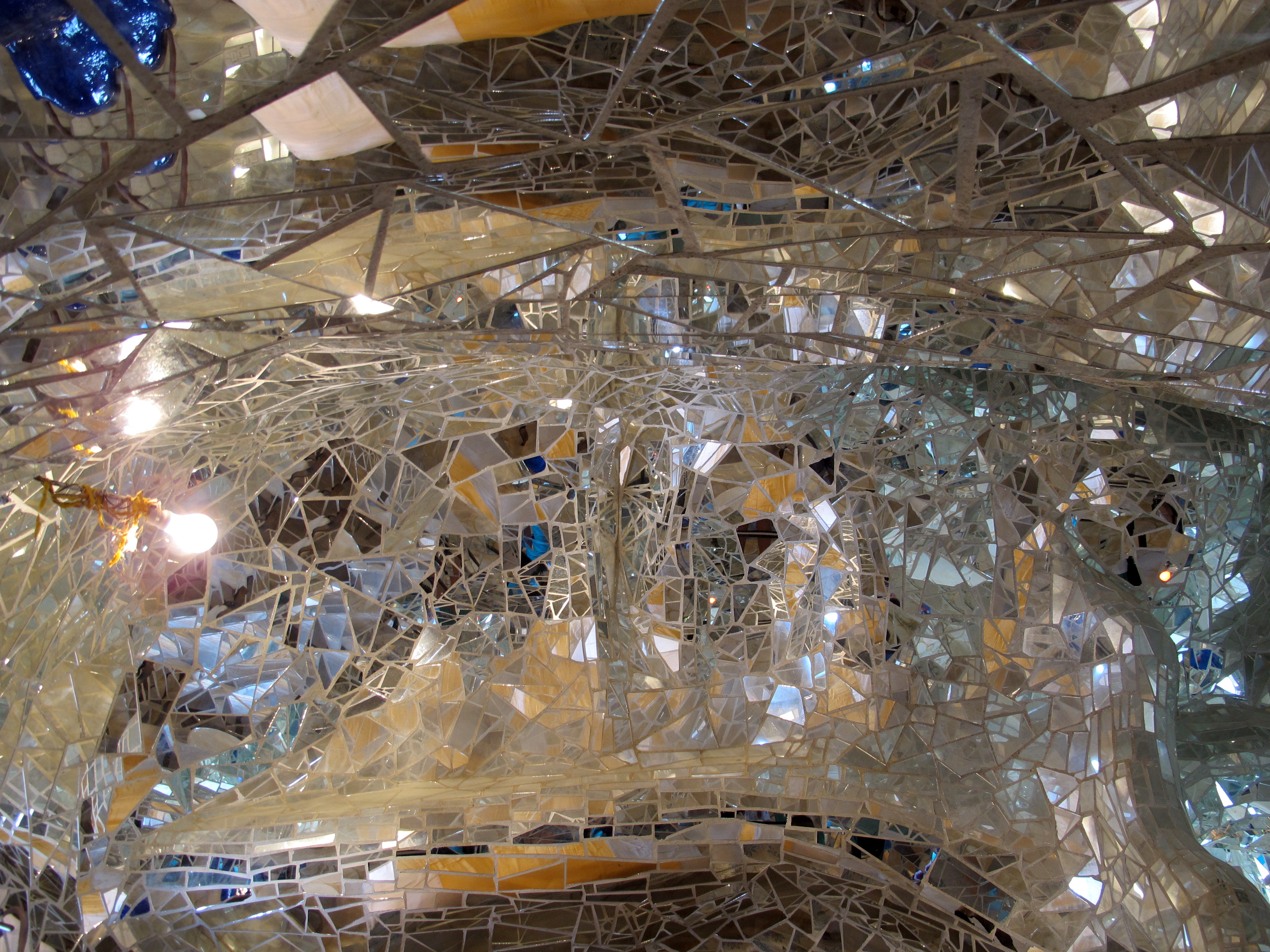
Mosaic

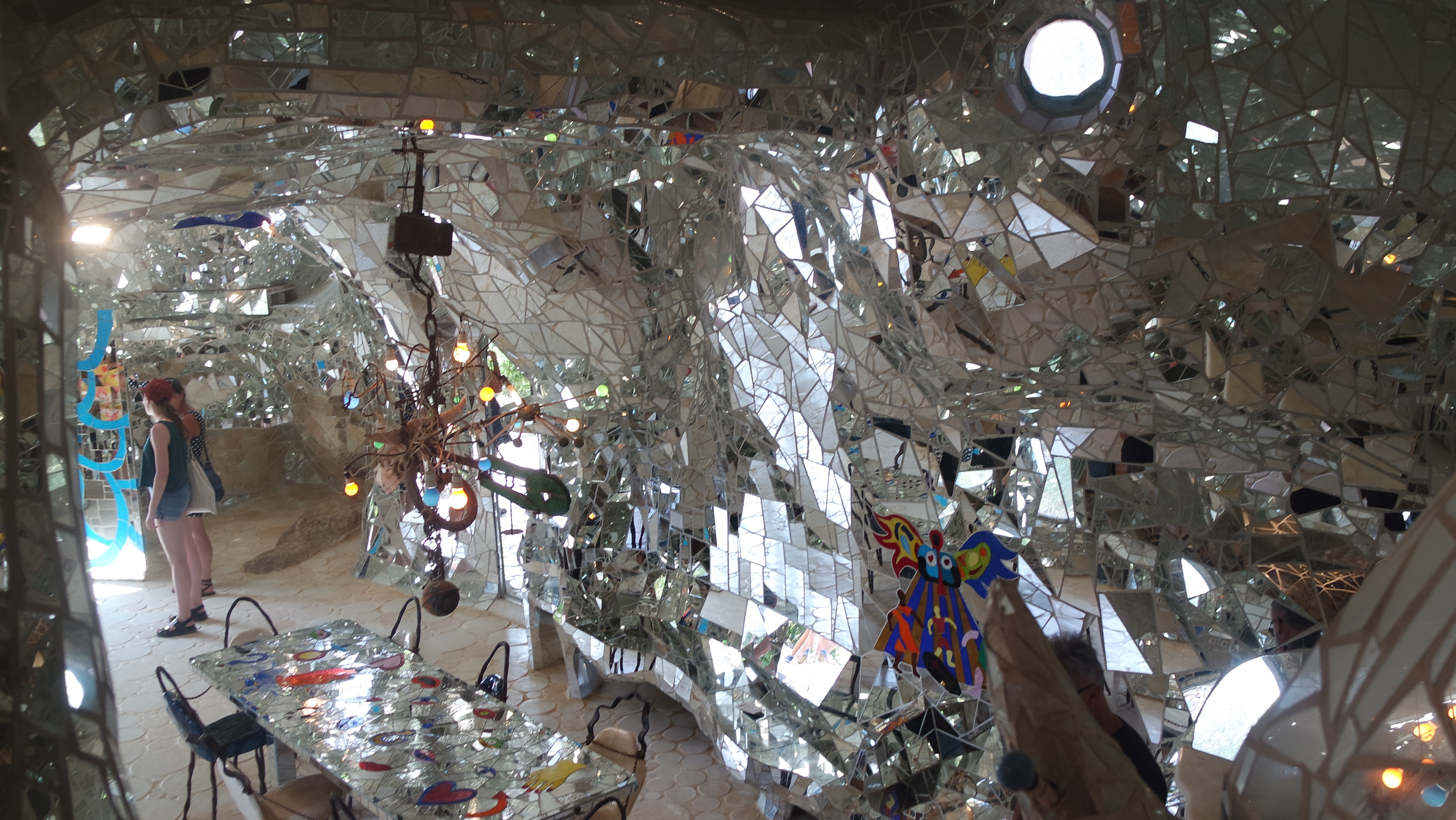
The Empress (internal view)

The Tarot Garden (Italian: Il Giardino dei Tarocchi, French: Le Jardin des Tarots) is a sculpture garden based on the esoteric tarot, created by the French-American artist Niki de Saint Phalle (1930–2002) in Pescia Fiorentina, località Garavicchio, in the municipality of Capalbio, province of Grosseto, Tuscany, Italy. The park was opened to the public in 1998.

== History ==
Niki de Saint Phalle, inspired by Antoni Gaudí´s Parc Güell in Barcelona, and Parco dei Mostri in Bomarzo, as well as Palais Idéal by Ferdinand Cheval, and Watts Towers by Simon Rodia, decided to make something similar in design for her monumental sculpture park based on the Tarot. In 1979, she acquired some land on top of an Etruscan ruin in Garavicchio, Tuscany, about 100 kilometres (62 mi) north-west of Rome along the coast.

There she built the Giardino dei Tarocchi, containing twenty-two monumental figures representing her idea of the greater Mysteries of the Tarot, constructed of reinforced concrete and covered with mirrors and ceramic mosaic.

Some of the larger sculptural figures can be walked through; the artist herself lived inside the sphinx-like Empress for several years during the construction of the garden.

== Selected publications ==
- Niki de Saint Phalle, Giulio Pietrocharchi: The Tarot Garden: The Tarot Garden. Benteli Zurich 1997, ISBN 978-3716510926.
- Niki de Saint Phalle: The Tarot Garden: Giardino Del Tarrochi. Edizioni Charta, Milano 1997, ISBN 978-8881581672.
- Carla Schulz Hoffman: Niki de Saint Phalle. Bilder-Figuren-Phantastische Garten. Prestel, Bonn 2008, ISBN 978-3791339832.
- Philip Carr-Gomm: Sacred Places. Quercus Publishing, London 2008, ISBN 978-0857383440.
- Jill Johnston, Marella Caracciolo Chia, Giulio Pietromarchi: Niki de Saint Phalle and The Tarot Garden. Benteli, Zurich 2010, ISBN 978-3716515372.
