= Pescia Fiorentina =

- Frazione
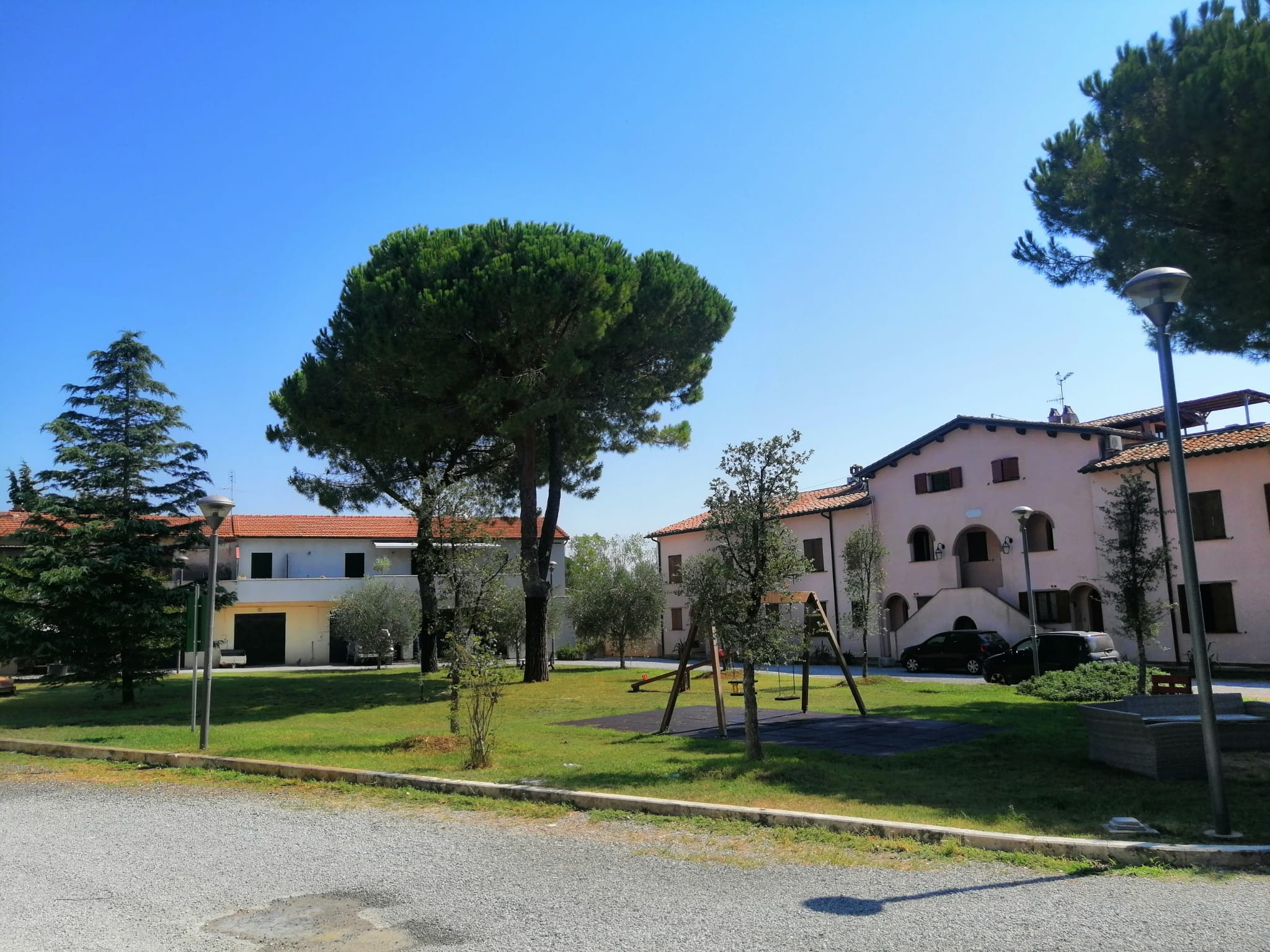

- Location of Pescia Fiorentina in Italy
- Coordinates: 42°26′8″N 11°28′40″E
- Country: Italy
- Region: Tuscany
- Province: Grosseto (GR)
- Comune: Capalbio
- Elevation: 75 m (246 ft)

Population (2011)
  - Total: 29
- Time zone: UTC+1 (CET)
  - Summer (DST): UTC+2 (CEST)
- Postal code: 58011
- Dialing code: (+39) 0564

Pescia Fiorentina is a village in Tuscany, central Italy, administratively a frazione of the comune of Capalbio, province of Grosseto. At the time of the 2001 census, its population amounted to 37.

== Geography ==
Pescia Fiorentina is about 60 km (35 miles) from Grosseto and 6 km (3.5 miles) from Capalbio. It is situated in the plain of southern Maremma, in the valley of Fiora, between the hills of Capalbio and the Tyrrhenian Sea, on the border with the province of Viterbo, Lazio. It is located along the Provincial Road which links Capalbio to Chiarone Scalo.

== History ==
Pescia Fiorentina was an important industrial centre with furnaces and ironworks in the 16th century.

== Main sights ==
- Villa del Fontino (18th century) was the seat of customs between the Grand Duchy of Tuscany and the Papal States. The palace was then named after the families who lived there after the dismantling of customs: Boncompagni and Magrini. The palazzo was then transformed into a farmhouse hotel.
- Il Giardino dei Tarocchi (Tarot Garden), situated in the hamlet of Garavicchio, is a sculpture garden based on the esoteric tarot created by French artist Niki de Saint Phalle. The park was opened in 1998.

== Bibliography ==
- Santi, Bruno, ed. (2007). Guida storico-artistica alla Maremma: itinerari culturali nella provincia di Grosseto (in Italian). Texts and research by Cristina Gnoni Mavarelli. Siena: Nuova Immagine. ISBN 978-88-7145-093-3.
- Favilli, Fabiola (2011). Capalbio: alla scoperta del borgo e del territorio (in Italian). Arcidosso: Effigi. ISBN 978-88-6433-163-8.

== See also ==
- Borgo Carige
- Capalbio Scalo
- Chiarone Scalo
- Giardino, Capalbio
- La Torba
