= Chiarone Scalo =

- Frazione
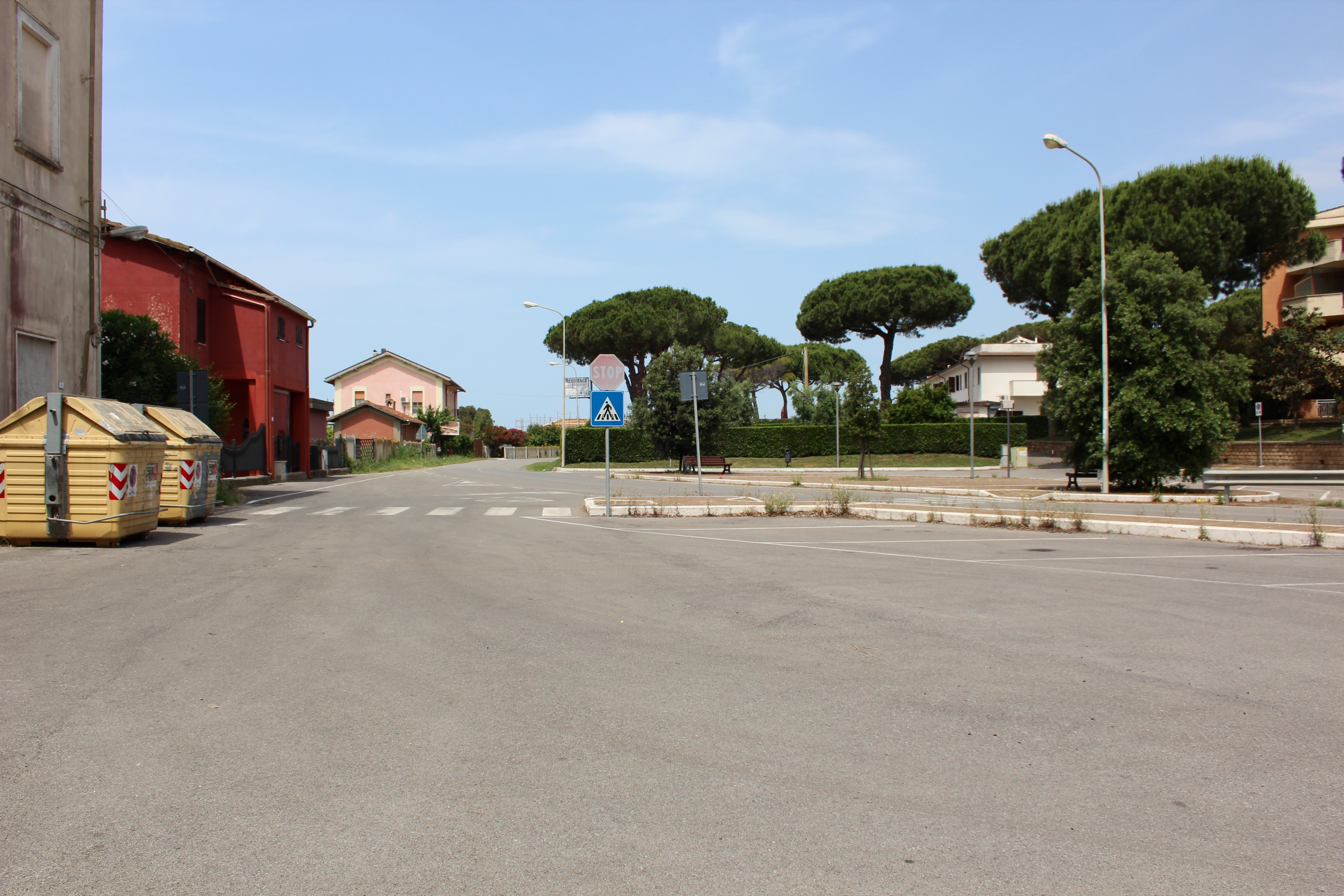

- Location of Chiarone Scalo in Italy
- Coordinates: 42°23′17″N 11°26′46″E
- Country: Italy
- Region: Tuscany
- Province: Grosseto (GR)
- Comune: Capalbio
- Elevation: 5 m (16 ft)

Population (2011)
  - Total: 23
- Time zone: UTC+1 (CET)
  - Summer (DST): UTC+2 (CEST)
- Postal code: 58011
- Dialing code: (+39) 0564

Chiarone Scalo is a village in Tuscany, central Italy, administratively a frazione of the comune of Capalbio, province of Grosseto. At the time of the 2001 census its population amounted to 18.

== Geography ==
Chiarone Scalo is about 58 km from Grosseto and 11 km from Capalbio, and it is situated in the plain of southern Maremma between the hills of Capalbio and the Tyrrhenian Sea, next to the mouth of the river Chiarone, which marks the border between the provinces of Grosseto and Viterbo, Lazio. Chiarone Scalo is the southernmost village in Tuscany.

== History ==
The small town was born in the late 18th century as border point and customs between the Grand Duchy of Tuscany and the Papal States and it developed in the next century with the opening of the railway station (1867). With the Maremman Riforma agraria (land reform) in the 1950s it became the centre for various newborn rural villages which converge on it: the hamlet of Selva Nera and several others named after the letters of the alphabet (Centro A, Centro B, Centro C, Centro D, Centro E, Centro F, Centro G, Centro H, Centro I, Centro L, Centro M).

== Main sights ==
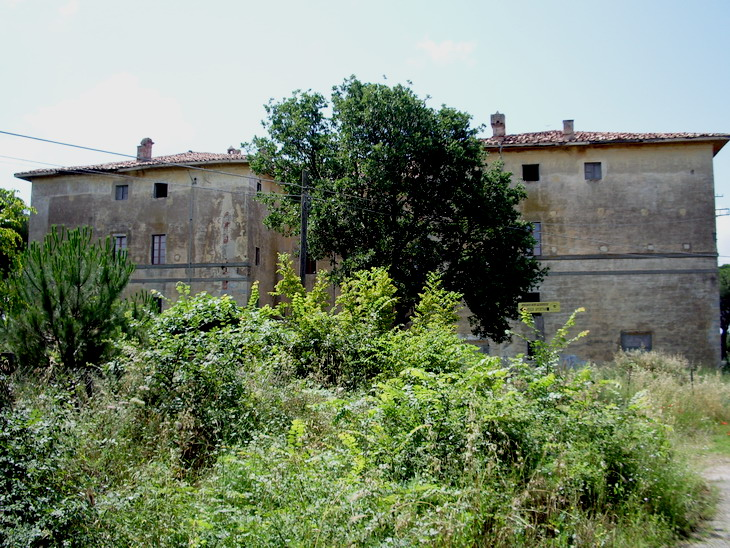
The Palazzo del Chiarone.

- Palazzo del Chiarone, or Palazzo Boncompagni, situated along the Via Aurelia, is preceded by a portico which was seat of customs between Tuscany and the Papal States. The palace was then named after the family who lived there after the dismantling of customs. The palazzo is divided into nearly a hundred rooms and among them there were also the papal apartment, stables and a prison.
- Tower of Selva Nera is a defense coastal tower situated on the road between Chiarone and Capalbio Scalo, it was built in the late 16th century by the Medicis and abandoned in the mid-19th century. The tower is now used for residential purposes.

== Transportation ==
Chiarone Scalo is located along the Via Aurelia highway which links Grosseto to Rome and it is easily reached from the Tirrenica railway line thanks to its own station.

== Bibliography ==
- Fabiola Favilli, Capalbio. Alla scoperta del borgo e del territorio, Arcidosso, C&P Adver Effigi, 2011.

== See also ==
- Borgo Carige
- Capalbio Scalo
- Giardino, Capalbio
- La Torba
- Pescia Fiorentina
