= Sarah Gott =

American winemaker

- Education: University of California, Davis
- Occupation: Winemaker

Sarah Gott is an American winemaker.

== Personal life and education ==
Gott originally attended the University of California, Davis with the intention of studying veterinary medicine. With a longtime love for food and wine, she opted to study enology instead at the university. She received a Bachelor of Science in fermentation science in 1993. She is married to winemaker Joel Gott. They have three children. She enjoys participating in triathlons.

== Career ==
After graduation, Gott interned at Joseph Phelps Winery in St. Helena, California, Gloria Ferrer in Sonoma, California, and Wirra Wirra in Australia. She completed these internships in three years. While at Joseph Phelps, she was mentored by Craig Williams and worked in the winery labs as an assistant enologist. She became assistant winemaker at Joseph Phelps in 1994. In 2002, she became head winemaker. In 2004, she started working as the first full-time winemaker at Quintessa Wine. Gott left Phelps, where she was responsible for producing 90,000 cases of various wines each year, to create a small batch of wine at Quintessa, totaling 10,000 cases.

Two years later, in 2004, she started working as a winemaker at Oakville East Wine Company. She has provided consulting services for Clif Family Winery and Blackbird Vineyards. The first Merlot she created for Blackbird Vineyards, a 2003 Merlot, was awarded 95-points from Vintrust. Today, Gott serves as the Director of Winemaking at Joel Gott Wines, which she co-runs with her husband, winemaker Joel Gott.
