= Chiarone railway station =

Railway station in Italy

Chiarone
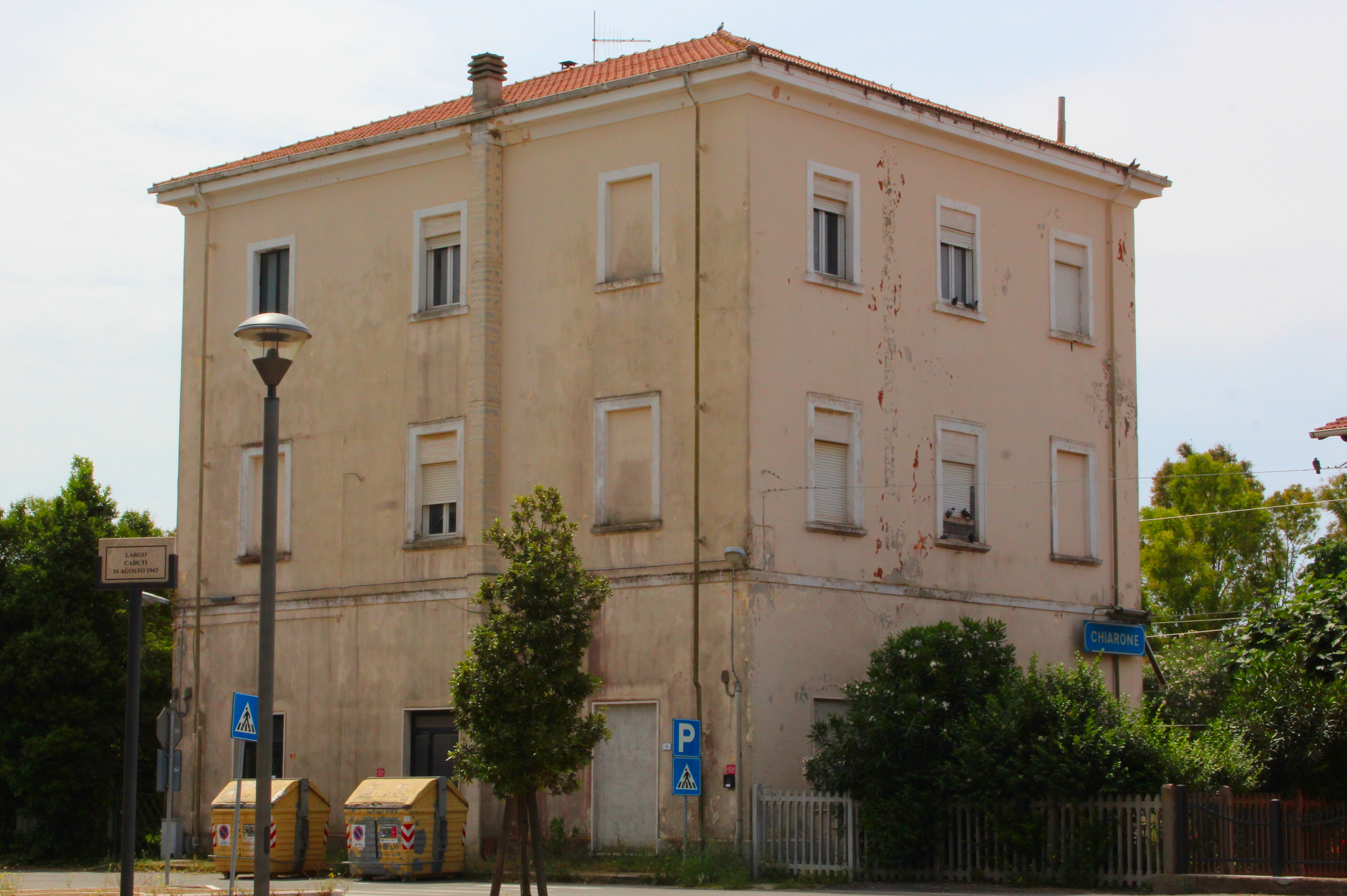

General information
- Location: Strada Pescia Fiorentina-Chiarone; Chiarone Scalo 58011; Capalbio, Grosseto, Tuscany; Italy
- Coordinates: 42°23′16″N 11°26′46″E
- Operator: Rete Ferroviaria Italiana; Trenitalia
- Line: Tirrenica
- Tracks: 2

History
- Opened: 27 June 1867; 159 years ago
- Closed: Early 2000s
Location
- Location within Tuscany Location within Italy

Chiarone railway station is a disused Italian railway station on the Tirrenica railway line, located in the village of Chiarone Scalo, in the municipality of Capalbio, Province of Grosseto, Tuscany.

It is the southernmost railway station in Tuscany, located at the border with the Lazio region.

== History ==
The station opened on 27 June 1867 along with the section of the Pisa–Rome railway from Nunziatella (Capalbio) to Civitavecchia, connecting Tuscany with the Papal States.

In the early 2000s, the station was closed due to low passenger traffic and is only served by bus routes.

== See also ==
- History of rail transport in Italy
- List of railway stations in Tuscany
- Rail transport in Italy
- Railway stations in Italy
