= Giardino, Capalbio =

Giardino
- Frazione
- Location of Giardino in Italy
- Coordinates: 42°26′18″N 11°20′16″E
- Country: Italy
- Region: Tuscany
- Province: Grosseto (GR)
- Comune: Capalbio
- Elevation: 12 m (39 ft)

Population (2011)
  - Total: 18
- Time zone: UTC+1 (CET)
  - Summer (DST): UTC+2 (CEST)
- Postal code: 58011
- Dialing code: (+39) 0564

Giardino is a rural area in Tuscany, central Italy, administratively a frazione of the comune of Capalbio, province of Grosseto. At the time of the 2001 census its population amounted to 15.

== Geography ==
Giardino is about 50 km from Grosseto and 12 km from Capalbio. It is situated in the plain of southern Maremma between the hills of Capalbio, Manciano and Orbetello, and the Tyrrhenian Sea. The valley of Giardino is commonly known as Valle d'Oro (Golden Valley) and it is surrounded by various heights of mountains, of which the highest peaks are those of Monte Nebbiello (127 meters), Poggio Imperiale (147 m), Poggio dei Butteri (154 m), Poggio Farletta (180 m) and Poggio Capalbiaccio (238 m).

== History ==
Recent archaeological excavations proved that the valley was inhabited by the Etruscans dependent on the city of Vulci, as well as the Romans, as the hinterland of the colony of Cosa.

The modern hamlet of Giardino was built in the 1950s as a result of the riforma agraria (land reform) in Maremma.

== Main sights ==
- Church of Sacro Cuore di Gesù (20th century), the main parish church of the village, was built in 1959.
- Archaeological Park of Valle d'Oro, an archaeological site full of Roman relics like the remains of aqueducts, villas, houses, fortifications.

== Bibliography ==
- Fabiola Favilli, Capalbio. Alla scoperta del borgo e del territorio, Arcidosso, C&P Adver Effigi, 2011.
- Mariagrazia Celuzza, Cecilia Luzzetti, Valle d'Oro. Parco archeologico e paesaggistico. Studio di fattibilità, Arcidosso, Effigi 2013.

== See also ==
- Borgo Carige
- Capalbio Scalo
- Chiarone Scalo
- La Torba
- Pescia Fiorentina
