= La Torba =

- Frazione
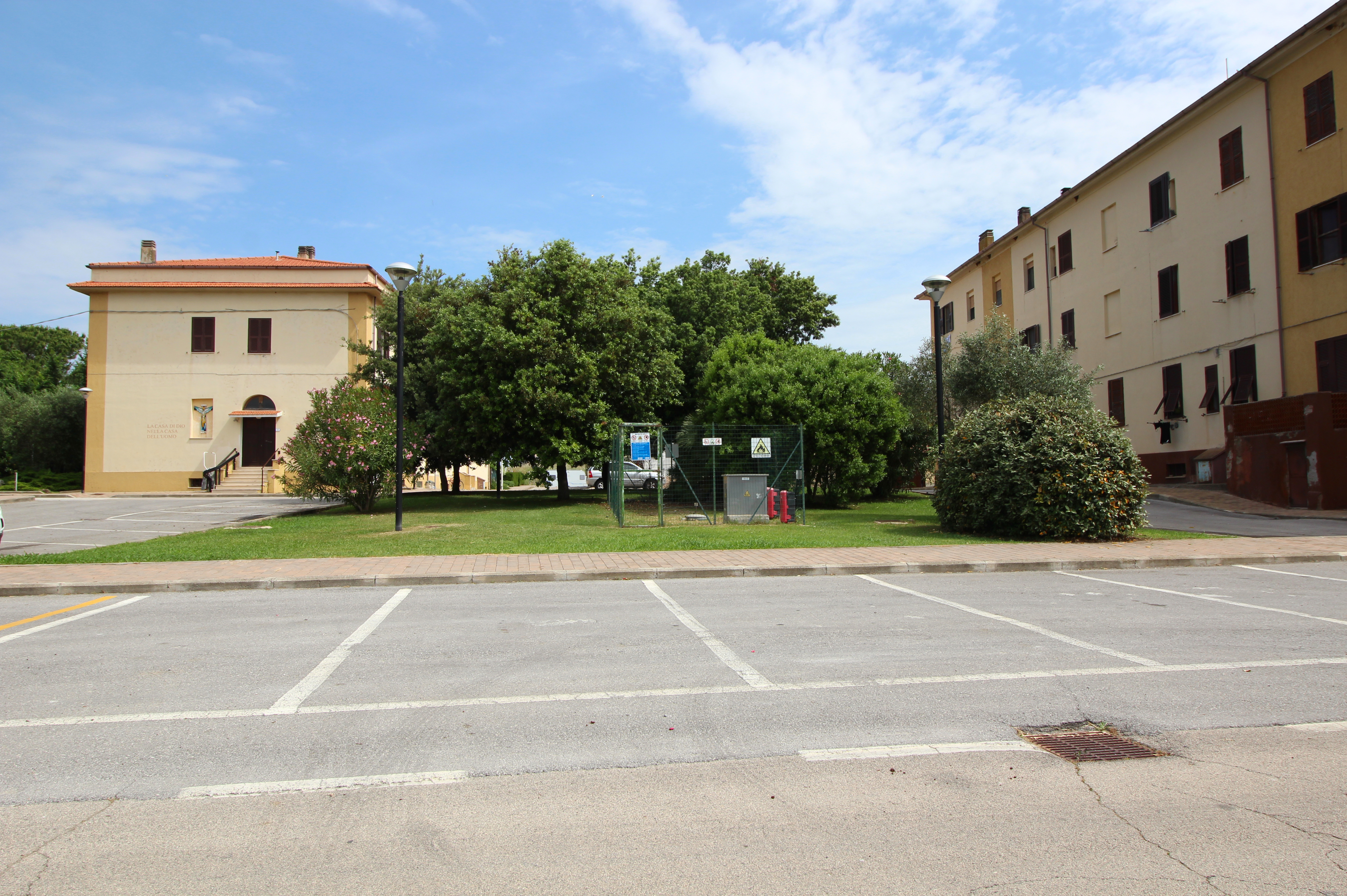

- Location of La Torba in Italy
- Coordinates: 42°24′50″N 11°19′35″E
- Country: Italy
- Region: Tuscany
- Province: Grosseto (GR)
- Comune: Capalbio
- Elevation: 7 m (23 ft)

Population (2011)
  - Total: 186
- Demonym: Torbieri
- Time zone: UTC+1 (CET)
  - Summer (DST): UTC+2 (CEST)
- Postal code: 58011
- Dialing code: (+39) 0564

La Torba is a village in Tuscany, central Italy, administratively a frazione of the comune of Capalbio, province of Grosseto. At the time of the 2001 census its population amounted to 209.

== Geography ==
La Torba is about 50 km from Grosseto and 12 km from Capalbio. It is situated in the plain of southern Maremma between the hills of Capalbio and the Tyrrhenian Sea, at the end of the valley of Giardino (Valle d'Oro), along the Via Aurelia highway. Its beaches are known for black and dark grey-coloured sand, due to the abundant presence of ferrous metals in the subsoil.

== Main sights ==
- Chapel of Sacro Cuore di Gesù (20th century), the main church of the village, it is included in the parish of Giardino.
- Farm of Nunziatella (19th century), old farmhouse with a manor house and a chapel, it is situated along the Via Aurelia highway.
- Villa Settefinestre, situated on the border with the comune of Orbetello, it dates back to the Roman period.

== Bibliography ==
- Fabiola Favilli, Capalbio. Alla scoperta del borgo e del territorio, Arcidosso, C&P Adver Effigi, 2011.

== See also ==
- Borgo Carige
- Capalbio Scalo
- Chiarone Scalo
- Giardino, Capalbio
- Pescia Fiorentina
