= Borgo Carige =

- Frazione
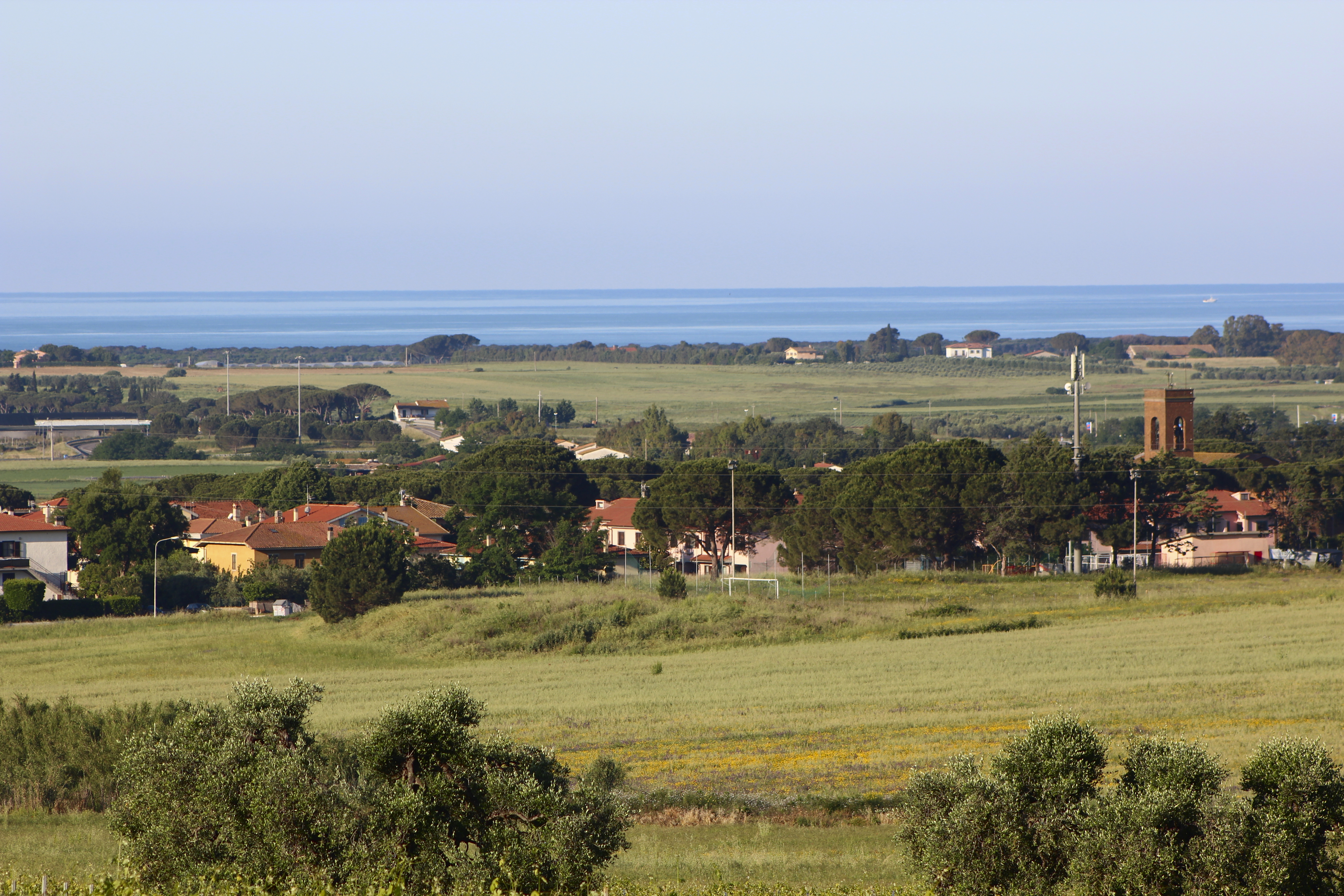
- Panorama of Borgo Carige

- Location of Borgo Carige in Italy
- Coordinates: 42°25′30″N 11°25′5″E
- Country: Italy
- Region: Tuscany
- Province: Grosseto (GR)
- Comune: Capalbio
- Elevation: 21 m (69 ft)

Population (2011)
  - Total: 352
- Time zone: UTC+1 (CET)
  - Summer (DST): UTC+2 (CEST)
- Postal code: 58011
- Dialing code: (+39) 0564

Borgo Carige is a village in Tuscany, central Italy, and a frazione of the municipality of Capalbio, in the province of Grosseto. At the time of the 2001 census, it had a population of 229.

The village is located about 54 km south of Grosseto and 5 km from Capalbio, in the southern Maremma plain between the Capalbio hills and the Tyrrhenian Sea, along the Via Aurelia, the main coastal highway linking Grosseto and Rome. Borgo Carige was established in the 1950s as part of the agrarian reform.

== Geography ==
Borgo Carige is located at the southern edge of the Maremma of Grosseto, in the coastal and near-coastal area known as the Silver Coast (Costa d'Argento).

The village lies at 21 m above sea level in a flat area below Poggio Monteti (421 m) and the Capalbio hills, between the Fosso di Gabriellaccio to the northwest, the Chiarone to the southeast, and the Canale della Bassa to the south. Borgo Carige borders Capalbio to the north, Pescia Fiorentina to the east, Capalbio Scalo to the south, and Giardino to the west.

== History ==
The Capalbio plain remained sparsely populated for centuries, and the settlement developed only in the 20th century following the complete reclamation of the Maremma plain and the agrarian reform launched in 1951. The locality of Carige was selected for the construction of a new village intended to serve as a service and social centre for approximately 400 farms spread across a rural area of about 5,000 hectares between Capalbio and the coast.

Construction began in July 1956, and the village was inaugurated on 3 May 1958. The original core consisted of the parish church and rectory, a social building with a bar and shops, a post office with a medical clinic, an elementary school, a nursery, a residential building for teachers, and a movie theatre.

== Main sights ==
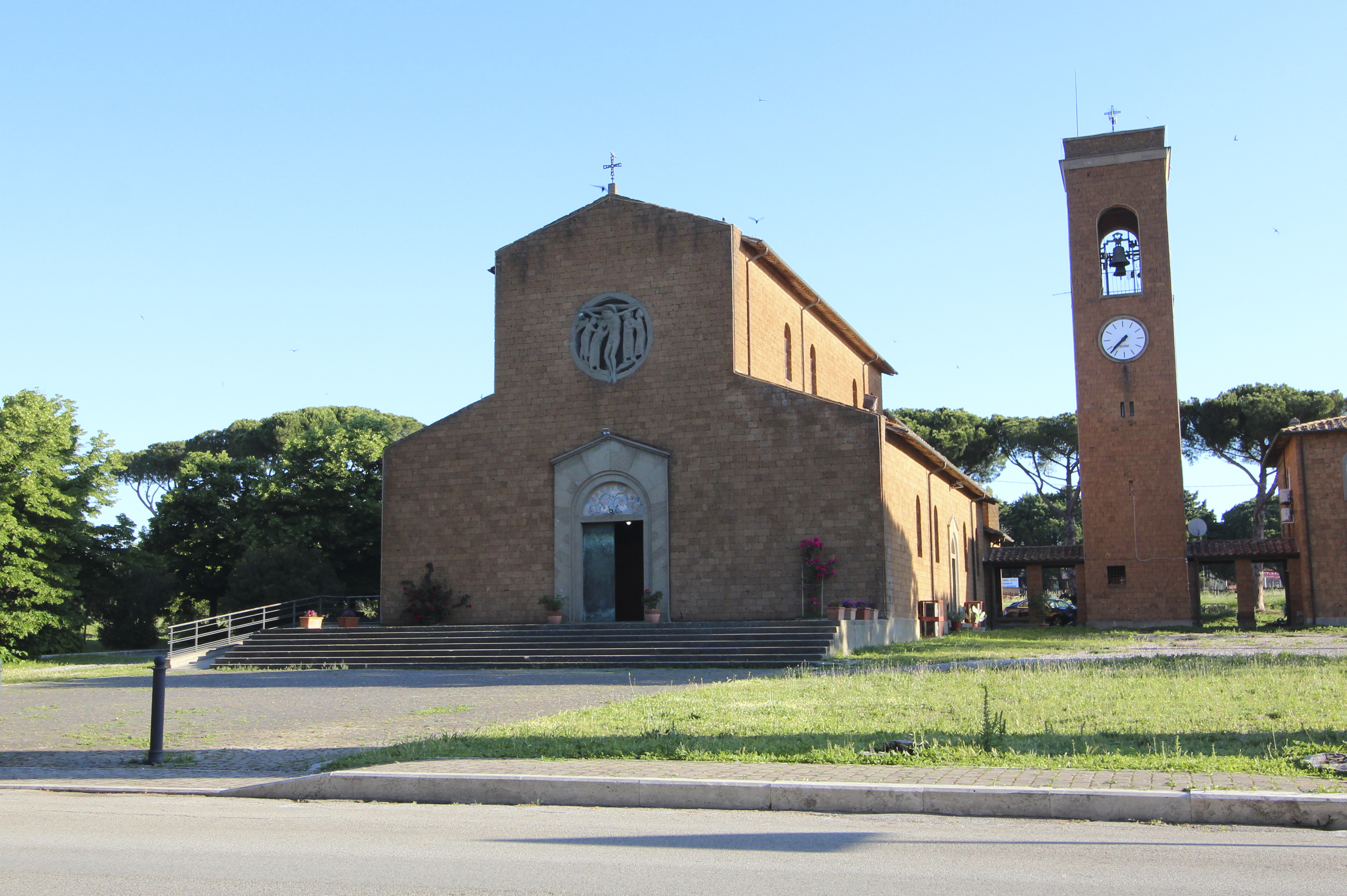
The church of the Immaculate Heart

=== Church of the Immaculate Heart ===
The church of the Immaculate Heart (Cuore Immacolato) is the parish church of Borgo Carige, located in the village's main square. Its design was commissioned on 30 October 1952 to Riccardo Medici, brother of Giuseppe Medici, then president of the Ente Maremma. The final project was presented in August 1955. Construction began in 1956, and the church was inaugurated on 13 May 1958, with the altar consecrated by Bishop Pacifico Giulio Vanni. Restoration and refurbishment works were carried out between 1993 and 1998.

Built in a Romanesque Revival style with a three-nave plan of exposed Viterbo tuff, the church features a south-facing portal decorated by Carlo Testi and a rose window depicting a Crucifixion by sculptor Alfio Castelli. A secondary east-facing portal also bears decorations by Testi. The interior contains a bronze Via Crucis by Castelli, a baptismal font, holy water stoups in Siena yellow marble, and an apse painted with prophets, evangelists, saints, and biblical scenes centred on the Immaculate Conception. A former choir gallery was later converted into a chapel dedicated to the Blessed Sacrament, and a bell tower with five bells rises beside the rectory.

=== Monument to the twinning ===
Located in Piazza della Repubblica, opposite the church, the monument is dedicated to the twinning between Capalbio and the Abruzzo municipality of Trasacco. It features a geometric travertine sculpture on which the two municipal coats of arms are displayed.

== Education ==
Public educational services in Borgo Carige are provided by the "Pietro Aldi" Institute of Manciano. The village hosts a nursery school in Via Torino, while the local primary school was closed in 2019.

== Sources ==
- Catalani, Barbara; Del Francia, Marco (2008). Architettura contemporanea del paesaggio toscano. Florence: Edifir.
- Catalani, Barbara; Del Francia, Marco; Tombari, Giovanni (2011). Itinerari di architettura contemporanea. Grosseto e provincia. Pisa: ETS.
- Crispolti, Enrico; Mazzanti, Anna; Quattrocchi, Luca, eds. (2005). Arte in Maremma nella prima metà del Novecento. Milan: Silvana Editoriale.
- Favilli, Fabiola (2011). Capalbio. Alla scoperta del borgo e del territorio. Arcidosso: C&P Adver Effigi.
- Simoncelli, Antonio Valentino (1989). La Riforma fondiaria in Maremma (1950-1965). Grosseto. pp. 123–126.

== See also ==
- Capalbio Scalo
- Chiarone Scalo
- Giardino, Capalbio
- La Torba
- Pescia Fiorentina
