= Capalbio Scalo =

- Frazione
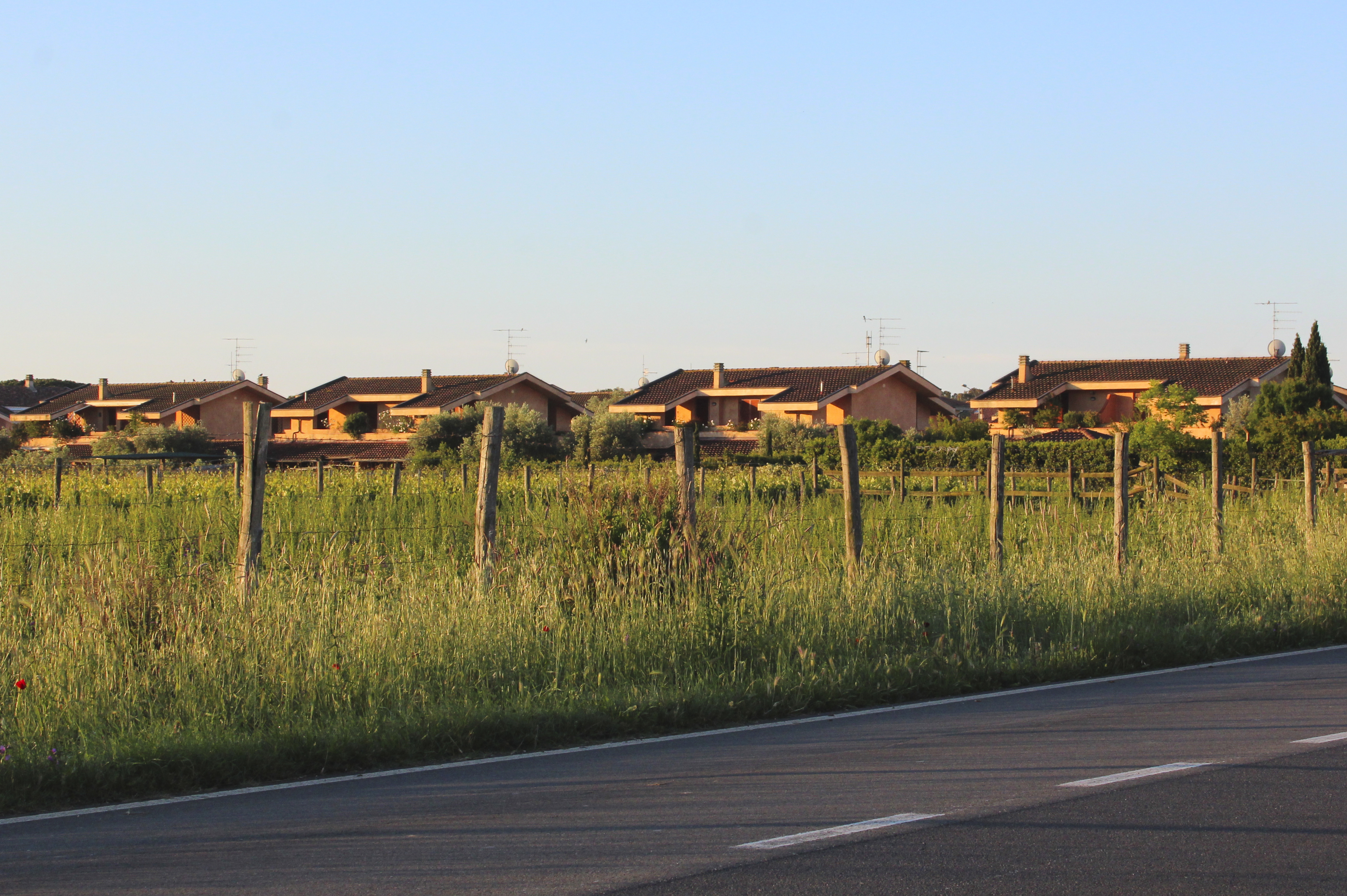

- Location of Capalbio Scalo in Italy
- Coordinates: 42°24′32″N 11°22′18″E
- Country: Italy
- Region: Tuscany
- Province: Grosseto (GR)
- Comune: Capalbio
- Elevation: 8 m (26 ft)

Population (2011)
  - Total: 551
- Demonym: Capalbiesi
- Time zone: UTC+1 (CET)
  - Summer (DST): UTC+2 (CEST)
- Postal code: 58011
- Dialing code: (+39) 0564

Capalbio Scalo is a village in Tuscany, central Italy, administratively a frazione of the municipality of Capalbio, province of Grosseto. It had a population of 551 as of 2011, making it the most populous hamlet.

== Geography ==
Capalbio Scalo is located about 50 km south of Grosseto and 9 km southwest of Capalbio, in the plain of southern Maremma, between the Capalbio hills and the Tyrrhenian Sea.

The village is situated near the northern shore of Lake Burano, separated from it by the railway line. The lake and its surroundings were first designated a wetland of international importance under the Ramsar Convention in 1977, before becoming a state nature reserve in 1980. Lake Burano is a brackish lagoon with an average depth of about one metre, separated from the Tyrrhenian Sea by a narrow dune belt, and represents one of the best-preserved coastal areas in the region.

== History ==
Capalbio Scalo developed in the second half of the 19th century around the railway station, inaugurated in 1885 on the shores of Lake Burano, which was built after the closure of an earlier station at Nunziatella in 1867. The settlement expanded mainly during the 20th century, particularly after the 1951 land reform, and became the main inhabited centre of the coastal area of the municipality due to its location between the railway and the Via Aurelia.

== Main sights ==
=== Parish church ===
The church of Santa Maria Goretti is the parish church of Capalbio Scalo. Established in 1986, the parish was created from territory formerly belonging to Borgo Carige, and the church was consecrated on 6 September 1986 by Bishop Eugenio Binini. The building has a Latin cross plan, a façade with an oculus above the main portal and a raised pediment, and is constructed using local stone.

=== Coastal fortifications ===
The Buranaccio Tower, located on the southern shore of Lake Burano, was built around the mid-16th century and served as the southernmost defensive outpost of the State of the Presidi, standing on the border with the Grand Duchy of Tuscany and the Papal States. Slightly farther west along the coastline, towards the ferruginous beaches of Torba, stands Fort Macchiatonda, built by the Spanish during the 17th century and later decommissioned in the 19th century. It was used as a location in the 1969 film The Seed of Man by director Marco Ferreri.

== Transport ==
Capalbio Scalo is located along the Via Aurelia highway which links Grosseto to Rome. It is served by the Tirrenica railway line thanks to its own station.

== See also ==
- Borgo Carige
- Chiarone Scalo
- Giardino, Capalbio
- La Torba
- Pescia Fiorentina
