= Robb Report =

US magazine

- October 2016 cover highlighting forty years of Robb Report
- Editor: Paul Croughton (2018 to present)
- Former editors: Brett Anderson
- Categories: Lifestyle
- Frequency: Monthly
- Founded: 1976; 50 years ago
- Company: Penske Media Corporation
- Country: United States
- Based in: Los Angeles, California
- Language: English
- Website: robbreport.com
- ISSN: 0279-1447

The Robb Report is an American, English-language, luxury-lifestyle magazine featuring products, including automobiles, aviation, boating, real estate and watches. Founded in 1976, it is currently owned by Penske Media Corporation. It also distributes Muse by Robb Report, a luxury magazine targeting female readers.

== History ==
The Robb Report was founded in 1976 by Robert L "Rusty" White. Originally titled Twentieth Century Confederates, it began as a newsletter to sell his personal collection of Civil War memorabilia and Rolls-Royce automobiles. White distributed his newsletter to members of the Rolls-Royce Owners Club as mimeographed loose-leaf pages, and he provided a suede three-ring binder to paying subscribers. The publication matured into an advertorial, one of the first of its kind, catering to affluent clientele. The blend of advertising and editorial was broadcast to high-end, affluent consumers via advertisements in Architectural Digest.

In 2002, the "Robb Report" brand was sold for US$150 million to CurtCo Media, after which CurtCo was renamed Curtco Robb Media LLC. The Robb Report has partnered with Bespoke Collection to develop auction items for Auction Napa Valley. In 2014, Robb Report was acquired by a Detroit based private equity firm Rockbridge for an undisclosed amount, but estimated at $60 million by a journalist at New York Post. In 2017, Rockbridge created a joint venture for the Robb Report with Penske Media Corporation.

In April 2018, Robb Report launched Muse by Robb Report targeting female readership. The company publishes international versions of its magazine. In 2016, the number of international editions of Robb Report was sixteen.

== International editions ==
=== Operating ===
- 罗博报告 Robb Report (for China, since 2007)
- Robb Report Singapore (from 2008 to 2010; since 2012)
- Robb Report Türkiye (from 2008 to ?; since 2025)
- Robb Report Arabia (since 2009)
- Robb Report Vietnam (since 2011)
- Robb Report México (since 2014)
- Robb Report Malaysia (since 2014)
- Robb Report UK (since 2016)
- Robb Report Australia & New Zealand (since 2016)
- Robb Report Deutschland (since 2016)
- Robb Report Brasil (since 2018)
- Robb Report Sweden (since 2018)
- Robb Report Italia (since 2021)
- Robb Report Hong Kong (since 2022)
- Robb Report Monaco & Côte d’Azur (since 2023)
- Robb Report en Español (since 2025)
- Robb Report India (since 2025)
- Robb Report Philippines (since 2025)
- Robb Report Africa (since 2025)
- Robb Report Thailand (since 2026)
- Robb Report France (launching in 2027)

=== Defunct ===
- Robb Report España
- Robb Report Kazakhstan (until 2021)
- Robb Report Russia

== See also ==
- Departures
- Worth
