= Roberto Achával =

Background information
- Birth name: Oscar Aníbal Crudeli
- Born: November 11, 1930; Ingeniero White, Buenos Aires, Argentina
- Origin: Argentina
- Died: June 27, 1996 (aged 65)
- Occupation: Tango violinist
- Instrument: Violin

Oscar Aníbal Crudeli (November 11, 1930 – June 27, 1996), better known as Roberto Achával, was an Argentine tango violinist. He became well-known and popular in Argentina following his appearance on the Argentinian television show "Grandes Valores del Tango". He was a member of Aníbal Troilo's orchestra.

== Biography ==
Achával was born to Alejandro and Josefa Scalesi in Ingeniero White, Bahía Blanca, in the province of Buenos Aires. Later he married Juana Dodero, also known as La Negra. They had two children, Mirta and Leonel.

== Career ==
Achával enjoyed singing from an early age, and sang in a church choir during his childhood. However, encouraged by his father, he took up the violin at age five, under the guidance of his uncle, Aliveo Crudeli. Though short in stature, he played his instrument in churches and at weddings accompanying Schubert's Serenade or the Wedding March. In Ingeniero White, he joined the Aníbal Troncoso Bahia Blanca orchestra, directed by Luis Bonnat, who taught him to play accordion. These skills were later refined by Antonio Ríos.

Alternating between playing the violin and singing, Achával debuted as a vocalist in the Bahía Blanca orchestra. In 1967 he performed at the "Festival de la Falda", achieving second place among the vocal performers. Two years later he travelled to Buenos Aires, entering the "Grandes Valores del Tango" talent contest under his real name. Based on his performance he was selected from among the competitors and offered a contract for three years with Channel 9 television.

He later appeared at the El Bulín venue on Calle Ayacucho, sharing the bill with the orchestra of Aníbal Troilo. From 1971 to 1973 he featured at the Malena al Sur tango club in the San Telmo district, accompanied by the orchestra of Charlie Garcia, and very often took part in the presentations of Troilo who in 1975 invited him to his last solo show, staged at the Odeon Theatre. The following year he accomplished a tour of seventy cities in Brazil, covering the full season from March to December, together with Jorge Sobral and White Voices Sexteto Mayor. In 1977 he was a central figure at Mimo's club. He also sang in the Municipal Radio recitals, programs of Channel 7, and as guest artist with the orchestra of Osvaldo Piro, with which he made several recordings. His interpretation of the tango "They call you Malevo" by Aníbal Troilo and Homero Expósito was the title theme of the television series Malevo, written by Abel Santa Cruz and starring Rodolfo Bebán and Gabriela Gilli, broadcast on Channel 9 with great success between 1972 and 1974.
