= Douglas Thornley =

American architect

- Occupation: Architect
- Practice: Goring & Straja Architects
- Projects: Cuvaison, Lynmar Estate, Moggridge Residence
- Website: www.gasarchitects.com/home

Douglas Thornley is an American architect. He is a principal at Goring & Straja Architects in San Francisco, California in the United States. Previously, Thornley was a lead architect at Gould Evans Architects and Baum Thornley Architects prior to a merger with Gould Evans Architects. He has designed private residencies and wineries. His first winery work was in 1998. He is also known for his kitchen design in homes and commercial establishments, including a home designed by Joseph Eichler.

== Notable projects ==
- Cuvaison, Napa Valley and Calistoga, California
- Lynmar Estate, Sebastopol, California
- Moggridge Residence, Woodside, California
- Paraduxx Winery, Napa, California
- Brown Residence, San Francisco, California, 2005
- Ma(i)sonry Napa Valley, Yountville, California, 2008
