= Santiago Achával =

Argentine winemaker

Santiago Achával is an Argentine winemaker, and the founding partner and president of Achával-Ferrer Winery from founding in 1998 until 2013.

He founded Matervini in 2010, and serves as president and winemaker.

== Biography ==
Achával became interested in wine after taking weekend trips with friends to the Napa Valley while completing an MBA at Stanford in 1989. After completing his studies, he returned to Argentina and began his career as a winemaker.

Achaval-Ferrer wines have been highly ranked by Robert Parker, Wine Enthusiast and Wine Spectator.

== Other activities ==
2006 to Present: Consulting Winemaker for Vines of Mendoza and its Recuerdo wines

2007 to 2013: Winemaker for Hand of God Wines, Mendoza

2008 to Present: with the Madsen family, the Achavals founded The Farm Winery in Paso Robles, CA

== See also ==
- Recuerdo Wines
