= Capalbio railway station =

Railway station in Italy

Capalbio
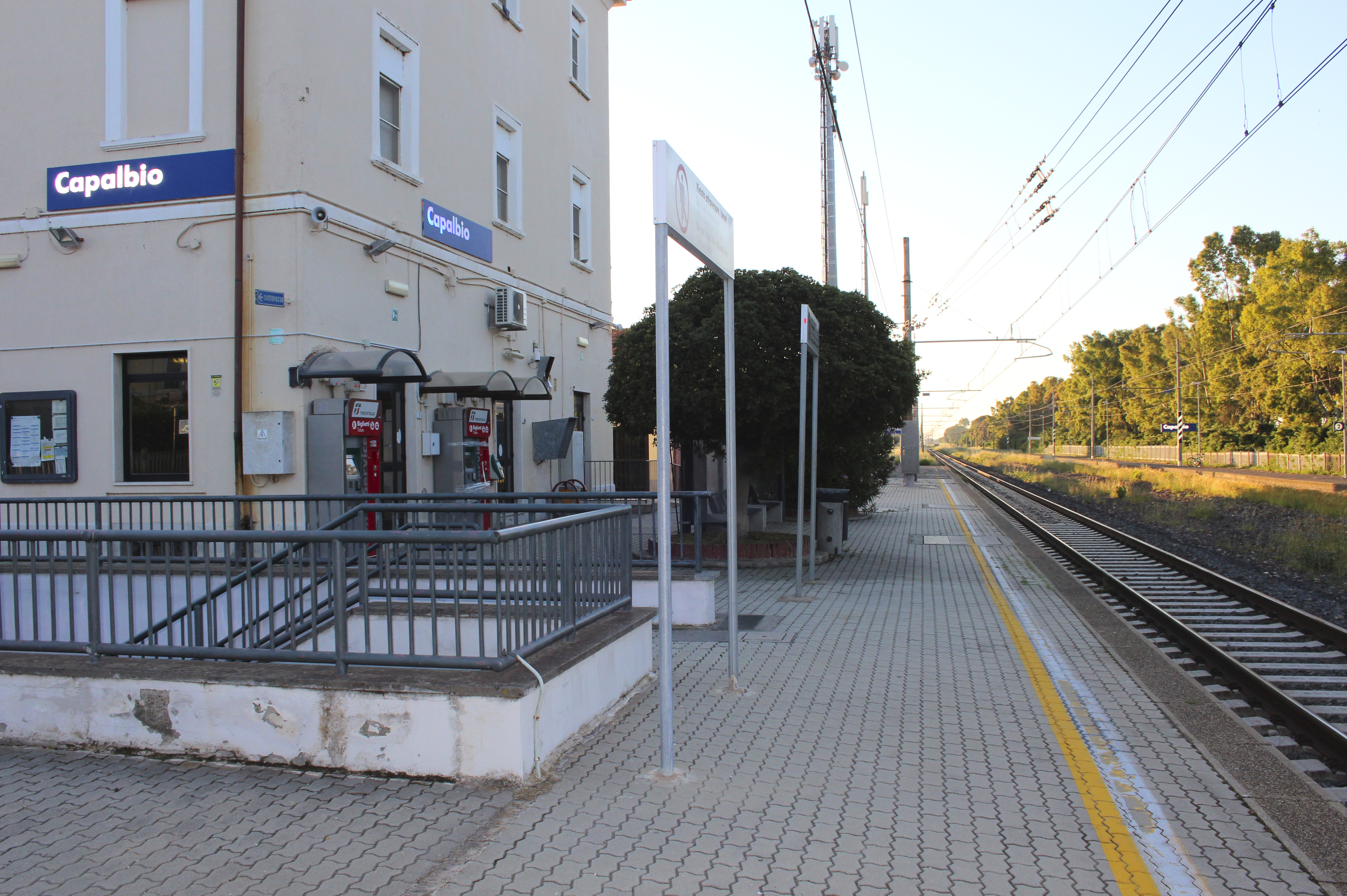

General information
- Location: Piazza Aldo Moro; Capalbio Scalo 58011; Capalbio, Grosseto, Tuscany; Italy
- Coordinates: 42°24′29.7″N 11°22′15.9″E
- Operator: Rete Ferroviaria Italiana; Trenitalia
- Line: Tirrenica
- Tracks: 3

Other information
- Classification: Silver

History
- Opened: 11 September 1885; 140 years ago
Location
- Location within Tuscany Location within Italy

Capalbio railway station is an Italian railway station on the Tirrenica railway line, located in the village of Capalbio Scalo, in the municipality of Capalbio, Province of Grosseto, Tuscany.

== History ==
An early station was inaugurated in the locality of Nunziatella as the railway's final stop of the section from Orbetello to the Papal States, which was opened on 3 August 1864. With the extension to Civitavecchia in 1867, the station was dismantled. The new station in Capalbio was inaugurated on 11 September 1885.

== Train services and movements ==
Regular passenger services to the station consist of regionale and regionale veloce services, which run frequently to Grosseto, Pisa Centrale, and Roma Termini.

== See also ==
- History of rail transport in Italy
- List of railway stations in Tuscany
- Rail transport in Italy
- Railway stations in Italy
