= Capalbio =

- Comune
- Comune di Capalbio
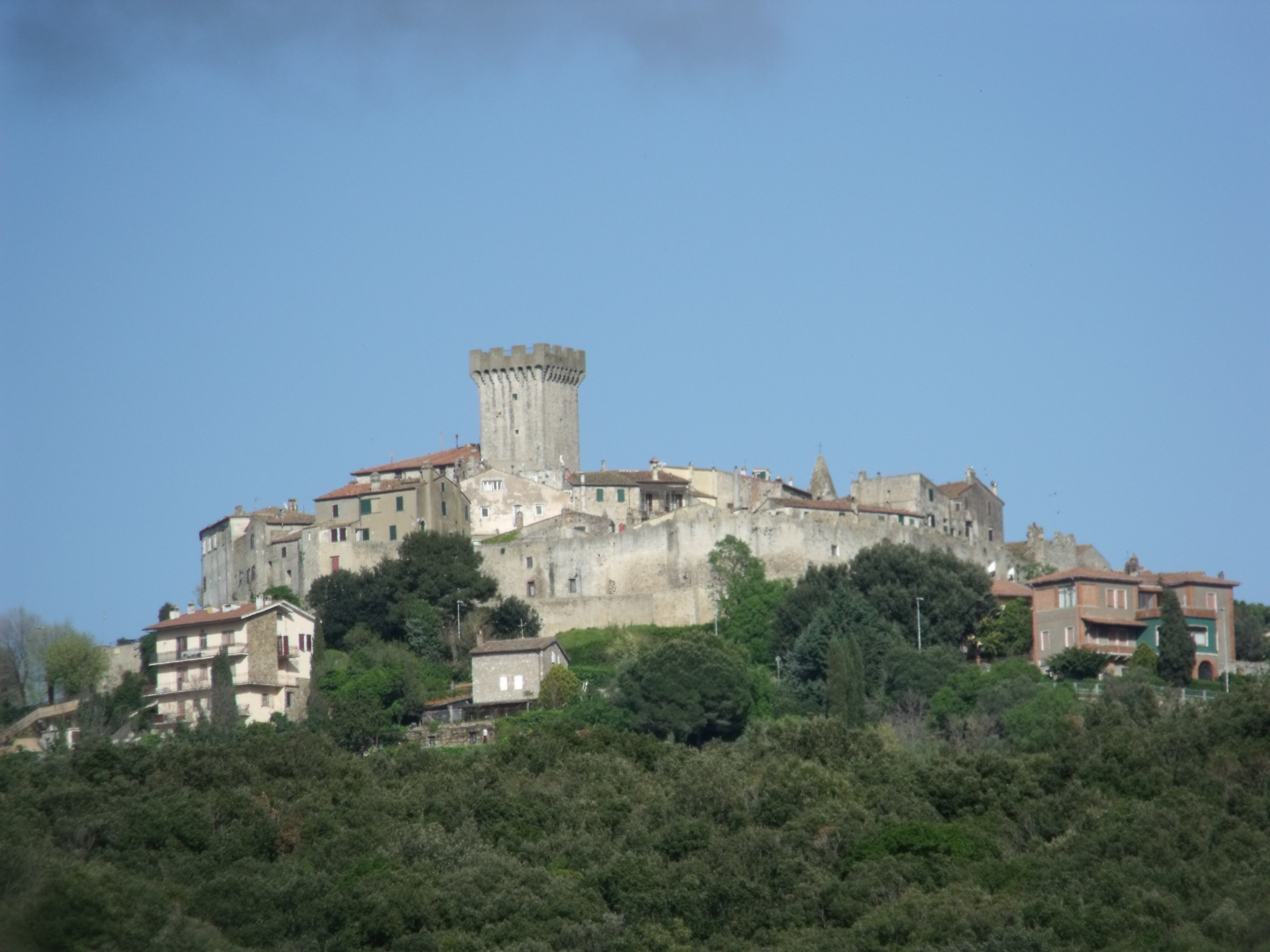
- View of Capalbio

- Coat of arms

- Location within Italy Location within Tuscany
- Coordinates: 42°27′15″N 11°25′21″E
- Country: Italy
- Region: Tuscany
- Province: Grosseto (GR)
- Frazioni: Borgo Carige, Capalbio Scalo, Chiarone Scalo, Giardino, La Torba, Pescia Fiorentina

Government
  - Mayor: Gianfranco Chelini (centre-left)

Area
  - Total: 187.36 km^{2} (72.34 sq mi)
- Elevation: 217 m (712 ft)

Population (31 August 2020)
  - Total: 3,864
  - Density: 20.62/km^{2} (53.41/sq mi)
- Demonym: Capalbiesi
- Time zone: UTC+1 (CET)
  - Summer (DST): UTC+2 (CEST)
- Postal code: 58011
- Dialing code: 0564
- Patron saint: St. Bernardino of Siena
- Saint day: May 20
- Website: Official website

Capalbio is a town and a comune in the Province of Grosseto in Tuscany, central Italy, located about 45 kilometres (28 mi) southeast of Grosseto. It is one of I Borghi più belli d'Italia ("The most beautiful villages of Italy").

Capalbio is a member of Cittaslow.

== History ==
The name derives probably from the Latin Caput Album or Campus Albus (White Cape or Field, respectively), due to the white alabaster stone dug in the area.

Capalbio is known for the first time in 805 CE, when it was donated to the Abbey of the Tre Fontane, near Rome, by Charlemagne. The possession was confirmed in 1161 by Pope Alexander III. Later it was under the Aldobrandeschi family, who were followed by Orvieto, the Republic of Siena and the Orsini, who built the Castle.

Conquered by the Spaniards in 1555. it was assigned to Cosimo I de' Medici as part of his new Grand Duchy of Tuscany. The city subsequently decayed and the area depopulated due to the presence of malaria.

It became part of the Kingdom of Italy in 1860, becoming an independent comune in 1960.

== Government ==
Frazioni

The municipality is formed by the municipal seat of Capalbio and the villages (frazioni) of Borgo Carige, Capalbio Scalo, Chiarone Scalo, Giardino, La Torba and Pescia Fiorentina.

== Economy ==
=== Capalbio DOC ===
The hills around the commune is part Denominazione di origine controllata (DOC) that produces red, white and rosé wines as a dessert Vin Santo style. The red and rosé wines are a blend of at least 50% Sangiovese with other local grape varieties, such as Abrusco, permitted to make up to 50% of the remainder. A varietal Sangiovese and Cabernet Sauvignon can also be made in the DOC provided that the stated variety makes up at least 85% of the blend and the wine has a minimum alcohol level of at least 12%. The white wines of the region are a blend of at least 50% Trebbiano with other local varieties permitted to make up the remaining 50%. Grapes destined for DOC production must be limited to a harvest yield of no more than 10 tonnes/hectare for the red wine and 12 tonnes/ha for the white and rosé. In order to attain DOC designation the finished white and rosé must attain a minimum alcohol level of 10.5% by volume, and 11% alcohol for the reds. The Vin Santo can be produced in both dry and sweet styles and must be aged for at least three years prior to release.

== Transports ==
- Capalbio railway station
- Chiarone railway station
