= Oscar Renteria =

American viticulturalist and California winemaker

Oscar Renteria is an American viticulturalist and California winemaker who specializes in the Napa Valley. Along with his father Salvador, Renteria runs Renteria Vineyard Management Co. which manages 1,800 acres (730 ha) for 27 wineries and Renteria Winery where the family produces wines under their own label.

== History ==
Renteria's father, Salvador, moved to Napa Valley in 1962 from Jalisco, Mexico. After working as a barber and pool shark, Salvador took a position working the vineyards for Sterling Vineyards in Napa where he quickly rose to crew leader due to his more advanced English-speaking abilities. From Sterling Salvador went on to pioneer several viticultural techniques in Napa Valley including different vine training systems and advance canopy management techniques.

In 1987, Salvador started Renteria Vineyard Management Co., with his son Oscar eventually assuming control of the operation upon Salvador's retirement. They are one of the largest vineyard managers in Napa and the largest in sub-regions like Pope Valley.
