= Sculpture garden =

Outdoor garden or park featuring artistic sculptures

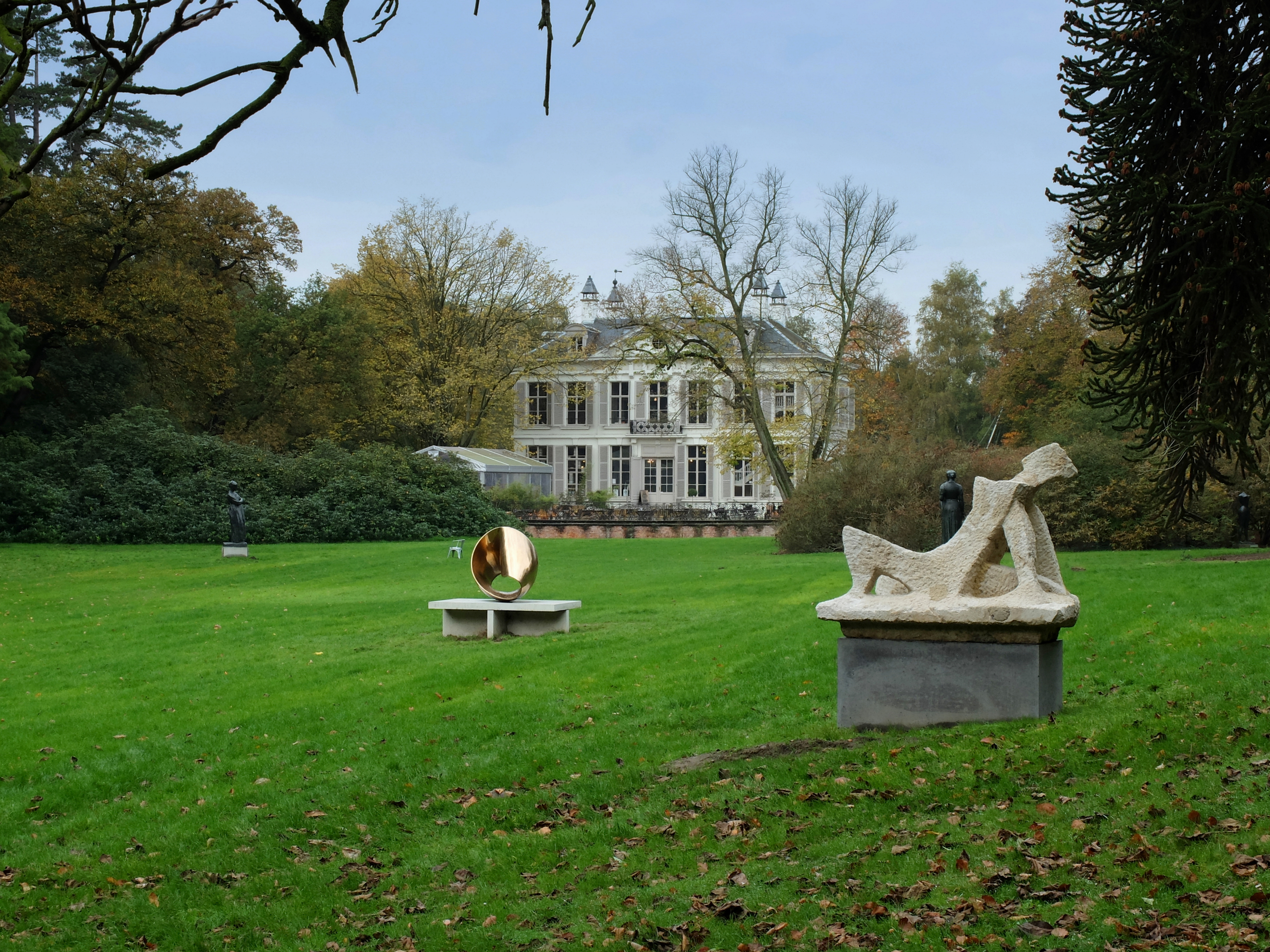
Middelheim Open Air Sculpture Museum, Antwerp, Belgium.

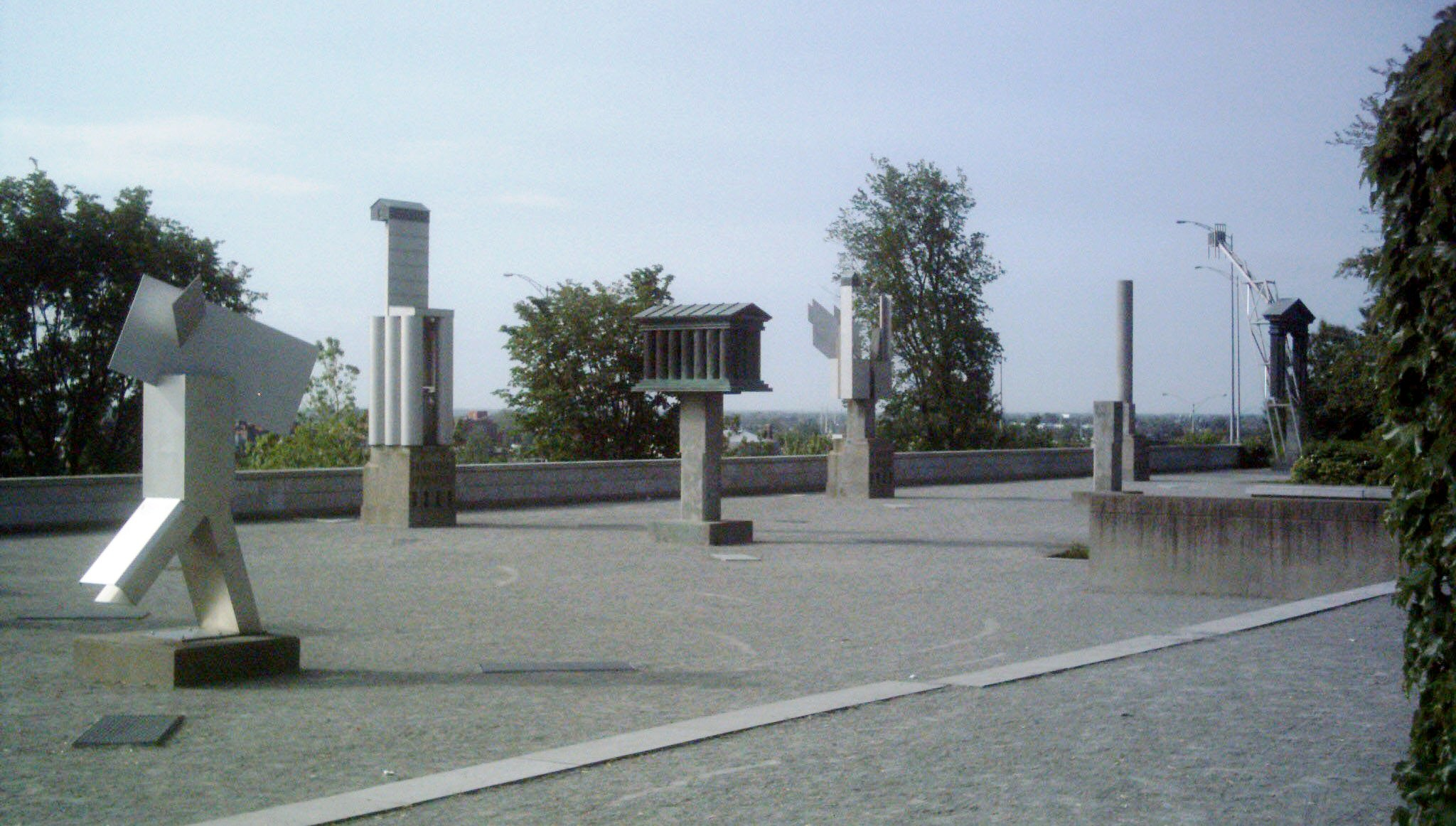
The Esplanade Ernest-Cormier, a sculpture garden in Montreal, Quebec, Canada, with Melvin Charney's work Colonnes allégoriques.

A sculpture garden or sculpture park is an outdoor garden or park which includes the presentation of sculpture, usually several permanently sited works in durable materials in landscaped surroundings.

A sculpture garden may be private, owned by a museum and accessible freely or for a fee, or public and accessible to all. Some cities own large numbers of public sculptures, some of which they may present together in city parks.

Exhibits range from individual, traditional sculptures to large site-specific installations. Sculpture gardens may also vary greatly in size and scope, either featuring the collected works of multiple artists, or the artwork of a single individual. These installations are related to several similar concepts, most notably land art, where landscapes become the basis of a site-specific sculpture, and topiary gardens, which consists of clipping or training live plants into living sculptures. A sculpture trail layout may be adopted, either in a park or through open countryside. The Irwell Sculpture Trail, the largest public art scheme in England, includes 28 art pieces along a 30-mile (48 km) footpath stretching from Salford Quays through Bury into Rossendale and up to the Pennines above Bacup.

== History ==
Sculpture gardens have a long history: the oldest known collection of human constructions is the Neanderthal site inside Bruniquel Cave dated to approximately 175,000 years ago. Broken stalagmites were arranged by Neanderthals in a series of stacked or ring-like structures, and were found in 1990.

Garden statues, often of very high quality, were a feature of ancient Roman gardens, revived at the Renaissance, and then especially a feature of the Baroque garden. Palace gardens, such as the Gardens of Versailles, featured a concentration of sculpture equalling that of larger modern sculpture parks.

The oldest public sculpture garden in the US is in Brookgreen Gardens in South Carolina. The property was opened in 1932, and is on the National Register of Historic Places.

== See also ==
- List of garden types
- Garden of Cosmic Speculation
- Tarot Garden
- List of sculpture parks
