= Gluckstein =

Gluckstein is a surname. Notable people with the surname include:

- Daniel Gluckstein (born 1953), French politician
- Donny Gluckstein (born 1954), British historian
- Gluck (Hannah Gluckstein) (1895–1978), British painter
- Isidore Gluckstein, (1851–1920), British businessman and co-founder of J. Lyons and Co.
- Isidore Montague Gluckstein (1890–1975), British businessman, son of Montague
- Louis Gluckstein (1897–1979), British lawyer and politician
- Montague Gluckstein (1854–1922), British businessman and co-founder of J. Lyons and Co.
- Montague Isidore Gluckstein (1886–1958), British businessman, son of Isidore
- Samuel Gluckstein, (1880–1958), British lawyer and politician
- Samuel Gluckstein (1821–1873), Prussian-born British businessman, founder of Salmon & Gluckstein
- Steven Gluckstein (born 1990), American trampoline athlete
- Yigael Gluckstein, generally known as Tony Cliff, Palestinian Trotskyist theorist

== Other ==
- Salmon & Gluckstein, British tobacconist
