= Nigella Lawson =

English food writer and TV cook (born 1960)

The Honourable Nigella Lawson FRSL
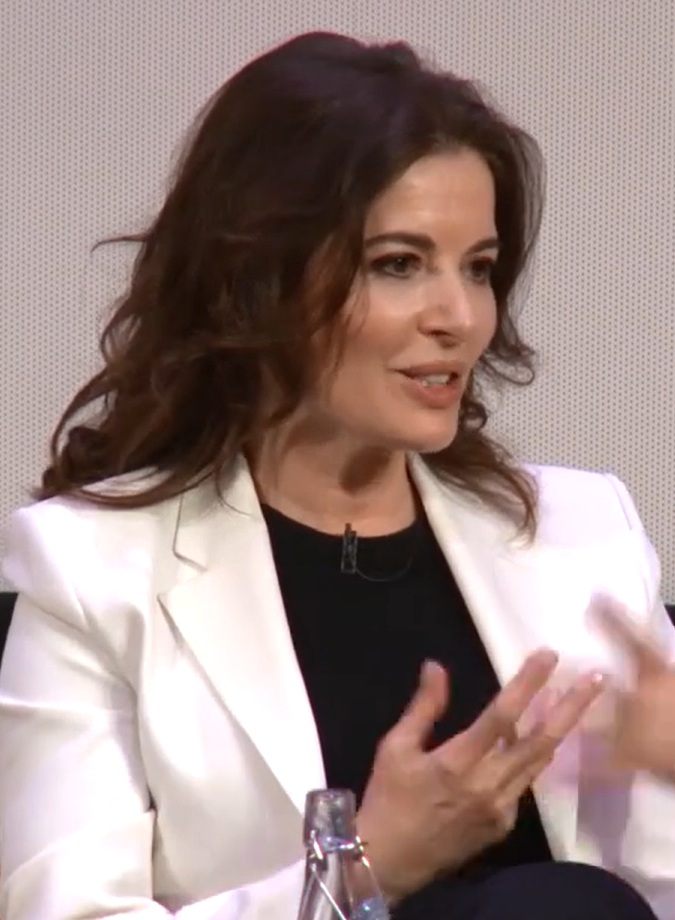
- Lawson in 2020
- Born: Nigella Lawson; 6 January 1960 (age 66); Wandsworth, London, England
- Education: University of Oxford
- Occupations: Food writer; television cook; journalist
- Years active: 1983–present
- Style: Desserts; pastry; Middle Eastern; English; Mediterranean
- Spouses: John Diamond (m. 1992; died 2001); Charles Saatchi (m. 2003; div. 2013)
- Children: 2
- Father: Nigel Lawson, Baron Lawson of Blaby
- Relatives: Dominic Lawson (brother)
- Nigella Lawson's voice From the BBC programme Woman's Hour, 12 December 2012
- Website: Official website

Nigella Lawson (born 6 January 1960) is an English food writer, television cook, and former journalist. Known for her relaxed and indulgent approach to cooking and food writing, she has sold more than 12 million cookery books worldwide to date, and has appeared on numerous television programmes in the United Kingdom and internationally.

After graduating from the University of Oxford, Lawson began her career in journalism, working as a book reviewer and restaurant critic before becoming deputy literary editor of The Sunday Times in 1986. She left the staff position the following year to pursue freelance writing. In 1998, her first cookery book, How to Eat, was published and sold over 300,000 copies, becoming a best-seller. Lawsons's second book, How to Be a Domestic Goddess, was published in 2000, winning the British Book Award for Author of the Year.

In the United Kingdom, Lawson hosted the cookery programmes Nigella Bites (1999–2001), Simply Nigella (2015), Nigella's Cook, Eat, Repeat (2020), and the ITV daytime chat show Nigella (2005). In the United States, she hosted the Food Network series Nigella Feasts (2006) and judged on the ABC cooking competition The Taste (2013–2014). She was a judge on the Australian cooking competition My Kitchen Rules (2022–2023). In 2026, Lawson became a judge on the Channel 4 baking competition The Great British Bake Off.

In 2021, Lawson was nominated for a BAFTA. In June 2026, she was elected a Fellow of the Royal Society of Literature in recognition of her contribution to food writing. Her range of cookware, Living Kitchen, has a value of £7 million.

== Early life ==
Nigella Lawson was born in 1960 in Wandsworth, London, one of the daughters of Nigel Lawson, Baron Lawson of Blaby (1932–2023), a business and finance journalist who later became a Conservative MP and Chancellor of the Exchequer in Margaret Thatcher's government, and his first wife, Vanessa Salmon (1936–1985), a socialite and the heiress to the J. Lyons and Co. fortune. Both her parents were from Jewish families. Her given name was originally suggested by her grandmother. Her family owned homes in Kensington and Chelsea.

Nigel and Vanessa Lawson divorced in 1980, when Nigella was 20. They both remarried: her father that year to a House of Commons researcher, Therese Maclear (to whom he was married until 2008), and her mother, in the early 1980s, to philosopher A. J. Ayer (they remained married until her mother's death). As her father was at the time a prominent political figure, Nigella found some of the judgements and preconceptions that were formed about her frustrating. She has attributed her unhappiness as a child, in part, to the problematic relationship she had with her mother.

Lawson's mother died of liver cancer in Westminster, London at the age of 48. Lawson's full-blood siblings are her brother, Dominic, former editor of The Sunday Telegraph, sister Horatia, and sister Thomasina, who died of breast cancer, in her early thirties, in 1993. She has a half-brother, Tom, who is currently headmaster at Eastbourne College, and a half-sister, Emily; Tom and Emily are her father's children by his second wife. Lawson is a cousin to both George Monbiot and Fiona Shackleton through the Salmon family.

=== Ancestry ===
Taking part in the third series of the BBC family-history documentary series Who Do You Think You Are?, Lawson sought to uncover some of her family's ancestry. She traced her ancestors to Ashkenazi Jews who were in diaspora in eastern Europe and Germany, leaving Lawson surprised not to have Sephardi ancestry, as she had believed. She also uncovered that her maternal great-great-great-grandfather, Coenraad Sammes (later Coleman Joseph), had fled to England from Amsterdam in 1830 to escape a prison sentence following a conviction for theft. His daughter Hannah married Samuel Gluckstein, who was in business with Barnett Salmon of Salmon & Gluckstein. They had several children, including Isidore and Montague Gluckstein, who together with Salmon founded J. Lyons and Co. in 1887, and Helena, who married him. One of the children of Helena and Barnett Salmon was Alfred Salmon (1868–1928), the great-grandfather of Nigella Lawson.

=== Education ===
Lawson spent some of her childhood in the Welsh village of Higher Kinnerton. She had to move schools nine times between the ages of 9 and 18; consequently, she described her school years as difficult. "I was just difficult, disruptive, good at school work, but rude, I suspect, and too highly-strung", Lawson reflected. She was educated at several independent schools, among them Ibstock Place School, Queen's Gate School and Godolphin and Latymer School. She worked for many department stores in London, and went on to graduate from Lady Margaret Hall at the University of Oxford with a second-class degree in medieval and modern languages. She lived in Florence, Italy, for a time.

== Career ==
=== Early work ===
Lawson originally worked in publishing, first taking a job under publisher Naim Attallah. At 23, she began her career in journalism after Charles Moore had invited her to write for The Spectator – her father had previously been editor at the same publication, and her older brother soon would take up the same role. Her initial work at the magazine consisted of writing book reviews, after which she became a restaurant critic there in 1985. She became the deputy literary editor of The Sunday Times in 1986, aged 26.

She attracted publicity in 1989 when she admitted voting for the Labour Party in the 1987 United Kingdom general election while her father was Chancellor of the Exchequer in the Conservative Party government of Margaret Thatcher, and then criticised Thatcher in print. Regarding her political relationship with her father, Lawson has stated, "My father would never expect me to agree with him about anything in particular and, to be honest, we never talk about politics much."

After The Sunday Times, she embarked upon a freelance writing career, realising that "I was on the wrong ladder. I didn't want to be an executive, being paid to worry rather than think". In the United Kingdom, she wrote for The Daily Telegraph, the Evening Standard, The Observer and The Times Literary Supplement, and penned a food column for Vogue and a make-up column for The Times Magazine, as well as working with Gourmet and Bon Appétit in the United States. In 1995 Lawson left a two-week stint at Talk Radio UK early after making a statement that her shopping was done for her, apparently due to its incompatibility with the radio station's desired "common touch". In the mid-1990s she occasionally hosted TV press-reviews slot What the Papers Say, and was co-host, with David Aaronovitch, of Channel 4 literary-discussion series Booked. In 1998 she repeatedly guested on Channel 4 cookery series Nigel Slater's Real-Food Show.

=== 1998–2002: First cookery books and Nigella Bites ===
Lawson had an established sense of cooking from her childhood, having had a mother who enjoyed cooking. She conceived the idea of writing a cookbook after she observed a dinner party host in tears because of an unset crème caramel. How to Eat (1998), featuring culinary tips on preparation and saving time, sold 300,000 copies in the UK. The Sunday Telegraph dubbed it "the most valuable culinary guide published this decade".

Its successor, How to be a Domestic Goddess (2000), focuses primarily on baking. The Times wrote of the book that it "is defined by its intimate, companionable approach. She is not issuing matronly instructions like Delia; she is merely making sisterly suggestions". Lawson rejected feminist criticism of her book, adding that "[s]ome people did take the domestic goddess title literally rather than ironically. It was about the pleasures of feeling like one rather than actually being one." The book sold 180,000 copies in four months, and won Lawson the title of Author of the Year at the British Book Awards in 2001, fending off competition from authors such as J. K. Rowling. How to Eat and How to be a Domestic Goddess were published in the U.S. in 2000 and 2001. As a result of the book's success, The Observer took her on as a social affairs columnist.

Lawson next hosted her own cooking show television series, Nigella Bites, which ran from 1999 to 2001 on Channel 4, followed by a Christmas special in 2001. Victor Lewis-Smith, a critic usually known for his biting comments, praised Lawson for being "formidably charismatic". The first series of Nigella Bites averaged 1.9 million viewers, and won her the Television Broadcast of the Year at the Guild of Food Writers Awards and the Best Television Food Show at the World Food Media Awards in 2001. The show yielded an accompanying best-selling recipe book, also called Nigella Bites, for which Waterstone's book stores reported UK sales of over 300,000. The book won the WH Smith Lifestyle Book of the Year award.

The Nigella Bites series, which was filmed in her home in west London, was later broadcast on American television channels E! and Style Network. Lawson said of the US release, "In the UK, my viewers have responded to the fact I'm trying to reduce, not add to, their burden and I'm looking forward to making that connection with Style viewers across the US". Overall, Lawson was well received in the United States. Those who did criticise her often suggested she was too flirtatious; a commentator from The New York Times said, "Lawson's sexy roundness mixed with her speed-demon technique makes cooking dinner with Nigella look like a prelude to an orgy". The book of Nigella Bites became the second best-selling cook book of Christmas 2002 in America. The series was followed by Forever Summer with Nigella in 2002 on Channel 4, the concept being, "that you cook to make you still feel as though you're on holiday". Fellow food writer Hugh Fearnley-Whittingstall condemned the concept as "cynical and reckless" and referred to the book as "Fuck Seasonality".

In 2002 Lawson also began to write a fortnightly cooking article for The New York Times, and brought out a profitable line of kitchenware, called the Living Kitchen range, which is sold by numerous retailers. Her range's value has continued to grow, starting at an estimated £2 million in 2003.

=== 2003–2006: Nigella Feasts and BBC contract ===
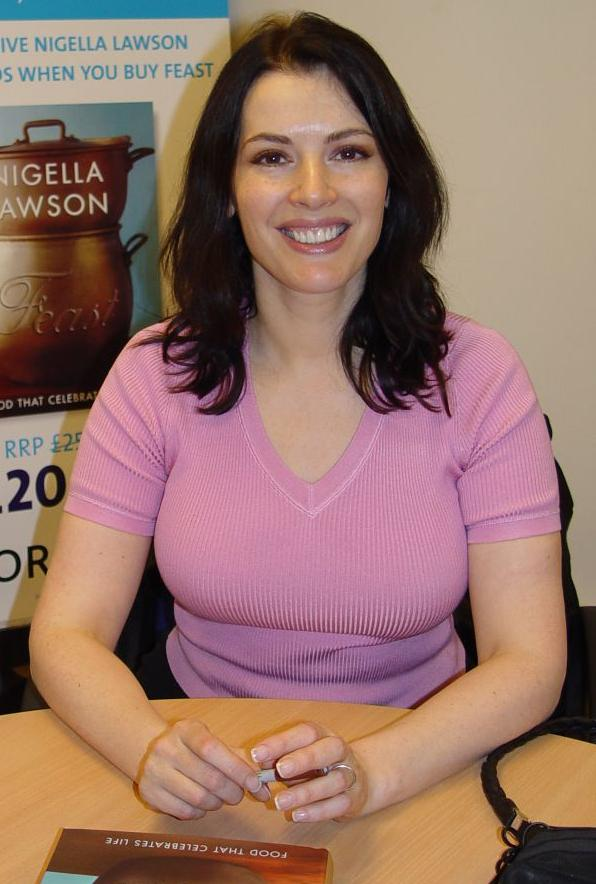
At a book signing in 2004

In November 2003, Lawson oversaw the menu and preparations for a lunch hosted by Tony Blair at Downing Street for George W. Bush and his wife during their state visit to the UK. Former First Lady of the United States, Laura Bush, is said to be a fan of Lawson's recipes and once included one of her soups as the starter for the 2002 presidential Christmas dinner. Lawson's fifth book, Feast: Food that Celebrates Life, released in 2004, made sales worth £3 million. London's Evening Standard wrote that the book "works both as a practical manual and an engrossing read. ... Nobody else writes so openly about the emotional significance of food." Lawson appeared frequently on American television in 2004, conducting cookery slots on talk shows such as The Ellen DeGeneres Show.

In the UK in 2005, Lawson started to host a daytime television chat show on ITV1 called Nigella, on which celebrity guests joined her in a studio kitchen. The first episode debuted with a disappointing 800,000 viewers. The show was met with a largely negative critical reaction, and after losing 40% of its viewers in the first week, the show was cancelled. She later commented to Radio Times that on her first show, she was almost too frightened to come out of her dressing room. Lawson added that having to pretend to be interested in the lives of the celebrities on her show became too much of an effort.

Her third food-based television series, called Nigella Feasts, debuted on the Food Network in the United States in Autumn 2006 for a 13-week run. Time magazine wrote a favourable review of the show; "the real appeal of Feasts ... is her unfussy, wry, practical approach to entertaining and quality comfort food. Feasts will leave you wishing for an invite".

Lawson was next signed to BBC Two to host a three-part cookery show entitled Nigella's Christmas Kitchen, which began on 6 December 2006 and aired weekly. The first two episodes secured the second highest ratings of the week for BBC Two, with the first episode debuting with a strong 3.5 million. The final episode went on to become the top show on BBC Two the week that it was aired. Nigella's Christmas Kitchen won Lawson a second World Food Media Award in 2007. Her influence as a food commentator was also demonstrated in late 2006, when after she had lauded goose fat as being an essential ingredient for Christmas, sales of the product increased significantly in the UK. Waitrose and Tesco both stated that goose fat sales had more than doubled, as well as Asda's increasing by 65% from the previous week. Similarly, after she advised using prunes in a recipe on Nigella's Christmas Kitchen, Waitrose had increased sales of 30% year on year.

=== 2007–2009: Nigella Express and Nigella's Christmas ===
Nigella's Christmas Kitchen led to the commissioning of a 13-part cookery series about fast food entitled Nigella Express. She said, "The recipes aren't particularly healthy. That said, I wouldn't describe them as junk." The show became another ratings success and one of BBC Two's top-rated shows each week. The first episode debuted with 2.85 million viewers, a high percentage above the channel's slot average. The second episode's viewing figures rose to 3.3 million, and the series peaked at 3.4 million on 22 October 2007.

Her influence with the public was again demonstrated when sales of Riesling wine increased by 30% in the UK after she had incorporated it into her Coq au Riesling recipe on Nigella Express. In December 2007 she appeared on BBC's The Graham Norton Show and said that she had once eaten 30 pickled eggs for a £1,000 bet.

Lawson was criticised by some viewers who complained that she had gained weight since the debut episode of the series. The Guardian, however, noted, "the food matches her appearance – flawless, polished and sexy". The rights to Nigella Express were sold to Discovery Asia. The series was nominated at the 35th Daytime Emmy Awards in the United States for Outstanding Lifestyle Program, and Lawson herself for the Outstanding Lifestyle Host.

The accompanying book to Nigella Express was released in the UK in September 2007, US in November 2007, and in Australia in 2008. Sharing the same name as the television series, the book became another best-seller in the UK, and was outselling television chef Jamie Oliver by 100,000 copies, according to Waterstone's. It was reported that over 490,000 copies had been sold by mid-December in the UK. Furthermore, the book was number one for a period on Amazon UK's best-selling books, and was ninth on their overall list of Christmas best-sellers in any category. Paul Levy of The Guardian wrote that the tone of the recipes was "just right. One of the appealing things about Nigella's brief introductions to each of them is that she thinks not just as cook, but as eater, and tells you whether they're messy, sticky or fussy." In January 2008, Lawson was estimated to have sold more than 3 million books worldwide. Her Christmas book was released in October 2008 and the television show in December of the same year.

=== 2010–2014: Nigellissima and The Taste ===
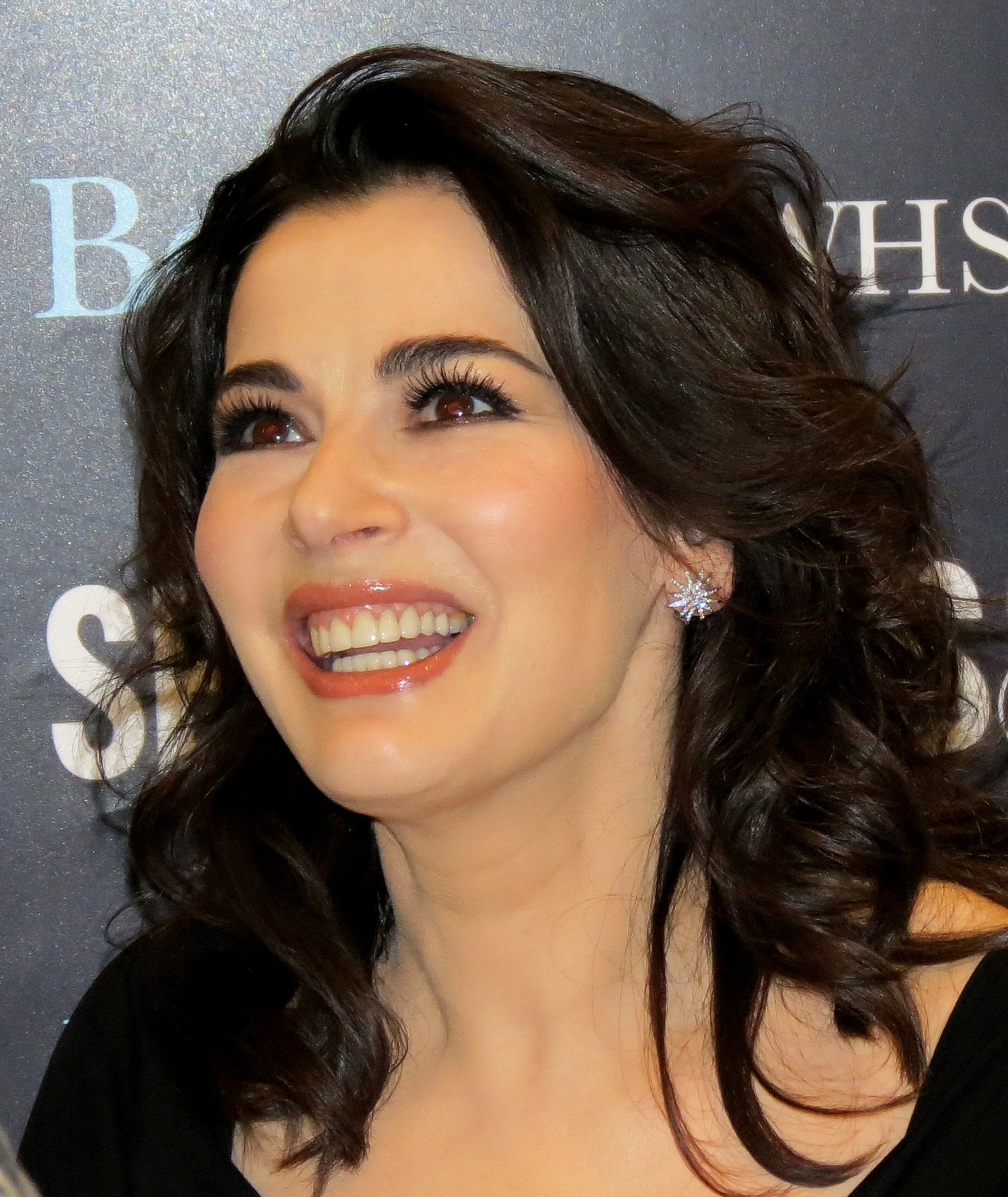
Lawson at Selfridges London, December 2012

Lawson was featured as one of the three judges on a special battle of Iron Chef America, titled "The Super Chef Battle", which pitted White House Executive Chef Cristeta Comerford and Iron Chef Bobby Flay against chef Emeril Lagasse and Iron Chef Mario Batali. This episode was originally broadcast on 3 January 2010. Lawson's cookbook Kitchen: Recipes from the Heart of the Home (2010) is a tie-in with the TV series "Nigella Kitchen". This was shown in the UK and on the Food Network in the United States.

Nigellissima: Instant Italian Inspiration was released in 2012. The 8-part TV series entitled Nigellissima was broadcast by the BBC. Lawson obtained work experience in Italy during her gap year.

She travelled to the United States in 2013 and starred alongside Anthony Bourdain in the reality cooking show The Taste. The UK version of the show began airing on 7 January 2014 on Channel 4. Lawson was granted a visa to travel to the United States and travelled there for a continuation of the series. In May 2014, Lawson travelled to New Zealand to film an advertisement for New Zealand chocolate and confectionery manufacturer Whittaker's.

=== 2015–2025: Simply Nigella, Eurovision and Australian Television ===
The UK and US series of The Taste were both completed and in autumn 2015 Lawson began Simply Nigella for BBC 2. The focus was on comfort food, familiar dishes that are simple and quick to cook.

Lawson was spokesperson for the United Kingdom in the Eurovision Song Contest 2015, giving the twelve points to Sweden's Måns Zelmerlöw and his song "Heroes", which went on to win the contest.

It was reported on 18 January 2016, that Lawson would make a return to Australian television, joining the eighth series of MasterChef Australia as a guest judge, alongside the returning judges. She returned to the show for the tenth series in 2018 and eleventh series in 2019.

In 2022, it was announced that Lawson would be returning to Australian television as a judge on the twelfth season of 7 Network's My Kitchen Rules. Lawson co-hosted and judged the first six episodes of the season alongside long term judge Manu Feildel before leaving the series after the first round of instant restaurants.

In 2023, it was announced that Lawson would be returning to the show for its thirteenth season as a judge in Kitchen HQ alongside fellow returning judges Manu Feildel and Colin Fassnidge.

=== 2026–present: The Great British Bake Off ===
In January 2026, Lawson was announced to be replacing Prue Leith as a judge on The Great British Bake Off, beginning with its seventeenth series.

== Public image ==
Though Lawson has enjoyed a successful career in cookery, she is not a trained chef, and does not like being referred to as a "celebrity chef". Nor does she see herself as a cook or an expert in her field; nonetheless, she is frequently described as a chef. Throughout Lawson's television programmes, she emphasises that she cooks for her own pleasure, for enjoyment, and that she finds cooking therapeutic. When deciding upon which recipes to feature in her books, she takes the view of the eater, stating, "If it's something I don't want to carry on eating once I'm full, then I don't want the recipe ... I have to feel that I want to cook the thing again."

Lawson has adopted a casual approach to cooking, stating, "I think cooking should be about fun and family. ... I think part of my appeal is that my approach to cooking is really relaxed and not rigid. There are no rules in my kitchen." One editor, highlighting the technical simplicity of Lawson's recipes, noted that "her dishes require none of the elaborate preparation called for by most TV chefs".

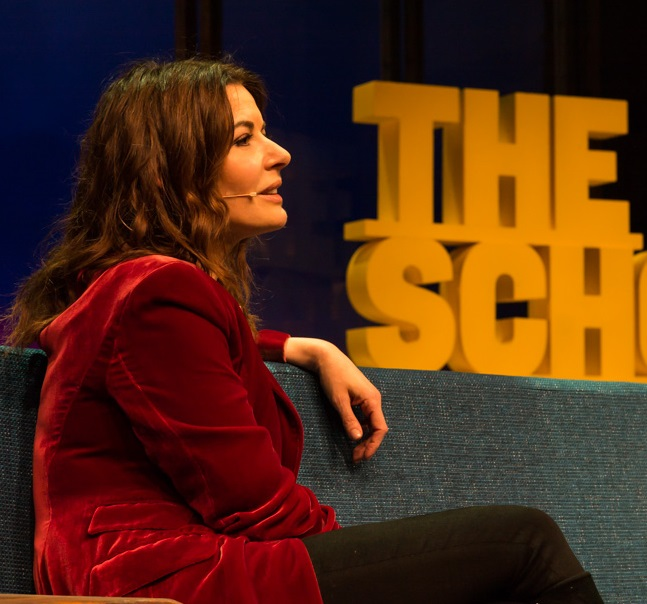
Lawson in 2017

Lawson has become renowned for her flirtatious manner of presenting, although she argues "It's not meant to be flirtatious. ... I don't have the talent to adopt a different persona. It's intimate, not flirtatious". The perceived overt sexuality of her presentation style has led to Lawson being called the "queen of food porn". Many commentators have alluded to Lawson's attractiveness, and she was once named as one of the world's most beautiful women.

The media have also noted Lawson's ability to engage with both male and female viewers; The Guardian wrote, "Men love her because they want to be with her. Women love her because they want to be her." Chef Gary Rhodes said that viewers were attracted to her smile rather than her cooking. Despite often being labelled as a "domestic goddess", she said that she exhibits very few of the qualities associated with the title.

== Personal life ==
=== First marriage and children ===
Lawson met journalist John Diamond in 1986, when they were both writing for The Sunday Times. They married in Venice in 1992, and had a daughter, Cosima, and a son, Bruno. Diamond was diagnosed with throat cancer in 1997 and died in March 2001, aged 47. One of his last messages to Lawson was, "How proud I am of you and what you have become. The great thing about us is that we have made us who we are." His death occurred during the filming of Nigella Bites; "I took a fortnight off. But I'm not a great believer in breaks", Lawson said; she suffered a bout of depression following the funeral. After Diamond's death, Lawson kept all of the related press clippings in what she called her "Morbidobox".

=== Second marriage ===
Lawson married art collector Charles Saatchi in September 2003.

In June 2013, photographs were published by The Sunday People of Lawson being grabbed around the neck by Saatchi, during an argument outside a London seafood restaurant. According to a witness, Lawson was very distressed by the incident. Saatchi later described the pictures as showing only a "playful tiff" and his trying to emphasise a point. After a police investigation of the incident, Saatchi was cautioned for assault, and Lawson left the family home. Lawson said in court Saatchi subjected her to "intimate terrorism", that he threatened to destroy her unless she cleared him in court. Subsequently, while giving evidence, Lawson claimed casual cruelty and controlling behaviour by Saatchi made her unhappy and drove her to occasional drug use. She cited an example that Saatchi prevented her entertaining at home and punished her for going to a birthday party of a woman friend. She was not beaten but was left emotionally scarred.

Saatchi announced his divorce from Lawson in early July, stating that he had "clearly been a disappointment to Nigella during the last year or so" and the couple had "become estranged and drifted apart". Lawson made no public comment in response; however, court papers showed that it was Lawson who applied for divorce, citing ongoing unreasonable behaviour. On 31 July 2013, seven weeks after the incident, the pair were granted a decree nisi, ending their ten-year marriage. They reached a private financial settlement.

=== Assistants' fraud trial ===
On November 2013, a trial of the former couple's two personal assistants, sisters began in R v Grillo and Grillo. The Grillos were accused of allegedly misusing the credit cards of Saatchi's private company. During court proceedings in early December, the sisters claimed that Lawson had permitted their use of the credit cards in exchange for their silence regarding her drug use. Questions regarding Lawson's drug use were allowed by the judge as part of the sisters' "bad character" defence. Lawson admitted to taking cocaine and cannabis but denied she had been addicted, stating, "I found it made an intolerable situation tolerable." On 20 December 2013, the two sisters were acquitted. Scotland Yard said that Lawson would not be investigated over the drug allegations.

Charles Saatchi was alleged to have started a smear campaign against Lawson in the British media through PR man Richard Hillgrove before the trial was over. Lawson's lawyers demanded that Hillgrove remove comments about her from his blog. Lawson said in court that ending her marriage to Saatchi had created intolerable conditions for herself and her family, describing Saatchi as "a brilliant but brutal man".

Lawson maintained she was "totally cannabis, cocaine, any drug, free" after the divorce.

On 30 March 2014, Lawson was not permitted to board a flight from London to Los Angeles. The US Department of Homeland Security explained that foreigners who had admitted drug taking were deemed "inadmissible". However, US authorities invited her to apply for a visa shortly afterwards, and she was granted a "waiver of inadmissibility" allowing her to travel to the US.

=== Interests and beliefs ===
In 2008, Lawson reported that she held a personal fortune of £15 million. Her then husband Charles Saatchi was worth £100 million at that time. She said her two children should not inherit any of her money, saying: "I am determined that my children should have no financial security. It ruins people not having to earn money."

Lawson is Jewish. Both of Lawson's parents were Jewish and her upbringing was non-observant. Lawson is an atheist.

In one of her newspaper articles, she said "most [women] simply have, somewhere, a fantasy about having sex, in a non-defining, non-exclusive way, with other women."

Lawson is a supporter of the Lavender Trust which gives support to young women with breast cancer. She first became involved with the charity in 2002 when she baked some lavender cupcakes to be auctioned at a fundraising event, which sold for a significant amount of money. She subsequently featured the recipe in her book Forever Summer with Nigella.

In December 2008, Lawson was criticised by animal rights groups for comments which suggested it would be morally acceptable to wear the fur of an animal that one had killed, and that she would be proud to wear the fur of a bear that she had hunted or "[gone] into battle" with.

It was revealed by leaked Whitehall documents in 2003 that Lawson declined an OBE from Queen Elizabeth II in 2001, explaining that "I'm not saving lives and I'm not doing anything other than something I absolutely love." As the daughter of a life peer, Lawson is entitled to the courtesy style of "The Honourable", and may thus be referred to as The Hon. Nigella Lawson; however, she does not use this courtesy style.

Lawson has stated that she believes cooking is "a metaphor for life", in the sense that "When you cook, you need structure [...] but just as importantly you need to be able to loosen up and go with the flow [...] you must not strive for perfection but, rather, acknowledge your mistakes and work out how you can rectify them". She has described cooking as "a way of strengthening oneself", in the sense that "being able to sustain oneself is the skill of the survivor".

== Television credits ==
Year	Title	Role	Episodes
1999–2001	Nigella Bites	Host	16 episodes (series 1–2; one Christmas special)
2002	Forever Summer	Host	8 episodes
2005	Nigella	Host	20 episodes
2006	Nigella Feasts	Host	13 episodes
2006, 2008	Nigella's Christmas Kitchen	Host	6 episodes (series 1–2)
2007	Nigella Express	Host	13 episodes
2009	Top Chef	Guest Judge	Episode: "Strip Around the World" (season 6)
2010	Super Chef Battle: An Iron Chef America Event	Guest Judge	Television special
2010	Nigella Kitchen	Host	13 episodes
2011, 2016, 2018–2021	MasterChef Australia	Guest Judge	16 episodes
2012	Nigellissima	Host	7 episodes
2013–2014	The Taste	Judge	23 episodes (series 1–3)
2014	The Taste (UK)	Judge	10 episodes (series 1)
2014	Modern Family	Herself (voice on a cooking app)	Episode: "Three Turkeys"
2015	Eurovision Song Contest 2015	Spokesperson	Final
2015	Simply Nigella	Host	6 episodes and one Christmas special
2017	Nigella: At My Table	Host	6 episodes and one Christmas special
2019	MasterChef US	Guest Judge	Episode: "London Calling – Pt. 2" (season 10)
2020	Nigella's Cook, Eat, Repeat	Host	6 episodes and one Christmas special
2022–2023	My Kitchen Rules	Judge	Season 12, Season 13
2023	Nigella's Amsterdam Christmas	Presenter	Christmas special
2026	The Great American Baking Show	Guest Judge	1 episode
2026–present	The Great British Bake Off	Judge	Series 17–present

== Awards and nominations ==
- 2000 – British Book Awards – Author of the Year for How to Be a Domestic Goddess
- 2001 – WHSmith Book Award – How to Be a Domestic Goddess shortlisted for Lifestyle Book of the Year
- 2001 – Guild of Food Writers – Television Broadcast of the Year for Nigella Bites
- 2001 – World Food Media Award – Gold Ladle Best Television Food Show for Nigella Bites
- 2002 – WHSmith Book Awards – Lifestyle Book of the Year for Nigella Bites
- 2007 – World Food Media Award – Gold Ladle Best Food and/or Drink Television Show for Nigella's Christmas Kitchen
- 2016 – Fortnum & Mason TV Personality of the Year
- 2021 – nominated for a BAFTA for her pronunciation of microwave (mee-cro-wah-vay) during an episode of her series Nigella's Cook, Eat, Repeat.
- 2026 – elected a Fellow of the Royal Society of Literature

== Bibliography ==
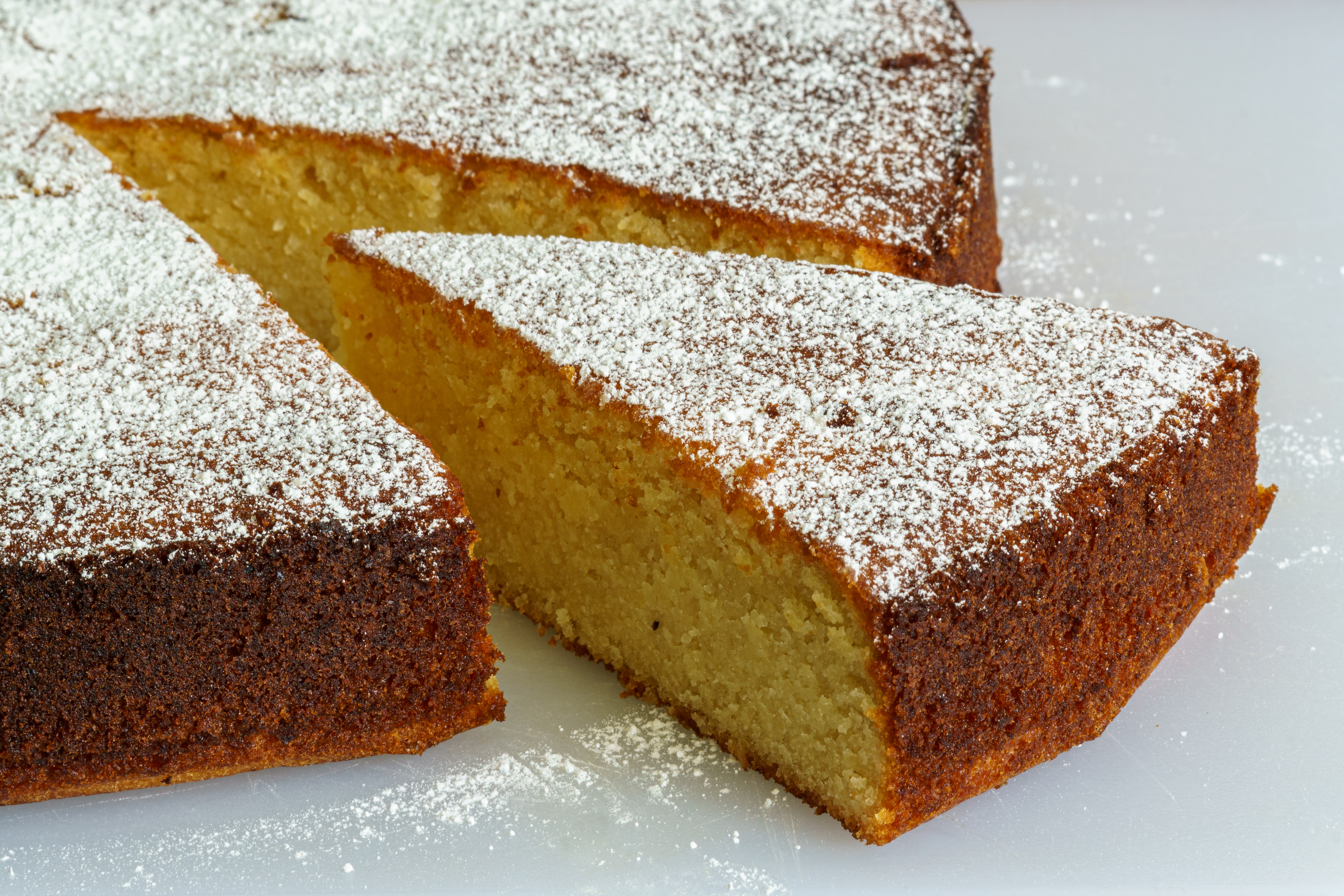
Damp lemon and almond cake, from "How to Be a Domestic Goddess"

- How to Eat: Pleasures and Principles of Good Food, Chatto and Windus, John Wiley & Sons, (ISBN 0-471-25750-8, 1998)
- How to Be a Domestic Goddess: Baking and the Art of Comfort Cooking, Chatto and Windus, (ISBN 0-7011-6888-9, 2000)
- Nigella Bites, Chatto and Windus, (ISBN 0-7011-7287-8, 2001)
- Forever Summer with Nigella, Chatto and Windus, (ISBN 0-7011-7381-5, 2002)
- Feast: Food that Celebrates Life, Chatto and Windus, (ISBN 0-7011-7521-4, 2004) or Hyperion, (ISBN 1-4013-0136-3, 2004)
- Nigella Lawson, A Biography, Gilly Smith, (ISBN 1-56980-299-8, 2006)
- Nigella Express, Chatto and Windus, (ISBN 0-7011-8184-2, 2007)
- Nigella Christmas, Chatto and Windus, (ISBN 0-7011-8322-5, 2008)
- Nigella Kitchen: Recipes from the Heart of the Home, Chatto and Windus, (ISBN 0-7011-8460-4, 2010)
- Nigellissima: Instant Italian Inspiration, Chatto and Windus, (ISBN 0-7011-8733-6, 2012)
- How To Be A Domestic Goddess, Chatto and Windus, (ISBN 978-0701189143, 2014)
- Simply Nigella, Chatto and Windus, (ISBN 978-0-7011-8935-8, 2015)
- At My Table: A Celebration of Home Cooking, Chatto and Windus, (ISBN 978-1784741631, 2017)
- Nigella's Cook, Eat, Repeat, Chatto and Windus, (ISBN 978-1784743666, 2020)

== See also ==
- List of people who have declined a British honour
