= Barnett Salmon =

British tobacco manufacturer (1829–1897)

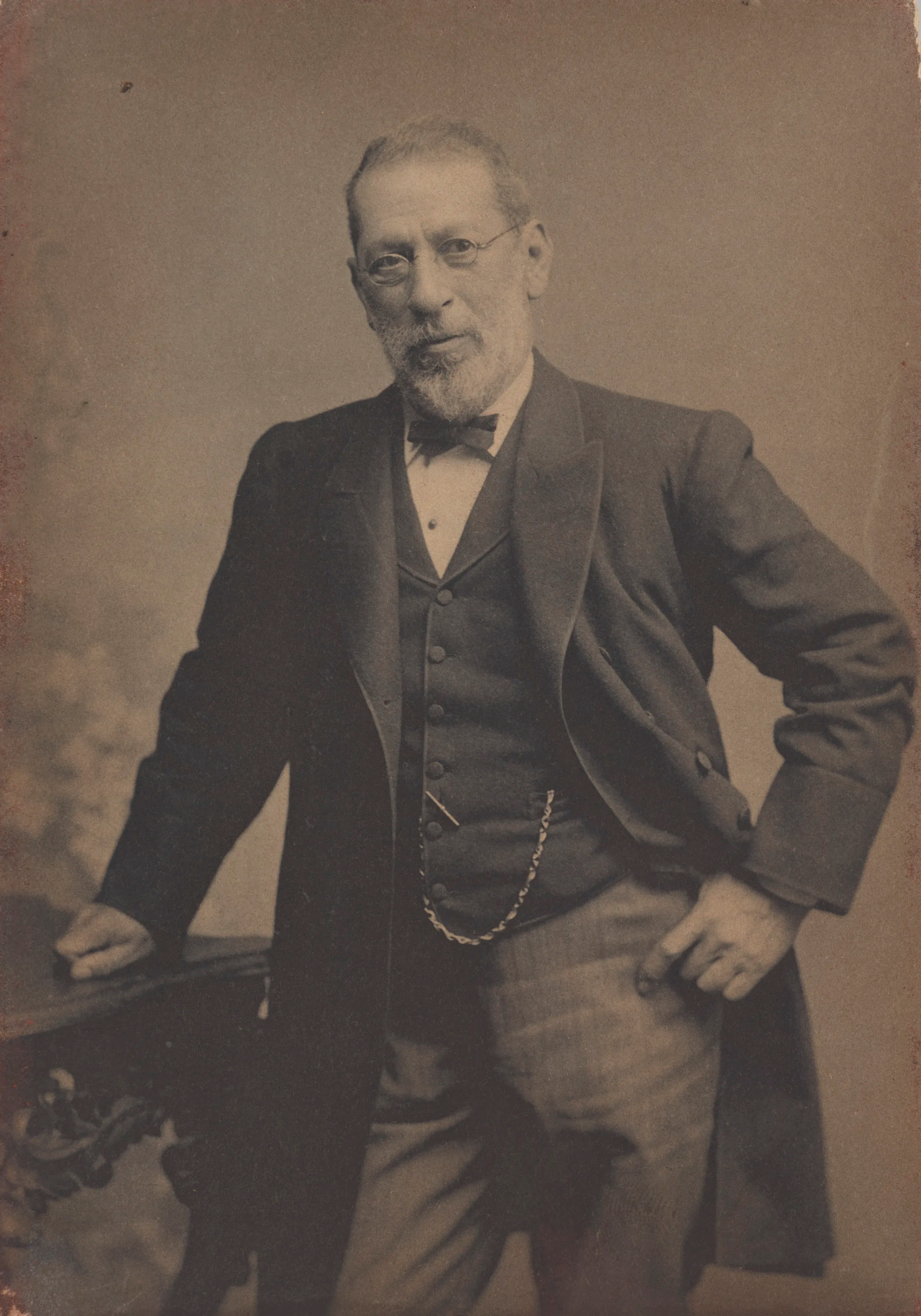
- Salmon in c. 1880
- Born: 1829; London, United Kingdom
- Died: 11 February 1897 (aged 67–68)
- Occupations: Tobacco manufacturer, businessman
- Known for: co-founder of Salmon & Gluckstein
- Spouse: Helena Gluckstein (m. 1863)
- Children: 15 (including Isidore Salmon, Alfred Salmon, and Harry Salmon)
- Relatives: Samuel Gluckstein (father in-law)

Barnett Salmon (1829 – 11 February 1897) was a British tobacco manufacturer and businessman who was co-founder of Salmon & Gluckstein, which by 1901 was the world's largest retail tobacconist, owning 140 retail outlets.

== Early life ==
He was the son of Aaron Solomons, a clothes dealer in London's East End, and his wife Jane Barnett Simmons.

== Career ==
Salmon began his career as a travelling tobacco salesman. After his marriage in 1863, he went into business with his father-in-law, founding Salmon & Gluckstein.

== Personal life ==
He married Helena Gluckstein in 1863, the daughter of Samuel Gluckstein. They had nine sons and six daughters, but six died in infancy, one from diarrhoea, four from scarlet fever and one from failure to thrive.

Their children included:

- Sir Isidore Salmon (1876–1941), businessman and Conservative Party politician
- Alfred Salmon (1868–1928), father of Felix Addison Salmon, and great-grandfather of Nigella Lawson
- Montagu Salmon (1878–1943), father of Cyril Salmon, Baron Salmon, judge
- Harry Salmon JP (1881–1950), chairman from 1941 to 1950 of J. Lyons and Co.
- Julius Salmon (1888–1940), married Emma Gluckstein, father of Brian Lawson Salmon
