= Isidore Salmon =

British businessman and politician (1876–1941)

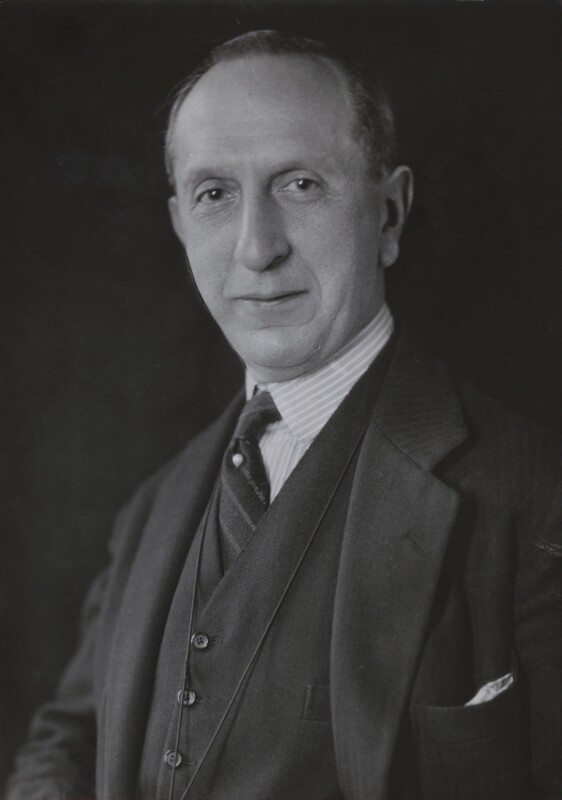
Isidore Salmon

Sir Isidore Salmon CBE DL JP (10 February 1876 – 16 September 1941) was a British businessman and Conservative Party politician.

== Early life ==
He was the son of Barnett Salmon and his wife, Helena Gluckstein, the daughter of Samuel Gluckstein. They were the co-founders of Salmon & Gluckstein tobacconists. The company later expanded into the catering business under the name of a third partner, Joseph Lyons.

== Career ==
Isidore Salmon served his apprenticeship in the kitchens of the Hotel Bristol, London. He subsequently worked for Lyons and was in charge of catering at the Olympia Exhibition Centre and the Crystal Palace.

In 1907, he was elected to the London County Council as a Municipal Reform Party councillor. Initially he represented Islington West, then Hammersmith from 1910. He remained a member of the council until 1925, and was vice-chairman in 1924–25.

As a member of the LCC, he promoted the teaching of catering skills, and was chairman of the Westminster Technical School for training chefs and waiters for thirty-one years. He was also the council's representative on the governing body of the National Training College of Domestic Subjects. He was appointed a Commander of the Order of the British Empire in 1920.

At the 1924 general election, Salmon was elected to the House of Commons as Member of Parliament (MP) for the Harrow division of Middlesex, after the sitting Conservative MP Oswald Mosley had joined the Labour Party and decided not to stand again. Salmon held the seat until his death, was a member of the Public Accounts Committee and served on a number of royal commissions and committees. In 1933, he was knighted for "political and public services".

Outside politics he was involved in the management of J. Lyons and Co., becoming a director in 1904, managing director in 1910 and chairman in 1929. For the company, Salmon planned the new Cumberland Hotel, and on 11 December 1933 gave King George V and Queen Mary a private tour of it. Later that day he presided over a grand luncheon to celebrate the hotel's opening.

From March 1938 until his death, Salmon held the office of honorary catering adviser to the British Army. He was instrumental in bringing about the formation of a specialised Army Catering Corps to improve the standard of food in the army.

He spent seven years as vice-president of the Board of Deputies of British Jews and was actively involved in a number of Jewish charities in London.

He was instrumental in persuading Viscount Rothermere to withdraw the Daily Mail's support for Oswald Mosley and the British Union of Fascists in 1934, by threatening to remove advertising for Lyons from the paper.

== Personal life ==
He married Kate Abrahams in 1899, and they had two sons, Samuel Isidore Salmon and Julian Salmon.

Parliament of the United Kingdom
Preceded by Oswald Mosley	Member of Parliament for Harrow; 1924–1941	Succeeded by Norman Bower
