= Peter Bird =

Peter Bird may refer to:

- Peter Bird (IT manager) (1934–2017), British computer operator
- Peter Bird (footballer) (born 1976), Australian rules footballer
- Peter Bird (rower) (1947–1996), British ocean rower
