= Alfred Salmon =

British business executive

Alfred Salmon (20 July 1868 – 11 October 1928), was the chairman of J. Lyons and Co. from 1923 to 1928.

== Early life ==
He was the eldest son of Barnett Salmon and Helena Gluckstein, the daughter of Samuel Gluckstein.

== Career ==
Salmon was the chairman of J. Lyons and Co. from 1923 to 1928.

== Personal life ==
Salmon married Frances Abrahams in 1894, and they had three children:

- Barnett Alfred Salmon (1895–1965), grandfather of Fiona Shackleton (née Charkham)
- Felix Addison Salmon (1908–1969), father-in-law of Nigel Lawson and grandfather of Nigella Lawson and Dominic Lawson
- Ivor Francis Salmon (1911–2004)
