= Harry Salmon (businessman) =

British businessman (1881–1950)

Henry Salmon JP (1881–1950), was a British businessman, the chairman from 1941 to 1950 of J. Lyons and Co.

== Early life ==
Harry Salmon was a younger son of Barnett Salmon (1829–1897) who co-founded Salmon & Gluckstein and J. Lyons and Co.

== Career ==
Salmon was a director of J. Lyons and Co. by 1935, and chairman from 1941 to 1950, when he was succeeded by Major Montague Isidore Gluckstein OBE.

== Personal life ==
Salmon married Lena Gluckstein, the daughter of Isidore Gluckstein and his wife Rose Cohen. Their children included Geoffrey Salmon and Ruth Margaret Salmon Monbiot, the grandmother of George Monbiot.
