= Geoffrey Salmon =

British businessman and catering advisor to the British Amy

Geoffrey Isidore Hamilton Salmon CBE (14 January 1908 – 29 April 1990), was the chairman of J. Lyons and Co. from 1968 to 1972, and catering advisor to the British Army.

== Early life ==
Salmon was born on 14 January 1908, and educated at Malvern College and Jesus College, Cambridge. He was the son of Harry Salmon and his wife Lena Gluckstein, the daughter of Isidore Gluckstein.

== Career ==
Salmon was the chairman of J. Lyons and Co. from 1968 to 1972, and catering advisor to the British Army.

== Personal life ==
He married Peggy Jacobs (1915–1989), and they had two sons and a daughter.
