= IEBC =

IEBC may refer to:

- Independent Electoral and Boundaries Commission, a Kenyan regulatory agency
- I.E.B.C. (writer), Irwin Cox (1838–1922), British barrister, magazine proprietor, and politician
