= Cyril Salmon, Baron Salmon =

British judge (1903–1991)

The Right Honourable The Lord Salmon PC
- Salmon in 1946

Lord of Appeal in Ordinary

Personal details
- Born: 28 December 1903
- Died: 7 November 1991 (aged 87)
- Education: Mill Hill School
- Alma mater: Pembroke College, Cambridge
- Military career
- Allegiance: United Kingdom
- Branch: British Army
- Service years: 1940-45
- Rank: Major
- Units: Royal Artillery
- Conflicts: World War II

Cyril Barnet Salmon, Baron Salmon, PC (28 December 1903 – 7 November 1991) was a British judge.

== Early life and career ==
Salmon was the son of Montagu Salmon (1878–1943), tobacco merchant, and Marian Nina Trevor, née Abrahams, his wife. He was the grandson of Barnett Salmon (1829–1897) co-founder of Salmon & Gluckstein, tobacco merchants. He was educated at Mill Hill School and Pembroke College, Cambridge, where he read Law.

He was called to the bar by the Middle Temple in 1925, and was the pupil of Walter Monckton, before joining the chambers of Lord Wright at 5 Crown Office. During World War II, Salmon was commissioned into the Royal Artillery in 1940, and was attached to the Eighth Army as a judge advocate. He ended the war with the rank of major.

Salmon took silk in April 1945. His chambers had been destroyed by bombing during the war, and little of his pre-war practice remained. Nevertheless, Salmon successfully rebuilt his practice. He served as Recorder of Gravesend between 1947 and 1957, and was appointed a Commissioner of Assize for the Wales and Chester Circuit in 1955.

== Judicial career ==
Salmon was appointed to the High Court in 1957 and assigned to the Queen's Bench Division, and received the customary knighthood. In 1964, he was made a Lord Justice of Appeal and sworn of the Privy Council. On 10 January 1972, he was appointed a Lord of Appeal in Ordinary, being created, at the same time, a life peer with the title Baron Salmon, of Sandwich in the County of Kent. He presided over the trials of the leaders of the 1958 Notting Hill race riots, sentencing the white youths who led the riots to 5 years in jail. This exemplary sentencing had the effect of preventing further trouble in the area.

== Personal life ==
On 25 July 1929, Salmon married Rencie Vanderfelt (d. 1942), the daughter of Sydney Gorton Vanderfelt, and they had two children, Gai Rencie Salmon (b. 1933) and David Neville Cyril Salmon (b. 1935).

Following his first wife's death in 1942, Salmon remarried in 1946 to Jean Beatrice Morris, Lady Morris (1912–1989), the elder daughter of Lieutenant-Colonel David Edward Maitland-Makgill-Crichton, and the divorced wife of Michael William Morris, 2nd Baron Morris.

== Arms ==
Coat of arms of Cyril Salmon, Baron Salmon

Escutcheon
Per chevron Gules and Ermine in chief two horses forcene Argent in base a sword erect Gules pommel and hilt Or a chief Or.
