= How to Eat =

Book by Nigella Lawson

- First edition
- Author: Nigella Lawson
- Subject: Cookery
- Publisher: Chatto and Windus
- Publication date: 1998
- Publication place: England
- Pages: 514

How to Eat is a 1998 book of English cuisine by the celebrity cook Nigella Lawson. It features culinary tips on preparation and saving time, and sold 300,000 copies in Britain. It was praised by critics as a valuable guide to cooking.

== Contents ==
The book is divided into themed chapters, such as cooking for "One or Two". Most of each chapter consists of recipes, but the chapters begin with a few pages of general advice on the theme, such as that while cooking for one may feel "onanistic", "it might be a good thing to consider yourself worth cooking for."

The ingredients and quantities are tabulated in red boldface type. The recipe itself is given as a paragraph of instructions in light type.

The techniques used are not rigidly traditional: in her recipe for Ratatouille, introduced to Britain by Elizabeth David, Lawson admits that she is departing from David's prescriptions, but states that this does not seem to make much difference as she does not get a "soggy mush" by skipping the hour spent salting the aubergine and courgettes, but she explains the David method in an aside, just in case anyone want to try it.

== Reception ==
In her chapter Consuming Nigella in Feminism, Domesticity and Popular Culture, Lise Shapiro Sanders observes that Lawson's early books including How to Eat and How to Be a Domestic Goddess (2001) "emphasize cooking and eating as sites of pleasure for women." Sanders explains that the pleasure is both "authentic" and "ironic, self-consciously reworking a mid-twentieth-century ideology of domestic femininity." In particular, baking gives Lawson "access to a fantasy of femininity that, instead of dooming women to lives of 'domestic drudgery', enables the performance of a 'weekend alter ego winning adoring glances and endless approbation from anyone who has the good fortune to eat in her kitchen'". Sanders notes Lawson's disclaimer in her preface that "I have nothing to declare but my greed (page xv)". She interprets Lawson as meaning to remind readers of "the joys of giving in to temptation". She notes from a passage by Simon Hoggart in The Spectator (about Nigella Bites) that Lawson "becomes an object of desire, ready-made for the consumption of the heterosexual male audience", complete with double entendres and sexually suggestive language, both of which Sanders calls trademarks of Lawson's style.

The Sunday Telegraph called the book "the most valuable culinary guide published this decade."

Tony Buchsbaum, writing in the January Magazine, calls How to Eat "almost biblical, with countless recipes for just about anything one could name. It was all black ink on white pages, hardly the luxuriously art-directed volumes that would follow: How To Be a Domestic Goddess, Nigella Bites, Forever Summer..."
