= 1941 Harrow by-election =

UK Parliamentary by-election

The 1941 Harrow by-election was held on 2 December 1941. The by-election was held due to the death of the incumbent Conservative MP, Isidore Salmon. It was won by the Conservative candidate Norman Bower. By the time of the by-election, Harrow's electorate had more than quadrupled since 1924, and stood at 168,594 voters in 1941.

1941 Harrow by-election
Party	Candidate	Votes	%	±%
Conservative	Norman Bower	14,540	80.9	+18.2
Independent Democrat	Winifred Clarice Henney	3,433	19.1	New
Majority		11,107	61.8	+36.4
Turnout		17,973	10.7	−53.7
Conservative hold		Swing		
