= Montague Gluckstein =

British businessman (1854–1922)

Montague Gluckstein, known to his family as Monte, (18 July 1854 – 7 October 1922) was a director of Salmon & Gluckstein tobacco merchants, and one of the founders of J. Lyons and Co., a restaurant chain, food manufacturing, and hotel conglomerate created in 1884 that dominated British mass-catering in the first half of the twentieth century. Descendant and historian of Lyons, Thomas Harding, has described him as "the primary entrepreneurial engine behind this original family vision".

== Early life ==
Montague Gluckstein was the son of Samuel Gluckstein, the founder of Salmon & Gluckstein.

== Career ==
He succeeded his brother Isidore Gluckstein as chairman of J. Lyons and Co.

== Personal life ==
He married Matilda (Tilly) Franks (b. 1861) in 1884. They had three children. Their son Samuel Montague Gluckstein (SMG) (1884–1928) was a director of J. Lyons and Co. Their son Isidore Montague Gluckstein (1890–1975) became managing director, then chairman, then president of J. Lyons and Co.
