= Montague Gluckstein (businessman, born 1886) =

British businessman (1886–1958)

Major Montague Isidore Gluckstein, OBE (1886–1958) was chairman of J. Lyons and Co. from 1950 to 1956, when he was succeeded by Isidore Montague Gluckstein.

He was the son of Isidore Gluckstein (1851–1920) and his wife Rose Cohen (1851–1908).

Gluckstein took over as chairman from his relative Harry Salmon, who held the post from 1941 to 1950.

Major Gluckstein was involved in the post-war negotiations for a Jewish state, and was described as "a Pukka Sahib anti-Zionist British Jew".

He married Hannah Joseph (b. c. 1889).
