= William Ambrose (politician) =

British politician (1832–1908)

Ambrose in 1895.

William Ambrose KC (22 April 1832 – 18 January 1908) was an English judge and Conservative Party politician who sat in the House of Commons from 1885 to 1899.

== Life and career ==
Ambrose was born at Chester, the son of Richard and Mary Ambrose. He was called to the bar at Lincoln's Inn in 1859 and migrated to Middle Temple in 1869. In 1874, he became a Queen's Counsel and in 1881 a bencher. At the 1885 general election he was elected as Conservative MP for Harrow. He held the seat until 1899 when he resigned on being appointed a Master in Lunacy.

== Personal life ==
Ambrose married Georgianna Mary Anne Jones, daughter of William Jones of Camden in 1866 and had several children. The couple lived in 1881 at Westover, West Heath Road, Child's Hill, then narrowly part of Hendon, Middlesex. Ambrose's home as at 1909, per his probate, re-sworn at the sum of £25,315 (rounded) (equivalent to £3,000,000 in 2023) was still that large house "Westover" which enjoyed 2.5 acres (1.0 ha) postally and so often considered Hampstead, but not in the County of London, rather a true part of Middlesex run by Middlesex County Council of which he was a longer-term representative, an alderman.

== Death ==
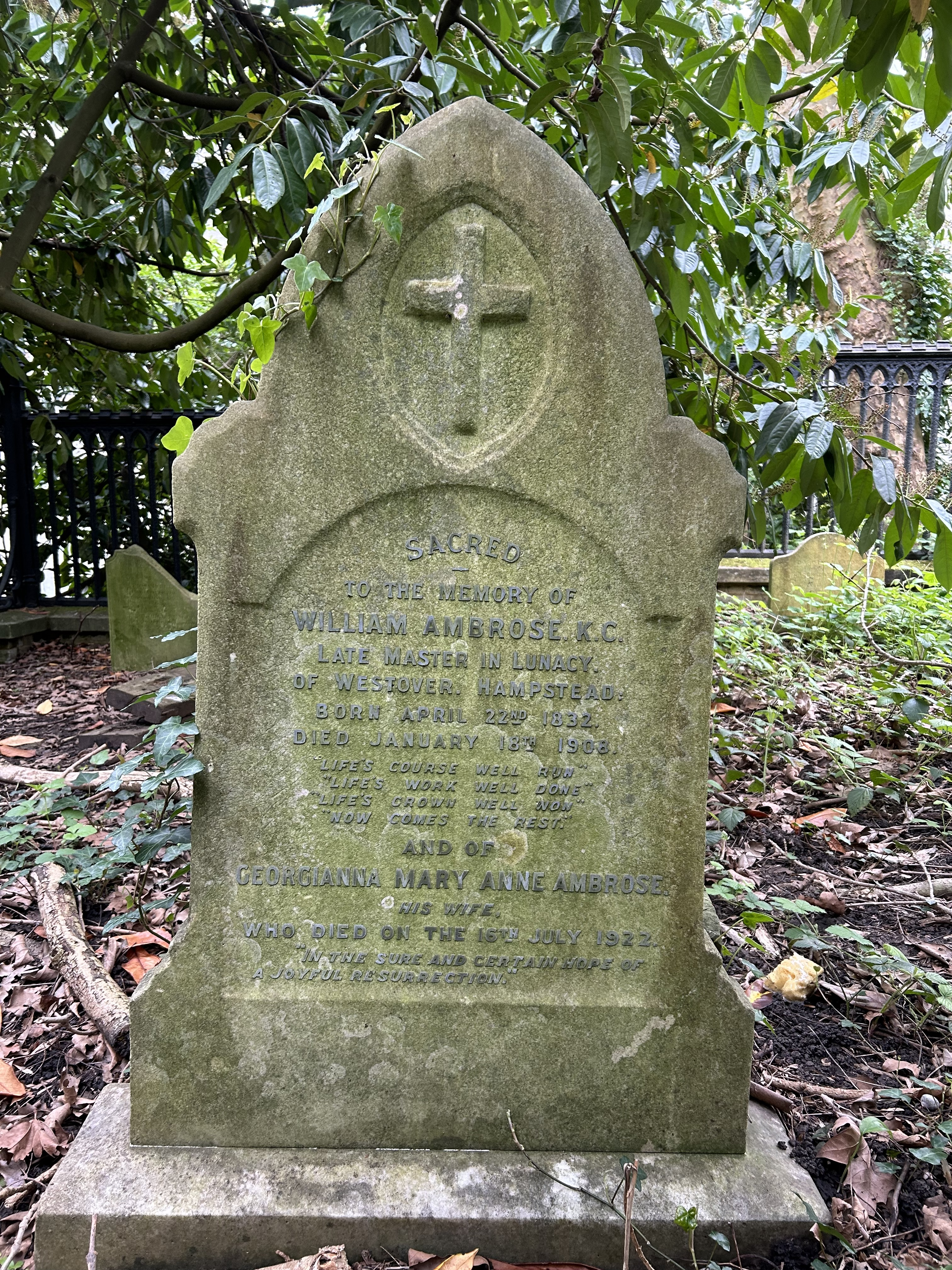
Grave of William Ambrose in Highgate Cemetery

He is buried on the western side of Highgate Cemetery with his wife and her parents.

Parliament of the United Kingdom
New constituency	Member of Parliament for Harrow; 1885 – 1899	Succeeded by Irwin Cox
