= The Taste (British TV series) =

British cooking game show

- Genre: Cooking
- Judges: Anthony Bourdain; Nigella Lawson; Ludo Lefebvre
- Voices of: George Irving
- Country of origin: United Kingdom
- Original language: English
- No. of series: 1
- No. of episodes: 10

Production
- Running time: 60 minutes (inc. adverts)
- Production company: CPL Productions

Original release
- Network: Channel 4
- Release: 7 January – 11 March 2014

Related
- The Taste (U.S.)

The Taste is a British cooking game show that aired on Channel 4 from 7 January to 11 March 2014. The judges and mentors are English chef and TV personality Nigella Lawson, American chef and food writer Anthony Bourdain and French chef Ludo Lefebvre.

== Format ==
The UK version followed the U.S. format, but with only 12 contestants (three teams of four) taking part. The general format sees contestants (a mixture of professional chefs and home cooks) present spoonfuls of food to impress the judges, Nigella Lawson, Anthony Bourdain and Ludo Lefebvre, and avoid weekly elimination.

The first episode, the auditions, somewhat resemble the blind auditions featured in The Voice, with a number of hopefuls preparing spoonfuls of food and the mentors judging them, unaware of the person who has cooked it. Afterwards, the judges meet the cook, and decide if they want them as part of their team or not. If more than one judge offers the contestant a place on their team, they get to choose between them. This process continues until the judges have four people each in their kitchens.

The following episodes consist of two challenges. In the first challenge, with the help of their mentors, the contestants prepare a spoonful of food to impress a guest judge. Each spoon must follow a particular criterion or brief chosen by the guest judge, relating to the week's theme. The mentor of each kitchen (Lawson, Bourdain and Lefebvre) then pick the best spoon from their kitchen to be presented to the guest judge. The guest judge then tastes each spoon and decides which is the best. The contestant who made the guest judge's favourite spoon receives immunity from the week's elimination.

The elimination challenge consists of the contestants preparing a spoon that fits in with the episode's theme. The mentors blind judge each spoon, and decide on the best dish, and the bottom three dishes. The bottom three discuss what went wrong with their respective mentors, and the mentors decide whom to send home.

== Judges ==
Nigella Lawson is the head judge and mentor. She is joined by Anthony Bourdain and Ludo Lefebvre, who both appear alongside her in the US version. The show ran for ten episodes which span 60 minutes; each team will have four contestants. Channel 4 will broadcast The Taste UK in 2014 and then broadcast the original US version later in the year.

There was some speculation after Lawson's divorce case with Charles Saatchi, specifically the release of photos which appeared to show Saatchi with his hands around Lawson's neck, that she may not continue with the show, but Channel 4 continued with production; and confirmed that the show would continue to be shown on 7 January 2014.

== Contestants ==
The series began on 7 January 2014 when the three mentors picked the four contestants they wanted to join their kitchens.

Name	Occupation	Age	Mentor	Status
Barry Johnston	Charity worker	27	Bourdain	Eliminated 1st on 14 January 2014
Claire Coutinho	Supper club host	28	Lawson	Eliminated 2nd on 21 January 2014
James Sherwin	Nurse	34	Lefebvre	Eliminated 3rd on 28 January 2014
Justin Akpa	Junior sous chef	28	Bourdain	Eliminated 4th on 4 February 2014
Raj Bahra	Tax accountant	29	Lawson	Eliminated 5th on 11 February 2014
Kirsty MacKinnon	Private chef	28	Lefebvre	Eliminated 6th on 18 February 2014
Guan Chua	Food blogger	26	Bourdain	Eliminated 7th on 25 February 2014
Kalpna Mistry	Science teacher	47	Lawson	Eliminated 8th on 4 March 2014
Chloe Campbell	Nanny	24	Lefebvre	Third place on 11 March 2014
Dixie Innes	Café chef	26	Bourdain	Runner-up on 11 March 2014
Kelly Sealey	Cookery tutor	32	Lawson	Runner-up on 11 March 2014
Debbie Halls-Evans	Delicatessen owner	43	Lefebvre	Winner on 11 March 2014

== Production ==
A British version of ABC's The Taste was commissioned by Channel 4 in July 2013. This marked Lawson's return to Channel 4 after a decade away from it. The format was sold to the UK broadcaster by its distributor, Red Arrow International. The series was filmed during September and October 2013 at the Pinewood Studios. The promotional trailer caused a stir on Twitter due to its risqué nature.
