= James Gibb (British politician) =

- James Gibb (published in the Illustrated London News)
- Born: 3 May 1844
- Died: 23 June 1910 (aged 66)
- Occupation: Insurance broker

James Gibb (3 May 1844 – 23 June 1910) was a British Liberal Party politician in the Nonconformist tradition.

== Background ==
A son of James Gibb of Edinburgh and Margaret Wilson of Hawick, Roxburghshire, he was educated privately. In 1873, he married Helen Nimmo, daughter of Rev. David Nimmo, Congregational Minister. They had four sons and one daughter.

== Career ==
He was an insurance broker and underwriter at Lloyd's of London. He was Liberal MP for the Harrow Division of Middlesex from January 1906 until January 1910, serving just one term. He had not stood for parliament before, though he had always taken an interest in politics. He was able to pay for a certain amount of his election campaign expenses and was adopted. He gained the seat from the Conservatives at the 1906 general election but did not defend the seat at the following general election, when he retired. He died in June 1910.

Parliament of the United Kingdom
Preceded by Irwin Cox	Member of Parliament for Harrow; 1906 – January 1910	Succeeded by Harry Deeley
