= Harrow (constituency) =

Parliamentary constituency in the United Kingdom, 1885–1945

Harrow (UK Parliament constituency)
- Former county constituency for the House of Commons
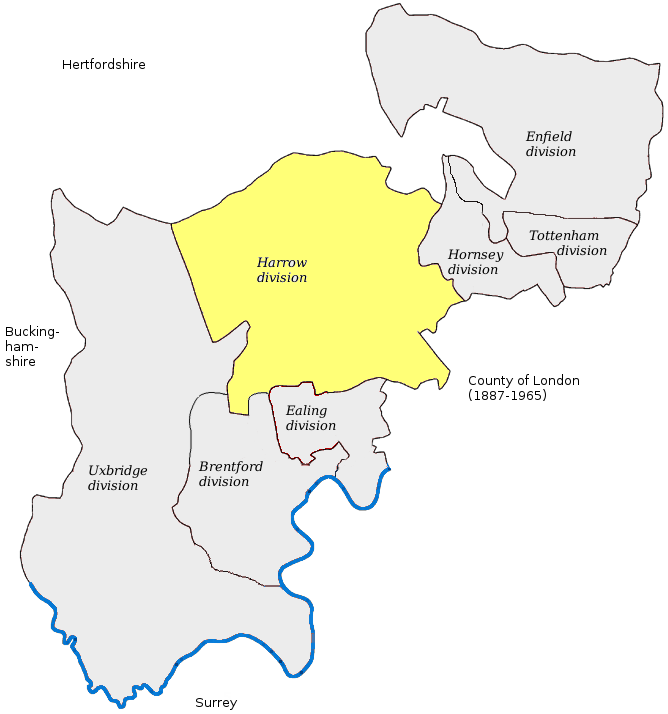
- Harrow 1885-1918

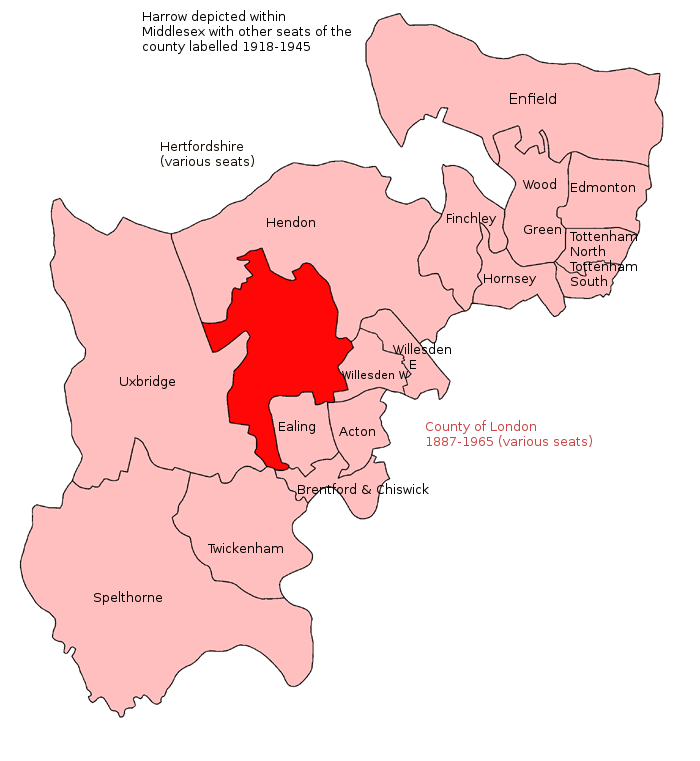
- Harrow 1918-1945

1885–1945
- Seats: one
- Created from: Middlesex
- Replaced by: Wembley North and Wembley South; Harrow East (part of), Harrow West (part of) and Ealing West (minor contribution to)
- During its existence contributed to new seat(s) of: Hendon (all), Willesden West (all) and Willesden East (all)

Harrow was a constituency of the House of Commons of the UK Parliament 1885—1945 in Middlesex, a traditional county; it covered an area forming part of the north-west of today's Greater London. It returned one Member of Parliament (MP).

The constituency was created for the 1885 general election, substantially reduced on the creation of more seats in 1918 and abolished for the 1945 general election.

The 2023 Periodic Review of Westminster constituencies initially proposed recreating the constituency, with boundaries similar to that of Harrow West.

== Boundaries ==
- 1885–1918: The Parishes of Edgware, Great Stanmore, Harrow-on-the-Hill, Hendon, Kingsbury, Little Stanmore, Pinner, Twyford Abbey and Willesden (and the area in the Parliamentary Boroughs of Hampstead, Marylebone, Paddington and St Pancras; for many wealthy voters this sub-provision gave a choice of which seat to vote for).
- 1918–1945: The Urban Districts of Harrow on the Hill, Greenford, Wealdstone, and Wembley and part (the non-detached part) of Hanwell.

== Members of Parliament ==
| Election | Member | Party |
|---|---|---|
| 1885 | William Ambrose | Conservative |
| 1899 by-election | Irwin Cox | Conservative |
| 1906 | James Gibb | Liberal |
| Jan. 1910 | Harry Mallaby-Deeley | Conservative |
| 1918 | Oswald Mosley | Conservative |
| 1922 | Oswald Mosley | Independent |
| 1924 | Oswald Mosley | Labour |
| 1924 | Sir Isidore Salmon | Conservative |
| 1941 by-election | Norman Bower | Conservative |
| 1945 | constituency abolished: see Harrow East and Harrow West | |

== Election results ==
=== Elections in the 1880s ===
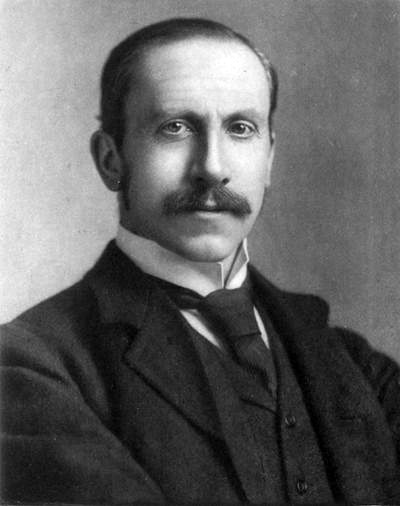
Milner

General election 1885: Harrow
| Party | Candidate | Votes | % | ±% |
|---|---|---|---|---|
| Conservative | William Ambrose | 4,214 | 56.5 | |
| Liberal | Alfred Milner | 3,241 | 43.5 | |
| Majority | | 973 | 13.0 | |
| Turnout | | 7,455 | 71.4 | |
| Registered electors | | 10,438 | | |
| Conservative win (new seat) | | | | |

General election 1886: Harrow
| Party | Candidate | Votes | % | ±% |
|---|---|---|---|---|
| Conservative | William Ambrose | Unopposed | | |
| Conservative hold | | | | |

=== Elections in the 1890s ===
Ambrose

General election 1892: Harrow
| Party | Candidate | Votes | % | ±% |
|---|---|---|---|---|
| Conservative | William Ambrose | 6,047 | 63.8 | N/A |
| Liberal | Isaac Thomas Sadler | 3,428 | 36.2 | New |
| Majority | | 2,619 | 27.6 | N/A |
| Turnout | | 9,475 | 67.8 | N/A |
| Registered electors | | 13,966 | | |
| Conservative hold | | Swing | N/A | |

General election 1895: Harrow
| Party | Candidate | Votes | % | ±% |
|---|---|---|---|---|
| Conservative | William Ambrose | Unopposed | | |
| Conservative hold | | | | |

Ambrose is appointed Attorney-General of the Duchy of Lancaster, requiring a by-election.

1895 Harrow by-election
| Party | Candidate | Votes | % | ±% |
|---|---|---|---|---|
| Conservative | William Ambrose | Unopposed | | |
| Conservative hold | | | | |

Ambrose resigned after being appointed as a Master in Lunacy, requiring a by-election.

1899 Harrow by-election
| Party | Candidate | Votes | % | ±% |
|---|---|---|---|---|
| Conservative | Irwin Cox | 6,303 | 54.8 | N/A |
| Liberal | Corrie Grant | 5,198 | 45.2 | New |
| Majority | | 1,105 | 9.6 | N/A |
| Turnout | | 11,501 | 62.4 | N/A |
| Registered electors | | 18,444 | | |
| Conservative hold | | Swing | N/A | |

=== Elections in the 1900s ===
General election 1900: Harrow
| Party | Candidate | Votes | % | ±% |
|---|---|---|---|---|
| Conservative | Irwin Cox | Unopposed | | |
| Conservative hold | | | | |

Gibb

General election 1906: Harrow
| Party | Candidate | Votes | % | ±% |
|---|---|---|---|---|
| Liberal | James Gibb | 11,393 | 50.9 | New |
| Liberal Unionist | William Peel | 10,977 | 49.1 | N/A |
| Majority | | 416 | 1.8 | N/A |
| Turnout | | 22,370 | 78.1 | N/A |
| Registered electors | | 28,627 | | |
| Liberal gain from Conservative | | Swing | N/A | |

=== Elections in the 1910s ===
General election January 1910: Harrow
| Party | Candidate | Votes | % | ±% |
|---|---|---|---|---|
| Conservative | Harry Mallaby-Deeley | 16,761 | 55.3 | +6.2 |
| Liberal | Percy Harris | 13,575 | 44.7 | −6.2 |
| Majority | | 3,186 | 10.6 | N/A |
| Turnout | | 30,336 | 85.7 | +7.6 |
| Conservative gain from Liberal | | Swing | +6.2 | |

General election December 1910: Harrow
| Party | Candidate | Votes | % | ±% |
|---|---|---|---|---|
| Conservative | Harry Mallaby-Deeley | Unopposed | | |
| Conservative hold | | | | |

General Election 1914–15:

Another General Election was required to take place before the end of 1915. The political parties had been making preparations for an election to take place and by July 1914, the following candidates had been selected;

- Unionist: Harry Mallaby-Deeley
- Liberal: H. E. A. Cotton

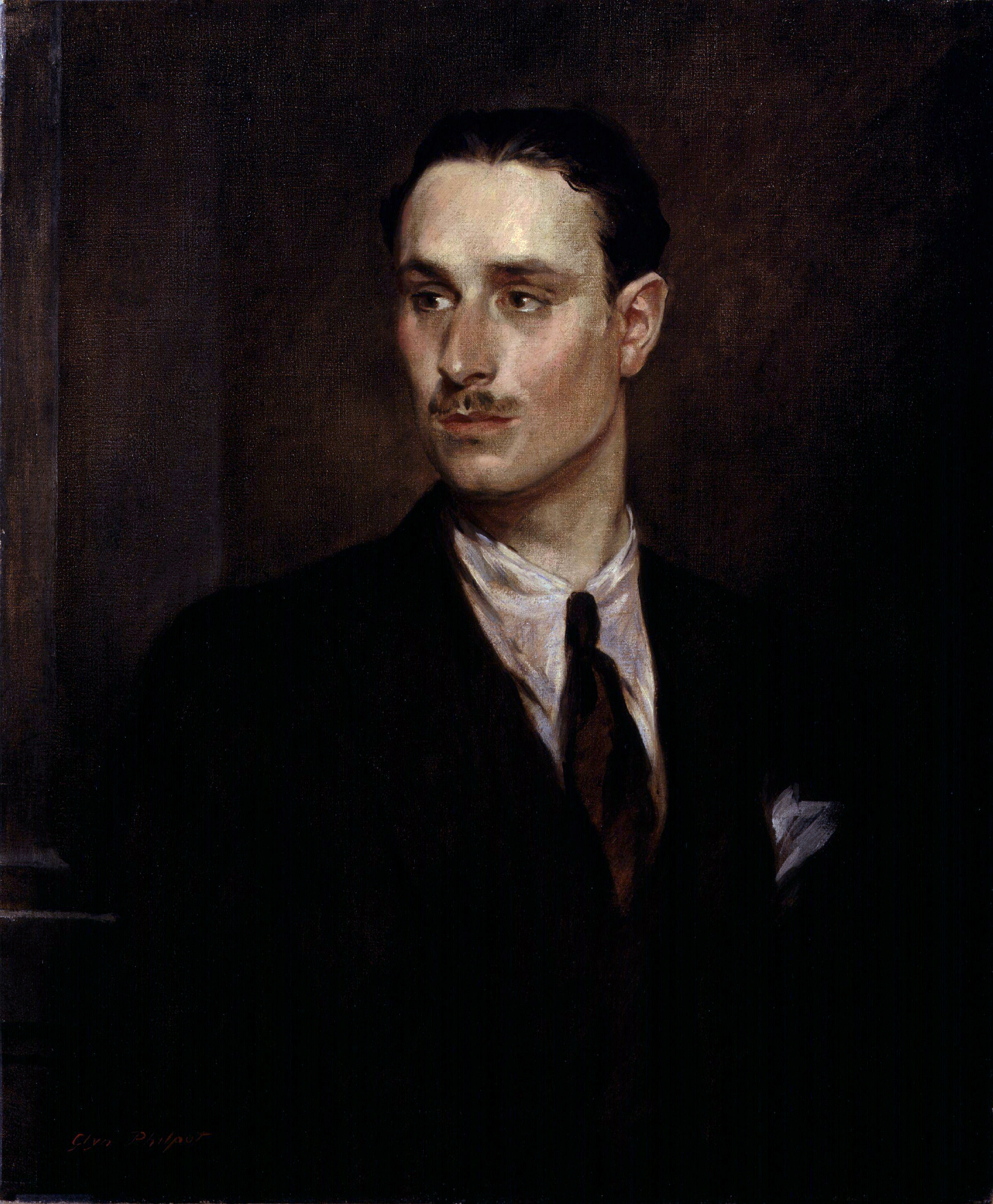
Mosley

General election 1918: Harrow
| Party | | Candidate | Votes | % | ±% |
|---|---|---|---|---|---|
| C | Unionist | Oswald Mosley | 13,959 | 82.3 | N/A |
| | Independent | Arthur Robert Chamberlayne | 3,007 | 17.7 | New |
| Majority | | | 10,934 | 64.6 | N/A |
| Turnout | | | 16,957 | 50.4 | N/A |
| Registered electors | | | 33,651 | | |
| | Unionist hold | | Swing | N/A | |
C indicates candidate endorsed by the coalition government.

Chamberlayne was nominated by the non-party Harrow Electors League

=== Elections in the 1920s ===
General election 1922: Harrow
| Party | Candidate | Votes | % | ±% |
|---|---|---|---|---|
| Independent | Oswald Mosley | 15,290 | 66.0 | N/A |
| Unionist | Charles Ward-Jackson | 7,868 | 34.0 | −48.3 |
| Majority | | 7,422 | 32.0 | N/A |
| Turnout | | 23,158 | 65.1 | +14.7 |
| Registered electors | | 35,592 | | |
| Independent gain from Unionist | | Swing | | |

General election 1923: Harrow
| Party | Candidate | Votes | % | ±% |
|---|---|---|---|---|
| Independent | Oswald Mosley | 14,079 | 59.9 | −6.1 |
| Unionist | Edward Hugh Frederick Morris | 9,433 | 40.1 | +6.1 |
| Majority | | 4,646 | 19.8 | −12.2 |
| Turnout | | 23,512 | 64.5 | −0.6 |
| Registered electors | | 36,475 | | |
| Independent hold | | Swing | −6.1 | |

General election 1924: Harrow
| Party | Candidate | Votes | % | ±% |
|---|---|---|---|---|
| Unionist | Isidore Salmon | 16,526 | 54.5 | +14.4 |
| Labour | Kenneth Lindsay | 9,507 | 31.3 | New |
| Liberal | Sir Robert Blair | 4,320 | 14.2 | New |
| Majority | | 7,019 | 23.2 | N/A |
| Turnout | | 30,353 | 78.5 | +14.0 |
| Registered electors | | 38,644 | | |
| Unionist gain from Independent | | Swing | | |

General election 1929: Harrow
| Party | Candidate | Votes | % | ±% |
|---|---|---|---|---|
| Unionist | Isidore Salmon | 22,466 | 42.7 | −11.8 |
| Labour | Hubert Beaumont | 15,684 | 29.8 | −1.5 |
| Liberal | Clement Edward Page Taylor | 12,554 | 23.8 | +9.6 |
| Ind. Unionist | WJ Sholl | 1,965 | 3.7 | New |
| Majority | | 6,782 | 12.9 | −10.3 |
| Turnout | | 52,669 | 74.3 | −4.2 |
| Registered electors | | 70,849 | | |
| Unionist hold | | Swing | −5.2 | |

=== Elections in the 1930s ===
General election 1931: Harrow
| Party | Candidate | Votes | % | ±% |
|---|---|---|---|---|
| Conservative | Isidore Salmon | 48,068 | 71.0 | +28.3 |
| Labour | George Sandilands | 14,241 | 21.0 | −8.8 |
| Liberal | Henry Cecil Banting | 5,444 | 8.0 | −15.8 |
| Majority | | 33,827 | 50.0 | +37.1 |
| Turnout | | 67,753 | 72.1 | −2.2 |
| Conservative hold | | Swing | +18.5 | |

General election 1935: Harrow
| Party | Candidate | Votes | % | ±% |
|---|---|---|---|---|
| Conservative | Isidore Salmon | 52,729 | 62.7 | −8.3 |
| Labour | Helen Bentwich | 31,422 | 37.3 | +16.3 |
| Majority | | 21,307 | 25.4 | −24.6 |
| Turnout | | 84,151 | 64.4 | −7.7 |
| Conservative hold | | Swing | -12.3 | |

General Election 1939–40

Another General Election was required to take place before the end of 1940. The political parties had been making preparations for an election to take place and by the Autumn of 1939, the following candidates had been selected;

- Conservative: Isidore Salmon
- Labour: Maurice S Davidson
- British Union: Harry Frisby

=== Elections in the 1940s ===
1941 Harrow by-election
| Party | Candidate | Votes | % | ±% |
|---|---|---|---|---|
| Conservative | Norman Bower | 14,540 | 80.9 | +18.2 |
| Independent Democrat | Winifred Clarice Henney | 3,433 | 19.1 | New |
| Majority | | 11,107 | 61.8 | +36.4 |
| Turnout | | 17,973 | 10.7 | −53.7 |
| Conservative hold | | Swing | | |
