= Norman Bower =

British politician (1907–1990)

Norman Adolph Henry Bower (18 May 1907 – 7 December 1990) was a British Conservative Party politician.

In December 1941, he was elected as Member of Parliament (MP) for Harrow at a by-election following the death of Conservative MP Sir Isidore Salmon. The Harrow constituency was abolished for the 1945 election, when Bower was re-elected to the House of Commons for the new Harrow West constituency. He held the seat comfortably at the 1950 election, but resigned from Parliament in April 1951.

Parliament of the United Kingdom
Preceded by Sir Isidore Salmon	Member of Parliament for Harrow; 1941–1945	Constituency abolished
New constituency	Member of Parliament for Harrow West; 1945–1951	Succeeded by Albert Braithwaite
