= J. Lyons and Co. =

British food and lodging conglomerate

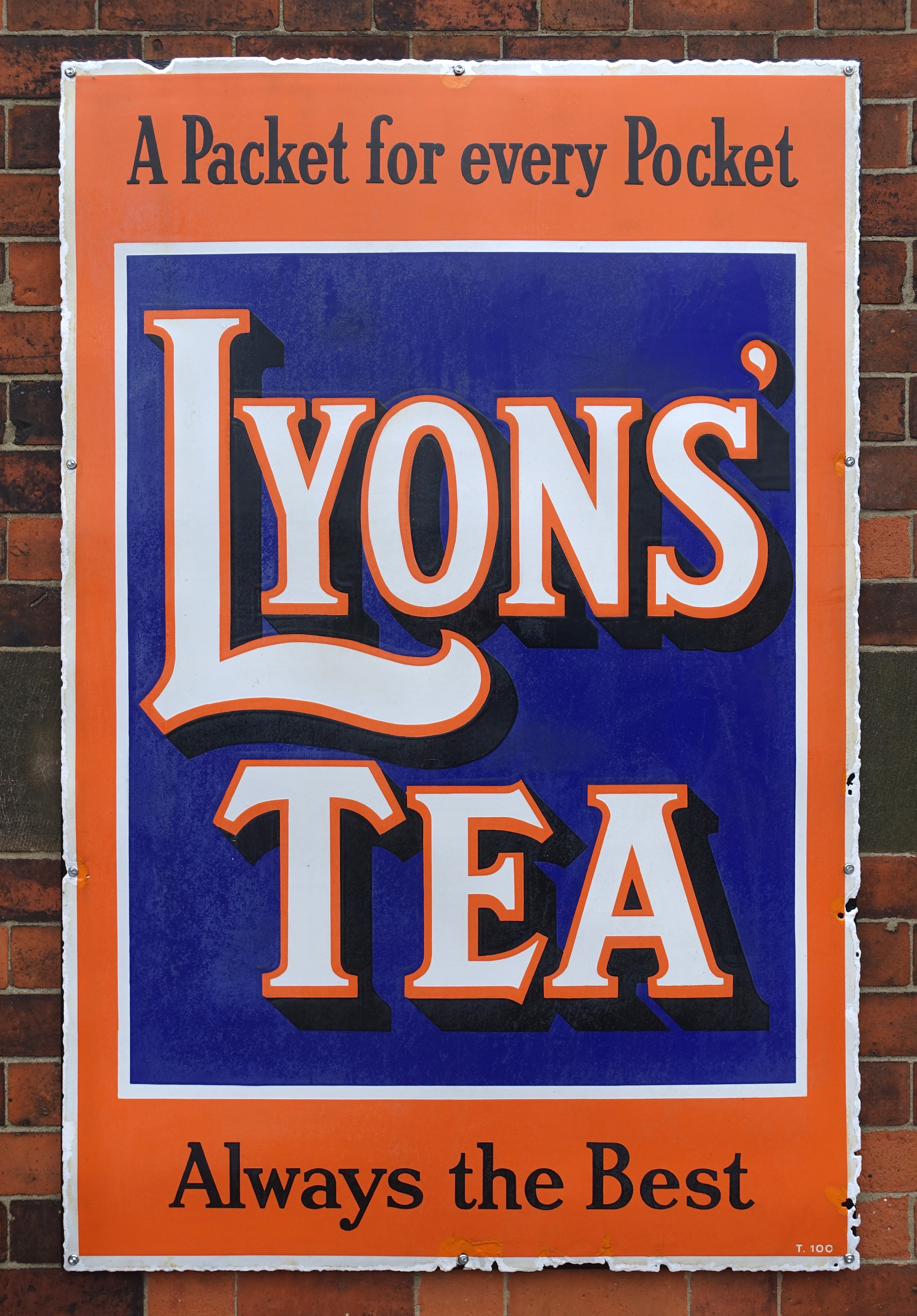
Lyons' Tea advertising sign

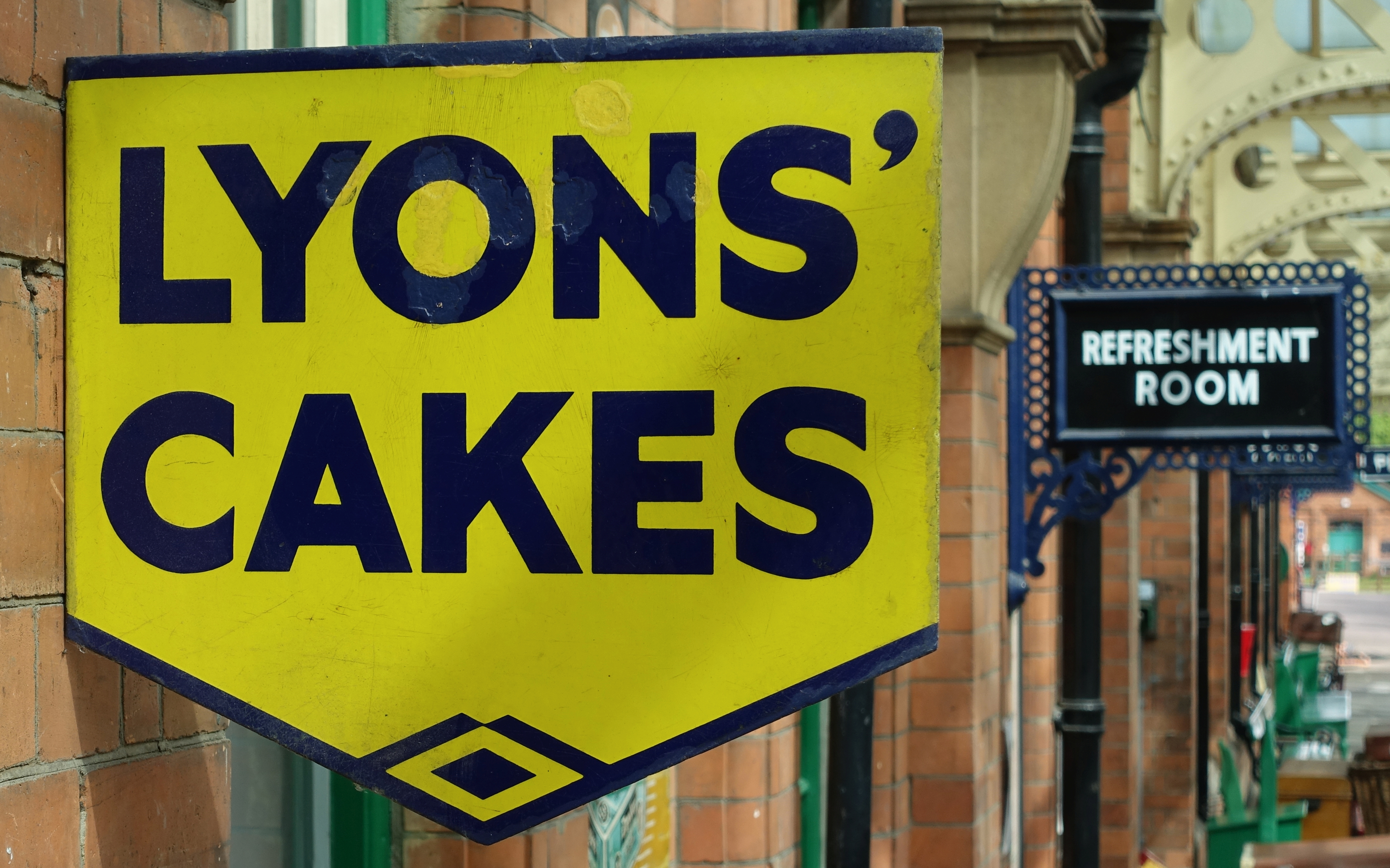
Lyons' Cakes sign

J. Lyons & Co. was a British restaurant chain store, food manufacturing, and hotel conglomerate founded in 1884 by Joseph Lyons and his brothers in law, Isidore and Montague Gluckstein. Lyons' first teashop opened in Piccadilly, London in 1894, and from 1909 they developed into a chain of teashops, with the firm becoming a staple of the High Street in the UK. At its peak the chain numbered around 200 cafes. The teashops provided for tea and coffee, with food choices consisting of hot dishes and sweets, cold dishes and sweets, and buns, cakes and rolls.

Making their first cakes and pastries in 1894, several Lyons cake products are still available on grocers' shelves, including Lyons' treacle tart, Lyons' Bakewell tart, Lyons' Battenberg, and Lyons' trifle sponges, which are sold by Premier Foods. The company is also known for its pioneering use of computers in the office.

== Origins and early history ==
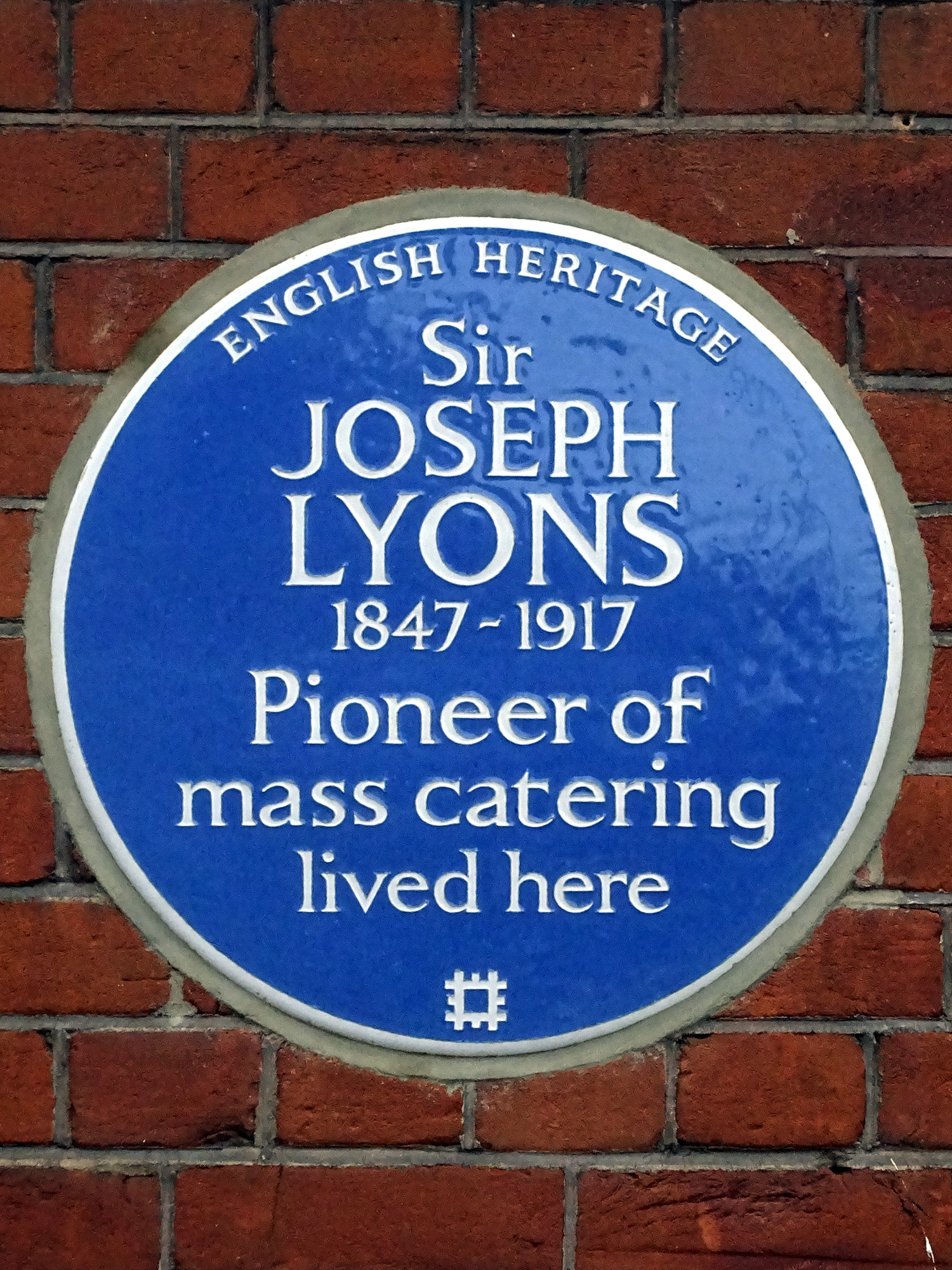
English Heritage blue plaque commemorating co-founder, Joseph Lyons, at Hammersmith Road, London

The company began as a collaboration between a group of entrepreneurs, the professional artist Joseph Lyons and his brothers in law, Isidore and Montague Gluckstein, as a spin off from the Salmon & Gluckstein tobacco company. In 1894 the company started a teashop in Piccadilly, London, and from 1909 developed this into a chain of teashops which would ultimately number around 200 locations. The company also ran high class restaurants, founding the Trocadero in 1895, and hotels including the Strand Palace, opened in 1909, the Regent Palace, opened in 1915, and the Cumberland Hotel, opened in 1933, all in London. In 1918, to increase sales in northern England, Lyons bought the old established tea company Horniman & Sons. From the 1930s Lyons began to develop a pioneering range of teas, biscuits and cakes that were sold in grocery stores across the world. Lyons was appointed to run the company, and it was named after him.

J. Lyons & Co. was a pioneer in introducing computers to business. Between 1951 and 1963, the company manufactured and sold a range of LEO (Lyons Electronic Office) computers.

== Products and image ==
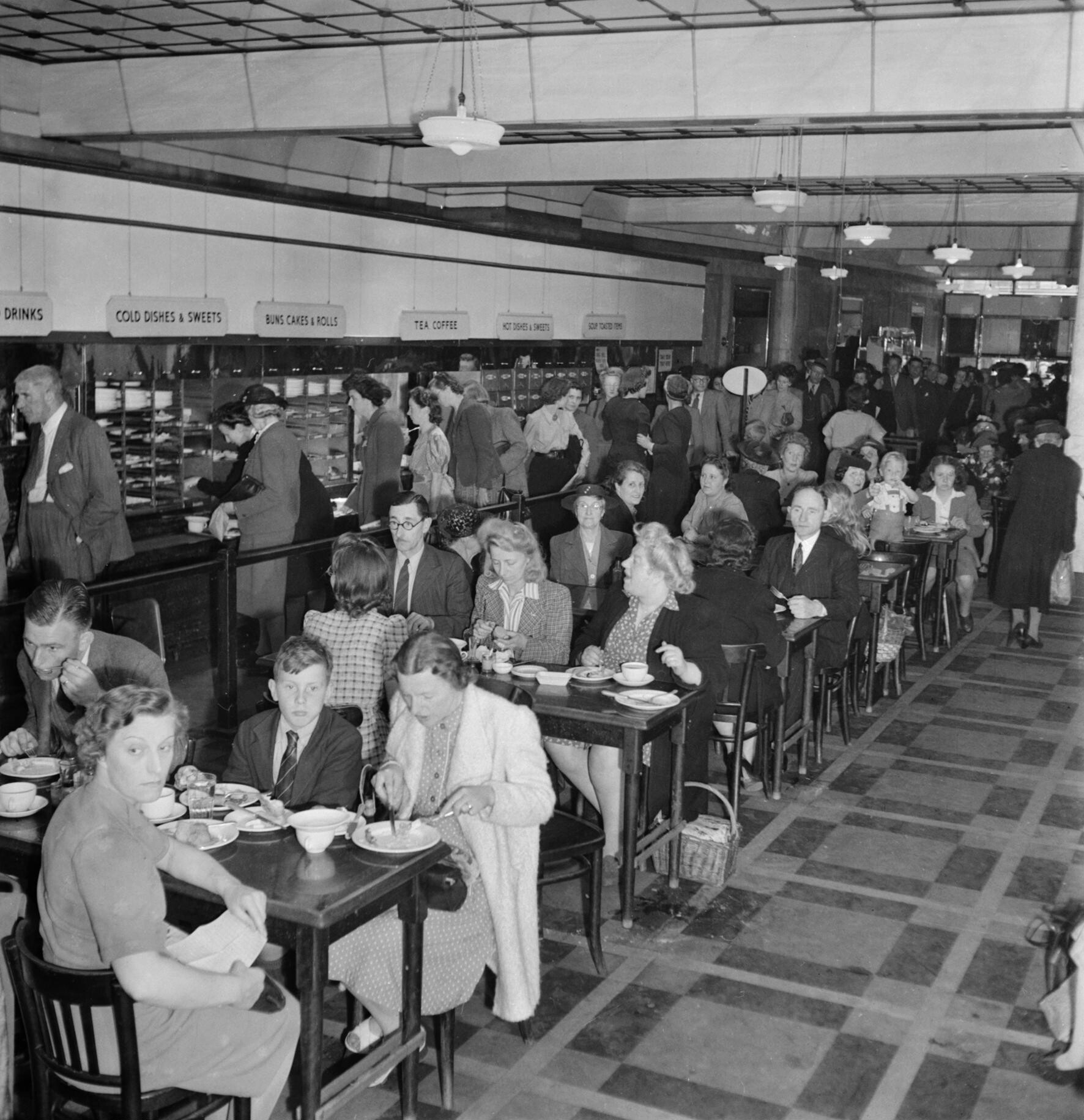
Lyons' Cafe in Reading, Berkshire, 1945

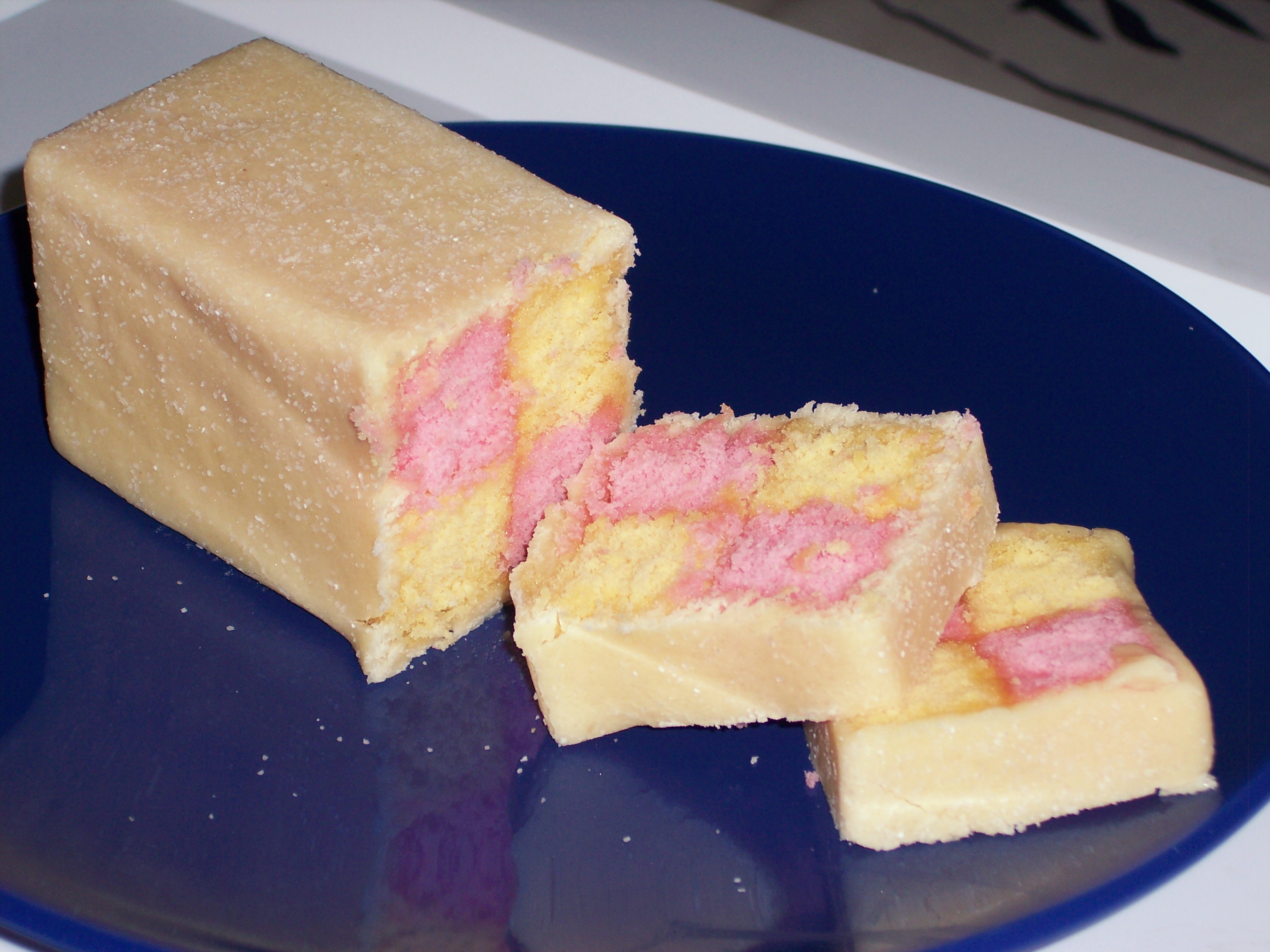
Lyons' Battenberg cake, produced in the 1930s

The company was a substantial food manufacturer, with factories at Cadby Hall in Hammersmith, and from 1921 at Greenford, producing bread, cakes, pies, tea, coffee and ice cream. Lyons branded cakes included treacle tarts, Lyons Bakewell tart, Lyons Battenberg, and Lyons trifle sponges.

To the public, J. Lyons & Co. were best known for their chain of teashops which opened from 1894 and finally closed in 1981, and for the Lyons Corner Houses in the West End of London. The teashops provided for tea and coffee, with hot dishes and sweets, cold dishes and sweets, and buns, cakes and rolls. Lyons' teashops were slightly more up market than their ABC (Aerated Bread Company) competitors. They were notable for their interior design, from the 1920s Oliver P. Bernard being consultant artistic director. Until the 1940s they had a certain working-class chic, but by the 1950s and 1960s they were quick stops for busy shoppers where one could drink a cup of tea and eat a snack or an inexpensive meal. The teashops always had a bakery counter at the front, and their signs, Art Nouveau gold lettering on white, were a familiar landmark. Before the Second World War service was to the table by uniformed waitresses, known as 'Nippies'; after the war the teashops converted to cafeteria service.

=== Corner Houses ===
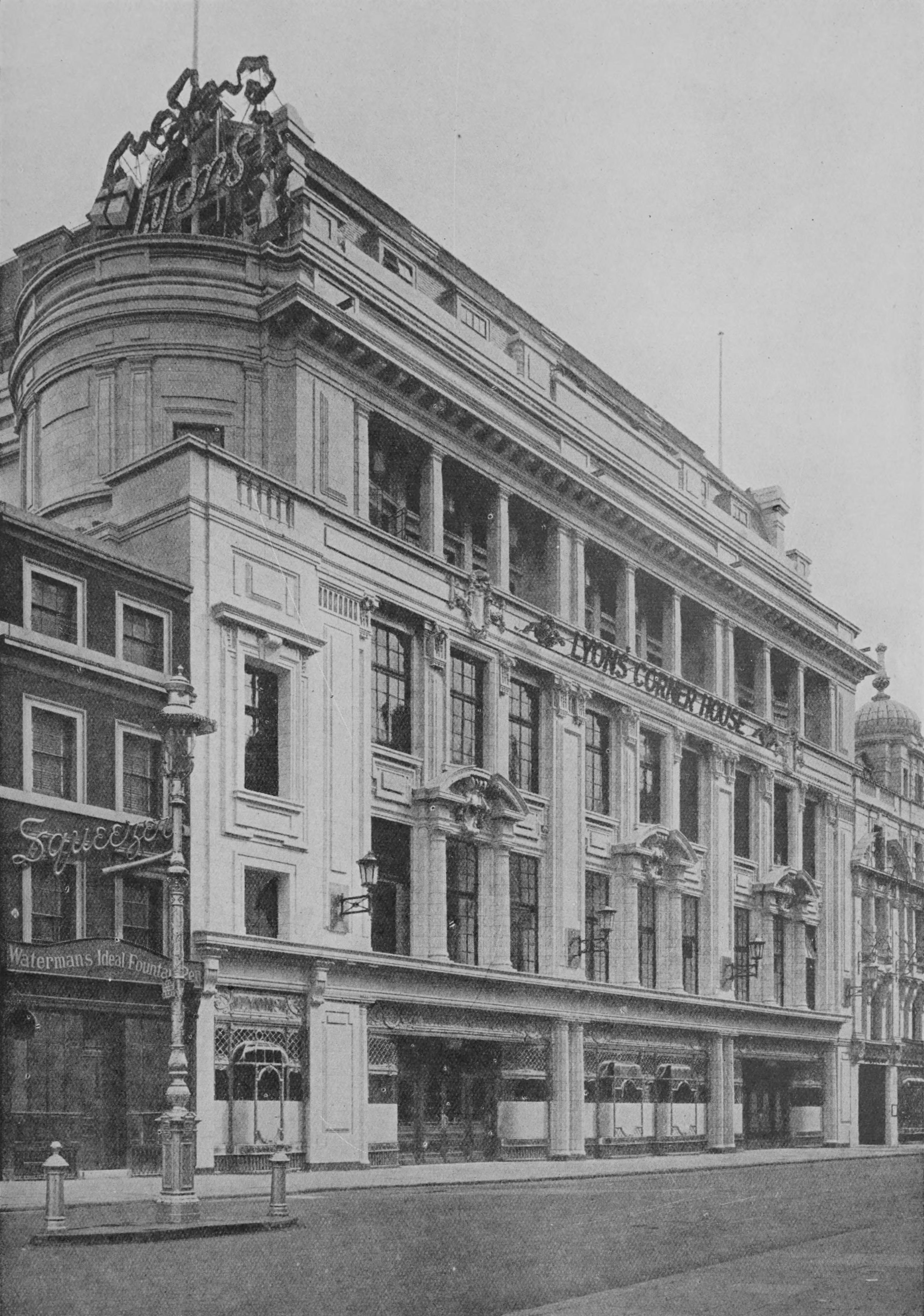
The Corner House on Coventry Street, designed in 1923 by F. J. Wills

Lyons' Corner Houses, which first appeared in 1909 and remained until 1977, were noted for their art deco style. Situated on or near the corners of Coventry Street, Strand and Tottenham Court Road, they and the Maisons Lyons at Marble Arch and in Shaftesbury Avenue were large buildings on four or five floors, the ground floor of which was a food hall with counters for delicatessen, sweets and chocolates, cakes, fruit, flowers and other products. In addition, they possessed hairdressing salons, telephone booths, theatre booking agencies and at one period a twice-a-day food delivery service. On the other floors were several restaurants, each with a different theme and all with their own musicians. For a time the Corner Houses were open 24 hours a day, and at their peak each branch employed around 400 staff. They featured window displays, and, in the post-war period, the Corner Houses were smarter and grander than the local tea shops. The artist Kay Lipton designed all the windows for the Corner Houses under the supervision of Norman Joseph, the director post-war. Between 1896 and 1965 Lyons owned the Trocadero, which was similar in size and style to the Corner Houses.

=== Restaurants ===
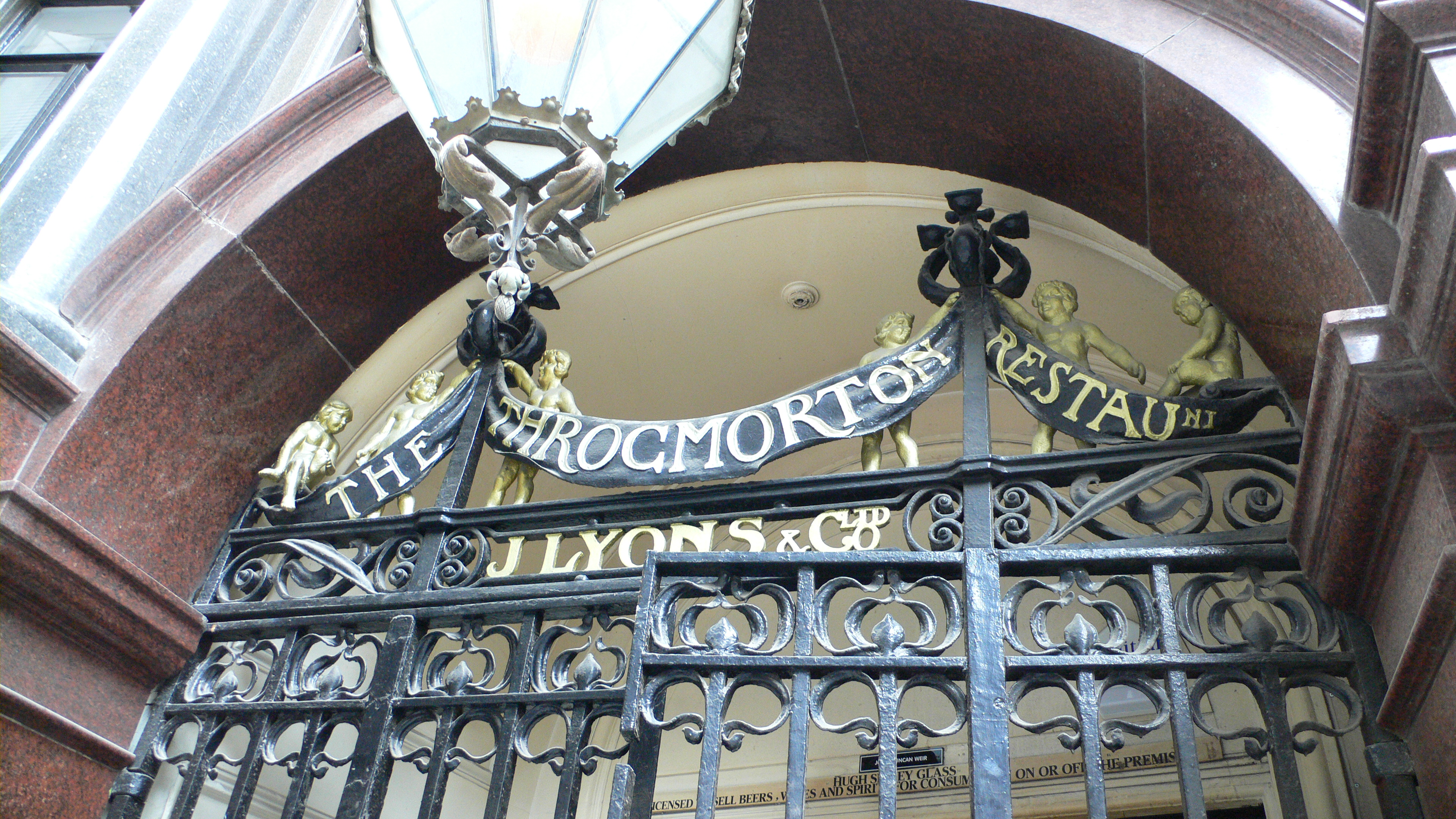
Entrance to Throgmorton restaurant

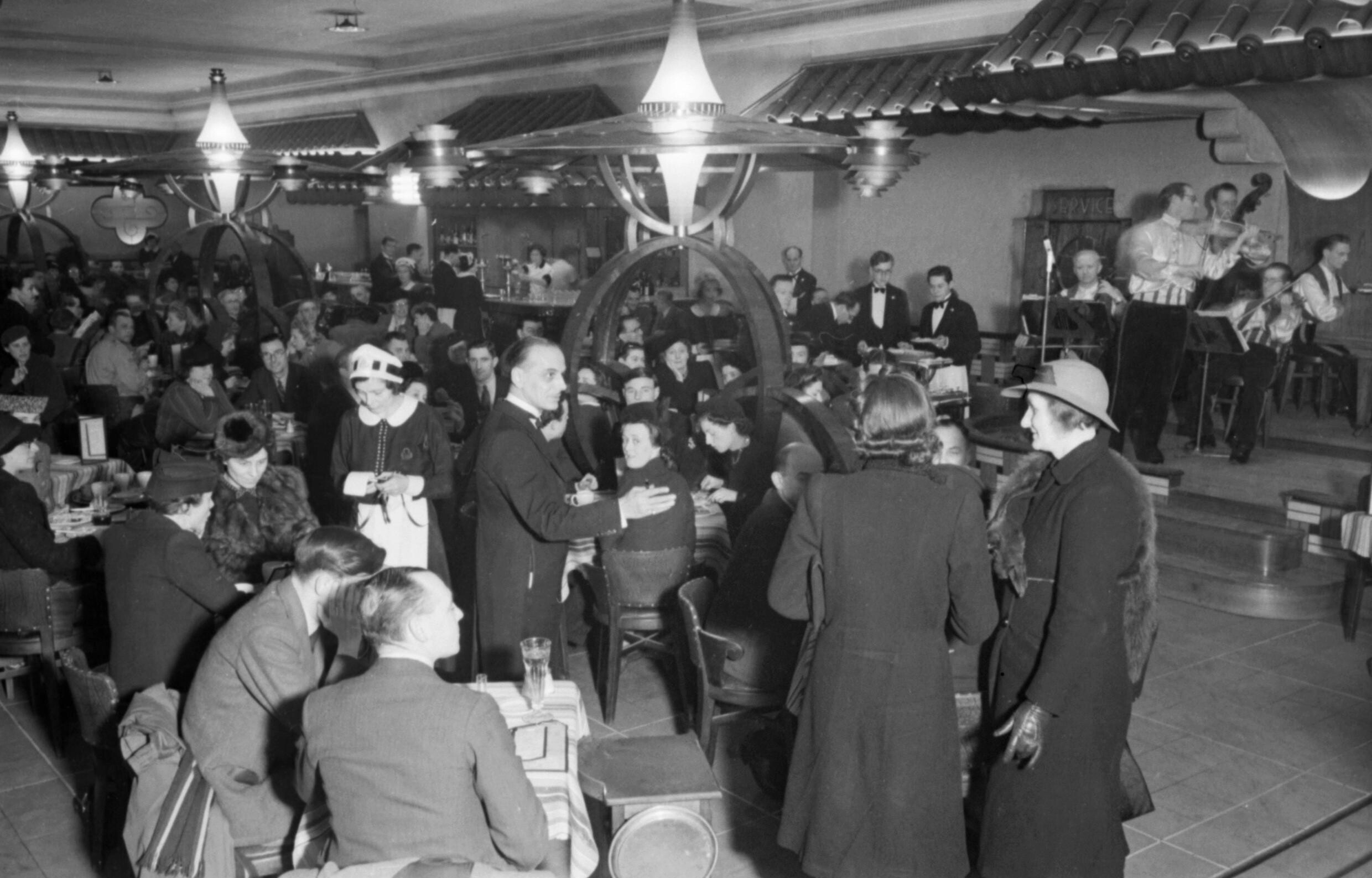
Lyons' Corner House Brasserie with band, Coventry Street, London, 1942

As well as the tea shops and Corner Houses, Lyons ran other large restaurants such as the Angel Cafe Restaurant in Islington and the Throgmorton in Throgmorton Street in the City of London. Its chains have included Steak Houses (1961–1988), Wimpy Bars (1953–1976), Baskin-Robbins (1974–present) and Dunkin' Donuts (1989–present).

=== Hotels ===
The Regent Palace Hotel, Glasshouse Street, London was operated by Strand Hotels Limited, a subsidiary of J. Lyons and Company and opened on 16 May 1915. Strand Hotels also operated the Cumberland Hotel (Marble Arch, London), Kingsley Hotel, Park Court Hotel, Windsor Hotel, White's Hotel and the Strand Palace Hotel after the inception of Strand Hotels Limited. The last London hotel that they operated until the demise of the group in the mid-1970s was the Tower Hotel situated by Tower Bridge in London.

=== Biscuits company ===
In 1938, Lyons purchased the Bee Bee Biscuit Company, which manufactured biscuits from its factories in Blackpool. Six years later, Lyons changed the company's name to Symbol Biscuits Ltd. and began selling biscuits under the Symbol and Lyons brand names: one of their innovations was Maryland Cookies in 1956. In 1990, Lyons changed the Symbol Biscuits name to Lyons Biscuits Ltd.

== Other activities ==
=== Supporting the war effort ===
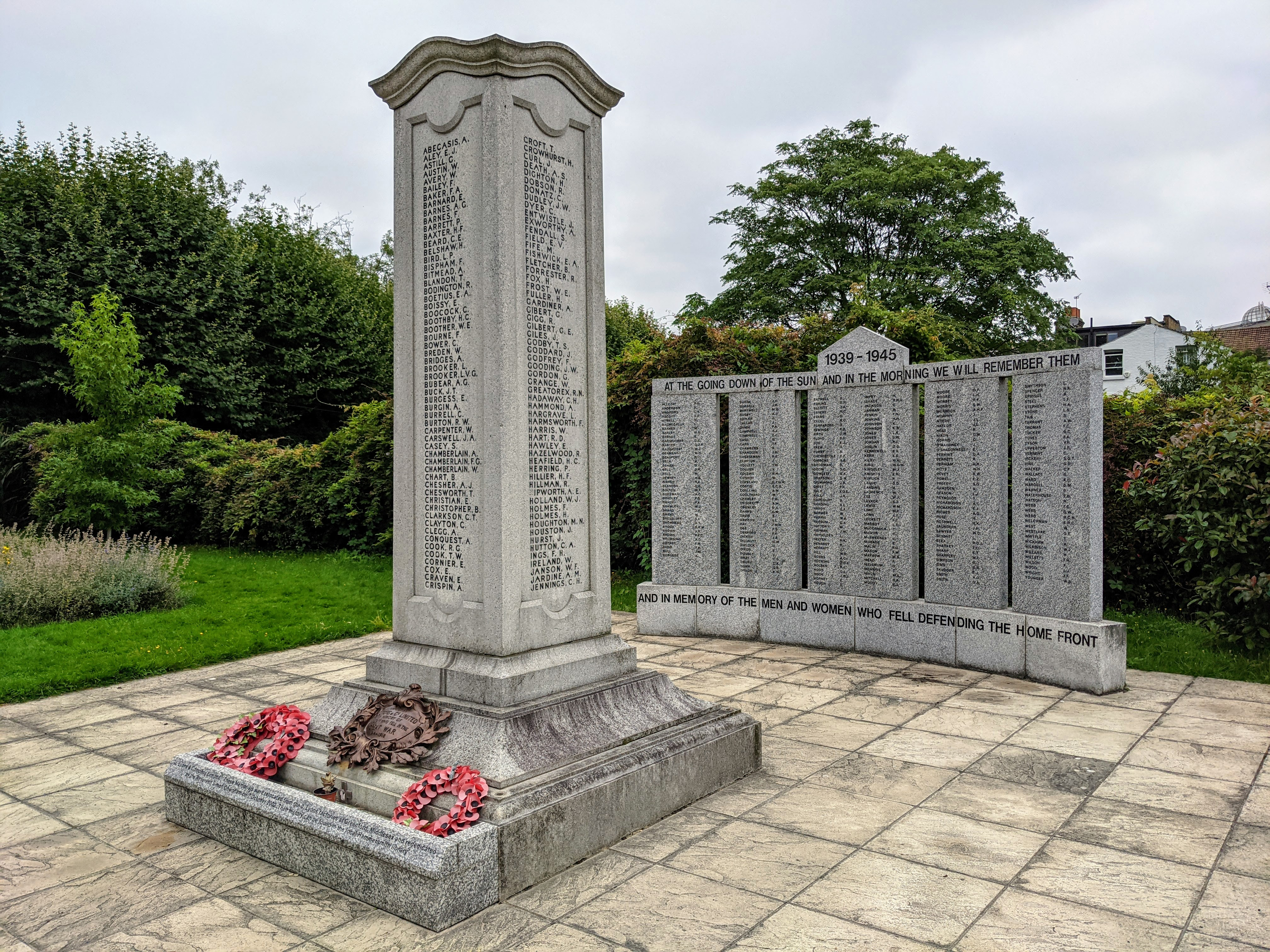
Lyons' memorials to World Wars I (column) and II (wall) at Margravine Cemetery, London

The rearmament period just before World War II saw a big expansion in the number of Royal Ordnance Factories (ROFs), which were British government-owned. However, due to shortages of management resources some ROFs were run as agency factories; and J. Lyons and Co. ran at least one, ROF Elstow. The management and stock control systems needed in the ROFs, in respect of control of raw materials and "perishable" finished products, were somewhat similar to those used in the catering business; and J. Lyons was ideally suited to this task. They do not appear to have any involvement in managing these after 1945, when the ROFs started to run down.

=== Princess Elizabeth and Philip Mountbatten's wedding cake ===
Princess Elizabeth and Philip Mountbatten were offered many cakes from well-wishers around the world for their wedding on 20 November 1947. Of these they accepted only 12, including one from J. Lyons and Co.

They created a three-tiered cake, mounted on a silver stand, made by F E Jacobs, chief decorator of J Lyons' Ornamental Department. It stood 1.8 metres high and weighed 63 kg. The first and second tiers featured specially commissioned 10 cm blue and white Wedgwood Jasper vases set in alcoves behind silver pillars, with smaller vases on the third tier. The cake's panels depicted Princess Elizabeth's coat of arms, the couple's initials and a Naval crown. Atop the third tier sat a larger Jasper vase, filled with fresh flowers and trailing orange blossom.

=== Pioneering use of computers in business ===
"It was Lyons' money – and the brilliance of the computing pioneers Sir Maurice Wilkes, John Pinkerton and David Caminer – that gave the world its first business computer."

— Sam Jones in The Guardian.

The top management of Lyons, with its background in the use of mechanical adding machines, saw the necessity of new electrical computers for organising the distribution of cakes and other highly perishable goods. They, therefore, substantially financed the University of Cambridge's Electronic Delay Storage Automatic Calculator (EDSAC) which was the second electronic digital stored-program computer to go into regular service, and built their own programmable digital computers. They became the first user of these in businesses, with the LEO I digital computer: the Lyons Electronic Office I, designed and built by Dr John Pinkerton under the leadership of John Simmons. It handled the company's accounts and logistics. Lyons also included the weather forecast to ensure goods carried by their "fresh produce" delivery vans were not wasted in large quantities. Google chairman Eric Schmidt called this "the world's first office computer", built in 1951. A subsidiary LEO Computers Ltd was formed in 1954 and went on to build 11 Leo II and 94 Leo III computers that were sold worldwide. One of the ardent users of LEO computers was the General Post Office (GPO), who bought them in the mid/late 1960s to produce telephone bills. They were kept going until 1981, helped by buying other companies' redundant machines and using them for spare parts.

== Decline ==
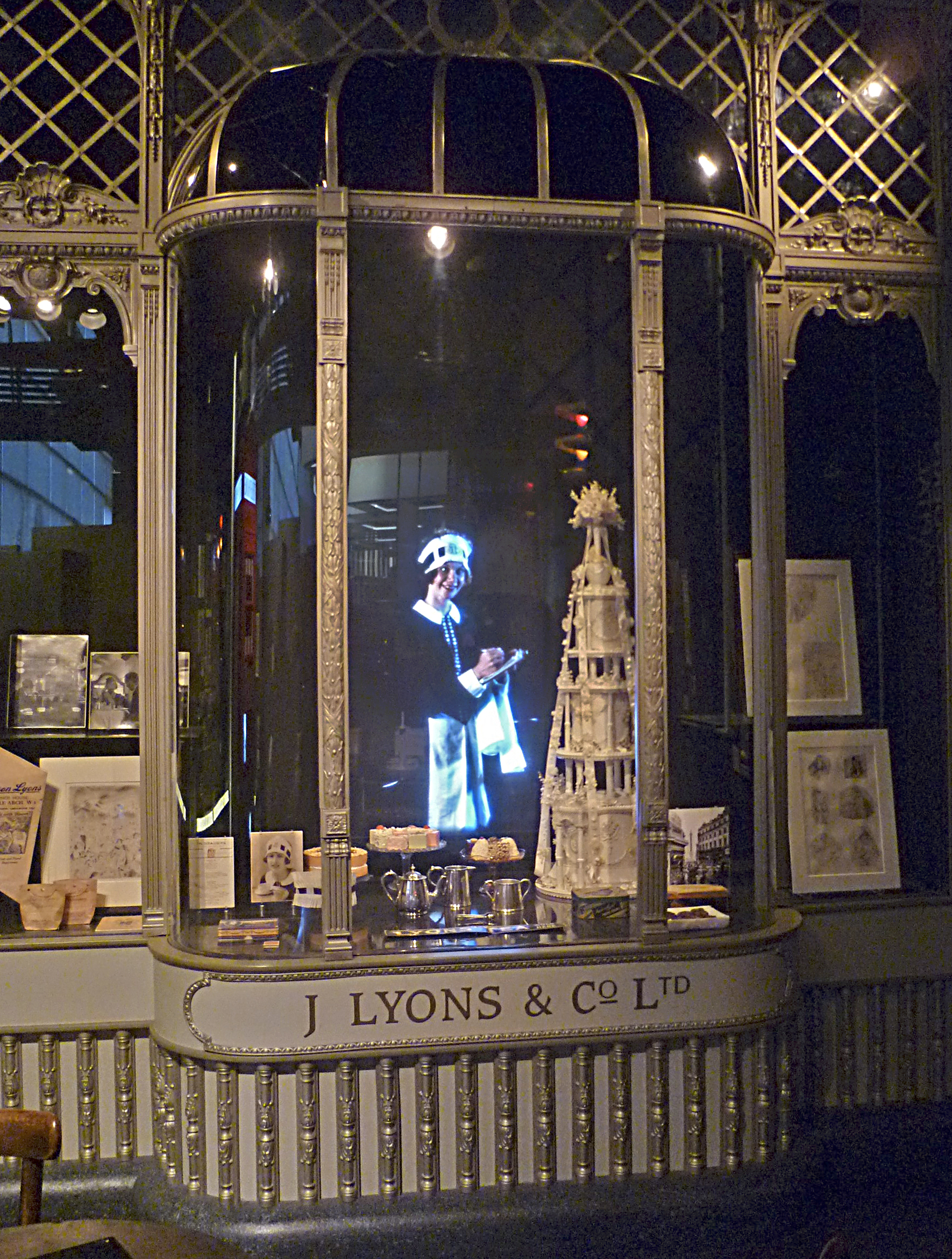
Lyons Corner House recreated in the Museum of London

The company was losing money in the 1960s but remained under the control of the Salmon family, descended from a founding partner. Lyons began to close some of its London tea shops and hotels; in 1963 it also merged its LEO Computers business with English Electric's computer interests to form the jointly owned English Electric LEO.

In 1964, Lyons sold their half-stake; and English Electric merged the company with Marconi's computer interests to form English Electric LEO Marconi Computers. A continuing problem in the British computer industry was both lack of investment capital and competition with the much larger U.S. computer companies, such as IBM. English Electric LEO Marconi Computers merged with other companies to form International Computers Limited (ICL) which was bought by Fujitsu in 1990.

In 1978, Lyons was acquired by Allied Breweries and became part of the resulting Allied Lyons. It fell on hard economic times in the late 1980s; and was sold, eventually being broken up with its ice cream and ice lolly products, which were branded as Lyons Maid, being sold to Nestlé. Other parts that were sold off included Lyons Cakes (sold to RHM and ending up as part of their Manor Bakeries subsidiary which also makes Mr Kipling's Cakes) and Ready Brek cereal (ending up being owned by Weetabix Limited). At the end of 1994, Lyons sold Lyons Biscuits to Hillsdown Holdings, which later sold it to a U.S. investment firm which subsequently sold it to British biscuit manufacturer Burton's Foods. Lyons' cake products, such as Bakewell tart and Battenberg, are owned by Premier Foods.

The J. Lyons & Co. papers are now stored in the London Metropolitan Archives. The niece and nephew of the Gluckstein brothers were Gluck, a painter; and Louis Gluckstein, a Conservative politician. A descendant of the Salmon side of the original partnership is Nigella Lawson.

== Advertising ==
On 31 December 1958, J. Lyons and Co broadcast a two-minute commercial on ITV whereby the company's chairman, Sir Isidore Gluckstein, addressed his customers, shareholders and staff to explain and illustrate the brand's aims of affordable prices, consistent high quality and service to the public. Advertising historian Henry James describes this as an "imaginative use of television" to end the year and an "enterprising use of the medium". Although the ad was greatly admired, the Independent Television Authority (ITA) were concerned that, if this technique developed, it could amount to an "invitation to invest" which was largely forbidden by television advertising principles, reminding them of Sir Bernard Docker buying advertising space to appeal for public support in his struggle for Daimler Company chairmanship in 1956. As a result, Sir Robert Fraser of the ITA declared that the only acceptable forms of advertising on ITV were those clearly intended to promote sales of the product or services in question, and that "[advertising] designed to influence public opinion during a takeover battle or a campaign against nationalization on behalf of private enterprise — however well disguised — would in future be disallowed."

In 1994, Lyons Original Coffee hired the advertising agency Duckworth Finn Grubb Waters (DFGW), who created an innovative UK television advert that aimed "to turn a commercial break into a coffee break." Employing an interactive "datablast" technique, the advert depicts scans of 30 pages from women's magazines, such as Cosmopolitan, Elle and Good Housekeeping, displayed at the rate of five frames a second, and the advert invites viewers to record the commercial on a VCR, play it back and then repeatedly pause it, one frame at a time, to read the pages while sat with a cup of Lyons coffee, with the advertisement providing "30 minutes of magazine 'reading' in 30 seconds." Considered groundbreaking, the advertisement premiered on Channel 4 on 7 November 1994, and was compared other nascent forms of interactive advertising from the same year, such as HHCL's commercials for the Mazda 323, one of which similarly invited viewers to record it and play it back and pause at specific moments, allowing to read otherwise momentary information about the car and a competition to win one.

== Notable employees ==
Former British Prime Minister Margaret Thatcher worked as a chemist for the company prior to becoming a barrister and then a Conservative Party MP. While working for the company she helped develop methods for preserving ice cream.

Peter Bird began work operating the LEO computer and rose to be a director of Lyons Computer Services. He later wrote a history of the company and its computers.

== In popular culture ==
The 2022 novel Case Study by Graeme Macrae Burnet, set in the 1960s, features a scene in which the main character enters a Lyons and is served by a Nippy.

== Leadership ==
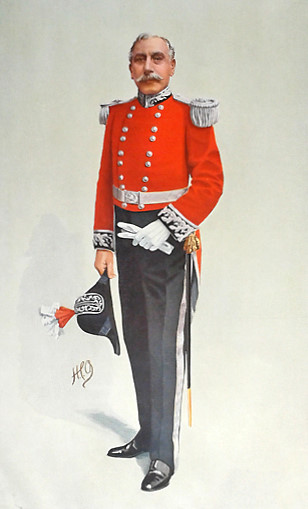
Caricature of co-founder Sir Joseph Lyons in Vanity Fair, 1910

The chairmen of J. Lyons were:

- 1894–1917 Sir Joseph Lyons
- 1917–1922 Montague Gluckstein
- 1923–1928 Alfred Salmon
- 1928–1941 Sir Isidore Salmon MP
- 1941–1950 Harry Salmon JP
- 1950–1956 Major Montague Isidore Gluckstein
- 1956–1960 Isidore Montague Gluckstein
- 1960–1965 Barnett Alfred Salmon
- 1965–1968 Sir Samuel Isidore Salmon JP (Mayor of Hammersmith 1968/69)
- 1968–1972 Geoffrey Salmon
- 1972–1977 Brian Lawson Salmon
- 1977–1981 Neil Lawson Salmon

== See also ==
- Horniman's Tea, once the largest tea company in the world, selling prepackaged tea, once owned by Lyons
- List of tea houses,
- J. Lyons and Co., Greenford
