= Irwin Cox =

British politician

(Irwin) Edward Bainbridge Cox, JP, DL, who used the pen-name I.E.B.C. (9 July 1838 – 27 August 1922) was a British Barrister, magazine proprietor and politician. He served as a Unionist Member of Parliament for Harrow at the beginning of the Twentieth Century.

== Early career ==
Cox was born in Taunton, Somerset, the son of Edward William Cox who was a Serjeant-at-law and who served as Member of Parliament for Taunton from 1868 to 1869. He attended Magdalene College, Cambridge where he read law; afterwards he studied for the Bar, and was called by the Middle Temple in 1864.

== Family connections ==
Initially, Cox assisted his father who ran the Law Times newspaper, and later took over the management of his father's properties (he was Lord of the Manor of Taunton, and owned about 2,000 acres). His father died in 1879 and he took over permanently, moving to the home he inherited at Moat Mount, Mill Hill, Middlesex. His wife, whom he married in 1865, was the daughter of the Vicar of Mill Hill.

== Recreations ==
Cox had many recreations, including angling (he owned a first edition of Izaak Walton's "The Compleat Angler") and shooting; at Moat Mount, he began to conserve game for shooting. Among those who visited to enjoy the sport was Sir Robert Baden-Powell. Developing the family newspaper business, Cox also became proprietor of The Field, and also edited the annual Angler's Diary under the initials "I.E.B.C.".

== Politics ==
When it was established in 1889, Cox was elected to Middlesex County Council as a Conservative, and became an Alderman in 1901. He enjoyed local government and was High Sheriff of the county for the year 1898 to 1899, also becoming a Deputy Lieutenant. Meanwhile, he was Chairman of the Petty Sessional Division of Gore from 1894. When the sitting Member of Parliament for Harrow, William Ambrose, was appointed a Judge, Cox was unanimously selected to follow him. Although standing as a Conservative, Cox pledged to vote against the Conservative government's Street Traffic Bill which regulated bus transport. Cox won the election despite an energetic challenge from the Liberal candidate.

== Parliament ==
Cox was a self-described "strong supporter of Mr. Balfour's government", and he also went along with Joseph Chamberlain's campaign for tariff reform. However, Cox did not entirely enjoy Parliamentary life; although re-elected at the 1900 general election, no speech by him in the House of Commons is recorded. He announced in 1904 his decision to stand down before the next election and his name rarely appears in Division Lists after then.

He went back to writing books on angling and shooting, and also hosted fox hunting. Cox died in 1922 at the age of 84.

== Works edited ==
- The Angler's Diary: or, Forms for Registering the Fish Taken During the Year; to which is Prefixed, a List of Fishing Stations in England - The Angler's Diary and Tourist Fisherman's Gazetteer (pub. 1866–1921)
- The Shooter's Diary: or, Forms for Registering Game Killed During the Year; to Which is Prefixed, a List of Some of the Principal Shooting Districts in the World (pub. Horace Cox, 1867–79)
- Facts and Useful Hints Relating to Fishing and Shooting: Being a Collection of Various Methods for Capturing Birds, Beasts, Vermin, and Fish; Together with a Great Variety of Recipes of all Kinds Useful to the Fisherman and Sportsman [The Field Library, Vol. I] (pub. Horace Cox, 1866)
- The Country House: A Collection of Useful Information and Recipes. Adapted to the Country Gentleman and his Household, and of the Greatest Utility to the Housekeeper Generally [The Field Library, Vol. II] (pub. Horace Cox, 1866)
- The Farm, Garden, Stable, and Aviary: to Which is Added some Useful Information Relating to the Poultry-Yard, Bee-Keeping, and Natural History [The Field Library, Vol. III] (pub. Horace Cox, 1866)

Parliament of the United Kingdom
Preceded by William Ambrose	Member of Parliament for Harrow; 1899–1906	Succeeded by James Gibb
