= Peter Bird (IT manager) =

British computer operator (1934–2017)

- Born: Peter John Bird; 1934; London, England
- Died: 16 August 2017 (aged 82)
- Occupations: Computer operator; Company director
- Employers: Merchant Navy; J. Lyons and Co. (1964 to 1991); Lyons Computer Services

Peter John Bird (1934–2017) was a British computer operator in the early days of commercial computing, and rose to be a director of Lyons Computer Services.

Bird was born in 1934 in north London, the second son of Eileen (née Darnell) and Jack Bird, a solicitors’ clerk. He served in the Merchant Navy, eventually becoming a first officer.

Bird worked for J. Lyons and Co. from 1964 to 1991, initially as an operator of the LEO III computer.

From the late 1980s, he developed an interest on the history of computing at Lyons, and thus in the history of the company in general. This led to him writing two books, one on each topic.

He also developed a secondary career, as a consultant on Lyons' history for television programmes, on some of which he appeared.

The LEO Computers Society's 2016 book 'LEO Remembered' is dedicated to him. In later years, he lived in Wokingham.

He died on 16 August 2017, aged 82.

== Bibliography ==
- LEO: The First Business Computer. Hasler. 1994. ISBN 978-0952165101.
- The First Food Empire: A History of J Lyons & Co. Phillimore. 2000. ISBN 978-1860771323.
