= Isidore Montague Gluckstein =

British businessman (1890–1975)

Isidore Montague Gluckstein (2 November 1890 – 16 January 1975) was managing director, then chairman, then president of J. Lyons and Co., a restaurant chain, food manufacturing, and hotel conglomerate created in 1884 that dominated British mass-catering in the first half of the twentieth century.

Isidore Montague Gluckstein was the son of Montague Gluckstein, chairman of J. Lyons and Co. He was educated at St Paul's, followed by Sidney Sussex College, Cambridge, and was severely wounded in World War I.

He was managing director of J. Lyons and Co. from 1940–56, chairman from 1956-61, and president from 1961.
