= Isidore Gluckstein =

British businessman (1851–1920)

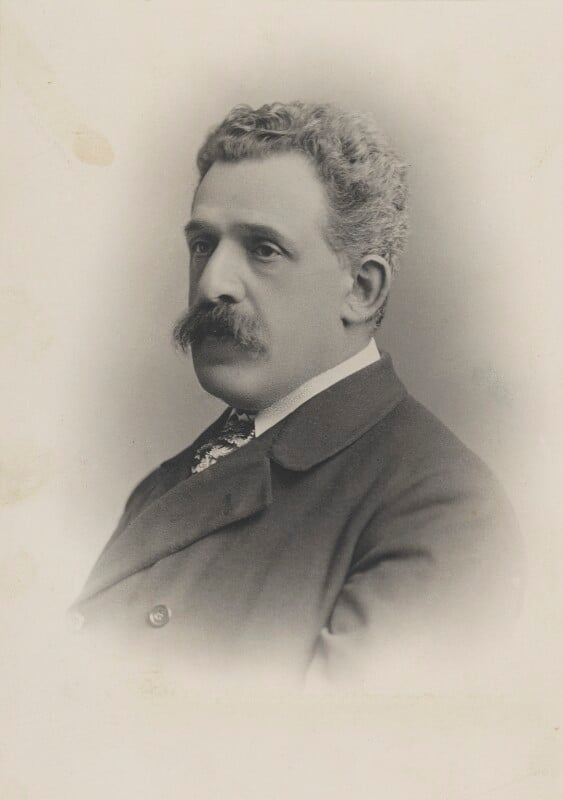
Gluckstein in the 1880s

Isidore Gluckstein (1851–1920) was a director of Salmon & Gluckstein tobacco merchants, and one of the founders of J. Lyons and Co., a restaurant chain, food manufacturing, and hotel conglomerate created in 1884 that dominated British mass-catering in the first half of the twentieth century.

Isidore Gluckstein was the son of Samuel Gluckstein, the founder of Salmon & Gluckstein.

He married Rose Cohen (1851–1908). Among their children were:

- Sir Samuel Gluckstein (1880–1958)
- Lena Gluckstein, who married Harry Salmon
- Major Montague Isidore Gluckstein OBE (1886–1958)
