= Samuel Gluckstein (1821–1873) =

Prussian-English tobacco merchant (1821–1873)

Samuel Henry Gluckstein (4 January 1821 – 23 January 1873) was the founder of Salmon & Gluckstein tobacco merchants.

== Early life ==
Samuel Henry Gluckstein was born in Rheinberg, Prussia (now Germany) on 4 January 1821, the son of Helena (Horn) and Asher Lehmann Gluckstein.

== Career ==
Samuel Gluckstein left Prussia to come to London, where he established a cigar-making factory in the East End.

== Personal life ==
Samuel Gluckstein married Hannah or Ann Joseph of Amsterdam, Netherlands (1819–1885), and they had twelve children, five sons and seven daughters:

- Julia (1846-1891)
- Lena (1846-1907)
- Bertha (1848-1921)
- Catherine (1850-1911)
- Isidore (1851-1920)
- Marcus (1853-1854)
- Montague (Monte) (1854-1922)
- Joseph (1856–1930), father of artist Gluck (1895-1978)
- Henry (1857–1914)
- Sarah (1859-1929)
- Adelaide (1861-1862)
- Clara (1863-1918)

He died on 23 January 1873 in Whitechapel, London.
