= Salmon & Gluckstein =

Former British tobacconist business

- Industry: Tobacco
- Founded: 1873
- Defunct: 1955
- Fate: Merged
- Successor: Imperial Tobacco
- Headquarters: Aldgate High St, London, United Kingdom
- Key people: Samuel Gluckstein, co-founder Barnett Salmon (1829–1897), co-founder Isidore Gluckstein; Sir Samuel Gluckstein
- Products: Cigarettes, cigars

Salmon & Gluckstein was a British tobacco business. Founded in London in 1873 by Samuel Gluckstein and Barnett Salmon (1829–1897), the firm pursued an aggressive expansion to become the largest tobacco sellers in the UK, with over 140 retail outlets. They claimed to be the largest tobacconist in the world.

== History ==
The Gluckstein and Salmon families grew to prominence in the second half of the nineteenth century through their involvement in the tobacco industry.

Beginning as small-time cigar manufacturers, by the turn of the century Salmon and Gluckstein Ltd was the world's largest retail tobacconist, having more than 160 shops by 1901. Salmon and Gluckstein Ltd was bought by Imperial Tobacco in 1902, and the brand remained in prominence until 1955.

The business was started in 1855 by Samuel Gluckstein who, having arrived in London in 1841 from Germany, began working in the tobacco industry. The first business operated from Crown Street, Soho, and by 1864, when the firm was incorporated, Samuel Gluckstein had been joined by Henry Gluckstein and Laurence Abrahams. By that date the business had moved to 43 Leman Street.

In 1870 a difference of opinion concerning the sharing of the profits resulted in the firm's dissolution. Henry Gluckstein and Laurence Abrahams went on to found Abrahams & Gluckstein, cigar manufacturers of 26 Whitechapel High Street, while Samuel Gluckstein formed a partnership with his two sons Isidore and Montague Gluckstein. They were also joined by Barnett Salmon, a tobacco salesman, who later married Samuel's daughter Helena. In 1873 Samuel Gluckstein died, leaving the business to his two sons and his son-in-law. In the same year, the company Salmon & Gluckstein Ltd. was established.

In order to avoid future family disputes the three men decided to form a family fund by pooling their resources. The principle of the venture was to encourage the strong to support the weak, with each member withdrawing what was required. As the number of members increased over the years, a more ordered system developed, but essentially this tightly-organised pooling arrangement formed the basis of the bulk of the family's business activities from the late nineteenth century onwards.

Until 1887 these business interests were centred on the firm of Salmon & Gluckstein, tobacco manufacturers and tobacconists. From 1887, however, Montague Gluckstein became interested in the idea of providing catering services for the large exhibitions which were sweeping Victorian Britain. Judging the business of catering to be beneath them, the family only gave their support to Montague on the understanding that the family name would not be used.Accordingly, Montague began searching for a suitable figurehead for his new venture, finding him in Joseph Lyons, a distant family relation. As a result the family company of J. Lyons and Co. was formed.

== Related readings ==
- Harding, Thomas (2019). Legacy: One Family, a Cup of Tea and the Company that Took On the World. William Heinemann.
