= Bywater =

Bywater may refer to:

- Bywater (surname), an uncommon British surname
- Bywater, New Orleans, a neighborhood of New Orleans, Louisiana, United States
- Bywater (Middle-earth), a village in J. R. R. Tolkien's Shire
- Bywater BASIC, a programming language
- Bywater (restaurant), a restaurant in Warren, Rhode Island
- The Bywater (restaurant), a restaurant in Los Gatos, California

== See also ==
- Bywaters, a surname
