= The Taste (German TV series) =

- Genre: Cooking
- Presented by: Christine Henning; Angelina Kirsch
- Judges: Frank Rosin; Alexander Herrmann; Léa Linster; Tim Mälzer; Cornelia Polletto; Roland Trettl; Maria Gross; Tim Raue; Alexander Kumptner
- Country of origin: Germany
- Original language: German
- No. of series: 6 (+3 Specials)
- No. of episodes: 45

Production
- Running time: 120–180 minutes
- Production company: Redseven Entertainment GmbH

Original release
- Network: Sat.1
- Release: 13 November 2013 – present

Related
- The Taste (U.S.)

The Taste is a German cooking game show series on Sat.1. It began airing on November 13, 2013.

== Judges and Host ==
Series	Judges/Coaches				Host
1	Frank Rosin	Alexander Herrmann	Léa Linster	Tim Mälzer	Christine Henning
2	Frank Rosin	Alexander Herrmann	Léa Linster	Tim Mälzer	Christine Henning
3	Frank Rosin	Alexander Herrmann	Cornelia Poletto	Tim Mälzer	Christine Henning
4	Frank Rosin	Alexander Herrmann	Cornelia Poletto	Roland Trettl	Christine Henning
5	Frank Rosin	Alexander Herrmann	Cornelia Poletto	Roland Trettl	Christine Henning
6	Frank Rosin	Alexander Herrmann	Cornelia Poletto	Roland Trettl	Christine Henning
7	Frank Rosin	Alexander Herrmann	Maria Gross	Tim Raue	Christine Henning
8	Frank Rosin	Alexander Herrmann	Alexander Kumptner	Tim Raue	Angelina Kirsch
9	Frank Rosin	Alexander Herrmann	Alexander Kumptner	Tim Raue	Angelina Kirsch

== Season summary ==
Colour key

Team Alexander H.
Team Frank
Team Léa
Team Tim M.
Team Cornelia
Team Roland
Team Maria
Team Tim R.
Team Alexander K.

Season	Premiere	Finale	Winner	Runner-up	Other finalist(s)		Winning coach	Presenters	Coaches (order)			
Season	Premiere	Finale	Winner	Runner-up	Other finalist(s)		Winning coach	Presenters	1	2	3	4
1	November 13, 2013	December 18, 2013	Felicitas	Dennis	Gabriel	Christa	Tim Mälzer	Christine Henning	Tim M.	Léa	Alexander H.	Frank
2	October 8, 2014	November 19, 2014	Jan	Ole	Timo	Rosina	Alexander Herrmann	Christine Henning	Tim M.	Léa	Alexander H.	Frank
3	September 2, 2015	October 14, 2015	Kristof	Tobias	Helena	Jan Thorben	Tim Mälzer	Christine Henning	Tim M.	Cornelia	Alexander H.	Frank
4	October 12, 2016	November 23, 2016	Marco	Frank	Jörg	Boris	Alexander Herrmann	Christine Henning	Frank	Cornelia	Roland	Alexander H.
5	October 11, 2017	December 6, 2017	Lisa	Joel	Christian	Hansjörg	Alexander Herrmann	Christine Henning	Frank	Cornelia	Roland	Alexander H.
6	October 10, 2018	December 5, 2018	Gary	Semi	Christoph	Melanie	Roland Trettl	Christine Henning	Frank	Alexander H.	Cornelia	Roland
7	October 2, 2019	November 27, 2019	Marko	Susanne	Michi	Tobias	Alexander Herrmann	Christine Henning	Frank	Tim R.	Maria	Alexander H.
8	September 2, 2020	October 28, 2020	Lars	Yvonne	Yassin	Jan	Alexander Kumptner	Angelina Kirsch	Frank	Alexander K.	Tim R.	Alexander H.
9	September 1, 2021	October 27, 2021	Upcoming season					Angelina Kirsch	Frank	Alexander K.	Tim R.	Alexander H.

== Special ==
=== Celebrity Special ===
==== Season 1 ====
The first season of The Taste: Celebrity Special began airing on September 10, 2017 and the coaches were, as in the fourth season Alexander Herrmann, Frank Rosin, Cornelia Polletto and Roland Trettl. The host was Christine Henning. The season was won by singer Patrick Lindner.

==== Season 2 ====
The second celebrity special was aired on September 17, 2017, with the same concept, same coaches, and same name as the first celebrity special. The winner was Evi Sachenbacher-Stehle.

=== Christmas Special ===
On December 12, 2018, one week after the sixth season finale, a Christmas special was aired. As in the previous seasons, the coaches were Alexander Herrmann, Frank Rosin, Cornelia Poletto and Roland Trettl . Each coach selected two candidates from his past teams.
