= The Taste =

2013 American cooking TV series

- Genre: Reality competition
- Directed by: Brian Smith
- Judges: Anthony Bourdain; Nigella Lawson; Ludo Lefebvre; Brian Malarkey (season 1); Marcus Samuelsson (seasons 2–3)
- Country of origin: United States
- Original language: English
- No. of seasons: 3
- No. of episodes: 23

Production
- Executive producers: Anthony Bourdain; Chris Coelen; Emma Conway; Matilda Zoltowski; Nigella Lawson
- Running time: 42-43 minutes (season 1); 84-86 minutes (season 2, 3 and 1 premiere)
- Production company: Kinetic Content

Original release
- Network: ABC
- Release: January 22, 2013 – January 22, 2015

The Taste is an American cooking-themed reality competition series on ABC. It aired from January 22, 2013, to January 22, 2015. On May 7, 2015, ABC canceled The Taste after three seasons.

== Format ==
The Taste season begins with blind auditions of both professional and amateur cooks during which four judges, who double as mentors, taste one spoonful of food from each contestant without knowing who cooked it or what all the ingredients were. Each judge decides whether or not they would like the contestant on his or her team by pressing a button, green for yes or red for no. The buttons are hidden from the other judges, although some decisions are revealed to the home audience.

The four then meet the contestant and press a button to reveal their votes. If exactly one judge votes yes, that contestant automatically joins that judge's four-member team. If more than one judge votes yes, the contestant chooses among them.

Once the 16 contestants are chosen, each episode consists of team and individual challenges on a weekly theme.

In the team challenge, the contestants work for one hour with coaching from their mentors. Each mentor selects one dish to represent his or her team, which is tasted by a guest judge. The team with the best taste is rewarded with a private session with the guest judge, while the mentor of team who places last in the challenge must eliminate one of their contestants.

In the individual challenge, the contestants work without assistance for one hour. Each episode ends with the mentors tasting all the competitors' dishes without knowing what it is, how it was prepared, who created it, or whom they will be eliminating, awarding a gold star to the dish they liked the most and a red star to the dish they liked the least. The contestant or contestants with the worst bite of food is eliminated from the competition in the first two seasons.

Starting in the third season, the two contestants who receive the highest number of red stars in the individual challenge compete in a 40 minute, sudden-death taste-off. The mentors are not allowed to touch the contestants' food in this challenge. The competitor who has the best bite of food in the taste-off advances to the next stage of the competition, while the other competitor is eliminated.

Other aspects of the team and individual challenges vary by season. See season breakdowns for details.

== Judges ==
The judges/mentors are Anthony Bourdain, Nigella Lawson, Ludo Lefebvre, and Marcus Samuelsson. Brian Malarkey served on the panel for the first season. Bourdain and Lawson also serve as executive producers.

Michelin Guide chef David Kinch was a guest judge on episode 4 of season one, titled "Daring Pairings". Chef José Andrés was a guest judge on the season one finale, "The Taste Finale: Triple Threat".

== Episodes ==
Season	Episodes	Season premiere	Season finale
1	8	January 22, 2013	March 12, 2013
2	8	January 2, 2014	February 20, 2014
3	7	December 4, 2014	January 22, 2015

== Season 1 (2013) ==
=== Format ===
In the team challenge, the creator of the best dish receives immunity from elimination for that episode.

In the individual challenge, the creators of the worst two, sometimes three dishes are eliminated from the competition.

=== Finalists ===
Cooks are organized into four "Kitchen" groups, each with a mentor.

Mentors	Cooks			
Anthony Bourdain	Ninamarie Bojekian; 28, Caterer; Franklin Lakes, NJ	Diane DiMeo; 45, Chef Consultant; Astoria, NY	Uno Immanivong; 35, Mortgage Consultant; Dallas, TX	Mia Morgenstern; 26, Yoga Instructor; San Francisco, CA
Nigella Lawson	Renatta Lindsey; 32, Program Monitor; Houston, TX	Huda Mu'min; 31, Caterer; Washington, DC	Lauren Scott; 23, Administrative Assistant; Laurel, MS	Erika Monroe Williams; 42, Broadcaster; Paradise Valley, AZ
Ludo Lefebvre	Paul Caravelli; 31, Executive Chef; Libertyville, IL	Shawn Davis; 43, Executive Chef; Los Angeles, CA	Gregg Drusinsky; 31, Culinary Instructor; New York, NY	Sarah Schiear; 27, Food Blogger; Fort Lauderdale, FL
Brian Malarkey	Micah Kasman; 31, Design Director; San Francisco, CA	Jeff Mahin; 28, Executive Chef; Marina Del Rey, CA	Adam Pechal; 36, Executive Chef; Sacramento, CA	Khristianne Uy; 30, Private Chef; West Hollywood, CA

=== Contestant progress ===
Team
A Anthony's Kitchen N Nigella's Kitchen L Ludo's Kitchen M Malarkey's Kitchen

Cooks		3	4	5	6	7	8	Episode
Team Taste Winner		Lauren	Gregg	Gregg	Gregg	Sarah	Diane; Khristianne; Sarah	
M	Khristianne	HIGH	HIGH	IN	HIGH	HIGH	WINNER	The Taste Finale: Triple Threat
A	Diane	HIGH	IN	LOW	IN	LOW	RUNNER-UP	The Taste Finale: Triple Threat
L	Sarah	HIGH	LOW	IN	IN	IN	RUNNER-UP	The Taste Finale: Triple Threat
L	Gregg	IN	IN	LOW	LOW	IN	OUT	The Taste Finale: Triple Threat
M	Jeff	IN	IN	HIGH	HIGH	OUT		Seduction
N	Lauren	LOW	IN	HIGH	LOW	OUT		Seduction
L	Paul	IN	IN	IN	IN	OUT		Seduction
A	Uno	IN	IN	IN	OUT			Nose to Tail
A	Ninamarie	IN	HIGH	HIGH	OUT			Nose to Tail
M	Adam	IN	IN	IN	OUT			Nose to Tail
A	Mia	IN	IN	OUT				The Art of the Sandwich
N	Huda	IN	LOW	OUT				The Art of the Sandwich
L	Shawn	LOW	OUT					Daring Pairings
N	Erika	IN	OUT					Daring Pairings
N	Renatta	OUT						Comfort Food
M	Micah	OUT						Comfort Food

The cook won The Taste.
The cook was one of the favorites.
The cook was one of the least favorites, but was not eliminated.
The cook was eliminated.

=== Episodes ===
No. overall	No. in season	Title	Original release date	U.S. viewers (millions)
1	1	"Auditions: Part 1"	January 22, 2013	5.82
Professional chefs and home cooks compete for one of the sixteen spots in a celebrity chef's kitchen. To be continued...
2	2	"Auditions: Part 2"	January 29, 2013	4.80
The second half of the auditions commence, as more hopefuls compete for a spot on a team.
3	3	"Comfort Food"	February 5, 2013	5.34
The contestants are challenged to create "comfort" dishes. Lauren of Team Nigella wins the first team challenge, giving her team an advantage during the individual task. Lauren, Micah, Renatta, and Shawn find themselves in the bottom four, as the four judges have given them all one red star, declaring them as the creators of the four worst dishes of the round. Khristianne and Sarah both receive one gold star, meaning that they created one of the judges' favorite dishes, while Diane receives two gold stars. Lauren is automatically safe, as she had won immunity for herself by winning the team challenger earlier. Shawn is spared and Micah and Renatta are the first cooks sent home.
4	4	"Daring Pairings"	February 12, 2013	4.58
The contestants are challenged to create any dish they want and pair it with a wine of their choice. Gregg wins the team challenge for Team Ludo. Erica, Huda, Sarah, and Shawn each receive a red star after the individual taste tests. Meanwhile, Khristianne and Ninamarie each receive two gold stars. The judges choose to keep Huda and Sarah in the competition, eliminating Erica and Shawn.
5	5	"The Art of the Sandwich"	February 19, 2013	4.76
The contestants have to create unique sandwiches. Gregg wins the team challenge for the second time for Team Ludo. The judges are not impressed with his second dish, however, and he is placed into the bottom four with Diane, Mia, and Huda. Jeff receives two gold stars, while Lauren and Ninamarie each receive one. Gregg is declared safe, as he held immunity. Mia defends her sandwich, as she thought it was unfair of the judges to criticize her homemade bread, as most of the other contestants didn't bother to make theirs from scratch. Ultimately, the judges decide to send Mia home, along with Huda.
6	6	"Nose to Tail"	February 26, 2013	4.11
The contestants must create dishes using unusual edible body parts of an animal, such as cow tongues and sweetbread. Gregg of Team Ludo wins the team challenge for the third straight week in a row. During the prep period for the individual tastings, Gregg slices his finger. The judges select Adam, Gregg, Lauren, Ninamarie, and Uno. Uno became the first person in the competition to receive both a gold star and a red star, meaning that she wasn't safe. Jeff received one star and Khristianne received two gold stars. Gregg is declared safe due to getting immunity. Adam is the first one sent home, followed by Ninamarie. The judges have a hard time choosing between Uno, who had been consistent up until this challenge, and Lauren, who has been unpredictable. Nigella's rallying works, as her last team member is spared from elimination and Uno is sent home.
7	7	"Seduction"	March 5, 2013	3.19
The contestants must create "sexy," seductive dishes. Sarah wins the team challenge for Team Ludo and instead of being offered immunity this week, she received a cookware set similar to the ones used in the show's kitchens. For the individual tastings, each cook must pair their dishes with a fine beverage. Diane, Jeff, Lauren, and Paul are in the bottom four, with three of them going home. Jeff receives both a red and a gold star. Khristianne receives a record three stars for her dish. Lauren, Jeff, and Paul are all eliminated. Diane, Gregg, Khristianne, and Sarah move onto the Season 1 finals.
8	8	"The Taste Finale: Triple Threat"	March 12, 2013	3.36
The last four remaining contestants (Diane, Gregg, Khristianne, and Sarah) have a team challenge to make tapas using mozzarella cheese, Iberico ham and spot prawns for Spanish chef José Andrés. One contestant is to be eliminated after Andrés does the judging. The mentors help their team to try to ensure their placement in the final three. Andrés eliminates Gregg from the competition, leaving Diane, Khristianne, and Sarah as the top three. The last three make their final dishes for the show, and Andrés serves as a mentor for them. In the end, Khristianne is declared the winner of The Taste.

== Season 2 (2014) ==
=== Format ===
In the team challenge, the mentor of the team which created the worst dish must eliminate a member of his team.

In the individual challenge, the contestant who created the worst dish is eliminated.

=== Finalists ===
Cooks are organized into four "Kitchen" groups, each with a mentor.

Mentors	Cooks			
Anthony Bourdain	Brad Martin; 44, Executive Chef; Moreno Valley, CA; Episode 6 (Team)	Shellie Kitchen; 41, Food Truck Owner; San Francisco, CA; Episode 6 (Individual)	Lee Knoeppel; 27, Waiter; Brooklyn, NY; Finale	Dana Micek; 39, Private Chef; Chicago, IL; Episode 5 (Individual)
Nigella Lawson	Reina Bazzi; 53, Translator; Miami, FL; Episode 2 (Team)	Crystal Powell; 51, Real Estate Agent; Chicago, IL; Episode 4 (Team)	Jay Qualls; 45, Wedding Cake Designer; Murfreesboro, TN; Episode 2 (Individual)	Jacquelyn Sowards; 36, Private Chef/Caterer; Sherman Oaks, CA; Episode 5 (Withdrew/Team)
Ludo Lefebvre	Jeff Kawakami; 32, Caterer; Hollywood, CA; Finale (Team)	Cassandra Bodzak; 26, Happy Healthy Living Guru; New York, NY; Episode 4 (Individual)	Louise Leonard; 39, Food Stylist; Los Angeles, CA (Winner)	Marina Chung; 53, Homemaker; Duarte, CA; Finale
Marcus Samuelsson	Don Pullum; 56, Wine Maker; Mason, TX; Episode 3 (Individual)	Sarah Master; 35, Executive Chef; Minneapolis, MN; Episode 7 (Individual)	Audrey Johns; 33, Food Blogger; Atascadero, CA; Episode 3 (Team)	Shehu Fitzgerald; 39, Chef; Staten Island, NY; Episode 7 (Team)

=== Contestant progress ===
Team
A Anthony's Kitchen N Nigella's Kitchen L Ludo's Kitchen M Marcus' Kitchen

Cooks		2	3	4	5	6	7	8	Episode
Team Taste Winner		L Jeff	L Jeff	A Shellie	L Louise	M Sarah	L Marina	L Marina	
L	Louise	IN	IN	IN	IN★★	IN★	IN	WINNER	The Finale
L	Marina	IN	IN★	IN★★	IN	IN★★	IN★	RUNNER-UP	The Finale
A	Lee	IN ★★	IN ★★	IN	IN ★	IN	IN★★★	OUT	The Finale
L	Jeff	IN★★	IN★	IN	IN★★	IN★	IN★★★	OUT	The Finale (Team)
M	Sarah	IN	IN	IN★★	IN★	IN★	OUT★		Good With Beer (Individual)
M	Shehu	IN	IN★	IN★★★	IN	IN	OUT		Good With Beer (Team)
A	Shellie	IN	IN	IN	IN	OUT★★★			The Sweetest Thing (Individual)
A	Brad	IN	IN	IN	IN	OUT			The Sweetest Thing (Team)
A	Dana	IN	IN★	IN	OUT ★★				Go Green (Individual)
N	Jacquelyn	IN	IN	IN	QUIT^{1}				Go Green (Team)
L	Cassandra	IN	IN	OUT★					Street Food (Individual)
N	Crystal	IN	IN	OUT					Street Food (Team)
M	Don	IN	OUT★★						Guilty Pleasures (Individual)
M	Audrey	IN★	OUT						Guilty Pleasures (Team)
N	Jay	OUT★★★							My Life on a Plate (Individual)
N	Reina	OUT							My Life on a Plate (Team)

The cook won The Taste.
The cook quit the competition.
The cook was eliminated in the individual challenge.
The cook was eliminated in the team challenge.
★ The cook received the indicated number of gold stars.
★ The cook received the indicated number of red stars.

1. Because Jacquelyn quit during the judging of the team challenge, Marcus was not required to eliminate a member of his team even though his team lost the challenge.

=== Episodes ===
No. overall	No. in season	Title	Original release date	U.S. viewers (millions)
9	1	"The Auditions"	January 2, 2014	4.75
10	2	"My Life On A Plate"	January 9, 2014	4.47
guest judge Edward Lee (chef)
11	3	"Guilty Pleasures"	January 16, 2014	3.27
guest judge Aarón Sánchez
12	4	"Street Food"	January 23, 2014	4.02
guest judge Roy Choi
13	5	"Go Green"	January 30, 2014	3.63
guest judge Yotam Ottolenghi
14	6	"The Sweetest Thing"	February 6, 2014	3.17
guest judge Christina Tosi
15	7	"Good with Beer"	February 13, 2014	3.05
guest judge Jonathan Waxman
16	8	"The Finale"	February 20, 2014	3.20
guest judge Jacques Pépin

== Season 3 (2014–15) ==
Season 3 of The Taste premiered on December 4, 2014 with Ludo, Nigella, Marcus, and Anthony as the judges. The first episode received 3.33 million viewers.

=== Contestants ===
Mentors	Cooks			
Anthony Bourdain	Tarik Abdullah; 41, DJ/Pop-Up Chef; Seattle, WA; Eliminated in Episode 6	Eric LeBlanc; 28, Chef; Boston, MA	Vanessa Lauren; 29, Private Chef; Los Angeles, CA; Eliminated in Episode 6	Tom Ramsey; 49, Restaurant Owner; Jackson, MS; Eliminated in Episode 5
Nigella Lawson	Renee Maynard; 33, Stay-at-Home Mom; Seattle, WA; Eliminated in Episode 1	Lindsey Becker; 28, Private Chef; New York, NY; Eliminated in Episode 2	P.K. Newby; 44, Nutrition Scientist; Boston, MA; Eliminated in Episode 4	Mia Chiarella; 26, Executive Chef; Wildwood, NJ; Eliminated in Episode 3
Ludo Lefebvre	Dan Brelsford; 22, Firefighter; Bridgeport, CT; Eliminated in Episode 5	Jen Royle; 39, Sports Reporter; Boston, MA	Natasha Bernardez; 35, Chef/Caterer; New York, NY; Eliminated in Episode 4	Benjamin Burke; 27, Sous Chef; Denver, CO
Marcus Samuelsson	Gabe Kennedy; 23, Private Chef; Brooklyn, NY	Joe Arvin; 43, Corporate Chef; Schererville, IN; Eliminated in Episode 3	Jake Gilber; 20, Sous Chef; Austin, TX; Eliminated in Episode 2	Tristen Epps; 26, Hotel Chef; Houston, TX

Renee Maynard was a contestant on season 18 of The Bachelor, and Joe Arvin was a contestant on season 14 of Big Brother.

=== Contestant progress ===
Team
A Anthony's Kitchen N Nigella's Kitchen L Ludo's Kitchen M Marcus' Kitchen

Cooks		1	2	3	4	5	6	7 (Top 4)	7 (Top 3)	Episode
Team Taste Winner		M Tristen	M Gabe	L Dan	A Eric	M Gabe	M Tristen	M Gabe		
M	Gabe	SAFE	SAFE ★	SAFE ★	SAFE ★★	SAFE ★★	SAFE ★	SAFE ★★	WINNER	
L	Benjamin	SAFE	SAFE	SAFE	SAFE ★	SAFE	SAFE ★★	BOTTOM	RUNNER-UP	
M	Tristen	SAFE	SAFE	SAFE	SAFE	SAFE ★★	SAFE ★	SAFE ★★	OUT	
A	Eric	SAFE	SAFE	SAFE	SAFE	BOTTOM ★	BOTTOM ★★	OUT		Surf and Turf (Individual)
L	Jen	SAFE	BOTTOM ★	BOTTOM ★★	SAFE ★	SAFE	SAFE ★	OUT		Saints and Sinners (Team)
A	Vanessa	SAFE	SAFE	SAFE	SAFE	SAFE ★	OUT ★			Bring the Heat (Individual)
A	Tarik	SAFE	SAFE	SAFE ★	BOTTOM ★	SAFE	OUT			Bring The Heat (Team)
A	Tom	SAFE	SAFE	SAFE ★★	SAFE	OUT ★★				Latin (Individual)
L	Dan	SAFE	SAFE	SAFE ★	SAFE ★★	OUT				Latin (Team)
L	Natasha	SAFE	SAFE ★★★	SAFE	OUT ★					Happy New Year (Individual)
N	P.K.	SAFE	SAFE	SAFE	OUT					Happy New Year (Team)
M	Joe	SAFE	SAFE ★	OUT ★						Happy Holidays (Individual)
N	Mia	SAFE	SAFE ★	OUT						Happy Holidays (Team)
M	Jake	SAFE	OUT ★							Under the Sea (Individual)
N	Lindsey	SAFE	OUT							Under the Sea (Team)
N	Renee	OUT								Childhood (Team)

The contestant won the taste-off and was saved from elimination.
The contestant lost the taste-off and was eliminated.
The contestant was eliminated in the team challenge.

=== Episodes ===
No. overall	No. in season	Title	Original release date	U.S. viewers (millions)
17	1	"Auditions and Childhood"	December 4, 2014	3.33
Chefs audition for a chance to compete, and sixteen are selected. In the team challenge, guest judge Stephanie Izard critiques the judges' selections based on the theme of Childhood. She selects Tristen's dish as the best, with Mia's as the worst. Therefore, Nigella has to eliminate one contestant from her team, and she selects Renee.
18	2	"Under the Sea"	December 11, 2014	3.17
In the team challenge, guest judge Eric Ripert selected the best seafood dish from the teams. He selected Gabe's as the best dish, and P.K.'s as the worst. Nigella, having lost the challenge, selected Lindsey to be eliminated. Jen and Jake were chosen for the Taste-Off over Natasha and Mia. Anthony, Nigella, and Eric Ripert chose Jake's dish as the worst, causing him to be eliminated.
19	3	"Happy Holidays"	December 18, 2014	3.12
In the team challenge, guest judge Naomi Pomeroy selected the best holiday dish. Anthony, Ludo, and Marcus chose fowl for their dishes, while Nigella selected gingerbread. Ultimately, Pomeroy chose Dan's dish as the best, and Mia's as the worst. Nigella subsequently eliminated Mia, leaving her with only one contestant, P.K. In the Taste-Off, Jen squared off against Joe, with Joe being selected for elimination by Anthony, Nigella, and Pomeroy.
20	4	"Happy New Year!"	January 1, 2015	2.69
In the team challenge, guest judge Michael Symon judged dishes based on New Year's. He selected Eric's dish as the best, and P.K.'s dish as the worst. Since P.K. was Nigella's last remaining contestant, she was eliminated. Tarik and Natasha were sent to the Taste-Off over Dan, and Natasha was eliminated by Nigella, Marcus, and Symon.
21	5	"Latin"	January 8, 2015	3.22
In the team challenge, guest judge Javier Plascencia judged the best Latin-flavored dish. He selected Gabe's dish as the best, and Ben's as the worst. Ludo eliminated Dan after he volunteered for elimination. Eric and Tom were selected for the Taste-Off over Vanessa, and Tom was eliminated by Nigella, Marcus, Ludo, and Plascencia.
22	6	"Bring the Heat"	January 15, 2015	3.28
Guest judge: Andy Ricker
23	7	"The Finale"	January 22, 2015	3.03
Guest judge: Jonathan Waxman

== International versions ==
The international rights are distributed by Red Arrow International.

Countries/regions	Title	Host	Network	Top prize	Mentors	Premiere
Arab League	The Taste	?	OSN Yahala HD; Al-Nahar TV	?	(Egypt) Alaa Sharbini (Syria) Aniseh Helou (Lebanon) Betni Kaadi (Saudi Arabia) Mona Mousily	December 26, 2014
Brazil	The Taste Brasil	none	GNT	R$100,000	Claude Troisgros (1-); Felipe Bronze (1-); André Mifano (1-5); Helena Rizzo (3-5); Manu Buffara (6-); Manu Ferraz (6-)	2014
China	味觉大战	?	CCTV-2	?	Sun Zhaoguo; Bowie Tsang; Craig Auyeung	November 2013
Colombia	La Prueba	Guillermo Vives	Caracol Televisión	CO$300,000,000	Catalina Vélez; Leonor Espinosa; Juan Manuel Barrientos	November 26, 2014
Germany	The Taste	Christine Henning (1–7); Angelina Kirsch (8–)	Sat.1	€100,000	Frank Rosin (1–); Alexander Herrmann (1–); Léa Linster (1–2); Tim Mälzer (1–3); Cornelia Polletto (3–6); Roland Trettl (4–6); Maria Gross (7); Tim Raue (7–); Alexander Kumptner (8–)	November 13, 2013
Germany	The Taste: Celebrity Special	Christine Henning	Sat.1	?	Frank Rosin; Alexander Herrmann; Cornelia Polletto; Roland Trettl	September 10, 2017
Germany	The Taste: Christmas Special	Christine Henning	Sat.1	?	Frank Rosin; Alexander Herrmann; Cornelia Polletto; Roland Trettl	December 12, 2018
Lithuania	Skonis	Andrius Butkus	LNK	10,000 Lt	Liutauras Čeprackas; Romas Zakarevičius; Agnė Jagelavičiūtė; Kristina Brazauskienė	October 13, 2013
Netherlands; Belgium (Flanders)	The Taste	?	RTL4; VTM	?	Robert Kranenborg; Wout Bru; Herman den Blijker; Gert de Mangeleer	October 29, 2013
United Kingdom	The Taste	none	Channel 4	?	Anthony Bourdain; Nigella Lawson; Ludo Lefebvre	January 7, 2014

Other versions of this program has been aired in Canada (CTV Television Network), Australia (Nine Network) and Indonesia (IBC).
