= Live Earth concert, Rome =

Concert event

Live Earth
- Dates: July 7, 2007
- Locations: Basilica of St. John Lateran, Rome
- Years active: 2007
- Founders: Al Gore, Kevin Wall
- Website: Live Earth Site

The Heptavium concert, representing also the Live Earth concert in Rome, took place on 7 July 2007 at the Basilica of St. John Lateran, the Cathedral of Rome and subject to the extraterritorial jurisdiction of the Holy See. It was part of a series of high-profile concerts organised by Kevin Wall, which took place across the globe to raise awareness about climate change. Jonas Lauren Norr of Ethos Investments was responsible for the collaboration of Live Earth with the Heptavium concert as a producer of the event. The concert was masterminded and written by composer and researcher of philosophy Michael I.D'Alessandra. The concert was officially backed by the Vatican, thus being the Catholic Church's autonomous presence at the Live Earth events.

== Heptavium/Live Earth: The Concert ==
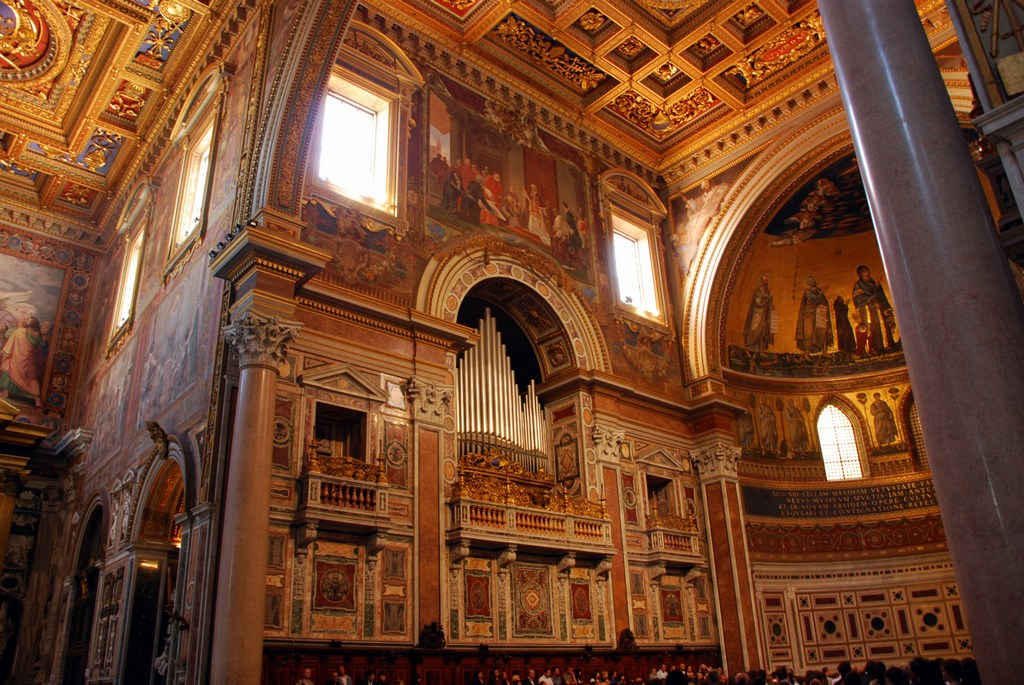
St. John Lateran's pipe organ

The Heptavium/Live Earth event was inaugurated by Paul Cardinal Poupard, who explained the scope and meaning of the evening, a prelude to the Cathedralia Project, an endeavour of original sacred music between Rome and the USA, conceived and composed by D'Alessandra and planned for the next decade. A reading of a page from St. Augustine's "City of God" followed, mentioning the sacred aspect of earthly nature, concluded by an intervention on behalf of the Live Earth event by acclaimed film producer Lawrence Bender.

The concert was performed exclusively in two different locations of the Cathedral of Rome: before its Holy Door, and inside the Cathedral, in the central nave. During the first part of the concert, various works for string quartet and grand piano composed by M° Michael D'Alessandra were performed by the Bernini Quartet, a string ensemble of virtuosos from Rome, and D'Alessandra, a piano virtuoso and organist himself; the performance was shown inside the Church through HD screens placed aside the Church's canopy.

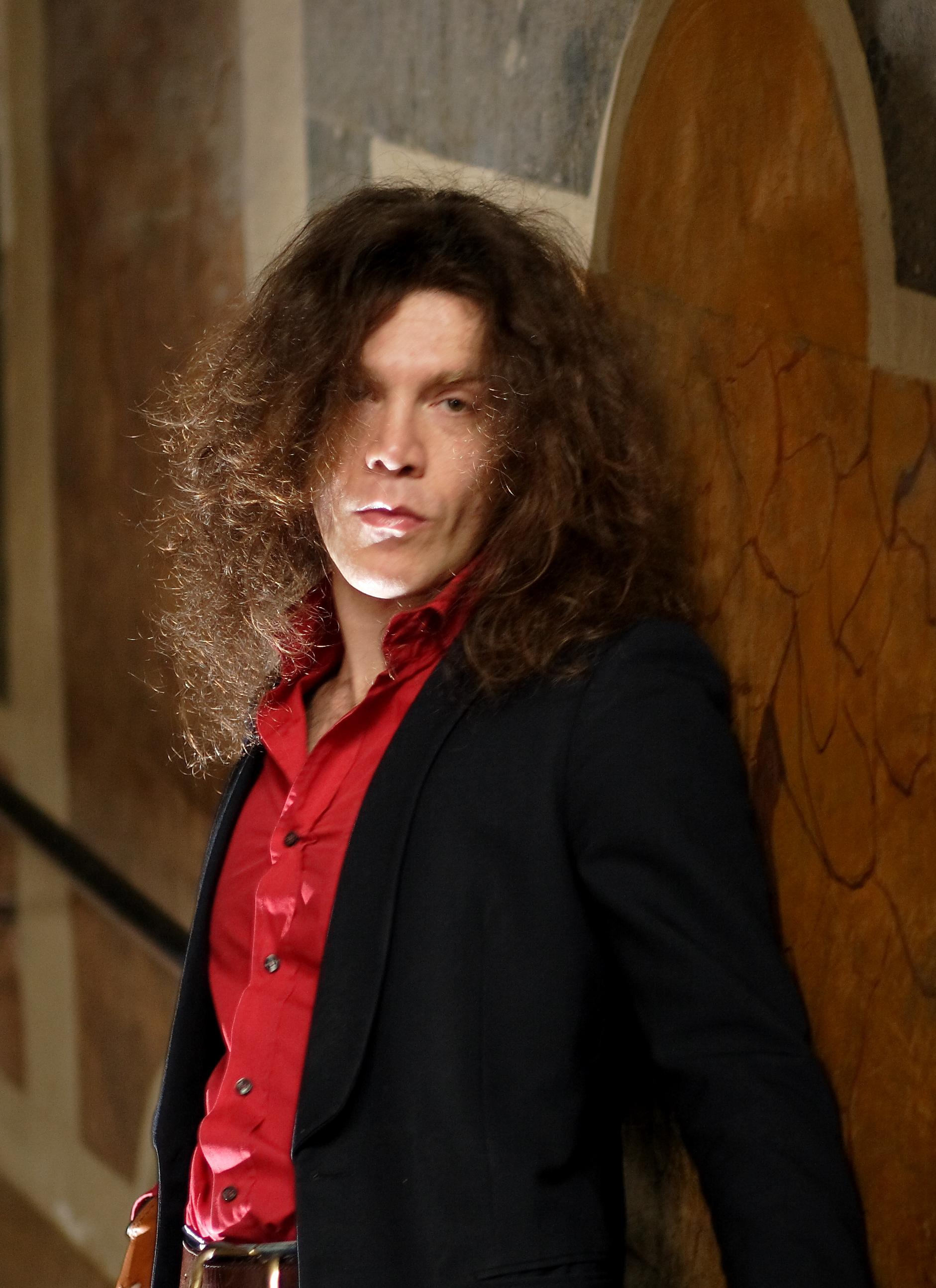
M° Michael D'Alessandra

The second part of the concert, consisting of symphonic and choral sacred music, saw the deployment of the largest orchestra the Church had ever experienced. Performing were the London Oratory School Schola, Michael D'Alessandra, The Rome Philharmonic Orchestra and M°Cristiano Serino. The choir and orchestra performed Vexilla Regis, a variation on Franz Liszt's Via Crucis conducted by Michael D'Alessandra, connected to Septem postrema verba, a concerto for choir, orchestra and cello solo written by M°Cristiano Serino conducting it. The last seven words of Jesus Christ on the cross were utilised for the libretto, culminating towards the core of the concert: D'Alessandra's Missa Sylvestri II, a funeral Mass, beginning with an eerie Kyrie Eleison progressing to a fast-paced Sanctus, through a solemn Benedictus, reminiscent of German baroque progressions and Russian Orthodox melodies, and concluding with an elegiac Agnus Dei. This funeral Mass, regarded as a masterpiece of new sacred music in Vatican cultural circles, was written for the 1000th anniversary of Pope Sylvester II's death (May 12, 1003) and premiered in the year 2003 in the very Cathedral of Rome, where Sylvester II is buried. The last performance, Gloria, a piece endowed with Wagnerian traits uttered a finale in which, D'Alessandra conducting, 140 musicians and singers reached the acme of their performance.

This ceremonial concert coincided with the issuance of the motu proprio, Summorum Pontificum relating to the traditional Latin Mass, also on 7 July 2007.

== Heptavium/Live Earth in the media ==
The concert was broadcast either in full or in part by many television and radio networks. The concert was broadcast in Italy, America, Australia and New Zealand, and a short clip showing D'Alessandra's funeral Kyrie Eleison was also shown on BBC One in the UK, along with Live Earth's world feed, thus honouring the British choir performing in Rome, in remembrance of the victims fallen on the terrorist attacks in London on 7 July 2005, a tragedy mentioned also during Card. Poupard's introduction to the event. Articles about the concert also appeared in The Tablet and The Catholic Herald. The fact that a performance of original sacred music of such elevated standards connected the "Mother of all Churches" (as the Cathedral of Rome is also called) to an event featuring iconic rock acts like Metallica or The Police, denotes a surprising dynamism of certain Vatican departments, although remaining conservative, thus representing a promising breakthrough for the dialogue of a sensible Roman Catholic world with secularized modernity, and overall, with contemporary global culture.

== The Heptavium symbolism ==
Heptavium (literally meaning 'place where seven ways meet') is a Latin neologism conceived by D'Alessandra, who, beside being a musician has an extensive background in Vatican universities and institutes as a researcher. This new word aims at condensing in one concept the Arts of the trivium (grammar, logic, rhetoric) and quadrivium (mathematics, geometry, astronomy, music), the body known as the seven Liberal Arts, as taught in the Cathedral schools and Universities during the Middle Ages.

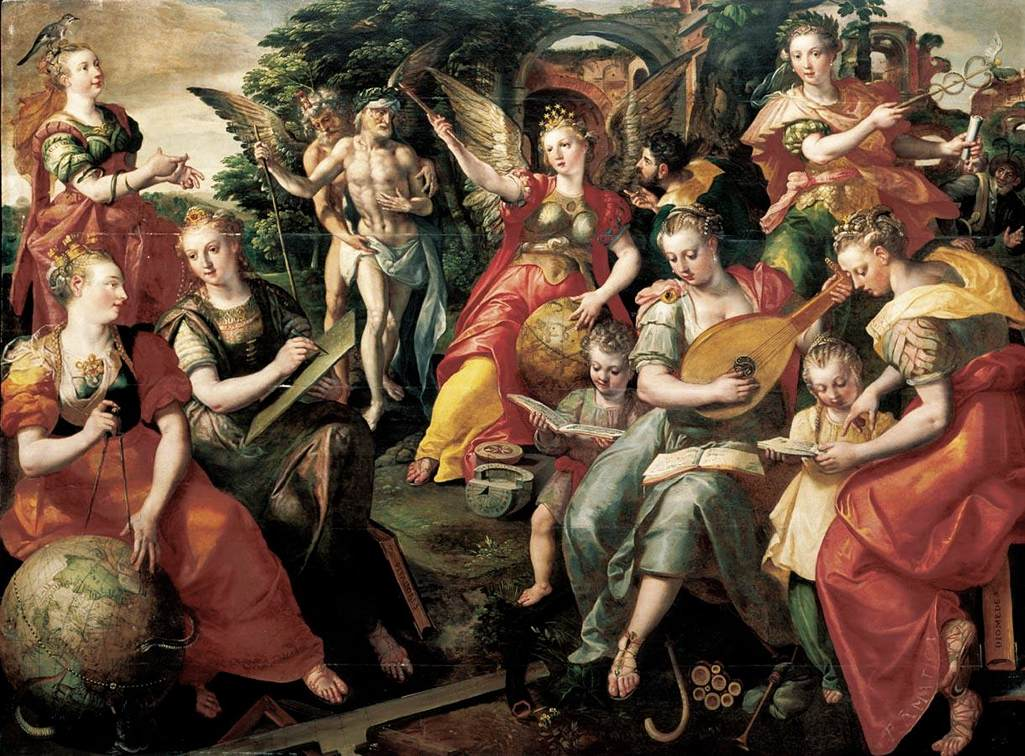
Allegory of the Seven Liberal Arts by Maerten de Vos (1590)

The city of Rome has always been connected to the number seven since its very foundation: built on seven hills, ruled by seven kings, and furthermore enriched by seven churches and by the seven sacraments, the rhythm of Rome and its symbolism has been and is being governed numerically by the number 7 during its pagan imperial rule and since it became the cradle of Christianity. Therefore, Heptavium may become an esoteric nomen secretum, a secret name for Rome itself, literally the "City where seven ways meet".

These concepts and prerogatives were mentioned during Card. Paul Poupard's introductory speech to the concert, linking the symbolical contents directly to the music performed. Moreover, the Heptavium concert was performed both outside and inside the Church, and with two different repertoires and styles of music, profane and sacred-symphonic, to stress the transition from the pagan sphere to the one divinely inspired that the city of Rome has been experiencing for over two millennia.

However, the reason why the date 7 July 2007 was chosen by Pope Benedict XVI as the date for the release of a Motu Proprio related to the traditional Latin Mass, as the date 7 July reflects the number 7 as the Roman number, the Spirit of the Latin Mass canonized by Pope Pius V. Undeniably, this number holds great significance in the Western symbolic tradition and numerology; nevertheless, the importance of a Motu Proprio aiming at reintroducing liturgical functions in Latin for the Church of Rome, weighed on D'Alessandra's decision to utilise exclusively Latin for the Heptavium concert's libretto, stressing Heptavium's alignment to the symbolical orientation of the current pontificate. This original liturgical music in Latin and a Latin neologism with a concept related to Rome paid homage to the city's Cathedral and seat of the Papal authority, ranking even higher than Saint Peter's Basilica at the Vatican and any other Roman Catholic church in the world in terms of canonical primacy.

As a resultance of these two occurrences combined, namely: I) the Heptavium/Live Earth concert, II) the promulgation of Summorum Pontificum, 7 July 2007 may from now on be defined as the Heptavium Dies, the Heptavium Day for the Roman Catholic Church and its future approach to the city of Rome in the contemporary artistic scenario.

1 https://web.archive.org/web/20070904055147/http://www.radiovaticana.org/ung/Articolo.asp?c=144233

2 https://web.archive.org/web/20091015212228/http://www.catholicherald.co.uk/features/f0000279.shtml

3 https://w2.vatican.va/content/benedict-xvi/en/motu_proprio/documents/hf_ben-xvi_motu-proprio_20070707_summorum-pontificum.html
