= Live Earth (2007 concert) =

Event

- Genre: Rock, pop, electronica
- Dates: 7 July 2007
- Locations: Sydney Football Stadium Sydney, New South Wales, Australia; Johannesburg Johannesburg, Gauteng, South Africa; Giants Stadium East Rutherford, New Jersey, United States; Copacabana Beach Rio de Janeiro, Brazil; Rothera Research Station Antarctic Peninsula, Antarctica; Makuhari Messe Chiba, Japan; Tō-ji Kyoto, Kansai, Japan; Oriental Pearl Tower Shanghai, China; Wembley Stadium London, England, United Kingdom; Hamburg Hamburg, Germany; National Mall Washington, D.C., United States; Basilica of St. John Lateran Rome, Lazio, Italy
- Years active: 2007
- Founders: Al Gore, Kevin Wall
- Website: www.liveearth.org (Archived)

Live Earth was a one-off event developed to combat climate change. The first series of benefit concerts were held on July 7, 2007. The concerts brought together more than 150 musical acts in twelve locations around the world which were broadcast to a mass global audience through televisions, radio, and streamed via the Internet.

== Overview ==
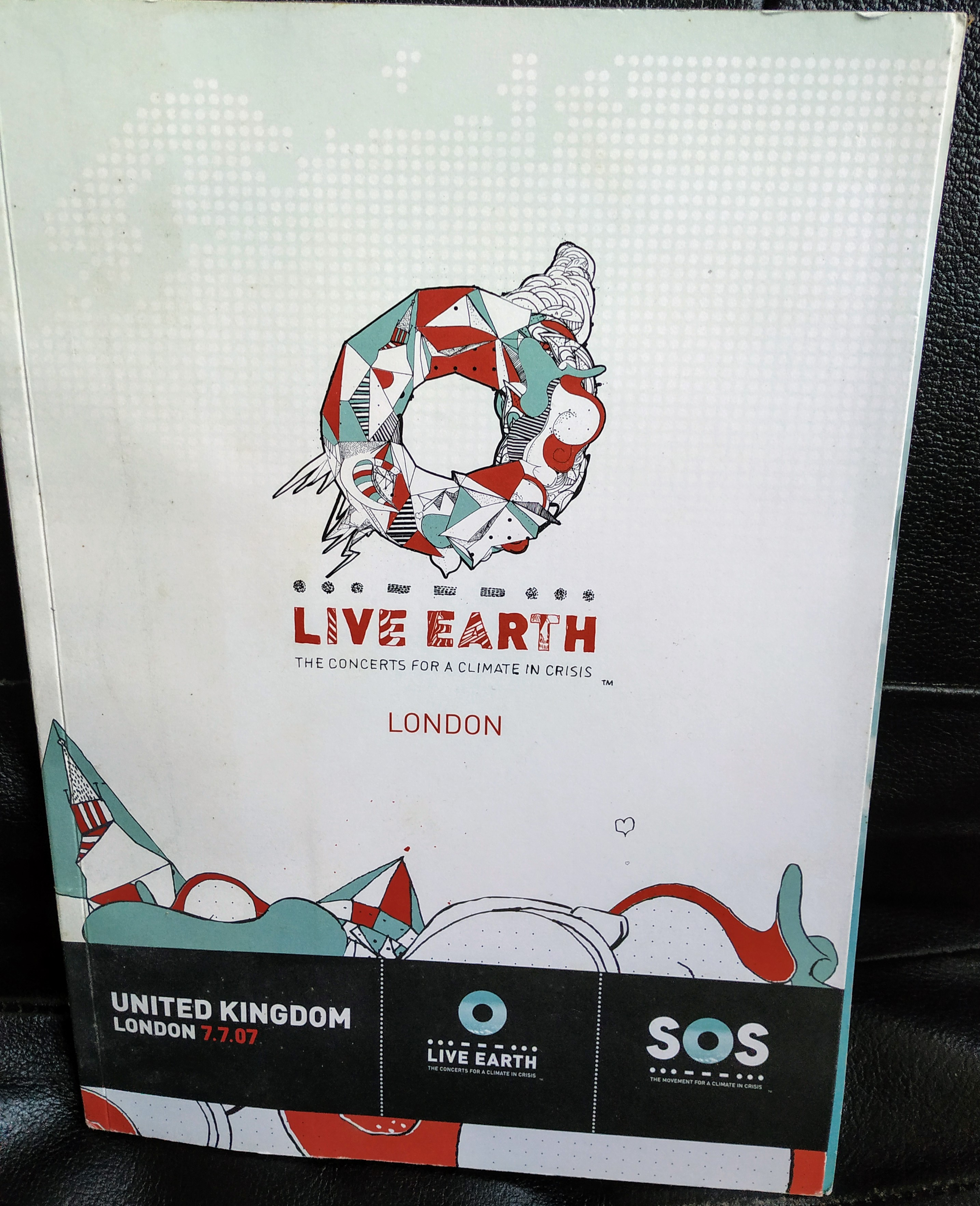
The cover of the Live Earth (London) concert programme

The umbrella organization for the event was Save Our Selves, founded by Kevin Wall (Executive Producer), and included major partners such as former U.S. Vice President Al Gore, the Alliance for Climate Protection, Earthlab, MSN, and Control Room, the production company that produced the event. The logo for the event was the Morse code distress signal. Brand Neutral, the environmental business strategy firm, served as the worldwide sustainability strategy and services partner for Live Earth, developing the overall sustainability strategy, staffing all members of the global "green team," creating the overall master plan for resource management, and supervising the execution of the Live Earth environmental strategy. Leading sustainability expert John Picard served as chief environmental and efficiency counsellor for the event.

The worldwide producer of talent and venue programming for all of the events was Aaron Grosky. The worldwide producer of events was Lily Sobhani. Live Earth produced 60 short films, directed by leading filmmakers from the worlds of films, music videos, commercials and animation. The worldwide producer of Live Earth films was Kit Hawkins. The 22-hour global TV broadcast (world feed) and satellite distribution, as well as radio, internet and mobile production was overseen by Executive in Charge of Production André Mika and produced and directed by Paul Flattery. Ryan Polito also directed the worldwide feed. Unlike the similar Live 8 concerts, which were free, Live Earth charged admission but the event was made broadly available via television and the Internet. Matthew Pohlson and Ryan Cummins served as directors for the concert.

The 2007 event set a new record for online entertainment with over 15 million video streams during the live concert alone. Television ratings were mixed, with 41% of households in Canada watching the concerts, while figures in the UK were characterized as a "flop". Television ratings in the United States were "dismal" as well; NBC's broadcast of Live Earth was the least watched network program between the Big Four Television Networks. On the other hand, Bravo, an NBC Universal property, reported the highest Saturday ratings in the network's history. Live Earth also performed very well on television ratings in Brazil, reaching 37% of households via Rede Globo, and in Germany, reaching 20% of households through the N24 broadcast.

== Background ==
The plans for the Live Earth concerts were announced at a media event in Los Angeles on 15 February 2007 by Al Gore, Kevin Wall and other celebrities. The event was claimed to be carbon neutral, and organisers said they would purchase carbon credits to offset the environmental impact of the flights associated with the events.

In addition to raising awareness of global warming, on 28 June 2007, it was revealed that Live Earth was to be the launch event for the Live Earth Call to Action. During the concerts people were asked to support the following 7-point pledge:

1. To demand that my country join an international treaty within the next 2 years that cuts global warming pollution by 90% in developed countries and by more than half worldwide in time for the next generation to inherit a healthy earth;
2. To take personal action to help solve the climate crisis by reducing my own CO_{2} pollution as much as I can and offsetting the rest to become 'carbon neutral;'
3. To fight for a moratorium on the construction of any new generating facility that burns coal without the capacity to safely trap and store the CO_{2};
4. To work for a dramatic increase in the energy efficiency of my home, workplace, school, place of worship, and means of transportation;
5. To fight for laws and policies that expand the use of renewable energy sources and reduce dependence on oil and coal;
6. To plant new trees and to join with others in preserving and protecting forests; and,
7. To buy from businesses and support leaders who share my commitment to solving the climate crisis and building a sustainable, just, and prosperous world for the 21st century.

In subsequent interviews Al Gore indicated that the concerts would mark 'the beginning of a three-year campaign worldwide to deliver information about how we solve the climate crisis' and that 'the prospects for every future generation depend on us understanding, hearing and acting upon this information.'

Live Earth's supporters included climate change activists in New Zealand's Climaction Coalition, who praised concert organisers, stating "Climate change is the greatest threat facing humanity today." Climaction spokesperson David Colyer said the concert presented "a great opportunity to join our voices with theirs" and called on people who could not attend a concert to participate in local events to raise awareness about climate change.

Further information on the issues raised by the concerts are published in The Live Earth Global Warming Survival Handbook, written by environmentalist David Mayer de Rothschild. Profits from the book are donated to the Alliance for Climate Protection, as are some of the profits from the concerts.

== Antecedents for the style of concerts ==
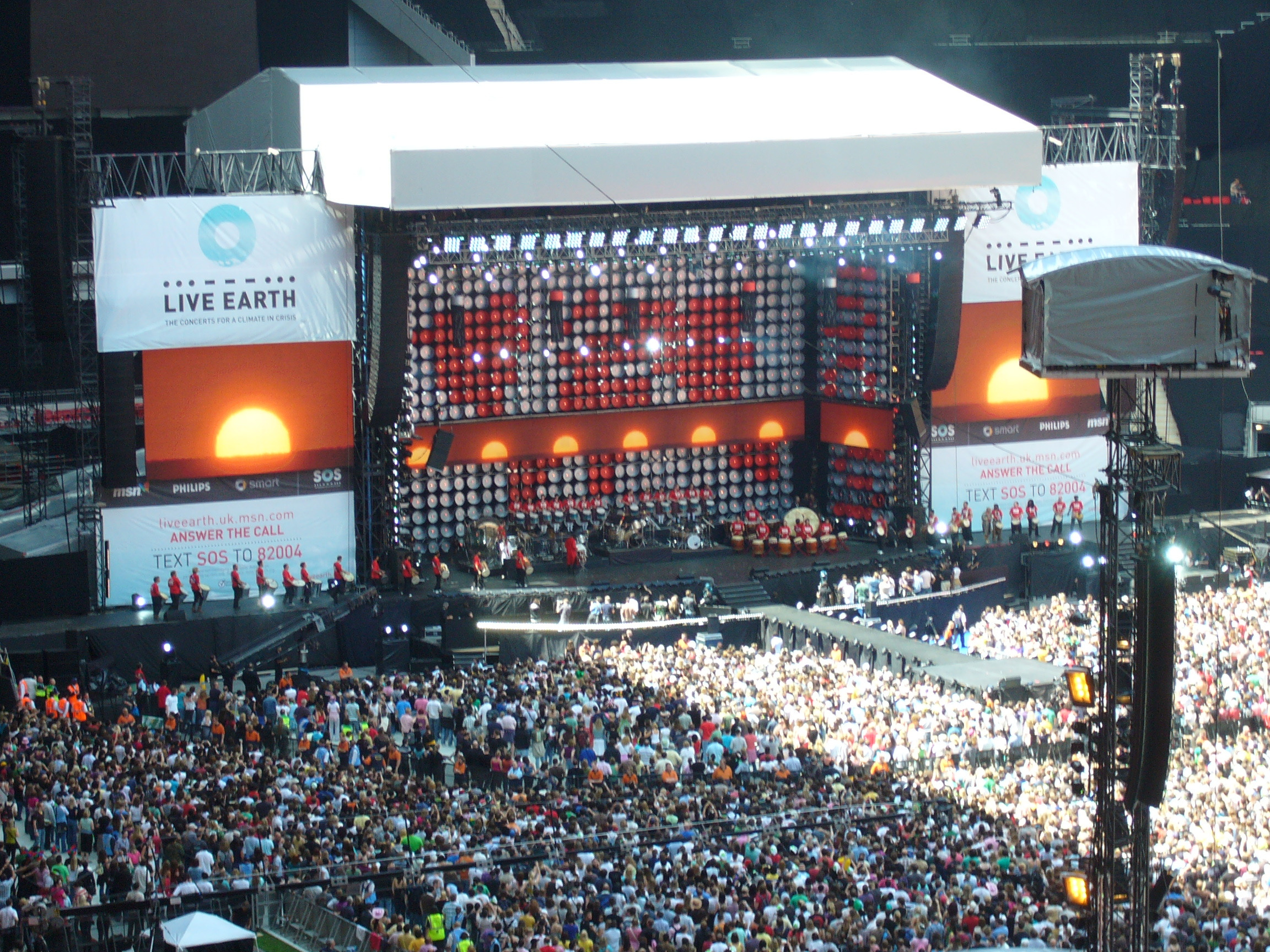
The concert stage at Wembley Stadium.

The concert series followed in the tradition of many benefit events staged in the preceding decades:

- The aspect of multiple concerts on a single day followed two events conceived by Bob Geldof—two Live Aid concerts staged on July 13, 1985, and eight Live 8 concerts staged on July 2, 2005.
- The aspect of a series of rock concerts for a single cause taking place in multiple nations across the planet echoed the twenty concerts presented in 1988 on Amnesty International's Human Rights Now! World Tour - a tour conceived by Jack Healey and Martin Lewis.

The deployment of multiple pop and rock musicians and entertainers to promote awareness of a single cause has many antecedents - the principal examples being:

- Two 1971 Concerts for Bangladesh - conceived by George Harrison and Ravi Shankar
- Amnesty International's Secret Policeman's Balls benefit shows staged from 1976 to 1981 - conceived by John Cleese and Martin Lewis
- Four 1979 No Nukes concerts - conceived by Jackson Browne, Graham Nash, Bonnie Raitt and John Hall
- Four 1979 Concerts for Kampuchea - conceived by Paul McCartney and Kurt Waldheim

== Friends of Live Earth ==
- Live Earth Alert, was a Netherlands contribution/concept, to the real program Live Earth on 07/07/07. In Westerpark in Amsterdam (NL) a parallel event had been organised which included a continuous 24-hour live broadcast program on Nederland 3 of live streams (in sequential order) from Live Earth events and reports from Dutch correspondents stationed on all 7 continents as well as an almost 12 hour side event at the home location with performances, artists and other side activities. Some parts of this Dutch program were included in the official Live Earth streams and broadcast worldwide.
- Korean Broadcasting System (KBS) in South Korea broadcast a special TV program named "Save The Earth - A Friend Of Live Earth", a live event of special presentations, performances, and concerts of the K-pop stars.

== Locations ==
The organizers intended to present concerts on all seven continents. They stated that the venues would use on-site power generation, efficient methods of energy utilisation and sustainable facilities management in an effort to minimise environmental impact.

Venues locations.
Africa
Coca-Cola Dome	Randburg near Johannesburg	South Africa
North America
Giants Stadium	East Rutherford, NJ	United States
National Mall ^{1}	Washington, D.C.	United States
South America
Copacabana Beach	Rio de Janeiro	Brazil
Asia
Makuhari Messe	Chiba near Tokyo	Japan
Tō-ji	Kyoto	Japan
Oriental Pearl Tower	Shanghai	China
Australia
Sydney Football Stadium	Sydney	Australia
Europe
Wembley Stadium	London	United Kingdom
HSH Nordbank Arena	Hamburg	Germany
Basilica of St. John Lateran	Rome	Italy
Antarctica
Rothera Research Station	British Antarctic Territory	British Antarctic Territory
^{1} i.c. premises/venue of Smithsonian National Museum of the American Indian.

The South African concert, originally scheduled for the Cradle of Mankind, was abandoned by local promoter Big Concerts, due to poor ticket sales, believed to be a result of the non-central nature of this landmark and poor planning by the promoter. The Coca-Cola Dome was settled on two days prior to the concert starting.

== Washington D.C. venue ==
It was only hours before the Washington D.C. concert was scheduled to begin that organisers were able to secure a venue for the last-minute addition to the schedule. The Washington Post reported the U.S. capital had been Gore's first choice for the main concert. However, the main concert was moved to New Jersey and Gore made a surprise announcement during a 6 July media interview that a concert would take place on the plaza of the Museum of the American Indian. "Some who don't understand what is now at stake tried to stop this event on the Mall, but here we are. [crowd is cheering] And it wasn't the cavalry who came to our rescue, it was the American Indians," Gore said during brief opening remarks carried live on the MSN website.

== Performers ==
=== Wembley Stadium (United Kingdom) ===
- SOS Allstars (led by Roger Taylor, Chad Smith, and Taylor Hawkins)
- Genesis
- Razorlight
- Snow Patrol
- Damien Rice & David Gray
- Kasabian
- Paolo Nutini
- The Black Eyed Peas
- John Legend
- Duran Duran
- Red Hot Chili Peppers
- Bloc Party
- Corinne Bailey Rae
- Terra Naomi
- Keane
- Metallica
- Spinal Tap
- James Blunt
- Beastie Boys
- The Pussycat Dolls
- Foo Fighters
- Madonna with Eugene Hütz & Sergey Ryabtsev

Presenters:

- Alan Carr
- Boris Becker
- Chris Moyles
- Chris Rock
- David Tennant
- Eddie Izzard
- Gerard Butler
- Geri Halliwell
- Ioan Gruffudd
- Jimmy Carr
- June Sarpong
- Kevin Wall
- Kyle MacLachlan
- Neve Campbell
- Ricky Gervais
- Rob Reiner
- Russell Brand
- Terence Stamp
- Thandie Newton

=== Giants Stadium (East Rutherford, New Jersey, United States) ===
- Kenna
- KT Tunstall
- Taking Back Sunday
- Keith Urban with special guest Alicia Keys
- Ludacris
- AFI
- Fall Out Boy
- Akon
- John Mayer
- Melissa Etheridge
- Alicia Keys
- Dave Matthews Band
- Kelly Clarkson
- Kanye West
- Bon Jovi
- The Smashing Pumpkins
- Roger Waters
- The Police with special guests John Mayer and Kanye West

Presenters:

- Al Gore
- Cameron Diaz
- Dhani Jones
- Jane Goodall
- Kevin Bacon
- Leonardo DiCaprio
- Petra Nemcova
- Rachel Weisz
- Randy Jackson
- Robert Kennedy Jr.
- Rosario Dawson
- Tipper Gore

=== National Mall (United States) ===
- Blues Nation
- Garth Brooks
- Native Roots
- Yarina
- Trisha Yearwood

Presenters:

- Al Gore

=== Sydney Football Stadium (Australia) ===
- Blue King Brown
- Toni Collette & the Finish
- Sneaky Sound System
- Ghostwriters
- Paul Kelly
- Eskimo Joe
- Missy Higgins
- The John Butler Trio
- Wolfmother
- Jack Johnson
- Crowded House

Presenters:

- Bruce McAvaney
- Jimmy Barnes
- Hamish & Andy
- Tim Ross
- Richard Wilkins
- Ian Thorpe

=== Coca-Cola Dome (South Africa) ===
- South African Drum Cafe Team
- Danny K
- Angélique Kidjo
- Baaba Maal
- Vusi Mahlasela
- The Parlotones
- The Soweto Gospel Choir
- Joss Stone
- UB40
- Zola

Presenters:

- Naomi Campbell
- DJ Suga

=== Makuhari Messe (Japan) ===
- Tu Vieja
- Rize
- Ayaka
- Ai Otsuka
- Ai
- Xzibit
- Abingdon Boys School
- Cocco
- Linkin Park
- Kumi Koda
- Rihanna

Presenters:

- Ken Watanabe
- Kazutoshi Sakurai

=== Tō-ji (Japan) ===
- Rip Slyme
- UA
- Bonnie Pink
- Michael Nyman
- Yellow Magic Orchestra

=== HSH Nordbank Arena (Germany) ===
- Shakira with Gustavo Cerati
- Snoop Dogg
- Roger Cicero
- MIA.
- Sasha
- Stefan Gwildis
- Marquess
- Maria Mena
- Silbermond
- Michael Mittermeier
- Chris Cornell
- Enrique Iglesias
- Jan Delay
- Juli
- Katie Melua
- Lotto King Karl
- Mando Diao
- Reamonn with Ritmo Del Mundo
- Revolverheld
- Samy Deluxe
- Yusuf Islam aka Cat Stevens

Presenters:

- Katarina Witt
- Nova Meierhenrich
- Holger Ponick
- Andreas Kuhlage
- Elton
- Tim Mälzer
- Oli P.
- Gülcan Karahancı
- Michael Mittermeier
- Simon Gosejohann
- Eberhard Brandes (WWF Germany)
- Charlotte Engelhardt

=== Copacabana Beach (Brazil) ===
- DJ Dennis
- Xuxa
- Jota Quest
- MC Perlla
- MV Bill
- Marcelo D2
- Pharrell
- O Rappa
- Macy Gray
- Jorge Ben Jor
- Lenny Kravitz
- Banda Zambe
- DJ Janet

=== Oriental Pearl Tower (China) ===
- Evonne Hsu
- Anthony Wong
- Soler
- Huang Xiao Ming
- Douglas Vale
- 12 Girls Band
- Joey Yung
- Winnie Hsin
- Sarah Brightman
- Wang Xiao Kun
- Eason Chan
- Wang Chuang Jun
- Wang Rui
- Pu Ba Jia

=== Basilica of St. John Lateran (Rome, Italy) ===
- The London Oratory School Schola
- The Rome Philharmonic Orchestra
- Michael D'Alessandra
- Christiano Serino
- The Bernini Quartet

=== Rothera Research Station (Antarctica) ===
- Nunatak

== Audience ==
The concerts were broadcast in over 130 countries by more than 500 media partners including television, radio, Internet and wireless channels. National television viewing figures included 19 million viewers in the US, 41% of all households in Canada, 37% of all households in Brazil, and 20% in Germany.

The event also attracted a record on-line audience. Live coverage attracted over 8 million people who watched over 15 million video streams, while total 55 million video streams had been watched by 23 July.

=== United Kingdom ===
London's Wembley Stadium production of "Live Earth," received poor viewing figures on the BBC, blamed on a good weather Saturday afternoon, in addition to the network's tennis coverage at Wimbledon. BBC's live afternoon coverage of the concert drew an average of about 900,000 viewers while the evening viewing figures averaged around 3.1 million and the highlight figures, near the end of the concert, were around 4.5 million. Three times as many viewers had watched the Concert for Diana six days earlier and 9.6 million viewers had watched the Live 8 concert, two years earlier.

== Controversies and criticism ==
While garnering favorable comments, several aspects of the event drew criticism from various perspectives.

=== Republican Political Criticism ===
Some Republicans criticized Al Gore for organising the event and said he did so to promote himself for a 2008 U.S. presidential election bid, although Gore has said repeatedly he is "not planning to be a candidate again for office" and has said that he "had fallen out of love with politics." Gore did not declare himself as a candidate for any of the 2008 presidential primaries.

=== Environmental impact ===
Bands including The Who, Muse and Arctic Monkeys dubbed Live Earth "Private Jets for Climate Change." The event's total carbon footprint, including the artists' and spectators' travel and energy consumption, was probably at least 74,500 tonnes, according to John Buckley of CarbonFootPrint.com - more than 3,000 times the average Briton's annual footprint. An estimate reported that 100,000 planted trees are required to offset total carbon emissions produced during the entire event, as well as a key sponsor for the event being Chevrolet, promoting a new hybrid four-wheel drive.

The BBC cancelled a later major attempt to "raise consciousness" of global climate change. The BBC's news story suggested that this was in part because "poor ratings in the UK and elsewhere for July's Live Earth concert may have confirmed the internal belief that the public do not like being "lectured to" on climate change."

DaimlerChrysler used its low-emissions Smart car brand while sponsoring the event worldwide.

Concert-goers at the event’s London leg had left thousands of plastic cups on the floor of Wembley Stadium, although organisers had urged audience members to use the recycling bins provided, the BBC reported.

Al Gore was unhappy with the travel arrangements of the UK band Razorlight. After their appearance at the London Live Earth event, they were ferried to an airport in a large tour bus with a police escort to catch a private jet to Scotland. From the airport in Scotland they travelled by helicopter to Balado to perform at T in the Park. Razorlight claimed they would offset their emissions by planting trees.

Singer-songwriter John Mayer, one of the big attractions at the New Jersey/New York concert had not signed Gore's seven-point Live Earth pledge. "If you want to peg me as not being entirely eco-friendly, you'll win," Mayer told reporters after his set. "We're just getting together saying 'We want to be healthier'.”

=== Bob Geldof and Live 8 ===
Before the goals of the concerts were announced on June 28, the concert was criticised by Live Aid organiser Bob Geldof and Roger Daltrey of The Who about a lack of a final goal. Geldof said in an interview on 15 May 2007, that the concerts are a waste of time because "Everybody's known about global warming for years." Geldof said he would organise a concert like Live Earth only if he "could go on stage and announce concrete environmental measures from the American presidential candidates, Congress, or major corporations."

A spokesman for Live Earth responded to Geldof, saying that the concerts were intended to raise awareness about the dangers of climate change. "People are aware of global warming but millions are not doing anything about changing their lifestyles."

=== BBC coverage of the London venue ===
The BBC, which televised the concert in the United Kingdom, received a total of 413 complaints because coverage of Metallica's live set was cut short, and approximately 130 complaints concerning swearing as the BBC had shown the concert before the watershed time of 9pm, this includes Chris Rock jokingly calling the crowd "motherfuckers", and another incident where Rock proclaimed the N-word while sitting next to Ricky Gervais. The BBC later apologised for cutting away from footage of Metallica, and both during and after the concert for the bad language. On 12 April 2008, an Ofcom summary of adjudication was shown on BBC1, apologising again for the 'offensive language.'

=== Financial lack of transparency ===
Intelligent Giving have attempted to find out what was happening to the proceeds from ticket sales at the concerts. Their conclusions, published in a feature "What on (Live) Earth is going on?" were that no one involved is capable of giving a clear answer.

== Home release ==
Live Earth: The Concerts for a Climate in Crisis

Live album by various artists
- Released: November 26, 2007
- Label: Warner Bros. Records

Live Earth was documented on Live Earth: The Concerts for a Climate in Crisis, released on November 26 internationally and December 4 in the U.S (DVD 780.97 L) by Warner Bros. Records. Featuring one CD and two DVDs, the set featured footage from the London, New York and Tokyo concerts, six of the short films from the project, and a making of documentary of the concerts. Proceeds from the CD/DVD were directed to the Alliance for Climate Protection.

=== Track list ===
==== CD ====
Disc one (CD)
No.	Title	Artist(s)	Length
1.	"Hey You"	Madonna
2.	"Times Like These"	Foo Fighters
3.	"Driven to Tears"	The Police
4.	"Gravity"	John Mayer
5.	"Another Brick In The Wall Part II"	Roger Waters
6.	"Bleed It Out"	Linkin Park
7.	"Bedshaped"	Keane
8.	"Wanted Dead Or Alive"	Bon Jovi
9.	"Wisemen"	James Blunt
10.	"Black Hole Sun"	Chris Cornell
11.	"Are You Gonna Go My Way"	Lenny Kravitz
12.	"Intergalactic"	Beastie Boys
13.	"Suddenly I See"	KT Tunstall
14.	"Mercy Mercy Me (The Ecology)"	Corinne Bailey Rae & John Legend
15.	"Que Sera, Sera"	Damien Rice & David Gray
16.	"Waiting on the World to Change" (iTunes version exclusive)	John Mayer

==== DVD 1 ====
Disc two (DVD)
No.	Title	Artist(s)	Length
1.	"Live Earth: London Opening"	SOS All-Stars
2.	"Invisible Touch"	Genesis
3.	"Shut Your Eyes"	Snow Patrol
4.	"Que Sera, Sera"	Damien Rice & David Gray
5.	"Suddenly I See"	KT Tunstall
6.	"My Blue Heaven"	Taking Back Sunday
7.	"What A Wonderful World"	Paolo Nutini
8.	"Where Is The Love?"	Black Eyed Peas
9.	"Planet Earth"	Duran Duran
10.	"Miss Murder"	AFI
11.	"Gravity"	John Mayer
12.	"Mercy Mercy Me (The Ecology)"	Corinne Bailey Rae & John Legend
13.	"Bedshaped"	Keane
14.	"Sad but True"	Metallica
15.	"I Need To Wake Up"	Melissa Etheridge
16.	"Too Much"	Dave Matthews Band
17.	"Sober"	Kelly Clarkson
18.	"Tumba"	Angelique Kidjo
19.	"Right to Be Wrong"	Joss Stone
20.	"Wisemen"	James Blunt
21.	"Intergalactic"	Beastie Boys

==== DVD 2 ====
Disc three (DVD)
No.	Title	Artist(s)	Length
1.	"Gimme Shelter"	Keith Urban & Alicia Keys
2.	"Bailamos"	Enrique Iglesias
3.	"Steer"	Missy Higgins
4.	"Woman"	Wolfmother
5.	"Black Hole Sun"	Chris Cornell
6.	"Wanted Dead Or Alive"	Bon Jovi
7.	"Are You Gonna Go My Way"	Lenny Kravitz
8.	"United States"	The Smashing Pumpkins
9.	"Another Brick In The Wall Part II"	Roger Waters
10.	"Driven to Tears"	The Police
11.	"Better Be Home Soon"	Crowded House
12.	"Umbrella"	Rihanna
13.	"Bleed It Out"	Linkin Park
14.	"Times Like These"	Foo Fighters
15.	"La Isla Bonita"	Madonna, featuring Gogol Bordello

Disc three extras
No.	Title	Length
1.	"The Journey to the Inconvenient Truth"
2.	"Making Life Earth Green"
3.	"Live Earth 7-7-07"
4.	"What Can You Do?"

== See also ==
- Live Earth
