= The Bywater (restaurant) =

- Interactive map of The Bywater

Restaurant information
- Established: 2016
- Owner: David Kinch
- Head chef: David Morgan
- Food type: New Orleans-inspired
- Dress code: Casual
- Rating: Michelin Bib Gourmand
- Location: 532 N. Santa Cruz Ave., Los Gatos, CA, 95030, USA
- Coordinates: 37.232732°N 121.978915°W
- Seating capacity: 30
- Reservations: yes
- Website: The Bywater

The Bywater is a casual, New Orleans-inspired restaurant located in Los Gatos, California. The restaurant was founded in 2016 by chef David Kinch, the owner and chef of Michelin 3-star-rated Manresa, also located in Los Gatos. The name of the restaurant is a reference to the New Orleans neighborhood of the same name.

== Awards ==
In 2016, The Bywater was awarded the Michelin Guide's Bib Gourmand designation for "excellent food at a reasonable price" and was recognized by the San Francisco Chronicle's Michael Bauer as a Bay Area "Top 10 new restaurant of 2016".
