= David Kinch =

American chef

- Born: April 4, 1961 (age 64); Pennsylvania, U.S.
- Education: Johnson & Wales University
- Culinary career
- Cooking style: California cuisine
- Rating(s): Michelin stars
- Current restaurant(s): The Bywater Mentone Ritual at Manresa
- Previous restaurant(s): Manresa

David Kinch (born April 4, 1961) is an American chef and restaurateur. He owned and operated Manresa, a restaurant in Los Gatos, California, which was awarded three Michelin stars in 2016. Kinch's California cuisine has strong French, Catalan and Japanese influences. Kinch opened a second restaurant in Los Gatos, called The Bywater, on January 12, 2016.

Manresa has been named one of the World's 50 Best Restaurants by Restaurant Magazine, was in America's Top 50 Restaurants by Gourmet, and has received four stars from the San Francisco Chronicle. He is also dean at the International Culinary Center, founded as the French Culinary Institute in 1984. Kinch is a winner of the Best Chef in America award for the Pacific region from the James Beard Foundation as well as GQ's Chef of the Year for 2011.

== Career ==
Kinch graduated from Johnson & Wales University in Providence, Rhode Island in 1981. He began his career in New York City at the Hotel Parker Meridian, and later held an executive Chef position at La Petite Ferme. In 1984, he left to work under Marc Chevillot at the Hotel de la Poste in Beaune, France.

In 1985 he accepted a kitchen position at the acclaimed "The Quilted Giraffe" in New York City and worked his way up to a management chef position. After leaving the Quilted Giraffe, Kinch spent five months at Mount Eden Vineyards in the Santa Cruz Mountains of California helping Jeffrey Patterson produce the 1988 Chardonnay vintage. Kinch then made his way to the Hotel Clio Court restaurant in Fukuoka, Japan, returning to Northern California to work in the kitchens of San Francisco's Silks and Ernie's restaurants.

Kinch spent two more years in Europe with Dieter Müller at the two star restaurant Schweizer Stuben in Wertheim, Germany; with Marc Meneau, at the three-star restaurant L'Esperance in St. Pere-sous-Vézeley, Burgundy, France; and at Pedro Subijana's Akelarre in San Sebastián, Spain.

Kinch opened his first restaurant, the bistro-style Sent Sovi, with Aimee Hébert in Saratoga, California in 1995. Kinch and Hébert operated the restaurant for seven years.

Kinch founded Manresa in Los Gatos in 2002. It received little notice at the time, though the local press called it "a culinary dream venue... for those who take food seriously". He purchased the former Village House restaurant location, writing that he was encouraged by chef Thomas Keller to buy a building while retrieving a forgotten wine bag at the French Laundry restaurant in Napa Valley, where Kinch had dined the night before. Manresa closed at the end of December 2022, but re-opened in 2024 as "Ritual at Manresa": a venue for other Michelin-starred chefs to offer month-long guest appearances.

Kinch also runs Mentone -- a French/Italian restaurant he started in Aptos, CA in 2020.

=== Cookbook ===
In October 2013, Kinch published a 328-page cookbook, Manresa: An Edible Reflection, with Christine Muhlke. The book featured photographs by Eric Wolfinger and an introduction by owner-chef Eric Ripert of Manhattan seafood restaurant Le Bernardin.

=== Television ===
Kinch appeared as a guest judge along with award-winning sommelier Andre Mack on episode 4 (entitled "Daring Pairings") of season 1 of the ABC reality show The Taste, which aired on February 12, 2013. He also appeared as a guest judge on seasons 11 and 15 of Top Chef.

Kinch, along with Gabrielle Hamilton, is featured in season four of The Mind of a Chef. Together, Kinch and Hamilton share the 2016 Daytime Emmy Award for Outstanding Culinary Host for their role on the program.

== Critical reception ==
A 2005 write-up in the London Observer, in which food critic Jay Rayner called his 26-course meal at Manresa his most memorable of 2004, started the international acclaim that transformed Kinch into one of the most celebrated chefs of his generation.

Anthony Bourdain attended a Kinch meal and stated it was a "wildly creative but well-thought-out meal. Beautifully presented - surprisingly minimalist, very, very tasty. ... This guy is indeed something special."
