= Susan Smalley =

American geneticist

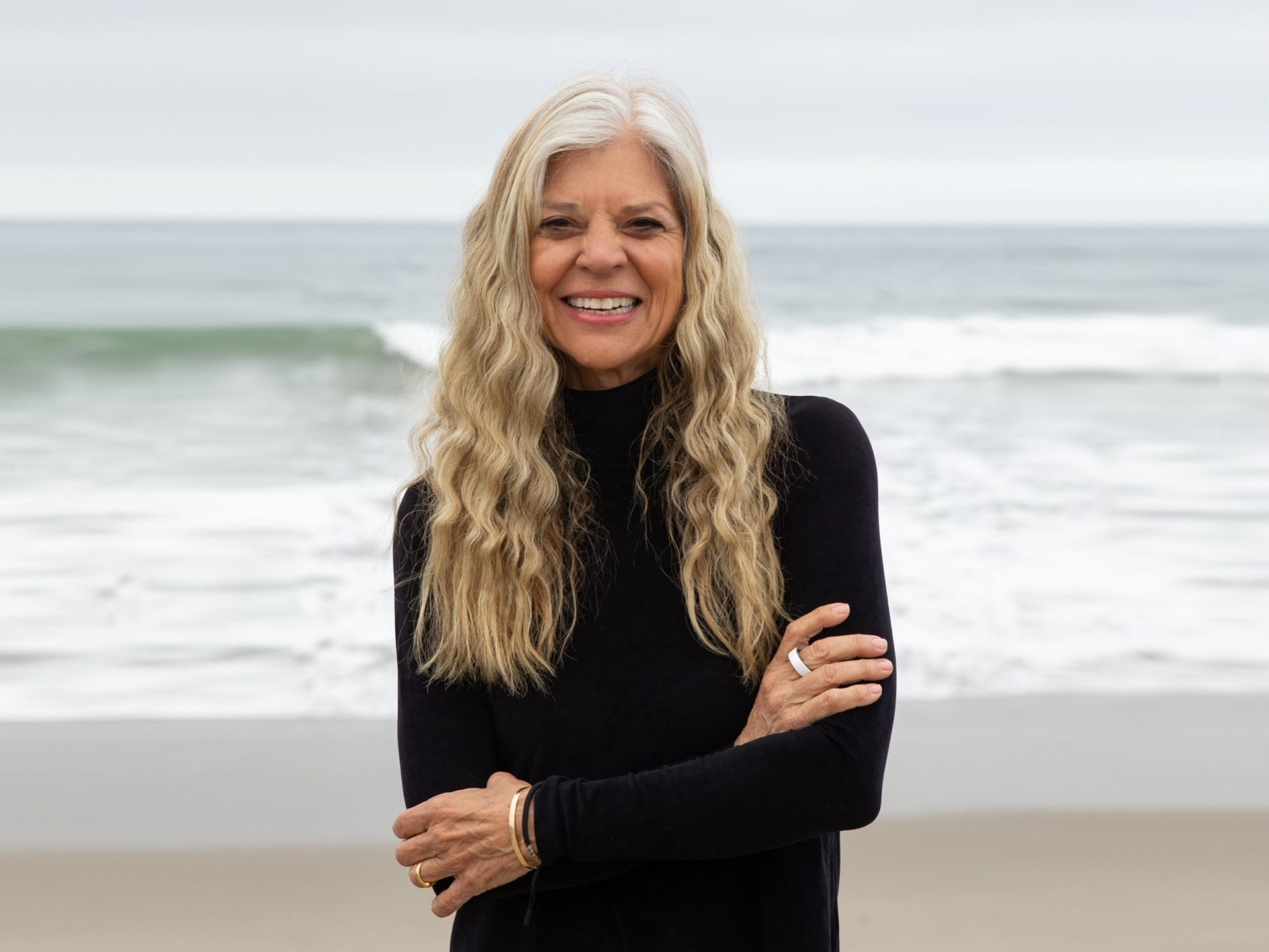
- Born: Minneapolis, Minnesota, U.S.
- Education: University of Michigan, BA, Anthropology, 1976; University of California, Los Angeles, MA, Anthropology, 1981; University of California, Ph.D, Anthropology, 1985
- Occupations: Behavioral Geneticist, Writer, Activist, Investor
- Known for: Genetics of attention deficit hyperactivity Disorder (ADHD) and autism spectrum disorders Mindfulness meditation
- Spouse: Kevin Wall
- Scientific career
- Fields: Behavioral genetics mindfulness
- Institutions: University of California, Los Angeles
- Thesis: Genetic influences on spatial ability: Transmission in an extended kindred (1985)
- Website: www.suesmalley.com

Susan Smalley is an American behavioral geneticist, writer and activist. The co-author of Fully Present: The Science, Art, and Practice of Mindfulness, she is the founder of the UCLA Mindful Awareness Research Center at the Jane and Terry Semel Institute for Neuroscience and Human Behavior (MARC), and professor emerita in the department of psychiatry and biobehavioral sciences at UCLA. Her research centers on the genetic basis of childhood-onset behavior disorders, such as ADHD, and the cognitive and emotional impact of mindfulness meditation on health and wellbeing. She has published more than 100 peer-reviewed papers and lectured globally on the genetics of human behavior and the science of mindfulness.

== Career ==
=== PTK Capital ===
Smalley is the co-founder of PTK Capital, an investment fund that invests in early stage companies and venture capital funds. The firm's investment activities focus on transformative companies in the areas of Entertainment, Food and Wellness. PTK Capital supports "people and ideas with the potential to significantly benefit the human condition."

Smalley is also on the scientific advisory board for Stop Breathe and Think, an app for emotional well-being; and the board of directors for Equality Now, an international human rights organization focused on women and girls; and was honored by Equality Now in December 2019.

=== UCLA, ADHD and behavior genetics ===
Smalley joined the faculty at UCLA after she completed post-doctoral fellowships in medical genetics and childhood psychopathology, moving from assistant to full professor until her retirement to emeritus in 2011.

In 1988 she published a review paper on the genetics of autism in JAMA Psychiatry. Following its publication, she received a National Institute of Health (NIH) grant to investigate genetic determinants in autism, and pioneered an approach to behavioral genetics by studying known genetic disorders with behavioral sequelae, specifically, the study of tuberous sclerosis complex (TSC), a genetic disorder in which autistic disorder occurs at higher rates than the general population. She continued to research autism for the following ten years, producing numerous papers on the genetics and subclinical variants of autism beyond the diagnostic classification as well as genetic and behavioral studies of TSC.

Smalley's focus subsequently shifted to ADHD. Her lab produced more than 40 publications on the disorder, including the first genome-wide scan (in conjunction with investigators at Oxford University), candidate gene investigations, and a series of papers on ADHD among a northern Finnish birth cohort. She wrote extensively on the strengths of those with ADHD, characterizing it as a different way of thinking rather than a deficit.

=== Mindful awareness ===
Smalley was diagnosed with an early stage melanoma in 2002. She took a leave of absence to explore non-western wellness practices, and in addition to significant lifestyle changes, she developed a meditation practice. When she returned to UCLA, she began researching mindfulness meditation and its impact on ADHD and other disorders. She subsequently led seminal studies that demonstrated the relationship between mindfulness and common personality traits of those with ADHD, mindfulness as an intervention in ADHD, and school-based approaches to bringing mindfulness to children.

Smalley founded the Mindful Awareness Research Center at the UCLA Semel Institute for Neuroscience and Human Behavior (MARC) to bring meditation practices to the general public through research and education. In an article for the Huffington Post, she wrote: "As a scientist, I love the challenge of understanding my mind, from the inside, while learning what science tells us from the outside. The merging of these two approaches will yield knowledge far greater than either can alone."

In 2010, Smalley and Diana Winston, a former Buddhist nun and the director of education at MARC, wrote Fully Present: The Science, Art, and Practice of Mindfulness. It explores the science of meditation and provides guidance to develop a mindfulness practice.

Smalley also writes regularly for the Huffington Post and Psychology Today. She was the keynote speaker at the UCLA Department of Anthropology commencement ceremony in 2013, and the 2017 Children and Adults with Attention Deficit Hyperactivity Disorder (CHADD) annual conference.

== Education ==
Smalley majored in biological anthropology at the University of Michigan, and as an undergraduate became interested in population genetics and human evolution. She received a BA in anthropology in 1976, and in 1981 earned an MA in anthropology from UCLA. She was awarded a Ph.D. in anthropology with specialization in population genetics from UCLA in 1985. Her dissertation examined the genetics of spatial ability.

== Personal life ==
Smalley is married to Kevin Wall, an entrepreneur, activist, and investor. They have three children.

== Selected publications ==
=== Mindful Awareness ===
- Smalley, Lidia Zylowska, Deborah L. Ackerman, May H. Yang, Julie L. Futrell, Nancy L. Horton, T. Sigi Hale, Caroly Pataki; "Mindfulness Meditation Training in Adults and Adolescents with ADHD: A Feasibility Study"; The Journal of Attention Disorders; 2008.
- Smalley, Sandra K. Loo, T. Sigi Hale, Ph.D., Anshu Shrestha, M.S., M.P.H, James McGough, M.D, Lisa Flook, Ph.D., and Steven Reise, Ph.D.; "Mindfulness and Attention Deficit Hyperactivity Disorder"; Journal of Clinical Psychology (2009)
- Smalley, Lisa Flook, M. Jennifer Kitil, Brian M. Galla, Susan Kaiser-Greenland, Jill Locke, Eric Ishijima, Connie Kasari; "Effects of Mindful Awareness Practices on Executive Functions in Elementary School Children" Journal of Applied School Psychology (2010)

=== Behavior Genetics and ADHD ===
- Smalley; "Reframing ADHD in the Genomic Era"; Psychiatric Times (2008)
- Smalley, Deborah E. Lynn, Gitta Lubke, May Yang, James T. McCracken, James J. McGough, Janeen Ishii, Sandra K. Loo, Stanley F. Nelson; "Temperament and Character Profiles and the Dopamine D4 Receptor Gene in ADHD"; American Journal of Psychiatry (2005)
- Smalley, Sandra K. Loo, May Yang, RM Cantor; "Toward Localizing Genes Underlying Cerebral Asymmetry and Mental Health"; American Journal of Medicine, Neuropsychiatric Genetics (2005)
- Smalley, Simon E.Fisher, James T.McCracken, James J.McGough, Angela J.Marlow, Laurence MacPhie, Dianne F.Newbury, Lori R.Crawford, Christina G.S.Palmer, Arthur Woodward, Melissa Del’Homme, Dennis P.Cantwell, Stanley F.Nelson, Anthony P.Monaco; "A Genomewide Scan for Loci Involved in Attention-Deficit/Hyperactivity Disorder"; American Journal of Human Genetics (2002)
- Smalley; "Genetic Influences in Childhood-onset Psychiatric Disorders: Autism and Attention-deficit/hyperactivity disorder"'; American Journal of Behavior Genetics (1997)

=== Gender Equality ===
- Smalley; "Girl's Education: A Right to Learn"; Gordon and Sarah Brown High Level Panel for the Global Campaign for Education (2013)
- Smalley; "Getting Enlightened About Prostitution"; Huffington Post (2015)
