= Flipper's Roller Boogie Palace =

Roller disco

- Address: Ariel Way; W12 7SL, London
- Owner: Liberty Ross, Co-Founder and Creative Director; Kevin Wall, Co-Founder and Chairman of the Board; Usher, Brand Ambassador

Construction
- Opened: April 2022

Website
- www.flippers.world

Flipper's Roller Boogie Palace is a seasonal outdoor roller skating rink that opened in April 2022 in New York City's Rockefeller Center. It marks the revival of the original Flipper's, which operated as a roller disco in Los Angeles from 1979 to 1981 and was dubbed "Studio 54 on wheels" by actor Jaclyn Smith.

== The Original Flipper's (1979–81) ==
Flipper's Roller Boogie Palace was founded in 1979 by Ian "Flipper" Ross in West Hollywood, Los Angeles. It was housed inside a golden-domed art deco building on the corner of Santa Monica Boulevard and La Cienega, the site of a former bowling alley.

The family-owned roller rink attracted an eclectic mix of skaters, from local drag queens and punk rockers to celebrities and exhibitionists who took advantage of Flipper's lax dress code. Prince wore "stockings, pumps [and] silky little bikini underwear" when he performed there on March 31, 1981 during his Dirty Mind Tour. Other celebrities who rolled into Flipper's over the years included the Go-Go's, who performed regularly on a mid-rink stage, Elton John, Sting, Kareem Abdul-Jabbar, Margaux Hemingway, Robin Williams, Cher, Jane Fonda and Chic's Nile Rodgers, who often skated to the rink from his nearby home to DJ.

Their visits are chronicled in Liberty Ross’ 2021 book "Flipper's Roller Boogie Palace 1979-81," a visual history of the roller disco that Vogue magazine once called "the West Coast's hottest nightspot."

The original Flipper's closed in October 1981.

== Flipper's New York Revival (2022) ==
Flipper's Roller Boogie Palace launched its first new location on April 15, 2022, at The Rink at Rockefeller Center, the sunken plaza in midtown Manhattan that has been the home of the Rockefeller Center Christmas tree since 1933 and ice skating rink since 1936. The first roller rink to operate in Rockefeller Center since 1940, Flipper's Roller Boogie Palace is co-founded by Kevin Wall and Liberty Ross, the daughter of Flipper's founder Ian "Flipper" Ross, and her husband, entrepreneur and record executive Jimmy Iovine.

Flipper's brand ambassador is singer/songwriter Usher, an avid roller skater who headlined the opening night party, performing his 2002 Top 10 hit "U Don't Have to Call." Other guests included will.i.am, Mary J. Blige, Dr. Dre, Patti Smith, Jon Batiste and Gayle King.

The Flipper's revival coincides with renewed interest in the sport of roller skating since the onset of the COVID-19 pandemic. "Roller skating is in vogue these days," reported The New York Times in 2021.

There are spectator viewing areas at rinkside and on the upper-level esplanades and plaza. Flipper's Shop at the Rock, a retail pop-up shop on Fifth Avenue, sells the brand's "iconic roller wear and gear."

== Charity ==
Flipper's donated $1 from every skate rental in 2022 to the Saks Fifth Avenue Foundation, whose mission is to promote mental health awareness and education.

== Season schedule ==
Flipper's Rockefeller Center opened on April 15, 2022 and closed for the season on October 31.

The rink's 2023 season runs from April 14 through October. Flipper's is open Sunday–Wednesday from 12 p.m. to 10 p.m and Thursday–Saturday from noon to midnight. A one-hour skate session costs $22 for adults and $15 for children ages 4–12 who bring their own skates. The skate rental fee is $10.

== Other locations ==
A second Flipper's opened in West London, England, on November 11, 2022 and subsequently closed on October 13, 2024. Additional locations are reportedly in the works.
