= Bywater (restaurant) =

Restaurant in Warren, Rhode Island, U.S.

- Interactive map of Bywater

Restaurant information
- Location: 54 State Street, Warren, Rhode Island, 02885, United States
- Coordinates: 41°43′46″N 71°17′05″W

Bywater is a restaurant in Warren, Rhode Island. In 2024, Bywater was a semifinalist in the Outstanding Restaurant category of the James Beard Foundation Awards.
