= Live Earth Alert =

Live Earth Alert has been organised in the Netherlands on 7 July 2007 in addition to the worldwide event of Live Earth and had a unique character because of its length and total concept.

== Background ==
In the Netherlands they presented and broadcast live a 24hour program 'Live Earth Alert' on 7 July 2007, the day of Live Earth from almost 08:00-08:00hrs including live-streams from all 7 continents and stadiums (in sequential other).
All times in W.E.T., it started early Saturday-morning 07/07 and finished Sunday-morning 07/08.

== Broadcast ==
Nederland 3 (public television station TV Netherlands 3) by BNN, NOS, LLink and 3FM (public radio station Radio 3FM).

Live Earth Alert has included worldwide reports from Dutch correspondents stationed in all 7 seven continents and also from the home-location Westerpark in Amsterdam: (Live Earth Alert), where parallel run a concert-program on stage produced by the Dutch from 12:00-23:00hrs, local time in the Netherlands.

== See also ==
- Live Earth
- 21World
