= Manresa (restaurant) =

Prestigious eatery; Los Gatos, California

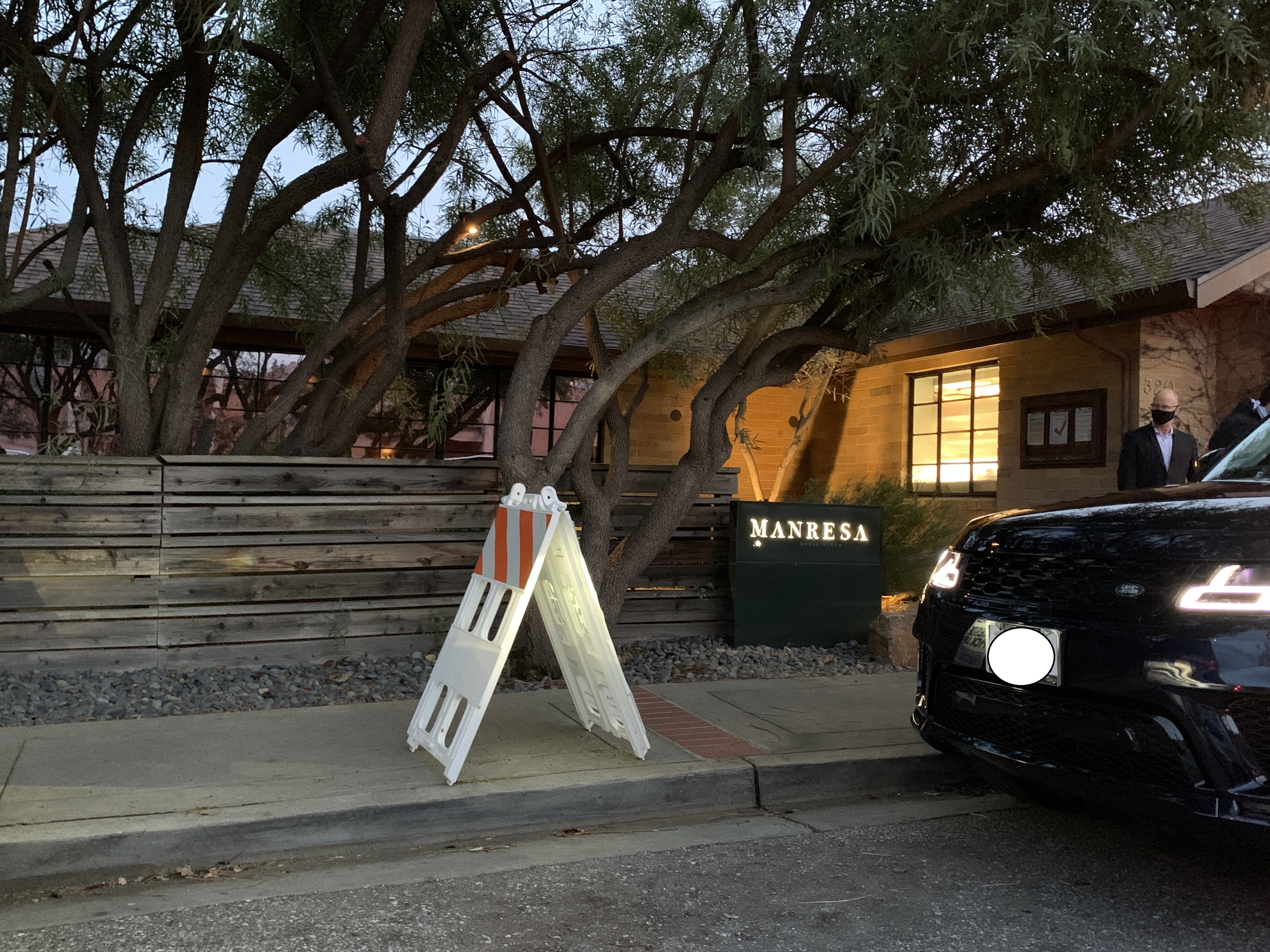
- Interactive map of Manresa

Restaurant information
- Established: 2002; 24 years ago
- Closed: December 31, 2022; 3 years ago
- Owner: David Kinch
- Head chef: David Kinch
- Chef: Nicholas Romero
- Food type: La Selva Beach cuisine
- Rating: (Michelin Guide)
- Location: 320 Village Lane, Los Gatos, Santa Clara County, California, 95030, United States
- Coordinates: 37.2273967°N 121.98076900000001°W
- Website: www.manresarestaurant.com

Manresa was a restaurant in Los Gatos, California that specialized in California cuisine. It was founded in 2002 by chef David Kinch. The Michelin Guide: San Francisco, Bay Area and Wine Country conferred two Michelin stars on the restaurant in 2007, and upgraded it to three stars in 2016.

A two-alarm fire at Manresa caused substantial damage to the restaurant on July 7, 2014. After extensive work and a complete kitchen rebuild, it re-opened on New Year's Eve, 2014.

The San Francisco Chronicle rated the restaurant four stars in 2012 and 2015. In 2012, Forbes rated Manresa the best restaurant in the United States. The restaurant was also a finalist in the 2014 James Beard Foundation Award for Outstanding Restaurant.

In November 2022, Kinch announced Manresa's closure with its final day being December 31 of that year.

The restaurant subsequently re-opened in 2024 as Ritual at Manresa: a venue where Kinch invites various Michelin-starred chefs to exhibit their cuisines for a month each.

== See also ==
- List of defunct restaurants of the United States
- List of Michelin starred restaurants in San Francisco Bay Area and Northern California
- List of Michelin 3-star restaurants
- List of Michelin 3-star restaurants in the United States
