= Kevin Wall =

American investor & concert producer

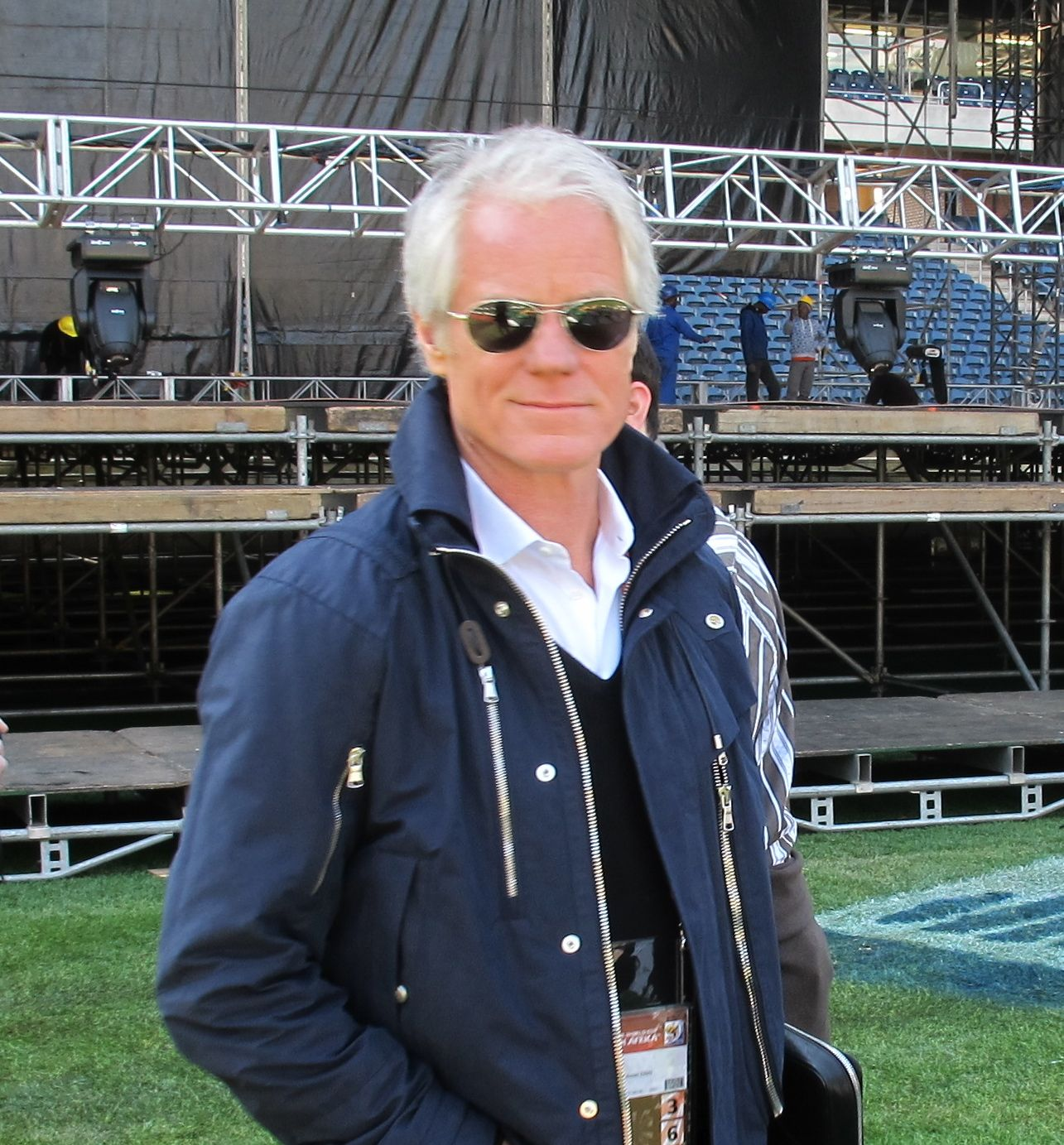
- Wall at Orlando Stadium in Soweto, South Africa in June 2010
- Occupations: Producer, entrepreneur, activist, investor
- Years active: 1984 - present
- Organization(s): PTK Capital (CEO and founder); Dreamscape Immersive (co-chairman and co-founder); Control Room (CEO and founder)
- Known for: Live Earth, Live 8, Chime for Change
- Board member of: Category41; Dreamscape Immersive; Flipper's Roller Boogie Palace; PTK Capital
- Spouse: Susan Smalley
- Children: 3
- Awards: Billboard Humanitarian of the Year; EMA Outstanding Achievement Award; Emmy Award, Interactive Content; Ellis Island Medal of Honor; MIDEM Green Award
- Website: ptkcapital.com

Kevin Wall is an American entrepreneur, investor, activist and Emmy Award-winning producer of international events such as the benefit concert series Live Earth and Live 8.

His first media company, Radio Vision International, produced international benefit concerts such as USA for Africa in 1985 as well as Human Rights Now! and the Nelson Mandela 70th Birthday Tribute in 1988. Wall was also the executive producer of the FIFA World Cup Kick Off Celebration, Live Earth: The Concerts for a Climate Crisis with former Vice President Al Gore and Live 8, which earned Wall the first Emmy Award for content delivered via the internet in 2006.

== Career ==
=== Stage One, Inc. ===
At 18, Wall moved to Ann Arbor, Michigan and he started promoting concerts at the University of Michigan and other Midwest colleges. After he was asked to provide a portable stage for a George Harrison show, Wall founded Stage One, Inc., a portable staging company. Within a few years, Stage One was the provider of lighting, staging, and outdoor production for stadium and arena tours for The Rolling Stones, Led Zeppelin, The Who, and other artists.

=== Radio Vision International ===
In 1984, Wall founded Radio Vision International, a company which "pioneered the business of international music video licensing."

Not long after that Radio Vision was distributing 60 music television programs internationally and worked with nonprofit and philanthropic organizations including Live Aid, USA for Africa, the Human Rights Now! Tour, the 70th birthday tribute to South African activist and former president Nelson Mandela and the annual Prince's Trust Rock Gala, sponsored by Prince Charles.

=== BoxTop, iXL ===
In 1994 Wall established BoxTop, a web design company, which was merged with iXL, an Atlanta-based media and internet consulting company, and became vice-chairman. Wall led the strategic acquisition and organization of 42 internet design and consulting companies, building a company with 3,000 employees, 38 offices and annual revenues of more than $400 million. iXL went public in 1999 and reached a market capitalization of $2 billion within one year.

=== Live 8 ===
Wall was the executive producer of Live 8, a series of concerts around the world on July 2, 2005, to raise money and awareness in the fight against poverty in Africa. The Live 8 lineup featured more than 250 musical acts, including Madonna, U2, Destiny's Child, Jay-Z, and Pink Floyd who performed within 24 hours of one another at concerts on seven continents. Utilizing both legacy and new media, Live 8's live multi-feed webcast attracted an estimated audience of 2 billion people, a then-record for online viewership. As the executive producer of Live 8, Wall won the first Emmy for content delivered via the internet. It was later described as being a "tipping point" and the "defining moment" in online content distribution.

=== Network LIVE, Control Room ===
In 2005, Wall created Network LIVE, a joint venture with AEG, AOL, and XM Satellite Radio. In 2006, he acquired full control of Network LIVE and renamed it Control Room. Inspired by former Vice President Al Gore and his Oscar-winning documentary, An Inconvenient Truth, Wall co-created Live Earth, a global concert event designed to raise environmental awareness and combat climate change. On July 7, 2007, 150 musical acts, including The Police, Alicia Keys, Metallica, and Kanye West performed at 11 sites worldwide. The concerts were broadcast globally through television, satellite and terrestrial radio, handheld devices, and the internet. The event set a live-streaming record as 237,000 people watched video coverage from MSN simultaneously. Live Earth reached a total audience of nearly 1.5 billion people and set live streaming records, with 15 million streams initiated during the live event, and 100 million the following week.

While initially conceived as a one-time event, Live Earth became an advocacy organization, working with corporate, non-governmental, entertainment and political influencers, and other organizations around the world. As of 2015, Control Room had created, developed, distributed and/or produced more than 150 events such as the Green Inaugural Ball, the FIFA World Cup Kick off Celebration in 2010, and Gucci’s Chime for Change concert in 2013. Control Room has won 11 Telly Awards Awards for excellence in a variety of categories including education, information, news, social issues, and videography.

=== Dreamscape Immersive ===
In 2016, Wall co-founded Dreamscape Immersive, an entertainment and technology company, with legendary producer Walter Parkes. Dreamscape Immersive creates story-based full-roam virtual reality experiences allowing as many as six people at once to explore a virtual 3D environment, seeing fully rendered avatars of one another. He serves as co-chairman of the company, which received nearly $40 million in investments from film studios, AMC, IMAX, Steven Spielberg, and others.

=== Craton Equity Partners, Shelter Capital Partners ===
Wall was a general partner of Craton Equity Partners, a $242 million green-tech private equity fund, and was a founder of Sustainable Holdings, a company which weights its holdings based on a company's sustainability score. He co-founded Shelter Capital Partners, a $175 million venture capital fund focused on companies in the semiconductor, software, and convergence sectors.

=== PTK Capital ===
In 2015, Wall founded PTK Capital, which invests in transformative companies in the entertainment, food and wellness industries.

== Personal life ==
Wall is married to Susan Smalley, a scientist, author, activist, and professor emeritus at UCLA in the Department of Psychiatry and Biobehavioral Sciences. Smalley is on the board of Equality Now, a human rights organization dedicated to women and girls. They have three children, Patrick, Timmy, and Kelly.

== Recognition and awards (partial list) ==
- Advertising Age Marketer of the Year
- Ellis Island Medal of Honor
- EMA Outstanding Achievement Award
- GQ Environmental Pillar Award
- MIDEM Green Award

== Selected credits ==
Wall has an executive producer credit for all of the productions.

Year	Title
2013	Chime for Change (concert)
2013	24 Hours of Reality: The Cost of Carbon
2013	The Sound of Change Live
2011	Decade of Difference: A Concert Celebrating 10 Years of the William J. Clinton Foundation
2010	FIFA World Cup Kick-Off Celebration Concert
2010	Live Earth Run for Water
2008	Madonna: Live from Roseland Ballroom
2007	Jay-Z: Live from Hammerstein Ballroom
2007	Live Earth: The Concerts for a Climate Crisis
2007	Michael Bublé: Live from Webster Hall
2006	Nokia New Year's Eve
2005	Live 8
1994	Apollo Theater Hall of Fame
1993	Apollo Theatre Hall of Fame
1993	Bob Dylan: The 30th Anniversary Concert Celebration
1992	Michael Jackson: Live in Bucharest: The Dangerous Tour
1992	Elton John: Live in Barcelona
