= Frank Rosin =

German cook, TV chef and restaurateur

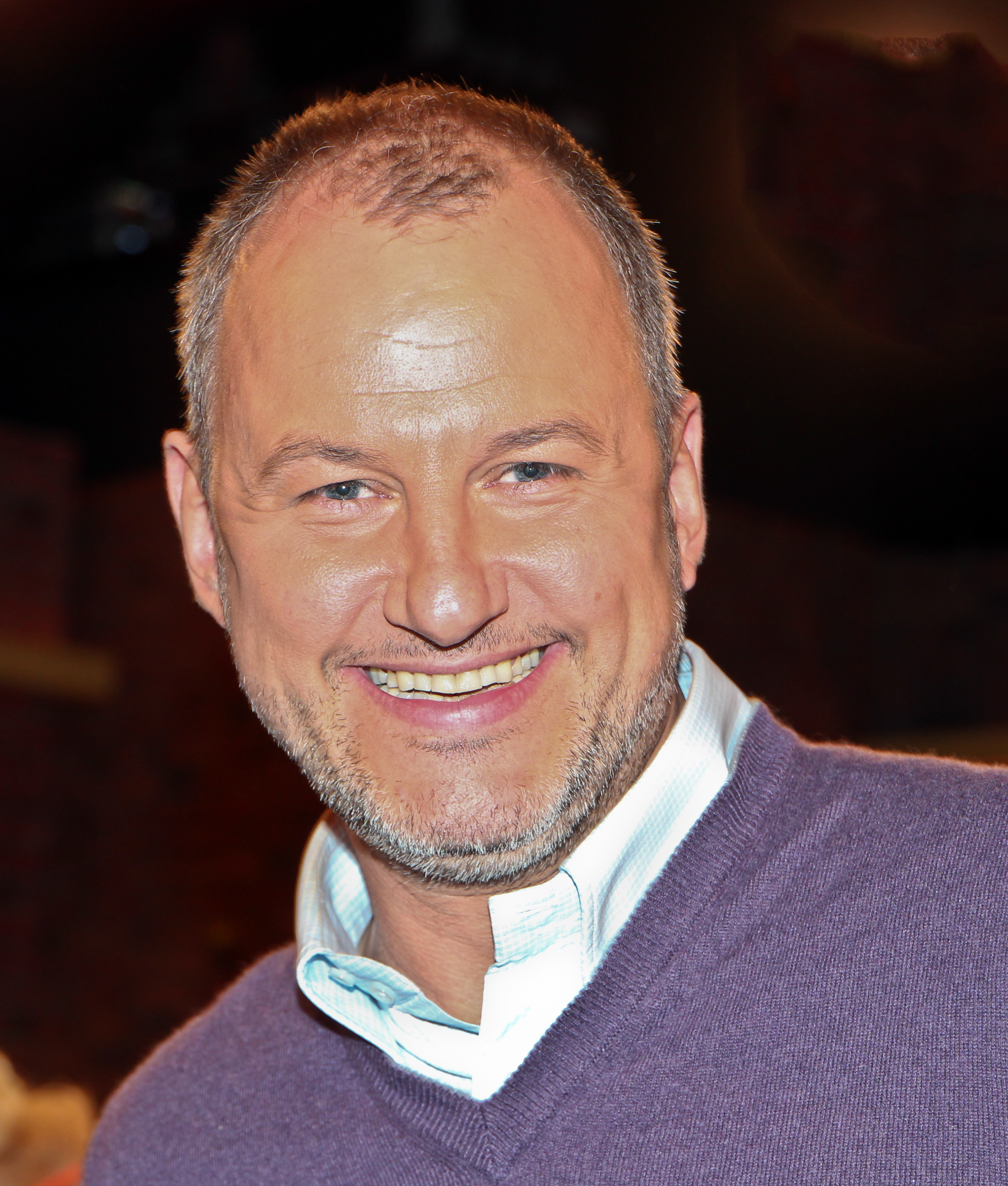
Rosin in 2011 Signature Frank Rosin

Frank Rosin (born 17 July 1966 in Dorsten) is a German celebrity chef, restaurateur and entrepreneur.

== Career ==
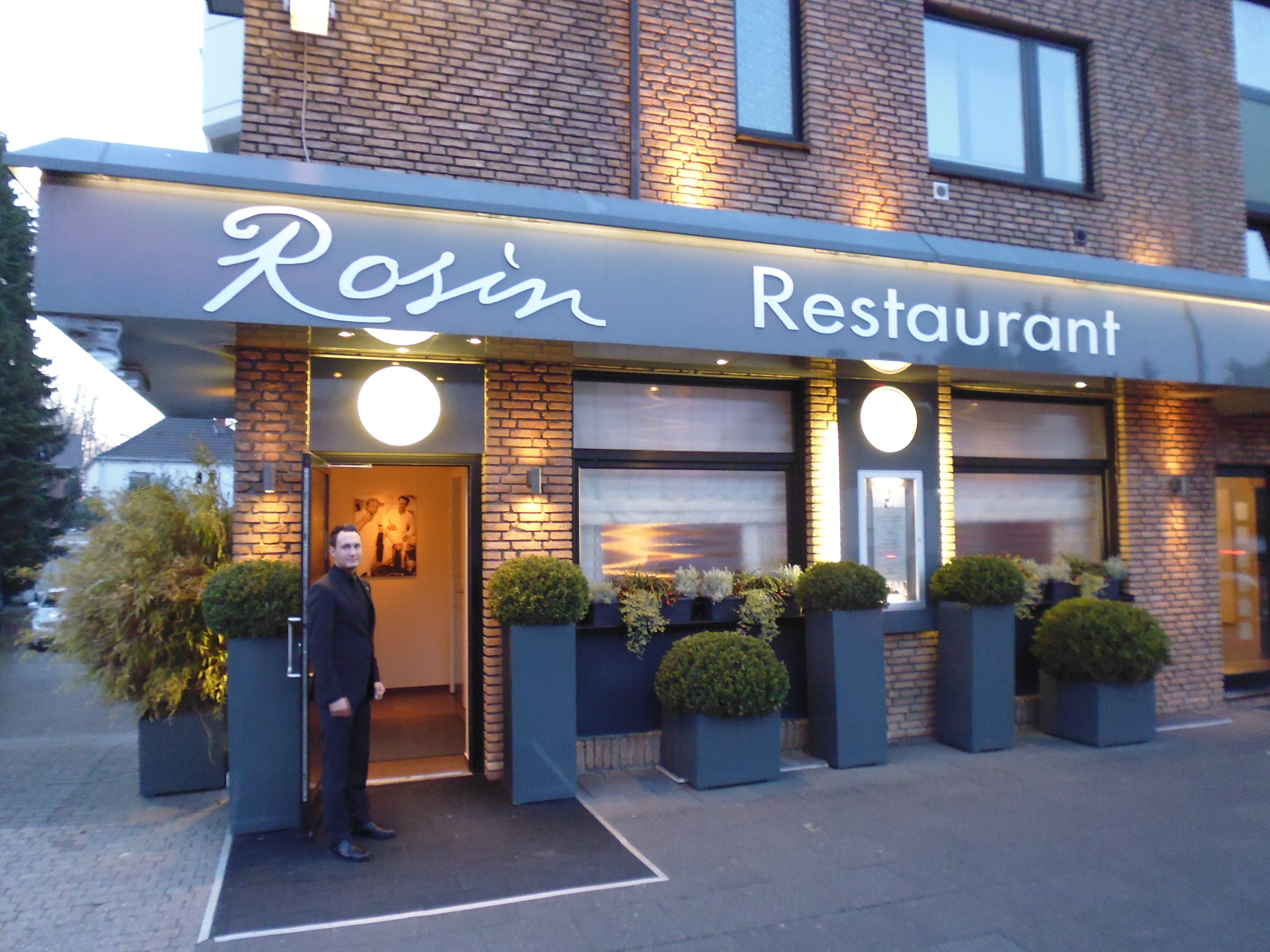
Rosins Restaurant in Dorsten

Rosin was born in Dorsten in 1966. His father was a wholesaler of catering supplies, while his mother had a snack stand. Rosin was working at his fathers business early on in his life. He completed his education from 1982 to 1985 as a cook in the hotel Monopol in Gelsenkirchen-Buer as well as in the restaurant Kaiserau in Gelsenkirchen-Erle under Harald Schroer. Afterwards he travelled and worked a year as an apprentice in California and Spain. His first time working as sous-Chef was on board of the Sea Cloud, a four-masted sailing ship for luxury cruises.

In spring of 1991 Rosin opened up his first restaurant Rosin at the location of the previous Café in Dorsten-Wulfen. In the summer 2009 the restaurant was awarded for best restaurant of the year by the magazine Der Feinschmecker (German for The Gourmet). The restaurant, lead together with Oliver Engelke as second headchef, got its second Michelinstar in November 2011. In April 2023 it lost one of its Michelinstars.

Rosin is member of the cooking association Junge Wilden (Young Wild Ones). His kitchen is commonly described as regionally influenced, creative gourmet cuisine. Besides his restaurant, Rosin also looked after the VIP area of FC Schalke 04. He became member of the supervisory board of the former Bundesliga club SG Wattenscheid 09, which he left after a short while.

In summer of 2024 he became namesake and gastronomic advisor of the Hard-Rock Restaurant in the newly opened hoteltower in Hamburgs Heiliggeistfeld-Bunker in Hamburg-St. Pauli.

== Celebrity Chef ==
In 1996, at the age of 30, he was first seen on WDR television as part of a cooking show. Since 2008, he has been active in television and appeared, among other shows, on the reality TV cooking competition Fast Food Duell. Furthermore, he is the protagonist of the coaching format Rosins Restaurants – Ein Sternekoch räumt auf! (Rosins Restaurants - A top chef tidies up!), which airs on Kabel Eins. In the ZDF show Topfgeldjäger (with a pun in German: bounty pan hunter), hosted by Steffen Henssler, he served as a permanent judge from August 2010 to August 2013. Additionally, Rosin was a coach and judge on the Sat.1 cooking casting show The Taste from 2013 to 2024. In 2014, he hosted Hell’s Kitchen on Sat.1, where celebrities competed against each other. In 2017, he worked as a voice actor for the animated film Storks – Adventures in Flight. In 2022, Rosin appeared with his own new show titled Rosins Heldenküche (Rosins Herokitchen) on Kabel Eins. Since 2023, together with Alexander Kumptner and Ali Güngörmüş, he has been featured in the Kabel Eins series Roadtrip Amerika – Drei Spitzenköche auf vier Rädern (Roadtrip America - Three top chefs on four wheels), where they travel across America in multiple episodes. They explore American cuisine as well as various American cultural quirks from a European perspective.

== Critique ==
In episode six of the television show Wer kocht das Beste für die Gäste? (Who cooks best for the guests?), Rosin cooked live crayfish, which led to a complaint by the German Animal Welfare Federation for animal cruelty.

== Private Life ==
Rosin has two daughters and a son, and was married from 2006 to 2019. He is a fan of FC Schalke 04 and is affectionately called "Rose" in the fan community.

== Distinction ==
- 2 Stars in the Guide Michelin (until 2022)
- 18 Points in Gault Millau
- 4 Points in Der Feinschmecker (The Gourmet, a magazine about cuisine)

== Literature (selection) ==
- Kindersley, Dorling (2016) Modern German Cookbook. ISBN 3-8310-3158-4.

== TV Series (selection) ==
- since 2009: Rosins Restaurants, Kabel eins
- 2010–2013: Topfgeldjäger (bounty pan hunter), ZDF
- since 2013: The Taste, Sat.1
- 2014: Hell’s Kitchen, Sat.1
- 2023: Roadtrip Amerika – Drei Spitzenköche auf vier Rädern (Roadtrip America - Three top chefs on four wheels), Kabel eins
- 2024: Roadtrip Amerika 2 – Drei Spitzenköche auf vier Rädern (Roadtrip America 2 - Three top chefs on four wheels), Kabel eins
- 2024: Wer kocht das Beste für die Gäste (Who cooks best for the guest?), Sat.1 (Kochduell bekannter Köche gegen Rosin)

== Discography ==
Alben

- 2014: One (als Soul Seeds by Frank Rosin; Erstveröffentlichung: 10. Oktober 2014)

Singles

- 2014: Sounds Like a Feeling (mit Matt Heanes)
- 2019: Belly Ciao (mit Eko Fresh)
