= Bywaters =

Bywaters is a surname in the English language. People whose family name is or was Bywaters include:

- Frederick Bywaters (1902–1923), British man executed for murder
- Eric Bywaters (1910–2003), British physician
- Gabe Bywaters (died 2004), Australian politician
- Jerry Bywaters (1906–1989), American artist, university professor, museum director, art critic and historian
- Stella Bywaters (1919–2009), Australian brigadier in the Salvation Army
- Zakiya Bywaters (born 1991), American professional soccer

== See also ==
- Bywaters' syndrome or Crush syndrome, named for Eric Bywaters
