= Bywater (surname) =

- Pronunciation: baɪ.wɔːtər

Origin
- Language: Old English
- Meaning: by the water
- Region of origin: Yorkshire

Bywater /ˈbaɪwɔːtər/ is an uncommon English surname of Old English origin and can most frequently be found in the English region of Yorkshire. It is a topographical surname given to those who were situated near a body of water.

== Etymology ==
Bywater is an uncommon surname of Old English origin. It is a topographical surname given to those who were situated near a body of water. The name derives from the merger of the Old English words bi (Middle English: by) and waeter (Middle English: water) to form biwaeter.

Topographical surnames are among the earliest created, because natural and artificial features in the landscape provided easily identifiable and distinguishing names among small communities in medieval England.

== History ==
The surname was first recorded by Thomas Bithewater, a witness to a wedding which dates to 1219, in the Yorkshire Assize Rolls.

It was first recorded in Middle English at the marriage of John Bywater and Eleonar Copgood at St Martin-in-the-Fields on 19 September 1637.

== People ==
- Hector Charles Bywater, English naval expert, author and WWI spy
- Hetti Bywater, British actress
- Ingram Bywater, English classical scholar
- Jim Bywater, British actor
- Michael Bywater, English writer
- Richard Arthur Samuel Bywater, recipient of the George Cross
- Ron Bywater, Australian rules footballer
- Stephen Bywater, English footballer
- Terry Bywater, British Paralympic athlete in wheelchair basketball
