= Léa Linster =

Luxembourgian chef

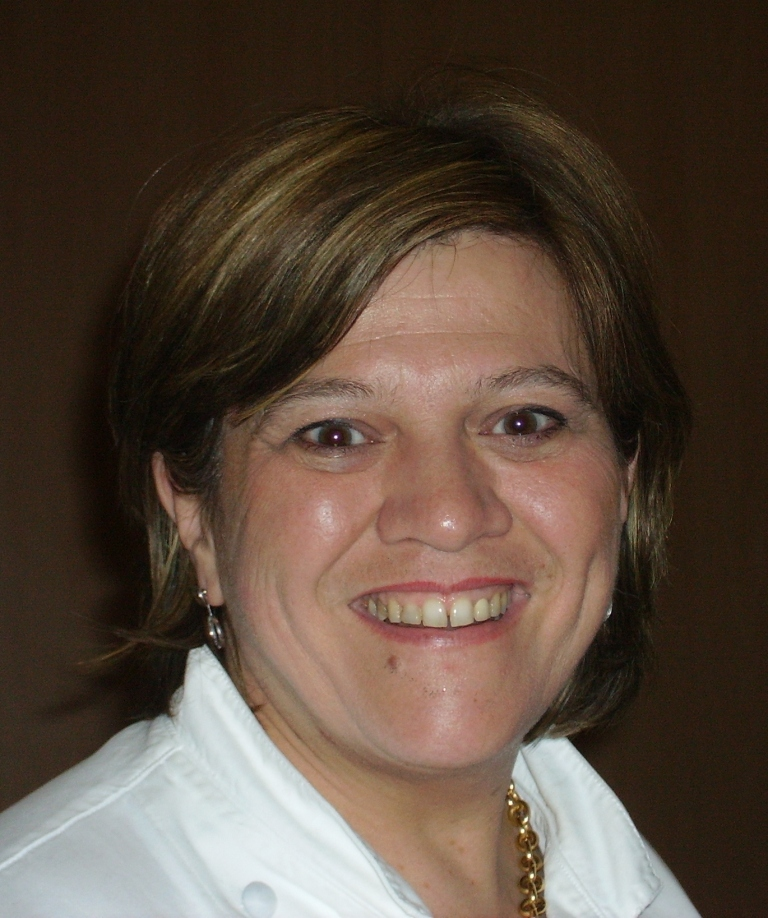
- Linster in 2007
- Born: 27 April 1955 (age 71); Differdange, Luxembourg
- Occupation: Chef
- Website: lealinster.lu

Léa Linster (born 27 April 1955) is a Luxembourgish chef, and a gold medal winner of the 1989 Bocuse d'Or, the first and to date only woman to accomplish this.

Having received a Michelin star in 1987, Linster owns the restaurants Restaurant Léa Linster, Au Quai de la Gare and Kaschthaus, and has been named Maître Cuisinier of Luxembourg, awarded the Gastronomic Golden Key from Gault et Millau in 1996 and the Michele Schumacher Award in 2002.

She appeared in the Saarbrücken edition of the TV series Tatort in 2006 and in the episodes Aus der Traum and Der Tote vom Straßenrand as Linde-Wirtin in 2007. In January and February 2011, she was responsible for the menus served in Lufthansa first and business class.

Léa Linster has a son.

== Bibliography ==
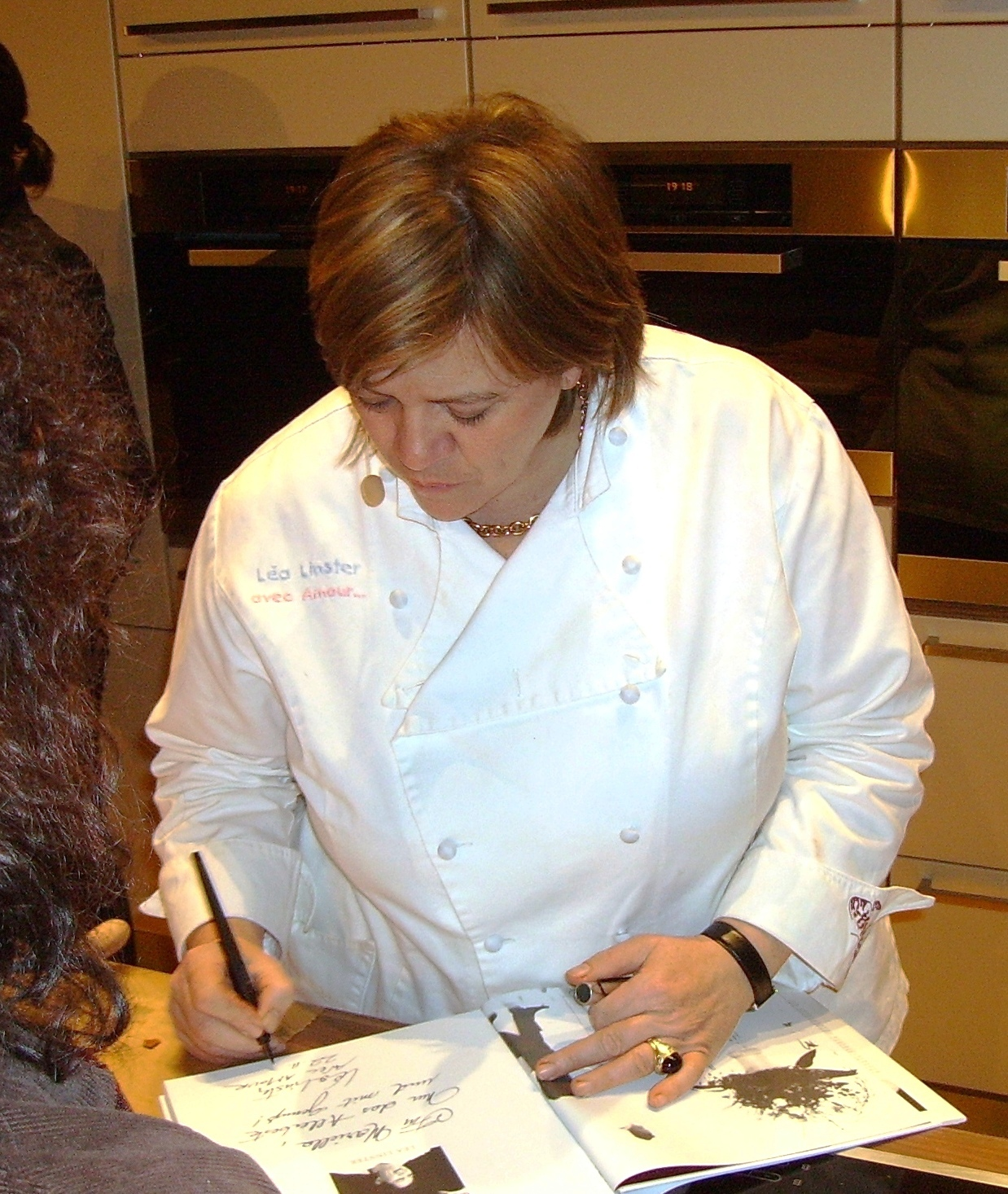
Léa Linster signing books at the trade fair "Lust auf Genuß" in Stuttgart, Germany

- Einfach und genial. Die Rezepte der Spitzenköchin Lea Linster, 2002
- Best of Léa Linster Cuisinière, 2003
- Rundum genial! Neue Rezepte der Spitzenköchin Lea Linster, 2005
- Kochbuch Lea Linster - Cuisinière, 2006
- Kochen mit Liebe: neue Rezepte der Spitzenköchin Lea Linster, 2007

== Awards (selection) ==
- 1983: Grand Prix Mandarine Napoléon
- 1987: First Michelin star
- 1987: Maître cuisinier of Luxembourg
- 1989: Bocuse d'Or
- 1989: Trophée Europe
- 1996: Gastronomic Golden Key from Gault et Millau
- 2002: Michele Schumacher Award
- 2007: Fondation du Mérite Européen
