= Tim Mälzer =

German television chef, restaurateur, cookbook author and television presenter

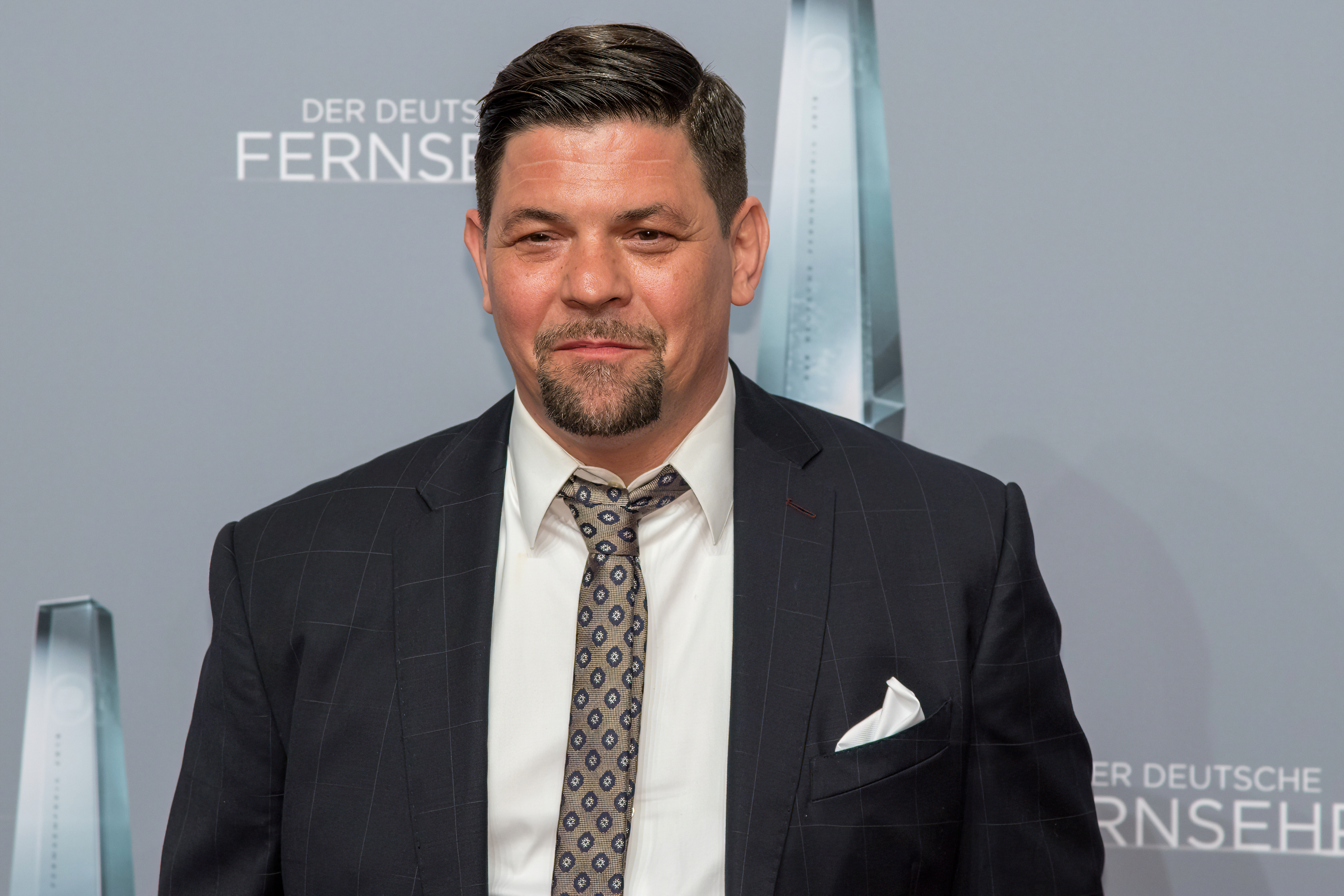
- Mälzer in 2018
- Born: Tim Mälzer; 22 January 1971 (age 54); Elmshorn, Schleswig-Holstein, West Germany
- Education: Johannes-Brahms-Schule
- Culinary career
- Current restaurant(s): Bullerei; Die gute Botschaft; Hausmann's
- Website: tim-maelzer.de

Tim Mälzer (born 22 January 1971 in Elmshorn, Schleswig-Holstein) is a German television chef, restaurateur, cookbook author and television presenter.

== Biography ==
Mälzer was born in 1971 in Elmshorn, Schleswig-Holstein, the son of a salesman. After graduating with an Abitur from the Johannes-Brahms-Schule in Pinneberg in 1990, Mälzer completed his alternative civil service in the district hospital of Pinneberg, and then trained as a cook at the Hotel InterContinental in Hamburg from 1992 to 1995. He then worked as a chef at the Ritz Hotel in London from 1995. After subsequent jobs, he worked in the Covent Garden Neal Street Restaurant of Antonio Carluccio under mentor Gennaro Contaldo, where at the same time the then-unknown chef Jamie Oliver was employed. Mälzer and Oliver remain friends.

After his return to Germany in 1997, he worked in the Hamburg restaurants Michelin-starred Tafelhaus (Christian Rach), Café Engel and Au Quai. With Christian Senkel as a partner, he took over Das Weißes Haus at the historical harbour in Övelgönne in August 2002, which he left in May 2007. At the end of April 2006, Mälzer also leased the Oberhafenkantine in Hamburg; the restaurant was operated by his mother until the end of 2007 and now has a different tenant. With Patrick Rüther as a partner, he opened the Bullerei restaurant in Hamburg's Schanzenviertel in June 2009, as well as a chain of Hausmann's restaurants in Frankfurt Airport (December 2012), Düsseldorf's Altstadt (June 2015, now closed), and in Düsseldorf Airport. In November 2016, he opened the restaurant Die gute Botschaft (en: The Good News) on the banks of the Alster in Hamburg (now closed). Mälzer is a consultant to the editorial staff of the magazine Essen & Trinken für jeden Tag (en: Food & Drink for Everyday), of which he is also an advertising partner.

Mälzer voiced sous-chef Horst in the German-dubbed version of the 2007 Pixar animated film Ratatouille.

In 2010, he became an ambassador for the German Maritime Search and Rescue Service. Mälzer has also been involved in education through his work with the DO School, formerly the D&F Academy, in 2011. Mälzer worked with a group of aspiring social entrepreneurs aged 18 to 28 to produce a multimedia-platform to inspire and inform people around the world about food and ingredients and inspire them to cook. Mälzer remains involved in the capacity of an advisor to the school.

During the COVID-19 pandemic in 2020, he organized a demonstration at the Hamburg city hall square to draw attention to the plight of the severely affected catering industry due to curfew restrictions.

=== Television Chef ===
Mälzer is a regular star, presenter, or guest of various German television cooking programmes since 2003.

From December 2003 onwards, Mälzer presented the cooking show Schmeckt nicht, gibt's nicht on VOX, which earned him his first nominations for the German Television Award in 2004 and 2007. The show ran there weekdays until August 2007, when Mälzer switched to the station's evening program, where he hosted the show Born to Cook until September 2007. Starting in December 2004 Mälzer also appeared frequently on the ZDF program Kochen bei Kerner, which was broadcast weekly on Friday evenings. Mälzer's popularity as a TV chef also boosted sales of the cookbooks he wrote, Born to Cook and Born to Cook 2. In 2006 he published the magazine Neues vom Küchenbullen, of which part of the proceeds went to finance World Vision projects. After a break required for burnout syndrome, Mälzer performed in front of an audience in 2007 in his stage show Ham’ se noch Hack. In addition, he has been a frequent guest on the VOX show Die Kocharena since the end of 2007. From April 2009 until 2014 he presented the weekly broadcast Tim Mälzer kocht! (en: Tim Mälzer cooks!) on Das Erste. From 2013 to 2015 he was coach and juror on the Sat.1 cooking talent show The Taste.

Since February 2016 he has been on air in all but three episodes of the VOX cooking duel show Kitchen Impossible, which was awarded the German Television Prize in 2017 and 2018 in the category "Best Factual Entertainment".

Since November 2019 he has hosted the cooking competition show Ready to beef! on VOX, while friend and Michelin-starred chef Tim Raue judges the dishes.

In October he starred in the documentary "Zum Schwarzwälder Hirsch" where he coached a team of persons with Down syndrome to open and run a restaurant.

== Podcast ==
Since April 2019 Mälzer is the co-host of the food and interview podcast "Fiete Gastro" together with the moderator Sebastian Merget. In 2019 it was awarded with the prestigious Goldene Blogger award.

== Works ==
- Born to Cook. Mosaik bei Goldmann, Munich 2004, ISBN 3-442-39079-6.
- Born to Cook 2. Mosaik, Munich 2005, ISBN 3-442-39087-7.
- Neues vom Küchenbullen (en: News from the Kitchen Bulls). Cora, Hamburg 2006, ISBN 3-89941-372-5.
- Kochbuch (en: Cookbook). (en: Mosaik, Munich 2007, ISBN 978-3-442-39124-0.
- Mälzer & Witzigmann. Zwei Köche – ein Buch (en: Two Cooks – One Book). (with Eckart Witzigmann) Mosaik, Munich 2010, ISBN 978-3-442-39195-0.
- Greenbox. Tim Mälzers grüne Küche (en: Tim Mälzer's Green Cuisine). Mosaik, Munich 2012, ISBN 978-3-442-39243-8.
- Heimat (en: Home or Homeland). Mosaik, Munich 2014, ISBN 978-3-442-39274-2.
- Die Küche (en: The Kitchen or The Cuisine). Mosaik, München 2016, ISBN 978-3-442-39304-6.
- Neue Heimat (en: New Home or New Homeland). Mosaik, München 2018, ISBN 978-34-423-9338-1.
