= Tim Raue =

German chef (born 1974)

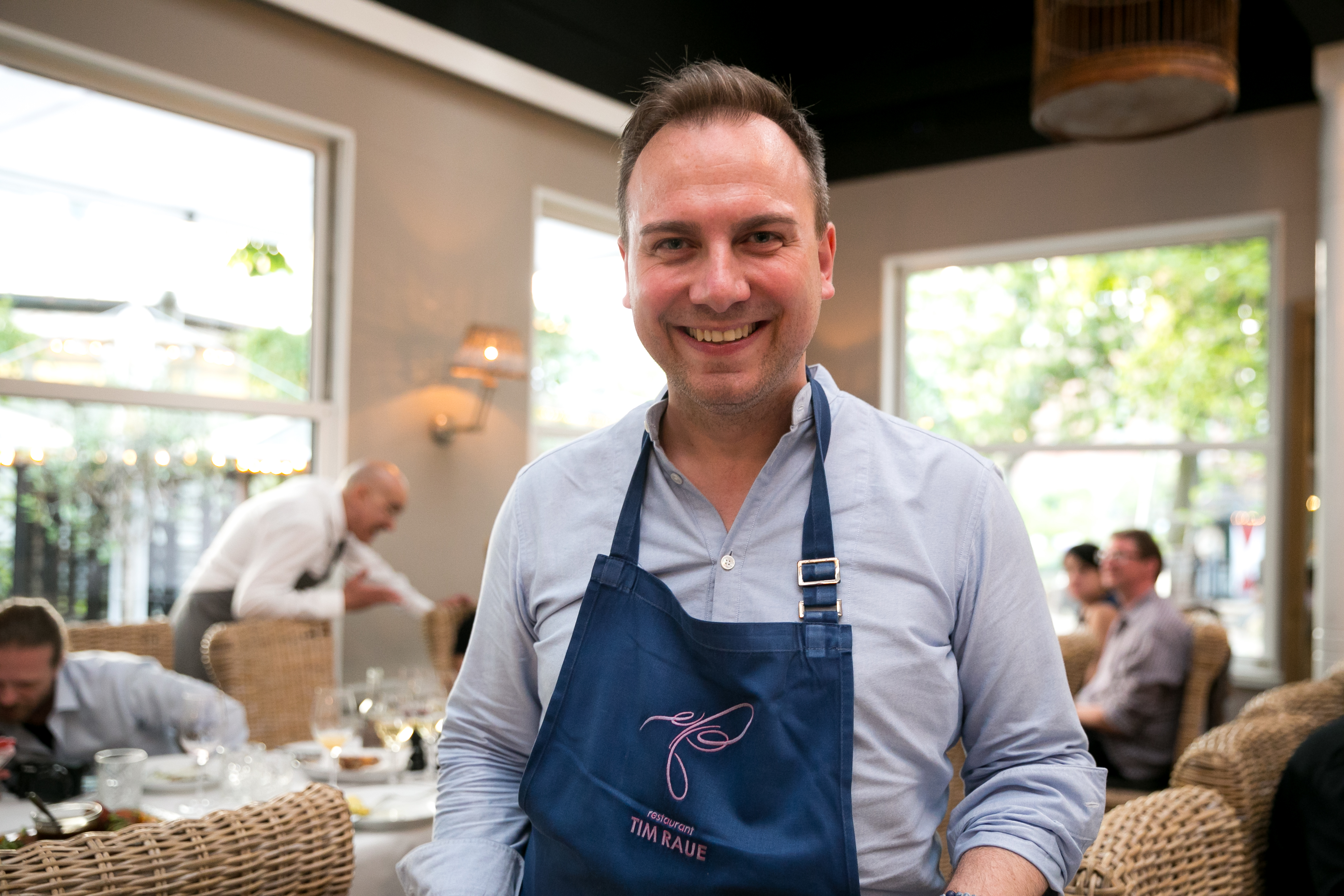
- Tim Raue, 2016 in Copenhagen
- Born: March 31, 1974 (age 52); West Berlin, West Germany
- Education: Apprenticeship
- Culinary career
- Cooking style: Asian
- Ratings: Michelin stars; Gault Millau (19/20)
- Current restaurants: Tim Raue; La Soupe Populaire closed for renovations; Brasserie Colette in Munich
- Previous restaurants: 44; MA Tim Raue

Tim Raue (born 31 March 1974) is a German chef. He is currently head chef at Tim Raue, a Michelin two-star restaurant in Berlin.

== Biography ==
Tim Raue grew up in modest circumstances in the Kreuzberg Wrangel neighbourhood in West Berlin. He met his first wife Marie-Anne during the second year of his apprenticeship in the Chalet Suisse restaurant in the Grunewald district. This was followed by positions in First Floor and, at just 23 years of age, as chef de cuisine in Rosenbaum (which no longer exists) in the corner house on the Oderberger Straße and, subsequently, again chef de cuisine in the Kaiserstuben. In 1998, he was nominated Newcomer of the Year (Der Feinschmecker).

In 2002, he moved to Restaurant 44 in the Berlin Swissôtel, with his wife as restaurant manager. In 2007, he was chosen as Chef of the Year by Gault-Millau, and his kitchen in 44 was awarded one Michelin star and 18 points in Gault-Millau. In 2008 he published a cookbook with the title Aromen(r)evolution (Aroma (R)evolution). In the same year he became culinary director of the Adlon Collection, part of the Fundus Group, consisting of five restaurants in the hotel at the eastern end of Pariser Platz near the Brandenburg Gate. There he opened the Ma Tim Raue (Chinese inspired cuisine), Uma (Japanese inspired) and the adjacent Shochu Bar. Only a few months later the Ma Tim Raue was awarded a Michelin star. Gault Millau awarded Ma Tim Raue 18 points and the Uma 17 points. As the restaurants were making a loss, Ma Tim Raue was closed in July 2010. The Uma continued under the direction of Stephan Zuber, who was chef de cuisine there from September 2009. In 2013 it was replaced by the Sra Bua by Tim Raue. After six years of culinary and strategic direction of Sra Bua, Tim Raue relinquished the reins and ended the constructive collaboration from 1 January 2019. The Panasian cuisine will however be continued.

In September 2010 Tim Raue opened his new restaurant Tim Raue in the Rudi-Dutschke-Straße in Berlin-Kreuzberg. In the same year he was a member of the jury on the TV programme Deutschlands Meisterkoch (Germany’s Master Chef). Since December 2011, he does advertising for a weight-reducing company. In 2012, Restaurant Tim Raue was awarded two stars by Guide Michelin.

On 16 May 2013, Tim Raue, who also owns the Studio tim raue and runs Sra Bua by Tim Raue, opened the La Soupe Populaire Canteen (Soup for All) as his third restaurant in Berlin. It is located in the former Bötzow Brewery on Prenzlauer Allee. In 2013, Guide Michelin awarded La Soupe Populaire a Bib Gourmand, and it also received 13 points from Gault-Millau.

In April 2014, the Tim Raue restaurant was listed for the first time in the British restaurant magazine The World's 50 Best Restaurants at place 78; in 2016 it had reached place 34 and was at place 37 in 2018. In 2016 and 2017 Tim took part in the VOX TV cookery show Kitchen Impossible, and substituted for Tim Mälzer in the RTL show Wer wird Millionär? (Who wants to be a Millionaire). In the third season of the Netflix series Chef’s Table, one episode is devoted to Tim Raue and his development as a chef.

In 2019 a further culinary venture is planned in the neighbouring city of Potsdam, capital of the State of Brandenburg. In addition to his restaurant in Berlin, his Brasserie concept in Berlin, Constance and Munich, and the culinary direction of the Dragonfly in Dubai, Tim is also active on the North Sea island of Sylt with his Spices by Tim Raue in the exclusive A-Rosa holiday resort. In addition, since the winter season 2017–18, with the opening of the pop-up restaurant K by Tim Raue, he has collaborated with the 5-star superior Kulm Hotel in St Moritz. The K by Tim Raue was recently awarded 17 GaultMillau points and a Michelin star.

In 2016 he announced his separation from Marie-Anne Raue. In July 2017, he married Katharina Wolschner, Editor-in-Chief of the specialist journal Rolling Pin.
