= Charles Tjessem =

Norwegian chef

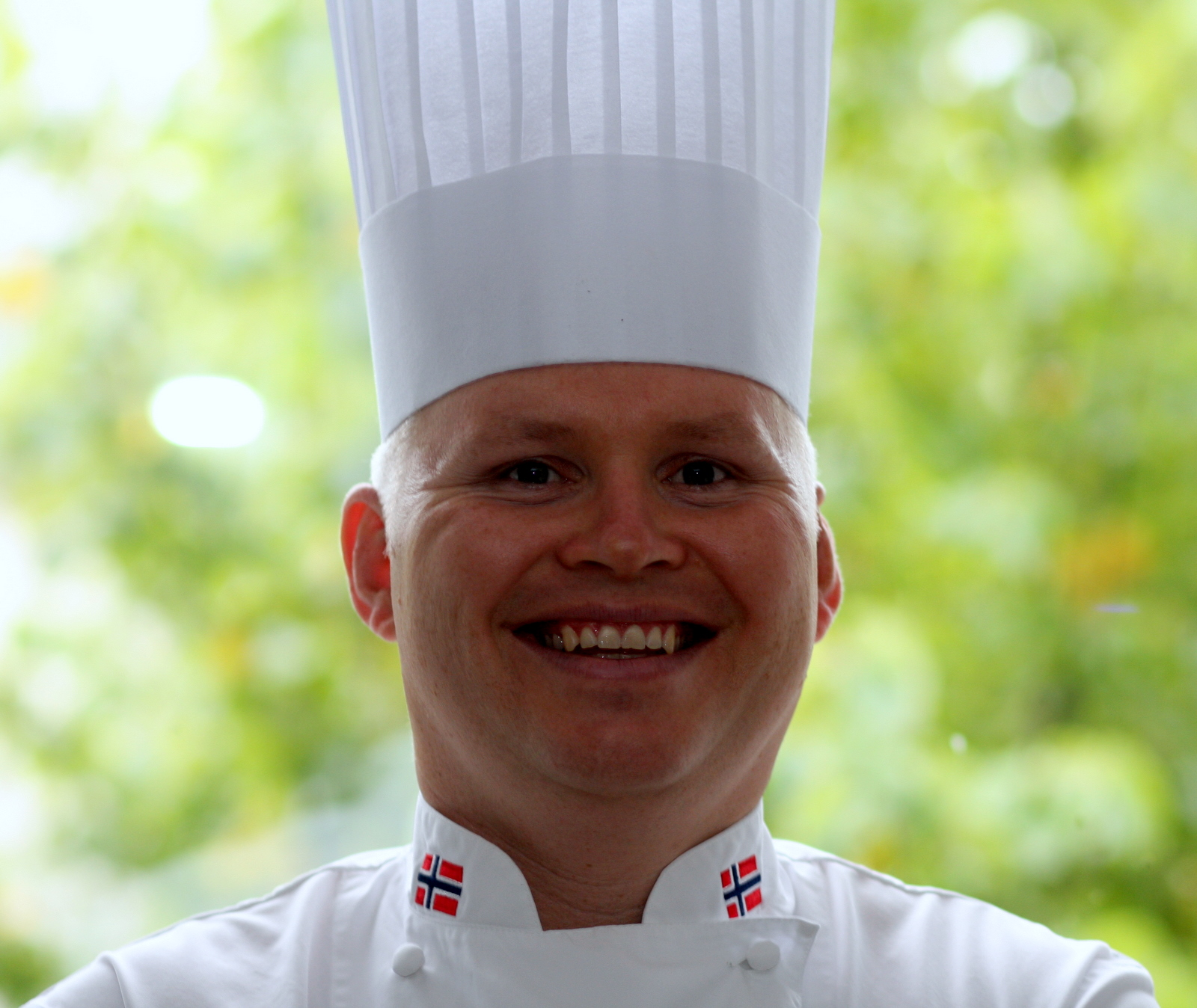
Charles Tjessem, 2009

Charles Tjessem (born 5 May 1971, in Sandnes) is a Norwegian chef, and winner of the 2003 Bocuse d'Or. The victory was achieved over the French chef Frank Putelat by the smallest margin of points to date in the competition.

Tjessem is currently a chef and owner of the restaurant Charles & De in Sandnes. He was coached for the Bocuse d'Or by Odd Ivar Solvold, and had previously trained under Bent Stiansen, and Eyvind Hellstrøm during two years at Bagatelle, worked as a daily manager for Gastronomisk Institutt in Stavanger, as a chef for the petroleum company Statoil, and was captain of the Norwegian national chef team in the period 2000 to 2004. Tjessem ended his competitive career with parting criticism aimed at the arrangers of the International Exhibition of Culinary Art.

Tjessem published the book Rett skal være rett in 2006.
