= Tom Victor Gausdal =

Norwegian chef

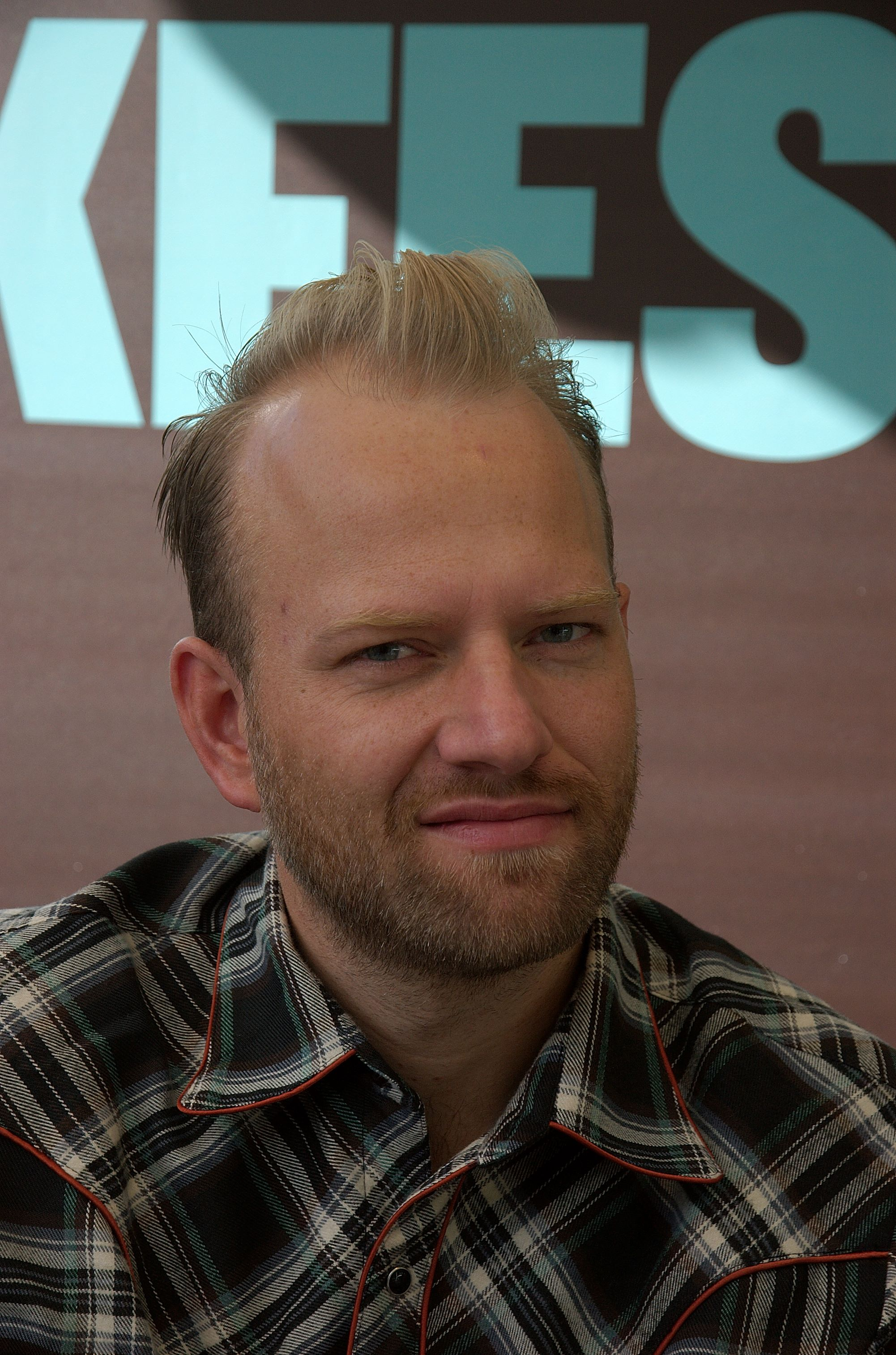
Tom Victor Gausdal

Tom Victor Gausdal (born 1976, Nøtterøy) is a Norwegian chef, and silver medalist of the 2005 Bocuse d'Or. The margin separating Gausdal from gold medal winner Serge Vieira was one point. Gausdal had a period of apprenticeship at Statholdergaarden under Bent Stiansen and was from 1997 to 2008 a member of the Norwegian national chef team. Intent since childhood on a culinary profession, Gausdal considered for a while on becoming a pastry chef.

Among Gausdal's book publications are Husmannskost (2005) and several collaborations with chef and sommelier Ole Martin Alfsen, including Mat og drikke (2007), Mer (2008) and Familiekokeboka (2009). Gaustad is also a syndicated newspaper columnist, often with Alfsen.

In 2010, Gausdal joined Eyvind Hellstrøm and Jan Vardøen as judges on the Norwegian TV3 version of the cooking challenge TV program MasterChef.
