= Kari Innerå =

Norwegian gourmet chef

Kari Innerå (born 14 April 1982 in Harstad) is a Norwegian gourmet chef who has won the Nordic Culinary Championships and the Culinary Olympics. Innerå is known for her restaurant Cru vin & kjøkken which she established in 2008 together with investor, former Olympic cross country ski champion Thomas Alsgaard. When she was headhunted to establish the gourmet restaurant Fru K at The Thief in Oslo, Innerå was simultaneously introduced to a wider audience nationally and internationally.

== Career ==
At the age of 20, Innerå moved to London to apprentice under chef Marco Pierre White at the venerable gourmet restaurant Mirabelle (London restaurant) in London. She later worked at the Culinary Institute in Stavanger and Bagatelle in Oslo, and won gold in the Culinary Olympics in Erfurt with the Norwegian Culinary Team in 2008 and started her own "Cru vin & kjøkken" restaurant the same year.

== Restaurant ==
Along with Thomas Alsgaard, wine connoisseur Merete Bø and noted chef Terje Ness she opened the gourmet restaurant "Cru vin & kjøkken" in October 2008. The inspiration was taken from Willy's Wine Bar in Paris, and the wine cellar is one of Oslo's most extensive with over 1000 wines available. The award-winning restaurant focuses on local food, and grow their own fruit and vegetables in an allotment close to the city centre.

== Wine theft ==
On the morning of 2 May 2011, thieves broke into Cru vine & kjøkken and stole 100 bottles of expensive wine and champagne worth US$40,000–50,000, including a Romanée-Conti, La Tâche Grand Cru 1972 and top wines from Château d'Yquem, Liger-Belair, Jacques Selosse and Dom Pérignon. Because some of the wines were absolutely irreplaceable, owner and chef Kari Innerå announced a bounty of US$10,000 for those who could contribute to the clarification of the robbery. The robbery was never solved.

== Awards and merits ==
- Culinary Olympics in Erfurt
  - On the national team in 2008, when Norway won gold.
  - On the national team, as the sole girl, in 2004 when Norway won bronze.
- National Culinary Team
  - On the team from 2005 to 2008
- Nordic Culinary Championship
  - Gold in 2007
- National Culinary Championship
  - Silver in 2007, when she worked at the Bagatelle
  - Bronze in 2005, when she worked at the Culinary Institute
  - 6th place in 2004, when she worked at the Culinary Institute
- The Hulda Award (Norwegian female chef of the year)
  - Gold in 2007 as a cook/chef de partie at Bagatelle
  - Silver in 2004
  - Silver in 2003
- Norwegian Youth Culinary Team, Culinary Olympics in Erfurt
  - Bronze in 2004
- Trophée Passion in Paris - international cooking competition with participants from 15 nations and a jury headed by top chef Pierre Gagnaire
  - Gold in 2006
