= Yasuji =

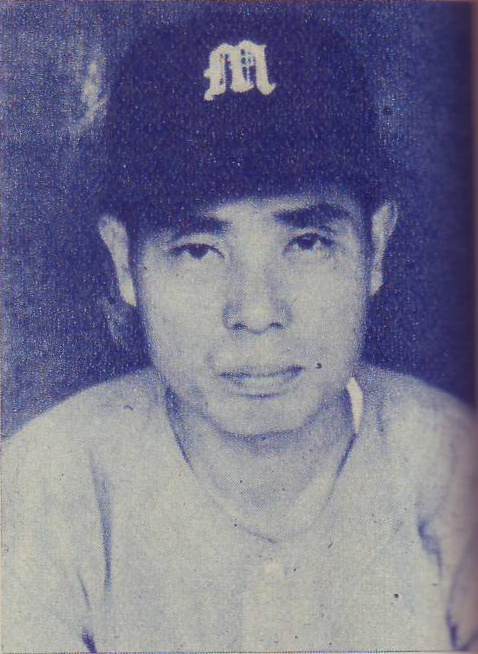
- Yasuji Hondo (1918–1997), Japanese baseball player and manager
- Pronunciation: jasɯdʑi (IPA)
- Gender: Male

Origin
- Origin: Japanese
- Meaning: Different meanings depending on the kanji used

Other names
- Alternative spelling: Yasuzi (Kunrei-shiki) Yasuzi (Nihon-shiki) Yasuji (Hepburn)

Yasuji is a masculine Japanese given name.

== Written forms ==
Yasuji can be written using different combinations of kanji characters. Here are some examples:

- 康二, "healthy, two"
- 康次, "healthy, next"
- 康治, "healthy, to manage"
- 康児, "healthy, child"
- 康爾, "healthy, you"
- 靖二, "peaceful, two"
- 靖次, "peaceful, next"
- 靖治, "peaceful, to manage"
- 靖児, "peaceful, child"
- 靖爾, "peaceful, you"
- 安二, "tranquil, two"
- 安次, "tranquil, next"
- 安治, "tranquil, to manage"
- 保二, "preserve, two"
- 保次, "preserve, next"
- 保児, "preserve, child"
- 泰二, "peaceful, two"
- 泰次, "peaceful, next"
- 泰治, "peaceful, to manage"
- 易児, "divination, child"
- 易慈, "divination, mercy"

The name can also be written in hiragana やすじ or katakana ヤスジ.

== Notable people with the name ==
- Yasuji Hondo (本堂 保次; 1918–1997), Japanese baseball player and manager
- Yasuji Honma (本間 康二; born 1943), Japanese rower
- Yasuji Kamada (鎌田 彌壽治; 1883–1977), Japanese photographer
- Yasuji Kaneko (金子 安次; born 1920), Japanese war criminal and activist
- Yasuji Kikuzuma (菊妻 康司; born 1978), Japanese weightlifter
- Yasuji Kiyose (清瀬 保二; 1900–1981), Japanese composer
- Yasuji Miyazaki (宮崎 康二; 1916–1989), Japanese swimmer
- Yasuji Mori (森 康二; 1925–1992), Japanese animator
- Yasuji Murata (村田 安司; 1896–1966), Japanese animator
- Yasuji Okamura (岡村 寧次; 1884–1966), Japanese general
- Yasuji Sasaki (佐々木 康二, born 1967), Japanese chef
