= Gunnar Hvarnes =

Norwegian chef (born 1977)

Gunnar Hvarnes (born 5 May 1977, Hvarnes near Larvik) is a Norwegian chef, and the country's delegate to participate in the 2010 Bocuse d'Or Europe and the 2011 Bocuse d'Or international finals, where he won the bronze medal.

Hvarnes has previously competed in culinary contests, achieving silver in the 2004 Norwegian national championship, and gold in 2006 and 2007. He was captain of the Norwegian national chef team that won gold in the 2006 world championship in Luxembourg and captain of the Norwegian team that won gold at the Culinary Olympics at Erfurt in 2008. As the winner of Norway's "chef of the year" in 2009, Hvarnes qualified as the Norwegian Bocuse d'Or Europe delegate. In the Bocuse d'Or Europe final in Geneva in June 2010, Hvarnes won the silver medal behind Rasmus Kofoed, qualifying for the Bocuse d'Or final in January 2011.

Hvarnes has a wide background of employment with various restaurants and hotels in Norway. He currently works as a culinary consultant at the Gastronomisk Institutt in Stavanger.
