= Morten Schakenda =

Norwegian cook (1966–2022)

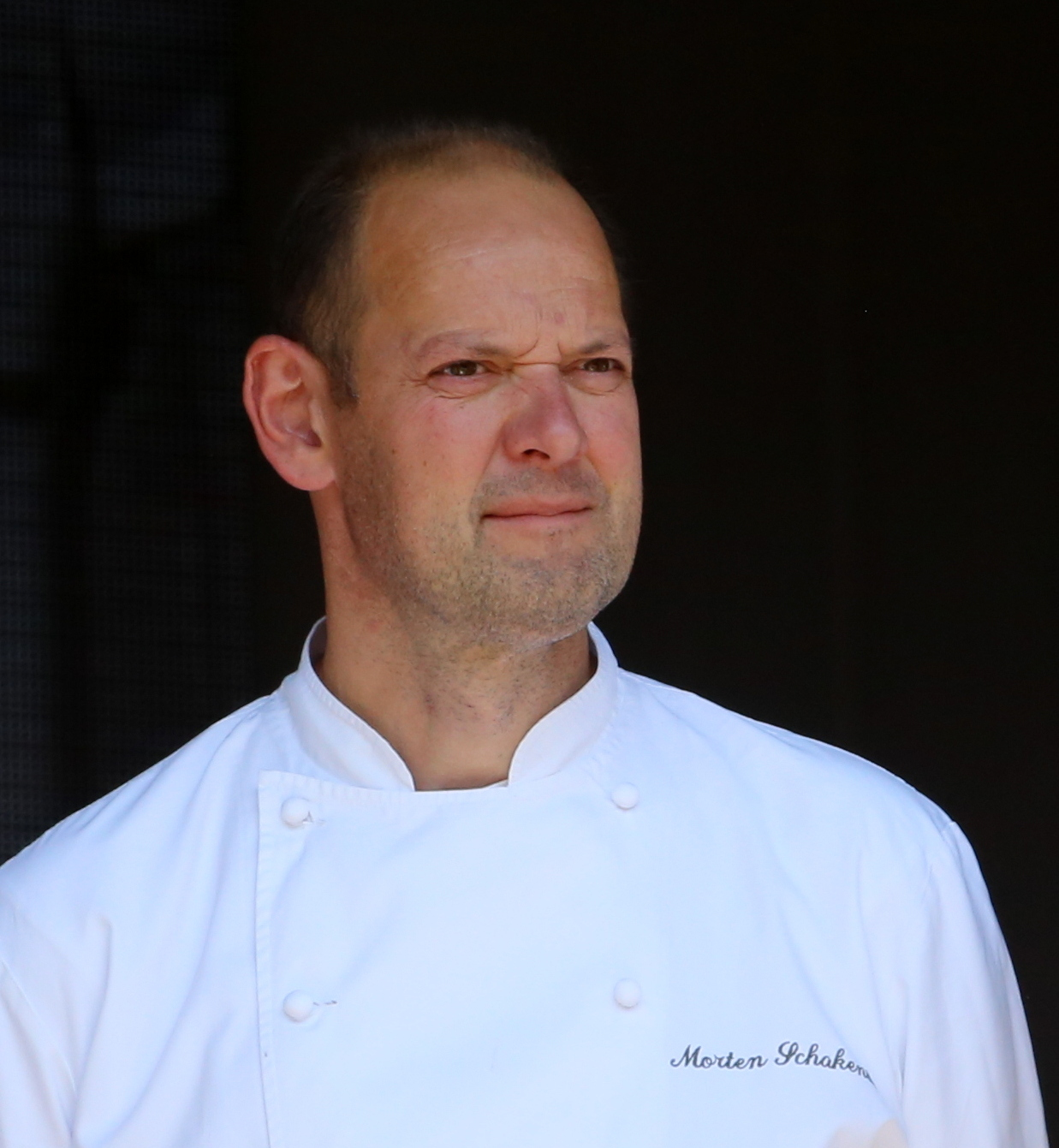
Schakenda at Gladmat 2014 in Stavanger

Morten Schakenda (7 June 1966 – 14 March 2022) was a Norwegian cook, known as one of the leading chefs in the country.

== Career ==
After working on the school ship Gann, he worked at Hotell Ulstein. Later, he was leader of the Gastronomisk institutt in Stavanger for eight years, and made his debut for the national cooking team (1997). He worked in Oslo restaurants such as Bagatelle, Jans Mat og Vinhus, Terra Restaurant, D'Artagnan and Holmenkollen Restaurant. After three years as the apprentice at Åpent Bakeri, he established a bakery in Lom Municipality (2004-). Schakenda had, along with Stein Mortensen and Charles Tjessem, written Med skjell på gaffelen (2004).
