= Serge Vieira =

French chef (1977–2023)

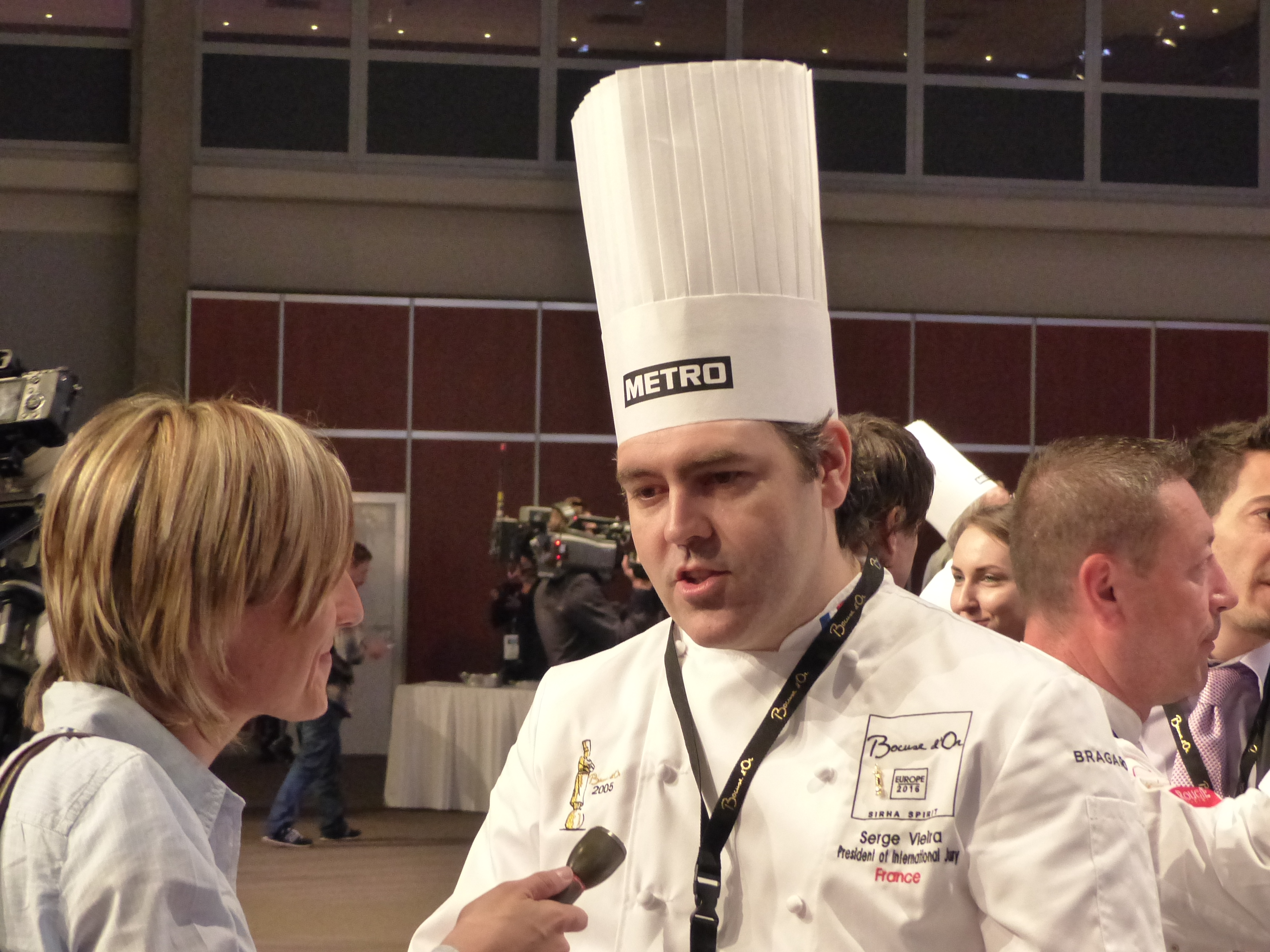
- Born: 4 April 1977; Clermont-Ferrand, France
- Died: 1 July 2023 (aged 46); Chaudes-Aigues, France
- Occupation: Chef
- Awards: Bocuse d'Or (2005) Ordre national du Mérite (2022)
- Website: https://www.sergevieira.com/fr/

Serge Vieira (4 April 1977 – 1 July 2023) was a French Michelin-starred chef of the restaurant bearing his name, Serge Vieira, located at Château de Couffour. He was winner of the 2005 Bocuse d'or.

== Biography ==
Serge Vieira was born in Clermont-Ferrand in 1977 to Portuguese parents João and Maria Irene Vieira. He is the youngest of five siblings, and his father works for Michelin.

Vieira obtained a CAP (French certificate for chefs) and then a BEP(secondary diploma), but was refused entry to the Lycée hôtelier in Chamalières. He then made his debut in Chamalières with chef Dominique Robert at La Gravière from 1993 until 1997. He then continued his training as chef de partie with chef Bernard Andrieu in Clermont-Ferrand (July 1997-May 1998), then at Château de Marçay in Chinon (May–November 1998). He followed this up with a series of three-star restaurants, starting with three years at Saint-Père-sous-Vézelay under chef Marc Meneau at L'Espérance as chef de partie from September 1999. Régis Marcon then took him on as second chef at L'Auberge des Cimes in Saint-Bonnet-le-Froid for three years, starting in March 2003.

=== Bocuse d'Or and two stars ===
In 2005, Vieira won the Bocuse d'Or, prepared with the help of Régis Marcon. From then on, he travelled the world for professional training courses and various performances. In 2009, he decided to settle in the Cantal region, and on 10 April opened a restaurant bearing his name at Château de Couffour in Chaudes-Aigues. It's a 40-seat troglodyte restaurant set below the château, with access through the roof. After just one year, it was awarded its first star, followed by a second in 2012.

Vieira's cuisine was characterised by the absence of signature dishes. For him, "The signature dish is a prison. I want people to come to us because they don't know what they're going to taste. Renewal is essential".

=== Opening of Sodade ===
In 2019, Vieira opened a second establishment, consisting of a four-star hotel and a 50-60 place brasserie restaurant named Sodade, recalling his Portuguese origins. He presided over the French Bocuse d'Or team. He also assisted and trained the Australian team for the Bocuse d'Or. He helped chef Davy Tissot win the Bocuse d'Or 2021. In January 2020, his restaurant Château de Couffour was awarded the sustainable gastronomy label.

=== Charity ===
Vieira organized the Tournament des étoilés, a soccer tournament in which almost 500 Michelin-starred chefs took part, with all proceeds going to the Les enfants du jardin association.

=== Personal life and death ===
Vieira met his future wife, Marie-Aude, at Château de Marçay. Marie-Aude Vieira is the daughter of goatherds and the couple had two children. In January 2020, Marie-Aude Vieira received a Service Award from the Michelin Guide.

Vieira died on 1 July 2023, at the age of 46.
