= Esben Holmboe Bang =

Danish-Norwegian chef (born 1982)

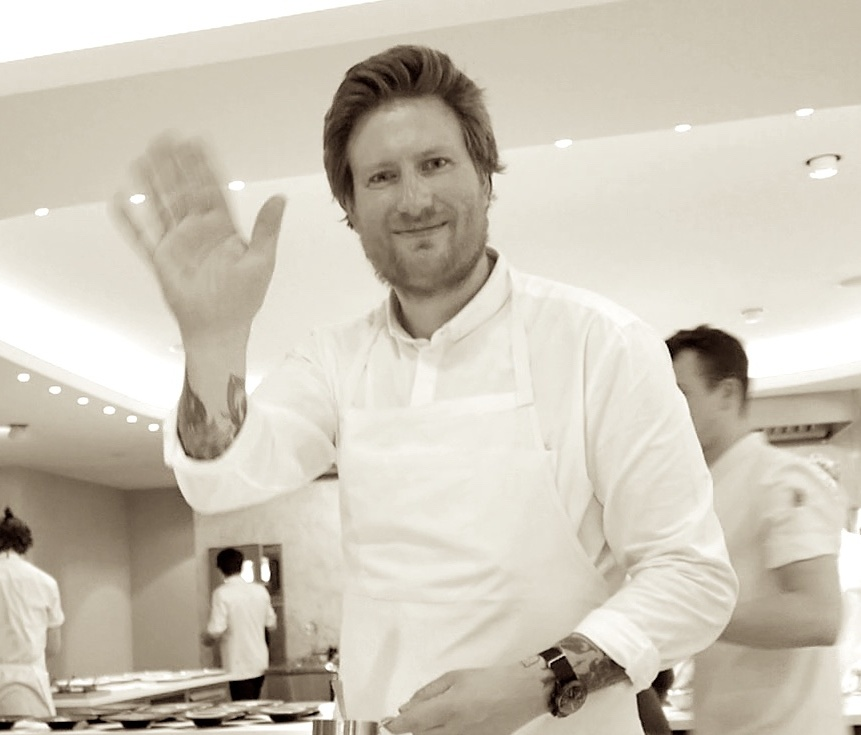
- Born: 19 July 1982 (age 43); Frederiksberg, Denmark
- Culinary career
- Cooking style: New Nordic Cuisine
- Rating: Michelin rating
- Current restaurant: Maaemo

Esben Holmboe Bang (born 19 July 1982) is a Danish chef and restaurateur. He is co-owner and head chef at the three Michelin star restaurant Maaemo in Oslo, Norway.

== History ==
Bang grew up in Frederiksberg, where both his parents were trained journalists. After their divorce, he moved to a hippie collective in Værløse. He dropped out of secondary school to begin training to be a chef. He started his apprenticeship at Schackenborg Slotskro in Møgeltønder. He became interested in gourmet food, and switched places to the gourmet restaurant Det 11. Bud in Copenhagen. After graduating, he worked for two years with the French chef Daniel Letz at Sankt Jakobs Plads in Østerbro. In 2001, he moved to Oslo after meeting a Norwegian woman whom he later married. Here he got a job at the restaurant Bagatelle, before two years later becoming deputy manager at Le Canard, which at this time had one star in the Michelin guide. From 2005 to 2006, Holmboe Bang was briefly back in Copenhagen when he was hired as a dessert chef at Jan Hurtigkarl & Co. In 2007, he returned to Oslo when he became deputy manager at the one-star Restaurant Oro, before from 2008 to 2010 he had a similar position at Feinschmecker, which also had one star in the Michelin guide.

== Maaemo ==
When Esben, together with Finnish sommelier Pontus Dahlström and John Frede wanted to make gourmet food from 100 percent organic local ingredients, they opened the restaurant Maaemo in December 2010, in Oslo's poor Grønland district in the eastern part of the city. In March 2012, Maaemo became the first restaurant in the Nordic region to receive two stars in the Michelin guide's first rating of the restaurant, and in February 2016, the restaurant received its third Michelin star. Together with Danish Restaurant Geranium, Maaemo became the first three-star restaurants in the Nordic region. In December 2019, the restaurant closed to move to another location. This resulted in the loss of all of its three Michelin stars in February 2020. In September 2021 Maaemo won back all three stars.
