= Terje Ness =

Norwegian chef (born 1968)

Terje Ness (born 7 April 1968) is a Norwegian chef.

He was born in Førde Municipality. His mother was a diet cook at the hospital in Førde. Ness was apprenticed at Sunnfjord Hotel in 1987, received a trade certificate at the age of 21 in 1989, was with Frode Aga at Hallingstuene in Geilo, and he was also in Hemsedal and Stavanger. He worked at Eyvind Hellstrøm's restaurant Bagatelle from 1994, and then ran his own restaurant Oro from 2000 to 2004. He is best known for winning the Bocuse d'Or in 1999. In 2015 he reopened Oro with his former Bagatelle team.
