= Stiansen =

Stiansen is a Norwegian surname. Notable people with the surname include:

- Bent Stiansen, Norwegian chef
- Jorun Stiansen, Norwegian former Idol winner
- Svein-Erik Stiansen, Norwegian speed skater
- Tom Stiansen, Norwegian former alpine skier
