= Roland Henin =

American chef

Roland G. Henin is an American chef, and the corporate chef and chief culinary ambassador for Delaware North Companies. He is one of approximately 60 certified master chefs in the U.S. and has been recognized as an accomplished chef, culinary teacher and cookbook contributor throughout his career. He coached Timothy Hollingsworth for the 2009 Bocuse d'Or in Lyon, France.

Henin mentored Thomas Keller. Keller helped select Henin to coach for the Bocuse d'Or.

Earlier in his career, Henin coached the 1992 gold medal U.S. Culinary Olympic Team. He also received the first-ever National Chef Professionalism Award ever granted by the American Culinary Federation. This success helped him to become the director of the Culinary Arts Department at the Art Institute of Seattle. He has also taught at the Culinary Institute of America and Johnson & Wales College of Culinary Arts.

At Delaware North, Henin oversees the company's culinary operations at national parks, sports stadiums and entertainment venues around the world. He helped the company develop its first-ever cookbook Pathways to Plate and its follow-up, Home Plate. In early 2008, the Jacobs family established a scholarship at the Culinary Institute of America in Henin's name that provides funding for future students who attend the school.

Henin coached five Delaware North chefs in the 2008 Culinary Olympics in Erfurt, Germany. All five chefs received distinction, with Ambarish Lulay and Scott Green earning silver medals and Kevin Doherty earning a bronze medal.

Before his tenure at Delaware North, Henin served as the executive chef at OSF International and Truitt Bros. in Oregon, as well as chef de cuisine at the five-star Breakers Hotel in Palm Beach, Florida.
