= Geir Skeie =

Norwegian chef and restaurateur

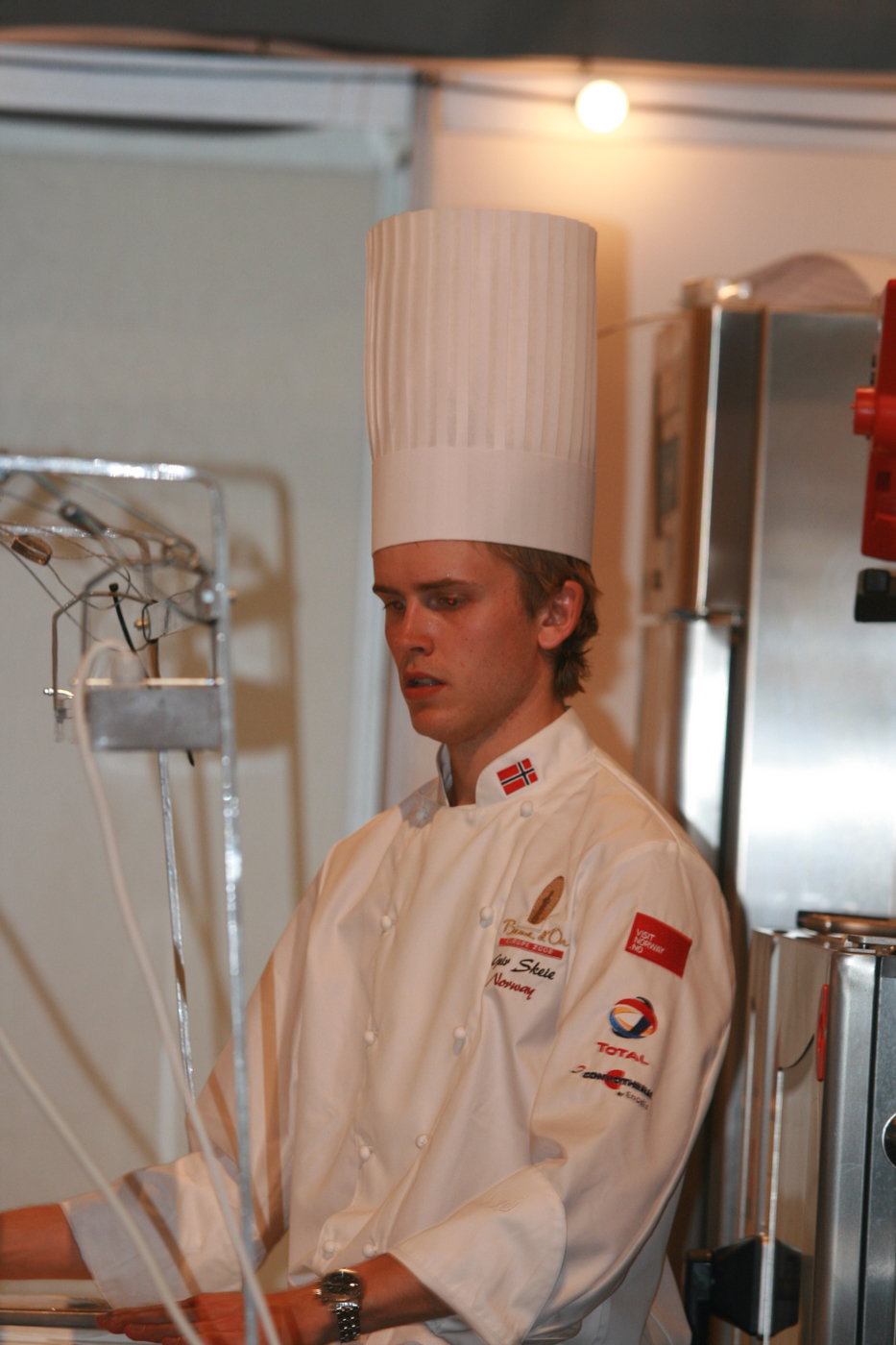
Geir Skeie at Bocuse d’Or 2008 in Stavanger.

Geir Skeie (born July 2, 1980, Fitjar Municipality) is a Norwegian chef and restaurateur, winner of the 2008 Bocuse d'Or Europe, and the 2009 Bocuse d'Or world final.

== Career ==
Skeie runs two restaurants, both called "Brygga 11", in Sandefjord and Leirvik (close to his home town of Fitjar). He has been chef de cuisine at Mathuset Midtåsen Solvold in Sandefjord, owned by 1997 Bocuse d'Or bronze medallist Odd Ivar Solvold, and has worked at restaurants Le Canard, Solsiden and Palace Grill in Oslo and at Skarsnuten hotel in Hemsedal Municipality.

Skeie made the decision to pursue the Bocuse d'Or in 1993 when watching Bent Stiansen appear on the television program of Ingrid Espelid Hovig having become the first Norwegian to win the contest, and subsequently worked towards this goal for fifteen years, spending the last two years perfecting the winning recipe. In contrast to his fellow candidates in the 2009 finals who had lodgings in Lyon for making last preparations, Skeie rented a large semi-trailer truck with an installed training kitchen. He was coached by previous bronze Bocuse d'Or medallist Odd Ivar Solvold and then assisted by commis Adrian Løvold, having used Ørjan Johannessen as commis when he won the 2008 Bocuse d'Or Europe.

After the contest, Skeie stated he was 90% satisfied with his performance. The gold medal was won with a score of 1020 points, a comfortable margin over Swedish silver medalist Jonas Lundgren, who scored 994 points.

== Personal life ==
Following a traffic accident that shattered his kneecap in 2006, Skeie has been told by doctors that a career as a chef will lead to early retirement while still in his 40s.
