= Garmo Church =

Church in Innlandet, Norway

- Garmo kirke
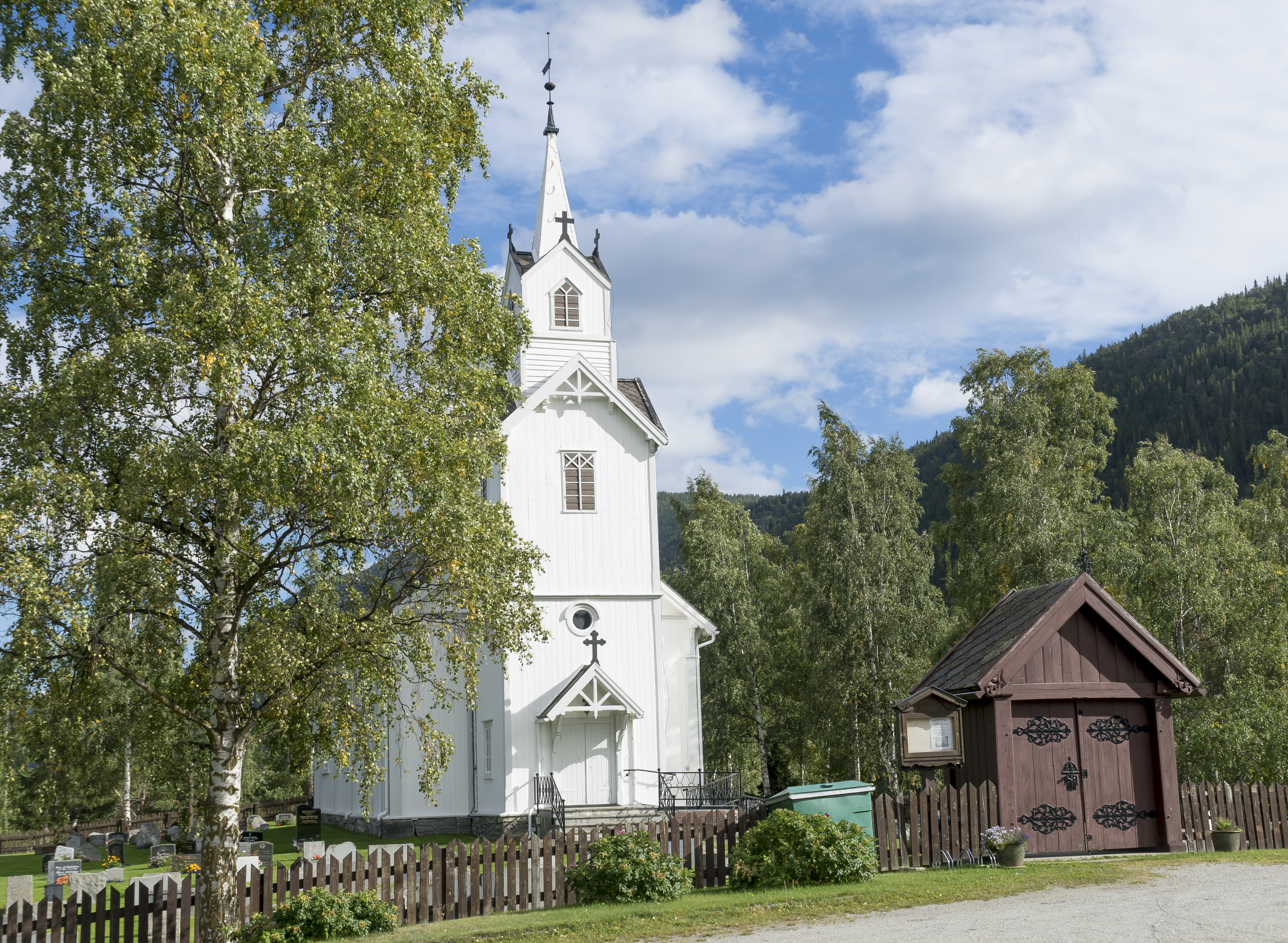
- View of the church
- Garmo Church
- 61°50′51″N 8°48′16″E
- Location: Lom Municipality, Innlandet
- Country: Norway
- Denomination: Church of Norway
- Previous denomination: Catholic Church
- Churchmanship: Evangelical Lutheran

History
- Status: Parish church
- Founded: 11th century
- Consecrated: 12 September 1879

Architecture
- Functional status: Active
- Architect: Jacob Wilhelm Nordan
- Architectural type: Long church
- Completed: 1879 (147 years ago)

Specifications
- Capacity: 150
- Materials: Wood

Administration
- Diocese: Hamar bispedømme
- Deanery: Nord-Gudbrandsdal prosti
- Parish: Garmo
- Norwegian Cultural Heritage Site
- Type: Church
- Status: Not protected
- ID: 84232

Garmo Church (Norwegian: Garmo kirke) is a parish church of the Church of Norway in Lom Municipality in Innlandet county, Norway. It is located in the village of Garmo. It is the church for the Garmo parish which is part of the Nord-Gudbrandsdal prosti (deanery) in the Diocese of Hamar. The white, wooden church was built in a long church design in 1879 using plans drawn up by the architect Jacob Wilhelm Nordan. The church seats about 150 people.

== History ==
The earliest existing historical records of the church date back to the year 1220, but the church was not new that year. The first church in Garmo was a wooden church that was built in the early 11th century. The first church stood on the shore of the lake Vågåvatn, about 700 metres (2,300 ft) to the north of the present church site. Probably during the 13th century, the old church was torn down and a new wooden stave church was built on the same site. In 1675, the church was described as old and rotten, and new construction was recommended, but this was not carried out. In 1690, the open-air exterior corridors that surrounded the church were removed, the church was given a new tower on the roof, and it was enlarged by adding transept cross arms which gave the church a cruciform design.

By the 1870s, the old church had grown too small for the parish, so plans were made for a new church to be built. The new church was to be built about 700 metres (2,300 ft) to the south of the old church, just off the main road through Lom. The architect was Jacob Wilhelm Nordan and the lead builder was Elias A. Tonning from Stryn. It was a wooden long church. The new church was built in 1879 and it was consecrated on 12 September 1879. Afterwards, the old Garmo Stave Church was carefully disassembled and moved to Lillehammer Municipality where it was rebuilt and set up as a museum.

== Media gallery ==
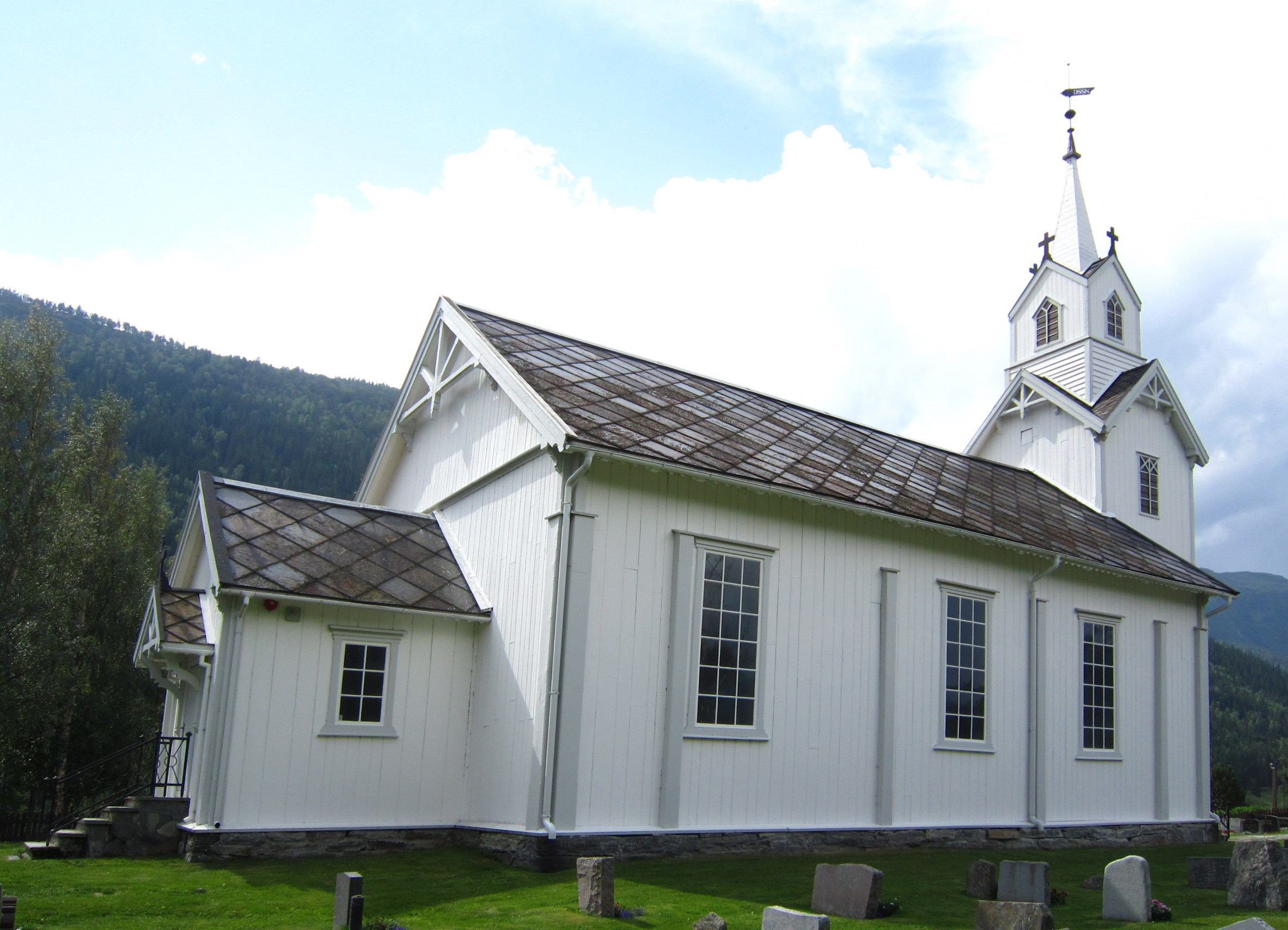

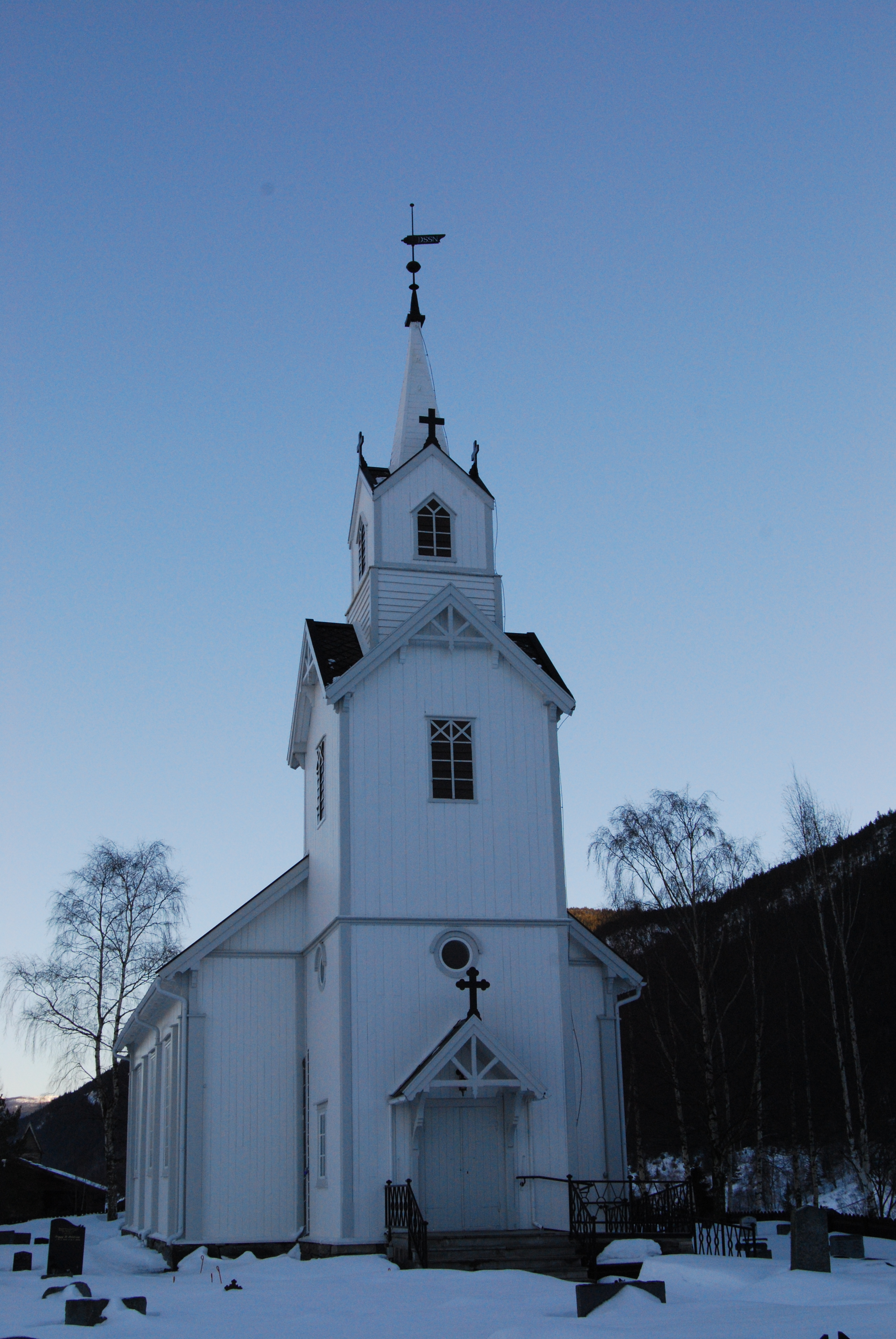

== See also ==
- List of churches in Hamar
