= Geranium (restaurant) =

Danish restaurant

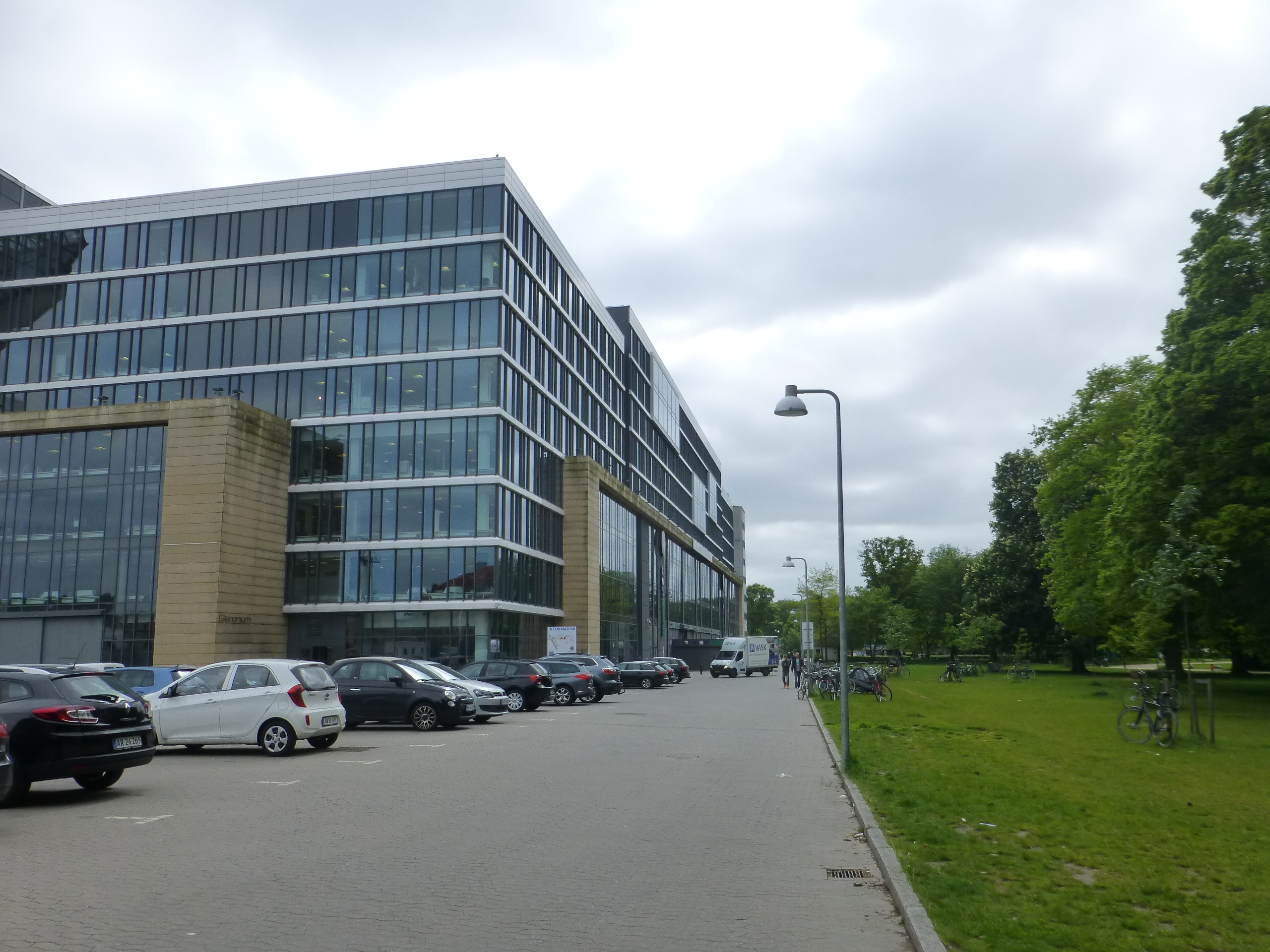
- Geranium on eighth floor in H-Tårn, Parken.
- Interactive map of Geranium

Restaurant information
- Established: 2007; 19 years ago (in Kongens Have); 2010; 16 years ago (in Parken)
- Owner(s): Rasmus Kofoed; Søren Ørbæk Ledet; Seier Capital (80 %)
- Head chef: Rasmus Kofoed
- Food type: New Nordic
- Rating: (Michelin Guide)
- Location: København
- Coordinates: 55.70353°N 12.5724°E
- Website: geranium.dk

Geranium is a Danish gourmet restaurant in Parken in the center of Copenhagen. The head chef is Danish chef Rasmus Kofoed, who won the Bocuse d'Or in 2011. It was one of the first Danish three-starred restaurants according to the Michelin Guide. In 2022, it was named best restaurant in the world by The World’s 50 Best Restaurants.

== History ==
Restaurant Geranium was opened in the spring of 2007 in Kongens Have in Copenhagen by Rasmus Kofoed and Søren Ledet. Although the restaurant received a Michelin star in 2008, it was forced to close in 2009. It reopened in Parken, Østerbro, in 2010.

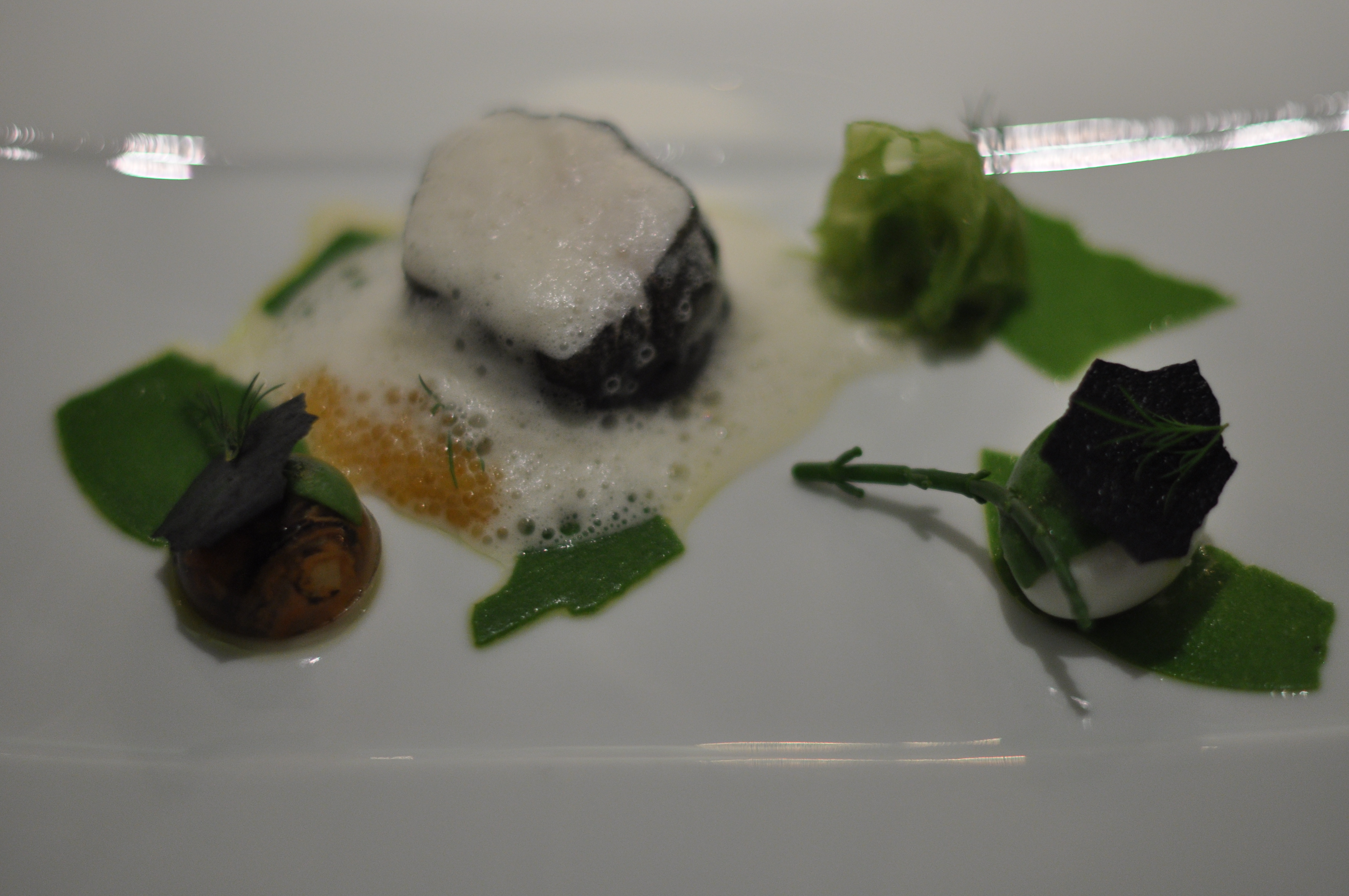
Angler with common quail, salicornia, seaweed and blue mussel jelly.

In March 2013, the restaurant received two Michelin stars. The following month, it was named the world's 45th-best restaurant by William Reed's The World’s 50 Best Restaurants; it had previously been listed in the 49th position. The restaurant kept the two Michelin stars for 2014. On February 24, 2016, Geranium was the first Danish restaurant to receive three Michelin stars. The Norwegian Michelin restaurant Maaemo also received three stars, which made these two restaurants the first Nordic restaurants to have three Michelin stars. In 2022, Geranium was named the world's best restaurant by William Reed's The World’s 50 Best Restaurants.
