= Odd Ivar Solvold =

Norwegian chef

Odd Ivar Solvold (born 21 July 1969 in Bamble Municipality, Norway) is a Norwegian chef from Sandefjord, 3 times Norwegian Champion in Culinary art 1990, 91,93, Young Chef of the Year 1988 Nice France, Chef of the Year 1995 and a 1997 Bocuse d'Or bronze medallist.

Solvold has in addition to his own career as a chef and restaurateur, author of cook books and successful culinary competitor, coached and mentored Bocuse d'Or contestants including Charles Tjessem gold medallist in the 2003 Bocuse d'Or, Geir Skeie gold medallist in the 2008 Bocuse d'Or Europe and 2009 Bocuse d'Or, and Ørjan Johannessen gold medallist in the 2012 Bocuse d'Or Europe, gold medalist Ørjan Johannessen Bocuse d'Or 2015 Lyon France .
