= Maaemo =

Norwegian restaurant

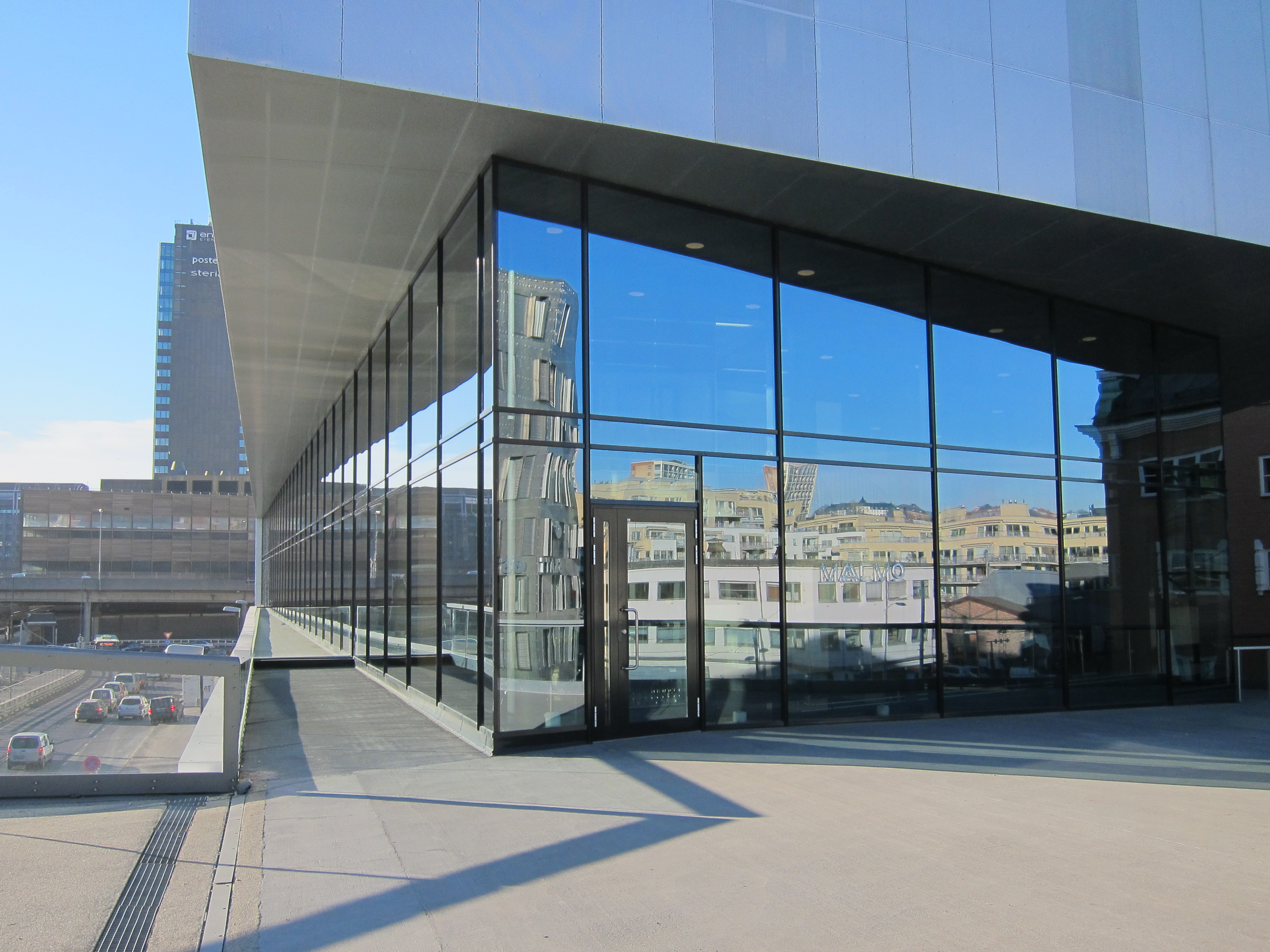
- Exterior of Maaemo

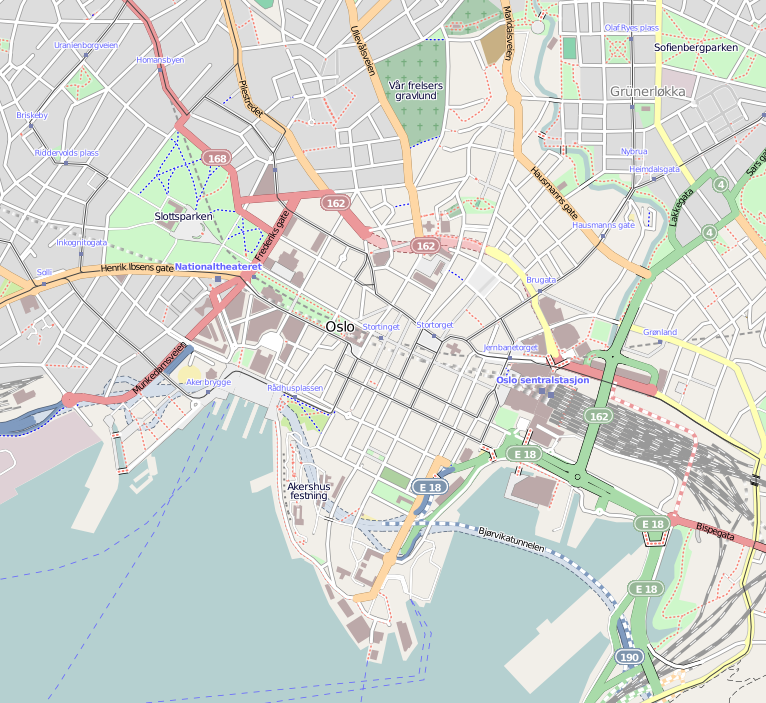
- Maaemo's location in Central Oslo

Restaurant information
- Established: December 2010
- Owners: Esben Holmboe Bang; Bjørn Tore Furset
- Head chef: Esben Holmboe Bang
- Food type: Organic and wild foods and produce
- Rating: Michelin Guide:
- Location: Dronning Eufemias gate 23, 0194, Oslo, Norway
- Coordinates: 59°54′38″N 10°45′37″E
- Seating capacity: Limited
- Reservations: Requested
- Website: maaemo.no

Maaemo is a three-Michelin-star restaurant in Oslo, Norway. The name Maaemo derives from the Finnish language, meaning "Mother earth". The restaurant works in the New Nordic Cuisine genre, and focuses on local food and only uses organic, biodynamic, or wild produce. The head chef is Danish Esben Holmboe Bang.

The restaurant was, together with Copenhagen´s Geranium, the first Nordic restaurant to be awarded three stars in the Michelin guide in February 2016.

In June 2016, Maaemo was voted 61st best restaurant in the world at The World's 50 Best Restaurants awards. In 2018, it was placed 35th. In December 2019, the restaurant closed to move to another location. This resulted in the loss of all of its three Michelin stars in February 2020. In September 2021 Maaemo won back the three stars.
