= Statholdergaarden =

Gourmet restaurant in Oslo, Norway

Coordinates: 59.9095°N 10.7433°E

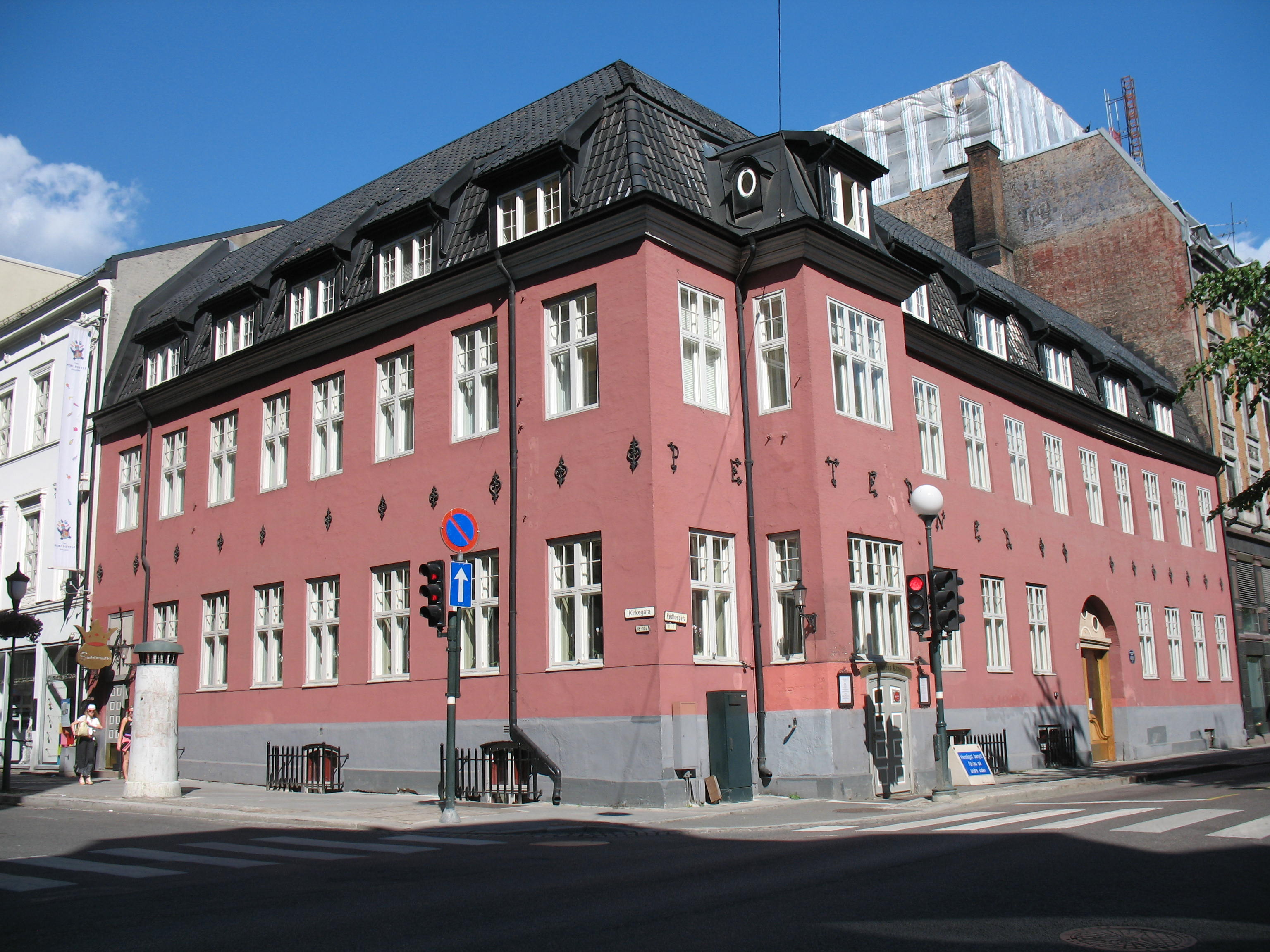
Statholdergaarden on the corner of Rådhusgata and Kirkegata.

Statholdergaarden is a gourmet restaurant in the Kvadraturen sector of central Oslo, Norway.

The restaurant is led by Bocuse d'Or winning chef Bent Stiansen and his wife Anette Stiansen until her death in May 2010. Established by the couple in 1994, Statholdergaarden is merited with one Michelin star, and its wine selection rated "Best of Award of Excellence" by Wine Spectator.

There is also a Danish inn, Statholderens Krostue, located in the building, a protected villa dated to 1640, which is the former home of Ulrik Frederik Gyldenløve and Oslo lodgings of Tordenskjold.
