= Ørjan Johannessen =

Norwegian chef

Ørjan Johannessen (born 10 August 1985) is a Norwegian chef and the winner of the 2015 Bocuse d'Or Europe held in Brussels in March 2012. Johannessen earned the selection to compete in the Bocuse d'Or Europe by winning the Norwegian Chef of the Year in 2011. Johannessen, with a background working for Bekkjarvik Gjestgiveri and Mathuset Solvold, has prior Bocuse d'Or experience from serving as commis under Geir Skeie winning the 2008 Bocuse d'Or Europe.

Johannessen was in training for six months ahead of the Brussels contest. He was coached by previous bronze Bocuse d'Or medallist Odd Ivar Solvold, and his commis was Julie Ekse Jenssen.
