= Rasmus Kofoed =

Danish chef and restaurateur (born 1974)

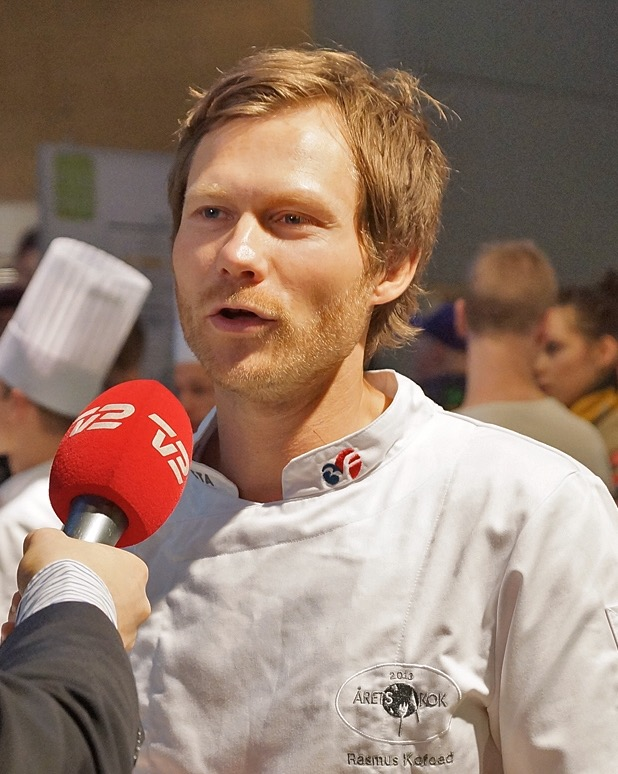
- Rasmus Kofoed in 2013
- Born: 22 August 1974 (age 51); Birkerød, Denmark
- Spouse: Maja Bak-Hansen
- Children: 3
- Culinary career
- Cooking style: New Nordic
- Rating: Michelin stars
- Current restaurant: Geranium

Rasmus Kofoed (born 1974) is a Danish chef and restaurateur who won the gold medal at the 2011 Bocuse d'Or, after previously taking the bronze medal in 2005 and the silver medal in 2007 in the same competition. He is the head chef and co-owner of Geranium, a 3-star Michelin restaurant in Copenhagen.

== Early life ==
Kofoed was born in Birkerød in 1974. He grew up with his mother after his parents split up after a few months. She later had four more children with her new husband, Ole, a biologist. Kofoed attended Rudolf Steiner schools in first Kvistgård and then Vordingborg.

== Career ==
Rasmus Kofoed received his training at Hotel D’Angleterre on Kongens Nytorv in Copenhagen and afterwards worked at the two-Michelin-star restaurant Scholteshof in Belgium. On his return to Copenhagen, he served as head chef at various top restaurants before opening his first restaurant, Geranium (one Michelin Star Awarded in 2012, two in 2013, three in 2016) in Rosenborg Gardens, together with Søren Ledet. Shortly after, the restaurant received a star in the Michelin Guide but faced closure after the bankruptcy of an investor in 2009. In 2010 the restaurant re-opened in one of the office towers of Parken Stadium, a football stadium in the Indre Østerbro (Inner Østerbro) district of Copenhagen, Denmark.

In 2007, he served as the captain of the Danish national chef team at the Bocuse d'Or. While some controversy surrounded the Bocuse d'Or victory of French chef Fabrice Desvignes, Kofoed made no official complaint. Desvignes became the subject of controversy, allegedly cheating by smuggling precooked ingredients into the final. The events became the subject of the 2008 book Infernoet i Lyon.

In October 2009, Kofoed was the Danish selection for representation at the 2011 Bocuse d'Or, becoming the first person to participate in the competition three times. At the time, he stated his ambition was "to bring home the one statue I'm missing," which he did in the January 2011 finals. This gold medal prize followed his victory in the 2010 Bocuse d'Or Europe.

Geranium became the first Danish Michelin 3-star restaurant in 2016 and has held its 3 stars since then.

== Personal life ==
Kofoed is in a relationship with his cohabitant, Maja Bak-Hansen. They have three children: Kamille (born 2012), Karljohan (born 2014) and Augusta (born 2016).

== Awards ==
- Bronze medal, 2005 Bocuse d'Or
- Silver medal, 2007 Bocuse d'Or
- Gold medal, 2010 Bocuse d'Or Europe.
- Gold medal, 2011 Bocuse d'Or
