= The Thief (hotel) =

Hotel in Oslo, Norway

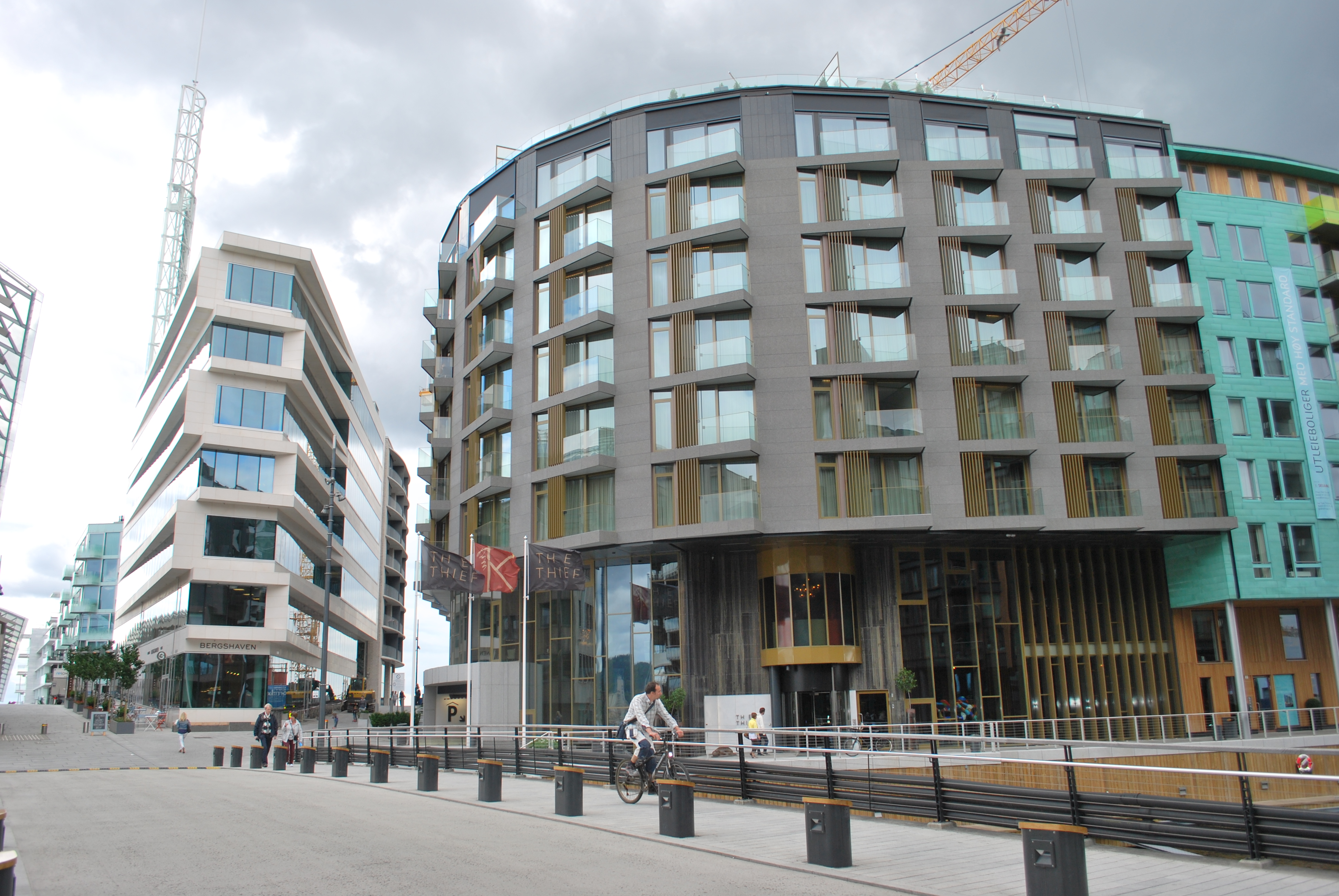
- Interactive map of the The Thief area

General information
- Location: Landgangen 1 Tjuvholmen; Oslo
- Coordinates: 59°54′27″N 10°43′16″E
- Opening: 2013
- Owner: Petter Stordalen
- Management: Nordic Hotels & Resorts

Technical details
- Floor count: 8

Design and construction
- Architect: Mellbye Architects

Other information
- Number of rooms: 119
- Number of restaurants: Fru K (www.fru-k.no)

Website
- www.thethief.com

The Thief is a luxury waterfront hotel located on Landgangen 1 on the islet of Tjuvholmen (Thief Islet) in Oslo, Norway, designed by the award-winning Mellbye Architects. The hotel opened on January 9, 2013, and is currently the only hotel designated as a Design Hotel in Norway. The Thief has 119 rooms and is a part of the Nordic Hotels & Resort chain owned by Forbes-billionaire Petter Stordalen. It is situated right next to the Astrup Fearnley Museum of Modern Art, and thanks to a collaboration between the two, there is a large collection of contemporary art in the hotel. According to press reports, the hotel owned by Tjuvholmen KS had a price tag of 720 million NOK, giving each of the 119 rooms an average cost price of more than one million dollars.

== History ==
The Thief is situated on Tjuvholmen, an islet that according to local historians was overrun by robbers and whores in the 18th century. Today, Tjuvholmen is one of Norway's most innovative urban renewal projects.

== Collaborations ==
The former director of Norway's National Museum, Swedish curator Sune Nordgren has hand picked paintings, prints, sculptures, and installations for the rooms and public areas, while interior designer Anemone Wille Våge decorated the rooms and Scandinavian designer Maggie Wonka designed the bathrobes. The international music collective Apparatjik has hand picked music on vinyl as part of in-room entertainment. The group has also created the music used for the hotel's wake-up call and the turndown service. In the Apparatjik suite guests can project the members of the group onto their bed creating an illusion of being in bed with the band.

== Restaurant ==
The hotel restaurant Fru K focuses on local and organic food, and was headed by noted chef Kari Innerå, who won The Culinary Olympics in Erfurt in 2008. In order to have Innerå sign up for the job, Petter Stordalen had to buy half of her other restaurant Cru. Innerå later ended the collaboration with Stordalen and started the restaurant BA53.

== Critical reception ==
The Thief was named Norway's first six star hotel by the British newspaper The Independent. Wallpaper wrote that "In spite of top-notch art and impeccable design, what really stole our hearts was the spirit of the people working here." The hotel was on New York Times list over 46 destinations to check out in 2013 and on Conde Nast's Hot List for 2013. The hotel also made it into the Norway Hotel Guide.

== Celebrity guests ==
Since the opening, The Thief has hosted a wide range of celebrity guests, including Justin Bieber, Thirty Seconds to Mars, Ellie Goulding, Lana Del Rey, Pink, Bill Gates, Helena Christensen, Steven Van Zandt, Green Day, Rihanna, MUSE, Julio Iglesias, Dave Navarro, Mary-Kate and Ashley Olsen, and Steven Tyler.

== Art ==
Through a collaboration with its neighbor, the Astrup Fearnley museum of contemporary art, the Thief display signal work from the museum's collection. Grazing the walls of the hotel you will find works form artists like Andy Warhol, HRH Queen Sonja of Norway, Charles Ray and Bryan Ferry. The hotel's permanent art collection is curated by Sune Nordgren, the former director of Norway's National Museum of Art. Nordgren has handpicked original artwork for each of the 119 rooms, from artists such as Sir Peter Blake, Richard Prince, Magne Furuholmen, Camilla Löw and Kjell Nupen, as well as rising talent. As a world's first the interactive TVs in each room offer 'art on demand' with a choice of contemporary video art. The Independent wrote: "Warhol is the biggest name, but the public areas of this hotel carry the work of some of the most important names in contemporary art: Fiona Banner's pink-lettered, sub-pornographic text of Lawrence of Arabia - The Desert - for example; Tony Cragg's wryly brutish Subcommittee, a knobbly metal sculpture that weighs the best part of a ton; Niki de Saint Phalle's sinuous steel-and-polyester sculpture Le Grand Rossignol floats touchably in a plush sitting area - a snip at £560,000, if it were for sale."
