= Château de Couffour =

Ruined castle in Auvergne-Rhône-Alpes, France

Coordinates: 44°50′39″N 3°0′7″E

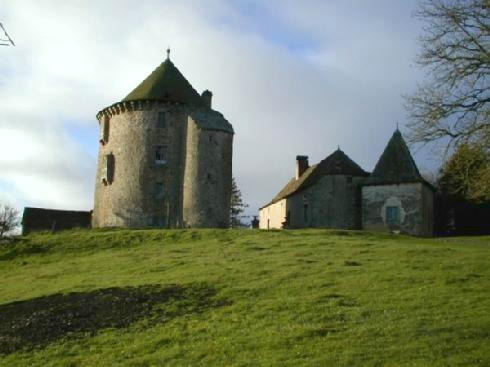
Remains of the Château de Couffour

The Château de Couffour or Tour du Couffour is a ruined castle situated in the French commune of Chaudes-Aigues in the Cantal département.

The original 15th-century castle, with seven towers with conical roof, was witness to the importance of this place during the Hundred Years War. The present remains consist of a tower and neighbouring buildings. The circular tower has attached to it, on the west, a smaller tower containing the spiral staircase that gives access to the upper floors. The ground floor, noticeably square, is vaulted. The rooms on the three upper floors display a more or less similar layout. Small circular rooms communicate with each of these rooms. On the first floor, one room still has 17th-century paintings where, on a background of bouquets of leaves and flowers, are inset portraits of women and landscapes in rectangular frames. The first floor room has an 18th-century painted wooden fireplace.

In the 18th century, the castle was sold to a local owner. The French Revolution and the early 19th century were a period of decline; poorly maintained, the castle fell into disrepair. Now the property of the commune of Chaudes-Aigues, Château de Couffour is listed as a monument historique by the French Ministry of Culture.

Since 2009, the castle has been a hotel-restaurant with 2 stars in the Michelin Guide, under Serge Vieira, winner of the Bocuse d'Or in 2005.

== See also ==
- List of castles in France
