= Yasuji Sasaki =

Japanese chef

YasujiSasaki (born February 28, 1967) is a Japanese chef, and winner of the 2008 Bocuse d'Or Asia, the inaugural competition of its kind. He represented Japan in the 2009 world final of the Bocuse d'Or.

Sasaki is a chef at the Alain Chapel in Kobe Portopia Hotel, and has previously worked at the Intercontinental Hotel of Amsterdam, Netherlands, the Hôtel de Crillon in Paris, France and eight years at the Heritage in the Huistenbosch Hotel & Resort in Nagasaki.
