= Chaudes-Aigues =

Commune in Auvergne-Rhône-Alpes, France

Chaudes-Aigues Chaudas Aigas (Occitan)
- Commune
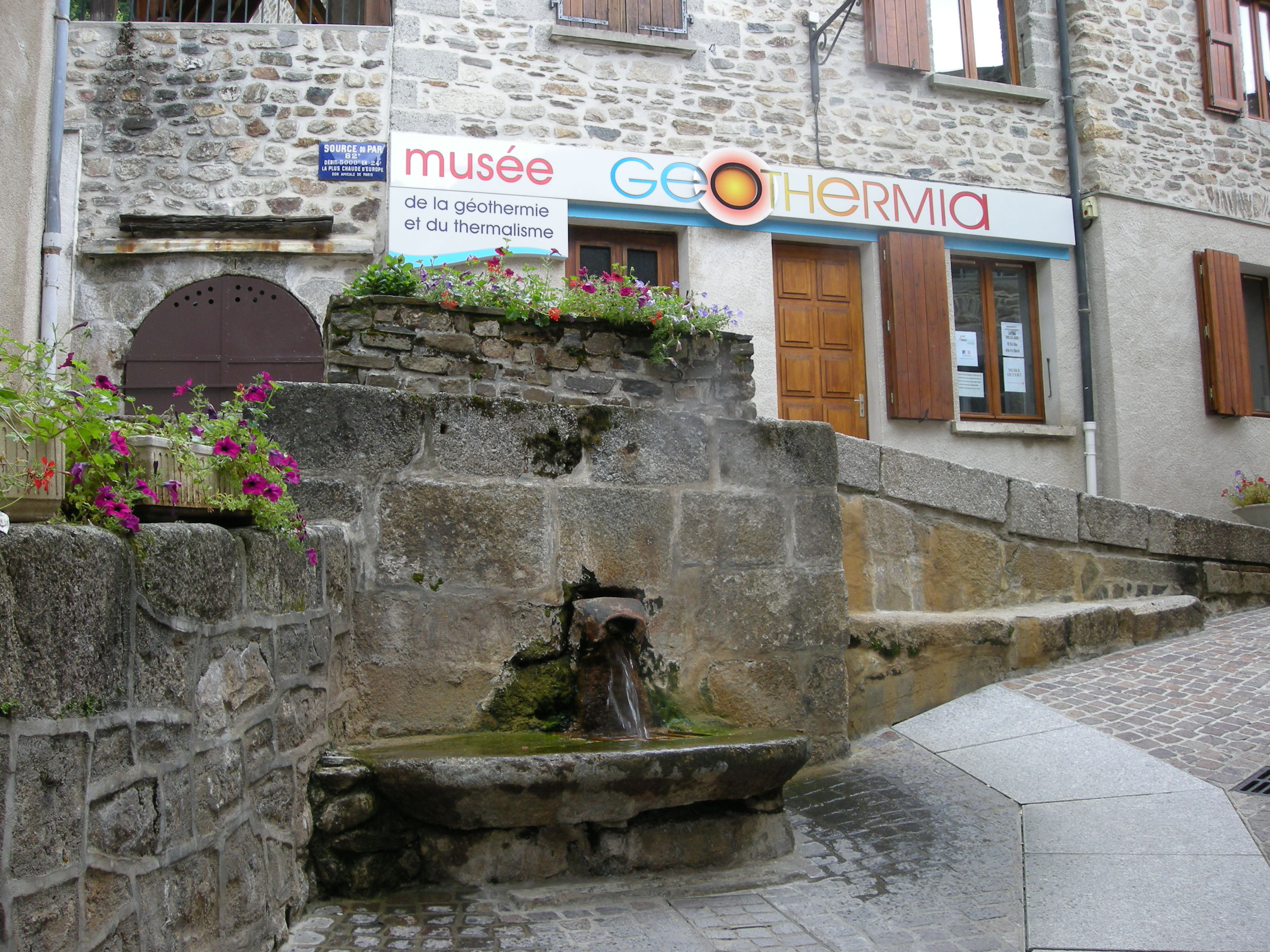
- Source of the Par and museum

- Coat of arms
- Location of Chaudes-Aigues
- Location within France Location within Auvergne-Rhône-Alpes
- Coordinates: 44°51′19″N 3°00′17″E
- Country: France
- Region: Auvergne-Rhône-Alpes
- Department: Cantal
- Arrondissement: Saint-Flour
- Canton: Neuvéglise-sur-Truyère
- Intercommunality: Saint-Flour Communauté

Government
  - Mayor (2020–2026): Michel Brousse
- Area^{1}: 53.16 km^{2} (20.53 sq mi)
- Elevation: 750 m (2,460 ft)
- Highest elevation: 1,280 m (4,200 ft)
- Lowest elevation: 637 m (2,090 ft)
- Population (2023): 813
  - Density: 15.3/km^{2} (39.6/sq mi)
- Time zone: UTC+01:00 (CET)
  - Summer (DST): UTC+02:00 (CEST)
- INSEE/Postal code: 15045 /15110
- ^{1} French Land Register data, which excludes lakes, ponds, glaciers > 1 km^{2} (0.386 sq mi or 247 acres) and river estuaries.

Chaudes-Aigues (French: [ʃod.z‿ɛɡ]; Occitan: Chaudas Aigas, lit. '"Hot Waters"') is a commune in the Cantal department in south-central France. It is a spa town, famous for its hot spring waters.

== Geography ==
The commune is situated in the Massif Central in Aubrac. Its inhabitants are called the Caldaguès, from the Latin meaning 'hot waters', or in French, eaux chaudes; hence the name of the commune, Chaudes-Aigues

As its name suggests, there are thirty natural hot water sources with temperatures ranging from 45 °C to more than 80 °C. The most famous is the source of the Par river with a water temperature of 82 °C - the hottest in Europe - with a flow in the region of 450,000 litres a day. One local story suggests that the source is so-named because a pig was dressed (paré) or jointed thanks to the hot water. The waters were known to the Romans, and are used all year round. In winter, they have provided heat for houses and the church as district heating since the 14th Century; from spring the waters are channeled to the spa for the treatment of rheumatics.

The Remontalou crosses the commune.

== Population ==
Historical population
Year	Pop.	±% p.a.
1968	1,114	—
1975	1,187	+0.91%
1982	1,186	−0.01%
1990	1,110	−0.82%
1999	986	−1.31%
2007	970	−0.20%
2012	927	−0.90%
2017	886	−0.90%
2023	813	−1.42%
Source: INSEE

== Sights ==
The Château de Couffour is a ruined castle, dating back to the 15th century, situated in the commune.

== See also ==
- Communes of the Cantal department
