= Yasuji Kamada =

Japanese photographer

Yasuji Kamada (鎌田 彌壽治, Kamada Yasuji; 1883–1977) was a Japanese photographer.
