= Fabrice Desvignes =

French chef (born 1973)

- Born: 1973 (age 52–53)
- Occupation: Chef

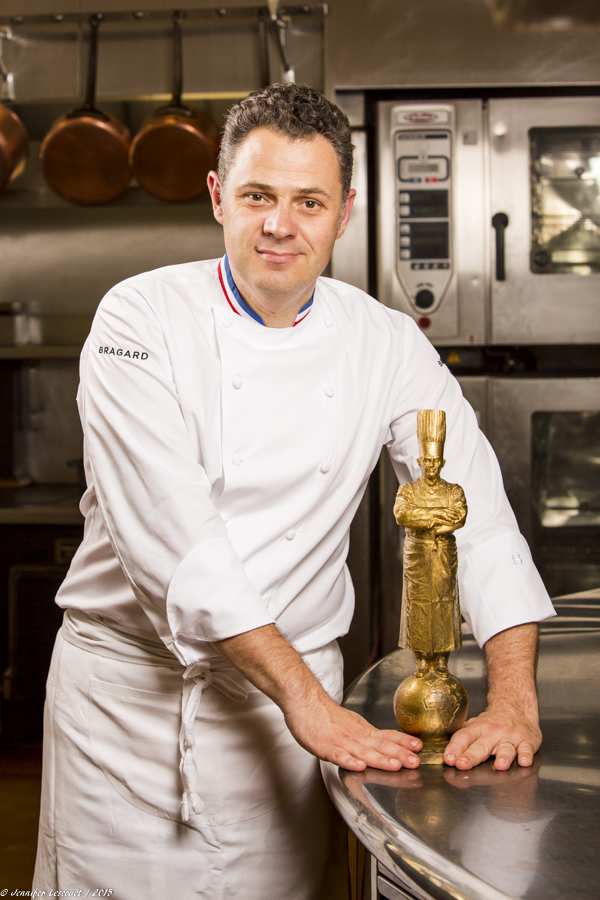
Fabrice Desvignes en 2015.jpg in 2015

Fabrice Desvignes (French pronunciation: [fabʁis deviɲ]), born in 1973, is a French chef, and winner of the 2007 Bocuse d'Or. Desvignes is head chef at the Élysée Palace (official residence of the President of the French Republic) after having been a second chef at the Présidence du Sénat in Paris.

Desvignes's prize-winning dish was a volaille de Bresse truffée (truffled Bresse chicken). During the course of the contest, a late delivery of two metal containers to Desvignes became the subject of controversy, with allegations made of cheating by smuggling precooked ingredients into the final. A contest director responded that the containers were delivered to Desvignes two minutes before he started work because snow delayed their overnight arrival, and these contained silverware and foie gras, which were not prohibited.

He is the son of the French chef Annie Desvignes.
