= Eyvind Hellstrøm =

Norwegian chef

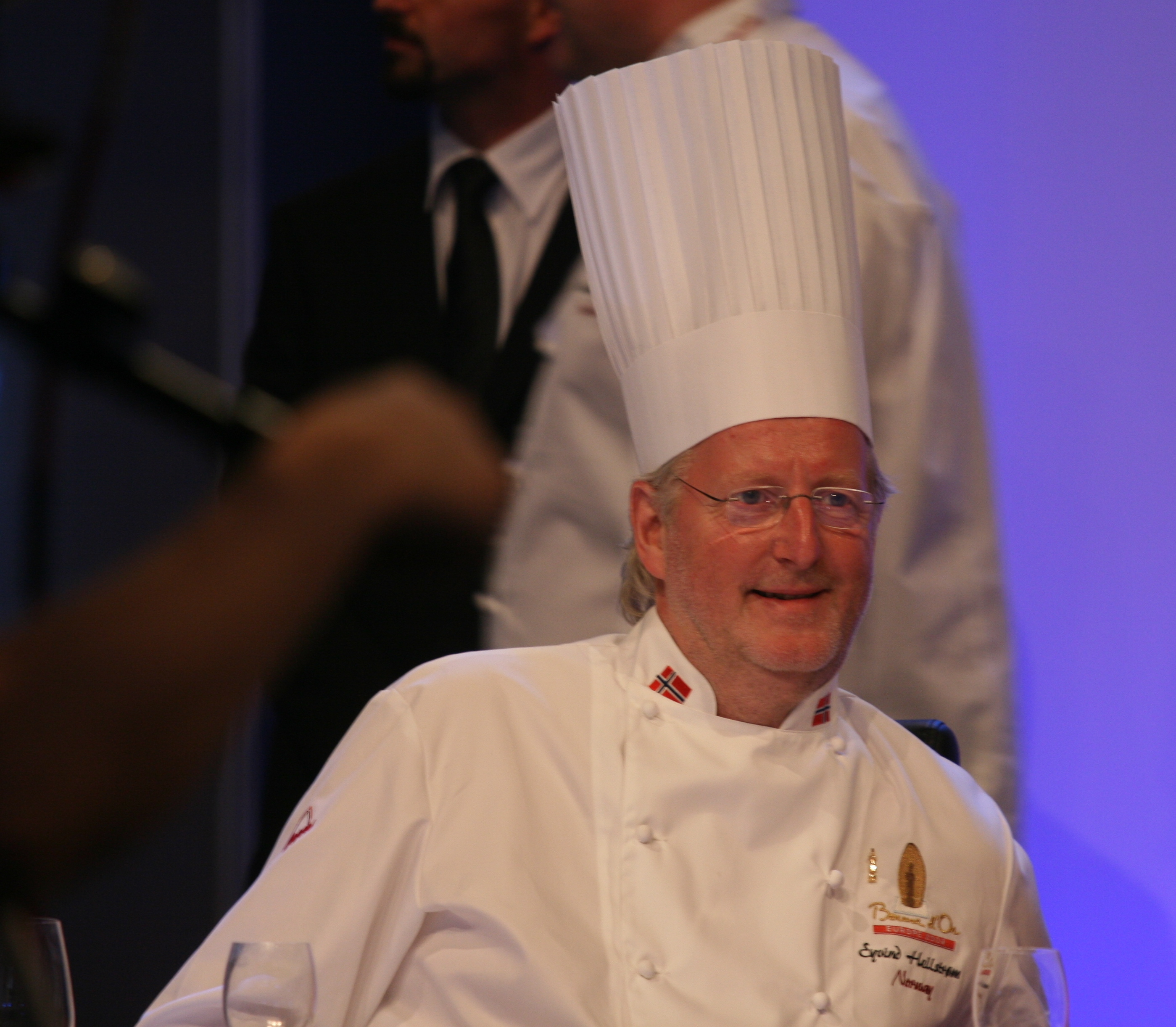
- Born: 2 December 1948 (age 77); Moss, Norway
- Culinary career
- Rating: Michelin stars
- Previous restaurant: Bagatelle
- Television show(s): Hellstrøm rydder opp MasterChef
- Website: www.hellstrom.no

Eyvind Hellstrøm (born 2 December 1948) is a Norwegian chef and formerly the part owner of Bagatelle, a two-Michelin-starred restaurant in the city of Oslo. He was the president of the 2008 Bocuse d'Or Europe, is frequently a judge at the Bocuse d'Or world finals, and was himself a competition candidate in 1989, placing fifth.

In December 2009, Hellstrøm announced he would leave Bagatelle after 27 years, due to a long term conflict with majority owner Christen Sveaas. Hellstrøm and the entire Bagatelle staff worked their final shift on 21 December.

An author of several books, including Inn med sølvskje with Anne-Kat. Hærland, Hellstrøm also hosts the Norwegian TV3 television show Hellstrøm rydder opp, broadcast in 2008, 2009 and 2010, a Norwegian version of Gordon Ramsay's Kitchen Nightmares. Though initially criticized for playing the role excessively "nice", the series featured its share of conflicts such as the episode devoted to the Trondheim seafood restaurant Fru Inger. The programme was characterized as a "slaughter" of Fru Inger, and shortly after the broadcast the restaurant was forced to close down.

In 2010, Hellstrøm joined Tom Victor Gausdal and Jan Vardøen as judges on the TV3 version of the cooking challenge TV program MasterChef.

In 2007 Hellstrøm was awarded the Knight, First Class of the Royal Norwegian Order of St. Olav.
