= Bagatelle (restaurant) =

Coordinates: 59°54′53.55″N 10°43′01.50″E

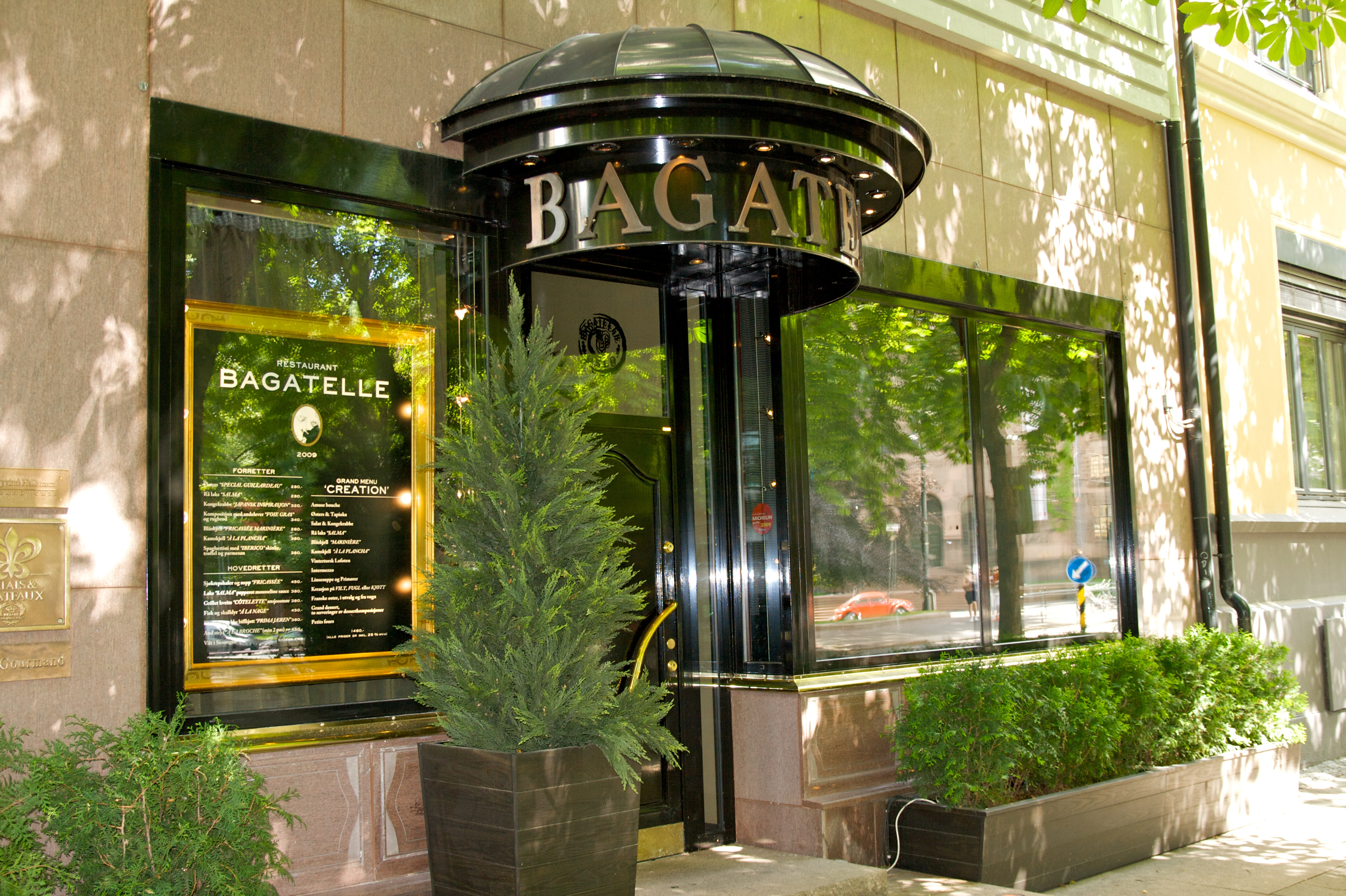
- Bagatelle restaurant, Oslo, Norway.
- Interactive map of Bagatelle

Restaurant information
- Established: 1982; 44 years ago
- Closed: 2014; 12 years ago
- Head chef: Eyvind Hellstrøm
- Food type: French
- Location: Bygdøy allé 3, Oslo, N-0257, Norway
- Website: www.bagatelle.no

Bagatelle was a French restaurant in the borough Frogner in Oslo, Norway.

Bagatelle first received two Michelin stars in 1993, and as of 2008 was the only Norwegian restaurant to achieve a two-star rating. The restaurant lost one of its stars in 2008, though was restored as a two-star restaurant in March 2009. In the 2011 Michelin Guide Bagatelle had zero stars, but regained a star in 2012.

The restaurant was led by chef Eyvind Hellstrøm, and was owned 96% by Christen Sveaas. Hellstrøm ran the restaurant from 1982 until December 2009, when announced he would be leaving the restaurant due to a long term conflict with Sveaas.

Under Hellstrøm, Bagatelle served a cuisine that fused classical French technique with Norwegian ingredients such as wild salmon, scallops, king crab and game. Signature dishes included scallop carpaccio with sea urchin, lobster in orange-dill sauce, and wild pigeon with trompettes de la mort mushrooms.

Bagatelle closed in September 2014 after having operated at a loss for several years.
