= International Exhibition of Culinary Art =

Chef competition

The International Exhibition of Culinary Art (in German: Internationale Kochkunst Ausstellung or IKA), termed the Culinary Olympics, is a quadrennial chef competition, and the biggest culinary exhibition in the world. Last held in 2024, the event has in recent years been organised in Stuttgart, Germany.

Though the Bocuse d'Or of France is frequently referred to as the culinary equivalent of the Olympic Games, it is biennial and not separated by an olympiad, i.e. a period of four years.

== History ==
Conceived by a group of German chefs in 1896 with an aim to promote German cuisine to the world while receiving impulses from other cooking cultures, the first competition was arranged in 1900 in Frankfurt with four nations participating. Initially organized by the Internationalen Verbandes der Köche (International Association of Chefs) in cooperation with other organizations, it became subject to Hitler's ban of all international societies during World War II. Every event took place in Frankfurt until 1996 when it was moved to Berlin. Since 2000 it has been staged at Erfurt.

The 2012 event involved 54 nations with 1,600 participating chefs, with Sweden coming in first place, Norway placing second and Germany in third. Sweden was also the winner in the Junior Team competition.

== Competition disciplines ==
Involving large chef teams, the nations compete in a number of categories, most with subcategories:

- National - Senior: Competition Category "Restaurant of Nations", Competition Category A "Culinary Art", Competition Category B "Culinary Art" and Competition Category "Pâtisserie"
- National - Junior: Competition Category "Hot Kitchen and Culinary Studio", Competition Category A "Cold Platter", Competition Category B "Culinary Art" and Competition Category C "Pâtisserie"
- Military: Competition Category R "Restaurant of Nations" and Competition Category B "Cooking"
- Community Catering
- Regional: Category A "Culinary Art" and Category B "Culinary Art"
- Individual: Category A "Culinary Art", Category B "Culinary Art", Category C "Pâtisserie", Category D - "Culinary Artistry - Cold Kitchen, Showpiece" and Category D- "Culinary Artistry -Pâtisserie, Showpiece"
