= Bocuse d'Or =

Biennial world chef championship

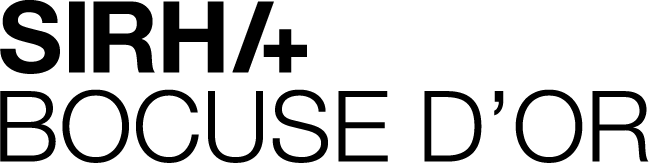
- Status: Active
- Genre: Cooking
- Venue: SIRHA International Hotel
- Locations: Lyon, France
- Years active: 39
- Inaugurated: January 1987
- Founder: Paul Bocuse
- Most recent: 2025
- Next event: 2027
- Participants: 24 countries
- Website: bocusedor.com

The Bocuse d'Or (the Concours mondial de la cuisine, World Cooking Contest) is a biennial world chef championship. Named for the chef Paul Bocuse, the event takes place during two days near the end of January in Lyon, France, at the SIRHA International Hotel, Catering and Food Trade Exhibition, and is one of the world's most prestigious cooking competitions.

The event is frequently referred to as the gastronomy equivalent of the Olympic Games, though the International Exhibition of Culinary Art in Germany is more officially titled the Culinary Olympics and is separated by an olympiad, i.e. a period of four years.

== History ==
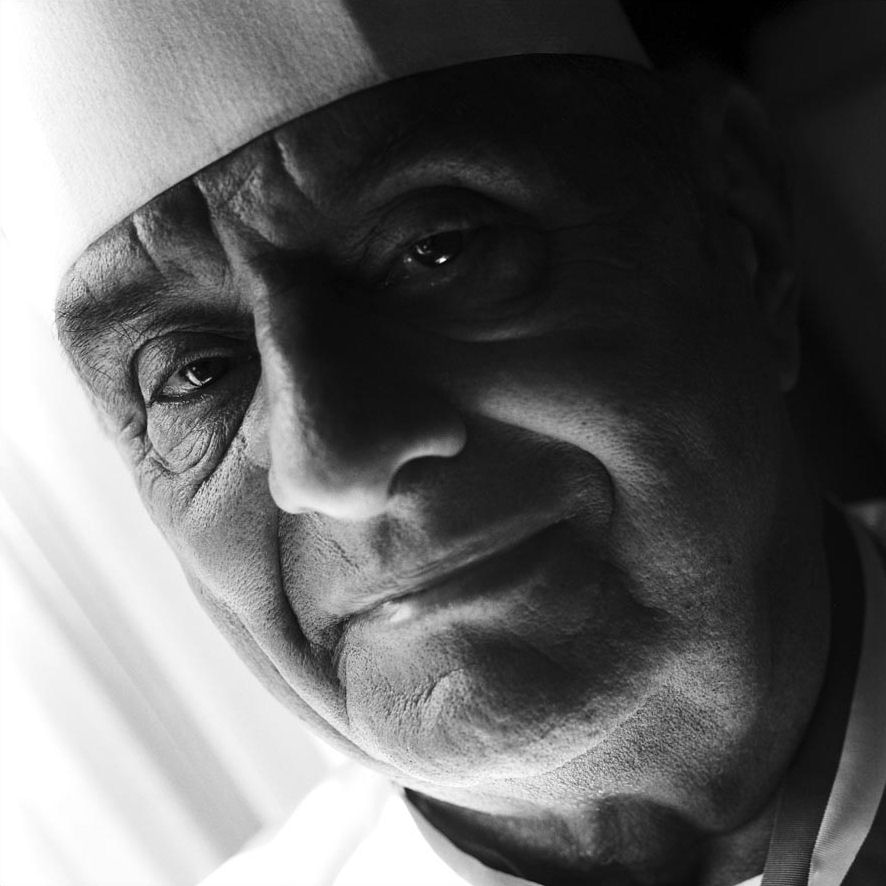
Paul Bocuse, founder of the Bocuse d'Or

Based on an event first arranged in 1983, when the Salon des Métiers de Bouche (Culinary Sector Exhibition and Trade Fair, later renamed Salon international de la restauration de l'hôtellerie et de l'alimentation, SIRHA) took place in Lyon as "an exhibition organised by professionals for professionals". Paul Bocuse, appointed Honorary President of the exhibition, conceived the idea of a culinary competition to take place during the exhibition, with preparation of all dishes taking place live in front of an audience. Several gastronomy contests were already in existence, however none of them presented a "live performance" and consequently one could not actually see the work performed in the kitchens of the chefs' restaurants.

The initial Bocuse d'Or took place in January 1987. The SIRHA, having grown to become one of the biggest and most sophisticated food and culinary arts fairs in the world, also arranges other contests of culinary skill, including the Coupe du Monde de la Pâtisserie (World Pastry Cup) and in recent years Mondial du Pain (World of Bread Contest).

The audience atmosphere of the Bocuse d'Or evolved in 1997 when the support for the Mexican candidate included a mariachi band, foghorns, cowbells, cheering and yelling from the stands, marking the beginning of a tradition of noisy spectator presence. At first, the reigning champion nation was not permitted to participate in the following contest, but that rule was removed after the 1999 event when France was competing and did not win gold for the first time.

France, the invariable home team, has won gold on eight occasions, while Belgium, Norway and Sweden have consistently finished in one of the top three placements. Léa Linster of Luxembourg became the first woman to win in 1989, and Rasmus Kofoed of Denmark became the first multiple medalist with bronze and silver in 2005 and 2007, and the eventual gold medal in 2011. Prior to finishing in second place in 2015 and winning the competition in 2017, the U.S. team had not placed higher than sixth as in 2003 and 2009, while the highest ranking of a North American chef was the fourth-place result of Canadian Robert Sulatycky in 1999.

The 2007 Bocuse d'Or was featured in the documentary film, El Pollo, el Pez, y el Cangrejo Real. The U.S. effort leading up to the 2009 Bocuse d'Or is the subject of the book Knives at Dawn.

The U.S. won second place in 2015 when Philip Tessier and Skylar Stover made history by becoming both the first Americans to mount the podium as well as the first non-European team to win silver. Coached by Gavin Kaysen, Thomas Keller, Jerome Bocuse and Daniel Boulud, this was an extraordinary milestone for a country that had competed every year since the competitions inception in 1987. In 2017 the U.S. won the competition, finishing ahead of Norway in second place and Iceland in third. The team's head chef was Mathew Peters and his commis, or helper, was Harrison Turone. Both had previously worked at Keller's New York City restaurant Per Se.

=== Semi-finals ===
After its 20th anniversary, the format was expanded, with the first Bocuse d'Or Asia contest taking place in May 2008 in Shanghai and Bocuse d'Or Europe in July 2008 in Stavanger. The inaugural winners were Yasuji Sasaki from Japan and Geir Skeie of Norway, respectively. Skeie went on to win the 2009 world final.

The inaugural Bocuse d'Or USA competition took place at Epcot in September 2008, and an escalated effort followed with Team USA provided with a preparation budget near $500,000 ahead of the 2009 finals, citing that many European nations often have budgets of more than $1 million. Team USA was represented by Timothy Hollingsworth, then sous-chef at French Laundry, coached by Roland Henin. Paul Bocuse stated, "I hope [the U.S. team] will win because we'd really like this competition to cross the Atlantic". Ultimately, Hollingsworth also placed sixth.

The Bocuse d'Or USA 2010 took place at the earlier February 2010 date arranged at The Culinary Institute of America in Hyde Park, New York. The winner was James Kent who represented Team USA in Lyon in 2011, eventually placing tenth. The Bocuse d'Or Asia 2010 was again arranged in Shanghai in March 2010, won by the Malaysian all-women team of See Lay Na. The Bocuse d'Or Europe 2010 arranged in Geneva in June 2010 was won by Danish previous Bocuse d'Or bronze and silver medalist Rasmus Kofoed, who went on to win the 2011 world final.

Ahead of the Bocuse d'Or 2013, the Bocuse d'Or USA regional final was arranged in late January 2012 again at The Culinary Institute of America, Richard Rosendale becoming the selected U.S. contestant, while the Bocuse d'Or Europe was arranged in Brussels in late March 2012 with the gold medal won by Norwegian chef Ørjan Johannessen. The Bocuse d'Or Asia taking place in June 2012, again in Shanghai, was won by Yew Eng Tong representing Singapore.

=== Criticism ===
For the 2005 Bocuse d'Or, the Spanish delegation had chosen an innovative presentation inspired by Salvador Dalí motifs; for the fish course a serving vessel in the shape of a one-meter-high crystal egg, as a part of an ambitious campaign at the cost of near €1 million to achieve a good result in the competition. However, the Spanish candidate finished in the next to last place (a cited reason was that the warm dish produced such condensation to the inside of the egg that the judges were nearly unable to see the presentation), producing heated reactions from the Spanish delegation who called the jury old-fashioned and outdated, and members of the Spanish media who claimed that the chauvinistic jury despised the creativity of Spanish cooking and called the Bocuse d'Or a competition for buffet and catering.

Controversy arose during the 2007 Bocuse d'Or, as allegations of cheating were raised against the winning chef Fabrice Desvignes, due to the late delivery of two metal containers leading to claims that these contained prepared precooked ingredients. A contest director responded that the containers were delivered to Desvignes two minutes before he started work because snow delayed their overnight arrival, and these contained silverware and foie gras, not prohibited by the rules. Two days later the German daily newspaper Die Welt published the article "Gourmet-Skandal: Ist der weltbeste Koch wirklich ein Franzose?" (Gourmet Scandal: Is the World's Best Chef Really a Frenchman?), featuring testimony by the German assistant chef Khabbaz Hicham who described four men that brought black crates with prepared and semi-prepared ingredients, an hour and thirty minutes into the competition. The controversy led to amendments to the rules for future Bocuse d'Or contests, with the addition of a Kitchen Supervising Committee to control the candidate products and equipment.

== Competition ==
The qualification format has seen changes over the years, with a restructured scheme ahead of the 2009 Bocuse d'Or. 24 countries compete in the world finals, having achieved entry through different means: The top 12 finalists of the Bocuse d'Or Europe qualify, from a pool of 20 nations; the top 4 finalists of Bocuse d'Or Asia qualify, from a pool of 12 nations; the top 3 finalists of the Copa Azteca Latin American competition qualify, from a pool of 12 nations. Furthermore, 3 entrants are selected from national application, as well as 2 wild card selections.

Each team consists of two chefs, one lead chef, and a commis/assistant chef who must be under 22 years of age at the time of the competition. The team has 5 hours and 35 minutes to prepare two elaborate presentations, a meat dish and a fish dish. Taking place in an open "culinary theatre", fully equipped kitchens are lined up side by side, facing an area for the jury, members of the press and audiences, with spectator numbers limited to ca. 1,000 people. From the 2009 contest, a designated coach located on the outside of the kitchen area is permitted to communicate with the team. Also as of 2009, inspectors control equipment and products the backstage zone, as no vegetables may be pre-cut, although teams may pre-peel garlic, portion oil, salt, flour and other ingredients, and bring stocks made in advance.

The jury consists of 24 renowned chef judges who make their evaluations based on the level of perfection in the presentation, in terms of technical skill, cooking sophistication, creativity and visual beauty. The jury is divided into two groups of 12, each half to judge either the fish dish or the meat dish. The food's quality determines two-thirds of the score, 40 points; presentation determines 20 points. In the event of a tie, another 20 points will be awarded based on factors such as organization, teamwork, cleanliness and lack of waste. Judges have included Heston Blumenthal, Ferran Adrià, Wolfgang Puck, Eyvind Hellstrøm, Thomas Keller and past winners such as Fabrice Desvignes, Mathias Dahlgren and Léa Linster.

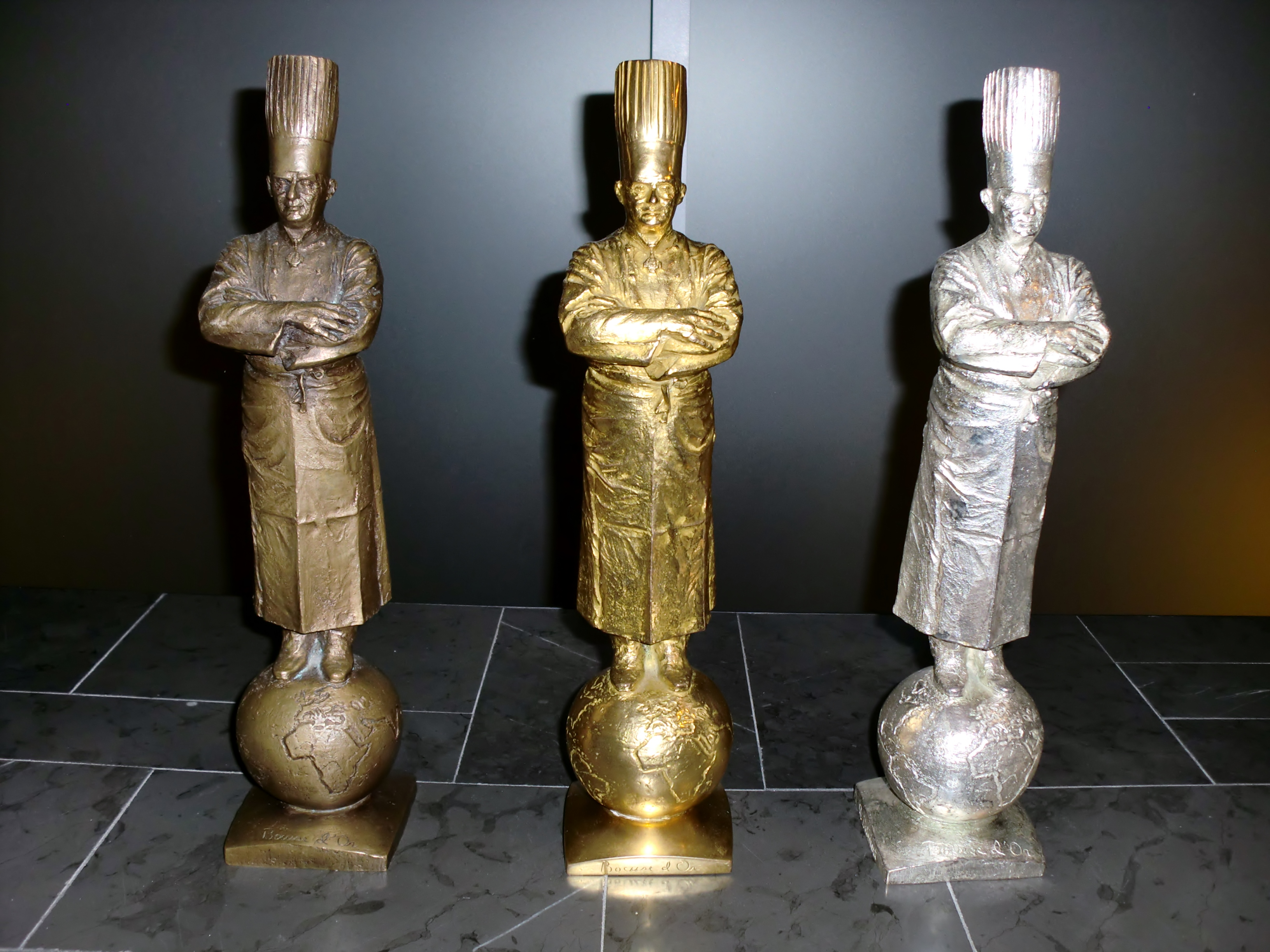
The Bocuse d'Or trophies

The chef with the highest overall score is awarded the Bocuse d'Or trophy, a golden effigy of Paul Bocuse in his chef's outfit, receiving the grand prize of €20,000. The Silver Bocuse medalist receives €15,000, and the Bronze Bocuse medalist receives €10,000. Additional prizes are awarded for the best fish and meat dishes, best national culinary identity, best apprentice and best posters.

=== 2013 rule changes ===
Ahead of the 2013 event, a set of alterations to the rules were announced in November 2012. In contrast to previous years when the fish and meat themes were announced six months ahead of the finals, the announcement of the fish theme was withheld until two months before the competition in order to "encourage the chefs to display even more creativity and spontaneity." At this time, other changes were announced concerning the allowed condiments, that "on the eve of the contest, the candidates will have 30 minutes to choose seasonal fruit and vegetables from the five continents market" to prepare two of the three garnishes in the contest, and the third garnish would be "typical of the candidates’ respective countries," with an aim to "highlight the different national culinary heritages and encourage diversity".

Further changes describe that the candidates with their coach and commis, having acquired the ingredients, "will have one hour in which to design and write down the recipe for their dish". Finally, the competitions depart from the large tray presentation format of previous years as the candidates this time are required to prepare fourteen plates "in order to remain close to the actual restaurant environment."

== Medalists ==
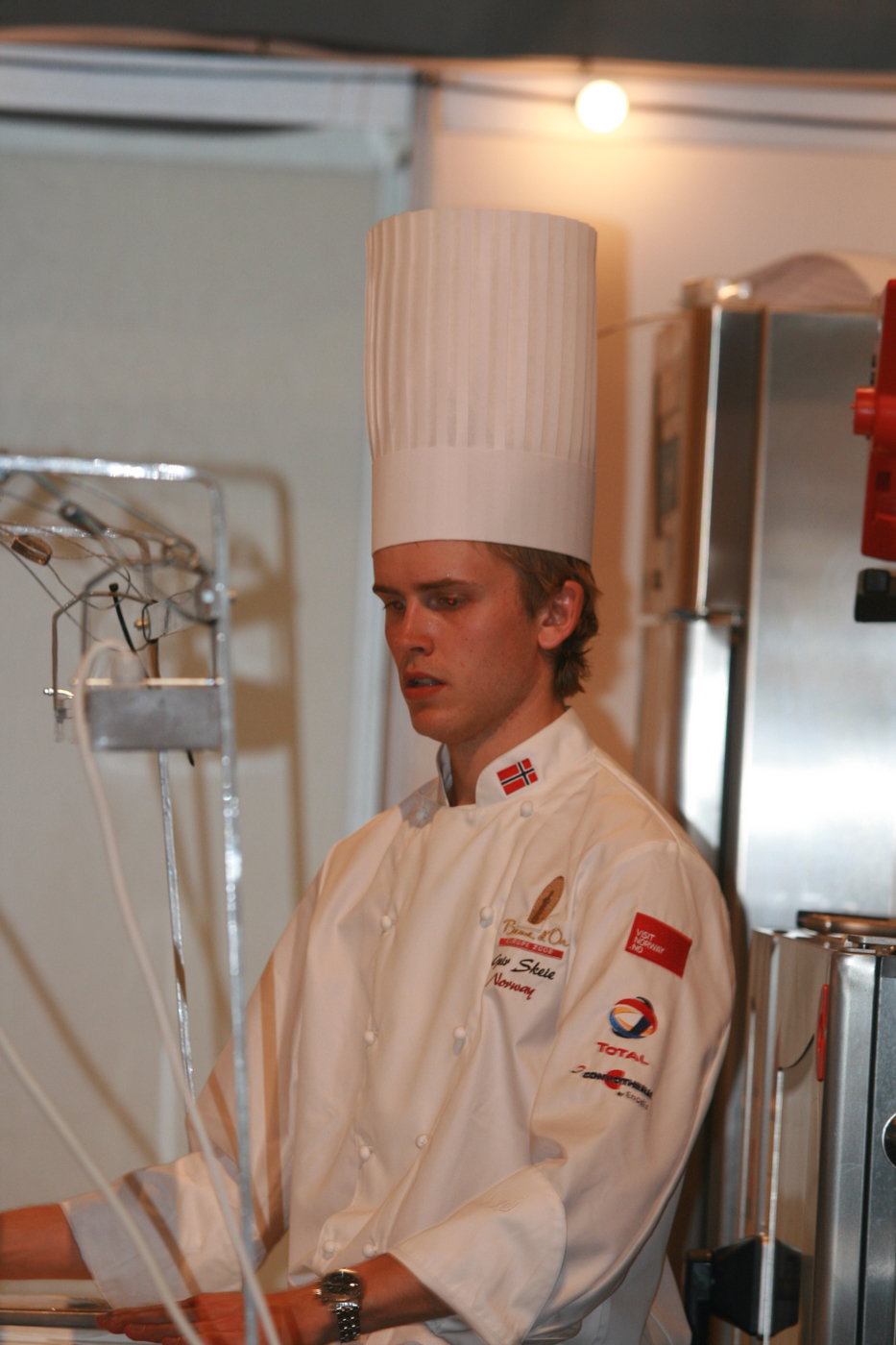
Geir Skeie, winner of the 2008 Bocuse d'Or Europe and 2009 Bocuse d'Or

Year	Bocuse d'Or	Silver Bocuse	Bronze Bocuse
1987	(France) Jacky Freon	(Belgium) Michel Addons	(Germany) Hans Haas
1989	(Luxembourg) Léa Linster	(Belgium) Pierre Paulus	(Singapore) William Wai
1991	(France) Michel Roth	(Norway) Lars Erik Underthun	(Belgium) Gert Jan Raven
1993	(Norway) Bent Stiansen	(Denmark) Jens Peter Kolbeck	(Belgium) Guy Van Cauteren
1995	(France) Régis Marcon	(Sweden) Melker Andersson	(Germany) Patrick Jaros
1997	(Sweden) Matthias Dahlgren	(Belgium) Roland Debuyst	(Norway) Odd Ivar Solvold
1999	(Norway) Terje Ness	(France) Yannick Alleno	(Belgium) Ferdy Debecker
2001	(France) François Adamski	(Sweden) Henrik Norström	(Iceland) Hákon Már Örvarsson
2003	(Norway) Charles Tjessem	(France) Frank Putelat	(Germany) Claus Weitbrecht
2005	(France) Serge Vieira	(Norway) Tom Victor Gausdal	(Denmark) Rasmus Kofoed
2007	(France) Fabrice Desvignes	(Denmark) Rasmus Kofoed	(Switzerland) Frank Giovannini
2009	(Norway) Geir Skeie	(Sweden) Jonas Lundgren	(France) Philippe Mille
2011	(Denmark) Rasmus Kofoed	(Sweden) Tommy Myllymäki	(Norway) Gunnar Hvarnes
2013	(France) Thibaut Ruggeri	(Denmark) Jeppe Foldager	(Japan) Noriyuki Hamada
2015	(Norway) Ørjan Johannessen	(United States) Philip Tessier	(Sweden) Tommy Myllymäki
2017	(United States) Mathew Peters	(Norway) Christopher William Davidsen	(Iceland) Viktor Örn Andrésson
2019	(Denmark) Kenneth Toft-Hansen	(Sweden) Sebastian Gibrand	(Norway) Christian André Pettersen
2021	(France) Davy Tissot	(Denmark) Ronni Vexøe Mortensen	(Norway) Christian André Pettersen
2023	(Denmark) Brian Mark Hansen	(Norway) Filip August Bendi	(Hungary) Bence Dalnoki
2025	(France) Paul Marcon	(Denmark) Sebastian Holberg Svendsgaard	(Sweden) Gustav Leonhardt
