= Bent Stiansen =

Norwegian chef

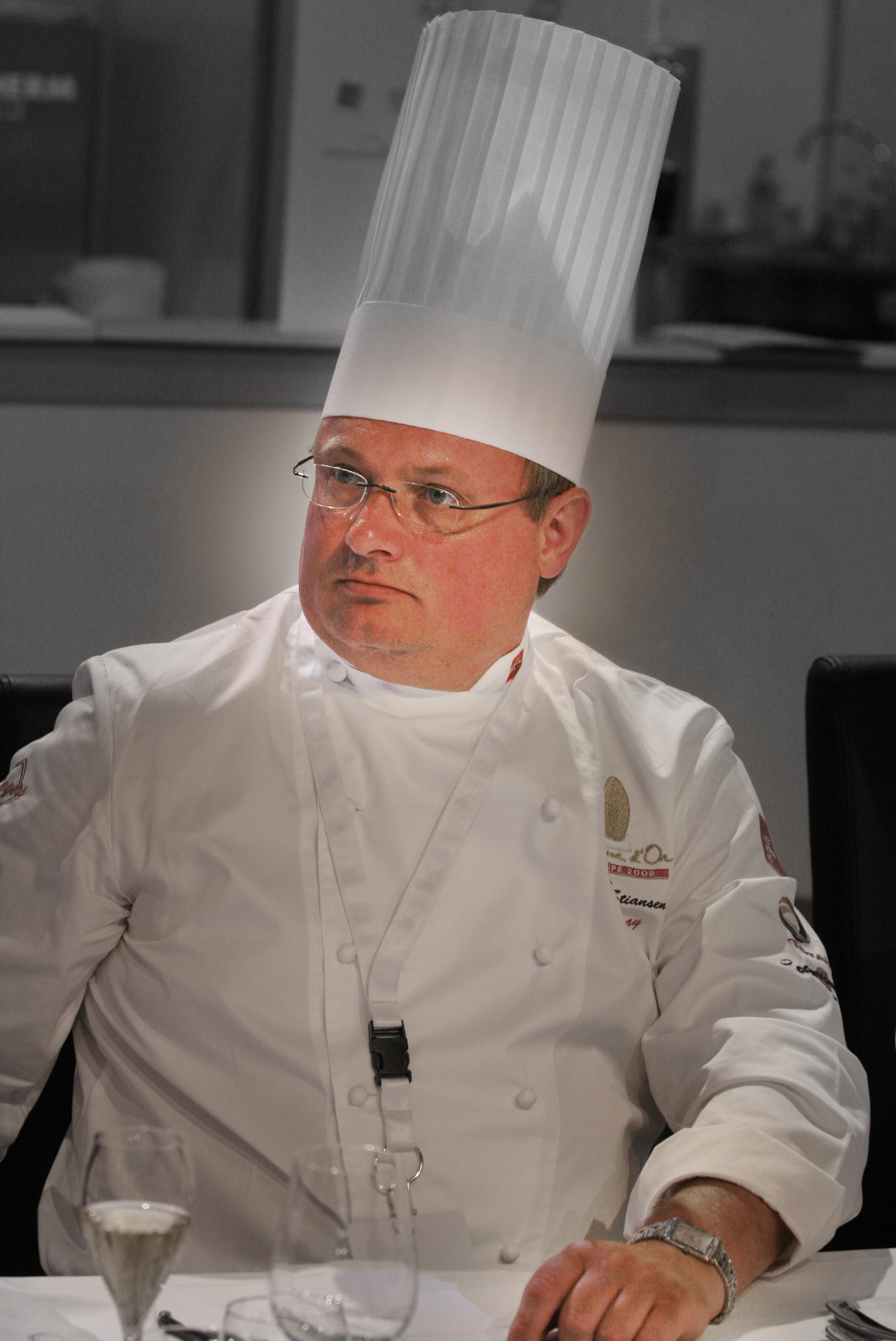
- Born: 18 June 1963 (age 61); Arendal, Norway
- Culinary career
- Rating(s): Michelin stars
- Current restaurant(s): Statholdergaarden
- Award(s) won: Gold medal (Bocuse d'or) 1993
- Website: www.statholdergaarden.no

Bent Stiansen (born 18 June 1963 in Arendal, Norway) is a Norwegian chef, who in 1993 became the first Scandinavian gold medal winner of the Bocuse d'Or.

In 1994, with his Danish wife Anette, he established the restaurant Statholdergaarden in Oslo, which they ran together until her death in May 2010. It is merited with one Michelin star, and its wine selection rated "Best of Award of Excellence" by Wine Spectator. In conjunction with the restaurant, located beneath there is also a more informal restaurant, Statholderens Mat & vinkjeller, at the former Oslo lodgings of Tordenskjold.

== Bibliography ==
- Stiansen til hverdags (2004)
- Stiansens kulinariske koffert (2006)
- Stiansens desserter (2006)
- Stiansens fisk og skalldyr (2006)
- Stiansens kjøtt og fjærkre (2006)
- Stiansens småretter (2006)
- Stiansen inviterer til fest (2008)
- "Alene hjemme" (2012)
