= Bon (disambiguation) =

Bon or Bön is a Tibetan religious tradition.

Bon or BON may also refer to:

== Places ==
- Bon, Amur Oblast, Russia
- Cape Bon, a peninsula in Tunisia
- Bon, Iran (disambiguation), places in Iran

== People ==
- Bon (surname)
- Bhakti Hridaya Bon (or Swami Bon; 1901–1982), Hindu guru
- Bon Scott (1946–1980), Australian singer-songwriter

== Religion ==
- Bon Lamaism, the religion tradition of Tamang people
- Bon Festival, Japanese Buddhist holiday to honor the spirits of deceased ancestors

== Computing ==
- Business Object Notation, notation for high-level object-oriented analysis

== Transportation ==
- Bolton Interchange, Greater Manchester, England, UK (National Rail station code BON)
- Bonbeach railway station, Melbourne, Australia (station code BON)
- Flamingo International Airport, Bonaire, Netherlands Antilles (IATA airport code BON)
- North Station, Boston, Massachusetts, USA (Amtrak station code BON)

== Other ==
- Band Ohne Namen (B.O.N.), German music group
- Bon (finance), a type of paper currency used in the 19th century
- The Bon Marché, a famous department store in Seattle also known as The Bon
- Bon Ice, Latin American liquid candy product
- Bisphosphonate-associated osteonecrosis of the jaw, aka BON of the jaw
- Bankon language, also known as Bon, Abo, Abaw, Bo
- Blue Ocean Network, an English-language television news channel based in China
- "B.O.N.", the periodical of the 48 Air School, Woodbrook, East London, Eastern Cape, South Africa; see List of British Commonwealth Air Training Plan facilities in South Africa
- Time Patrol Bon, a Japanese manga series

== See also ==
- Bøn, village in Norway
- Bonn, Cologne/Bonn Region, Germany
- Bonn (disambiguation)
- Le Bon (disambiguation)
- Bon Accord (disambiguation)
- Boen (disambiguation)
- Bons (disambiguation)
