= Bonn (surname) =

Bonn is a German surname. Notable people with the surname include:

- Ferdinand Bonn (1861–1933), German actor
- Gisela Bonn (1909–1996), German journalist, writer, environmental activist and Indologist
- Herb Bonn (1916–1943), American basketball player
- John Hillric Bonn (1829–1891), American railroad executive
- Leo Bonn (1850–1929), German-born British banker and philanthropist
- Skeeter Bonn (1923–1994), American country singer-songwriter and guitarist
