= Harold Hartley =

Harold Hartley may refer to:

- Harold Hartley (chemist) (1878–1972), British physical chemist
- Harold Hartley (businessman) (1851–1943), British journalist, publisher and mineral water manufacturer
- Harold Hartley (politician) (1875–1958), Australian politician, member of the Queensland Legislative Assembly
