= Bons =

Bons or BONS may refer to:

== Places ==
- Les Bons, Andorra; a village
- Bons-en-Chablais, a commune in Chablais, Haute-Savoie department, Auvergne-Rhône-Alpes region, France; formerly a village of Chablais province, Savoie duchy
- Bons, Bons-Tassilly commune, Calvados department, Normandy region, France; a village
- Bons, Chazey-Bons commune, Ain department, Auvergne-Rhône-Alpes region, France; a parish

== Other uses ==
- Hélène Bons (1903–1999), French athlete
- Blue Origin New Shepard (BO-NS), a suborbital space tourist rocket

== See also ==
- Bon (disambiguation), for the singular of Bons or BONs
