= Nicomatic SA =

Electronics manufacturer

- Nicomatic SA logo
- Type: Private
- Industry: Electronics
- Founded: 1976
- Founder: Paul Nicollin
- Headquarters: Bons-en-Chablais, France
- Key people: Olivier and Julien Nicollin (CEO)
- Revenue: € 38 million (2018)
- Subsidiaries: North America, China, India, UK, Germany, South Korea, Japan, Turkey, Singapore, Taiwan, Canada.
- Website: nicomatic.com

Nicomatic SA is a French and multinational manufacturer of electronic standard and specific connectors based in Bons-en-Chablais, France.

Nicomatic India at 9th Bengaluru Space Expo 2026, BIEC

== History ==
Nicomatic invented the CMM 220 Mixed Layout PCB micro-connector system. This system was created for defence purposes in addition to its aerospace and transportation applications. Other notable applications have included flight controls, IFES, HUDs, missiles, FADEC units, radars, satellites, engine controls, electro-optical sighting systems, mobile radios and power supplies.

Nicomatic connectors have been used on the Jade Rabbit, the lunar robot of the Chinese Space Program that has landed on the moon on December 14, 2013.

In 2014, the company invested five million euro in the construction of an extension of 2 500 m² of its headquarters (production facilities and offices), which adds to the existing 4 200 m2. Nicomatic devotes 15% of its annual turnover to research and development. Nicomatic has an assembly plant in Horsham, Pennsylvania that builds parts for Boeing and Lockheed Martin. The company exports over 80% of its turnover (sales across 40 countries).

In its work with the CEA List Institute in 2014, Nicomatic developed a device that could be integrated into its connectors and detect / localize various defaults of a complex wire network. This device, called Orthogonal Multi-tone Time Domain Reflectometry (OMTDR), puts together reflectometry & communication to allow to carry on preventive maintenance as well as breakdown detection in networks.

The company developed micro connectors that went on to become a part of the Euro-Russian space mission known as ExoMars which was launched from Baikonur Cosmodrome on March 14. Nicomatic is listed as number 41 independent French SMEs on ETI foreign markets, 2015.

Nicomatic is certified ISO9001:2015 and EN9100:2016 for aerospace and defense. Nicomatic is member of the French GIFAS, of EDEN Aerospace Cluster, and is part of the Mont-Blanc Excellence Industries network.
