= Eldorado Amusement Park =

Defunct amusement park in New Jersey

Eldorado Amusement Park was a 25-acre (10.12 ha) amusement park that opened in 1891 in the Highwood Park section of Weehawken, New Jersey. It operated as an amusement grounds through 1894, after which time the main building, the Casino, was used to host boxing matches and other athletic events and vaudeville performances. A massive fire in the early morning of November 4, 1898, destroyed the building.

== Founding ==
Eldorado was formed by local prominent political and business leaders through the creation of the Palisades Amusement and Exhibition Company with Bolossy Kiralfy, one of the Kiralfy Brothers, being named as General Manager/Amusement Director. One of the principals of the company was Hillric J. Bonn; he was the founder of street railways and he directly or indirectly owned large parcels of land in Hudson County, New Jersey.

The Palisades Amusement And Exhibition Company also published the show program for Auguste Francioli's Egypt Through Centuries in 1892.

== Attractions and themes ==
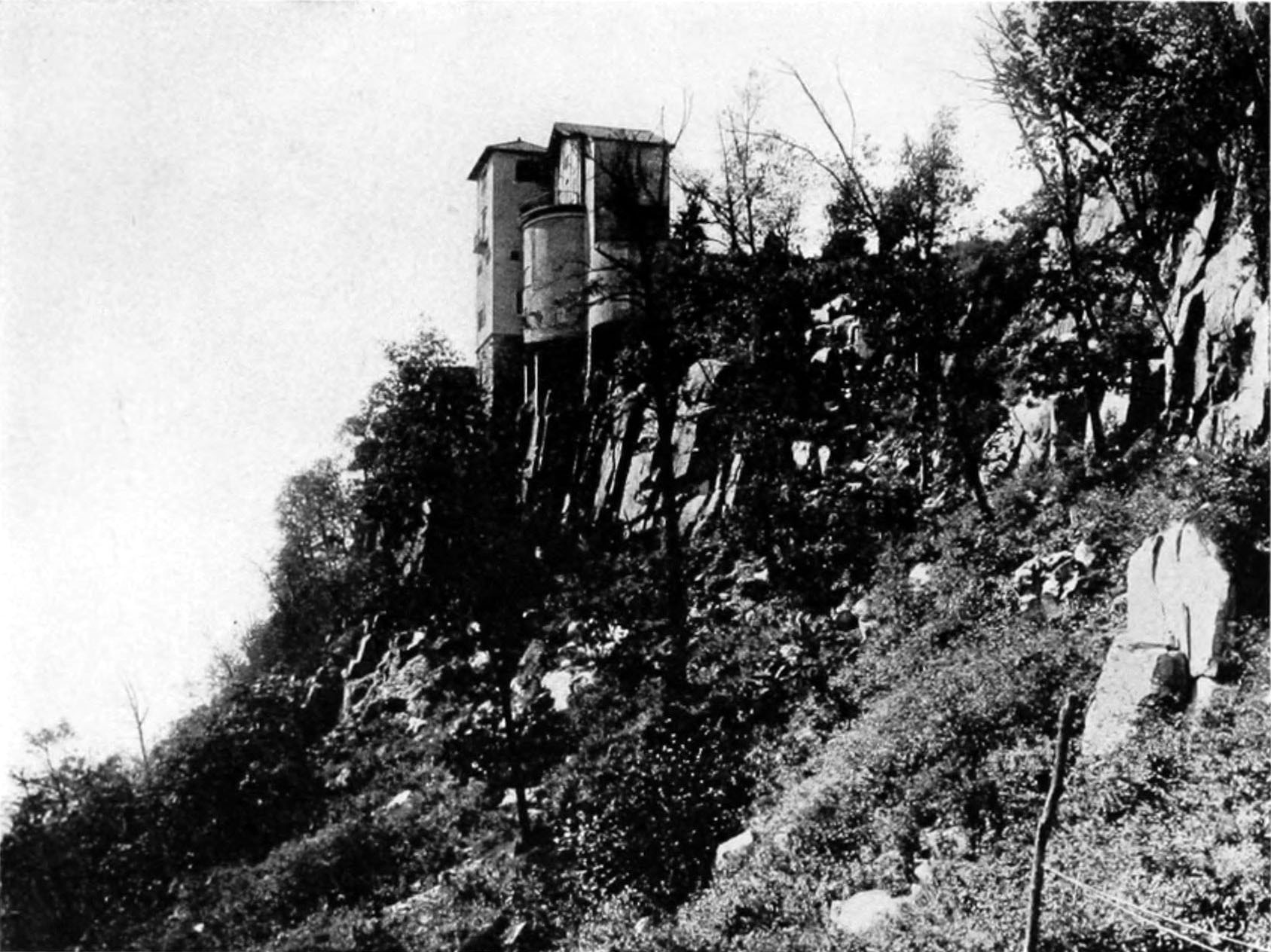
Karl Bitter Weehawken home

In 1891, Kiralfy's King Solomon's Mine was the opening production in the park's amphitheater Augusto Francioli's 'Egypt Through Centuries' was the theater's 1892 season show, one of numerous Egyptian Theaters of the 19th and 20th centuries in America. The five acts depicting 110 years of Egyptian history depicted, in some part, the virgin sacrifice to Osiris. Kiralfy's King Solomon show was also produced during the Eldorado's 1893 season.

The park stated it was "the most beautiful amusement resort in the world" with the amphitheatre having a claimed seating capacity from 12,000 or 15,000 persons.

== Subsequent use ==
The park was the location of "The Castle" which was the studio of Karl Bitter until 1898. Residential neighborhoods and commercial development now occupy the original area.

== See also ==
- Palisades Amusement Park
- North Hudson County Railway
- Bergen Hill
