= Joseph Lyons (caterer) =

English entrepreneur

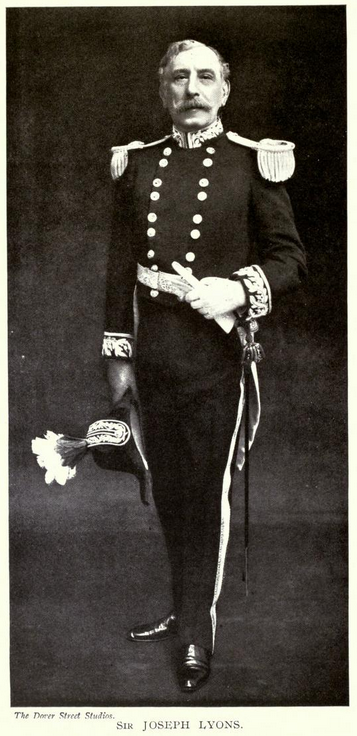
Sir Joseph Lyons DL, in a photograph published in 1914, wearing the uniform of Deputy Lieutenant of the County of London

Sir Joseph Nathaniel Lyons DL (29 December 1847 – 22 June 1917) was an English entrepreneur and pioneer of mass catering. He was the chairman and co-founder of J. Lyons and Co., a restaurant chain, food manufacturing and hotel conglomerate created in 1884 that dominated British mass-catering in the first half of the twentieth century.

== Early life ==
Lyons was born in Kennington, London, on 29 December 1847, the son of Nathaniel Lyons, "an itinerant vendor of watches and cheap jewellery", and Hannah Cohen, his wife. He was educated at the Borough Jewish Schools in London's East End.

== Early career ==
Lyons began his career as an optician's apprentice. He had an ingenious mechanical bent and invented small gadgets that he was able to sell quickly at the many exhibitions held throughout Great Britain in the late nineteenth century, using his skills in showmanship and sales. One was a combined "microscope-binocular-compass" that he sold for one shilling from a stall at the Royal Jubilee Exhibition Liverpool in 1887.

== Catering ==
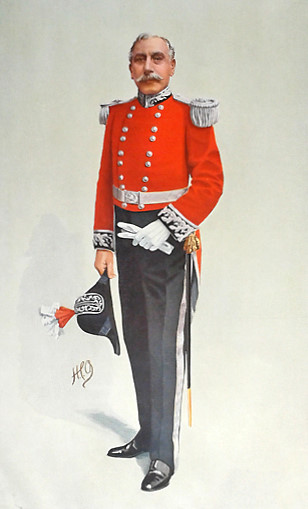
Caricature of Lyons in Vanity Fair, March 1910

When Isidore Gluckstein (1851–1920), Montague Gluckstein (1854–1922) and Barnett Salmon (1829–1897), who headed the Salmon & Gluckstein tobacco merchants, wanted to expand into catering, they invited Lyons to join them but used his name for the company, as they thought that associating their family names with catering would be beneath them; Lyons was distantly related to Isidore Gluckstein's fiancée.

A trial tea pavilion was run at the Newcastle Jubilee Exhibition of 1887 which was so successful that in that year a private company was incorporated to develop the business. The company took space at the 1888 International Exhibition of Science, Art and Industry in Glasgow and the Exposition Universelle of 1889 in Paris, after which it took over catering at Olympia (1891), the Crystal Palace, and the White City, all in London. A public company, J. Lyons & Co. Ltd., was formed in 1894 and the first Lyons' teashop was opened that year in Piccadilly, London, which eventually grew into a chain known as Lyons' Corner Houses. Lyons was made chairman of the company for life.

He was chairman of the Strand Palace Hotel, part of the Lyons and Gluckstein interests, where he introduced a "no-tip" policy to great success.

== Exhibitions ==
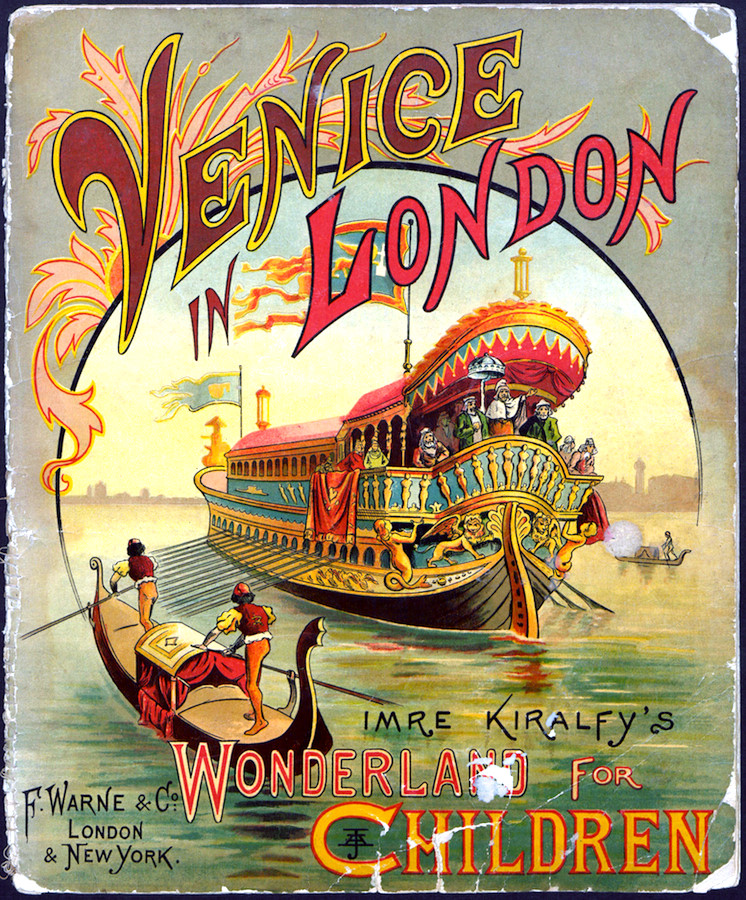
Programme for Venice in London, Olympia, 1891–93

Around 1891, Lyons met Harold Hartley, an entrepreneurial publisher and mineral water manufacturer. As Hartley told it in his memoirs, Eighty-eight: Not Out (1939):

One evening later on Lyons, who had never travelled, asked me if I had ever been to Venice, as he had an idea that it might be reproduced with its canals in an attractive form. Being well acquainted with Venice, I at once realised its possibilities and thus "Venice in London" was born. Visions of the Grand Canal, with its churches, palaces, and gondolas flashed through my mind.

Between 1891 and 1893 they staged Venice in London, a spectacular, at the Olympia, which combined catering by Lyons, entertainments and opportunities to purchase souvenirs with a stage show. Theatrical impresario Imre Kiralfy, who specialised in such events, designed and directed the show and lent his name to the production to increase its public appeal. It required the import of 100 gondolas from Venice with Venetian gondoliers. According to The Times, 4,893,980 people visited the event in its first year with 24,737 visiting on Boxing Day 1892.

== Personal life ==
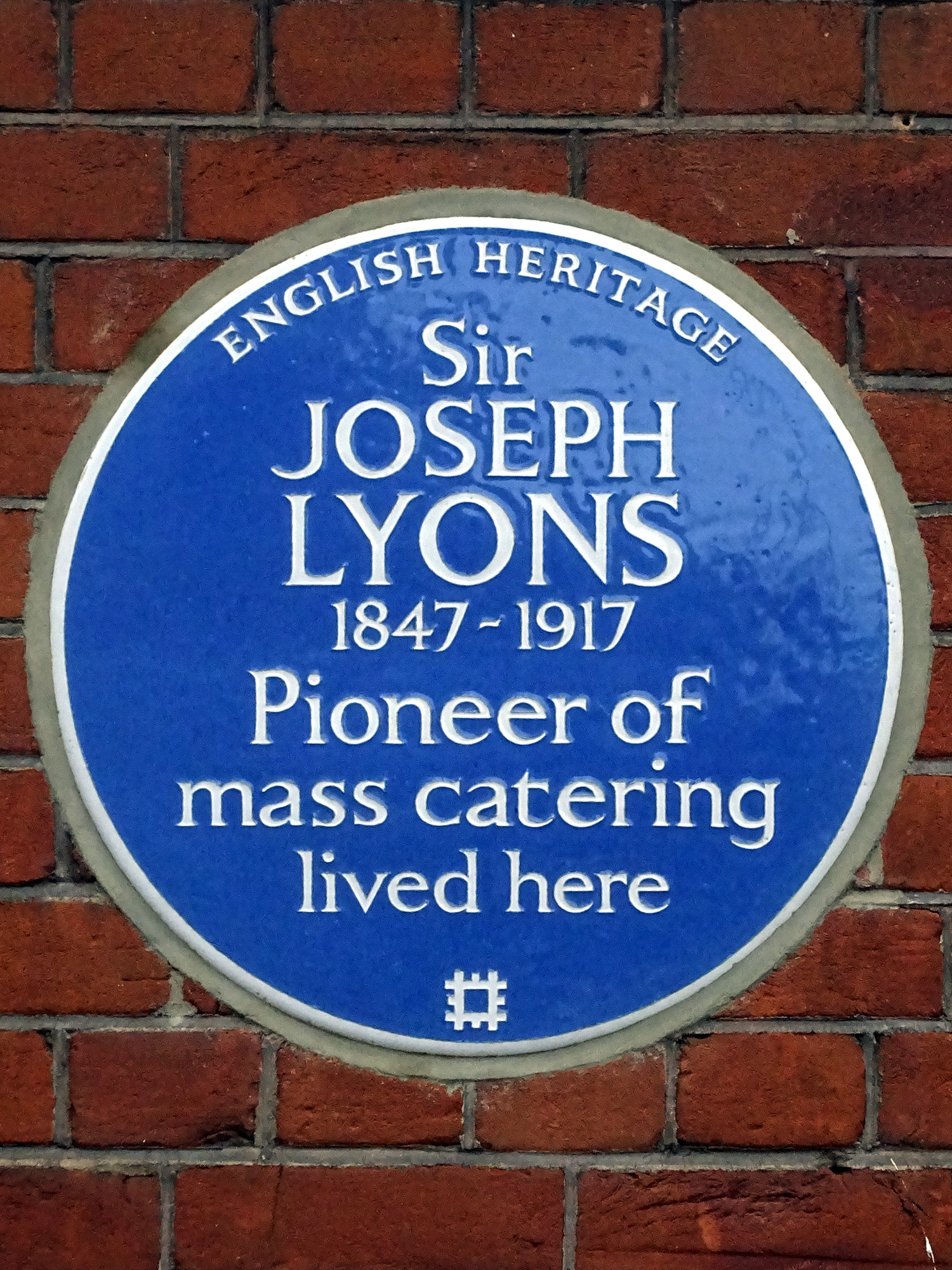
Commemorative blue plaque to Lyons at 11a Palace Mansions, Hammersmith Road, London

Lyons married Psyche Cohen, the daughter of Isaac Cohen, who was the manager of the Pavilion Theatre in London's Whitechapel Road. They did not have any children.

He was an accomplished watercolourist who showed his paintings at the Royal Institution where they were bought by Sir Spencer Wells, surgeon to Queen Victoria, and Admiral Earldey-Wilmot, commander of the Channel Fleet. He also wrote short novels with the dramatist Cecil Raleigh.

He was a member of the General Purposes Committee of the Territorial Association and was responsible for adding athletics to the Territorial Army's training regime. His charitable activity was directed to the Little Sisters of the Poor in London's Hammersmith, and the Music Hall Benevolent Fund.

Lyons was a Deputy Lieutenant of the County of London. His firm catered for royal garden parties at Buckingham Palace and enjoyed a royal warrant. He was knighted for public services in 1911.

== Death ==
Lyons died at the Hyde Park Hotel, Knightsbridge, on 22 June 1917 and was buried at the cemetery of the United Synagogue, Willesden. He was survived by his wife.

== Legacy ==
Lyons is remembered in a blue plaque at 11a Palace Mansions, Hammersmith Road, West Kensington, London, inscribed "Sir Joseph Lyons 1847–1917 Pioneer of mass catering lived here". An adjacent street, originally part of Blythe Road, is called Lyons Walk after him.
