= Lebon (surname) =

Lebon is a French surname. Notable people with the surname include:

- Bart LeBon (born 1952/1953), American politician
- Christophe Lebon (born 1982), French swimmer
- Cornélie Lebon-de Brambilla (1767-1812), Belgian born French engineer, wife of Phillipe
- David Lebón (born 1952), Argentine musician
- Karine Lebon (born 1985), French politician
- Philippe LeBon (1767–1804), French engineer, husband of Cornélie

== See also ==
- Lebrón (surname)
- Le Bon
- Lebon (disambiguation)
