= Lebon =

Lebon or LeBon may refer to:

== Other uses ==
- Lebon Patisserie & Café, a defunct historic pastry shop and café in Istanbul, Turkey
- Lebon, Port-Salut, Haiti, a village in the Sud Department of Haiti
- Lebon Régis, municipality of Brazil
- 10838 Lebon, an asteroid
- Stade Lebon, a multi-use stadium in Angoulême, France
- Lebon (surname)

== See also ==
- Le Bon (disambiguation)
- Lebrón (surname)
- Bon (disambiguation)
