= Bonn (disambiguation) =

Bonn is a city on the banks of the Rhine in the German state of North Rhine-Westphalia, with a population of over 300,000.

Bonn may also refer to:

== Agreements ==
- Bonn Agreement (1969), a European environmental agreement
- Bonn Agreement (Afghanistan), the initial series of agreements intended to re-create the State of Afghanistan
- Bonn Agreement (Christianity), a formal affirmation which established full communion between the Church of England and those of the Union of Utrecht
- Convention on the Conservation of Migratory Species of Wild Animals (also the Bonn Convention), an international agreement that aims to conserve migratory species within their migratory ranges

== People ==
- Ferdinand Bonn (1861–1933), German stage and film actor
- Gisela Bonn (1909–1996), German journalist, writer, environmental activist and Indologist
- Herb Bonn (1916–1943), American professional basketball player and World War II fighter pilot
- John Hillric Bonn (1829–1891), first president of the North Hudson County Railway
- Skeeter Bonn (1923–1994), singer and guitar player

== Places ==
- Bonn, Ohio, an unincorporated community in Washington County, in the U.S. state of Ohio
- Bonn, Victoria, a parish within the county of Rodney, Victoria, Australia
- Bonn Square, a city square in Oxford, England
- West Germany (also the Bonn Republic), the Federal Republic of Germany between its formation on 23 May 1949 and German reunification on 3 October 1990

== Other uses ==
- Bonn (TV series), a 2023 German historical drama television series
- Bonn Hauptbahnhof, a railway station located on the left bank of the Rhine along the Cologne–Mainz line
- Bonn Minster, a Roman Catholic church in Bonn
- Bonn Stadtbahn, a part of the local public transit system in Bonn and the surrounding Rhein-Sieg area
- German auxiliary Bonn, the third ship of the Berlin-class replenishment ships of the German Navy
