= Boen =

Boen may refer to:

== People ==
- Earl Boen (1941–2023), American film, television and voice actor
- Haldor Boen (1851–1912), American congressman
- Yvonne Marie Boen, alleged victim of Robert Pickton (born 1967), Canadian serial killer

== Places ==
- Boën-sur-Lignon, France

== See also ==
- Bon (disambiguation)
