= Bon Accord =

Bon Accord may refer to:

== Australia ==
- Bon Accord, Queensland, a locality in the North Burnett Region
- Bon Accord railway station, a closed railway station in New South Wales

== Canada ==
- Bon Accord, Alberta, a town

== Caribbean ==
- Bon Accord River, Grenada

== Scotland ==
=== Aberdeen ===
- Bon Accord (motto), the ancient motto of Aberdeen
- Bon Accord Baths, a listed building and disused indoor swimming pool
- Bon Accord Centre, a shopping centre complex
- Bon Accord Free Church, a congregation of the Free Church of Scotland
- Bon Accord F.C., a former football (soccer) club
- Bon Accord F.C. (1890), a former football (soccer) club unrelated to the above

=== Elsewhere ===
- Shotts Bon Accord F.C., a Scottish football (soccer) club based in Shotts, North Lanarkshire

== South Africa ==
- Bon Accord Dam, Gauteng, South Africa
