= Pugieu =

Part of Chazey-Bons in Auvergne-Rhône-Alpes, France

- Part of Chazey-Bons
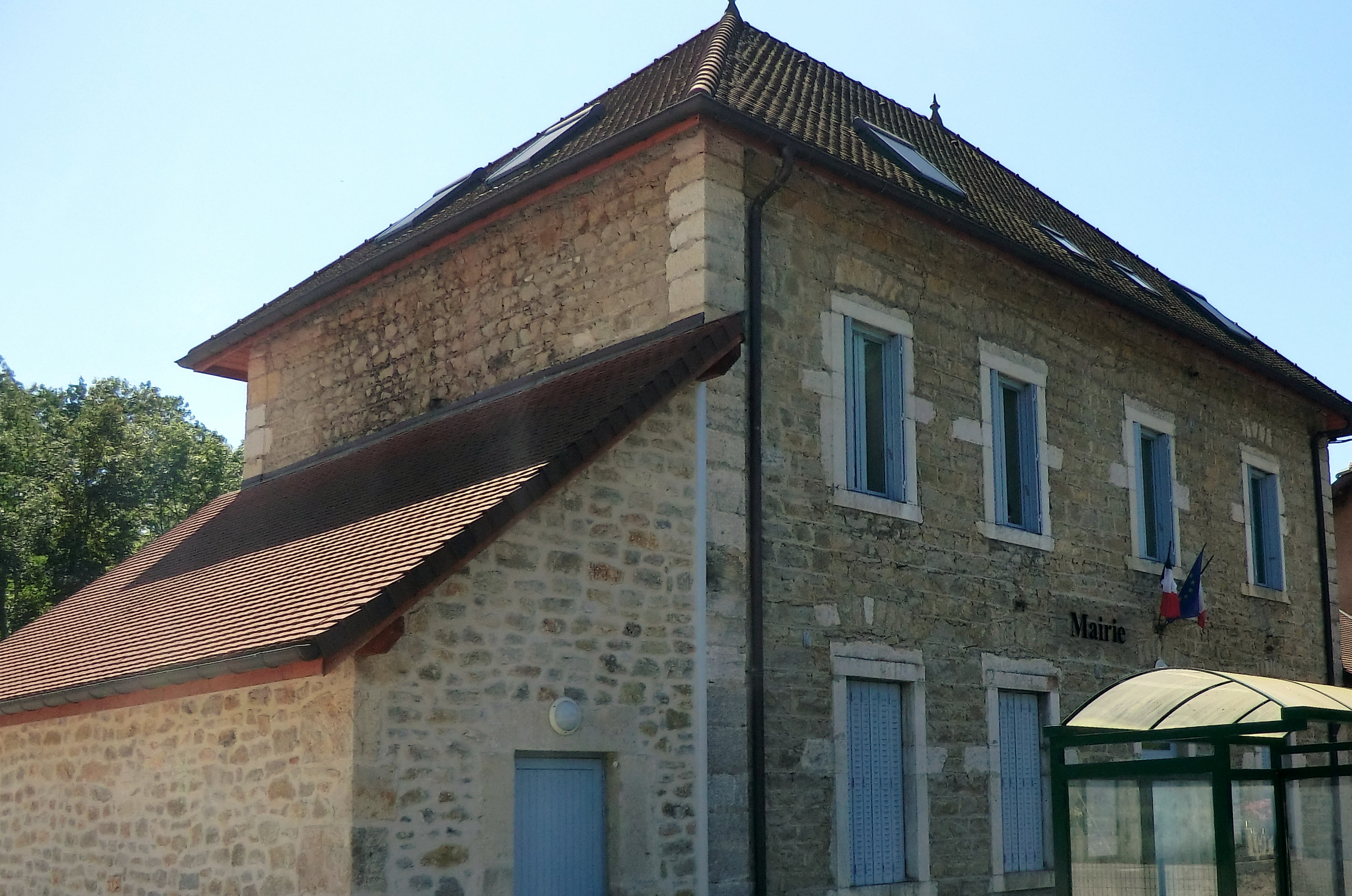
- Location of Pugieu
- Location within France Location within Auvergne-Rhône-Alpes
- Coordinates: 45°49′00″N 5°39′00″E
- Country: France
- Region: Auvergne-Rhône-Alpes
- Department: Ain
- Arrondissement: Belley
- Canton: Belley
- Commune: Chazey-Bons
- Area^{1}: 4.85 km^{2} (1.87 sq mi)
- Elevation: 245 m (804 ft)
- Highest elevation: 409 m (1,342 ft)
- Lowest elevation: 238 m (781 ft)
- Population (2018): 155
  - Density: 32.0/km^{2} (82.8/sq mi)
- Time zone: UTC+01:00 (CET)
  - Summer (DST): UTC+02:00 (CEST)
- Postal code: 01510
- ^{1} French Land Register data, which excludes lakes, ponds, glaciers > 1 km^{2} (0.386 sq mi or 247 acres) and river estuaries.

Pugieu (French pronunciation: [pyʒjø]) is a former commune in the Ain department in eastern France. On 1 January 2017, it was merged into the commune Chazey-Bons.

== Population ==
Historical population
Year	Pop.	±% p.a.
2006	128	—
2011	175	+6.45%
2018	155	−1.72%
Source: INSEE

== See also ==
- Communes of the Ain department
