= Harold Hartley (businessman) =

British journalist

Harold Thomas Hartley (28 October 1851 – 29 September 1943) was a British journalist, publisher, mineral water manufacturer, and professional organiser of exhibitions. He was closely associated with Joseph Lyons and the early development of the J. Lyons & Co. catering company. He was also a noted art collector and bibliophile.

== Early life and family ==
Harold Hartley was born in London on 28 October 1851, the eldest son of T.H.P. Hartley. He was educated at the City of London College. In 1878 he married Katie Brewer, the eldest daughter of Francis Brewer from which marriage he had a son, Harold Brewer Hartley (1878–1972), who had a distinguished career as a chemist and was knighted in 1928. Katie died in 1884 and Harold remarried, to the eldest daughter of the civil engineer Rowland Mason Ordish.

== Career ==
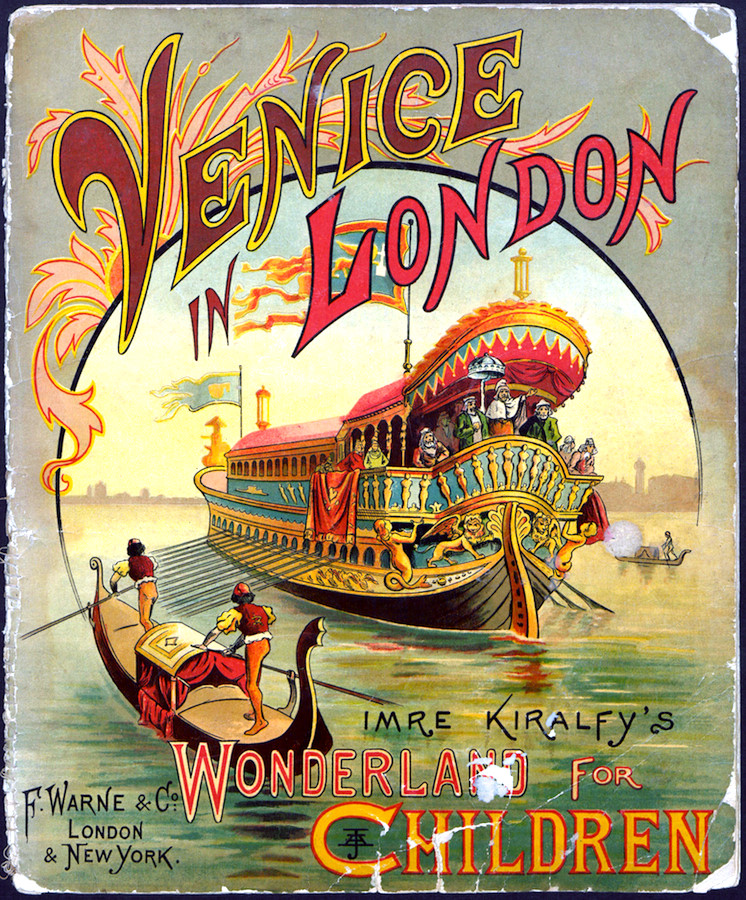
Program for Venice in London, Olympia, 1891–93.

Hartley's early career was in the wine trade and in trade journalism on Fleet Street on The Milk Journal (est. 1871). He was a partner in the firm of Emmott, Hartley & Company, publishers and founders of the Warehousemen and Drapers' Trade Journal (1872) and the Chambers of Commerce Chronicle (1876). He was early on involved in the world of exhibitions when he worked on advertising for the Vienna World Exposition of 1873.

He bought a partnership in an old mineral water firm and became the owner of the Pure Water Company. It was through supplying aerated water to the builders of the Imperial Institute (completed 1893), that he met Joseph Lyons. As Hartley told it in his memoirs, Eighty-eight: Not out (1939):

One evening later on Lyons, who had never travelled, asked me if I had ever been to Venice, as he had an idea that it might be reproduced with its canals in an attractive form. Being well acquainted with Venice, I at once realized its possibilities and thus "Venice in London" was born. Visions of the Grand Canal, with its churches, palaces, and gondolas flashed through my mind.

In 1891–93, with Lyons, he staged Venice in London at Olympia. The show was designed and directed by the theatrical impresario Imre Kiralfy who specialised in spectacular events and lent his name to the production to increase its appeal to the public. It required the import of 100 gondolas from Venice with Venetian gondoliers. Hartley went on to organise the Indian, Victorian Era, Greater Britain, and Military exhibitions.

He retired in 1909 rather than compete with the newly created White City.

== Collecting ==
Hartley collected a wide variety of printed material such as magazine illustrations, posters, manuscripts, letters and illustrated books. He owned letters from Oscar Wilde. He donated some prints and medals to the British Museum in 1925 and 1936 respectively. He also donated to other institutions, including the Fitzwilliam Museum in Cambridge and Tate, London. In 1955, his collection of illustrated books of the 1860s was sold by his son to the Museum of Fine Arts in Boston.

In 1903, he was one of the founders of The Burlington Magazine.

== Honours and positions ==
Hartley was a knight of the Order of St Sava of Serbia and a commander of the Order of Danilo of Montenegro. He was a life governor of the Charing Cross Hospital and a member of the Junior Constitutional Club and the Authors' Club.

== Death ==
He died on 29 September 1943. His residence at the time of his death was Brook House, North Stoke, Oxfordshire. He left an estate of £10,620 with probate granted to his son and Robert Woodbridge, solicitor.

== Selected publications ==
- Lewis Carroll and his artists and engravers. 1932.
- Eighty-eight: Not out: A record of happy memories. Muller, 1939.

== See also ==
- Frederick Sandys
