= Bon (surname) =

- Anna Bon, Russian/Italian composer and singer.
- Bartolomeo Bon, Italian sculptor and architect
- Bhakti Hridaya Bon (1901–1982), Indian guru
- François Bon (b. 1953), French novelist
- Louis André Bon (1758–1799), French general
- Marcel Bon (1925–2014), French mycologist
- Michel Bon (b. 1943), French businessman and politician
- Naftali Bon(1945–2018), Kenyan runner
- Piet Bon (b. 1946), Dutch rower
- Simon Bon (1904–1987), Dutch rower, father of Piet
- Bon Scott (1948–1980), deceased singer with AC/DC
- Léon van Bon (b. 1972), Dutch cyclist
- Jon Bon Jovi (b. 1962), American Singer with Bon Jovi
- William Bon Mardion (b. 1983), French ski mountaineer

== See also ==
- Bon (disambiguation)
