= Venice in London =

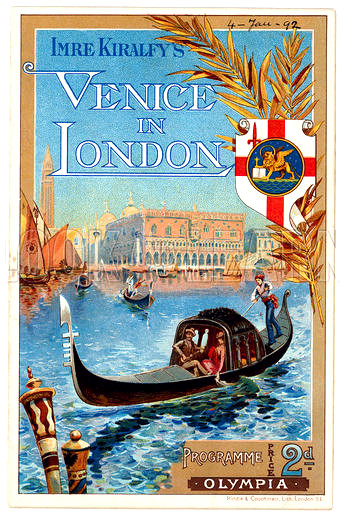
Programme for Venice in London

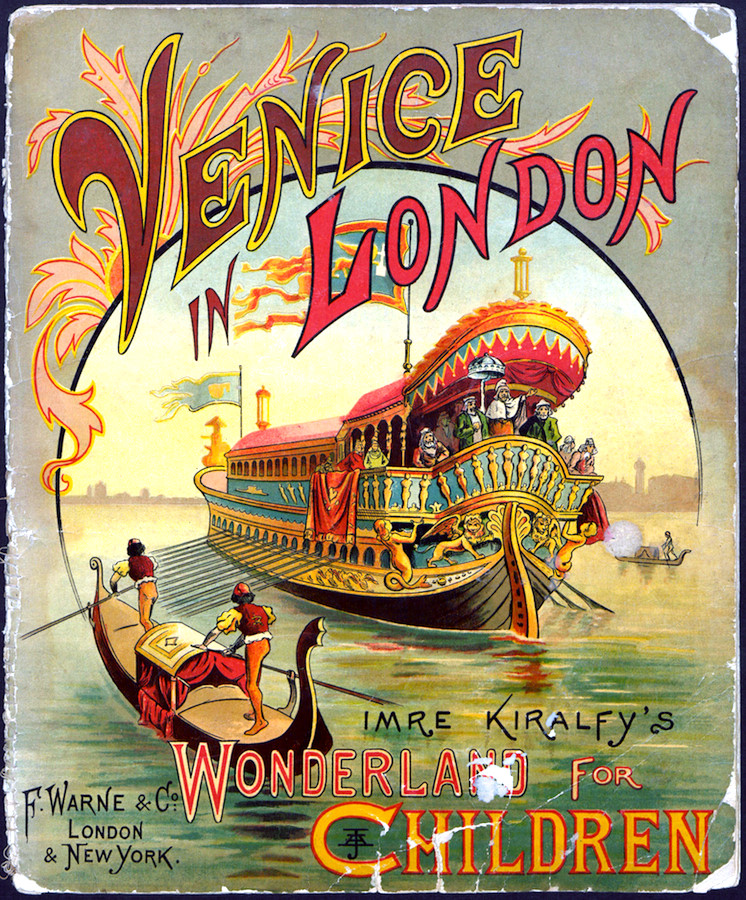
Alternate programme for Venice in London

Venice in London was a spectacular held at Olympia in London from 26 December 1891 to January 1893. It was also variously described as Venice The Bride of the Sea at Olympia, Venice at Olympia, etc.

== Genesis ==
The show was the brainchild of the caterer Joseph Lyons and his business partner Harold Hartley. Hartley, who owned the Pure Water Company, had met Lyons when supplying aerated water to the builders of the Imperial Institute (completed 1893). As Hartley told it in his memoirs, Eighty-eight Not Out (1939):

One evening later on Lyons, who had never travelled, asked me if I had ever been to Venice, as he had an idea that it might be reproduced with its canals in an attractive form. Being well acquainted with Venice, I at once realized its possibilities and thus "Venice in London" was born. Visions of the Grand Canal, with its churches, palaces, and gondolas flashed through my mind.

== The event ==
Through his firm J. Lyons and Co., Lyons and his business partners had the contract for the catering at Olympia. The event combined catering by Lyons, entertainments and opportunities to purchase souvenirs with a stage show designed and directed by the theatrical impresario Imre Kiralfy who specialised in spectacular events and lent his name to the production in order to increase its appeal to the public. It required the import of 100 gondolas from Venice with Venetian gondoliers. According to The Times, 4,893,980 people visited the event in its first year with 24,737 visiting on Boxing Day 1892.
