= Bolossy Kiralfy =

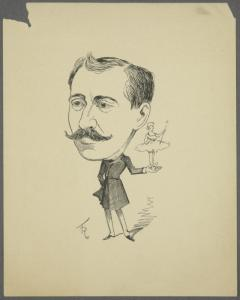
- Caricature of Bolossy Kiralfy
- Born: Balázs Königsbaum; January , 1848; Pest, Hungary, the Austrian Empire
- Died: 1932 (aged 83–84); London, England, the United Kingdom
- Occupations: Dancer, Director/Producer

Bolossy Kiralfy (1848–1932), one of The Kiralfy Brothers, was a performer, producer, writer and creator of musical extravaganzas in the late 19th, early 20th centuries. He was a "great international showman" and ushered in the "era of the Spectacle". Bolossy Kiralfy, born January 31, 1847, in Pest—(since 1873 incorporated with Buda and Óbuda into Budapest)—and died March 6, 1932, in London, England. Elise Marie Waldau, was his first wife which he married approximately 1874 and divorced 1899. His second wife, Helen (Nellie) Dawnay was married on November 23, 1899, in London, England.

== Productions and engagements ==
1892 - Engaged by Palisades Amusement and Exhibition Company to serve as the General Manager and Amusement Director of the Eldorado Amusement Park in Weehawken, New Jersey. For this production, he traveled to Europe to engage artists.

=== Humpty Dumpty ===
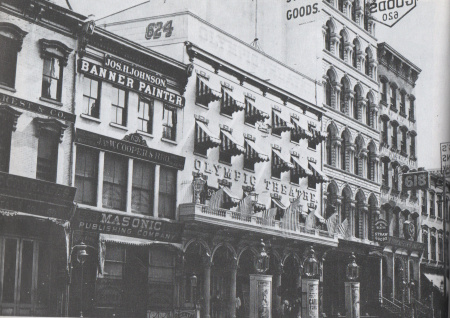
The Olympic opened in 1856 and was soon renamed Laura Keene's New Theatre, after the actress of the era (who starred in Our American Cousin at Ford's Theater in Washington the night President Lincoln was shot).

The pantomime musical broadway adaptation of nursery rhyme figure Humpty Dumpty debuted at the Olympic Theatre, (8/31/1871 - 6/11/1872), George L. Fox (clown), named stage manager in 1866, performed.

First Preview:		Total Previews:	
Opening Date:	Aug 31, 1871		
Closing Date:	Jun 11, 1872	Total Performances:	333

=== Siege of Troy ===
Siege of Troy Production : The Siege of Troy from the Trojan War performed.

=== The Orient ===
"The Orient" was an outdoor musical spectacle performed at the Toronto Industrial Exhibition of 1902 in Toronto, Canada.

=== A Carnival in Venice ===
Kiralfy followed up his 1902 spectacle with the 'A Carnival in Venice' outdoor spectacle at the Toronto fair, performing Italian music as though you were at a carnival in Venice. The stage backdrop was the cityscape of Venice and the Adriatic palaces. Songs would be performed by choruses in gondolas; the musicians and instrumentalists on an island.
