= Le Bon =

Le Bon (French for "the Good") may refer to:

- Fulk II, Count of Anjou (circa 905–960), nicknamed Foulques le Bon
- John II of France (1319–1364), nicknamed Jehan le Bon
- Philip the Good (1396–1467), Duke of Burgundy; in French Philippe le Bon
- Joseph Le Bon (1765–1795), French politician
- Philippe LeBon (1767–1804), French engineer
- Gustave Le Bon (1841–1931), French social psychologist, sociologist, and amateur physicist
- Simon Le Bon (born 1958), singer with Duran Duran
- Yasmin Le Bon (born 1964), British fashion model
- Cate Le Bon (born 1983), Welsh singer
- Charlotte Le Bon (born 1986), Canadian actress

== See also ==
- Lebon (disambiguation)
- Bon
