= Harold Hartley (chemist) =

British physical chemist (1878–1972)

Sir Harold Hartley GCVO CH CBE MC FRS
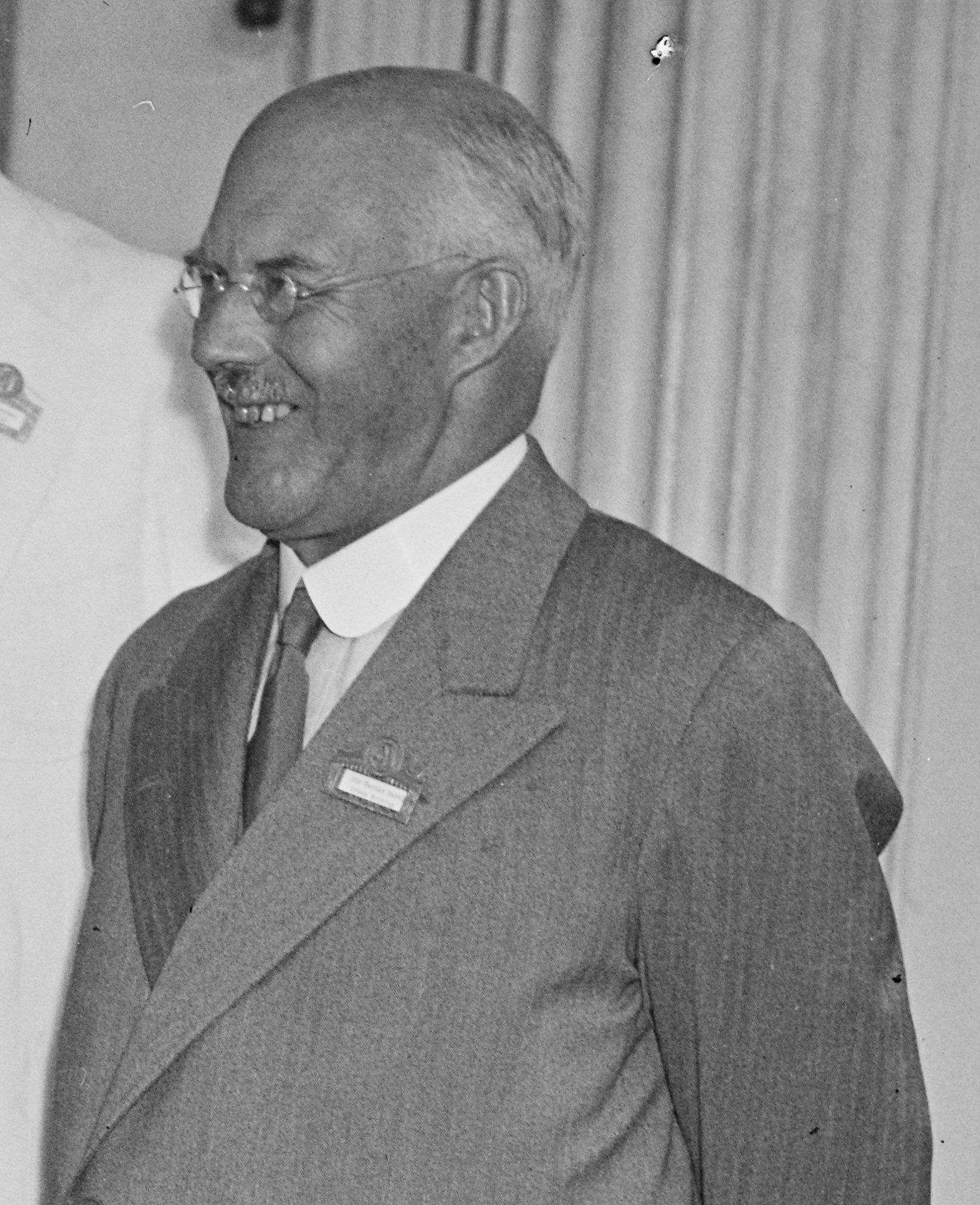
- Hartley at the White House in 1936
- Born: Harold Brewer Hartley; 3 September 1878; London, England
- Died: 9 September 1972 (aged 94)
- Education: Balliol College, Oxford
- Known for: "physical and mineralogical chemistry, including electrical conductivity, ionisation, and electrolytic equilibria in aqueous and non-aqueous solutions"
- Awards: Wilhelm Exner Medal (1937); Hoover Medal (1968)
- Scientific career
- Fields: Physical chemistry, mineralogical chemistry
- Workplaces: Balliol College, Oxford
- Doctoral advisor: Sir John Conroy
- Doctoral students: E. J. Bowen; Cyril Hinshelwood

Signature
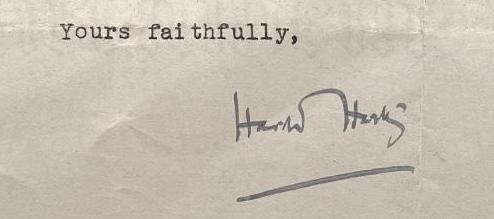

Brigadier-General Sir Harold Brewer Hartley GCVO CH CBE MC FRS (3 September 1878 – 9 September 1972) was a British physical chemist. He moved from academia to important positions in business and industry, including serving as Chairman of the British Overseas Airways Corporation.

== Early life ==
He was the only child of the collector and bibliophile Harold T. Hartley (1851–1943). His mother died in 1884 when he was a young child and his father later remarried. The future academic was educated at Dulwich College, and Balliol College, Oxford, graduating from the latter in 1900 with a first in natural science. As a tutor at Balliol, he supervised the research of Edmund Bowen and Cyril Hinshelwood.

== First World War ==
Hartley served in the First World War and was awarded the Military Cross.

== Honours ==
He was appointed an Officer of the Order of the British Empire in the 1918 Birthday Honours. He was Bedford Lecturer in Physical Chemistry, at Balliol College, University of Oxford. He was knighted in the 1928 New Year Honours, appointed a Knight Commander of the Royal Victorian Order (KCVO) in the 1944 New Year Honours, promoted to Knight Grand Cross of the Order (GCVO) in the 1957 New Year Honours and appointed a Member of the Order of the Companions of Honour (CH) in the 1967 Birthday Honours.

He was elected a Fellow of the Royal Society in May 1926. His candidacy citation read:

Distinguished for his investigations in physical and mineralogical chemistry, including electrical conductivity, ionisation, and electrolytic equilibria in aqueous and non-aqueous solutions. Has greatly contributed by his own work and that of his pupils to the building up of a notable school of physico-chemical research at Oxford. During the war and afterwards has done valuable work in connection with gas services. Acted as Chemical Adviser to the Third Army in France. Appointed Assistant Director of Gas Services, GHQ. Later appointed Controller of Chemical Warfare Department, with the rank of Brigadier-General.

He gave the address "Man's Use of Energy" as president of the British Association for 1949–1950. He received the Hoover Medal in 1968.

== Family ==
Hartley was married in 1906 to Gertrude, eldest daughter of Arthur Lionel Smith, who was later Master of Balliol College. They had one son and one daughter.

== See also ==
- Balliol-Trinity Laboratories
- LMS Scientific Research Laboratory
