= Band Ohne Namen =

Band ohne Namen
- Also known as: Band Without Name; B.O.N; Die Allianz
- Origin: Berlin, Germany
- Genre: Pop
- Occupation: Singer / Songwriter
- Years active: 1999 – 2004
- Label: Sony BMG
- Members: Guy Gross; Claus Capek

Band ohne Namen (English translation Band Without Name, also known as B.O.N., previously known under the name Die Allianz) was a duo composed of Guy Gross and Claus Capek, both from Germany. They are most famous for their hip-pop record "Boys", which charted in many European countries in 2000. The song also peaked at number 79 in Australia 2001.

The original version of "Boys" as featured on their debut album, No. 1, consisted of lyrics formed by German verses interrupted by an English chorus. The single became a hit after it was translated fully into English, which spurred their next album, B.O.N. in the USA, which was an all-English version of No. 1.

The follow-up English single "Nobody" was not as successful, and did not enter the English charts, although it featured on the UK MTV Hits music channel. Their follow-up track in German, "Take My Heart", was certified gold in Germany.

Their third album See My Life, was the duo's last album before their split in 2003.

Guy Gross went on to release an EP in 2005 called Nothing to Lose a.k.a. Nichts zu Verlieren.

== Discography ==
- 2000 - No.1
- 2000 - B.O.N. in the USA
- 2002 - See My Life
