= Chazey-Bons =

Commune in Auvergne-Rhône-Alpes, France

- Commune
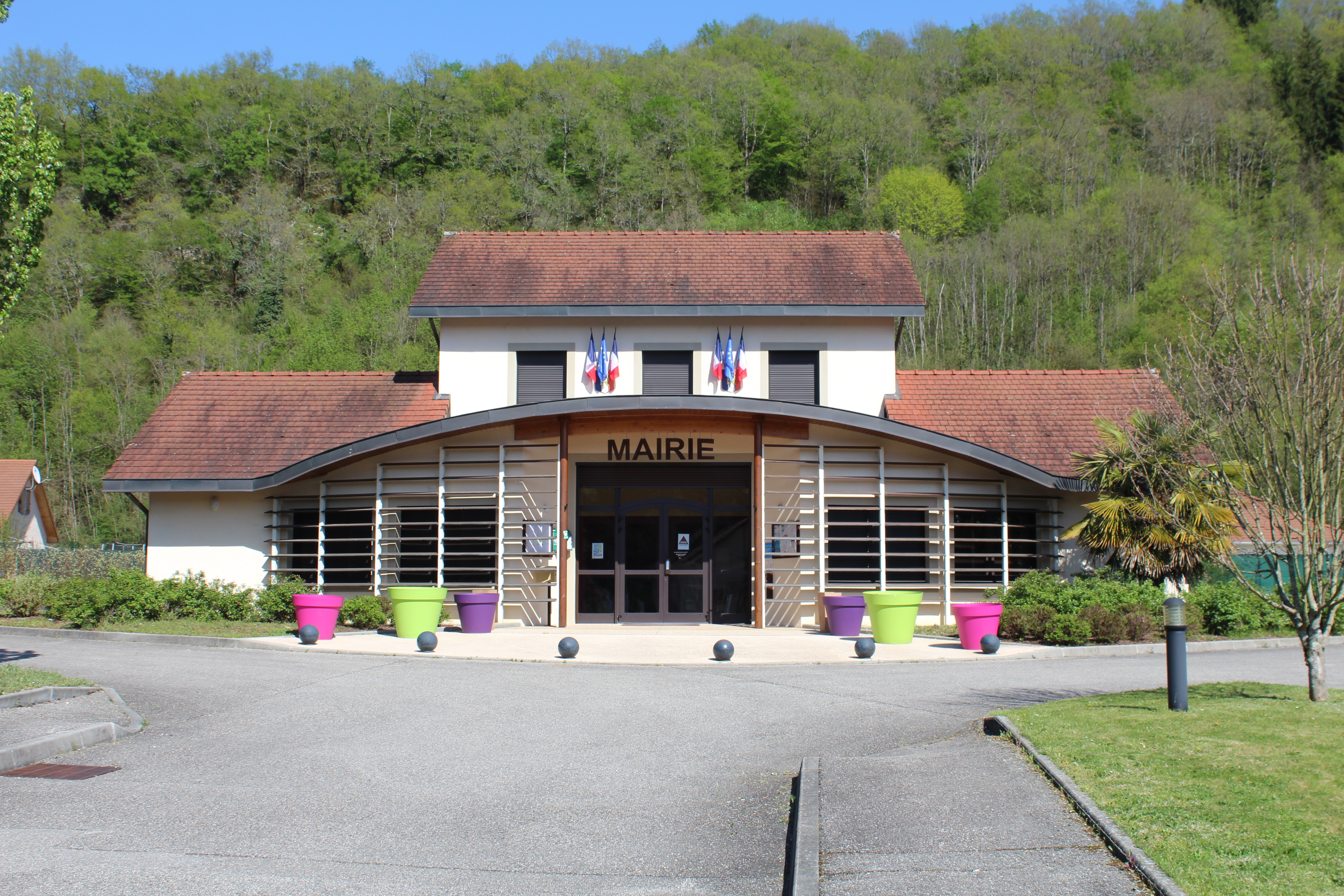
- Town hall
- Location of Chazey-Bons
- Location within France Location within Auvergne-Rhône-Alpes
- Coordinates: 45°48′00″N 5°41′00″E
- Country: France
- Region: Auvergne-Rhône-Alpes
- Department: Ain
- Arrondissement: Belley
- Canton: Belley
- Intercommunality: Bugey Sud

Government
  - Mayor (2026–32): Philip Lallement
- Area^{1}: 15.44 km^{2} (5.96 sq mi)
- Elevation: 228 m (748 ft)
- Highest elevation: 423 m (1,388 ft)
- Lowest elevation: 223 m (732 ft)
- Population (2023): 1,142
  - Density: 73.96/km^{2} (191.6/sq mi)
- Time zone: UTC+01:00 (CET)
  - Summer (DST): UTC+02:00 (CEST)
- INSEE/Postal code: 01098 /01300
- ^{1} French Land Register data, which excludes lakes, ponds, glaciers > 1 km^{2} (0.386 sq mi or 247 acres) and river estuaries.

Chazey-Bons (French pronunciation: [ʃazɛ bɔ̃]) is a commune in the Ain department in eastern France. On 1 January 2017, the former commune of Pugieu was merged into Chazey-Bons.

== See also ==
- Communes of the Ain department
