= Bon Accord Baths =

Disused swimming pool in Aberdeen, Scotland

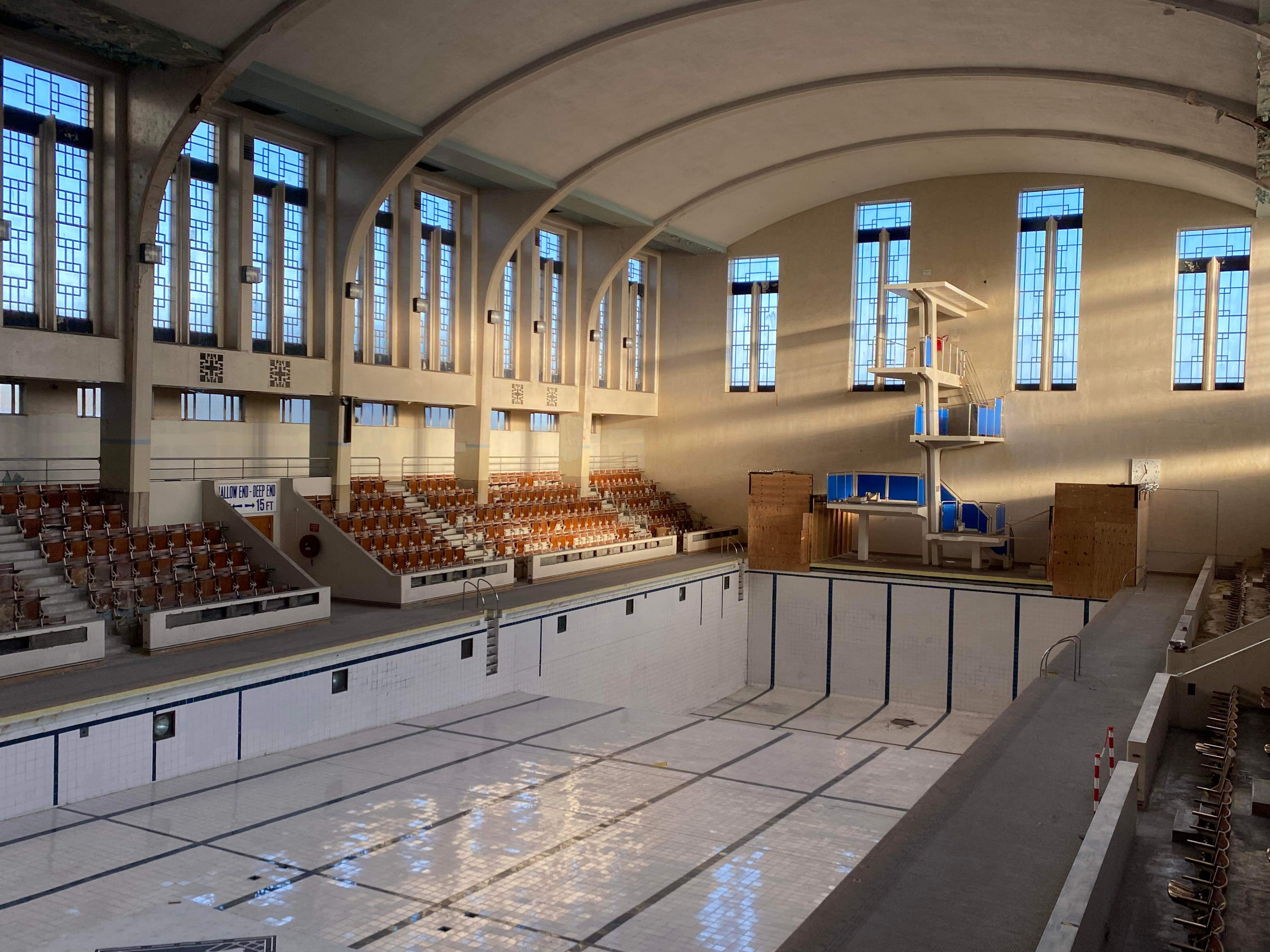
- Pictured in 2024
- Interactive map of Bon Accord Baths
- Former names: Uptown Baths
- Address: Justice Mill Lane, Aberdeen
- Coordinates: 57°8′30.62″N 2°6′39.12″W
- Owner: Aberdeen City Council

Construction
- Opened: 30 August 1940
- Closed: 31 March 2008
- Architect: Aberdeen City Architect's Department

Website
- bonaccordbaths.org.uk

Listed Building – Category B
- Official name: Bon Accord Baths
- Designated: 27 June 1991
- Reference no.: LB20677

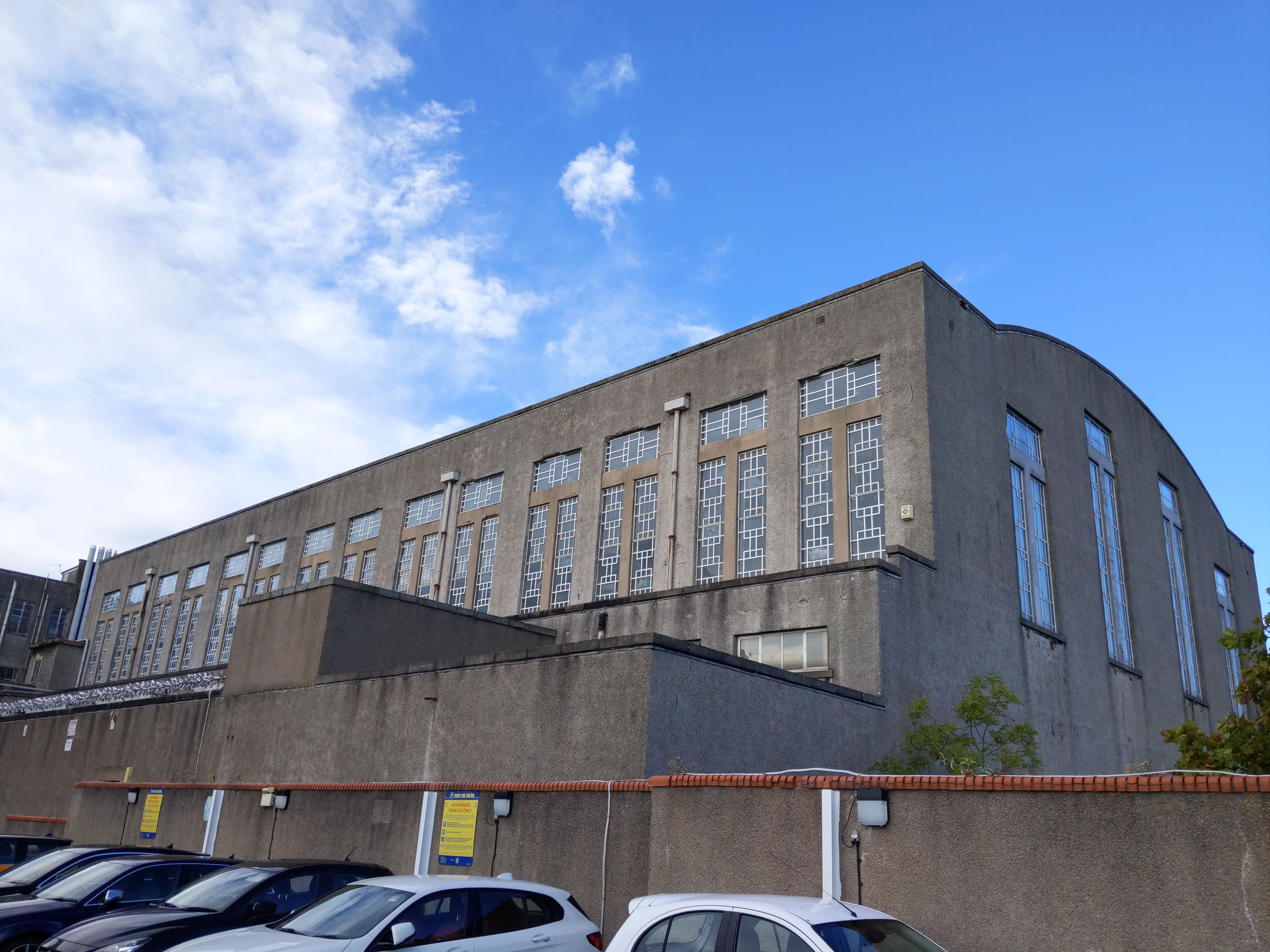
Outside of the Bon Accord Baths

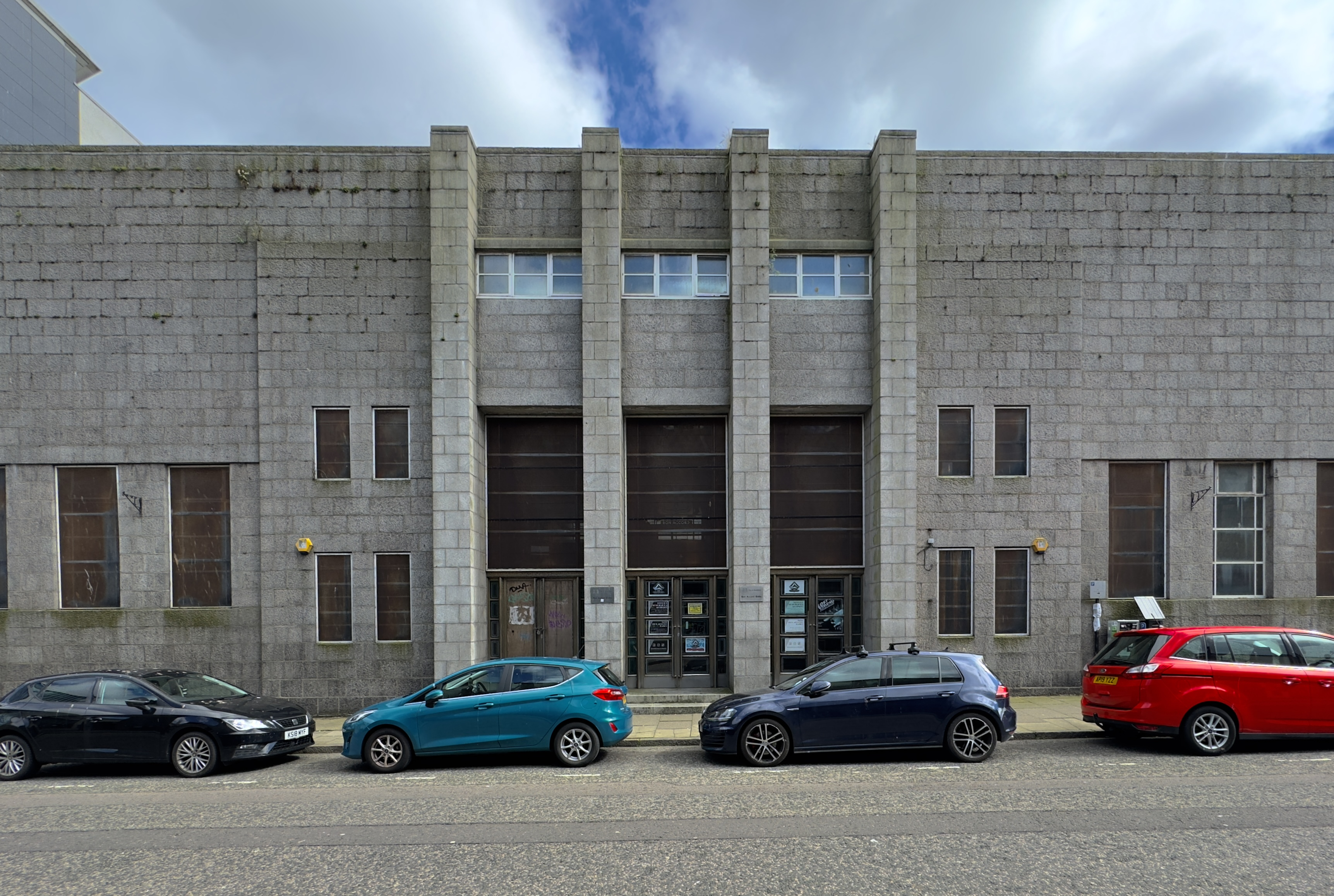
View from Justice Mill Lane

Bon Accord Baths, previously the Uptown Baths, is a category B listed Art Deco indoor swimming pool and baths complex in Aberdeen, Scotland. It is recognized as one of the most significant surviving indoor swimming pools of the interwar period in the UK. It is not currently operational, but is being managed by Bon Accord Heritage, a registered charity working to restore and reopen the facility under community ownership. It is currently listed on the Buildings at Risk Register for Scotland.

== History ==
The site on Justice Mill Lane was acquired by the City Council in 1934. Construction, to designs by the Aberdeen City Architect's Department, began on 22 October 1936, and the building was opened to the public on 30 August 1940. The opening of the Baths was recorded in a surviving news film.

The complex was renamed Bon Accord Baths in 1955.

The complex was closed between April and November 2006 for refurbishment. It was closed permanently by Aberdeen City Council on 31 March 2008 as part of wider budget cuts. The council stated that the operating costs were much higher than for similar facilities across the UK, and that the complex was surplus to its requirements. It was reported to have cost over £1 million per year to operate. In March 2010, the council announced that it was intending to sell the complex, noting that it had the potential for re-development while retaining the architectural features of the building.

In 2015, a closing date was set for offers on the baths. However, due to the public support attracted by the Save the Bon Accord Baths campaign, the complex was not sold. It is still owned by Aberdeen City Council, but Bon Accord Heritage have an agreement with the Council to develop plans for the restoration and reopening of the Baths under community ownership.

In 2022, Aberdeen City Council passed a motion to give official support to the project.

== Architecture ==
The complex, consisting of pool, private baths, and health suites, is housed within an Art Deco building, designed by the Aberdeen City Architect's Department and the City Engineers Department. Authorship has been ascribed to Alexander McRobbie, who was a young assistant in the Architect's Department and drafted the surviving plans. The inscription in the lobby credits A.B. Gardner, City Architect; Thomas F. Henderson, City Engineer; and James Hay, Convenor of the (Links and Parks) Committee. The architectural style is related to that of other notable buildings of the 1930s in Aberdeen, such as the Rosemount Square housing (also by the City Architect’s Department), Tullos Primary School, and the Northern Hotel; all these buildings are faced in Aberdeen granite, forming a locally specific variant of Scottish Art Deco.

The structural system is reinforced concrete and masonry. The street elevation and side elevation of the front block are faced in local granite ashlar, the other exterior walls are finished with harling (viz. rough-casting). The relative austerity of the exterior belies the drama and elegance of the interior. The stainless steel and glass entry doors open into the ticketing hall, faced with Hopton Wood Stone. The sycamore wood-paneled vestibule and corridor lead to a balcony, dramatically overlooking the 120 ft x 40 ft pool. Seating for approximately one thousand spectators is arranged to either side of the pool. A five-level 10m high reinforced concrete diving tower is situated at the 15ft deep end. Underwater lighting, a relative novelty at that time, was installed behind windows along the sides of the pool.

The architectural critic and editor Catherine Slessor wrote in 2019 that "While not exactly sybaritic, it did have an unforgettable sense of spatial and social drama … Underscored by a sense of municipal decorum and ambition, Alexander McRobbie's architecture steadfastly epitomises the famous maxim of Berthold Lubetkin: 'Nothing in too good for ordinary people'".

It was Category B listed in 1991.

== Reopening campaign ==
The community group Save Bon Accord Baths (later becoming Bon Accord Heritage SCIO) was established in 2014 with the aim of reopening the complex for swimming. In September 2020, the group held an Open Weekend, allowing the public entry to the building for the first time since its closure in 2008; more than 1,600 people visited the building over two days. Since then, open days have been held twice a year, including Doors Open Day in 2023 . Since 2022, the annual Aberdeen Jazz Festival has staged musical performances at the Baths under the title "Soundbath".

Extensive work has been undertaken by the volunteers and trustees to date, including the cleaning up of much of the building, remedial work to prevent further decline, removal of all vegetation from the roof, extensive boarding up of windows and securing of the building to prevent unauthorised access and vandalism.

In 2023, the project was selected by the public as one of five local charity partners to receive funding from The Press and Journal's P&J 275 Community Fund.

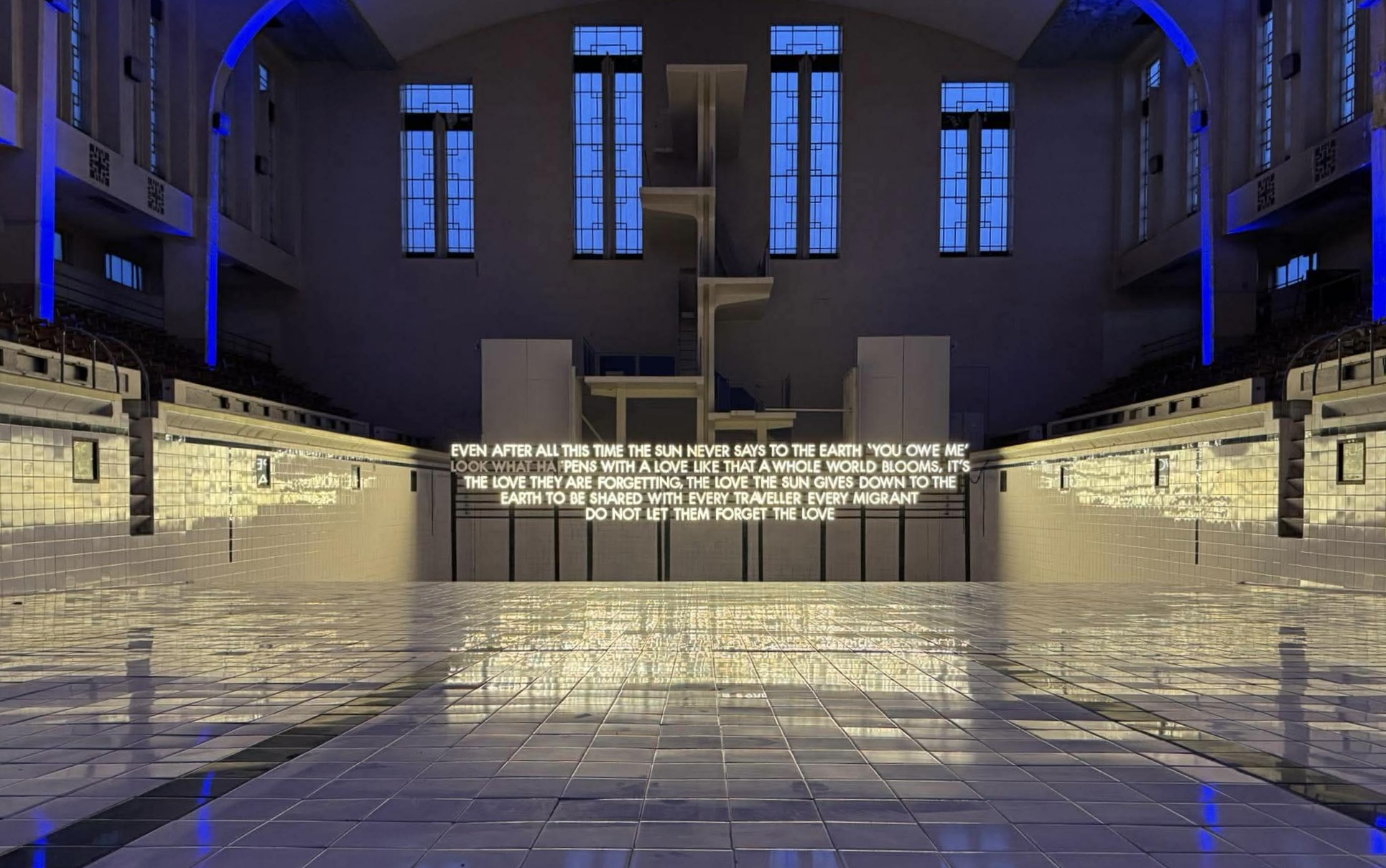
Robert Montgomery, Nuart 2026

In 2025, an advertisement for Bodyform period products, It's Never Just a Drop, featuring a giant inflatable drop of blood, was filmed at the Baths.

In April 2026, Nuart Aberdeen presented Robert Montgomery's eleven-meter illuminated text installation Even After All This Time the Sun Never Says to the Earth "You Owe Me" in the empty pool. A short film of Montgomery's installation was released by Nuart in August 2026.
