= Bon, Amur Oblast =

Bon Бон
- Village
- Location within Amur Oblast Location within Russia
- Coordinates: 49°22′N 130°05′E
- Country: Russia
- Region: Amur Oblast
- District: Arkharinsky District
- Time zone: UTC+9:00

Bon (Russian: Бон) is a rural locality (a selo) in Arkharinsky District, Amur Oblast, Russia. The population was 7 in 2018. There is 1 street.

== Geography ==
Bon is located near the right bank of the Arkhara River, 5 km south of Arkhara (the district's administrative centre) by road. Arkhara is the nearest rural locality.
