= John Hillric Bonn =

German-American railroad executive (1829–1891)

President of the North Hudson County Railway
- In office 1865–1891

Personal details
- Born: 1829 Friesland, Grand Duchy of Oldenburg
- Died: November 15, 1891 (aged 62) Weehawken, New Jersey
- Occupation: Railroad executive

John Hillric Bonn (1829 – November 15, 1891) was the first president of the North Hudson County Railway and remained so until his death in 1891, a period of twenty-six years. He also was one of the founders of the Eldorado Amusement Park in Weehawken, New Jersey.

== Biography ==
He was born in 1829 in Friesland, Grand Duchy of Oldenburg. He migrated to the United States in 1857 and married Angelique Bonjer.

He founded and became the first president of the North Hudson County Railway in 1865.

On October 18, 1891, it was announced that the Hoboken Land and Improvement Company was purchasing his holdings for $2,500,000 (approximately $89,583,000 today).

He died on November 15, 1891, in Weehawken, New Jersey of a cerebral aneurysm.
