= Gisela Bonn =

German journalist (1909–1996)

- Born: 22 September 1909; Germany
- Died: 11 October 1996 (aged 87)
- Occupation(s): Journalist; Environmental activist Indologist
- Awards: Padma Shri

Gisela Bonn (22 September 1909 – 11 October 1996) was a German journalist, writer, environmental activist and Indologist.

Noted for her contributions to the betterment of Indo-German relations, she was the author of many books, including several on India, such as The Indian Challenge, Indien und der Subkontinent and Nehru: Annaherungen an einen Staatsmann und Philosophen. The Government of India awarded her the fourth highest civilian award of Padma Shri in 1990.

The Indian Council for Cultural Relations (ICCR), an autonomous body under the Government of India, instituted an award, Gisela Bonn Award, in 1996, to honour her services to bolster Indo-German friendship.
