= Bons-en-Chablais =

Bons-en-Chablais Ban (Savoyard)
- Commune
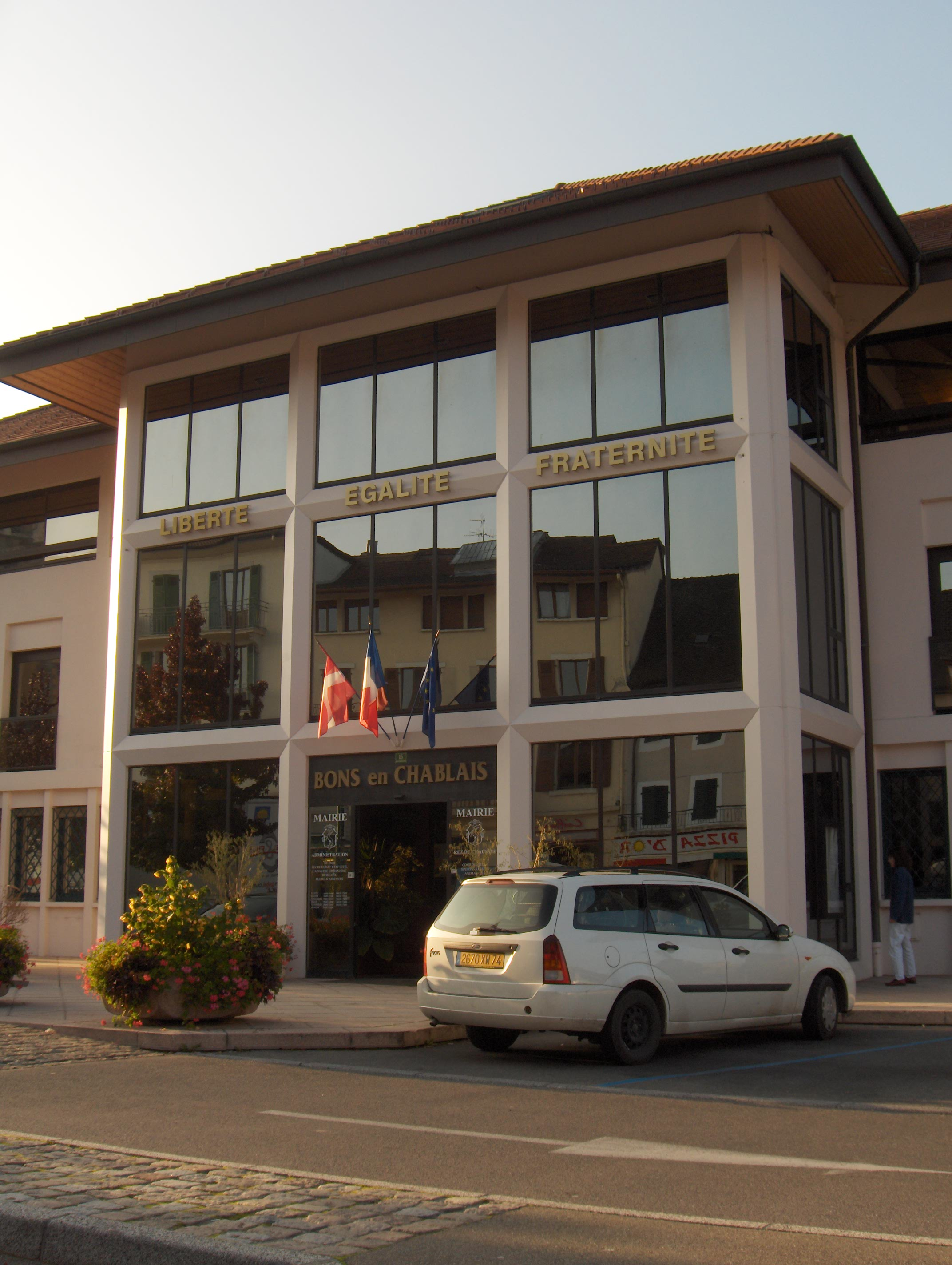
- The town hall in Bons-en-Chablais

- Coat of arms
- Location of Bons-en-Chablais
- Location within France Location within Auvergne-Rhône-Alpes
- Coordinates: 46°15′55″N 6°22′15″E
- Country: France
- Region: Auvergne-Rhône-Alpes
- Department: Haute-Savoie
- Arrondissement: Thonon-les-Bains
- Canton: Sciez
- Intercommunality: Thonon Agglomération

Government
  - Mayor (2020–2026): Olivier Jacquier
- Area^{1}: 19.09 km^{2} (7.37 sq mi)
- Highest elevation: 1,480 m (4,860 ft)
- Lowest elevation: 475 m (1,558 ft)
- Population (2023): 6,343
  - Density: 332.3/km^{2} (860.6/sq mi)
- Demonym: Bonsois / Bonsoises
- Time zone: UTC+01:00 (CET)
  - Summer (DST): UTC+02:00 (CEST)
- INSEE/Postal code: 74043 /74890
- ^{1} French Land Register data, which excludes lakes, ponds, glaciers > 1 km^{2} (0.386 sq mi or 247 acres) and river estuaries.

Bons-en-Chablais (Savoyard: Ban) is a commune in the Haute-Savoie department and Auvergne-Rhône-Alpes region of eastern France.

== Population ==
Historical population
Year	Pop.	±% p.a.
1968	1,920	—
1975	2,431	+3.43%
1982	2,781	+1.94%
1990	3,275	+2.06%
1999	3,980	+2.19%
2007	4,609	+1.85%
2012	5,091	+2.01%
2017	5,631	+2.04%
2023	6,343	+2.00%
Source: INSEE

== See also ==
- Communes of the Haute-Savoie department
