= The Kiralfy Brothers =

Burlesque and spectacle producers

Imre Kiralfy
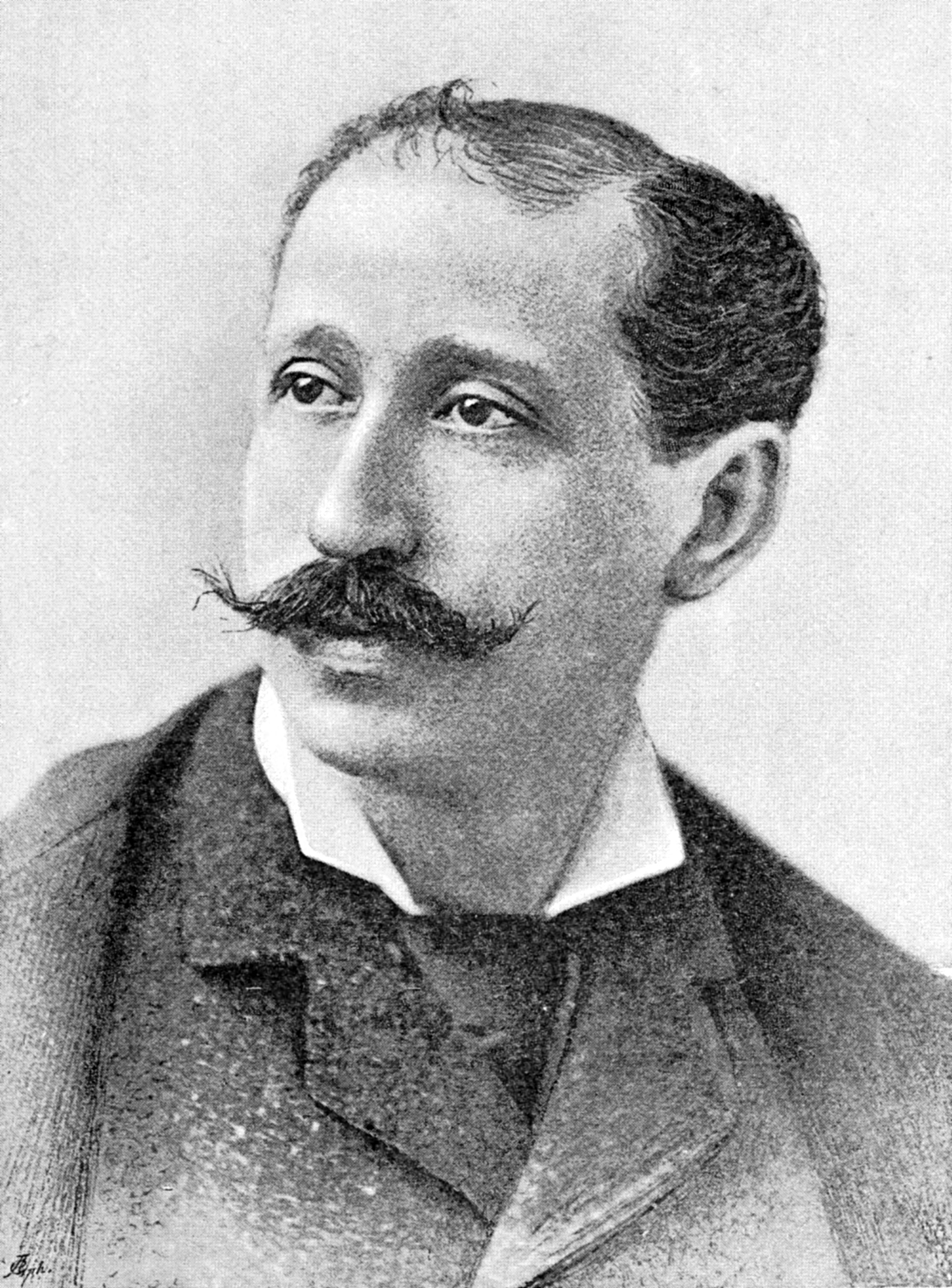
- Imre Kiralfy in 1891
- Born: Imre Königsbaum; January 1, 1845; Pest, Hungary, the Austrian Empire
- Died: April 27, 1919 (aged 74); Brighton, England
- Occupations: Dancer, producer
- Years active: 1849–1908
- Spouse: Marie Graham (1851–1942)
- Children: Edgar Kiralfy

Bolossy Kiralfy
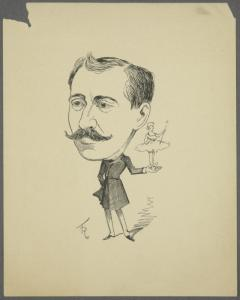
- Caricature of Bolossy Kiralfy
- Born: Balázs Königsbaum; January , 1848; Pest, Hungary, the Austrian Empire
- Died: 1932 (aged 83–84); New York City, United States
- Occupations: Dancer, director, producer

Imre Kiralfy and Bolossy Kiralfy were highly influential burlesque and spectacle producers in Europe and the United States toward the end of the 19th century.

== Family life ==
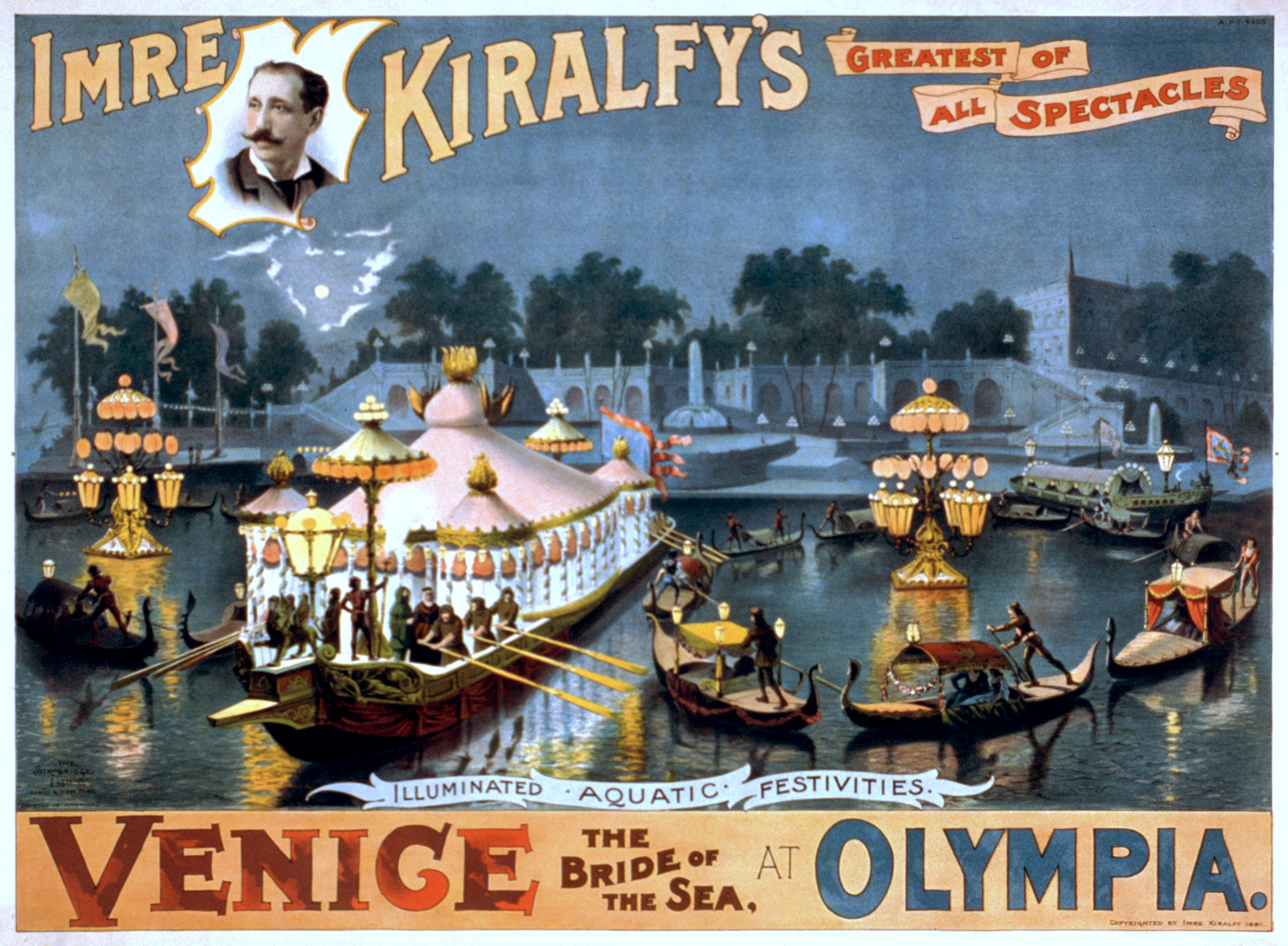
Imre Kiralfy's greatest of all spectacles, Venice, The Bride of the Sea at the Olympia, London, featured lluminated aquatic festivities.

The Kiralfy Brothers, Imre (1845–1919) and Bolossy (1848–1932), were the eldest of seven siblings born in the 1840s in Pest—(since 1873 incorporated with Buda and Óbuda into Budapest)—during the Hungarian Revolution, in which their father, Jacob Königsbaum, was ruined. When they were young children, Imre and Bolossy began to teach themselves to dance. They continued for years until their father caught them and promptly enrolled them in dance classes. Soon, they were dancing at large venues such as the Hungarian Circus. There the brothers first performed under the name "Kiralfy" instead of their family name of Königsbaum; the boys' father changed their name to prevent them from being recognized as the sons of a revolutionary. They were never recognized, though over the years, there were a number of close encounters with Austrian police, during many of which their father was nearly arrested. Jacob Königsbaum and their mother, Anna (Rosa) Weisberger, were highly supportive of their sons' career. They gave up their clothing business to take the brothers on tour through Europe. For many years, the family continued to travel, touring all through both Eastern and Western Europe, while the three of the four younger siblings went to school and learned dance. The Kiralfy family motto was "All the World's a Stage." Eventually, their sisters Haniola, Emile and Katie, as well as their youngest brother Arnold joined Imre and Bolossy in the dance industry. Only their brother Ronald was uninterested in dance.

== Early career and education ==
As teenagers in the 1860s, Bolossy and Imre travelled to Paris, where they were immediately taken with theatrical spectacle. Bolossy believes he first developed his theory of theatre in the city:

Real musical theatre had to be popular theatre, attracting an audience from all segments of society. It had to embody in logical form all aspects of the theatre – music, lyrics, dance and drama – in a production that was usually greater than the sum of its parts. It had to have a meaningful story with a universal theme, and it had to have a hero or heroine with whom the audience could sympathize.

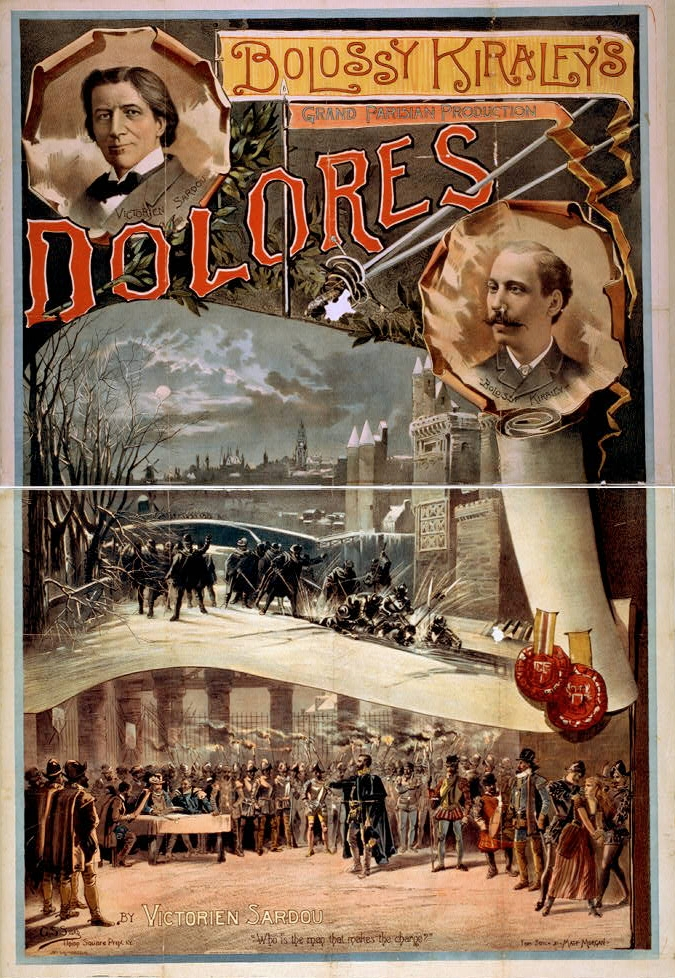
Bolossy Kiralfy's grand Parisian production, Dolores by Victorien Sardou

Imre and Bolossy both trained at the Opera Ballet but they refused to become permanent performers. Bolossy reflects on his training in Paris:

There is no question that in Paris I acquired my training, not only in the finest Ballet technique from Monsieur Barres, but in the areas of production and management. The presentations at the Theatre Francais taught me dramatic staging. My experience at the Theatre de la Porte-Saint-Martin and at the Chatelet gave me the ability to produce big spectacular numbers. At the Opera I learned the choreography that would help me to plan my lavish musical productions. And it was there that my encounters with the artists proved how exciting and challenging the work of producers and directors could be.

Bolossy Kiralfy was 26 when he retired as a performer and began the second phase of his career where he focused on producing and choreographing. He adapted European productions to the United States. The Kiralfy Brothers had a 13-year-long producing partnership. According to Bolossy Kiralfy, “The American public not only became educated of our large dance extravaganzas, they demanded them in all musical productions.”

When they travelled to New York City in May 1869, the Kiralfy Brothers may already have envisioned how to produce their ideas of spectacle on stage. For four years, the family continued to tour as dancers, until eventually being contracted by Niblo's Garden, just after the theatre’s immense success with The Black Crook. Their first foray into the production side of theatre came in 1871, with George L. Fox's pantomime Humpty Dumpty at the Olympic, in which the “Kiralfy Troupe,” as they had come to be known, were performing. The reviewers of the production praised both the dancing and the scenery greatly, declaring the latter to be “of exceptional beauty”. This “exceptional beauty” would become a common theme in reviews of the Kiralfy Brothers' productions.

The Black Crook

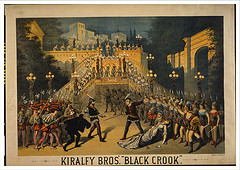
The Black Crook

In August 1873, the brothers first produced their own musical spectacle, a revival of The Black Crook at Niblo's Garden. They added musical numbers, improved the costumes (beyond exposing the legs of the actresses), and strengthened the dance numbers. According to Bolossy Kiralfy, their revival was an immense success, playing over one hundred performances before going on tour and breaking Niblo's Garden's record number of performances of a revival. Their production, featuring actors such as George Atkins, E.K. Collier, and W. Martin, as well as the Kiralfy sisters’ dancing talents, was later revived from November 1874 to January 1875. With this production, the brothers achieved their goal of making popular theatre, and they made a strong effort to elevate The Black Crook into a slightly higher class of theatre.

The Deluge, or Paradise Lost

The next year, they imported the French spectacle The Deluge to Niblo's Garden, and were noted for producing rain on stage. The Deluge, otherwise known as Paradise Lost, opened Niblo's Garden's 1874–1875 season, on September 4, 1874. This production was called a “delectability” by the historian George Odell. Its players included actresses Julia Seamen, Lillie McDonald and Katie New, as well as the Kiralfy Sisters as dancers. The Deluge ran until November 14, 1874, and a competing theater company, Bryant's Minstrels, opened their own The Deluge on the same day. Odell said it brought “a veritable flood-tide of success”. When one of the many revivals of the Kiralfy Brothers’ production was brought to the Walnut Street Theatre in Philadelphia in April 1879, reviewers praised the ballet and scenery, while essentially ignoring the acting. One reviewer comments that the sets of “Pandemonium, the Garden of Eden, and the Temple of Enoch were wonderful to behold, and were master-pieces of scenic painting,” and goes on to note that, because the piece was under the direction of the Kiralfys, it would “undoubtedly draw full houses”. The Deluge is a perfect example of the Kiralfys’ mastery of the key concepts of burlesque; the plot was weak but the gorgeous set, astonishing special effects, and beautiful girls served well to cover this up.

Around the World in Eighty Days

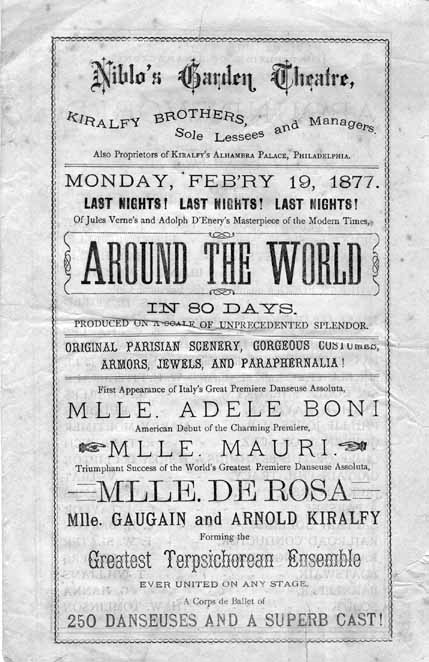
The Kiralfy Brothers' amazing adaptation of Jules Verne's Around the World in 80 Days (1877)

On August 28, 1875, the Kiralfy Brothers put up, “in spectacular style,” Around the World in Eighty Days at the New York Academy of Music. According to Bolossy Kiralfy, their goal with the production was to “convert American theatre audiences into enthusiasts for the French style of musical spectacle” which so inspired the brothers. Around the World in Eighty Days based on the Jules Verne novel and adapted for the stage by Michael d’Ennery, was another Parisian import. To mount the show in the United States, the brothers re-created the scenery and costumes from the Paris production as precisely as possible, and hired all the cast and crew members, except for the principal speaking roles, from the Théâtre de la Porte Saint-Martin, where the original production was performed. In terms of special effects, the brothers rented an elephant for $150 per week, brought a steam engine from Europe to run automation, and created a new stage deck for the Academy of Music to accommodate for a sinking steam ship. Audiences loved the depictions of foreign attractions such as the Suez Canal, Calcutta, and the Taj Mahal. The Kiralfys were immediately praised for their use of pastel backgrounds which please the eye but do not distract from performance. They were also some of the first American producers to utilize realistic set design. For example, their trees looked like actual trees and not theatrical renditions of trees. They convinced Jules Verne to add a bit about a hot air balloon to the already-extensive adventures of Phileas Fogg and his companions so that the Kiralfys could put a real helium balloon onstage to be operated by wires. Aside from adding special effects, few changes were made to the Paris production. They added the Around the World Waltz and a curtain for scene changes that was in the shape of a fan. The Kiralfy production was larger than the Paris production, having a cast of 35 principal actors, a ballet corps, and over 200 ensemble members.

Around the World in Eighty Days opened at the Academy of Music, after a legal challenge due to another New York troupe trying to mount the same Paris production, and it was a major hit. The special effects and exciting story attracted large audiences consistently. It became so popular that the President of the United States attended a performance. President Ulysses S. Grant, who attended a performance on September 17, 1875, with Secretary George M. Robeson, General Orville E. Babcock, and former-Attorney General George Henry Williams, “seemed to be much pleased with the brilliant spectacle”. After the production closed in October at the Academy of Music, it went on tour to the outer boroughs for two weeks, until it reached the Brooklyn Academy of Music, during Christmas week in 1875. Yet, like The Deluge, this Kiralfy Brothers production did not end here.

The first of a long line of expansive revivals of Around the World in Eighty Days opened again at Niblo's Garden on January 22, 1877. It was presented at Niblo's Garden nine times, together with a series of very successful tours and revivals between 1881 and 1892 throughout New York City and the United States. Some of the houses for Around the World included Haverly’s Theatre in Brooklyn, the Novelty Theatre in Brooklyn, and the Grand Opera House, the Windsor Theatre, and the Amphion Academy. For the audience and the producers, much of the appeal in such frequent productions lay in the fluidity of the plot, which allowed many opportunities for additions to the story, scenery and dance. The fantastic situations Phileas Fogg and company get into on their trip around the world, allow for inserts and interpretation. Due to their success with this work, the brothers bought a property at 39 Washington Square, which they used for offices and residence until 1921.

Excelsior

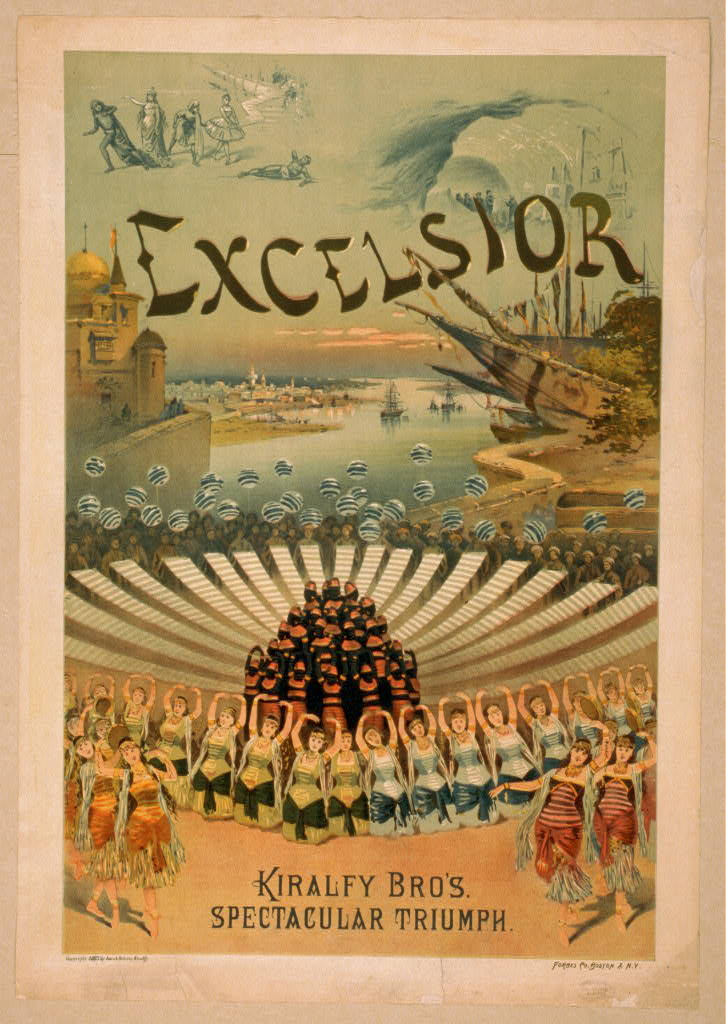
Excelsior (1883), a Kiralfy Brothers spectacle

When the electric lightbulb was commercialized around 1880, the Kiralfy brothers took full advantage. They quickly put a production of Excelsior into the works with plans to be lit electrically for special effects scenes. The spectacle was presented at Niblo's Garden in 1883. There was still use of gas-lighting and they were not the first ones to employ electric lighting (they, themselves, had previously used electric light in their revival of The Black Crook) but they were the first and only production to be lit under the personal direction of Thomas Edison. In their production, the invention of incandescent light was celebrated along with the invention of the telegraph as incorporated in a dance of telegraph messengers. Not a word was spoken in the production and Excelsior is widely regarded as the Kiralfys’ most important work which showcased the Kiralfys’ expertise in dance and spectacle.

== Fallout and separate careers ==
The Kiralfy Brothers had a 13-year long producing partnership. In 1887, Imre and Bolossy Kiralfy had a falling out and the firm disbanded, driving Bolossy and Imre to produce outdoor spectacles. Neither publicly addressed the split, although, Bolossy intimated that his brother was making business deals behind his back. Upon their split, Bolossy continued to work in fantasy and fable whereas Imre pressed on with progressive era productions filled with science, technology, and machinery.

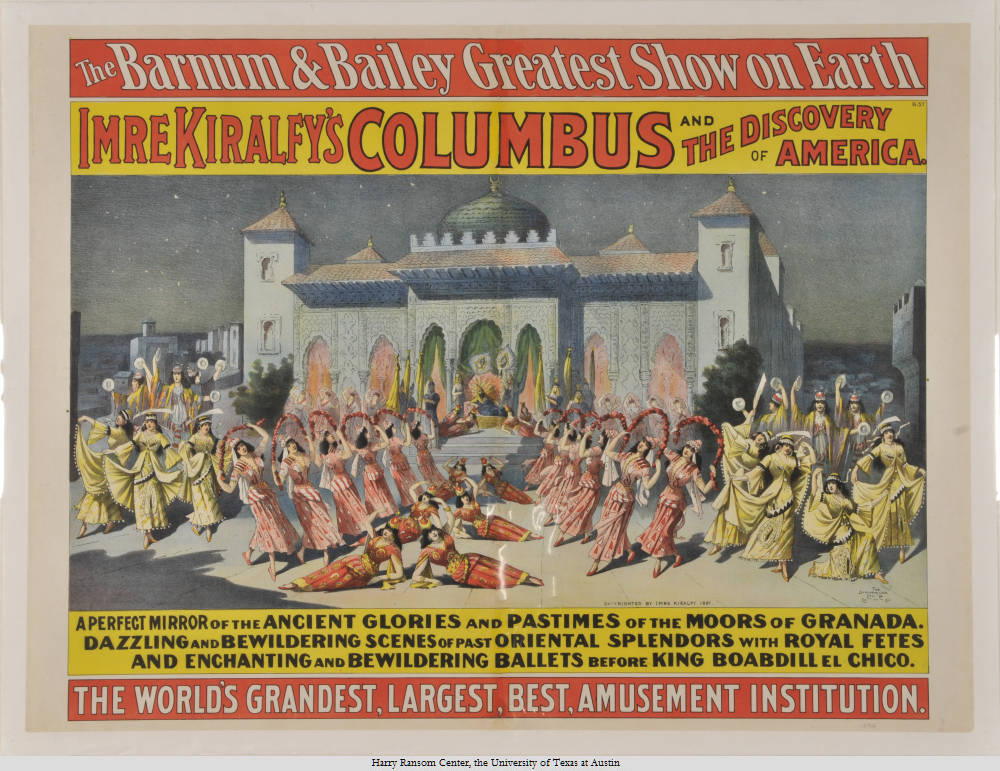
The Barnum and Bailey Greatest Show on Earth: Imre Kiralfy's Columbus and the Discovery of America (1892)

Imre Kiralfy after the split

Aerial view of Empress Hall

Imre Kiralfy’s The Fall of Rome was produced on Staten Island with 2,000 performers, a grand number at the time. In 1892, to mark the 400th anniversary of Columbus' "founding" of America, he produced Columbus and the Discovery of America at the Madison Square Garden Theatre. It was later featured at the Auditorium Theatre at the Chicago World’s Columbian Exposition. Imre Kiralfy also premiered his show America at the Chicago World’s Fair which was picked up by the Metropolitan Opera House in 1893. Life magazine in quoted as response to the production “Kiralfy out-Kiralfy’s himself” Imre Kiralfy then moved to England where he created even larger spectacles. The twenty-four acre Earl's Court Exhibition Centre grounds were rebuilt in 1894 by Imre Kiralfy in a Mughal Indian style. The Empire of India Exhibition opened the site in 1895, and was the first of a series of annual exhibitions there, which drew heavily on the abundance of transport links in the area to attract a mass audience. Highlights of the site included the two-storey Empress Hall, built for Kiralfy in Fulham which could seat 6,000 viewers for his spectaculars, and the 300-feet high Great Wheel whose forty carriages could each accommodate thirty people. Imre Kiralfy became a British citizen in 1901. The renowned producer died on April 27, 1919, at age 74 in Brighton, England. He is buried in the family mausoleum in Green-Wood Cemetery, New York, but there is also family mausoleum at Kensal Green Cemetery in London.

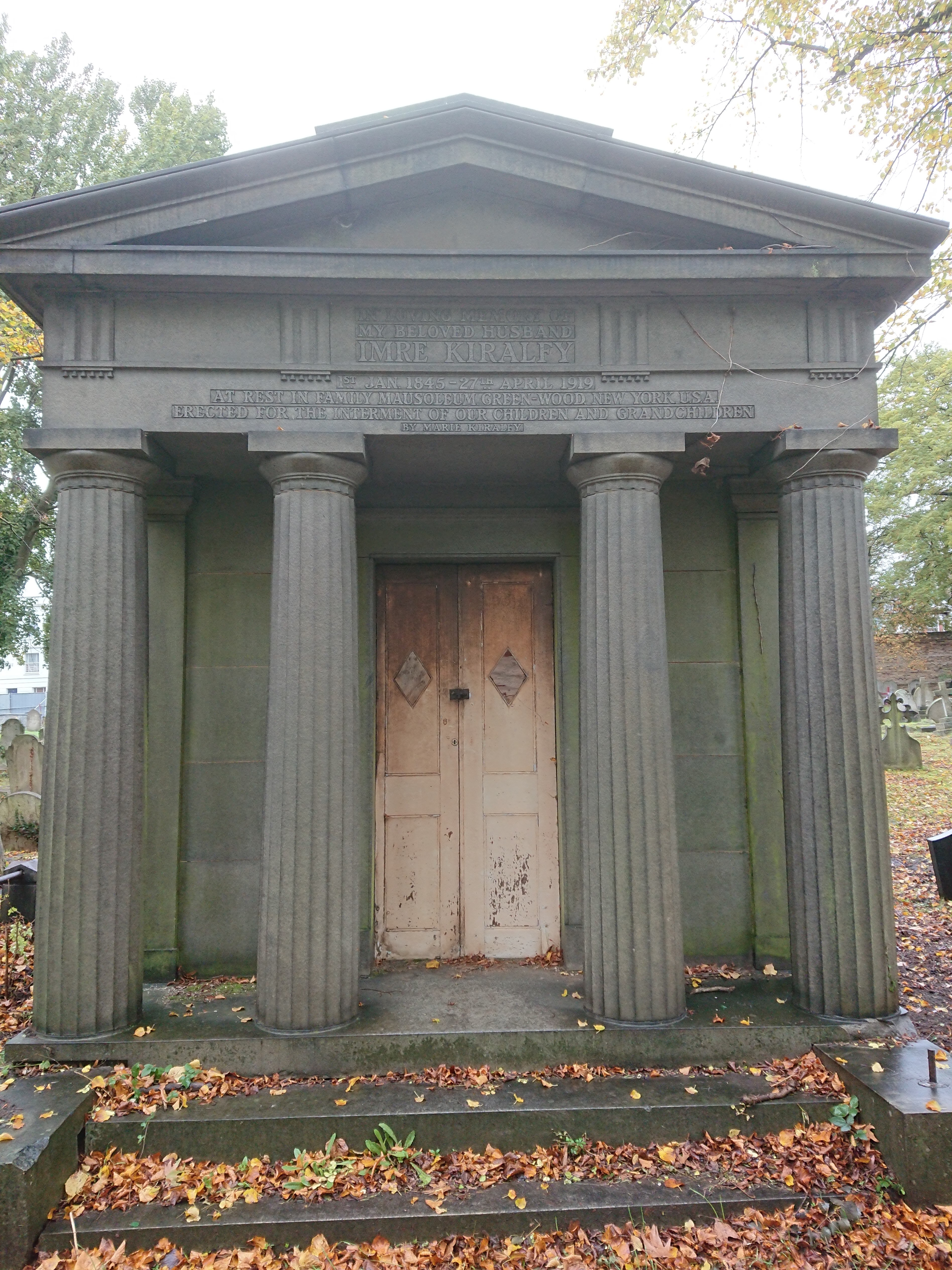
The Imre Kiralfy mausoleum at Kensal Green Cemetery

Bolossy Kiralfy after the split

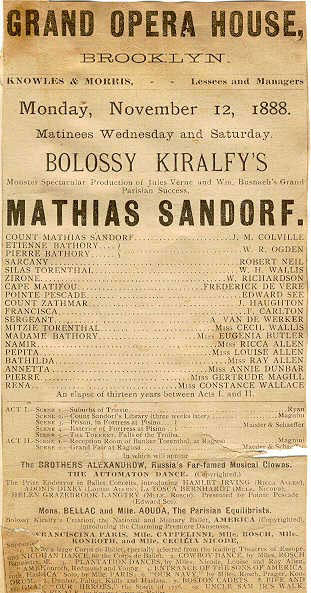
Bolossy Kiralfy's spectacular production of Jules Verne's Mathias Sandorf (1888)

During his time alone, Blossy Kiralfy focused a lot on outdoor theatre. In London he created Venice in London, which included a lake and water canals. A few years later, in Portland, Oregon, he produced Carnival in Venice. According to Bolossy, this production in Portland required “a huge open air theatre with a particularly broad canal connected to a lake. The four hundred foot stage was the largest ever constructed in the Northwest and allowed me to put two hundred performers in action in one scene. I could still hide myself and cruise the show in a gondola to evaluate the performance.” In 1888, Bolossy returned from his trip to Europe and brought two new spectacles to America, Mathias Sandorf and Antiope. Mathias Sandorf is a play by Jules Verne. Bolossy purchased the play itself along with the scenery, costumes and effects used in the original production. Kiralfy had several interviews with Jules Verne and William Busnach to improve certain scenes and adapt them for American audiences. Kiralfy also introduced two new ballets in this production; one of them is called America and required 120 performers; the other one is called The Fete of Storks and required no less than 200 performers. In this production, Kiralfy included performers like the James troupe of eccentric games, and Alexandrov Brothers, the famous Russian musical clowns.

The other production that Kiralfy brought was the new ballet Antiope which opened at London first. Kiralfy promised this ballet to be more brilliant and effective than the Excelsior, which was claimed to be best ballet of the time. The production featured 350 magnificent costumes designed by Wilhelm}. Kiralfy introduced some novel features in this production, one of which was an eccentric boat moving about on real water. Bolossy Kiralfy died in 1932 at the age of 84 in New York City.
