= Gipsy Kings discography =

- Studio albums: 13
- Live albums: 1
- Compilation albums: 15
- Singles: 28
- Video albums: 6
- Music videos: 16
- Cast recording albums: 1

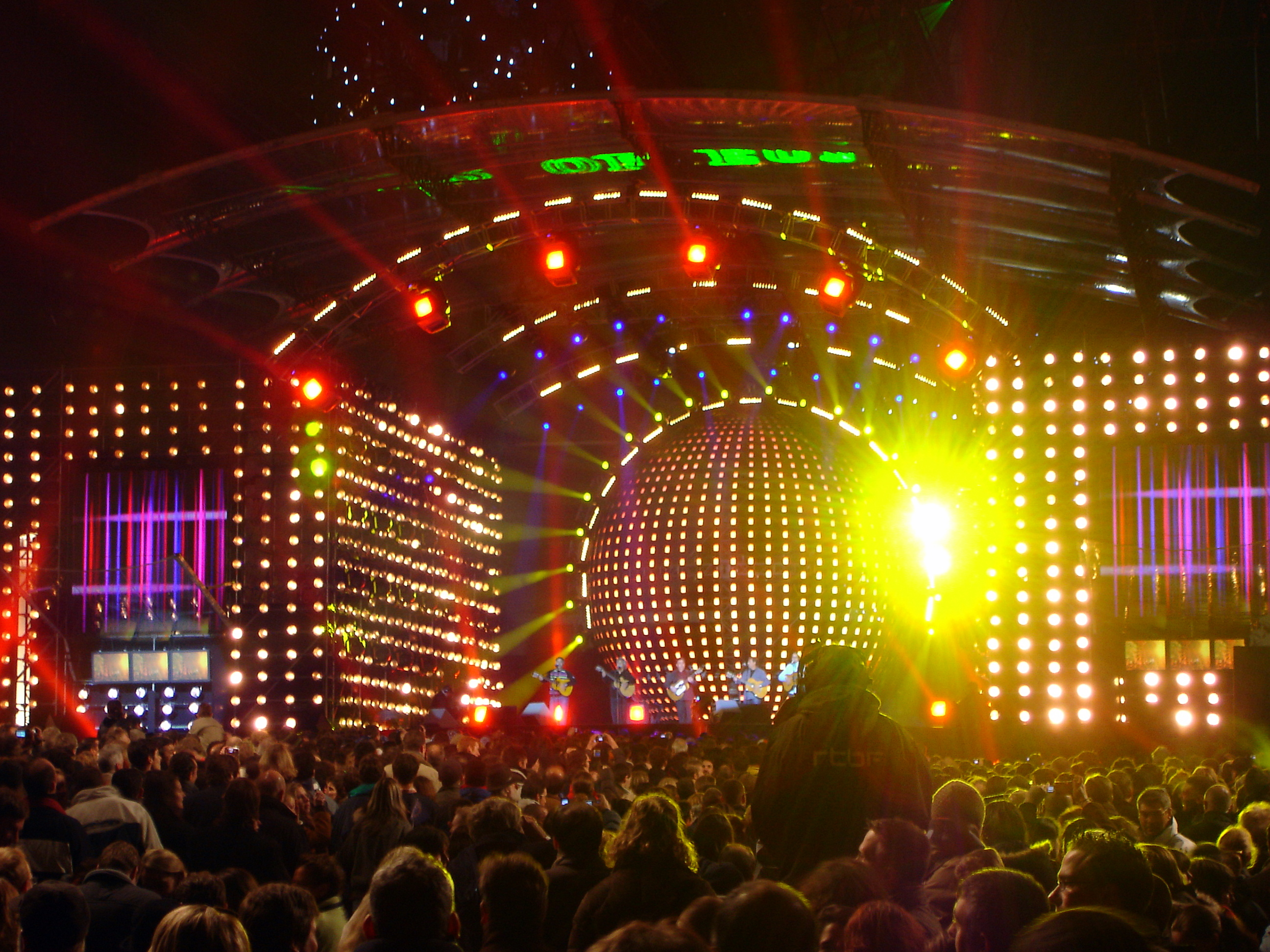
The Gipsy Kings

This article is the discography of French rumba flamenca band Gipsy Kings.

== Albums ==
=== Studio albums ===
Title	Album details	Peak chart positions										Certifications
Title	Album details	FRA	AUT	CAN	GER	NL	SWI	UK	US	US Latin	US World	Certifications
Allegria	Released: 6 August 1982; Label: Philips; Formats: LP	17	—	—	—	—	—	—	—	—	—	
Luna de Fuego	Released: 22 April 1983; Label: Philips; Formats: LP	—	—	—	—	—	—	—	—	—	—	
Gipsy Kings	Released: 21 August 1987; Label: P.E.M., Elektra; Formats: CD, LP, MC	3	20	38	58	22	10	16	57	3	6	AUS: 2× Platinum; CAN: 2× Platinum; SWI: Gold; UK: Gold; US: Platinum
Mosaïque	Released: 28 April 1989; Label: P.E.M., Elektra; Formats: CD, LP, MC; European and North American track list varies	14	—	65	19	53	21	27	95	11	1	GER: Gold; SWI: Gold; UK: Gold; US: Gold
Este Mundo	Released: 19 July 1991; Label: Columbia, Elektra; Formats: CD, LP, MC	13	4	24	3	1	1	19	120	13	2	AUT: Platinum; GER: Platinum; NL: Gold; SWI: Platinum; UK: Silver
Love and Liberté	Released: 8 November 1993; Label: Columbia, Elektra; Formats: CD, LP, MC; European and North American track list varies	—	20	73	81	—	40	—	—	2	1	
Estrellas	Released: October 1995; Label: Columbia, Nonesuch; Formats: CD, LP, MC; Released in the US in 1996 as Tierra Gitana	—	25	40	—	—	30	—	143	2	1	
Compas	Released: July 1997; Label: Columbia, Nonesuch; Formats: CD, MC	—	42	79	—	46	46	—	97	2	1	
Somos Gitanos	Release date: 24 September 2001; Label: Columbia, Nonesuch; Formats: CD, MC	—	—	—	—	—	100	—	—	3	1	
Roots	Release date: 14 March 2004; Label: Columbia, Nonesuch; Formats: CD, MC, digital download	—	—	—	—	42	—	—	166	3	1	
Pasajero	Release date: 2 October 2006; Label: Sony BMG, Nonesuch; Formats: CD, digital download	74	—	—	—	—	89	—	—	12	4	
Savor Flamenco	Release date: 10 September 2013; Label: Knitting Factory; Formats: CD, digital download	232	—	—	—	—	—	—	—	—	1	
Evidence	Release date: 2018; Label: Manos Music; Formats: digital download; Only released to attendees of Gipsy Kings' 2018 tour	—	—	—	—	—	—	—	—	—	—	
"—" denotes releases that did not chart or were not released in that territory.

=== Live albums ===
Title	Album details	Peak chart positions				
Title	Album details	FRA	GER	NL	US Latin	US World
Live	Released: September 1992; Label: Columbia, Elektra; Formats: CD, LP, MC	17	62	64	7	4

=== Cast recording albums ===
Title	Album details
Zorro	Released: 10 November 2008; Label: First Night; Formats: CD, digital download; Original cast recording from the musical of the same name

=== Compilations albums ===
Title	Album details	Peak chart positions										Certifications
Title	Album details	FRA	BEL (FL)	BEL (WA)	GER	NL	SWI	UK	US	US Latin	US World	Certifications
Baila Flamenco	Released: 1987; Label: Sara Music; Formats: LP; France-only release	—	—	—	—	—	—	—	—	—	—	
Djobi, Djoba	Released: 21 December 1988; Label: Philips; Formats: CD; Japan-only release	—	—	—	—	—	—	—	—	—	—	
Allegria	Released: 13 November 1990; Label: Elektra; Formats: CD, MC; US-only release comprising tracks from the band's first two albums	—	—	—	—	—	—	—	—	25	3	
Greatest Hits	Released: July 1994; Label: Columbia; Formats: CD, 2×LP, MC	17	47	32	6	6	3	11	—	—	—	AUT: Gold; CAN: 2× Platinum; GER: Gold; NL: Gold; SWI: Platinum; UK: Gold
The Best of the Gipsy Kings	Released: 28 March 1995; Label: Nonesuch; Formats: CD, MC; US-only release	—	—	—	—	—	—	—	105	2	1	US: Platinum
Love Songs	Released: July 1996; Label: Columbia, Nonesuch; Formats: CD, MC; Released in the US as Cantos de Amor	—	—	—	77	83	23	—	—	2	3	
Gold	Released: 1998; Label: Versailles; Formats: CD; France-only release	—	—	—	—	—	—	—	—	—	—	
¡Volaré! The Very Best of the Gipsy Kings	Released: 12 July 1999; Label: Columbia, P.E.M., Nonesuch; Formats: 2×CD, 2×MC	22 (Note: Peak position on the Compilations Chart.)	16	23	20	15	29	20	—	3	3	CAN: Gold; UK: Silver
Rare & Unplugged	Released: 27 June 2003; Label: Newsound 2000; Formats: CD; UK-only release	—	—	—	—	—	—	—	—	—	—	
The Very Best Of	Release date: 1 August 2005; Label: Sine, Sony Music; Formats: CD, MC	—	22	12	—	—	—	32	—	—	—	
Back to Back	Release date: 24 June 2011; Label: ARS Entertainment, Universal Music; Formats: 2×CD; Split album with Belle Perez; Belgium-only release	—	7	—	—	—	—	—	—	—	—	
Best Of	Release date: 22 July 2011; Label: Sony Music; Formats: 2×CD	17	—	41	—	—	—	—	—	—	—	
The Essential Gipsy Kings	Release date: 24 August 2012; Label: Columbia, Sony Music; Formats: CD, digital download	—	—	—	—	—	—	—	—	—	—	
Original Album Classics	Release date: 1 April 2013; Label: Columbia, Sony Music, Legacy; Formats: 5×CD	—	—	—	—	—	—	—	—	—	—	
The Real... Gipsy Kings – The Ultimate Collection	Released: 8 September 2014; Label: Columbia, Sony Music; Formats: 3×CD	—	—	—	—	—	—	—	—	—	—	
"—" denotes releases that did not chart or were not released in that territory.

== Singles ==
Single	Year	Peak chart positions										Album
Single	Year	FRA	AUS	BEL (FL)	GER	ITA	NL	SPA	SWI	UK	US Latin	Album
"Djobi, Djoba"	1982	—	—	—	—	—	—	—	—	—	—	Allegria
"Djobi, Djoba" (reissue / re-recording) (Note: The original 1983 release was re-issued in France in 1987. Everywhere else, the re-recorded version from Gipsy Kings was issued as a single.)	1987	15	131	—	—	—	34	—	—	—	—	Gipsy Kings
"Bamboléo"	1987	7	19	23	18	3	5	15	—	87	6	Gipsy Kings
"Djobi, Djoba" / "Bamboléo" (double A-side)	1987	3	—	—	—	—	—	—	—	—	—	Gipsy Kings
"Bem bem Maria"	1988	—	71	—	—	—	—	—	—	—	—	Gipsy Kings
"A mi manera (My Way)"	1989	—	—	—	—	—	—	—	—	—	—	Gipsy Kings
"Vamos a bailar"	1989	—	—	—	—	—	—	—	—	—	3	Mosaïque
"Soy"	1989	20	—	43	—	—	—	—	25	—	—	Mosaïque
"Volare"	1989	16	90	24	—	24	26	—	—	86	1	Mosaïque
"Caminando por la calle"	1990	—	—	—	—	—	—	—	—	—	—	Mosaïque
"Hotel California"	1991	—	—	—	—	—	—	7	—	—	—	Rubáiyát
"Baila me"	1991	36	—	7	16	—	5	13	27	92	9	Este Mundo
"Sin ella"	1991	—	—	—	80	—	—	—	—	—	12	Este Mundo
"Pida me la"	1992	28	—	39	68	20	—	—	—	—	—	Non-album singles
"Quiero saber"	1992	—	—	—	—	—	—	—	—	—	25	Non-album singles
"La quiero"	1993	—	—	—	—	—	—	—	—	—	—	Love and Liberté
"Escucha me"	1993	—	—	—	61	—	—	—	—	—	—	Love and Liberté
"No viviré"	1994	—	—	—	—	—	—	—	—	—	29	Love and Liberté
"Summer Mixes – Hits Medley"	1994	—	—	34	—	12	—	—	—	53	—	Greatest Hits
"La rumba de Nicolas"	1995	—	—	—	—	—	—	—	—	—	—	Estrellas
"A ti a ti"	1995	—	—	—	—	—	—	—	—	—	—	Estrellas
"Solo por ti (Amiwawa)"	1997	—	—	—	—	—	—	—	—	—	—	Compas
"Lo mal y lo bien"	1997	—	—	—	—	—	—	—	—	—	—	Compas
"Oh eh oh eh"	1998	—	—	—	—	—	—	—	—	—	—	Allez! Ola! Olé! – El album oficial de la Copa del Mundo
"Get Up!" (Captain Jack featuring the Gipsy Kings)	1999	—	—	— (Note: "Get Up!" did not enter the Flanders Ultratop chart, but did peak at number 6 on the Ultratip chart.)	23	—	68	—	—	—	—	The Captain's Revenge
"One Love" (with Ziggy Marley and Tsidii Le Loka)	1999	—	—	—	—	—	—	—	—	—	—	2000 Today: A World Symphony for the Millennium
"Ciclone" (Takagi & Ketra, Elodie and Mariah Angeliq featuring Gipsy Kings)	2020	—	—	—	—	9	—	—	—	—	—	Non-album single
"Ingobernable" (C. Tangana with Gipsy Kings)	2021	—	—	—	—	—	—	1	—	—	—	El Madrileño
"—" denotes releases that did not chart or were not released in that territory.

== Videos ==
=== Video albums ===
Title	Details
Live at the Royal Albert Hall	Released: 1989; Label: Telstar; Formats: VHS, LaserDisc; Concert filmed at the Royal Albert Hall for the world tour of the album Gipsy Kings
¡Fuego! The Videos	Released: 1990; Label: Elektra; Formats: VHS; Compilation of Gipsy Kings' music videos
US Tour 90	Released: 1991; Label: Pioneer Artists; Formats: VHS, LaserDisc; Concert filmed in July 1990 by Freddy Hausser at the Greek Theatre in Los Angeles during the tour for the album Mosaïque
Roots: The Recordings	Released: 2004; Label: Sine; Formats: DVD; Bonus DVD with the special edition of the album Roots
Live at the Kenwood House in London	Released: 2005; Label: Black Hill Pictures; Formats: DVD; Concert at Kenwood House during the tour for the album Roots
Tierra Gitana & Live in Concert	Released: 22 July 2005; Label: Sony BMG; Formats: DVD; Documentary and concert from the 1990 world tour

=== Music videos ===
Year	Title	Album
1988	"Bamboléo"	Gipsy Kings
1988	"Djobi Djoba"	Gipsy Kings
1989	"Vamos a bailar"	Mosaïque
1989	"Volaré"	Mosaïque
1991	"Baila me"	Este Mundo
1991	"Sin ella"	Este Mundo
1991	"I've Got No Strings"	Simply Mad About the Mouse
1992	"Pida me la"	non-album
1993	"La quiero"	Love & Liberté
1993	"Escucha me"	Love & Liberté
1995	"La Rumba de Nicolas"	Estrellas
1997	"Solo por ti (Amiwawa)"	Compas
1998	"Oh eh oh eh"	Allez! Ola! Olé! – El album oficial de la Copa del Mundo
1999	"One Love" (with Ziggy Marley and Tsidii Le Loka)	2000 Today: A World Symphony for the Millennium
2004	"Como siento yo"	Roots
2006	"Amor"	Pasajero
