= List of French Grammy Award winners and nominees =

The following is a list of Grammy Awards winners and nominees from France:

Year	Category	Nominees(s)	Nominated for	Result
1960	Best Orchestral Performance	Charles Münch	Debussy: Images for Orchestra	Won
1962	Best Orchestral Performance	Charles Münch	Ravel: Daphnis et Chloé	Won
1963	Best New Artist	The Swingle Singers		Won
1963	Best Performance by a Chorus	The Swingle Singers	Bach's Greatest Hits	Won
1965	Best Performance by a Chorus	The Swingle Singers	Going Baroque	Won
1966	Best Performance by a Chorus	The Swingle Singers	Anyone for Mozart?	Won
1967	Best Performance by a Chorus	The Swingle Singers	Rococo Á Go Go	Nominated
1968	Best Performance by a Chorus	The Swingle Singers	Encounter	Nominated
1969	Best Orchestral Performance	Pierre Boulez	Debussy: La Mer; Prélude à l'après-midi d'un faune; Jeux	Won
1970	Best Orchestral Performance	Pierre Boulez	Debussy: Vol. 2 "Images Pour Orchestre"	Won
1970	Best Choral Performance, Classical (other than opera)	The Swingle Singers	Berio: Sinfonia	Won
1970	Grammy Award for Best Jazz Instrumental Album	Jean-Luc Ponty	Violin Summit	Nominated
1971	Best Orchestral Performance	Pierre Boulez	Stravinsky: Le Sacre du Printemps	Won
1972	Best Instrumental Composition	Michel Legrand	"Theme From Summer of '42"	Won
1973	Best Instrumental Composition	Michel Legrand	"Theme from Brian's Song"	Nominated
1974	Best Orchestral Performance	Michel Legrand	Bartók: Concerto for Orchestra	Won
1976	Best Orchestral Performance	Michel Legrand	Ravel: Daphnis et Chloé	Won
1979	Best Orchestral Performance	Michel Glotz	Beethoven: Symphony No. 9	Won
1981	Best Rock Instrumental Performance	Jean-Luc Ponty	"Beach Girl"	Nominated
1990	Best Contemporary Folk Recording	Gipsy Kings	"Bamboléo"	Nominated
1992	Best World Music Album	Gipsy Kings	Este Mundo	Nominated
1993	Best World Music Album	Gipsy Kings	Live	Nominated
1994	Best Orchestral Performance	Pierre Boulez	Bartók: The Wooden Prince	Won
1995	Best Orchestral Performance	Pierre Boulez	Bartók: Concerto for Orchestra; Four Orchestral Pieces, Op. 12	Won
1995	Best World Music Album	Gipsy Kings	Love and Liberté	Nominated
1996	Best World Music Album	Deep Forest	Boheme	Won
1996	Best Orchestral Performance	Pierre Boulez	Debussy: La Mer	Won
1997	Best World Music Album	Gipsy Kings	Tierra Gitana	Nominated
1998	Best World Music Album	Gipsy Kings	Compas	Nominated
1998	Best Dance Recording	Daft Punk	"Da Funk"	Nominated
1998	Best Orchestral Performance	Pierre Boulez	Berlioz:Symphonie Fantastique; Tristia	Won
1999	Best Orchestral Performance	Pierre Boulez	Mahler: Symphony No. 9	Won
1999	Best Dance Recording	Daft Punk	"Around The World"	Nominated
2002	Best Pop Instrumental Performance	Daft Punk	"Short Circuit"	Nominated
2002	Best Dance Recording	Daft Punk	"One More Time"	Nominated
2005	Best Contemporary World Music Album	Gipsy Kings	Roots	Nominated
2006	Best Electronic/Dance Album	Daft Punk	Human After All	Nominated
2008	Best Dance Recording	Daft Punk	"Harder, Better, Faster, Stronger"	Won
2008	Best Electronic/Dance Album	Daft Punk	Alive 2007	Won
2009	Best Dance/Electronic Album	Justice	Audio, Video, Disco.	Won
2010	Best Alternative Album	Phoenix	Wolfgang Amadeus Phoenix	Won
2011	Best Dance Recording	Sandy Vee	"Only Girl (In the World)"	Won
2011	Album of the Year	Sandy Vee	Teenage Dream	Nominated
2012	Record of the Year	Sandy Vee	"Firework"	Nominated
2012	Album of the Year	Sandy Vee	Loud	Nominated
2012	Best Score Soundtrack For Visual Media	Daft Punk	Tron: Legacy	Nominated
2014	Best World Music Album	Gipsy Kings	Savor Flamenco	Won
2014	Record of the Year	Daft Punk	"Get Lucky"	Won
2014	Album of the Year	Daft Punk	Random Access Memories	Won
2014	Best Pop Duo/Group Performance	Daft Punk	"Get Lucky"	Won
2014	Best Dance/Electronica Album	Daft Punk	Random Access Memories	Won
2015	Best Original Score for Visual Media	Alexandre Desplat	The Grand Budapest Hotel	Won
2017	Best Metal Performance	Gojira	"Silvera"	Nominated
2017	Rock Album	Gojira	Magma	Nominated
2018	Best Music Video	Jain	Makeba	Nominated
2019	Best Dance/Electronic Album	Justice	Woman Worldwide	Won
2021	Best Dance/Electronic Album	Madeon	Good Faith	Nominated
2022	Best Global Music Album	Ibrahim Maalouf	Queen of Sheba	Nominated
2025	Best Metal Performance	Gojira	Mea Culpa (Ah ! Ça ira !)	Won
2025	Best Dance/Electronic Recording	Justice	Neverender	Won
2026	Grammy Award for Best Remixed Recording, Non-Classical	Gesaffelstein	Abracadabra	Won
