= Chico Bouchikhi =

French musician (born 1954)

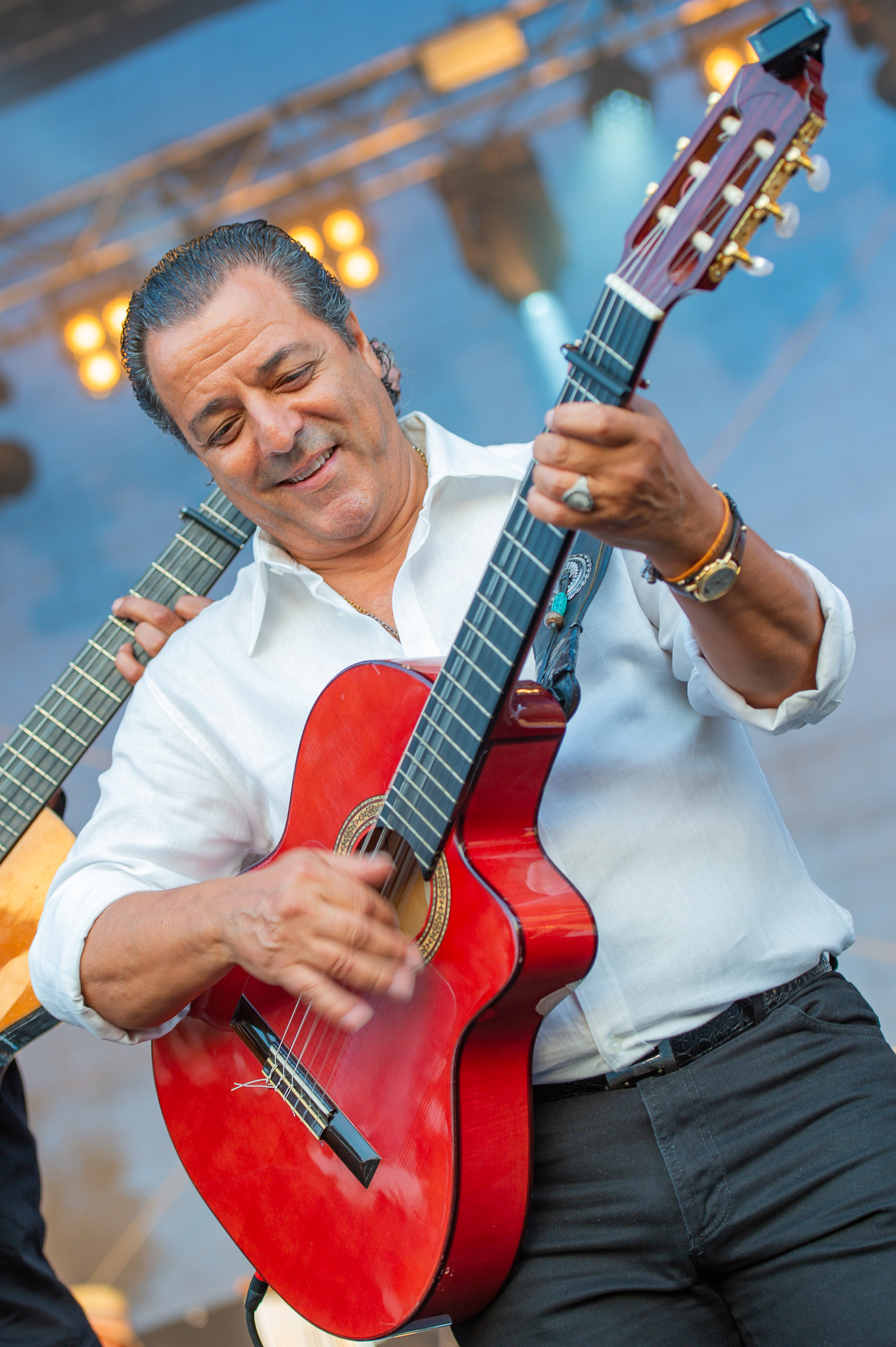
- Bouchikhi in 2018

Background information
- Born: Jalloul Bouchikhi; 13 October 1954 (age 71); Arles, France
- Genres: Rumba catalana; flamenco; Latin pop; Latin rock
- Occupation: Musician
- Instruments: Guitar, vocals
- Member of: Chico & the Gypsies
- Formerly of: Gipsy Kings
- Spouse: Marthe Reyes (div.)
- Website: chico.fr/chicowp

Jalloul "Chico" Bouchikhi (Arabic: جلول البوشيخي; born 13 October 1954) is a French musician and a co-founder of the Gipsy Kings. After leaving the band in 1991, he formed his own group, Chico & the Gypsies.

== Early life ==
Bouchikhi was born in Arles, France, to a Moroccan father from Oujda and an Algerian mother from Tlemcen. He was married to Marthe Reyes, daughter of José Reyes, the father of the Reyes sons, members of the group Gipsy Kings.

== Career ==
In 1979, upon the death of their father, José, the five Reyes brothers from Arles (Nicolas, Canut, André, Patchaï, and Pablo), who had up to that point been performing as a family band named José et Los Reyes, were joined by their cousins Diego, Paco, and Tonino Baliardo (nephews of Manitas de Plata) from Montpellier, and together with Bouchikhi, who was then married to Marthe Reyes, José's daughter, formed the group Gipsy Kings. They traveled around France and played at weddings, festivals, and in the streets, with Nicolas as lead vocalist and Tonino on lead guitar. The group eventually became world-famous with such songs as "Djobi Djoba", "Bamboléo", and "Un Amor".

In 1991, Bouchikhi left Gipsy Kings due to financial disagreements with their then-manager, Claude Martinez, and went on to start his own group, Chico & the Gypsies. The band has released numerous albums since 1992.

== Personal life ==
Bouchikhi's brother, Ahmed, was assassinated by Mossad agents in the Norwegian town of Lillehammer in July 1973, in what came to be known as the Lillehammer affair. Ahmed, a waiter, had been mistaken for Ali Hassan Salameh.

Bouchikhi is a UNESCO special envoy for peace. In 1994, he was invited to play before Shimon Peres and Yasser Arafat during the Oslo Accords peace negotiations.

In 2001, he unsuccessfully ran in the municipal elections of Arles.

In 2014, Bouchikhi visited Israel. When asked in an interview with The Independent about his decision to refuse to participate in a boycott of the country, he insisted that reconciliation was more important than holding grudges.

Bouchikhi lives in Arles, where he owns a restaurant and music venue called Patio de Camargue.

== Discography ==
=== with the Gipsy Kings ===
- Allegria (1982)
- Luna de Fuego (1983)
- Gipsy Kings (1988)
- Mosaïque (1989)

=== with Chico & the Gypsies ===
- Tengo Tengo (1992)
- Vagabundo (1996)
- Nomade (1998)
- Bamboleo (2003)
- Freedom (2005)
- Suerte (2008)
- Chantent Charles Aznavour (2011)
- Chico & the Gypsies... & Friends (2012)
- Fiesta (2013)
- Chico & the Gypsies & International Friends (2014)
- Color 80's (2016)
- Color 80's Vol. 2 (2016)
- Mi corazón (2018)
- Unidos with Hasna (2021)
- Gipsy Guitar (2022)
- Otro Camino (2023)
