= ¡Volaré! The Very Best of the Gipsy Kings =

Compilation album by Gipsy Kings
- Released: 1999
- Genre: Latin
- Length: 2:31:06

Gipsy Kings chronology
Compas (1997)	¡Volaré! The Very Best of the Gipsy Kings (1999)	Somos Gitanos (2001)

Professional ratings
Review scores
Source	Rating
The Encyclopedia of Popular Music	4/5 stars

¡Volaré! The Very Best of the Gipsy Kings is a compilation album by the French rumba catalana band Gipsy Kings, which was released in 1999 in Europe, Japan and Mexico. The US version released in 2000 is identical with the omission of "Hitmix '99 (Radio Edit)", which appears as track #20 on the first CD1 of the other versions.

"Pida me la" previously only appeared on the European compilation album Greatest Hits. Also, "Sin ella", "La doña", and "Quiero saber" are slightly different remastered versions of their Live album.

"Oh Èh Oh Èh" was first released on 1998 compilation Allez! Ola! Olé! (El album oficial de la copa del mundo). "I've Got No Strings" comes from the 1991 compilation to Disney's project Simply Mad About The Mouse. Gipsy Kings's spanish remix of "Hotel California" was first released on the 1990 compilation Rubáiyát: Elektra's 40th Anniversary.

== Track listing ==
CD 1
No.	Title	Length
1.	"Volare (Nel blu dipinto di blu)"	3:39
2.	"Bamboleo"	3:24
3.	"Djobi Djoba"	3:25
4.	"Bem, bem, Maria"	3:04
5.	"Baila me"	3:45
6.	"Pida me la"	3:11
7.	"Soy"	3:11
8.	"Sin ella" (Live)	4:35
9.	"Vamos a bailar"	4:55
10.	"A Ti A Ti"	3:45
11.	"La rumba de Nicolás"	3:56
12.	"No viviré"	4:07
13.	"Alegria" (Instrumental & Live)	2:53
14.	"La doña" (Live)	4:37
15.	"Oy"	4:50
16.	"A tu vera"	3:11
17.	"Ami Wa Wa [Solo por ti]"	3:59
18.	"Oh Èh Oh Èh" (Live)	3:20
19.	"A mi manera"	3:52
20.	"Hitmix '99 [Radio Edit]"	3:53

CD 2
No.	Title	Length
1.	"Tú quieres volver"	3:13
2.	"Un amor"	3:38
3.	"Escucha me"	4:37
4.	"Habla me"	4:05
5.	"No Volvere"	3:51
6.	"Caminando por la calle"	4:18
7.	"Mujer"	4:15
8.	"Este mundo"	4:09
9.	"Ternuras" (Instrumental)	3:26
10.	"Quiero saber" (Live)	4:39
11.	"Inspiration" (Instrumental)	3:42
12.	"El camino"	5:04
13.	"Trista pena"	4:31
14.	"Viento del arena"	5:28
15.	"Passion" (Instrumental)	3:02
16.	"Mi corazón"	4:30
17.	"I've Got No Strings"	3:16
18.	"Hotel California (Spanish Mix)"	5:46

== Charts ==
Chart (1999)	Peak position
Australian Albums (ARIA Charts)	82

== Certifications ==
Region	Certification	Certified units/sales
Canada (Music Canada)	Gold	50,000^{^}
United Kingdom (BPI)	Silver	60,000^{^}
United States	—	245,000
^{^} Shipments figures based on certification alone.
