= The Best of the Gipsy Kings =

Greatest hits album by Gipsy Kings
- Released: March 28, 1995
- Genre: Catalan rumba
- Length: 73:46
- Label: Nonesuch

Gipsy Kings chronology
Greatest Hits (1994)	The Best of the Gipsy Kings (1995)	Estrellas (1995)

Professional ratings
Review scores
Source	Rating
The Encyclopedia of Popular Music	3/5 stars

The Best of the Gipsy Kings is an album from the band Gipsy Kings. It was released on March 28, 1995, in the US.

A compilation of previous albums, which also includes a live release of "La Dona", "Galaxia" and "Vamos a Bailar" (previously released on Allegria) and the popular party Medley (consisting of a mix of Bamboleo, Volare, Djobi Djoba, Pida Me La and Baila Me).

It also includes the new song "A Tu Vera" in an acoustic tone. That song will only be re-released as a re-recorded version on the album Estrellas and its American version Tierra Gitana.

Greatest Hits which was released a year prior for European audience is a very similar compilation with a different song order and the replacement of "Viento Del Arena", "Quiero Saber", "Montaña", "Trista Pena", "Love & Liberté" and "A Tu Vera" by "Pida Me La", "A Mi Manera", "Tu Quieres Volver", "Soy", "La Quiero" and "Allegria". Also "La Dona" and "Galaxia" on this album are the live versions while the ones on Greatest Hits are studio versions. The song "Escucha Me" is also slightly different.

With over 1.5 million sales, as of October 2017, The Best of the Gipsy Kings is the third bestselling Latin album in the US.

== Track listing ==
No.	Title	Length
1.	"Djobi Djoba"	3:26
2.	"Viento del Arena"	5:31
3.	"Baila Me"	3:48
4.	"Un Amor"	3:42
5.	"Moorea" (Instrumental)	4:03
6.	"Volare"	3:42
7.	"Quiero Saber"	4:09
8.	"Escucha Me"	4:02
9.	"La Dona" (Live)	4:36
10.	"Montaña"	5:25
11.	"Bem, Bem, Maria"	3:08
12.	"Trista Pena"	4:35
13.	"Bamboleo"	3:27
14.	"Galaxia" (Live)	2:47
15.	"Vamos a Bailar" (Live)	5:05
16.	"Love and Liberté" (Instrumental)	3:57
17.	"A Tu Vera"	3:19
18.	"Medley - [ Bamboleo - Volare - Djobi Djoba - Pida Me La - Baila Me]"	4:48

== Charts ==
=== Weekly charts ===
Chart (1995)	Peak position
US Billboard 200	105
US Top Latin Albums (Billboard)	2
US Latin Pop Albums (Billboard)	1

=== Year-end charts ===
Chart (1995)	Position
US Top Latin Albums (Billboard)	3

== Sales and certifications ==
Region	Certification	Certified units/sales
France (SNEP)	2× Gold	200,000^{*}
Ireland (IRMA)	Platinum	15,000^{^}
United States (RIAA)	Platinum	1,563,000
^{*} Sales figures based on certification alone.^{^} Shipments figures based on certification alone.

== See also ==
- List of number-one Billboard Latin Pop Albums from the 1990s
- List of best-selling Latin albums in the United States
