= Chico & the Gypsies =

French musical group

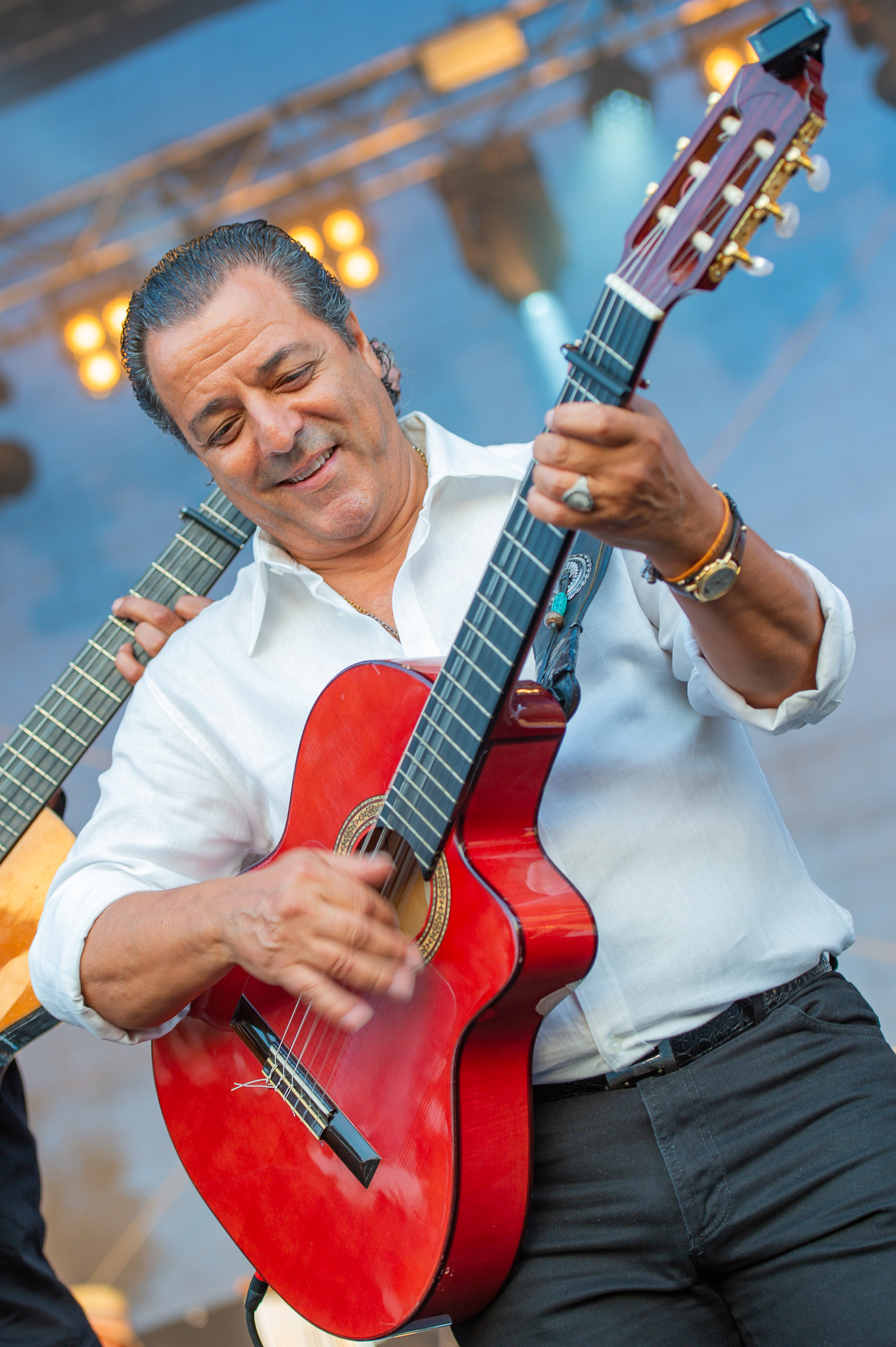
- Chico Bouchikhi performing in 2018

Background information
- Origin: Arles, France
- Genres: Rumba catalana; flamenco; Latin pop; Latin rock
- Years active: 1992–present
- Spinoff of: Gipsy Kings
- Members: Chico Bouchikhi; Christophe Baliardo; Jean Farre; Jean-Claude Vila; Jean-Pierre Cargol Baliardo
- Past members: Joseph Gautier; Alain Bourguet
- Website: chico.fr

Chico & the Gypsies is a French Gitano band that plays Catalan rumba, flamenco, Latin pop, and Latin rock. It is led by Chico Bouchikhi, one of the founders of the Gipsy Kings. A year after leaving that band, in 1991, he formed the Gypsies in his hometown of Arles.

== Band members ==
Current

- Chico Bouchikhi – guitar
- Christophe Baliardo – guitar
- Jean Farre – guitar
- Jean-Claude Vila – guitar, vocals
- Jean-Pierre Cargol Baliardo – guitar, vocals

Past

- Joseph Gautier – guitar, lead vocals (2009–2020)
- Alain Bourguet – guitar, vocals

== Trivia ==
Guitarist Jean-Pierre Cargol Baliardo appeared in the title role of François Truffaut's 1970 film The Wild Child.

== Discography ==
Studio albums

Year	Album	Charts		Certification
Year	Album	FR	BEL (Wa)	Certification
1992	Tengo Tengo	–	–	
1996	Vagabundo	39	–	
1998	Nomade	–	–	
2003	Bamboleo	–	–	
2004	Disque d'or	–	–	
2005	Freedom	12	–	
2008	Suerte	43	–	
2011	Chantent Charles Aznavour	78	–	
2012	Chico & The Gypsies... & Friends	8	20	
2013	Fiesta	11	34	
2014	Chico & The Gypsies & International Friends	60	103	
2016	Color 80's	9	54	
2016	Color 80's Vol. 2	47	33	
2018	Mi corazón	4	26	
"—" denotes a title that did not chart, or was not released in that territory.

Live albums

Year	Album	Charts	Certification
Year	Album	FR	Certification
1992	Live – Olympia Bruno Coquatrix	96	
2012	Live à l'Olympia		

Singles

Year	Single	Charts	Certification	Album
Year	Single	FR	Certification	Album
1996	"Marina"	30		
1998	"Nomade 'Ya Rayah'"	65		Nomade

== See also ==
- New Flamenco
- Flamenco rumba
