= Pasajero (Gipsy Kings album) =

Studio album by Gipsy Kings
- Released: October 3, 2006
- Recorded: at Studio Calm, Paris.
- Genre: Rumba flamenca, Catalan rumba
- Length: 52:24
- Label: Nonesuch Records
- Producer: Philippe Eidel, Gipsy Kings

Gipsy Kings chronology
Roots (2004)	Pasajero (2006)	Savor Flamenco (2013)

Professional ratings
Review scores
Source	Rating
AllMusic	3.5/5 stars
The Encyclopedia of Popular Music	3/5 stars

Pasajero (Traveler) is the twelfth studio album from the band Gipsy Kings. It was originally released on October 3, 2006, internationally and released in the United States on January 23, 2007. Both versions are identical.

== Track listing ==
No.	Title	Length
1.	"Si Tú me Quieres"	3:11
2.	"Pueblos"	2:58
3.	"Mira la Chica"	2:51
4.	"Café"	3:22
5.	"Chan Chan"	2:46
6.	"Canastero" (Instrumental)	3:57
7.	"¿Dónde Estás, Mi Amor?"	3:37
8.	"Amor"	3:26
9.	"La Tounga"	3:28
10.	"Sol y Luna"	3:24
11.	"Guaranga" (Instrumental)	3:17
12.	"Pasajero"	3:05
13.	"Recuerdos A Zucarados" (Instrumental)	3:04
14.	"La Vida de Gipsy"	3:40

== Credits ==
- Executive producer – Freddy Lamotte, Pascal Imbert, Peter Himberger
- Mixed and recording – Frank Redlich - mixing, recording
- Producer – The Gipsy Kings*, Philippe Eidel
- Writing credits: Antonio Rivas (track 13), Francisco Repilado (track 5), Gipsy Kings (tracks 1 2 3 4 6 7 8 9 10 11 12 13 14), Philippe Eidel (track 3)

== Charts ==
Chart (2006)	Peak position
Australian Albums (ARIA Charts)	96
French Albums (SNEP)	74
Swiss Albums (Schweizer Hitparade)	89
UK Independent Albums (OCC)	15
