= Antonio Rivas =

Antonio Rivas may refer to:

- Antonio Rivas Mercado (1853-1927), Mexican architect
- Antonio Rivas (musician) (born 1949), Colombian accordion player
- Antonio Rivas (Colombian footballer) (born 1951), Colombian former footballer
- Antonio Rivas Villalobos (born 1961), Chilean educator and politician
- Antonio Rivas (Spanish footballer) (born 1965), Spanish coach and retired footballer
