= Love Songs (Gipsy Kings album) =

Greatest hits album by Gipsy Kings
- Released: 1996
- Genre: Flamenco
- Label: Nonesuch Records 79510-2 (Cantos de Amor)

Gipsy Kings chronology
Tierra Gitana (1995)	Love Songs (1996)	Compas (1997)

Cantos de Amor artwork

Love Songs is a "best of" album by the French Rumba Catalana band Gipsy Kings, which was released in 1996. It includes the new unreleased song "Gitano Soy". A US release of this album has been released in 1998 for USA audience under the name Cantos de Amor.

== Track listing ==
No.	Title	Length
1.	"Un Amor"	3:40
2.	"Gitano Soy"	4:27
3.	"A Mi Manera"	3:52
4.	"No Volvere"	3:50
5.	"Love & Liberté" (Instrumental)	3:55
6.	"Quiero Saber"	4:07
7.	"Mi Corazon"	4:29
8.	"Caminando Por La Calle"	4:22
9.	"Madre Mia"	3:51
10.	"Passion" (Instrumental)	3:04
11.	"Habla Me"	5:44
12.	"Tu Quieres Volver"	4:37
13.	"Mujer"	4:15
14.	"Trista Pena"	5:40
15.	"Inspiration" (Instrumental)	3:43
