= Vamos a Bailar =

Vamos a Bailar (Spanish: 'Let's Go to Dance') may refer to:

- "Vamos a bailar (Esta vida nueva)", a song by Paola & Chiara
- "Vamos a Bailar", a song by Cristian Castro from Hoy Quiero Soñar
- "Vamos a Bailar", a song by Gipsy Kings from their eponymous album
  - "Vamos a Bailar (Live)", a live version of the song from Mosaïque
- "Vamos a Bailar", a song by K-Paz de la Sierra from their album Pensando En Ti
- "Vamos a Bailar", a song by Marciano Cantero
- "Vamos a Bailar", a song by María Conchita Alonso from the Scarface soundtrack
- "Vamos a Bailar", a song by Parchís
