= Greatest Hits (Gipsy Kings album) =

Greatest hits album by Gipsy Kings
- Released: 1994
- Genre: Flamenco
- Length: 66:57
- Label: Columbia

Gipsy Kings chronology
| Love and Liberté (1993) | Greatest Hits (1994) | The Best of the Gipsy Kings (1995) |

Professional ratings
Review scores
| Source | Rating |
|---|---|
| Music Week | 3/5 stars |

Greatest Hits is a best of album by the French rumba catalana band Gipsy Kings, which was released in 1994 in Europe.

== Overview ==
More than a simple compilation of previous albums, it also includes the 1992 single "Pida Me La", a studio release of "Galaxia", "Allegria" and "La Dona" (previously released live on Allegria), a more energetic release of "Vamos a Bailar" from the LP version and the popular party Medley (consisting of a mix of Bamboleo, Volare, Djobi Djoba, Pida Me La and Baila Me].

The tune "Este Mundo" (from the album Este Mundo) is track 18 on the Japanese version of the album; track 19 is the "Medley".

A similar compilation, The Best of the Gipsy Kings, was released a year later in the US; it has a different song order and replaces "Pida Me La", "A Mi Manera", "Tu Quieres Volver", "Soy", "La Quiero" and "Allegria" with "Viento Del Arena", "Quiero Saber", "Montaña", "Trista Pena", "Love & Liberté" and the previously unreleased "A Tu Vera". Also, while "La Dona" and "Galaxia" on the Greatest Hits album are the studio versions, the ones on The Best of the Gipsy Kings are live versions. The song "Escucha Me" is also slightly different.

== Track listing ==
Greatest Hits track listing
| No. | Title | Length |
|---|---|---|
| 1. | "Djobi Djoba" | 3:27 |
| 2. | "Baila Me" | 3:47 |
| 3. | "Bamboléo" | 3:25 |
| 4. | "Pida Me La" | 3:18 |
| 5. | "Bem, Bem, Maria" | 3:06 |
| 6. | "Volare" | 3:41 |
| 7. | "Moorea" (Instrumental) | 4:05 |
| 8. | "A Mi Manera" | 3:54 |
| 9. | "Un Amor" | 3:40 |
| 10. | "Galaxia" (studio, instrumental) | 2:37 |
| 11. | "Escucha Me" | 4:39 |
| 12. | "Tu Quieres Volver" | 3:14 |
| 13. | "Soy" | 3:12 |
| 14. | "La Quiero" | 3:45 |
| 15. | "Allegria" (studio, instrumental) | 2:50 |
| 16. | "Vamos a Bailar" (LP version) | 4:56 |
| 17. | "La Dona" (Studio) | 4:35 |
| 18. | "Medley (Bamboléo – Volare – Djobi Djoba – Pida Me La – Baila Me)" | 4:48 |
| Total length: | | 66:57 |

== Charts and certifications ==
=== Weekly charts ===
Weekly chart performance for Greatest Hits
| Chart (1994–1996) | Peak position |
|---|---|
| Austrian Albums (Ö3 Austria) | 3 |
| Belgian Albums (Ultratop Flanders) | 32 |
| Belgian Albums (Ultratop Wallonia) | 47 |
| Dutch Albums (Album Top 100) | 6 |
| German Albums (Offizielle Top 100) | 6 |
| Hungarian Albums (MAHASZ) | 9 |
| New Zealand Albums (RMNZ) | 48 |
| Portuguese Albums (AFP) | 27 |
| Swedish Albums (Sverigetopplistan) | 5 |
| Swiss Albums (Schweizer Hitparade) | 3 |

=== Year-end charts ===
Year-end chart performance for Greatest Hits
| Chart (1994) | Position |
|---|---|
| Austrian Albums (Ö3 Austria) | 39 |
| Dutch Albums (Album Top 100) | 76 |
| German Albums (Offizielle Top 100) | 46 |
| Swiss Albums (Schweizer Hitparade) | 26 |

=== Sales and certifications ===
Sales and certifications for Greatest Hits
| Region | Certification | Certified units/sales |
|---|---|---|
| Argentina (CAPIF) | Platinum | 60,000^{^} |
| Austria (IFPI Austria) | Gold | 25,000^{*} |
| Belgium (BRMA) | Gold | 25,000^{*} |
| Canada (Music Canada) | 2× Platinum | 200,000^{^} |
| France (SNEP) | Platinum | 300,000^{*} |
| Germany (BVMI) | Gold | 250,000^{^} |
| Hungary (MAHASZ) | Platinum | |
| Japan (RIAJ) | Gold | 100,000^{^} |
| Netherlands (NVPI) | Gold | 50,000^{^} |
| Norway (IFPI Norway) | Gold | 25,000^{*} |
| Switzerland (IFPI Switzerland) | Platinum | 50,000^{^} |
| United Kingdom (BPI) | Gold | 100,000^{*} |
| United States (RIAA) | 3× Platinum | 3,000,000^{^} |
| Uruguay (CUD) | Gold | 3,000^{^} |
^{*} Sales figures based on certification alone.^{^} Shipments figures based on certification alone.
