= Manitas de Plata =

Spanish flamenco guitarist (1921–2014)

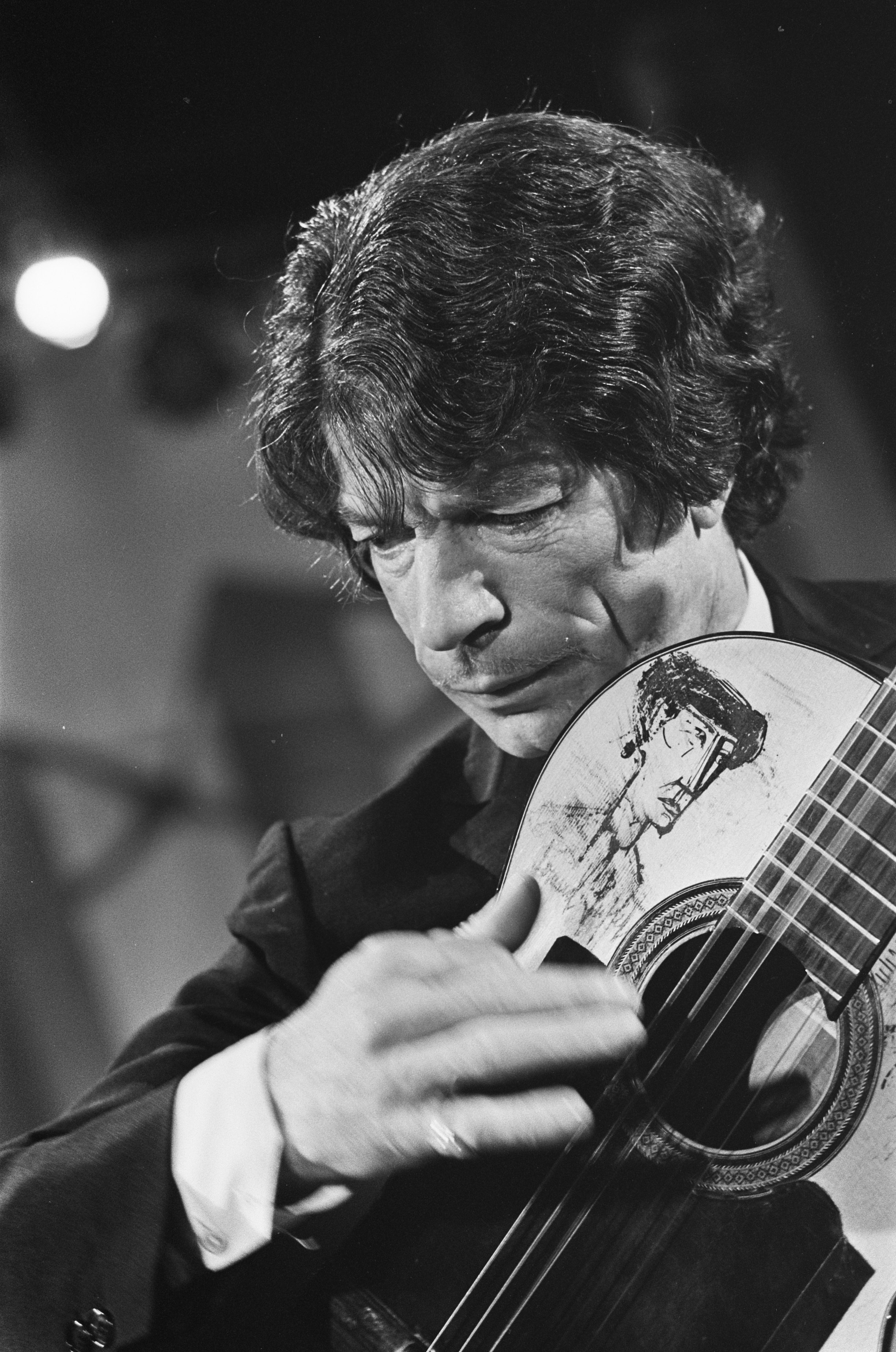
- Manitas de Plata in 1968

Background information
- Born: Ricardo Baliardo; 7 August 1921; Sète, France
- Died: 5 November 2014 (aged 93) Montpellier, France
- Genre: Flamenco
- Occupation: Musician
- Instrument: Guitar

Ricardo Baliardo (7 August 1921 – 5 November 2014), better known as Manitas de Plata ("little hands of silver"), was a French flamenco guitarist of Catalan Gitano descent, born in southern France.

== Life and career ==
Baliardo was born in a gypsy caravan in Sète, southern France.

Nicknamed Manitas de Plata ("little hands of silver" in Spanish), he agreed to play in public only ten years after the death of Romani-Belgian jazz guitarist and composer Django Reinhardt, in 1953.

Baliardo attained fame in the United States after a photography exhibition in New York, organized by his friend Lucien Clergue. He had recorded his first official album in the chapel of Arles in France in 1963, on the Philips label. It was later re-released in 1967, on the Connoisseur Society label and sold through the Book of the Month Club. This record brought him to the attention of an American audience, where a manager obtained a booking for him to play a concert at Carnegie Hall in New York on 24 November 1965, and on The Ed Sullivan Show the same year. He went on to perform in various venues around the world.

Manitas de Plata was the uncle of Diego, Paco, and Tonino Baliardo, and cousin to Pablo, François (Canut), Patchaï, Nicolas, and André Reyes (the sons of his cousin, flamenco artist José Reyes, with whom he performed as a duo in the 1970s), all current or former members of the Catalan rumba band Gipsy Kings.

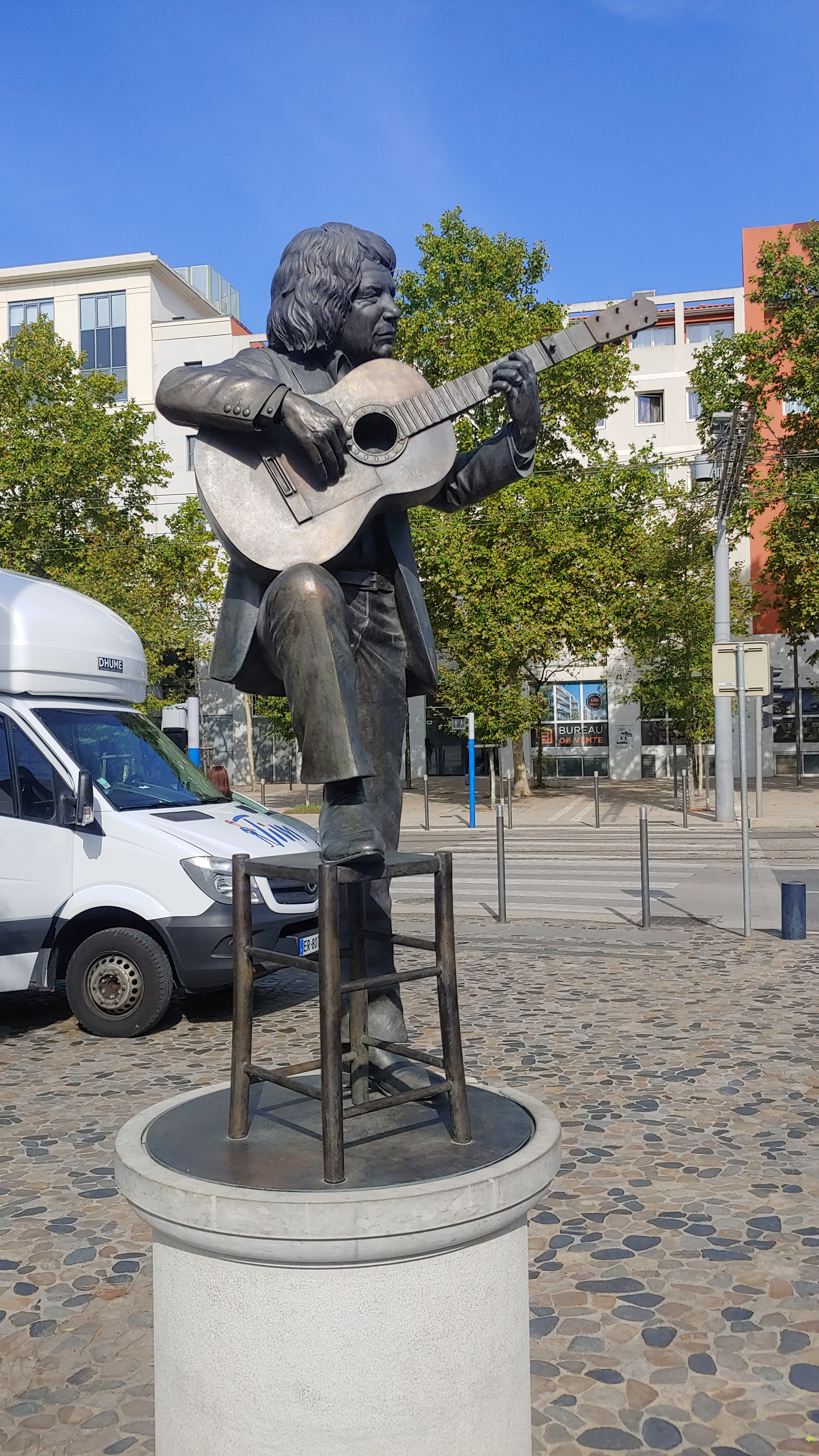
Statue of Manitas de Plata in front of Hôtel de Ville, Montpellier

De Plata died on 6 November 2014, aged 93, in a retirement home in Montpellier. He had suffered a severe heart attack in April 2013.

== Acclaim and legacy ==
One of his recordings earned him a letter from Jean Cocteau, acclaiming him as a creator. Upon hearing him play at Arles in 1964, Pablo Picasso is said to have exclaimed, "that man is of greater worth than I am!" and proceeded to draw on Baliardo's guitar. Australian multi-instrumentalist Chris Freeman, his student in 1971, acknowledged de Plata's influence and teachings.

A statue by the sculptor Jean-Loup Bouvier, depicting de Plata playing his guitar, was erected in front of Hôtel de Ville, Montpellier, in June 2017.

== Selected albums ==
- Juerga! (1963)
- Flamenco Guitar (1965)
- Manitas de Plata – The World's Greatest Living Flamenco Artist (1966)
- Manitas et les siens (1967)
- Flamenco Magic (1967)
- Flamenco!! (L'Espagne De Manitas) (1968)
- The Art of the Guitar (1968)
- La guitare d'or de Manitas (1970)
- Et Ses Guitares Gitanes (1972)
- Excitement of Manitas De Plata (1973)
- Hommages (1973)
- Soleil des Saintes-Maries (1978)
- Feria Gitane (1994)
- Olé (1969)
- Manitas de Plata at Carnegie Hall (1995)
- Flaming Flamenco (1997)
- Manitas de Plata (1998)
- Camargue de Manitas (1999)
- Guitare D'Or Manitas de Plata (1999)
- Flores de mi corazon (1999)
- Guitarra Flamenco (2001)
- Manitas de Plata y los Plateros (2004)

== See also ==
- Los Niños de Sara
