= Somos Gitanos =

Studio album by Gipsy Kings
- Released: October 2001
- Genre: Flamenco
- Length: 48:43
- Label: Columbia
- Producer: Claude Martinez

Gipsy Kings chronology
| ¡Volaré! The Very Best of the Gipsy Kings (1999) | Somos Gitanos (2001) | Roots (2004) |

Professional ratings
Review scores
| Source | Rating |
|---|---|
| AllMusic | 3/5 stars |
| The Encyclopedia of Popular Music | 3/5 stars |

Somos Gitanos is the tenth studio album by the Gipsy Kings released in October 2001. It was released in 2001 in the US, Mexico, and Japan with different song orders. The Mexican and Japanese releases have the bonus song "One Love" written by Bob Marley. The Japanese release also has the bonus songs "Inspiration" and "Volare" that appeared on Gipsy Kings and Mosaïque respectively.

== Track listing ==
American version
| No. | Title | Length |
|---|---|---|
| 1. | "Somos Gitanos" | 3:40 |
| 2. | "Majiwi" | 4:29 |
| 3. | "Mi Fandango" | 4:53 |
| 4. | "Como Un Silencio" | 4:49 |
| 5. | "Lleva Me El Compás" | 3:31 |
| 6. | "Felices Dias" | 3:34 |
| 7. | "Poquito A Poco" | 3:10 |
| 8. | "Magia Del Ritmo" | 4:04 |
| 9. | "Quiero Libertad" | 4:09 |
| 10. | "Jo Busco un Camino" | 4:14 |
| 11. | "Flamencos en El Aire" (Instrumental) | 4:04 |
| 12. | "Solo, Solo Diré" | 3:53 |

Mexican version
| No. | Title | Length |
|---|---|---|
| 1. | "Somos Gitanos" | 3:40 |
| 2. | "Magia Del Ritmo" | 4:04 |
| 3. | "Quiero Libertad" | 4:09 |
| 4. | "Poquito A Poco" | 3:10 |
| 5. | "Lleva Me El Compás" | 3:31 |
| 6. | "Felices Dias" | 3:34 |
| 7. | "Solo, Solo Diré" | 3:53 |
| 8. | "Majiwi" | 4:29 |
| 9. | "Como Un Silencio" | 4:49 |
| 10. | "Jo Busco un Camino" | 4:14 |
| 11. | "Flamencos en El Aire" (Instrumental) | 4:04 |
| 12. | "Mi Fandango" | 4:53 |
| 13. | "One Love" | 3:44 |

Japanese version
| No. | Title | Length |
|---|---|---|
| 1. | "Somos Gitanos" | 3:40 |
| 2. | "Magia Del Ritmo" | 4:04 |
| 3. | "Quiero Libertad" | 4:09 |
| 4. | "Poquito A Poco" | 3:10 |
| 5. | "Lleva Me El Compás" | 3:31 |
| 6. | "Felices Dias" | 3:34 |
| 7. | "Solo, Solo Diré" | 3:53 |
| 8. | "Majiwi" | 4:29 |
| 9. | "Como Un Silencio" | 4:49 |
| 10. | "Jo Busco un Camino" | 4:14 |
| 11. | "Flamencos en El Aire" (Instrumental) | 4:04 |
| 12. | "Mi Fandango" | 4:53 |
| 13. | "One Love" | 3:44 |
| 14. | "Inspiration" | 3:41 |
| 15. | "Volare" | 3:38 |

== Personnel ==
- Ney - Abdelhamid Hmaoui
- Composer, Rhythm Guitar, Palmas, Vocals, Background Vocals - Andre Reyes
- Drums - Andre Ceccarelli
- Accordion, Piano - Bob Boisadan
- Producer - Claude Martinez
- Percussion - Dennis Benarrosh
- Acoustic Guitar, Keyboards, Organ - Dominique Droin
- Accordion - Dominique Vernhes
- Engineer, Mixing, Tambourine - Eric Berdeaux
- Engineer - Francois Delabriere
- Composer, Rhythm Guitar, Palmas, Background Vocals - George "Baule" Reyes
- Arranger, Bass, Producer, Synthesizer Bass - Gerald Prevost
- Rhythm Guitar, Palmas, Primary Artist - Gipsy Kings
- Engineer - Jean-Marc Labbe
- Electric Guitar - Laurent De Gasperis
- Drums - Marc Jacquemin
- Composer - Marie Claire D'Ubaldo
- Bells, Drums, Timbales - Negrito Trasante-Crocco
- Composer, Vocals, Background Vocals - Nicolas Reyes
- Congas - Pacheco Rodolfo
- Vocals, Background Vocals - Patchai Reyes
- Composer - Paul Reyes
- Photography - Peter Lindbergh
- Darbouka, Percussion - Rabah Khalfa
- Mastering - Raphael Jonin
- Bouzouki, Oud - Thierry Robin
- Composer, Guitar - Tonino Baliardo
