= Hôtel de Ville, Montpellier =

Town hall in Montpellier, France

Hôtel de Ville
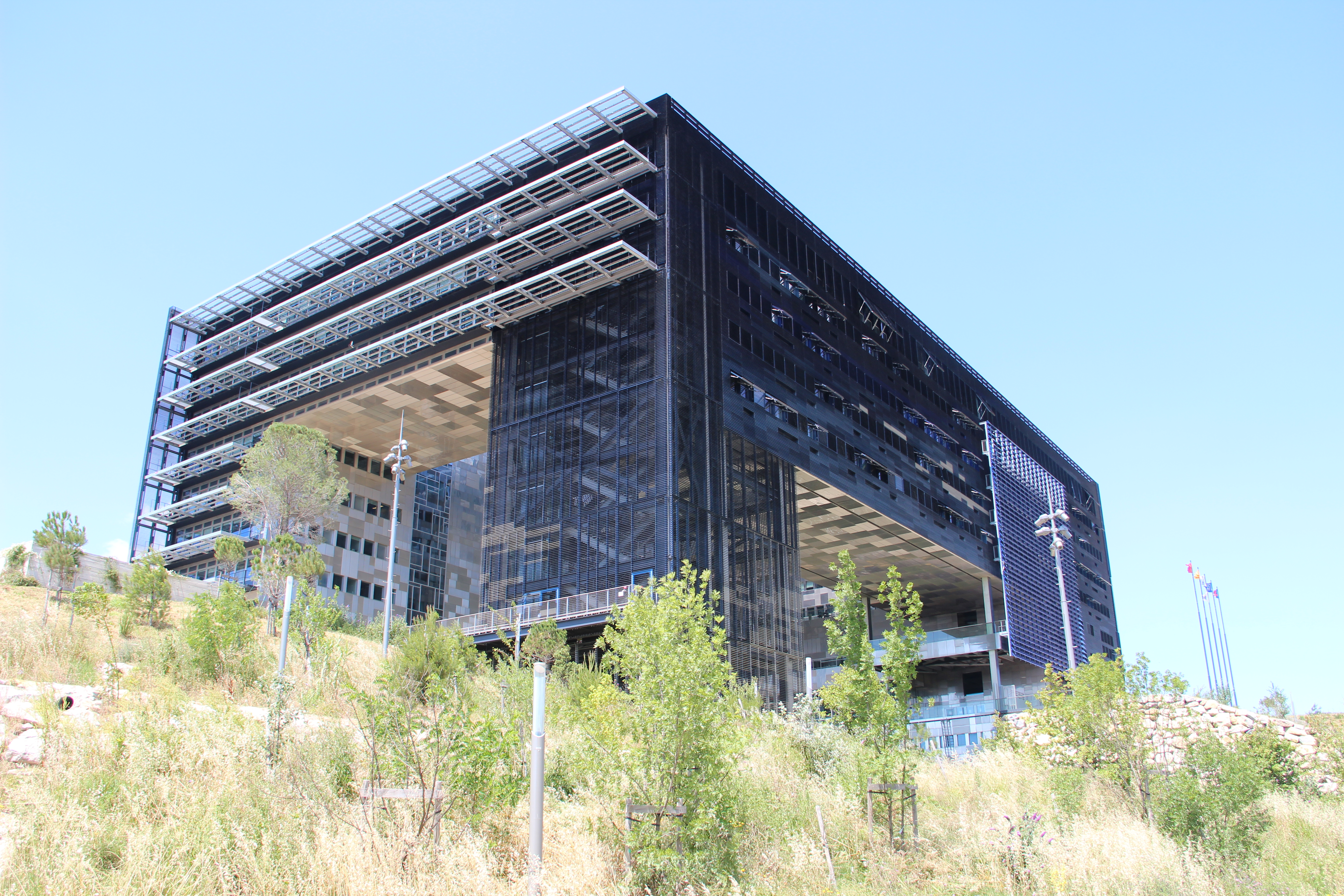
- The Hôtel de Ville in June 2013

General information
- Type: City hall
- Architectural style: Modern style
- Location: Montpellier, France
- Coordinates: 43.5986°N 3.8968°E
- Completed: 2011

Height
- Height: 41 meters (135 ft)

Design and construction
- Architects: Jean Nouvel and François Fontès

The Hôtel de Ville (French pronunciation: [otɛl də vil], City Hall) is a historic building in Montpellier, Hérault, southern France, standing on Place Georges Frêche.

== History ==
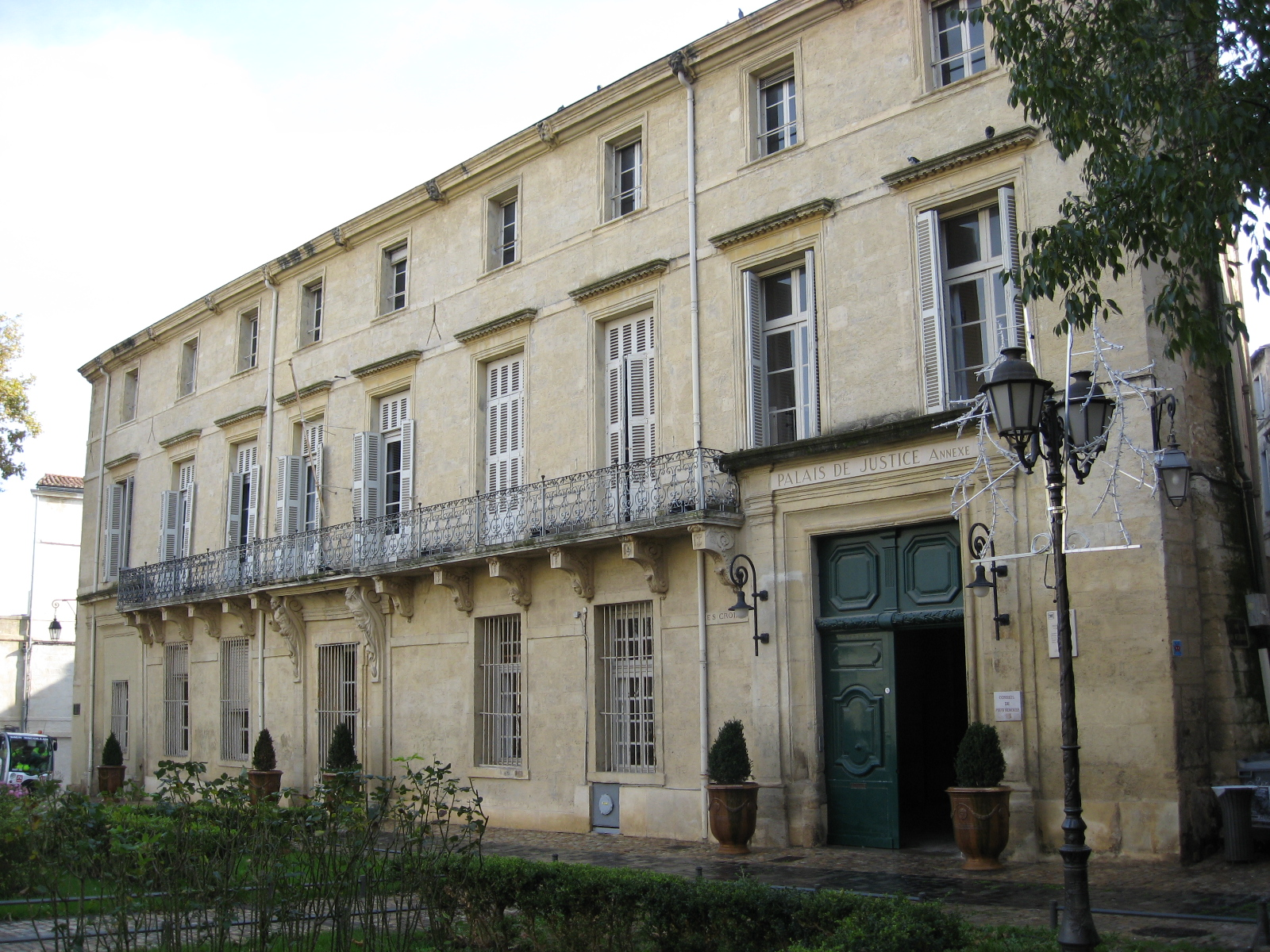
Hôtel de Belleval (the Hôtel de Ville from 1816 to 1975)

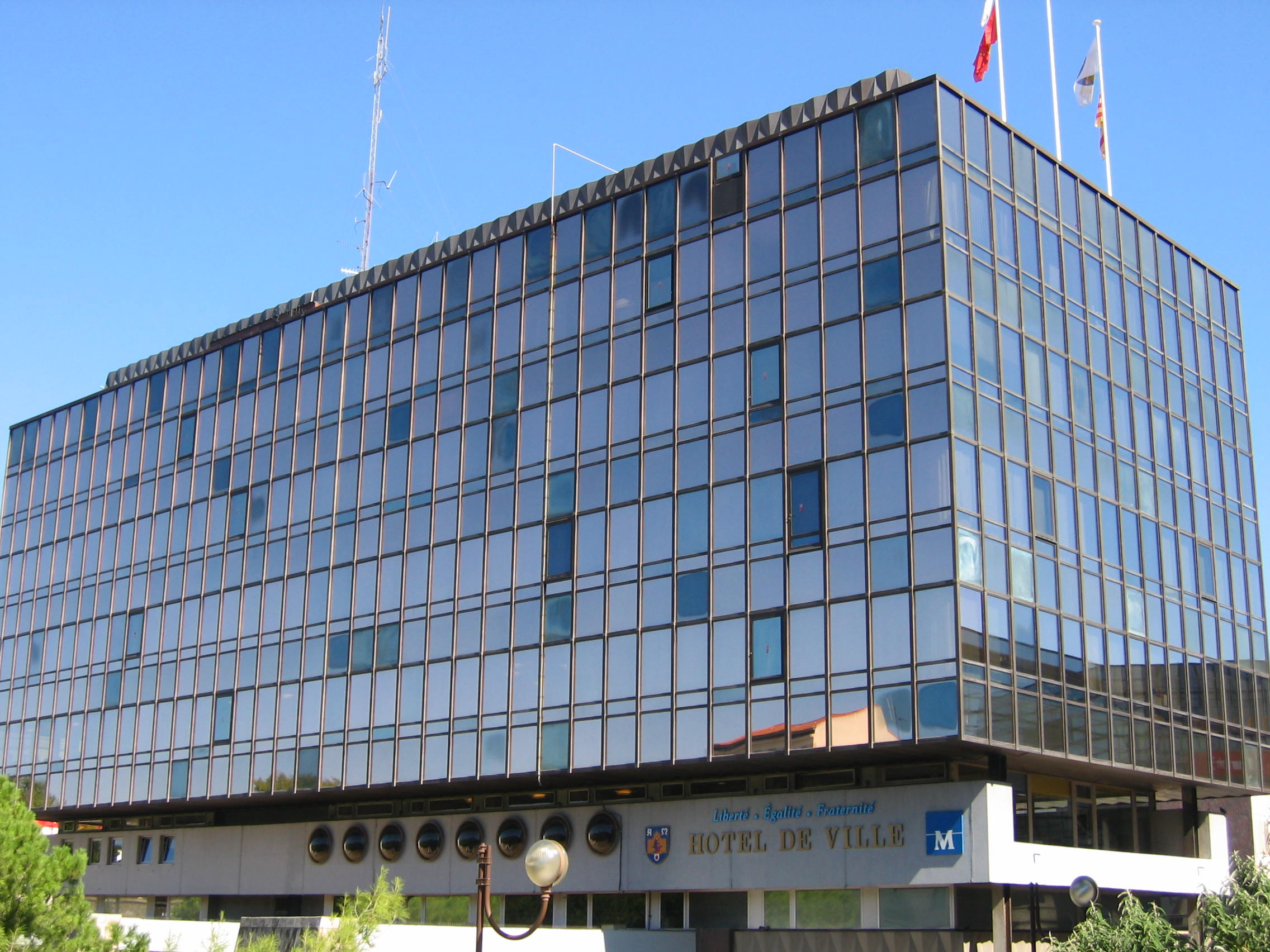
The former Hôtel de Ville (from 1975 to 2011) on Place Francis-Ponge

The city council held its meetings in a building on Place de la Canourgue from 1205, and then in a building on Place Jean Jaurès from 1252. After the French Revolution, the council secured a lease on the Hôtel de Belleval on Place de la Canourgue, which had been designed in the neoclassical style and dated back to the second half of the 17th century. The council acquired the building in 1816, and instigated structural improvements, which involved the installation of 12 internal columns, in 1827. The building was designated a monument historique by the French government in 1950.

In the early 1970s, the city council led by the mayor, François Delmas, decided to commission a modern building. The site they selected was on Place Francis-Ponge. The new building was designed by Jean-Claude Deshons and Philippe Jaulmes in the modern style, clad in glass and was officially opened by the deputy secretary of the Union of Democrats for the Republic, Albin Chalandon, in 1975.

As the responsibilities of the council increased the council took more space in various buildings around the city. In due course, this arrangement was deemed unsatisfactory, and in the early 21st century, the city council, led by the mayor, Georges Frêche, decided to commission a more sustainable building, where all staff could be collocated. The site they selected was in the Port Marianne district. Construction started in October 2007. The new building was designed by Jean Nouvel and François Fontès in the modern style, and built by Fayat Group, Bec Construction and Castel & Fromaget, with a steel frame and blue-tinged glass cladding at a cost of €130 million. It was officially opened by the mayor, Hélène Mandroux, on 12 November 2011.

The design involved an asymmetrical main frontage, which was 50 metres (160 ft) wide and 41 meters (135 ft) high, facing onto a new public space named Place Georges Frêche, in honour of the mayor who initiated the project. The 12-storey building took the form of a hollow cube, perched across a small lake. It featured a large photovoltaic power station on the roof, to provide heat and light throughout the building. Internally, it provided a new council chamber, as well as offices for 4,000 council staff.

A statue by the sculptor, Jean-Loup Bouvier, depicting the flamenco guitarist, Manitas de Plata, playing his guitar, was erected in front of the building in June 2017, and a plaque, intended to commemorate the lives of the 41 mayors, who had served the city since 1790, was unveiled by the mayor, Michaël Delafosse, on 24 November 2021.
