= Allegria (1990 album) =

Live album by Gipsy Kings
- Released: 1990
- Genre: Flamenco

Gipsy Kings chronology
Mosaïque (1989)	Allegria (1990)	Este Mundo (1991)

Allegria is a compilation album by the Gipsy Kings, released in 1990 for US audience. It is a merged album of the original Allegria album from 1982 and Luna de Fuego from 1983. The decision was also made to delete four tracks from the two European recordings, possibly to make the double recording fit onto one CD. The four songs which didn't make the cut were "Djobi Djoba", "Pharaon", "Recuerda", and "Gipsyrock".

Unlike the Gipsy Kings' other U.S. releases, Allegria has the same acoustic style as their first European albums.

== Track listing ==
No.	Title	Length
1.	"Pena Penita"	3:17
2.	"Galaxia" (Instrumental)	3:06
3.	"Solituda"	2:32
4.	"La Dona"	3:31
5.	"Allegria" (Instrumental)	2:44
6.	"Un Amor"	3:50
7.	"Papa, No Pega La Mama"	3:01
8.	"Sueño" (Instrumental)	3:23
9.	"Tristessa"	3:37
10.	"Amor D'un Dia"	4:49
11.	"Luna De Fuego" (Instrumental)	3:33
12.	"Calaverada"	2:43
13.	"Ruptura"	4:14
14.	"Viento Del Arena"	4:55
15.	"Princessa"	3:33
16.	"Olvidado" (Instrumental)	2:43
17.	"Ciento"	3:23
