= Estrellas (album) =

1995 studio album by Gipsy Kings

Studio album by Gipsy Kings
- Released: 1995; March 12, 1996 (US)
- Recorded: at Studio Miraval, Miraval, France.
- Genre: Flamenco, Flamenco Rumba
- Label: Nonesuch Records
- Producer: Claude Martinez, Gérard Prévost

Gipsy Kings chronology
The Best of the Gipsy Kings (1995)	Estrellas (1995)	Compas (1997)

Tierra Gitana artwork

Professional ratings
Review scores
Source	Rating
The Encyclopedia of Popular Music	2/5 stars
Music Week	4/5 stars

Estrellas is the seventh studio album by the Gipsy Kings released in 1995 in Europe and a year later in the United States, under the title Tierra Gitana.

== Overview ==
The album was later released as Tierra Gitana in the United States, albeit with a different song order. The only differences are the replacement of the song "Los Peces en el Rio" for the instrumental song "Forever"; the song "Mujer" is also slightly different. Also, "A Tu Vera" is a different version than the one that appeared on The Best of the Gipsy Kings.

== Track listing ==
European version
No.	Title	Length
1.	"La Rumba de Nicolas"	3:56
2.	"A Ti a Ti"	3:36
3.	"Siempre Acaba Tu Vida"	4:57
4.	"Forever" (Instrumental)	3:53
5.	"Mujer"	4:17
6.	"Campesino"	3:30
7.	"Cataluña" (Instrumental)	3:41
8.	"Igual Se Entonces"	3:59
9.	"Pajarito"	3:06
10.	"Tierra Gitana" (Instrumental)	3:28
11.	"A Tu Vera"	3:12
12.	"Mi Corazon"	4:29
13.	"Estrellas" (Instrumental)	3:32

American version (Tierra Gitana)
No.	Title	Length
1.	"A Ti a Ti"	3:36
2.	"Siempre Acaba Tu Vida"	4:57
3.	"Estrellas" (Instrumental)	3:32
4.	"Mi Corazon"	4:29
5.	"Mujer"	4:17
6.	"Tierra Gitana" (Instrumental)	3:28
7.	"Pajarito"	3:06
8.	"Los Peces en el Rio"	3:17
9.	"Igual Se Entonces"	3:59
10.	"Cataluña" (Instrumental)	3:41
11.	"A Tu Vera"	3:12
12.	"Campesino"	3:30
13.	"La Rumba de Nicolas"	3:56

== Credits ==
- Acoustic Guitar – Georges Reyes
- Drums, Percussion – Negrito Trasante-Crocco
- Guitar – Canut Reyes, Maurice "Diego" Baliardo, Paco Baliardo, Patchai Reyes, Paul Reyes, Tonino Baliardo
- Keyboards – Dominique Droin
- Producer – Claude Martinez
- Producer, Bass – Gérard Prévost
- Vocals – Nicolas Reyes

== Charts ==
=== Weekly charts ===
Weekly chart performance for Estrellas
Chart (1995)	Peak position
Hungarian Albums (MAHASZ)	23
