= Roots (Gipsy Kings album) =

Studio album by Gipsy Kings
- Released: 16 March 2004
- Recorded: 9–26 June 2003, using Le Voyageur Il mobile studio, at Le Mas de Gourgoubès, St.-André-de-Buèges, France.
- Genre: Flamenco
- Length: 57:25
- Label: Nonesuch
- Producer: Gildas Boclé, Craig Street

Gipsy Kings chronology
Somos Gitanos (2001)	Roots (2004)	Pasajero (2006)

Professional ratings
Review scores
Source	Rating
AllMusic	4.5/5 stars
The Encyclopedia of Popular Music	4/5 stars

Roots is the eleventh studio album by the French Rumba Catalana band Gipsy Kings, which was released in 2004 in Europe, USA, and Japan. Both the Europe and US release are identical and have 16 tracks while the Japanese version have two bonus tracks: "Canut Fandango" and "Mi Novia".

== Track listing ==
No.	Title	Length
1.	"Aven, Aven"	4:37
2.	"Legende"	4:12
3.	"Fandango [Patchai]"	1:29
4.	"Bolerias" (Instrumental)	4:36
5.	"Rhythmic"	4:10
6.	"Como Siento Yo"	3:21
7.	"Amigo"	3:45
8.	"Tarantas" (Instrumental)	2:58
9.	"Fandango [Nicolas]"	2:40
10.	"Boogie"	3:23
11.	"Nuages" (Instrumental)	3:08
12.	"Como Ayer"	3:24
13.	"Soledad"	5:57
14.	"Tampa" (Instrumental)	3:07
15.	"Hermanos"	3:05
16.	"Petite Noya" (Live)	3:40

Japanese bonus tracks
No.	Title	Length
17.	"Canut Fandango"	1:58
18.	"Mi Novia"	3:19

== Personnel ==
- Paco Baliardo – guitar (1, 5, 7, 8, 10, 11, 14, 16), hand clapping (4, 16), flamenco guitar (5)
- Diego Baliardo – hand clapping (5), guitar (8, 16), vocals (16)
- Mikail Baliardo – cajon (4)
- Tonino Baliardo – lead guitar (1, 4, 5, 6, 7, 8, 10, 11, 12, 13, 14, 16), guitar (15), hand clapping (16)
- Cyro Baptista – percussion (1, 5, 6, 11, 13, 14, 16), washboard (7, 10), shaker (15)
- Greg Cohen – double bass (1, 2, 4, 5, 6, 7, 8, 10, 11, 12, 13, 14, 15, 16), arco (2)
- Garth Hudson – accordion (2, 16)
- Bachir Mokari – derbouka (15)
- Andre Reyes – guitar (1, 7, 13, 16), vocals (1, 12, 13, 16), hand clapping (4, 5), backing vocals (6, 10)
- François "Canut" Reyes – guitar (1), lead vocal (2, 7, 13)
- Georges "Baule" Reyes –
- Nicholas Reyes – lead vocal (1, 5, 6, 10, 12), hand clapping (4, 5), guitar (5, 6, 9, 12), vocal (9)
- Pablo (Paul) Reyes – guitar (1, 5, 7, 10, 15, 16), hand clapping (5)
- Patchai Reyes – vocals (3, 15, 16), guitar (3, 15)
- Yakouba Sissoko – kora (14)
- Titi – hand clapping (16)
