= Sabor de Gràcia =

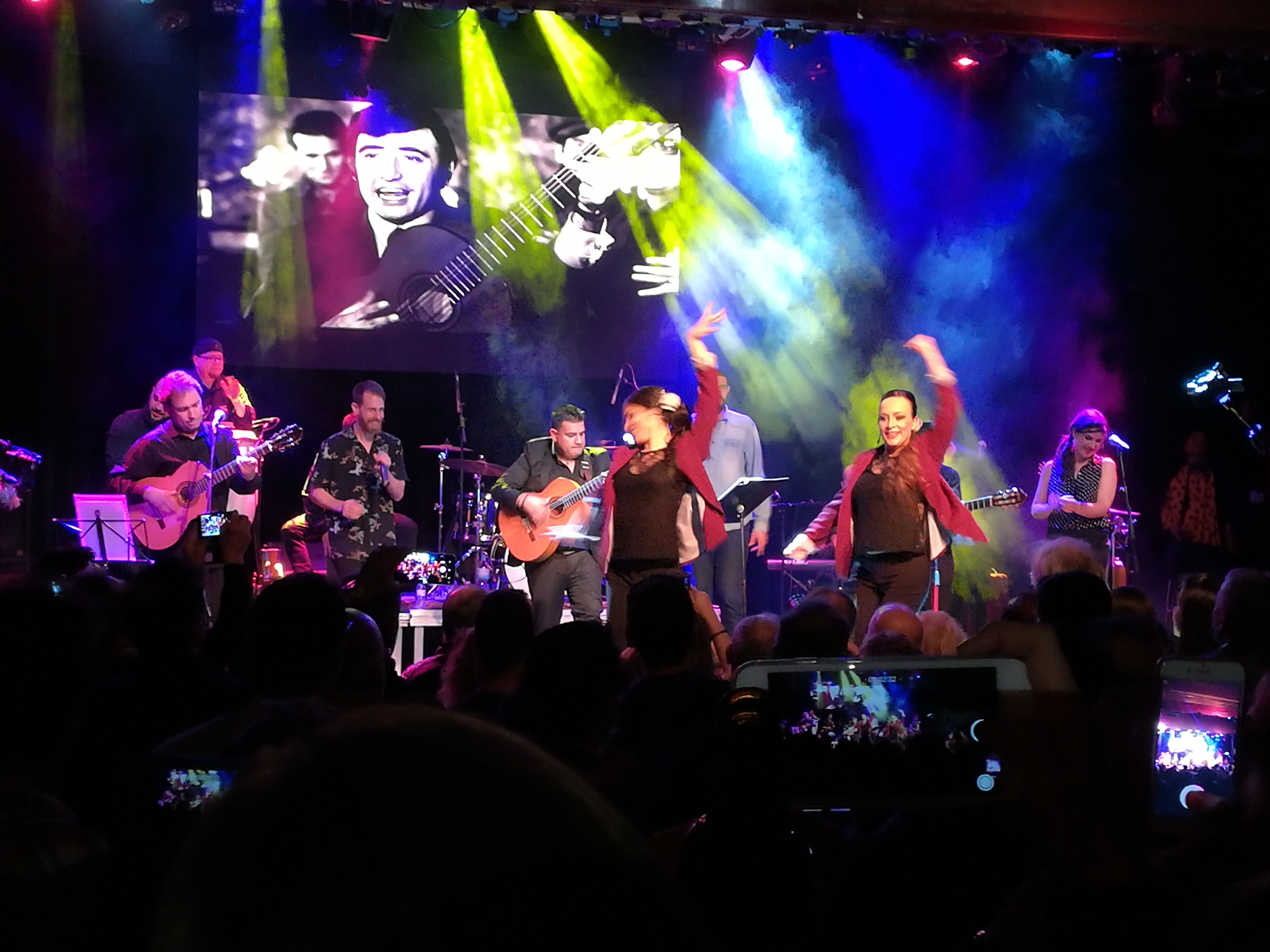
Sabor de gracia in 2018

Sabor de Gràcia (taste or flavour of Gràcia) is a Catalan rumba band from Barcelona, Spain.

The group was created in 1994 under the leadership of Antoni Carbonell, Sicus. They published their first album in 1997. Tots els colors (all the colours) includes both inedit songs and covers of some Catalan classic artists such as Joan Manuel Serrat. In 2015 they published a new album to celebrate 20 years of history: Gitanos Catalans (Catalan Gypsies). They have been involved in some events and projects promoting Catalan independence.

In 2018 they published an album to pay homage to Peret: Sabor a Peret.

Like the Romani people from Northern Catalonia, Sabor de Gràcia sing predominantly in Catalan. Their unique style of rumba adopts some features of pop music and other modern tunes.

They have performed in several countries in Europe and America.
