= Canut Reyes =

French musician (born 1954)

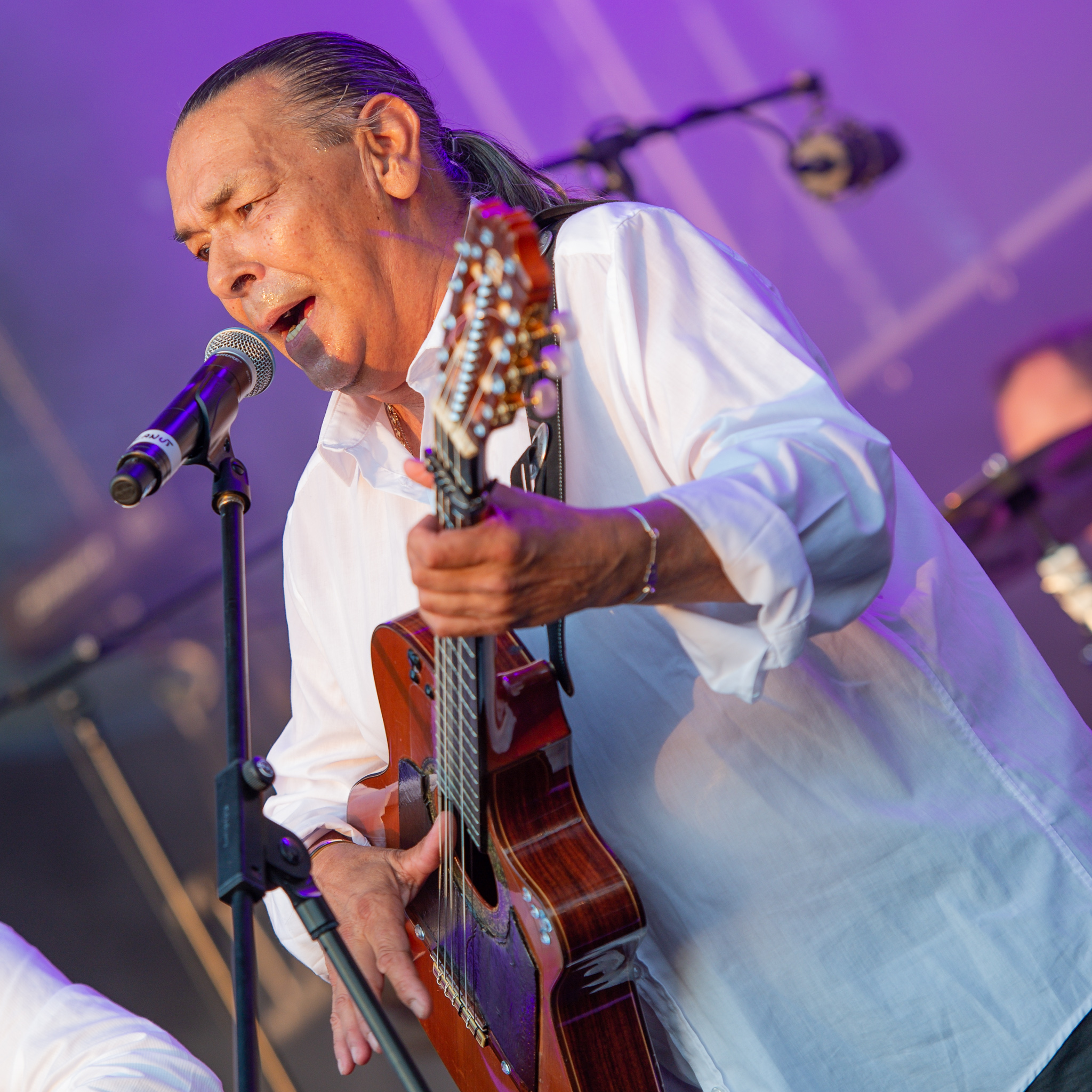
- Reyes in 2018

Background information
- Born: François Reyes; 9 June 1954 (age 72); Strasbourg, France
- Genres: Flamenco; Romani music
- Occupations: Musician; songwriter; painter
- Instruments: Guitar; vocals
- Years active: 1974–present
- Formerly of: Gipsy Kings

François Reyes (born 9 June 1954), better known as Canut Reyes, is a French guitarist, singer, songwriter, and painter of Spanish Gitano descent, best known for being part of the group Gipsy Kings.

== Biography ==
Canut Reyes was born in Strasbourg, the son of flamenco vocalist Jose Reyes (1928–1979) and Clementine Nésanson (died 2005). Canut was part of the musical group his father and brothers started around 1974, called Jose Reyes et Los Reyes. They played their version of flamenco at private parties in the south of France. José Reyes died in 1979, after battling lung cancer.

After their father's death, the brothers joined with their Baliardo cousins, adopting the new name Gipsy Kings, a tribute to their gypsy roots and the surname "Reyes" which means "kings" in Spanish. Gipsy Kings recorded their first two albums, Allegria (1982) and Luna de Fuego (1983). Despite strong support from personalities such as Brigitte Bardot and Francis Lalanne, the group was unable to break through, and Canut and Patchaï left the band.

Reyes continued his musical activities in various other groups, playing mainly at private parties. In 1989, he released his first solo album, Bolero, a tribute to Maurice Ravel.

Gipsy Kings had in the meantime signed a production contract with EMP. After an eponymous album, issued in 1987, they recorded Mosaïque in 1989. Reyes was not involved in these recordings, but he joined the group for the world tour following the release of Mosaïque.

Reyes met brothers Jean and Gildas Boclé in Japan in 2001, which was the beginning of a collaboration that led to the recording of Gitano, Reyes' second solo album, released in 2012.

== Discography ==
=== Solo ===
- Bolero (1989)
- Gitano (2012)

=== José Reyes et Los Reyes ===
- Jose Reyes & Los Reyes (1974)
- Gypsy Poet (1977)
- The Love of One Day (1978)

=== Los Reyes ===
- Festival of Saintes Maries de la Mer (1982)
- Tribute to Jose Reyes (1991)

=== Celtic Tales (Boclé Brothers) ===
- Crossfields (2010)

== See also ==
- New Flamenco
- Flamenco rumba
