= Makeba =

Makeba is an African name.

People with the name include:

- Makeba Alcide (born 1990), Saint Lucian track and field athlete
- Makeba Riddick, American singer-songwriter
- Bongi Makeba (1950–1985), South African singer-songwriter, daughter of Miriam
- Miriam Makeba (1932–2008), South African singer, actor, UN goodwill ambassador, and civil rights activist
