= Antonio Rivas (Colombian footballer) =

Colombian footballer (born 1951)

Personal information
- Date of birth: 4 November 1951 (age 74)
- Position: Goalkeeper

Senior career*
Years	Team	Apps	(Gls)
- Independiente Santa Fe
- * Club domestic league appearances and goals

Antonio Rivas (born 4 November 1951) is a Colombian former footballer who competed in the 1972 Summer Olympics.
