= Compas (album) =

Studio album by Gipsy Kings
- Released: November 6, 1997
- Recorded: at Recall Studio, France; additional recording at Metropolis Studios, London.
- Genre: Flamenco, Rumba, World Music
- Label: Nonesuch
- Producer: Chris Kimsey

Gipsy Kings chronology
Love Songs (1996)	Compas (1997)	¡Volaré! The Very Best of the Gipsy Kings (1999)

Professional ratings
Review scores
Source	Rating
AllMusic	3/5 stars
The Encyclopedia of Popular Music	4/5 stars

Compas is the ninth studio album by rumba band Gipsy Kings. It was released in 1997 in Europe and the US, using a different song order. The European version has one completely new track, "Sueño de Noche", as well as a remixed version of "Ami Wa Wa (Solo Por Ti)".

== Track listing ==
European version
No.	Title	Length
1.	"Ami Wa Wa (Solo Por Ti)"	4:02
2.	"Una Rumba Por Aqui"	4:24
3.	"Mira la Gitana Mora"	6:55
4.	"Recuerdo Apasionado" (Instrumental)	4:04
5.	"La Fiesta Comenza"	3:03
6.	"Sueño de Noche"	5:56
7.	"Que Si, Que No (Funiculi Funiculi)"	3:19
8.	"Canto a Brazil"	4:15
9.	"Obsesion de Amor" (Instrumental)	5:09
10.	"Mi Niño"	3:16
11.	"Di Me"	5:40
12.	"Lo Mal y Lo Bien"	3:03
13.	"Amor Gitano"	7:28
14.	"Salsa de Noche" (Instrumental)	3:29
15.	"Ami Wa Wa (Solo Por Ti) [Remix]"	3:37

American version
No.	Title	Length
1.	"Ami Wa Wa (Solo Por Ti)"	4:02
2.	"Que Si, Que No (Funiculi Funiculi)"	3:19
3.	"Una Rumba Por Aqui"	4:24
4.	"Recuerdo Apasionado" (Instrumental)	4:04
5.	"Mira la Itana Mora"	6:55
6.	"La Fiesta Comenza"	3:03
7.	"Canto a Brazil"	4:15
8.	"Salsa de Noche" (Instrumental)	3:29
9.	"Mi Niño"	3:16
10.	"Di Me"	5:40
11.	"Obsesion de Amor" (Instrumental)	5:09
12.	"Lo Mal y Lo Bien"	3:03
13.	"Amor Gitano"	7:28

== Credits ==
- Arranged by – Gipsy Kings, Jon Carin
- Mastered by – Bob Ludwig
- Mixed By, Producer – Chris Kimsey
- Photography – Peter Knaup

== Personnel ==
(using the American track list)

- Abud Abdel Al - violin (1, 2, 4, 5)
- Paco Baliardo - compas (flamenco) guitar (4, 8)
- Tonino Baliardo - solo guitar (3, 4, 5, 7, 8, 9, 11, 12, 13), compas (flamenco) guitar (4, 8, 11)
- Gipsy Kings, unspecified - guitar (3, 5, 6, 7, 9)
- Jon Carin - piano accordion (1, 2, 7), Kurzweil (1, 7, 10), strings (2, 5, 13), bass guitar (3), sample claps (3), tambourine (3), castanets (3), djembe harp (4), loops (4, 5), atmosphere (5), Egyptian flute (5), keyboards (6), percussion (7, 9, 10), cymbal (8), finger snaps (8), steel guido (8), electric guitar (9), piano (9, 11), autoharp (10), acoustic guitar (10), drum programming (11), programmed percussion (12)
- Shawn Farrenden - didgeridoo (1)
- Manu Katché - drums (8, 11)
- Andres Levin—additional keyboards (7), samples (7)
- Pino Palladino, bass (1, 7), bass guitar (2, 4, 5, 10, 11, 12), electric guitar (9), acoustic guitar (10)
- Hossam Ramzy - Egyptian percussion (1, 3, 4, 5, 7, 9, 10, 12), shaker (8)
- Andre Reyes – lead vocals (1, 7), backing vocals (1), harmony vocals (2, 3, 5, 6, 7, 10, 12), hand clapping (2, 4, 12), guitar (10, 12)
- François "Canut" Reyes - backing vocals (1), lead vocals (2, 13), guitar (2, 13)
- Georges "Baule" Reyes - backing vocals (1), guitar (12)
- Nicholas Reyes – lead vocals (1, 3, 5, 6, 10, 12), backing vocals (1), hand clapping (2, 3, 4, 12); percussion (6), guitar (10), harmony vocals (12)
- Patchai Reyes - backing vocals (1), hand clapping (3), lead vocals (9), harmony vocals (9)
- Paul Reyes – backing vocals (1)
- Eddie Thornton - trumpet (3, 7, 9)
- Brian Edwards - saxophone (3, 7, 9, 11)
- Trevor Edwards - trombone (3, 7, 9)
- Nigel Shaw - flute (5, 13), whistle (6. 13)
- Naná Vasconcelos - percussion (7)

== Charts ==
=== Weekly charts ===
Weekly chart performance for Compas
Chart (1997)	Peak position
Hungarian Albums (MAHASZ)	36

== Certifications and sales ==
Region	Certification	Certified units/sales
United States	—	221,000
Summaries
Worldwide	—	770,000
