= Savor Flamenco =

Studio album by Gipsy Kings
- Released: September 10, 2013
- Genre: Rumba catalana, World Music
- Length: 38:52
- Label: Knitting Factory KFR1128-5
- Producer: Tonino Baliardo, Nicolás Reyes

Gipsy Kings chronology
Pasajero (2006)	Savor Flamenco (2013)

Professional ratings
Review scores
Source	Rating
AllMusic	3.5/5 stars

Savor Flamenco (a play on Sabor Flamenco, "Flamenco Flavor") is the thirteenth studio album by the rumba catalana group Gipsy Kings. It was released on September 10, 2013 by Knitting Factory. The album was one of two recipients of the 2014 Grammy Award for Best World Music Album.

== Track listing ==
No.	Title	Length
1.	"Caramelo"	3:32
2.	"Bye Bye (Ella Me Dice Vay)"	3:33
3.	"Como L'agua"	3:13
4.	"Tiempo Del Sol"	3:38
5.	"Me Voy"	3:48
6.	"Fairies Melody"	3:51
7.	"Samba Samba"	3:11
8.	"Corazón"	3:29
9.	"Savor Flamenco (Tango Flamenco)"	3:40
10.	"Sueño"	3:40
11.	"Habla Contingo"	3:13
