= Este Mundo =

Studio album by Gipsy Kings
- Released: 19 July 1991
- Recorded: February – March 1991
- Genres: Flamenco; world
- Length: 45:05
- Label: Elektra
- Producer: Nick Patrick

Gipsy Kings chronology
Allegria (1990)	Este Mundo (1991)	Live (1992)

Professional ratings
Review scores
Source	Rating
AllMusic	3/5 stars
The Rolling Stone Album Guide	2/5 stars

Este Mundo is the fifth studio album by the Gipsy Kings, released in July 1991 in US and Europe; both versions are identical. "No Volveré" was covered by Tarkan as "Vazgeçemem" ("I Can't Give Up" in Turkish) on his debut album Yine Sensiz (Without You Again in Turkish) in 1992.

== Track listing ==
All songs written by the Gipsy Kings

No.	Title	Length
1.	"Baila Me"	3:47
2.	"Sin Ella"	4:00
3.	"Habla Me"	4:06
4.	"Lagrimas" (Instrumental)	2:58
5.	"Oy"	4:51
6.	"Mi Vida"	3:52
7.	"El Mauro"	4:39
8.	"No Volveré"	3:52
9.	"Furia" (Instrumental)	2:40
10.	"Oh Mai"	3:14
11.	"Ternuras" (Instrumental)	3:26
12.	"Este Mundo"	4:12
Total length:		45:37

== Personnel ==
Personnel taken from Este Mundo liner notes.

Gipsy Kings

- Nicolas Reyes – lead vocals, guitar
- Tonino Baliardo – solo guitar
- André Reyes – guitar, background vocals
- Canut Reyes – guitar, background vocals
- Paco Baliardo – guitar
- Diego Baliardo – guitar

== Charts ==
Chart performance for Este Mundo
Chart (1991)	Peak position
Australian Albums (ARIA)	96
Austrian Albums (Ö3 Austria)	4
Dutch Albums (Album Top 100)	1
German Albums (Offizielle Top 100)	3
Swedish Albums (Sverigetopplistan)	20
Swiss Albums (Schweizer Hitparade)	1
UK Albums (Official Charts)	19
US Billboard 200	120
US Top Latin Albums (Billboard)	13
US World Albums (Billboard)	2

== Certifications and sales ==
Certifications and sales for Este Mundo
Region	Certification	Certified units/sales
Austria (IFPI Austria)	Platinum	50,000^{*}
France (SNEP)	Gold	100,000^{*}
Germany (BVMI)	Platinum	500,000^{^}
Netherlands (NVPI)	Gold	50,000^{^}
Spain (Promusicae)	Gold	50,000^{^}
Switzerland (IFPI Switzerland)	Platinum	50,000^{^}
United Kingdom (BPI)	Silver	60,000^{^}
United States	—	325,000
^{*} Sales figures based on certification alone.^{^} Shipments figures based on certification alone.
