= Antonio Rivas (musician) =

Colombian accordion player

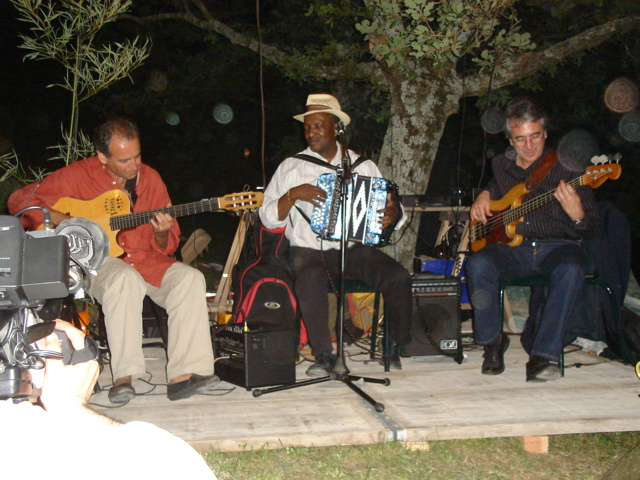
- Antonio Rivas in May 2007

Background information
- Also known as: El Jardinero Colombiano
- Born: Antonio Rivas Padilla; 28 April; Istmina, Colombia
- Genres: Vallenato and Cumbia
- Occupations: Singer-songwriter, Accordionist, arranger, bandleader, Mathematics professor, High energy physicien
- Instruments: Vocals, accordion
- Labels: Robi Droli, Utrecht, BMG
- Website: antonio.rivas.free.fr

Antonio Rivas Padilla is a Colombian accordion player. He has got to know many of the great masters of the Vallenato's folklore such as Alejo Durán, Abel Antonio Villa, Mariano Perez, Pablo Garcia, Emiliano Zuleta, Alfredo Gutiérrez, Ismael Rudas, Pablo Lopez and many others.

== Biography ==
He was born in Istimina, Colombia, to Adriano Rivas and Sabina Padilla. Completely self-taught, he took up the diatonic accordion at the age of fifteen.

He earned a master's degree in mathematics in Colombia, then moved to France, where he completed a PhD in high-energy physics and a master's degree in computer science. In 1984, he created the group Antonio y sus Vallenatos in Montpellier. In 1987, with Nemesio Jimenes ('EI Condor'), he founded the group Novedad Vallenata in Paris.

In Europe, Antonio Rivas takes part in most of the international events involving the diatonic accordion. In 1995 he appeared at WOMEX, the World Music Expo in Brussels, and at the town hall of Paris for the 50th anniversary of UNESCO.

== Discography ==
- 1991 : La Perla de Arseguel / Music and Words / MWCD 3002 – CD-LP-MC
- 1995 : El Jardinero Colombiano / Silex – Audivis / B 6803 – CD
- 1997 : Despierta Corazon / Lilopé / Milan – CD
- 2011 : Vaya Con Dios / Arivas Productions / ARP CD 001

=== Collaborations ===
- 2003 : Chants de Noël Latinoamèricans (With the band Noel Latino)
- 2005 : Clapotis (With the band Au Fil De L'aire)
- 2008 : Pasajero (With the band Gipsy Kings)

== Films and documentaries ==
- 1995: Mother-of-pearl confidences

Documentary broadcast in France by FR 3 (26 minutes)

1997: "Passat" Emission Dutch International TV

1999: NET Television Greek International TV

- 1999 : Participation to the Music of the Film "Chili con carne", from Thomas Gilou with Antoine de Caunes, Valentina Vargas and Gilbert Melki
