= Love and Liberté =

Studio album by Gipsy Kings
- Released: 1993
- Recorded: January – June 1993
- Genre: Flamenco, world music
- Label: Elektra Musician, Columbia Records
- Producer: Gerard Prevost, Claude Martinez

Gipsy Kings chronology
Live (1992)	Love and Liberté (1993)	Greatest Hits (1994)

Professional ratings
Review scores
Source	Rating
AllMusic	3/5 stars
The Encyclopedia of Popular Music	2/5 stars

Love and Liberté is the sixth studio album by Gipsy Kings released in 1993. The album was released in different US and European versions. Apart from the song order, the difference is the exclusive track "La Quiero" on the European release and versions of songs "Escucha Me" and "Campaña".

== Track listing ==
European version
No.	Title	Length
1.	"Pedir a Tu Corazon"	4:39
2.	"Escucha Me"	4:39
3.	"Ritmo de la Noche" (Instrumental)	3:30
4.	"Montaña"	5:24
5.	"Navidad"	3:29
6.	"Queda Te Aqui"	4:44
7.	"Michaël" (Instrumental)	4:05
8.	"Madre Mia"	3:53
9.	"No Viviré"	4:10
10.	"Guitarra Negra" (Instrumental)	3:42
11.	"Campaña"	4:12
12.	"Love and Liberté" (Instrumental)	3:55
13.	"La Quiero"	3:45

American version
No.	Title	Length
1.	"No Viviré"	4:10
2.	"Campaña"	4:12
3.	"Escucha Me"	4:05
4.	"Ritmo de la Noche" (Instrumental)	3:30
5.	"Madre Mia"	3:53
6.	"Pedir a Tu Corazon"	4:39
7.	"Michaël" (Instrumental)	4:05
8.	"Queda Te Aqui"	4:44
9.	"Guitarra Negra" (Instrumental)	3:42
10.	"Navidad"	3:29
11.	"Montaña"	5:24
12.	"Love and Liberté" (Instrumental)	3:55

== Certifications ==
Region	Certification	Certified units/sales
United States	—	305,000

== See also ==
- List of Billboard Latin Pop Albums number ones from the 1990s
