= Djobi Djoba =

"Djobi, Djoba"

Single by Gipsy Kings

from the album Gipsy Kings
- Released: 1987
- Genre: Catalan rumba, flamenco
- Length: 3:27
- Songwriters: Gipsy Kings, Los Reyes

Gipsy Kings singles chronology
"Djobi, Djoba" (1987)	"Bamboléo" (1987)

"Djobi, Djoba" is a hit song by the Gipsy Kings, a French-Calé rumba flamenca band. It was initially released in 1982 as an acoustic version on their debut album Allegria. In 1987, the song was re-recorded and released as a single. This version is from their self-titled third album. Along with other hits from the same album such as "Bamboléo" and "Un Amor", "Djobi Djoba" helped rocket the Gipsy Kings to European popularity, before they gained popularity in America in 1989.

The song is very similar to an earlier song by El Príncipe Gitano titled "Obí obá".

== Charts ==
Chart performance for "Djobi Djoba"
Chart (1987–1988)	Peak position
France (SNEP)	15
Netherlands (Dutch Top 40)	12
Netherlands (Single Top 100)	34
