= Bamboléo =

Single by Gipsy Kings

from the album Gipsy Kings
- Language: Spanish
- Released: 12 July 1987 (US); 31 March 1988 (UK/Hispanic)
- Recorded: 1987
- Genre: Rumba flamenca
- Length: 3:25
- Label: Elektra
- Songwriters: Tonino Baliardo; Chico Bouchikhi; Nicolas Reyes; Simón Díaz; André Filho

Gipsy Kings singles chronology
"Djobi Djoba" (1987)	"Bamboléo" (1987)

Music video
- "Bamboléo" on YouTube

"Bamboléo" is a 1987 Spanish language song by Gitano-French band Gipsy Kings, from their eponymous album. The song was written/adapted by band members Tonino Baliardo, Chico Bouchikhi (J. Bouchikhi), Nicolas Reyes and Venezuelan composer Simón Díaz & Brazilian composer André Filho. It was arranged by Dominique Perrier.

The well known song has been a worldwide hit for the Gipsy Kings and has since been covered by many artists, both in Spanish and in other languages.

== Origin ==
The song is a loose cover and an amalgam (combination) of two older songs by different authors, Caballo Viejo and Bamboleô.

1980 Venezuelan folk song "Caballo Viejo" by Simón Díaz. is used as verse part of Gipsy Kings' song. However, original lyrics are heavily changed (shortened, with addition of completely new verses that completely changed the theme/meaning of the original song), so in this part it is a very loose cover.

The refrain/chorus is based on Bamboleô by André Filho, recorded by Carmen Miranda in 1931.

The word bamboleo means "wobble", "sway" or "dangle" in Spanish. The song's refrain, "bamboleo, bambolea, porque mi vida yo la prefier vivir así", translates to: "Swaying, swaying, because I prefer to live my life this way."

Julio Iglesias performed Gipsy Kings' amalgam as "Caballo Viejo (Bamboleo)", Celia Cruz as "Bamboleo", and many more. Umboza's song "Sunshine", their biggest hit in the UK, is based on a sample of "Bamboléo". In 2006 the Tony Evans Dancebeat Studio Band recorded the samba version for the album Latin Heat 2 - Dancebeat 4 (Tema International Ltd).

The Gipsy Kings included the song again on their album Greatest Hits as track 3. The final track on the same album (track 18) also uses the song in a medley of hits as "Bamboléo – Volare – Djobi Djoba – Pida Me La – Baila Me".

== Track listing ==
1987

- A-side: "Bamboléo" – 3:28
- B-side: "Quiero Saber" – 4:09

1988 12" UK version

- A-side: "Bamboléo"
- B-side: "Bamboléo" (single version) – 3:25 / "Quiero Saber" – 4:10

1988 US version

- A-side: "Bamboléo" – 3:28
- B-side: "Bamboléo" (LP version) – 3:28

1988 long 12" version

- A-side: "Bamboléo" (Latin single) – 3:45)
- B-side: "Bamboléo" (Latin extended version) – 7:17

== Charts ==
Chart performance for "Bamboléo"
Chart (1987–1989)	Peak position
Australia (ARIA)	19
Austria (Ö3 Austria Top 40)	12
Belgium (Ultratop 50 Flanders)	23
France (SNEP)	7
Germany (GfK)	18
Netherlands (Dutch Top 40)	9
Netherlands (Single Top 100)	5
US Hot Latin Songs (Billboard)	6

UK: 87, in July 1989 (sometimes wrongly referred to as "Bambolero")

== Certifications ==
Certifications for "Bamboléo"
Region	Certification	Certified units/sales
Spain (Promusicae)	Gold	30,000^{‡}
United Kingdom (BPI) Sales since 2004	Gold	400,000^{‡}
^{‡} Sales+streaming figures based on certification alone.
