= Live (Gipsy Kings album) =

Live album by Gipsy Kings
- Released: 1992
- Recorded: During the Gipsy Kings "ESTE MUNDO" tour, Fall 1991.
- Genre: Flamenco
- Length: 1:10:56
- Label: Elektra
- Producer: Claude Martinez, Gerard Prevost

Gipsy Kings chronology
Este Mundo (1991)	Live (1992)	Love and Liberté (1993)

Professional ratings
Review scores
Source	Rating
AllMusic	4.5/5 stars

Live is the first live album by the Gipsy Kings, released in 1992 in Europe and the US. Both versions of the release are identical. Apart from "Intro", newly released on this album are the songs "Odeon" and "Fandango".

As of 2007, the album has sold 247,000 copies in the US.

== Track listing ==
No.	Title	Length
1.	"Intro" (Instrumental)	1:40
2.	"Allegria"	3:00
3.	"La Dona"	4:38
4.	"El Mauro"	5:05
5.	"Bem, Bem, Maria"	5:00
6.	"Trista Pena"	5:38
7.	"Odeon" (Instrumental)	3:25
8.	"Sin Ella"	4:36
9.	"Quiero Saber"	4:40
10.	"La Quiero"	4:20
11.	"Habla Me"	5:42
12.	"Galaxia" (Instrumental)	2:35
13.	"Fandango"	7:00
14.	"Tu Quieres Volver"	4:22
15.	"Oh Maï"	4:05
16.	"Djobi, Djoba"	3:36
17.	"Bamboleo"	5:10

== Personnel ==
Gipsy Kings

- Nicolas Reyes - lead vocals, acoustic guitar
- Canut Reyes - backing vocals, acoustic guitar
- Andre Reyes - backing vocals, acoustic guitar
- Diego Baliardo - acoustic guitar
- Paco Baliardo - acoustic guitar
- Tonino Baliardo - soloist acoustic guitar

Supporting Musicians

- Gerard Prevost - bass guitar
- Negrito Trasante-Grocco - drums
- Dominique Droin - keyboards
- Charles Benarrock - percussion
