= Gipsy Kings (album) =

Studio album by Gipsy Kings
- Released: August 21, 1987
- Recorded: 1986–87
- Genre: Rumba Catalana, flamenco
- Length: 43:45
- Language: Spanish
- Label: Elektra Records

Gipsy Kings chronology
Luna de Fuego (1983)	Gipsy Kings (1987)	Mosaïque (1989)

Professional ratings
Review scores
Source	Rating
AllMusic	5/5 stars
The Encyclopedia of Popular Music	3/5 stars
Number One	4/5 stars

Gipsy Kings is the third album by the French Rumba Catalana band Gipsy Kings, which was released in 1987. The US and European versions of this album are identical except in some cases the song order may differ. The Japanese version released in 1995 includes an alternate version of "Vamos a Bailar". The song "Inspiration" from this album famously appeared in the season five episode of Miami Vice, "World of Trouble", in June 1988.

The album was their first to reach a worldwide audience, going gold across France, the UK, the US and other countries. In 1988, Gipsy Kings was released in the US and it spent 40 weeks on the Billboard 200, one of very few Spanish language albums to do so.

== Track listing ==
No.	Title	Writer(s)	Length
1.	"Bamboléo"	T. Baliardo, J. Bouchikhi, N. Reyes, S. Díaz	3:25
2.	"Tú Quieres Volver"	Gipsy Kings	3:15
3.	"Moorea" (Instrumental)	Gipsy Kings	4:05
4.	"Bem, Bem, María"	Gipsy Kings	3:03
5.	"Un Amor"	Gipsy Kings, Los Reyes	3:40
6.	"Inspiration" (Instrumental)	Gipsy Kings	3:28
7.	"A Mi Manera (Comme D'Habitude)" (cover of "My Way")	G. Thibault, C. Francois, J. Revaux	3:52
8.	"Djobi Djoba"	Gipsy Kings, Los Reyes	3:27
9.	"Faena" (Instrumental)	T. Baliardo, J. Bouchikhi, N. Reyes	3:45
10.	"Quiero Saber"	Gipsy Kings	4:10
11.	"Amor, Amor"	Gipsy Kings	3:13
12.	"Duende" (Instrumental)	Gipsy Kings	4:22

Japanese Bonus Tracks

No.	Title	Length
13.	"Vamos A Bailar"	3:59

== Singles ==
- Bamboléo (31 March 1988)
- Djobi Djoba (25 October 1988)
- Bem, Bem, Maria (25 February 1989)
- Un Amor (29 July 1989)
- Tu Quieres Volver (26 September 1989)
- A Mi Manera (December 1989)

== Personnel ==
Gipsy Kings

- Nicolas Reyes — lead vocals, rhythm guitar
- Tonino Baliardo — lead and rhythm guitars
- André Reyes — rhythm guitar, backing vocals
- Jacques "Max" Baliardo — rhythm guitar
- Jahloul "Chico" Bouchikhi — rhythm guitar, handclaps
- Maurice "Diego" Baliardo — rhythm guitar, handclaps
- Paul "Pablo" Reyes — rhythm guitar

Additional Personnel

- Dominique Perrier — synthesizer; arrangements (tracks 1, 3, 5, 12)
- Gerard Prévost — bass, synthesizer; arrangements (tracks 2, 4, 6–9, 10, 11)
- Claude Salmieri — drums
- Marc Chantereau — percussion

== Charts and certifications ==
=== Chart performance ===
==== Weekly charts ====
Chart (1987–1989)	Peak position
Australian ARIA Albums Chart	2
Austrian Albums Chart	20
Dutch Albums Chart	22
Norwegian Albums Chart	14
New Zealand Singles Chart	20
Swedish Albums Chart	23
Swiss Albums Chart	23

==== Year-End charts ====
Chart (1989)	Peak position
Australian ARIA Albums Chart	21

=== Sales and certifications ===
Region	Certification	Certified units/sales
Australia (ARIA)	2× Platinum	140,000^{^}
Canada (Music Canada)	2× Platinum	200,000^{^}
France (SNEP)	Platinum	300,000^{*}
Japan (RIAJ)	Gold	100,000^{^}
Portugal (AFP)	Gold	20,000^{^}
Switzerland (IFPI Switzerland)	Gold	25,000^{^}
United Kingdom (BPI)	Gold	100,000^{^}
United States (RIAA)	Platinum	1,000,000^{^}
^{*} Sales figures based on certification alone.^{^} Shipments figures based on certification alone.

== See also ==
- List of best-selling Latin albums
