= Mosaïque =

Studio album by Gipsy Kings
- Released: 28 April 1989
- Recorded: 1988
- Genre: Flamenco
- Length: 49:32
- Label: Columbia, Elektra
- Producer: Claude Martinez

Gipsy Kings chronology
Gipsy Kings (1988)	Mosaïque (1989)	Allegria (US Version) (1990)

Professional ratings
Review scores
Source	Rating
Allmusic	4.5/5 stars
The Encyclopedia of Popular Music	3/5 stars

Mosaïque is the fourth studio album by the Gipsy Kings, released in 1989 in Europe and Canada. The main difference between the two versions is the replacement of the instrumental "Bossamba" on the European release with "Niña morena" on the North American release. The track order also differs between the two versions, and they contain different recordings of the songs "Caminando por la calle", "Trista pena", and "Vamos a bailar".

"Viento del arena" is a studio album release from the song's appearance in Luna de Fuego.

== European track listing ==
No.	Title	Length
1.	"Caminando por la calle"	4:17
2.	"Viento del arena" (Studio Version)	5:27
3.	"Mosaïque" (Instrumental)	3:40
4.	"Camino"	5:03
5.	"Passion" (Instrumental)	3:01
6.	"Soy"	3:10
7.	"Volare"	3:38
8.	"Trista pena"	4:29
9.	"Liberté" (Instrumental)	4:01
10.	"Serana"	4:19
11.	"Bossamba" (Instrumental)	3:18
12.	"Vamos a bailar" (Live)	5:09

== North American track listing ==
No.	Title	Length
1.	"Caminando por la calle"	4:17
2.	"Viento del arena" (Studio Version)	5:27
3.	"El camino"	5:03
4.	"Mosaïque" (Instrumental)	3:40
5.	"Serana"	4:19
6.	"Liberté" (Instrumental)	4:01
7.	"Volare"	3:38
8.	"Trista pena"	4:29
9.	"Niña morena"	3:51
10.	"Passion" (Instrumental)	3:01
11.	"Soy"	3:10
12.	"Vamos a bailar" (Live)	5:09

== Certifications ==
Region	Certification	Certified units/sales
Germany (BVMI)	Gold	250,000^{^}
France (SNEP)	2× Gold	200,000^{*}
Switzerland (IFPI Switzerland)	Gold	25,000^{^}
United Kingdom (BPI)	Gold	100,000^{^}
United States (RIAA)	Gold	500,000^{^}
^{*} Sales figures based on certification alone.^{^} Shipments figures based on certification alone.
