= Luna de Fuego =

Studio album by Gipsy Kings
- Released: 22 April 1983
- Recorded: 1982
- Genre: Flamenco
- Length: 35:45
- Label: Columbia Records 466763 2
- Producer: Jacqueline Tarta

Gipsy Kings chronology
Allegria (1982)	Luna de Fuego (1983)	Gipsy Kings (1987)

Singles from Luna de Fuego
- 1. "Princessa" Released: 21 March 1983; 2. "Viento Del Arena" Released: 13 July 1983

Professional ratings
Review scores
Source	Rating
AllMusic	3/5 stars
The Encyclopedia of Popular Music	3/5 stars

Luna de Fuego is the second studio album by the Gipsy Kings, released in 1983 in Europe.

== Background ==
Just like Allegria, Luna de Fuego is denoted to be more traditional than their next albums with only acoustic guitars, voices, and hand claps. In 1990, the album was merged with Allegria while omitting certain tracks for a re-release to a United States audience under Allegria (US Version). Luna de Fuego includes "Gipsyrock", which was never released in the US.

== Reception ==
A reviewer of AllMusic stated "This French import is their first album from 1983, and it is a much more traditional affair, with only acoustic guitars, voices, and hand claps. It shows that artistically the sound did not need to be beefed up; the music is still wonderful. How can an array of seven guitars and full-throated passion not be wonderful?"

== Track listing ==
All tracks are written by Gipsy Kings, except for track 7 written by Gipsy Kings and Los Reyes.

No.	Title	Length
1.	"Amor d'un Dia"	4:46
2.	"Luna De Fuego" (Instrumental)	3:27
3.	"Calaverada"	2:39
4.	"Galaxia" (Instrumental)	2:53
5.	"Ruptura"	4:26
6.	"Gipsyrock" (Instrumental)	3:54
7.	"Viento Del Arena"	4:47
8.	"Princessa"	3:22
9.	"Olvidado" (Instrumental)	2:31
10.	"Ciento"	3:19
Total length:		35:45

== Credits ==
- Pierre Braner – Engineer
- Gipsy Kings – Composer, Primary Artist
- Los Reyes – Composer

== Covers ==
Song of Viento Del Arena was covered by Volkan Konak, Turkish folk singer, as ″Lilalı Kız″ (″Girl with lilac″ in Turkish) in his album ″Gelir misin Benimle″ (″Do you come with me″ in Turkish), released in 1994. For his video clip of ″Lilalı Kız″:
