= Allegria =

Studio album by Gipsy Kings
- Released: August 6, 1982
- Recorded: 1981–82
- Genre: Flamenco
- Label: Philips Records
- Producer: Sara Music

Gipsy Kings chronology
Allegria (1982)	Luna de Fuego (1983)

Singles from Allegria
- 1. "Tristessa" Released: 31 October 1982; 2. "Un Amor" Released: 3 March 1983

Professional ratings
Review scores
Source	Rating
The Encyclopedia of Popular Music	3/5 stars

Allegria (Italian; "joy") is the debut studio album by the Gipsy Kings, released in 1982 in Europe.

== Overview ==
This album and its successor, Luna de Fuego, are very different from their later albums. They are both "unplugged" and traditional, using solely guitars, voices, and hand claps. The album includes two songs never released on a U.S. album ("Pharaon" and "Recuerda") and the original acoustic version of "Djobi Djoba".

In 1990, the album was merged with Luna de Fuego, while omitting certain tracks for a re-release to a US audience as Allegria (US Version).

== Track listing ==
No.	Title	Length
1.	"Pena Penita"	3:00
2.	"Allegria" (Instrumental)	2:40
3.	"La Dona"	3:25
4.	"Solituda"	2:35
5.	"Sueño" (Instrumental)	3:20
6.	"Djobi Djoba"	3:50
7.	"Un Amor"	3:46
8.	"Papa, No Pega La Mama"	3:00
9.	"Pharaon" (Instrumental)	4:00
10.	"Tristessa"	3:30
11.	"Recuerda"	4:30

== Credits ==
- Edited By – Yves Desjardins
- Photography By – Jacqueline Tarta
- Producer – Sara Music
- Recorded By – Pierre Braner
- Written-By – Gipsykings, Los Reyes

== Certifications and sales ==
Region	Certification	Certified units/sales
Brazil (Pro-Música Brasil)	Gold	100,000^{*}
France (SNEP)	Gold	100,000^{*}
United States	—	216,000
^{*} Sales figures based on certification alone.
