= Gipsy Kings =

French flamenco, salsa, and pop group

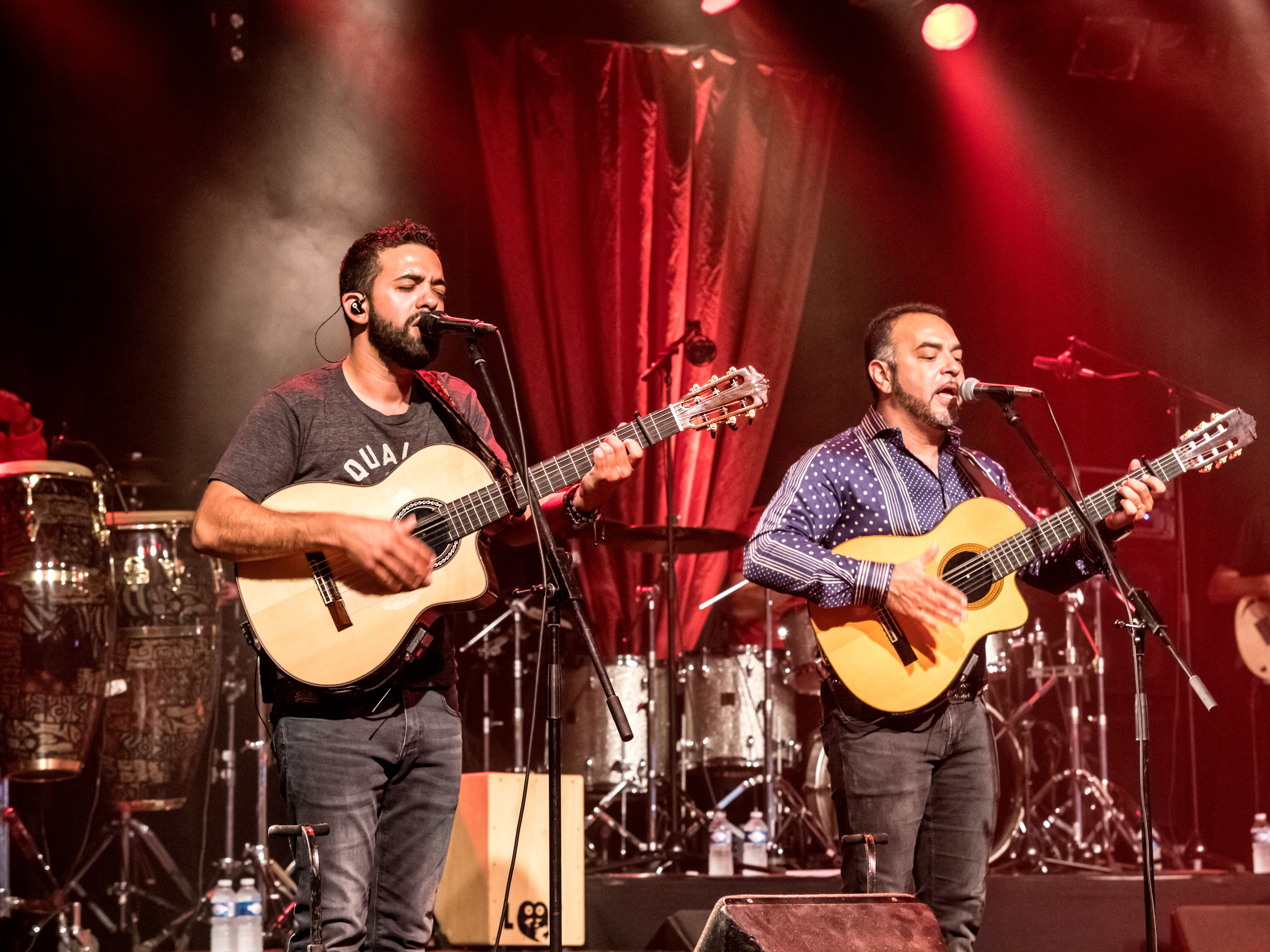
- Gipsy Kings performing in 2016

Background information
- Also known as: Los Reyes; Alma de Noche
- Origin: Arles and Montpellier, France
- Genres: Catalan rumba; flamenco; pop; rock; salsa
- Years active: 1979–present
- Labels: Elektra; Nonesuch; Columbia; SME; Knitting Factory
- Spinoffs: Chico & the Gypsies; Gipsy Kings featuring Tonino Baliardo; Gipsy Kings by André Reyes; Gitano Family
- Spinoff of: José et Los Reyes
- Members: Nicolas Reyes; Tonino Baliardo
- Past members: Canut Reyes; Chico Bouchikhi; André Reyes; Diego Baliardo; Paco Baliardo; Pablo Reyes; Patchaï Reyes
- Website: gipsykings.com

Gipsy Kings (originally Los Reyes) are a musical group founded in 1979 in Arles, France. The band, whose members have Spanish heritage, play a blend of Catalan rumba, flamenco, salsa, and pop. They perform mostly in Spanish but also mix in Catalan, French, and languages of southern France, such as Occitan.

Although the group members were born in France, their parents were mostly gitanos (Spanish Romani) who fled Spain during the 1930s Spanish Civil War. They are known for bringing rumba flamenca, a pop-oriented music distantly derived from traditional flamenco and rumba, to a worldwide audience, and for their interpretations of English-language pop hits.

== History ==
=== Beginnings: 1970s–1980s ===
In the 1970s, José Reyes and Manitas de Plata were a duo who played rumba flamenca in the southern French town of Arles. When they split up, Reyes began performing with his sons, Nicolas, François (Canut), André, Patchaï, and Paul (Pablo), as José et Los Reyes (as well as being their family name, reyes means "kings" in Spanish). After their father's death in 1979, the brothers continued to perform, joined by their cousins Diego, Paco, and Tonino Baliardo (nephews of Manitas de Plata), as well as French Moroccan musician Chico Bouchikhi, who was then married to Marthe Reyes, José's daughter. Traveling around France and playing at weddings, festivals, and in the streets as a gypsy band, they adopted the moniker Gipsy Kings, with Nicolas as lead vocalist and Tonino on lead guitar. Later, they were hired to play at upper-class parties in such places as Saint-Tropez.

Their first two albums, Allegria (1982) and Luna de Fuego (1983), attracted little notice.

=== Success: 1987–present ===
Success came for Gipsy Kings with their self-titled third album, released in 1987 (1989 in the United States), which included the songs "Djobi Djoba", "Bamboléo", and the ballad "Un Amor". The record spent forty weeks on the US charts, one of few Spanish-language albums to do so.

Pablo Reyes left the group in 1988, due to hearing problems.

Chico Bouchikhi, one of the group's founding members, left in 1991 due to financial disagreements with their then-manager, Claude Martinez, and went on to start his own group, Chico & the Gypsies.

Between 1989 and 2013, the band released nine studio albums: Mosaïque (1989), Este Mundo (1991), Love and Liberté (1993), Estrellas (1995), Compas (1997), Somos Gitanos (2001), Roots (2004), Pasajero (2006), and Savor Flamenco (2013). Their latest, Evidence, came out in 2018. Savor Flamenco won a Grammy Award for Best Global Music Album in 2014. In 1992, they issued the concert album Live.

The band have been criticised by flamenco purists, but Nicolas Reyes has argued in an interview that the flamenco world is not in great shape itself, and that the band are proud of their success. Their 1997 album, Compas, however, contains more traditional flamenco music.

== Collaborations and covers ==
Gipsy Kings recorded a cover of Frank Sinatra's "My Way", entitled "A Mi Manera", which was included on their 1987 self-titled album. A cover of the 1958 Domenico Modugno song "Volare" appears on their 1989 album, Mosaïque. They covered "I've Got No Strings" for the 1991 Disney Records direct-to-video album Simply Mad About the Mouse: A Musical Celebration of Imagination. Their version of Eagles' "Hotel California" was an example of fast flamenco guitar leads and rhythmic strumming; it was featured in the 1998 Coen Brothers' movie, The Big Lebowski. The 2010 film Toy Story 3 featured their rendition of Randy Newman's "You've Got a Friend in Me" in a Spanish-language version, titled "Hay un Amigo en Mi", and the group performed it in a recognizable flamenco style.

They have also collaborated with various musical artists, including Joan Baez, recording a version of "A Mi Manera" for her 1989 album, Speaking of Dreams. They recorded the song "Get Up!" with Captain Jack, from the Eurodance group's 1999 album, The Captain's Revenge. They published a cover of Bob Marley's "One Love" with his son Ziggy in 2001, and they recorded a cover of the Doobie Brothers' "Long Train Running" with Bananarama, under the pseudonym Alma de Noche, which was included on a 2013 re-issue of the girl band's 1991 album, Pop Life. In 2020, they featured on the song "Ciclone" by Takagi & Ketra, with vocals by Elodie and Mariah Angeliq. A year later, they shared credits with Spanish rapper C. Tangana on the song "Ingobernable", which appeared on his album El Madrileño.

== Solo projects ==
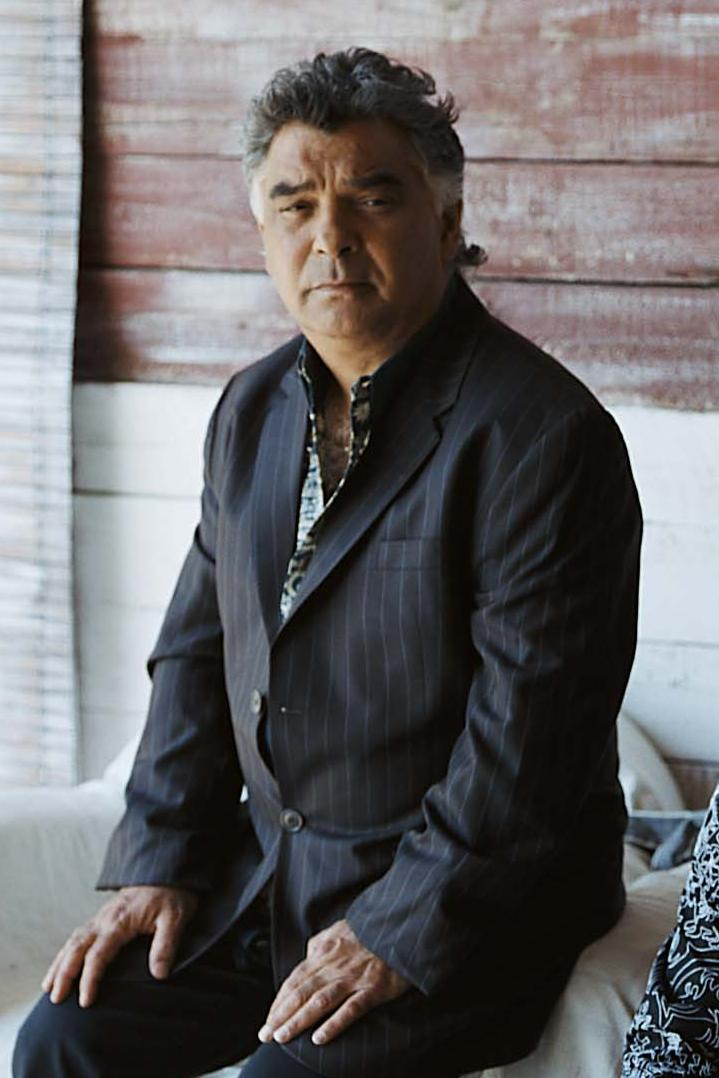
Nicolas Reyes remains the frontman of the recording act.

Individual members of the band have toured with their own projects and released solo albums. In 1989, Canut Reyes published Boléro, and in 2012, his second album, Gitano, came out.

Tonino Baliardo released an instrumental album in 2001, titled Essences. He followed it two years later with Tonino Baliardo. In 2023, he issued Renaissance, under the name of his touring band, Gipsy Kings featuring Tonino Baliardo.

In 2022, Nicolas Reyes and Moroccan musician Saad Lamjarred collaborated to pay tribute to King Mohammed VI on Throne Day, releasing the song "Viva El Rey Habibna".

André Reyes performs with his own band, under the name Gipsy Kings by André Reyes. The group consists of André and a number of his relatives, including his son Thomas, nephews Kakou and Tambo, brother Patchaï, and first cousin Mario, as well as four backing musicians. In 2022, they released the album Nací Gitano.

Patchaï Reyes performs as Gitano Family with his son.

Founding member Chico Bouchikhi tours with his band Chico & the Gypsies. They have released numerous albums since 1992.

== Band members ==
Gipsy Kings originally consisted of two parent families: Reyes and Baliardo. The Reyes brothers, sons of Jose Reyes, are nephews of Manitas de Plata, while the Baliardo brothers are his sons.

Current

- Nicolas Reyes – lead vocals (1978–present)
- Tonino Baliardo – lead guitar (1978–present)

Past

- Canut Reyes – vocals, guitar (1978–?)
- Chico Bouchikhi – guitar (1978–1991)
- André Reyes – guitar, backing vocals (1978–?)
- Diego Baliardo – guitar (1978–?)
- Paco Baliardo – guitar (1978–?)
- Pablo Reyes – guitar, backing vocals (1978–1988)
- Patchaï Reyes – guitar, backing vocals (1978–?)

== Discography ==
- Allegria (1982)
- Luna de Fuego (1983)
- Gipsy Kings (1987)
- Mosaïque (1989)
- Este Mundo (1991) – nominated for a Grammy Award for Best Global Music Album
- Love and Liberté (1993) – nominated for a Grammy Award for Best Global Music Album
- Estrellas (1995) – released in the US as Tierra Gitana, with minor track list differences
- Tierra Gitana (1996) – US version of Estrellas; nominated for a Grammy Award for Best Global Music Album
- Compas (1997) – nominated for a Grammy Award for Best Global Music Album
- Somos Gitanos (2001)
- Roots (2004)
- Pasajero (2006)
- Savor Flamenco (2013) – won a Grammy Award for Best Global Music Album
- Evidence (2018)

== Awards and recognition ==
- 1990: Victoires de la Musique – Group of the Year
- 2014: Grammy Award for Best Global Music Album

== See also ==
- New flamenco
- List of best-selling Latin music artists
