= Rumba flamenca =

Flamenco style

- Stylistic origins: Flamenco, guaracha, Cuban rumba
- Cultural origins: Andalusia, late 19th century
- Typical instruments: Vocals, flamenco guitar, castanets, hand clapping, cajón
- Derivative forms: Rumba catalana

Rumba flamenca, also known as flamenco rumba or simply rumba (Spanish pronunciation: [ˈrumba]), is a palo (style) of flamenco music developed in Andalusia, Spain. It is known as one of the cantes de ida y vuelta (roundtrip songs), music which diverged in the new world, then returned to Spain in a new form. The genre originated in the 19th century in Andalusia, southern Spain, where Cuban music first reached the country.

== History ==
Rumba flamenca was primarily influenced by guaracha, an uptempo style of vocal music which originated in Havana's musical theatre. Some elements from Cuban rumba were also incorporated, although minor, despite the name. Although unlikely, both guaracha and Cuban rumba might have been influenced by flamenco earlier in the 19th century. Guarachas can be traced back to the Spanish jácaras, thus justifying the classification of rumba flamenca as a cante de ida y vuelta.

The first rumba flamenca recordings were made by La Niña de los Peines in the 1910s. During the late 20th century, Paco de Lucía, together with percussionist Rubem Dantas, incorporated Afro-Peruvian musical elements such as the cajón (wooden box) and certain rhythms.

== Terminology ==
In term rumba as applied to the flamenco style stems from its use in Cuba to refer to Cuban rumba (originally, "rumba" meant "party"). Within flamenco circles, the genre is simply called "rumba", and other terms have been used to distinguish it from Cuban rumba, including gypsy rumba (rumba gitana) and Spanish rumba, which are nonetheless ambiguous since they may also be used to mean Catalan rumba or other contemporary styles such as tecno-rumba.

== Instrumentation ==
The rumba flamenca instrumentation consists of flamenco guitars, hand clapping, occasional body slapping, castanets and the cajón. As a result, it bears little resemblance to Cuban rumba, whose instrumentation is based on the congas and claves. Nonetheless, some artists such as Paco de Lucía and Tomatito have included congas alongside their cajones in their ensembles, although with a minor role.

== Music theory ==
In Cuba, the rumba is performed with multiple percussion instruments, playing in duple meter. The flamenco version of it uses palmas, guitar, and golpes (slapping the guitar). In addition, rumba flamenca has a particular guitar strumming pattern absent in other flamenco styles.

The rhythm is a modified tresillo rhythm with eight beats grouped into a repeating pattern of 3+3+2. Unlike traditional flamenco, rumbas may be played in any key, major, minor and modal. At approx. 100-120bpm, the tempo of rumba flamenca is slower than other more traditional flamenco styles such as bulerías and fandangos. There are 4 beats per bar with an accent on the 2nd and 4th beats.

== Dance ==
The rumba flamenca dance has some origins in Catalonia, specifically in the downtown areas of Barcelona, where gypsies performed rumba catalana at the times of this genre's flowering popularity. The dance that it accompanied was improvised with prominent hip and shoulder movements, more overtly sexual than other styles of flamenco dances.

== See also ==
- New flamenco
