= Catalan rumba =

Spanish music genre originating among Barcelona Romani

The Catalan rumba (Catalan: rumba catalana, IPA: [ˈrumbə kətəˈlanə]) is a genre of music that developed in Barcelona's Romani community beginning in the 1950s and 1960s. Its rhythms are derived from the Andalusian flamenco rumba, with influences from Cuban music and rock and roll.

The Catalan rumba originated in the Romani communities in the Gràcia, carrer (street) de la Cera del Raval and Hostafrancs neighborhoods. The Romani community in those neighborhoods is long-established and bilingual in Catalan and were influenced by the heavy Andalusian immigration to Barcelona during this period.

The genre is based in a fusion of Catalan-Andalusian flamenco singing and the Afro-Cuban claves. It is in 4/4 time, and consists of vocalists and handclaps, accompanied by guitar, bongos, and güiro; later groups also incorporate timbales, conga drums, small percussion instruments, piano, wind instruments, electric bass, and electric keyboard.

Among the most important early artists in the genre were Antonio González "El Pescaílla", Peret, Josep Maria Valentí "El Chacho", followed by the duo Los Amaya. In the 1970s, Gato Pérez rejuvenated the Catalan rumba. An important medium for diffusion of this genre were cheap cassette tapes sold at gas stations. In the 1980s and 1990s, the Gipsy Kings and Los Manolos brought their spirit to Catalan rumba. 13 rumba songs were played as the final act of the 1992 Summer Olympics closing ceremony.

Recently, popular groups in the genre have included Gitano Family, Ai, ai, ai, Sabor de Gràcia, Estopa, El Chinchilla, Melendi, Muchachito Bombo Infierno, Gertrudis, and La Troba Kung Fú. Most recently the genre has been adopted by Brazilian singer Flávia Coelho.

== Bibliography ==
- Peret, l'ànima d'un poble., by Cèlia Sànchez-Mústich. Edicions 62 (2005)
- Gato Pérez., by Juan Marcos Ordóñez Diví, Ediciones Júcar (1987)
