= Full Circle: Carnegie Hall 2000 =

2001 live album by Ravi Shankar

Live album by Ravi Shankar
- Released: March 27, 2001
- Recorded: October 6, 2000
- Venue: Carnegie Hall
- Genres: Hindustani classical; world
- Length: 62:34
- Label: Angel
- Producer: Hans Wendl

Ravi Shankar chronology
Vision of Peace: The Art of Ravi Shankar (2000)	Full Circle: Carnegie Hall 2000 (2001)	Flowers of India (2007)

Full Circle: Carnegie Hall 2000 is a live album by Indian musician and composer Ravi Shankar, released in 2001 through the record label Angel Records. Recorded at Carnegie Hall in October 2000 as part of a tour with Shankar's daughter Anoushka, the album contains five tracks and presents two ragas. The concert occurred sixty-two years after Shankar's first performance at Carnegie Hall and commemorated his eightieth birthday; the album was his first live recording in nearly twenty years. Full Circle was produced by Hans Wendl, mastered by Scott Hull, and mixed and engineered by Tom Lazarus. Featured are performances by Tanmoy Bose and Bickram Ghosh on tabla, and Anoushka and Ravi on sitar.

In 2001, the album peaked at ninth position on Billboard's Top World Music Albums chart and earned Shankar the Grammy Award for Best World Music Album.

== Background and composition ==
The title was thought out by the promoter and agent, but I guess there's meaning to it. It sounds nice, maybe in the sense that I started performing publicly and coming to Carnegie Hall at age 19. But there's also the connection of Anoushka playing with me.

— Shankar on the album's title

Full Circle was recorded at Carnegie Hall in New York City on October 6, 2000, as part of a tour of the same name in which Ravi introduced his nineteen-year-old daughter and student Anoushka Shankar. Anoushka began studying at age nine and is the only musician in the world trained exclusively by Ravi. The concert commemorated Shankar's eightieth birthday and occurred sixty-two years after his first performance at the venue as a member of his brother Uday Shankar's Indian dance group. The album also marked Shankar's first live recording in nearly twenty years. The Carnegie Hall concert was held specifically for the purpose of recording a live album, despite Shankar's hesitations about using "traditional recording considerations" to capture improvisational music.

Full Circle contains two ragas presented in five tracks totaling just over one hour in length. Kaushi Kanhara (a compound raga that combines Malkauns and Darbari Kanada) is separated in an alap portion (an unaccompanied introduction) which includes jor and jhala (playing with pulse and fast pulse), and a gat portion (composition with tabla accompaniment). Mishra Gara is introduced with an aochar (a short alap), and features two gats, in a single thirty-minute track. Hans Wendl worked as record producer and Scott Hull mastered the album, which was mixed and engineered by Tom Lazarus and features performances by Tanmoy Bose and Bickram Ghosh on tabla, and Anoushka and Ravi on sitar. Shankar said he was successful in reaching his goal of presenting variety on the album by incorporating both "ancient" and "contemporary, semi-classical" styles and reaching a musical climax quickly.

Gilbert Heatherwick, an Angel Records executive, said that the label sought to market the album as an "event record" and would position it "upfront in pop departments". Angel promoted the album through NPR stations and mainstream press outlets as a "human interest story", focusing on Shankar's career and how the album exemplifies its title. Full Circle was released in India through the EMI-owned label Virgin India.

Anoushka Shankar's album Live at Carnegie Hall was recorded at Carnegie Hall the same evening. The album was released in December 2001 and earned her a nomination for Best World Music Album at the 45th Grammy Awards (2003), making her the youngest musician nominated in the category.

== Reception ==
Professional ratings
Review scores
Source	Rating
Allmusic	3/5 stars
Yoga Journal	(positive)

Allmusic's Sean Westergaard awarded the album three of five stars and called it an "excellent recording". He complimented Ravi's musicianship and dexterity, particularly during the fast gat section of Mishra Gara, but suggested that alap and jor might be too long for some Western listeners. Yoga Journal's Derk Richardson wrote that Shankar's fast fingering and "ingenious note choices ... conspire to create a mesmerizing swirl". Richardson complimented all instrumental performers, as well as producer Hans Wendl, for recording the ensemble with "striking clarity", and called Shankar's playing "timeless". Bill Meyer wrote in his 2005 review for the Chicago Reader that Shankar was not as fast as he used to be but that he was still a "thrilling improviser".

== Chart performance and recognition ==
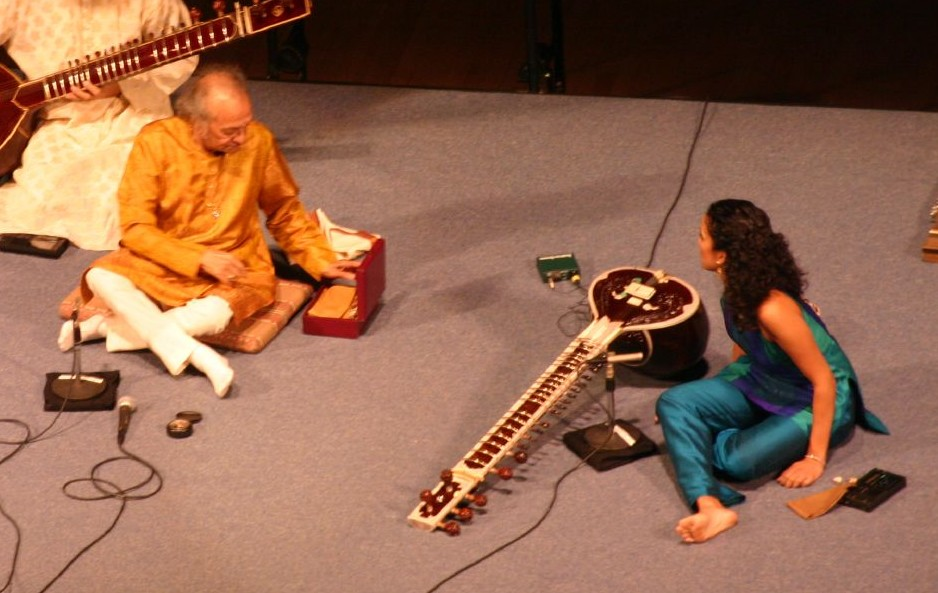
Ravi Shankar and Anoushka Shankar performing in 2005

Full Circle reached a peak position of nine on Billboard's Top World Music Albums chart the week of May 5, 2001. At the 44th Grammy Awards in 2002, the album earned Shankar a Grammy Award for Best World Music Album. This marked Shankar's third Grammy win, after he was previously recognized along with Yehudi Menuhin for the collaborative album West Meets East, and with George Harrison, et al. at the 15th Grammy Awards in 1973 for The Concert for Bangladesh. Following the 2002 Grammy win, tabla musician Bickram Ghosh said he enjoyed the recognition but insisted the "limelight" would not affect his future playing. When The Times of India questioned whether or not tanpura musicians received adequate praise for their contributions to the album, Ghosh responded that the tanpura is a "drawn instrument and not a performance art." Of his performances alongside Shankar, Ghosh rated the Carnegie Hall concert an eight on a ten-point scale, saving a nine rating for the Toronto Ford Centre concert in 1997. According to the Ravi Shankar Foundation, the album also won first place in the Traditional World category at the 5th Annual NAV Music Awards.

Chart (2001)	Peak position
Billboard's Top World Music Albums	9

== Track listing ==
All songs written by Ravi Shankar.

1. "Introduction I" – 1:37
2. "Raga Kaushi Kanhara: Alap-Jor-Jhala" – 19:02
3. "Raga Kaushi Kanhara: Gat in Dhamar" – 10:04
4. "Introduction II" – 1:37
5. "Raga Mishra Gara: Aochar/Slow Gat and Fast Gat in Teental" – 30:14

Track listing adapted from Allmusic.

== Personnel ==
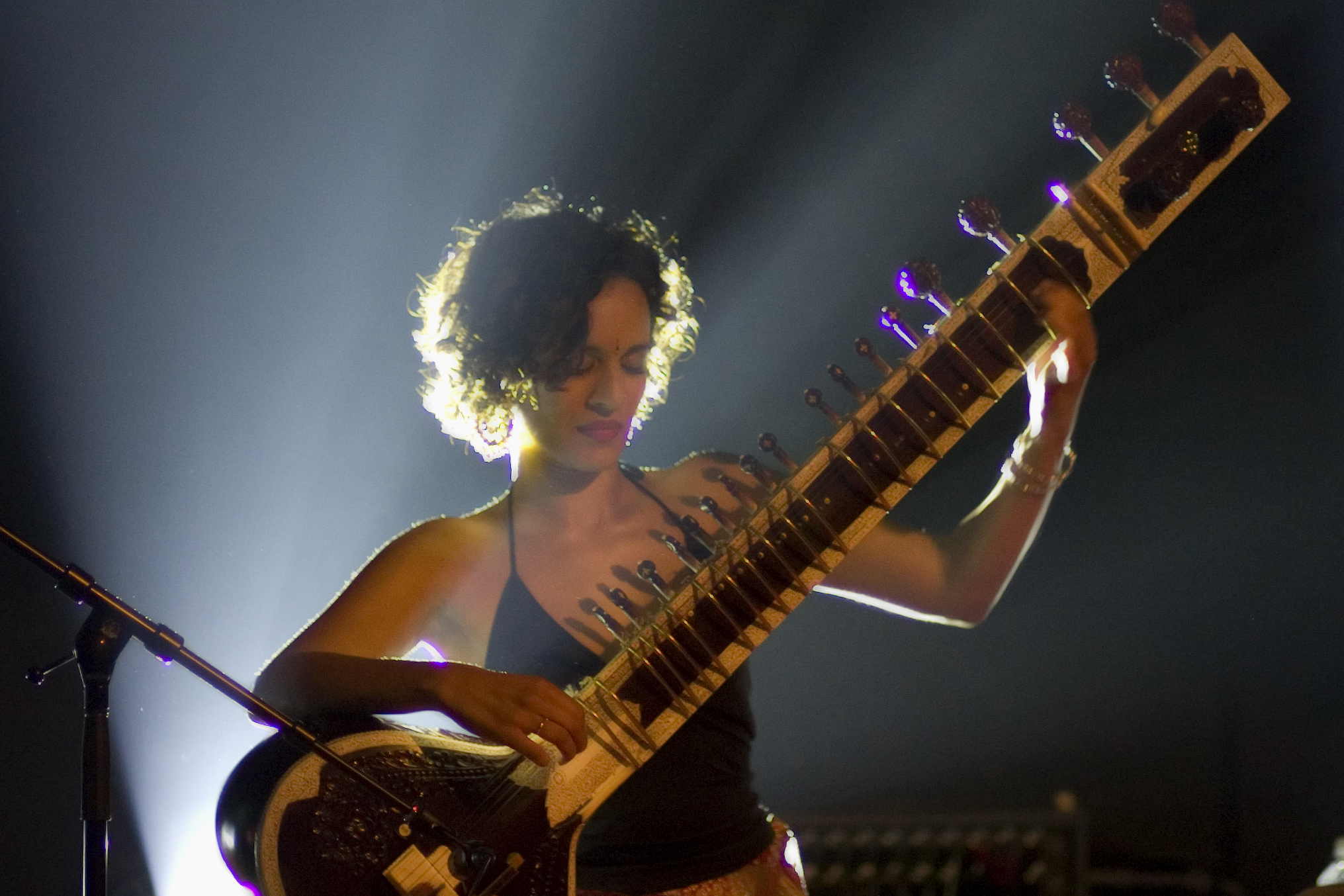
Anoushka Shankar in 2007

- Tanmoy Bose – tabla
- Bickram Ghosh – tabla
- Caroline Greyshock – cover photo
- Scott Hull – mastering
- Tom Lazarus – engineer, mixing
- Jessica Novod – art direction, design
- Barry Phillips – tanpura
- Anoushka Shankar – sitar
- Ravi Shankar – sitar
- Ajay Sharma – tanpura
- Marc Stedman – assistant
- Hans Wendl – producer
- Timothy White – liner notes

Credits adapted from Allmusic.

== See also ==
- Concert for George (album), a 2003 tribute album to George Harrison featuring Ravi and Anoushka Shankar
- Music of India
