= Live Earth =

Organization

- Genre: Pop / Rock
- Dates: 7 July 2007
- Locations: Sydney, Johannesburg, New Jersey, Rio de Janeiro, Antarctica, Tokyo, Kyoto, Shanghai, London, Hamburg, Washington, D.C., and Rome
- Years active: 2007
- Founders: Al Gore, Kevin Wall
- Website: liveearth.org

Live Earth was an event developed to increase environmental awareness through entertainment.

== Background ==
Founded by producer Kevin Wall, in partnership with former U.S. Vice President Al Gore.

== Live Earth 2007 ==
The 1st series of benefit concerts were held on 7 July 2007. The concerts brought together more than 150 musical acts in eleven locations around the world and were broadcast to a mass global audience through television, radio, and live internet streams.

== Live Earth India 2008 ==
The second Live Earth concert was scheduled for 7 December 2008 at the Andheri Sports Complex on Veera Desai Road in Andheri West, Mumbai, India and was managed by Kevin Wall who, after a request from former U. S. Vice President Al Gore, planned to have the entire event take place in India. In September 2008, Reuters stated that, "the December event will see U.S. rocker Jon Bon Jovi and Bollywood's biggest superstar, Amitabh Bachchan share the stage, and is described by organisers as one of the biggest events held in India." Shekhar Kapur, Nobel laureate Rajendra Pachauri, Abhishek Bachchan, and Aishwarya Rai also planned to star in the event. Additional acts included Shankar–Ehsaan–Loy, Hrithik Roshan, Preity Zinta, Roger Waters of Pink Floyd, will.i.am, Hard Kaur, and Anoushka Shankar. Palash Sen stated that his band, Euphoria, was scheduled to launch a song written for the concert on the topic of global warming.

Live Earth would have been broadcast by STAR TV (Asia), which works in conjunction with the STAR Plus channel (United Kingdom, Middle East) and the Star World Channel. MSN was "the exclusive global broadband partner for Live Earth India."

The concert was cancelled shortly after the 2008 Mumbai attacks on 26 November 2008. Wall, Gore, and Pachauri stated in a joint press release that, "due to circumstances far beyond our control, we are saddened to announce that Live Earth India has been cancelled. We will continue to work for solutions to the climate crisis for the good of the people of India and around the world. But for now, our thoughts and our prayers are with the victims of this terrible attack, with the bereaved, with the people of Mumbai and with everyone in India." Some argued against the cancellation stating that "music could have helped fear-hardened Mumbai to ride the storm." Jethro Tull and Anoushka Shankar, who also cancelled their 29 November Mumbai concert after the 2008 Mumbai attacks, reorganized the performance as A Billion Hands Concert, a benefit performance for victims of the attacks, and held it in Mumbai on 5 December 2008.

== Dow Live Earth Run for Water ==
The Dow Live Earth Run for Water took place 18 April 2010 and consisted of a series of 6 km run/walks (the average distance many women and children walk every day to secure water) taking place over the course of 24 hours in countries around the world, featuring concerts and water education activities aimed at igniting a tipping point to help solve the water crisis. Jessica Biel, Alexandra Cousteau, Pete Wentz, Angélique Kidjo and Jenny Fletcher were due to lend their names and their time in support.

=== Controversy ===
Before and after the event, there was concern over the sponsorship of the Run For Water by Dow Chemical. Their sponsorship of this event has been described as "the ultimate in greenwashing", given Dow's ownership of Union Carbide, their refusal to clean up the Bhopal site, plus their direct responsibility for groundwater poisoning incidents in Morrisonville, Louisiana and the Tittabawassee River in Michigan. Their much-publicised water filtration plants in India have failed because the local population cannot afford to replace the expensive high-tech filters. Furthermore, most of the Dow sponsorship for the event was spent on for-profits doing marketing, public relations, and event management (e.g., Ignition, Golin Harris, Active.com) rather than the non-profits identified as "beneficiaries."

=== Host cities ===
The Dow Live Earth Run for Water was hosted by about 200 cities around the world, including: Amsterdam, Atlanta, Brussels, Buenos Aires, Cairo, Cape Town, Chicago, Chongqing, Copenhagen, Hong Kong, Istanbul, Jakarta, Jerusalem, Jimbaran, Karachi, Lima, Lisbon, Los Angeles, Manila, Melbourne, Mexico City, Minneapolis, Monterrey, Montreal, New York City, Rio de Janeiro, São Paulo, San Diego, Santiago, Santo Domingo, Seattle, Singapore City, Sydney, Toronto, Vancouver and Washington, D.C.

==== Live performances ====
Many of the cities featured live entertainment following the 6K run/walk. Artists include Melissa Etheridge in Los Angeles with The Roots; special guest John Legend in Brooklyn's Prospect Park; Rob Thomas in Atlanta; Collective Soul with special guest Sam Moore in Chicago; Kany García in Mexico City; Kevin Johansen and The Nada in Buenos Aires; and Slank in Bali.

==== Cancellations and protests ====
Demonstrations against the run had been planned by the International Campaign for Justice in Bhopal.

The Dow sponsorship of the Run For Water was protested by organizations representing the victims of the Bhopal tragedy, supported by Amnesty International. Planned events were also cancelled in Milan.

In New Delhi, the event was protested by a group of activists who disguised their involvement by creating a fictitious front organization, the Hindustan Sea Turtle Alliance, to register their event with Live Earth.

=== Beneficiaries ===
Concert organizers solicited full proposals from a broad network of NGO partners including Global Water Challenge, A Child's Right, Akvo, Fondo Para La Paz, Indonesia Water Partnership, Lien Aid, Pump Aid, Wildlands Conservation Trust, and many others. However, very little money was raised (approximately $50,000). Most of the Dow sponsorship was spent on for-profits doing marketing, public relations, and event management (e.g., Ignition, Golin Harris, Active.com). The remaining proceeds from the Dow Live Earth Run for Water were disseminated primarily to the Global Water Challenge.

== See also ==
- List of historic rock festivals
- An Inconvenient Truth
- Climate change
- Earth Hour
- Global warming
- Hurricane Katrina
- Individual and political action on climate change
- Politics of global warming
- Save Our Selves
- Denmark plants trees
