= Rise (Anoushka Shankar album) =

Studio album by Anoushka Shankar
- Released: 27 September 2005
- Recorded: New Delhi, March - July 2005
- Genre: Indian music, ambient
- Label: Angel Records
- Producer: Anoushka Shankar

Anoushka Shankar chronology
Live at Carnegie Hall (2001)	Rise (2005)	Breathing Under Water (2007)

Professional ratings
Review scores
Source	Rating
AllMusic	4/5 stars

Rise is an album by Anoushka Shankar released on 27 September 2005. The album was chosen as one of Amazon.com's Top 100 Editor's Picks of 2005 (#82). On previous recordings, Anoushka Shankar had followed in the footsteps of her father, Ravi Shankar, by performing relatively traditional, raga-based music. Rise, by contrast, incorporated jazz, pop, and pan-ethnic world music textures in an unpredictable melange. At the center of it all are Shankar's sitar expertise and traditional Indian roots.

== Track listing ==
All tracks are written by Anoushka Shankar, except "Solea" written by Shankar/Pedro Ricardo.

No.	Title	Length
1.	"Prayer in Passing"	6:20
2.	"Red Sun"	4:50
3.	"Mahadeva"	5:42
4.	"Naked"	4:16
5.	"Solea"	7:26
6.	"Beloved"	7:05
7.	"Sinister Grains"	6:10
8.	"Voice of the Moon"	8:54
9.	"Ancient Love"	11:06

== Personnel ==
1. Anoushka Shankar: Sitar, keyboards, vocals
2. Vishwa Mohan Bhatt: Veena
3. Rajendra Prasanna: Shehnai
4. Barry Phillips: Cello
5. Pedro Eustache: Bansuri, duduk
6. Ajay Prasanna: Bansuri
7. Pedro Ricardo Mino: Piano
8. Pulak Sarcar: Keyboards
9. Kevin Cooper: Bass guitar
10. Jesse Charnow: Drums and percussion
11. Tanmoy Bose: Djembe, tabla
12. Sanjeev Chimmalgi: Backing vocals
13. Ritesh Mishra: Backing vocals
14. Rajneesh Mishra: Backing vocals

== Charts ==
Chart (2005)	Peak position
US Heatseekers Albums (Billboard)	29
US World Albums (Billboard)	2
