= Anourag =

Studio album by Anoushka Shankar
- Released: 15 August 2000
- Recorded: November–December 1999
- Genre: Indian classical music
- Label: Angel Records
- Producer: Stephen Ferrera

Anoushka Shankar chronology
Anoushka (1998)	Anourag (2000)	Live at Carnegie Hall (2001)

Professional ratings
Review scores
Source	Rating
AllMusic	3/5 stars

Anourag is an album of Indian classical music performed by Anoushka Shankar, released in 2000. Anoushka Shankar's father, sitar master Ravi Shankar, adapted six ragas for her to play on this album.

== Track listing ==
All songs by Ravi Shankar.

1. "Shuddha Sarang" – 12:38
2. "Puriya Dhanashri" – 11:23
3. "Hamsadhwani Tabla Duet" – 3:54
4. "Yaman Kalyan" – 7:46
5. "Swarna Jayanti" – 5:53
6. "Pancham Se Gara" – 11:48

== Personnel ==
- Anoushka Shankar: Sitar, vocals
- Ravi Shankar: Sitar
- Sukanya Shankar: Tamboura
- Barry Phillips: Tamboura
- Anthony Karasek: Tamboura
- Bikram Ghosh: Mridangam, tabla
- Tanmoy Bose: Tabla
