= Mumbai Football Arena =

Multipurpose stadium located in Mumbai, India

- Andheri Sports Complex
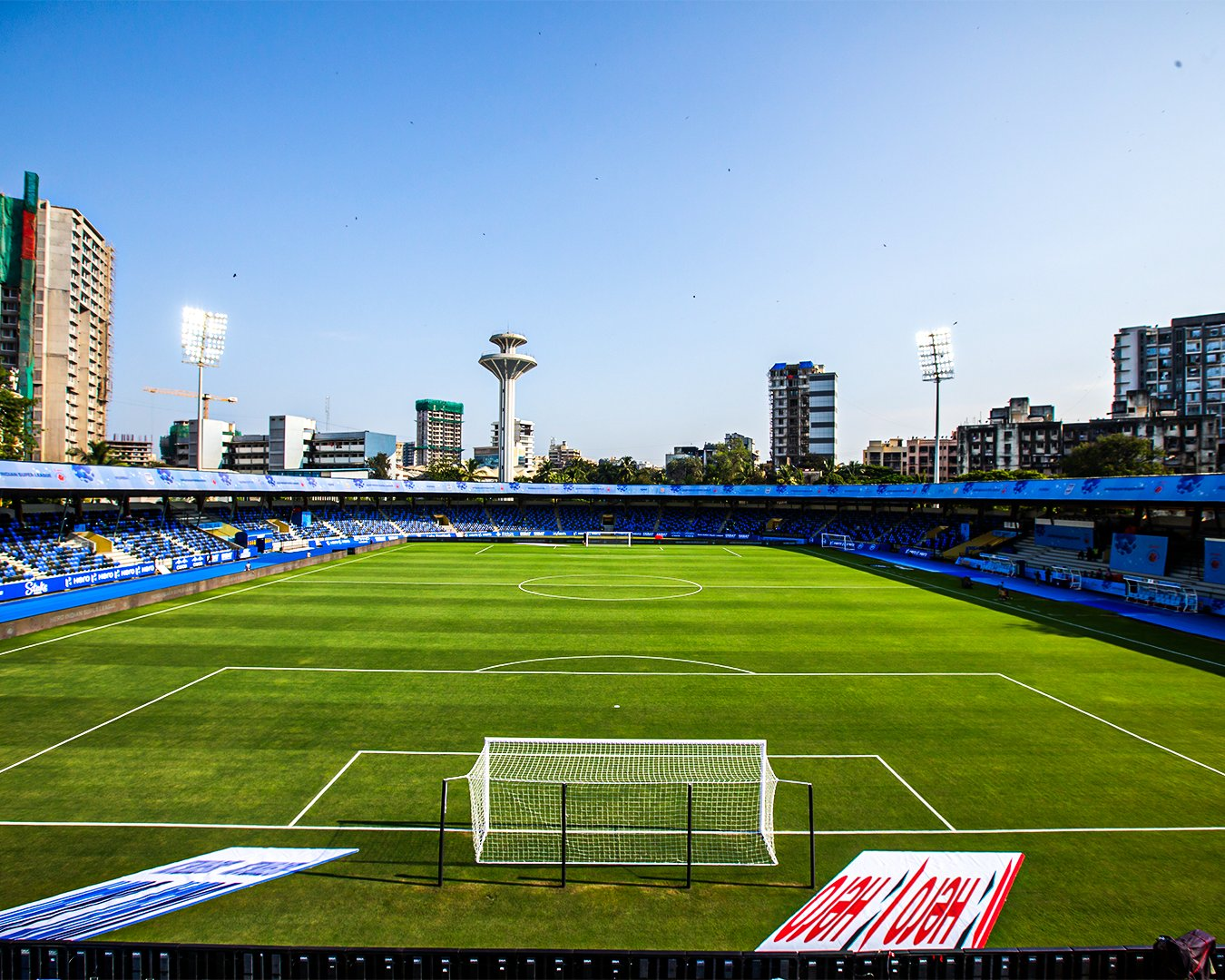
- Interior of the stadium in 2022
- Interactive map of Mumbai Football Arena
- Full name: Mumbai Football Arena
- Former names: Shahaji Raje Krida Sankul
- Location: Veera Desai Road, Andheri West, Mumbai
- Coordinates: 19°7′46.0164″N 72°50′10.1718″E
- Owner: Brihanmumbai Municipal Corporation
- Operator: Mumbai City FC
- Capacity: 7,000
- Surface: Grass
- Scoreboard: Yes
- Record attendance: 8,890 in 2018 Intercontinental Cup (India)
- Public transit: Azad Nagar; Andheri

Construction
- Built: 1988
- Opened: 1988
- Renovated: 2022

Tenants
- India national football team (2016–present); Mumbai City FC (2016–present); Rugby Premier League (2025)

Mumbai Football Arena is a football stadium in Mumbai, India. It is located in the Andheri Sports Complex. It is one of the few football-only built stadiums in the country.

== History ==
Established as part of the Andheri Sports Complex in 1988 by the Brihanmumbai Municipal Corporation, the arena was developed to support local and national sports events, with the football-specific facilities upgraded over time, including renovations for the 2017 FIFA U-17 World Cup, to host professional matches. Mumbai City FC began using the venue as its home starting from the 2016 Indian Super League, transforming it into a key hub for the city's growing football scene. The stadium's location in Andheri West provides convenient access via the Azad Nagar metro station (850 meters away) and Andheri railway station (2.3 kilometers away), providing seamless connectivity for the spectators and enhancing its role in promoting grassroots and elite-level football in urban Mumbai.

== Notable events ==
The India national football team played a FIFA international friendly on 3 September 2016, beating the Puerto Rico national football team 4–1 in front of a packed stadium. This was the first international friendly hosted by the city in 61 years.

On 6 June 2017, the stadium hosted an international friendly match between India and Nepal, which India won 2–0. Goals from Sandesh Jhingan and Jeje Lalpekhlua secured the victory for the hosts.

The stadium hosted the 2017 Hero Tri-Nation Series between India, Saint Kitts and Nevis, and Mauritius, which was won by India after topping the table.

In June 2018, the stadium hosted all 7 matches of the 2018 Intercontinental Cup, in which the Indian men's football team played against Kenya, New Zealand, and Chinese Taipei, in a four-way tournament. India beat Kenya 2–0 in the final to win the tournament. Attendance for India's opening match against Chinese Taipei was relatively low. In response, captain Sunil Chhetri made a public appeal for greater fan support, after which all of India's subsequent matches at the stadium were sold out.

The stadium hosted the 2019 Indian Super League Final between Bengaluru FC and FC Goa on 17 March 2019. Bengaluru FC won 1–0 after extra time, with Mumbai-born defender Rahul Bheke scoring the decisive goal in the 117th minute. The victory secured Bengaluru FC's first Indian Super League title, having finished runners-up in the previous season after losing the final to Chennaiyin FC.

In December 2019, the stadium hosted matches of the U-17 Women’s Tri-Nation Tournament involving India, Sweden and Thailand, held as a preparatory event for the FIFA U-17 Women’s World Cup 2020. Sweden won the tournament, defeating India 4–0 in the final.

The stadium hosted matches during the 2022 AFC Women's Asian Cup, one of three venues selected for the tournament in India.

In 2025, the stadium served as the sole venue for the inaugural Rugby Premier League, hosting all matches of the tournament.

== Redevelopment and upgrades ==
The redevelopment and modernisation of the stadium involved contributions from key stakeholders, including local politician Aaditya Thackeray and actor Ranbir Kapoor, who is associated with Mumbai City FC ownership. Ahead of the 2022–23 Indian Super League season, the venue underwent significant upgrades, including the installation of bucket seating. Prior to these renovations, the stadium had an approximate seating capacity ranging from 7,690 to 9,000 spectators, which was subsequently standardised following the redevelopment.

== See also ==
- Cooperage Ground
