= Breathing Under Water (album) =

Studio album by Anoushka Shankar and Karsh Kale
- Released: 28 August 2007
- Genre: World music
- Length: 62:00
- Label: Manhattan Records
- Producer: Anoushka Shankar, Gaurav Raina, Karsh Kale

Anoushka Shankar chronology
Rise (2005)	Breathing Under Water (2007)	Traveller (2011)

Karsh Kale chronology
Broken English (2006)	Breathing Under Water (2007)	Cinema (2010)

Professional ratings
Review scores
Source	Rating
Allmusic	4/5 stars
All About Jazz	(Positive)
The New York Times	(not rated)
Okayplayer	4/5 stars

Breathing Under Water is an album by Anoushka Shankar and Karsh Kale released on 28 August 2007. Shankar and Kale expand beyond cultural and traditional borders of music with this collaboration. With the help of featured guests Ravi Shankar, Sting, Norah Jones, Midival Punditz, Salim Merchant, Vishwa Mohan Bhatt and others, the duo blended Indian classical music, electronica, dance and folk styles.

== Track listing ==
No.	Title	Length
1.	"Burn"	5:43
2.	"Slither"	6:25
3.	"Breathing Under Water"	2:29
4.	"Sea Dreamer" (featuring Sting)	5:40
5.	"Ghost Story"	5:47
6.	"PD7"	7:21
7.	"Easy" (featuring Norah Jones)	3:30
8.	"Little Glass Folk"	5:13
9.	"A Perfect Rain"	4:29
10.	"Abyss"	5:22
11.	"Oceanic, Part 1" (featuring Ravi Shankar)	4:07
12.	"Oceanic, Part 2" (featuring Ravi Shankar)	4:40
13.	"Reprise"	1:23

== Personnel ==
Musicians

- Anoushka Shankar – synthesizer, piano, keyboards, sitar, tanpura
- Karsh Kale – synthesizer, acoustic guitar, bass, piano, electric bass, cymbals, drums, electric guitar, keyboards, tabla, vocals, snare drums, electronic percussion, orchestral percussion
- Ravi Shankar – sitar
- Vishwa Mohan Bhatt – mohan veena
- Pedro Eustache – flute
- Sting – vocals (track 4)
- Shankar Mahadevan: vocals
- Norah Jones – piano, vocals (track 7)
- Pirashanna Thevarajah – mridangam, kanjira, moorsing
- Vishal Vaid – vocals
- Salim Merchant – piano, keyboards
- Sunidhi Chauhan – vocals
- Ravi Shankar – guest appearance

Technical personnel

- John Stewart – engineering
- Greg Calbi – mastering
- Herbert Waltl – executive production
- Gordon Jee – art direction
- Anoushka Shankar – arrangements, production, string arrangements
- Saul Williams – author
- Brian Montgomery – engineering
- Karsh Kale – arrangements, production, string arrangements, drum programming
- Gaurav Raina – programming, production, engineering, atmosphere
- Salim Merchant – arrangements, production, string arrangements
- Chad Lupo – assistant arranger
- Jayant Luthra – programming
- Jonathan Dagan – engineering

== Charts ==
Chart (2007)	Peak position
French Albums (SNEP)	177
US Heatseekers Albums (Billboard)	40
US World Albums (Billboard)	6
