= Concert for George (album) =

Live album by various artists
- Released: 17 November 2003
- Recorded: 29 November 2002
- Venue: Royal Albert Hall (London)
- Genres: Disc 1: Indian classical music Disc 2: Rock
- Length: 116:50
- Label: Warner Bros.
- Producer: Jeff Lynne

Professional ratings
Review scores
Source	Rating
AllMusic	3/5 stars
Hot Press	7/10
Record Collector	4/5 stars
Uncut	4/5 stars

Concert for George is a live tribute soundtrack album in honour of George Harrison, recorded on the first anniversary of his death, and issued in 2003 in conjunction with the simultaneous DVD release of the same name. Featuring performances of many of Harrison's best-known songs, played by his closest musician friends, Concert for George is considered a fitting and heartfelt celebration of Harrison's considerable career.

== Tribute concert ==
Recorded at the Royal Albert Hall in London on 29 November 2002—the first anniversary of Harrison's death—the performance features a wealth of talents who knew Harrison well. Eric Clapton, one of Harrison's closest friends, served as the musical director of the show, which was advertised as the Concert for George. Representing Indian music, an important influence on Harrison's life, is Ravi Shankar and his daughter Anoushka Shankar. Among Harrison's rock and roll cohorts are Jeff Lynne, Gary Brooker, Joe Brown, Tom Petty and the Heartbreakers, Billy Preston and Jim Keltner, together with Harrison's former Beatles bandmates Ringo Starr and Paul McCartney, and his son Dhani.

Before the Indian portion that opened the concert, Ravi Shankar said to the audience: "I strongly feel that George is here tonight. I mean, how can he not be here, when all of us who loved him so much have assembled here to sing for him and play music for him? I'm sure he's here."

== Release and reception ==
Concert for George was issued on 17 November 2003 in Britain, with a US release following on 18 November. A double album, it peaked at number 97 on America's Billboard chart.

Uncut magazine's reviewer wrote: "Concerts like these are usually long on sentiment and short on worthwhile content. But under the directorship of Eric Clapton, the concert for George Harrison at the Albert Hall in November 2002 was an exception. The event exudes a powerful atmosphere and genuine musicality…" Writing in The Word, Paul Du Noyer described the posthumous tribute to Harrison as "the grandest send-off that he could possibly have wished for". Du Noyer said of the live album, "Its sins are only those of omission", and recommended the accompanying DVD release, before concluding: "In either format, however, [Joe Brown's] show-closing 'I’ll See You In My Dreams' is an exquisitely poignant note to end upon".

In 2005, the Concert for George DVD won the Best Long Form Video Grammy. Directed by David Leland, it contains material not found on the album, including "Sit on My Face" and "The Lumberjack Song" by Monty Python, and "Horse to the Water", featuring Jools Holland with vocals by Sam Brown.

iTunes released Concert for George in 2008 with "Horse to the Water" added to the album.

In 2018, Concert for George was released in several packages and formats, including 180-gram vinyl LP records, to celebrate Harrison's 75th birthday. The new vinyl and digital edition included additional tracks not present on both the original and 2018 reissue CD editions: "Sit on My Face" and "The Lumberjack Song" by Monty Python, and "Horse to the Water" by Sam Brown.

== Track listing ==
All songs written by George Harrison, except where noted.

Disc 1
No.	Title	Writer(s)	Performer(s)	Length
1.	"Sarve Shaam"	traditional		3:18
2.	"Your Eyes (Sitar Solo)"	Ravi Shankar	Anoushka Shankar	8:23
3.	"The Inner Light"		Jeff Lynne, Dhani Harrison and Anoushka Shankar	3:02
4.	"Arpan"	Ravi Shankar	Anoushka Shankar	23:02

Disc 2
No.	Title	Writer(s)	Performer(s)	Length
1.	"I Want to Tell You"		Jeff Lynne	2:53
2.	"If I Needed Someone"		Eric Clapton	2:29
3.	"Old Brown Shoe"		Gary Brooker	3:48
4.	"Give Me Love (Give Me Peace on Earth)"		Jeff Lynne	3:29
5.	"Beware of Darkness"		Eric Clapton	4:01
6.	"Here Comes the Sun"		Joe Brown	3:09
7.	"That's the Way It Goes"		Joe Brown	3:40
8.	"Taxman"		Tom Petty and the Heartbreakers	3:11
9.	"I Need You"		Tom Petty and the Heartbreakers	3:00
10.	"Handle with Care"	Harrison, Bob Dylan, Jeff Lynne, Tom Petty, Roy Orbison	Tom Petty and the Heartbreakers with Jeff Lynne and Dhani Harrison	3:27
11.	"Isn't It a Pity"		Eric Clapton and Billy Preston	6:58
12.	"Photograph"	Harrison, Richard Starkey	Ringo Starr	3:57
13.	"Honey Don't"	Carl Perkins	Ringo Starr	3:04
14.	"For You Blue"		Paul McCartney	3:05
15.	"Something"		Paul McCartney and Eric Clapton	4:26
16.	"All Things Must Pass"		Paul McCartney	3:33
17.	"While My Guitar Gently Weeps"		Eric Clapton and Paul McCartney	5:57
18.	"My Sweet Lord"		Billy Preston	5:03
19.	"Wah-Wah"		Eric Clapton and Band	6:06
20.	"I'll See You in My Dreams"	Isham Jones, Gus Kahn	Joe Brown	4:02

== Personnel ==
From Warner Strategic Marketing's 2003 CD release R2 74546

Eric Clapton - musical director

Featuring: Joe Brown, Eric Clapton, Jools Holland and Sam Brown, Jeff Lynne, Paul McCartney, Tom Petty and the Heartbreakers, Billy Preston, Ringo Starr and...

- Dave Bronze - bass
- Gary Brooker - keyboards
- Jim Capaldi - drums
- Ray Cooper - percussion
- Dhani Harrison - guitar
- Jim Horn - alto sax
- Jim Keltner - drums
- Katie Kissoon - backing vocals
- Albert Lee - guitar
- Andy Fairweather Low - guitar
- Marc Mann - Lead guitar
- Tessa Niles - backing vocals
- Tom Scott - tenor sax
- Henry Spinetti - drums
- Chris Stainton - keyboards
- Klaus Voormann - bass

The Heartbreakers:

- Ron Blair - bass guitar
- Mike Campbell - guitar
- Steve Ferrone - drums
- Benmont Tench - keyboards
- Scott Thurston - guitar/harmonica

Arpan

- Composed by Ravi Shankar
- Conducted by Anoushka Shankar

Performed by:

- Anoushka Shankar - sitar
- Sukanya Shankar - vocal-shloka
- M Balanchandar - mridangam
- Vishwa Mohan Bhatt - slide guitar
- Tanmoy Bose - tabla & dholak
- Chandrasekhar - violin
- Eric Clapton - guitar
- Pedro Eustache - wind instruments
- Sunil Gupta - flute
- Anuradha Krishamurthi - vocalist
- Jane Lister - harp
- Gaurav Mazumdar - sitar
- Snehashish Mazumdar - mandolin
- Ramesh Mishra - sarangi
- Pirshanna Thevarajah - percussion
- Kenji Ota - tanpura
- Barry Phillips - cello
- Rajendra Prasanna - shahnai
- Emil Richards - marimba
- Baul Raghuraman - violin
- Partho Sarathy - sarod
- O.S. Arun - vocalist
- Hari Sivanesan - veena
- Sivaskti Sivanesan - veena

Boys' and Girls' Choir
English Chamber Choir
London Metropolitan Orchestra
Strings conducted and arranged by Michael Kamen
