= Karsh Kale =

Musician (born 1974)

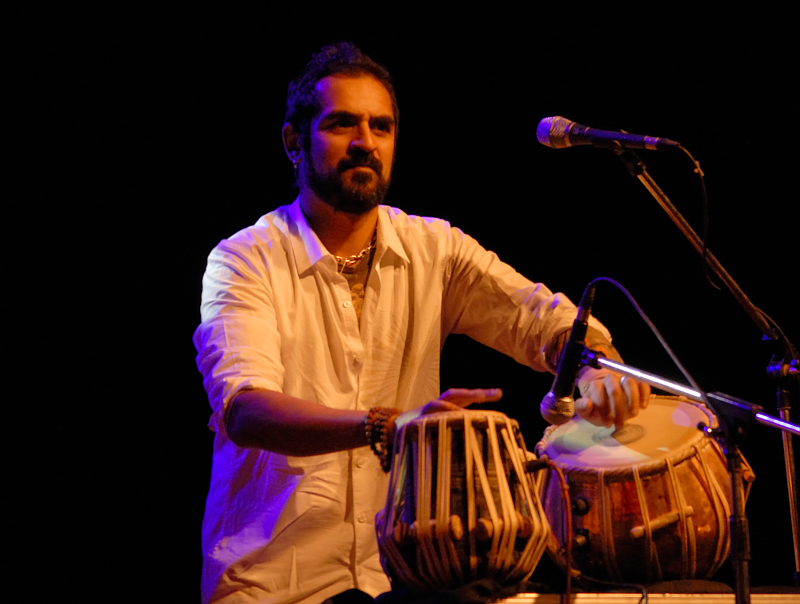
- Karsh Kale performing in 2009

Background information
- Also known as: Karsh Kale
- Born: Utkarsha Kale; 1 November 1974 (age 51); West Bromwich, West Midlands, England
- Genres: Electronic, Indian classical, Indian folk, rock, hip hop, EDM, jazz
- Occupations: Musician, record producer, singer, songwriter, film composer, DJ
- Instruments: Tabla, electronic tabla, drums, vocals, electric guitar, piano, keyboards, bass guitar, cello, santoor
- Years active: 1994–present
- Labels: Six Degrees, Mighty Junn, EMI, Manhattan
- Website: karshkale.com

Karsh Kale (pronounced Kursh Kah-lay, कर्ष काळे in Marathi; born 1 November 1974) is an Indian-American musician and producer who is known primarily for his experimental tabla playing within electronic music contexts. Kale's career has seen him take on roles of an Indian classical tabla player, singer, songwriter, film and TV score composer, and DJ. He is considered a pioneer of the Asian Underground genre, bringing elements of Indian music to Electronica and Dance. His career highlights include touring as the supergroup Tabla Beat Science (with Ustad Zakir Hussain, Bill Laswell, Ustad Sultan Khan et al.), six solo studio records from 1999 (several other record appearances), the seminal 2007 album "Breathing Under Water" with Anoushka Shankar, scoring and production for the 2019 Bollywood smash hit "Gully Boy", curating six acclaimed songs for the Indian Coke Studio in 2012, amongst many others. Kale is also popular for his eclectic collaborations with Sting, Ustad Zakir Hussain, Ustad Sultan Khan, U2, Norah Jones, Yoko Ono, and Herbie Hancock to name a few.

== Biography ==
=== Early life ===
Born as Utkarsh Kale on 1 November 1974 to Indian Marathi speaking immigrants in West Bromwich, UK, Kale was raised in Stony Brook, New York after his parents relocated in 1977.

Kale took an interest in drums and eventually became a tabla player. His father introduced him to a broad range of music, which included traditional Indian music, classical, rock, and even early hip-hop. From this broad range of influences, Kale, who was self-taught, developed his own style, which eventually led to his "electric tabla".

=== Tabla Beat Science ===
In 2000, Bill Laswell founded Tabla Beat Science, inviting Kale, along with Zakir Hussain, Talvin Singh, Trilok Gurtu and Sultan Khan. Together, the group released Tala Matrix that year. The album is considered to be one of the most influential Asian Fusion albums to date, and the group embarked on a tour, of which one of the shows was later released on DVD.

=== 1999–2011 ===
While a Music Production and Performance student at New York University, Kale began playing in bands and working as a session musician. In 1999, Kale began work on his first EP, Classical Science Fiction from India and began hosting bi-weekly "Futureproof" events, which consisted of DJ and electric tabla sets.

These events attracted the attention of San Francisco label Six Degrees Records. Soon after, Kale became the first Indo-American to be signed to a solo recording contract in the United States, a move which was followed by Kale's first full-length album, Realize, in 2001. Realize, often considered as a major milestone in what Kale called "Asian Massive", was followed with 2002's Asian Massive Tour, which also featured Midival Punditz and Cheb i Sabbah, and 2003's Liberation. Zakir Hussain was also featured in the album and in the major attraction of the album "Milan".

Kale's third album, 2006's Broken English, was predominantly set to English lyrics, a shift from his previous albums.

His follow-up Breathing Under Water, released in 2007, was the result of a two-year collaboration with sitar instrumentalist Anoushka Shankar. In 2011, Kale released Cinema, which is influenced by Kale's experiences in composing for Bollywood. He also won GIMA Awards best fusion album for the same, beating A.R. Rahman.

=== 2012–2021 ===
Kale made two appearances in the Indian cult classic television show The Dewarists. In the first one in Season 1 (2011), he produced a Tabla-Electronica track in his signature style, called "Sacred Science", with Baiju Dharmajan, and Njelarathu Harigovindan; and a folk-rock ballad in Season 2 (2012), called "The Minstrel's Tale", with his long time collaborator Papon, and UK-Based Carl Barat of the Libertines.

In 2012, Kale was invited to produce 6 songs for the second season of MTV India's music incubation project, Coke Studio @ MTV. This episode met both popular and critical acclaim, especially for Kale's take on "Kajar Bin Kaare", a classic from his Tabla Beat Science times, done as a tribute to Ustad Sultan Khan.

Kale also hosted Season 2 of MTV Soundtrippin', alongside Nucleya in 2013 for MTV India.

In January 2016, Kale released his fifth solo studio album, "Up" featuring collaborations from his group "Karsh Kale Collectiv". The album features guitarist Blackstratblues/Warren Mendonsa, Kale's long time collaborator flautist Pandit Ajay Prasanna, and vocalists Papon, Benny Dayal, and Monali Thakur, amongst a host of other musicians. Following the release, Kale also did an "Up Live Tour" to promote the album in India across several concerts, featuring visual effects by The Wolves.

Followed by Up, Kale appeared in Red Bull Studio Science in 2017 with a 20-minute talk about his songwriting methods and his electric tabla, and performed a live version of "Up", and his own take on "Unkahi" with the delhi based musician duo Shadow and Light, originally composed by Shadow and Light.

Kale covered "Mad about you" by Sting in 2017.

2019 saw the release of "Infinity" – a 6 track EP which is the result of a collaboration between Kale, and Sarod virtuosos Amaan Ali Bangash, and Ayaan Ali Bangash. The EP features Delhi based neo-classical duo Shadow and Light, and Sarod legend Ustaad Amjad Ali Khan.

In the same year, Kale also put out an ambient electronica EP called "Little Whale" with Ankur Tewari, and Gaurav Raina of the Midival Punditz and an accompanying music video. and a single, "Disappear", with vocalist Tarana Marwah / Komorebi.

Kale was also featured in U2's Eternal Remixes album (2019) for his version of "In the name of love / Pride" dubbed the 100 voices mix. This song also features a music video, and re-penned lyrics that speak about the assassination of Mahatma Gandhi.

After 2020's single "Across the Ocean" and its remixes in 2021, Kale released his sixth solo studio album "Touch", released as two EPs, Touch: 1 and Touch: 2 in May and July 2021 respectively. Entirely conceived and produced in the pandemic, this album sees Kale favour electronic arrangements and only a few collaborations, namely vocalist Malini Awasthi, guitarists Warren Mendonsa and Bhrigu Sahni, and flautist Pandit Ajay Prasanna. Kale described the Tabla as the "spine" of all his tracks in the album. The track "Fist of Fury", is Kale's return to his signature Tabla-heavy electronica tracks, that he has dubbed "Liquid Tabla". A music video of the title track "Touch" was also released on YouTube in June 2021.

Karsh Kale reworked four of the Beatles' songs for the compilation album, "Songs Inspired by the Film – The Beatles and India", released in October 2021. For these collaboration, Kale worked with Anoushka Shankar, Farhan Akhtar, Warren Mendonsa, Monica Dogra, Benny Dayal, and more.

== Other work ==
Kale has composed for crossover and Bollywood films including Chutney Popcorn, Indian Cowboy, Ocean of Pearls, and Pyaar Impossible!. His tracks have also been featured in shows such as HBO's True Blood and Real Time with Bill Maher. Two of his songs from his debut album Realize, were included in as sample music in Windows Vista by Microsoft.

Kale's songwriting credits include songs with Sting and Norah Jones, and has remixed songs by artists including Paula Cole, Yoko Ono, and The Cure. Kale also worked with Midival Punditz on a rescoring of Bruce Lee's Enter the Dragon.

In 2012, Kale was one of a group of music producers selected to take part in MTV India's music incubation project: Coke Studio for its second season. Working with Indian artists including Warren Mendonsa, Monali Thakur, Benny Dayal, Apeksha Dandekar, and more, he produced some of the series most innovative and well-received tracks.

== Discography ==
=== Albums ===
Studio albums

- Realize (2001)
- Liberation (2003)
- Broken English (2006)
- Breathing Under Water (with Anoushka Shankar) (2007)
- Cinema (2010)
- UP (2016)
- Touch (Released as 2 EPs, Touch : 1 and Touch : 2) (2021)

Remix albums

- Redesign: Realize Remixed (2002)

Compilation albums

- 3 Tracks in Asian Massive (2002)
- 3 Tracks in Samaya: A Benefit Album for Cheb I Sabbah (2012)
- 4 Tracks in Songs Inspired by the Film The Beatles and India (2021)

=== With Tabla Beat Science ===
- Tala Matrix (2000)
- Live at Stern Grove Palm Pictures (2003)
- Talaman Soundclash, Live at the Filmore (2004)

=== EPs ===
- Bright Like This (1999)
- Classical Science Fiction from India (2000)
- Play (1999)
- Pause (1999)
- Back Seat Lavni (1999)
- Distance Remixes (2000)
- Manifest Remixes EP (2007)
- Beautiful Remixes EP (2007)
- Coke Studio @ MTV Season 2 (2012)
- Funkcronomic (2016) (with Bill Laswell and Bernie Worrell)
- Little Whale (2019) (with Ankur Tewari, and Gaurav Raina of Midival Punditz)
- Infinity (2019) (with Amaan Ali Bangash and Ayaan Ali Bangash)
- Touch : 1 (2021)
- Touch : 2 (2021)

With Dave Douglas

- Freak In (RCA, 2003)

=== Films ===
- Karthik Calling Karthik (2010)
- Gully Boy (2019)
- Choked (2020)

=== Singles ===
- "Distance" (2001)
- "Liberation Remixes" (2003)
- "Manifest (Kaushik Ambient Mix)" (2006)
- "Manifest Remixes" (2006)
- "Beautiful Remixes" (2007)
- "Sacred Science" (2011) With The Dewarists Season 1, feat. Baiju Dharmajan and Njeralathu Harigovindan
- "A Minstrel's Tale" (2012) With The Dewarists Season 2, feat. Papon and Carl Barat
- "We All Fall" (2014)
- "Up" (2015)
- "Disappear" (2019)
- "Across the Ocean" (2020)
- "Across the Ocean Remixes" (2021)
- "Lovers Remixes" (2021)
