= Traces of You =

Studio album by Anoushka Shankar
- Released: 4 October 2013
- Length: 56:00
- Label: Deutsche Grammophon
- Producer: Nitin Sawhney

Anoushka Shankar chronology
Traveller (2011)	Traces of You (2013)	Home (2015)

Singles from Traces of You
- 1. "Traces of You" Released: 22 July 2013; 2. "The Sun Won't Set" Released: 11 April 2014

Traces of You is the seventh studio album by British-American sitarist Anoushka Shankar. It was released on 4 October 2013 through Deutsche Grammophon. The album, which is Shankar's first release since her 2011 Grammy-nominated album Traveller, was produced by British composer and multi-instrumentalist Nitin Sawhney. Traces of You features vocals by Norah Jones, Shankar's half-sister, on three tracks. In December 2014, the album was nominated for a Grammy Award in the Best World Music Album category.

== Promotion ==
The lead single to promote the album, "Traces of You", was released internationally on 22 July 2013. "People who have gone, are still here, in us. Places we came from, are carried to the places we go," said Shankar about the song.

A music video for the track, which featured Norah Jones, was released onto YouTube on 12 September 2013. It was directed by Shankar's husband, English film director Joe Wright (Pride & Prejudice, Atonement, Anna Karenina).

== Track listing ==
No.	Title	Writer(s)	Length
1.	"The Sun Won't Set" (featuring Norah Jones)	Anoushka Shankar, Nitin Sawhney	3:34
2.	"Flight"	Shankar	3:37
3.	"Indian Summer"	Shankar, Sawhney	4:54
4.	"Maya"	Shankar, Manu Delago	5:05
5.	"Lasya"	Shankar	4:38
6.	"Fathers"	Shankar, Sawhney	2:30
7.	"Metamorphosis"	Shankar, Sawhney	4:57
8.	"In Jyoti's Name"	Shankar	3:33
9.	"Monsoon"	Shankar	3:40
10.	"Traces of You" (featuring Norah Jones)	Shankar, Sawhney	3:45
11.	"River Pulse"	Sawhney	3:04
12.	"Chasing Shadows"	Shankar, Vishwa Mohan Bhatt	8:17
13.	"Unsaid" (featuring Norah Jones)	Shankar, Norah Jones	4:26
Total length:			56:00

== Personnel ==
Credits from Deutsche Grammophon website and the album liner notes:

- Anoushka Shankar – sitar on all; vocals on 7
- Norah Jones – vocals on 1, 10, and 13
- Nitin Sawhney – guitar on 1, 10, and 11; programming on 2, 3, 4, 7, 9. 10, and 11; string arrangement on 2 and 13, piano on 3 and 6; bass guitar on 7 and 10; percussion on 10; ukulele on 10
- Pirashanna Thevarajah – ghatam on 1, 8, 11, and 12; mridangam on 5, 8, and 12; moorsing on 5 and 11; vocals on 5; shaker percussion on 11; kanjira on 12
- Manu Delago – hang on 2, 4, and 5; glockenspiel on 10
- Ian Burdge – cello on 2, 4, 11, and 13
- Bernhard Schimpelsberger – udu on 5
- Kenji Ota – tanpura on 5, 7, 8, 9, and 12
- Anil Narasimha, Sandhya Chandrachood – vocals on 7
- Sanjeev Shankar – shehnai on 7 and 12
- Tanmoy Bose – tabla on 7, 10, and 12
- Aref Durvesh – tabla on 11
- Ravichandra Kulur – bansuri on 12

== Charts ==
Chart (2013)	Peak position
French Albums (SNEP)	190
Spanish Albums (Promusicae)	90
Swiss Albums (Schweizer Hitparade)	77
US Billboard 200	185
US Heatseekers Albums (Billboard)	4
US World Albums (Billboard)	1

== Release history ==
Region	Date	Label	Format(s)
Austria	4 October 2013	Deutsche Grammophon	CD, LP, digital download
Germany	4 October 2013	Deutsche Grammophon	CD, LP, digital download
New Zealand	4 October 2013	Deutsche Grammophon	CD, LP, digital download
Sweden	4 October 2013	Deutsche Grammophon	CD, LP, digital download
France	7 October 2013	Deutsche Grammophon	CD, LP, digital download
United Kingdom	7 October 2013	Deutsche Grammophon	CD, LP, digital download
Italy	8 October 2013	Deutsche Grammophon	CD, LP, digital download
Spain	8 October 2013	Deutsche Grammophon	CD, LP, digital download
Japan	9 October 2013	Deutsche Grammophon	CD, LP, digital download
Australia	11 October 2013	Deutsche Grammophon	CD, LP, digital download
Canada	22 October 2013	Deutsche Grammophon	CD, LP, digital download
United States	22 October 2013	Deutsche Grammophon	CD, LP, digital download
