= The Sun Won't Set =

The Sun Won't Set may refer to:

- The Sun Won't Set (Desperate Housewives)
- The Sun Won't Set, album by Anoushka Shankar
- "The Sun Won't Set", song by Stephen Sondheim from A Little Night Music
- "The Sun Won't Set", song by Anoushka Shankar, composed by Anoushka Shankar / Nitin Sawhney
- "Taiyō wa shizumanai" (太陽は沈まない) song by The Alfee, theme song for the Fuji network drama Shomuni FINAL
