= Inner World =

Studio album by Dalai Lama
- Released: 6 July 2020
- Genres: Spoken word; new-age; easy listening
- Length: 42:02
- Label: Khandro Music
- Producers: Junelle Kunin, Charles Goldstuck, Abraham Kunin

Singles from Inner World
- 1. "Compassion" Released: 8 June 2020; 2. "One of My Favorite Prayers" Released: 29 June 2020

Professional ratings
Review scores
| Source | Rating |
|---|---|
| Clash | 8/10 |
| The Independent | 2/5 |

Inner World is the debut studio album by the 14th Dalai Lama, released under the name Dalai Lama. It was released on the Dalai Lama's 85th birthday, 6 July 2020. It is the first time The Dalai Lama has released an album. (Note: The box set Living Wisdom, published in 2006, included background music and traditional chanting by the 14th Dalai Lama among companion media to a hardcover book.)

The album was inspired by New Zealand musician and Buddhist Junelle Kunin, who in 2015 proposed an album fusing music with mantras and chants. Kunin was turned down when she wrote to The Office of His Holiness the Dalai Lama about her idea, but on a trip to India she handed a letter to an assistant of the Dalai Lama. Her idea was met more positively in person, as Kunin described the Dalai Lama agreeing that "music can help people in a way that he can't". She and her husband, Abraham Kunin, both contributed to the album over the next five years. She later said "The entire purpose of this project is to try to help people. It's not a Buddhist project, it's to help everyday people like myself, even though I am Buddhist. The messages couldn't be more poignant for our current social climate and needs as humanity.".

The album debuted on multiple Billboard Album Charts: #1 Billboard New Age Chart, #4 Top New Artist Album, #8 Billboard World Music, #13 Record Label Independent Album, #14 Current Digital Album, #17 Digital Album, #43 Top New Artist - Consumption, #55 Top Current Album, #98 Billboard Top Album, #125 Top Albums w/TEA

== Track listing ==
Inner World track listing
| No. | Title | Writer(s) | Length |
|---|---|---|---|
| 1. | "One of My Favorite Prayers" | Dalai Lama, Abraham Kunin, Daniel Ryland, Gandhaar Amin | 3:59 |
| 2. | "The Buddha" | Dalai Lama, Abraham Kunin | 4:20 |
| 3. | "Compassion" | Dalai Lama, Abraham Kunin | 3:55 |
| 4. | "Courage" | Dalai Lama, Abraham Kunin, Junelle Kunin | 4:18 |
| 5. | "Ama La" | Dalai Lama, Abraham Kunin, Anoushka Shankar | 5:32 |
| 6. | "Healing" | Dalai Lama, Abraham Kunin | 3:02 |
| 7. | "Wisdom" | Dalai Lama, Abraham Kunin | 3:19 |
| 8. | "Purification" | Dalai Lama, Abraham Kunin, Junelle Kunin | 3:18 |
| 9. | "Protection" | Dalai Lama, Abraham Kunin | 2:51 |
| 10. | "Children" | Dalai Lama, Abraham Kunin | 2:34 |
| 11. | "Humanity" | Dalai Lama, Abraham Kunin, Mahuia Bridgman-Cooper | 4:54 |
| Total length: | | | 42:02 |

== Personnel ==
- Tenzin Gyatso, spoken word

Music

- Abraham Kunin
- Junelle Kunin
- Anoushka Shankar
- Daniel Ryland
- Gandhaar Amin
- Alex Freer
- Jeff Atmajian
- Marika Hodgson
- Stephanie Brown
- Fen Ikner
- Finn Scholes
- Cass Basil
- Guy Harrison
- Russell McNaughton
- John Davis
- Scott Thomas
- Kingsley Melhuish
- Nastasia Wolfgramm
- Mahuia Bridgman-Cooper

Production

- Charles Goldstuck – executive production
- Junelle Kunin – recording, executive production
- Abraham Kunin – recording, composition, production
- Randy Merrill – mastering
- Aaron Nevezie – mixing

== Charts ==
Chart performance for Inner World
| Chart (2020) | Peak position |
|---|---|
| German Albums (Offizielle Top 100) | 88 |
| Swiss Albums (Schweizer Hitparade) | 18 |

== See also ==
- Wake Up! Music Album with His Words and Prayers, a 2015 album by Pope Francis
