= Anoushka (album) =

Studio album by Anoushka Shankar
- Released: 23 October 1998
- Recorded: June – July 1998
- Genre: Indian classical music
- Length: 59:49
- Label: Angel Records
- Producer: Ravi Shankar

Anoushka Shankar chronology
Anoushka (1998)	Anourag (2000)

Professional ratings
Review scores
Source	Rating
AllMusic	4/5 stars

Anoushka is the debut album of British-American sitar player Anoushka Shankar, released in 1998. The pieces begin with a slow introduction of fluid rhythms (alap or aochar) and build in a crescendo to a spirited display of virtuosity with tabla accompaniment. Four of the album's five themes are based on ragas adapted by Ravi Shankar.

== Track listing ==
All songs by Ravi Shankar, except where noted.

1. "Bairagi" – 20:15
2. "Tilak Shyam" – 10:35
3. "Kirwani" – 8:46
4. "Charukeshi" – 7:30
5. "Pratham Prem" (by Anoushka Shankar) – 12:43

== Personnel ==
1. Anoushka Shankar: Sitar, tamboura, vocals
2. Sukanya Shankar: Tamboura
3. Bikram Ghosh: Tabla
4. Arup Chattapadhyay: Tabla
