= Save Our Selves =

US Climate Change organization

Save Our Selves is the name of a group of activists organized to raise awareness of global climate change. They are the organizers of the July 2007 Live Earth concerts.

The group was founded by Kevin Wall, and includes as major partners former United States Vice President Al Gore, the Alliance for Climate Protection, MSN and Control Room, a concert production company producing Live Earth.

== See also ==
- An Inconvenient Truth
- Hurricane Katrina
- Action on climate change
- Kyoto Protocol
- Politics of global warming
