= Traveller (Anoushka Shankar album) =

Studio album by Anoushka Shankar
- Released: 13 October 2011
- Recorded: August 2009 (track 2), September 2010–January 2011
- Genre: Flamenco
- Length: 62:55
- Label: Deutsche Grammophon
- Producer: Javier Limón

Anoushka Shankar chronology
Breathing Under Water (2007)	Traveller (2011)	Traces of You (2013)

Professional ratings
Review scores
Source	Rating
The Daily Telegraph	4/5 stars
The Guardian	4/5 stars
PopMatters	8/10 stars

Traveller is a studio album by British-American sitarist Anoushka Shankar, released in October 2011 through Deutsche Grammophon. The album was produced by Javier Limón.

Traveller received a nomination in the Best World Music Album category at the 2013 Grammy Awards. However, the award went to Anoushka's late father Ravi Shankar (for his album The Living Room Sessions Part 1), and was accepted by Anoushka on his behalf.

== Background ==
Shankar first came across flamenco when she travelled to Spain as a teenager. During that trip, she visited a small flamenco bar and was electrified by different stage performances. Her album Traveller was built around the idea that Spanish flamenco may have its origins in India. "In Indian music, we call it 'spirituality,' and in Spanish music, it's 'passion'. It's really the same thing in both forms, that reaching at the deepest part of the human soul," said Shankar.

To record the album, Shankar travelled to Spain and enlisted the help of flamenco producer and guitarist Javier Limón. During the early studio sessions, they would sit across from each other with their instruments, exploring the musical conversation between them.

== Critical reception ==
Traveller has received generally favourable reviews. In a positive review for South Asian Diaspora, Ashutosh Ravikrishnan cited "the dark masterpiece" as Shankar's best work, saying, "Traveller is hard to ignore; its music captivates you and forces you to feel and think."

== Track listing ==
No.	Title	Writer(s)	Length
1.	"Inside Me"	Javier Limón, Anoushka Shankar	3:19
2.	"Buleria con Ricardo"	Pedro Ricardo Miño, Shankar	6:03
3.	"Krishna"	Shankar	5:50
4.	"Si no puedo verla"	Limón, Shankar	5:15
5.	"Dancing in Madness"	Shankar	4:29
6.	"Boy Meets Girl"	Pepe Habichuela, Shankar	4:56
7.	"Kanya"	Limón, Shankar	4:55
8.	"Traveller"	Shankar	3:41
9.	"Ishq"	Limón, Shankar	4:21
10.	"Casi Uno"	Limón, Shankar	5:26
11.	"Bhairavi"	Shankar	10:26
12.	"Lola's Lullaby"	Shankar	4:14
Total length:			62:55

== Chart performance ==
Traveller has sold 52,000 copies worldwide.

=== Weekly charts ===
Chart (2011)	Peak position
French Albums (SNEP)	144
Spanish Albums (Promusicae)	62
Chart (2012)	Peak position
US Billboard 200	4
US Heatseekers Albums (Billboard)	4
US World Albums (Billboard)	2
Chart (2013)	Peak position
US World Albums (Billboard)	2

== Release history ==
Region	Date	Label	Format(s)
Australia	13 October 2011	Deutsche Grammophon	CD, digital download
Germany	13 October 2011	Deutsche Grammophon	CD, digital download
France	13 October 2011	Deutsche Grammophon	CD, digital download
United Kingdom	13 October 2011	Deutsche Grammophon	CD, digital download
United States	20 March 2012	Deutsche Grammophon	CD, digital download
