= Wake Up! (Pope Francis album) =

Studio album by Pope Francis
- Released: 27 November 2015
- Genres: Christian rock; progressive rock
- Length: 55:19
- Languages: English; Italian; Latin; Portuguese; Spanish
- Label: Believe Digital
- Producers: Don Giulio Neroni; Tony Pagliuca

Singles from Wake Up!
- 1. "Wake Up! Go! Go! Forward!" Released: 26 September 2015

Wake Up! Music Album with His Words and Prayers is a progressive rock album by Pope Francis released on 27 November 2015 on Believe Digital. The album is formed of speeches by Pope Francis recorded in numerous locations worldwide between 2013 and 2015 with accompanying music tracks of prayers and hymns by various Italian artists and producers.

== Production ==
Under the art direction of Don Giulio Neroni, who also curated other albums for Popes John Paul II and Benedict XVI, various Italian artists and producers contributed to the music, including Giorgio Kriegsch, Mite Balduzzi, Giuseppe Dati, Lorenzo Piscopo, the orchestral director Dino Doni, and Tony Pagliuca, former member of Italian progressive rock band Le Orme. The album was released through the Believe Digital label.

== Composition ==
The album sets papal prayers and speeches to pop, rock, and classical music. The lyrics are varyingly Spanish, Portuguese or Italian, although the title track "Wake Up! Go! Go! Forward!" is in English. While most of the music is described by Rolling Stone as "New Age neoclassicism" not unlike the work of Vangelis or Kitaro, "Wake Up! Go! Go! Forward!" is identified as "the most rocking". The inclusion of rock music in Wake Up! stood in contrast to previous music albums which were released by popes John Paul II and Benedict XVI.

== Reception ==
Professional ratings
Aggregate scores
Source	Rating
AnyDecentMusic?	4.1/10
Metacritic	52/100
Review scores
Source	Rating
AllMusic	3/5 stars
The Arts Desk	2/5 stars
Clash	1/10
Consequence of Sound	C
Crack Magazine	3/10
The Daily Telegraph	3/5 stars
Pitchfork	5/10
Rolling Stone	3/5 stars
Under the Radar	4.5/10 stars

Tom Maxwell of Al Jazeera America states "Musically, the album is similar to but more animated than what one would hear during a yoga class or massage session" and that "What might be most noteworthy about Wake Up! is how groundbreaking it is. ... For such a figure [as the pope] to release an album of music at all is scarcely precedented, much less one that incorporates popular musical forms of the last few decades."

Entertainment reporter Chi Chi Izundu on BBC Newsbeat expressed the opinion that some of the album "has the vibe of 80s rock", and another part is "hauntingly beautiful" and that the album is "all in all, a very pleasant listen".

Helen Brown in The Telegraph calls it a "mellow, accessible album" and states "Proceeds go to help refugees at a time when displaced people are struggling to find room at the inn. Whatever your stance on the Catholic Church, or its leader, I suspect Pope Francis has made a good call here. At a time of increasingly inflamed religious emotions, the world could use a little Holy chill out."

== Release ==
The first track released from the album was "Wake Up! Go! Go! Forward!" on 26 September 2015.

== Track listing ==
Wake Up! includes the following tracks.

No.	Title	Speech location and date	Length
1.	"Annuntio Vobis Gaudium Magnum!"	Vatican City on 13 March 2013	6:53
2.	"Salve Regina"	Rio de Janeiro, Brazil on 25 July 2013 and Cagliari, Italy on 22 September 2013	5:17
3.	"Cuidar el planeta"	Rome, Italy on 20 November 2014	4:46
4.	"¿Por qué sufren los niños?"	Manila, Philippines on 18 January 2015	5:20
5.	"Non lasciatevi rubare la speranza!"	Vatican City on 7 June 2013	3:57
6.	"¡La Iglesia no puede ser una ONG!"	Rio de Janeiro, Brazil on 25 July 2013	4:49
7.	"Wake Up! Go! Go! Forward!"	South Korea, 17 August 2014	5:12
8.	"¡La fe es entera, no se licúa!"	Rio de Janeiro, Brazil on 25 July 2013	4:32
9.	"Pace! Fratelli!"	Vatican City on 8 June 2014	5:52
10.	"Santa famiglia di Nazareth"	Vatican City on 27 October 2013	5:10
11.	"Fazei o que ele vos disser!"	Vatican City on 31 May 2013	3:31

== Charts ==
Chart (2015)	Peak position
US Top Christian Albums (Billboard)	50
US Heatseekers Albums (Billboard)	20
US World Albums (Billboard)	4

== See also ==
- Inner World, a 2020 album by the 14th Dalai Lama
