= Live at Carnegie Hall (Anoushka Shankar album) =

Live album by Anoushka Shankar
- Released: 5 December 2001
- Recorded: New York City, October 6, 2000, England, June 8, 2001
- Genre: Indian classical music
- Length: 61:32
- Label: Angel
- Producer: Hans Shankar

Anoushka Shankar chronology
Anourag (2000)	Live at Carnegie Hall (2001)	Rise (2005)

Professional ratings
Review scores
Source	Rating
AllMusic	link

Live at Carnegie Hall is a live album by Anoushka Shankar released in 2001, and recorded at Carnegie Hall in New York and at the Salisbury Festival. The album earned a Grammy nomination for Best World Music Album.

== Track listing ==
All tracks by Anoushka Shankar:

1. "Introduction" – 0:28
2. "Raga Madhuvanti: Alap" – 9:57
3. "Raga Madhuvanti: Gat in Rupak (7-beat)" – 8:36
4. "Raga Desh" – 11:48
5. "Bhupali Tabla Duet" – 9:52
6. "Raga Mishra Piloo" – 18:57

== Personnel ==
1. Anoushka Shankar: Sitar, vocals
2. Bikram Ghosh: Tabla
3. Tanmoy Bose: Tabla
