= A Billion Hands Concert =

2008 concert by Anoushka Shankar and Jethro Tull

- Genre: Progressive Rock.
- Dates: 5 December 2008
- Locations: Mumbai, India
- Founders: Network 18
- Website: Billion Hands Concert

A Billion Hands Concert was a benefit performance held on 5 December 2008 in Mumbai, India, by Anoushka Shankar and Jethro Tull. All proceeds from the concert went to victims of the 2008 Mumbai attacks.

The concert was originally planned as part of a larger tour throughout India by Shankar and Jethro Tull. The Mumbai leg of the tour was originally scheduled for 29 November 2008, three days after the attacks. After they cancelled the concert, the web-based platform A Billion Hands: For a Better Tomorrow, that was founded by Web18's COO Rishi Khiani and supported by Network 18, asked Shankar and Jethro Tull if they would consider holding a benefit concert instead. A Billion Hands Concert took place on 5 December 2008 in Mumbai. Jethro Tull frontman Ian Anderson stated in a press release that, "some people might consider it disrespectful that we are having a concert but hopefully a majority will realise what this is about and what it says." Shankar added that: "as a musician, this is how I speak, how I express the anger within me [...] our entire tour has been changed by these events and even though the structure of the concert may remain the same, emotionally perhaps we are saying a lot more." Farhad Wadia, CEO of E 18, stated in response that: "We are very grateful to both Jethro Tull and Ms. Shankar for agreeing to perform at this concert, in spite of the terror attacks and at their splendid contribution towards the victims of the horrific attacks in Mumbai. Though it's a much abused thought, this truly is a reflection of Mumbai's strength and character and its willingness to forge ahead. It's important that we use this platform to spread the word of peace and harmony."
