= Andheri Sports Complex =

Multi-purpose facility

Coordinates: 19.129407°N 72.835295°E

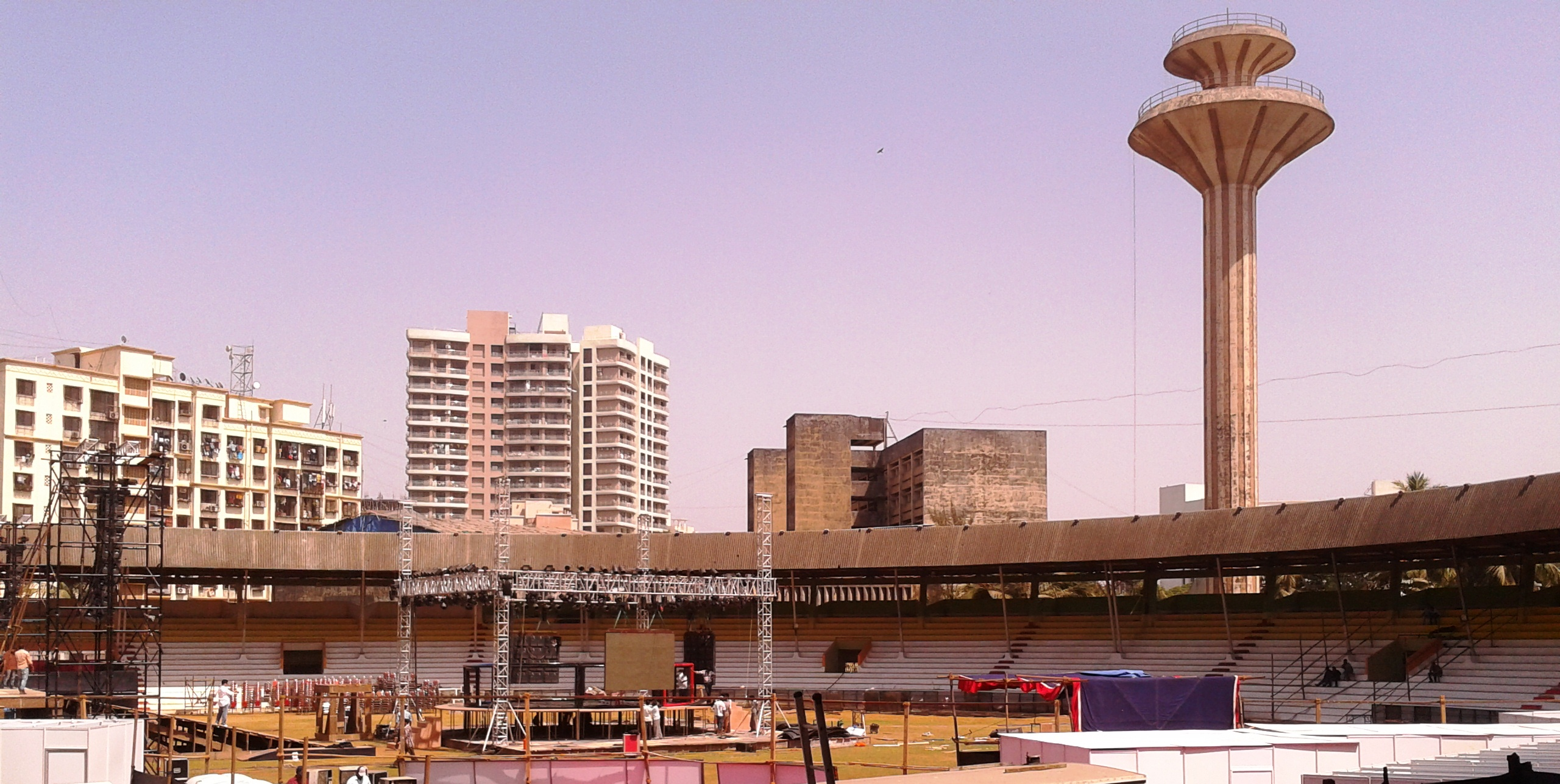
- Interactive map of Andheri Sports Complex
- Location: Veera Desai Road, Andheri West, Mumbai, 400053 India
- Owner: Brihanmumbai Municipal Corporation
- Capacity: 20,000

Construction
- Opened: 1988
- Cost: 30 crore rupees

Tenant
- Mumbai City FC

The Andheri Sports Complex also known as Shahaji Raje Krida Sankul is a multi-purpose facility located on Veera Desai Road in Andheri West, Mumbai, India. It was built in 1988 at ₹30 crore for schools that lacked the necessary infrastructure to hold sports meets. The complex is used for both national level sports tournaments like squash, boxing, tennis and karate. The sports complex has an olympic size swimming pool and a diving pool with 4 diving levels. In 2016, it was redeveloped to include a modern football stadium in accordance with FIFA guidelines and known as Mumbai Football Arena.

== Overview ==
The Brihanmumbai Municipal Corporation opened the World Cup cricket gallery for public viewing in January 2012. The gallery displays statues of the Indian players who were part of the teams that won the Cricket World Cups for India in 1983 and 2011. The gallery also showcases memorabilia like cricket kits, photographs and cricket bats bearing autographs of prominent players since the World Cup event started in 1975. The gallery was inaugurated by legendary cricketer Sunil Gavaskar.

A number of Bollywood films have been shot in the complex and its stadium has been used for commercial entertainment programmes like the Star Screen Awards, pop music concerts like those of Michael Jackson, who performed here on 1 November 1996 as part of his HIStory World Tour in front of 65,000 people. Bon Jovi also performed to a sold-out crowd on their 1995 These Days Tour. Charity organizations also make use of the center. Actor Salman Khan performed at a charity event at the center in October to raise money for the victims of the 2008 Bihar flood.

A football stadium called Mumbai Football Arena is the project which has been completed in time for the FIFA Under-17 World Cup in 2017 The stadium hosted a celebrity charity match, termed as "Celebrity Classico 2016" on 4 June 2016. It took place at the Mumbai Football Arena, Andheri Sports Complex, to generate funds for charitable initiatives in which Virat Kohli and Abhishek Bachchan are involved. Bachchan didn't play in the match due to back injury and his team was led by Ranbir Kapoor. The match ended in a 2–2 draw.

The Brihanmumbai Municipal Corporation has decided to keep the ground only for sports centric events. They have started work on the turf towards creating a football stadium. The stadium will have a capacity of 18,000 seats.

The arena also was the venue of the Swedish rock band Europe (band) kicked off their Out of This World tour on November 26, 1988

== Gallery ==
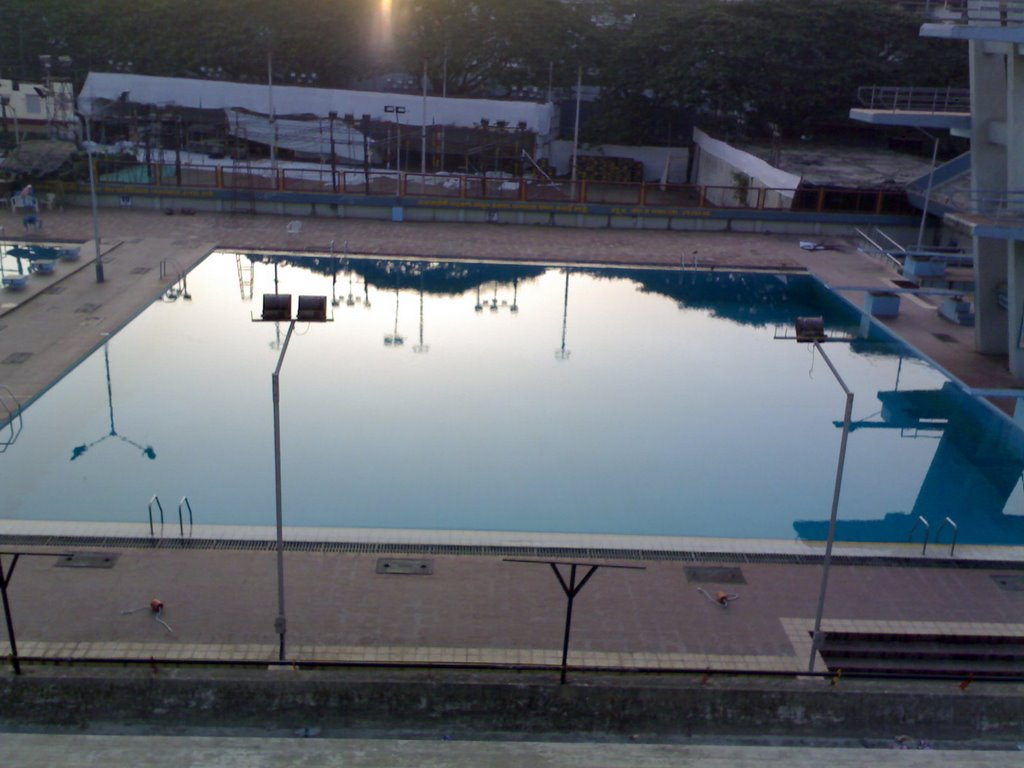
Andheri Sports Complex Diving Pool

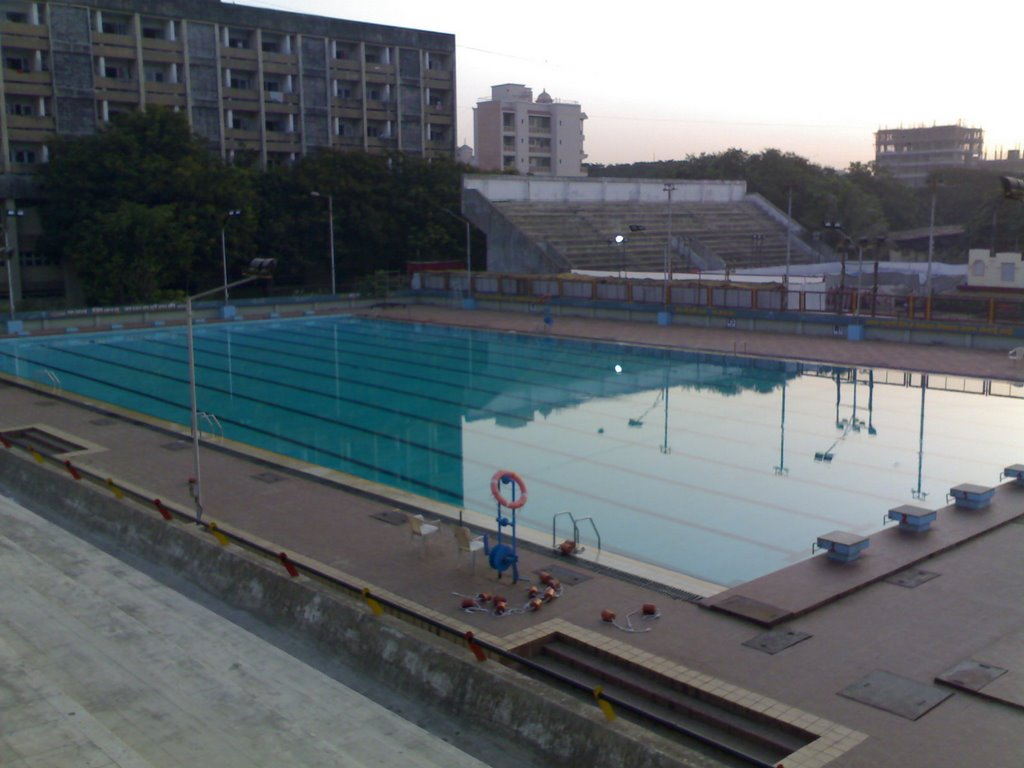
Andheri Sports Complex Olympic Size Swimming pool

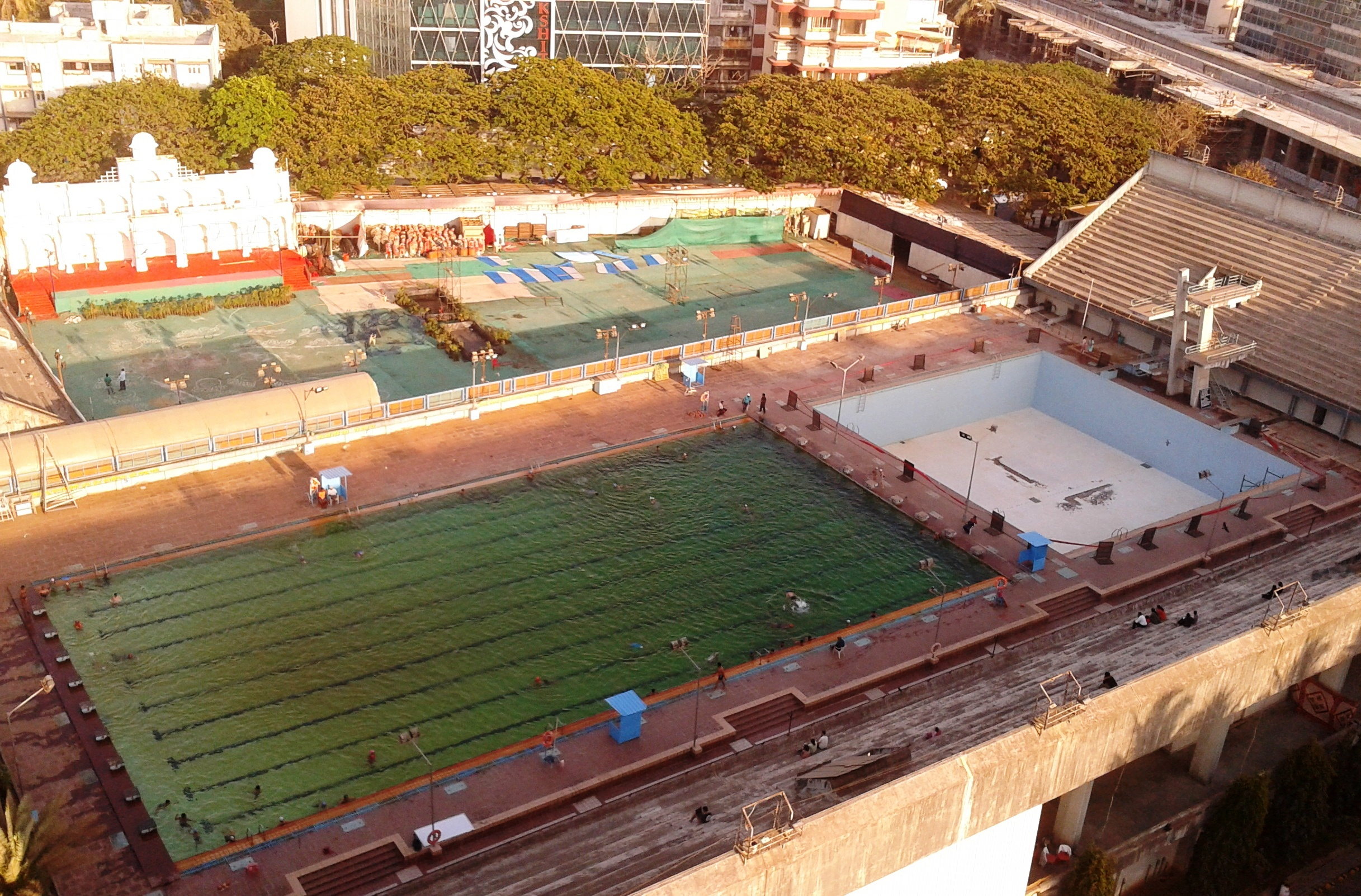
Andheri Sports Complex Swimming Pool

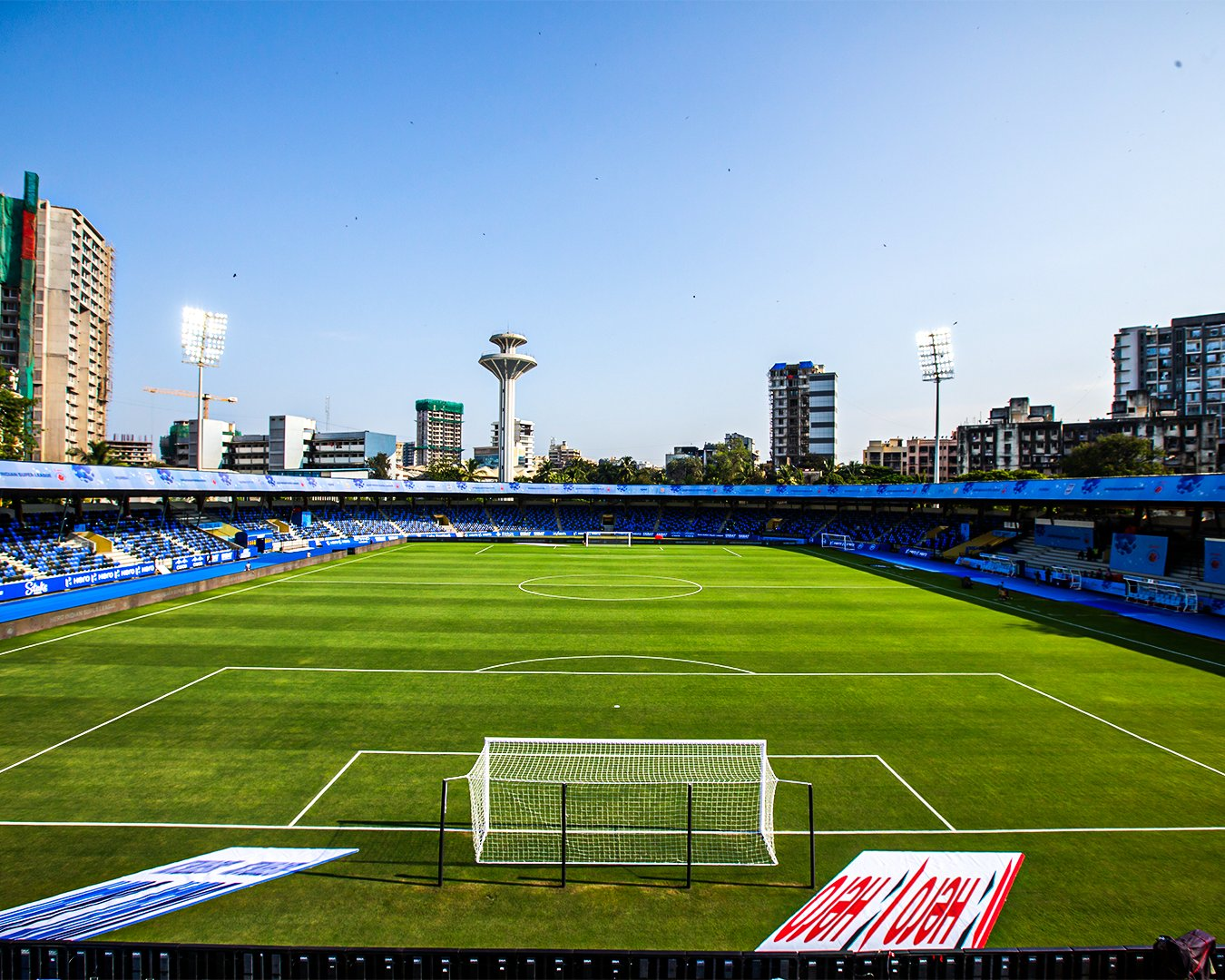
Mumbai Football Arena at the Andheri sports complex stadium
