= Veera Desai Road =

Geographic location near Mumbai, India

Veera Desai Road is a public road in Andheri, one of the largest of Mumbai's suburbs in the state of Maharashtra, India.

The road was temporarily closed for renovation of a bridge in February 2026.

It is also linked to some famous landmarks of Andheri like Andheri Recreation Club, Andheri Sports Complex, where many national level sports tournaments are held, Garden Court restaurant, Peninsula Business Park, Sony Mony Electronics, Sardar Patel College of Engineering (SPCE), S.P. Jain Institute of Management and Research and Bhavan's College.

There are some old housing colonies belonging to bank of India employees, these are Pallavi, Ajanta, Aradhana, Sanmaan, Om Pushpanjalietc. Veera Desai Road has been one of the better neighbourhoods to live in Mumbai. In recent years it has seen exponential developments resulting in a healthy blend of Residential apartments housing Bank and Govt employees alongside the new and swanky Offices in modern office complex.

Veera Desai Road was originally constructed and maintained by a stone quarry named Veera Desai & Company in the year 1954. There was no population in the area besides people working in the quarry. One of the partners named Govindji Vasanji Desai lived on site among the other partners named Shyamji Dahyabhai Veera and Vallabhji Dahyabhai Veera. The road was later taken over by Bombay Municipality to develop and then officially named as Veera Desai Road.

Some years back this area also saw the construction of an Olympic size Swimming pool and a giant outdoor tournament stadium. A major part of Veera Desai road has grown over the last 40 years by reclaiming land from the then backwaters of Mumbai.

Mahalakshmi Society and MVM Schools are one of the oldest known places to all—its entrance begins with the Andheri Sports Complex. The sports complex is famous for various international events including Michael Jackson, Jon Bon Jovi and World Wrestling Federation (WWF) matches.
