= Anoushka Shankar =

British-American musician (born 1981)

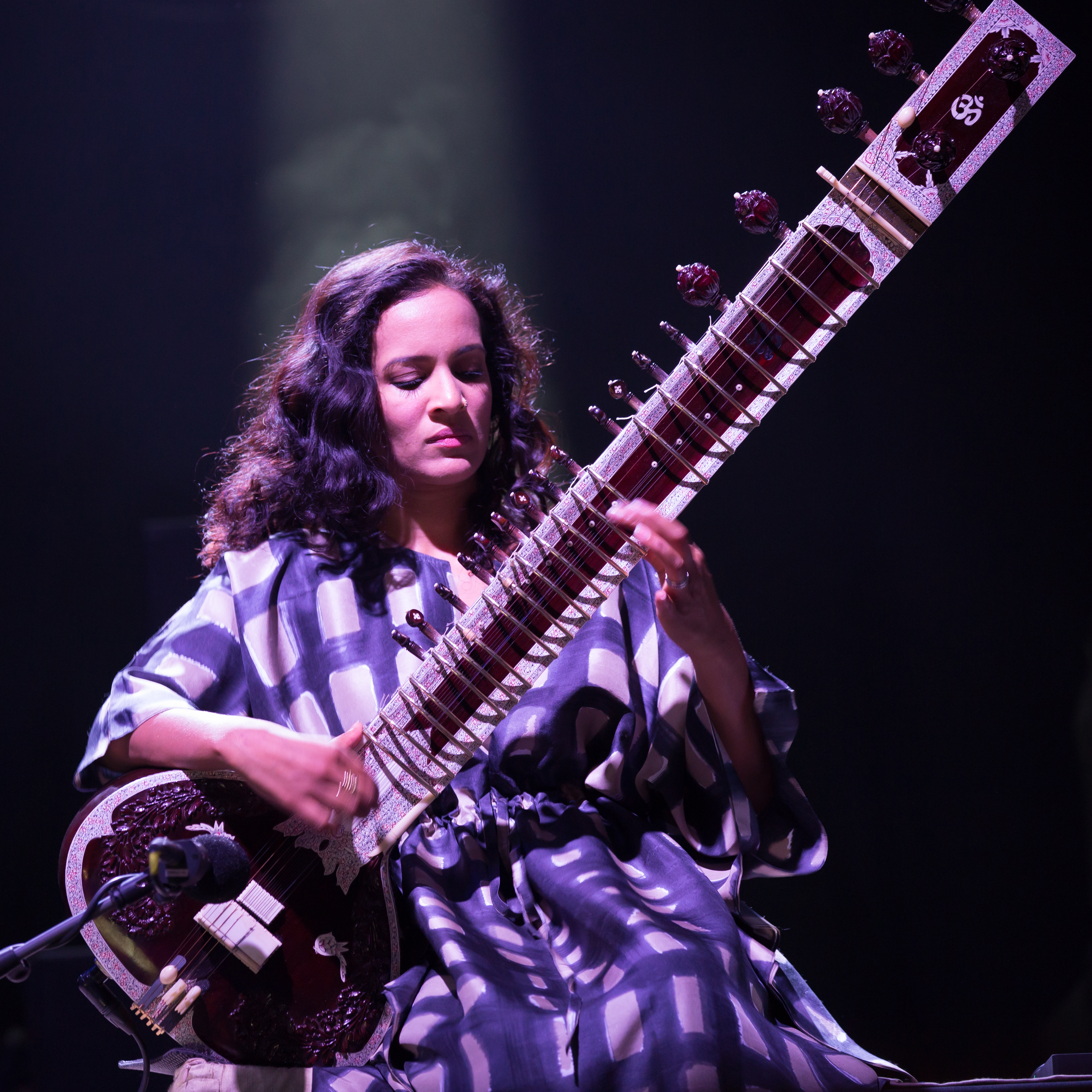
- Shankar at the Rudolstadt-Festival 2016
- Born: Anoushka Hemangini Shankar; 9 June 1981 (age 45); London, England
- Citizenship: United Kingdom; United States
- Occupations: Sitarist; composer; actress
- Spouse: Joe Wright (m. 2010; div. 2019)
- Children: 2
- Father: Ravi Shankar
- Relatives: Norah Jones (half-sister); Shubhendra Shankar (half-brother)
- Musical career
- Origin: London, England
- Genres: Indian classical; crossover; world music
- Instruments: Vocals; sitar; piano; tanpura
- Years active: 1995–present
- Labels: Angel, Deutsche Grammophon, Mercury KX
- Website: anoushkashankar.com

Anoushka Hemangini Shankar (Bengali pronunciation: [onuʃka ʃɔŋkor]; born 9 June 1981) is a British-American sitar player and musician, as well as an occasional writer and actress. She performs across multiple genres and styles—classical and contemporary, acoustic and electronic. In addition to releasing seven solo studio albums beginning with Anoushka (1998), she has also worked alongside a wide variety of musicians, including Karsh Kale on the full-length collaboration Breathing Under Water (2007) and her father Ravi Shankar. She has received fourteen Grammy Awards nominations and was the first musician of Indian origin to perform live and to serve as a presenter at the ceremony.

== Early life ==
Anoushka Shankar was born in London, and her childhood was divided between London and Delhi. She is the daughter of Tamil mother Sukanya Rajan and Bengali father and sitar maestro Ravi Shankar, who was 61 when she was born. Through her father, she is also the half-sister of American singer Norah Jones (born Geetali Norah Shankar) and Shubhendra "Shubho" Shankar, who died in 1992.

As a teenager, Shankar lived in Encinitas, California, and attended San Dieguito High School Academy. A 1999 honors graduate and homecoming queen, she pursued a career in music rather than attending college.

== Career ==
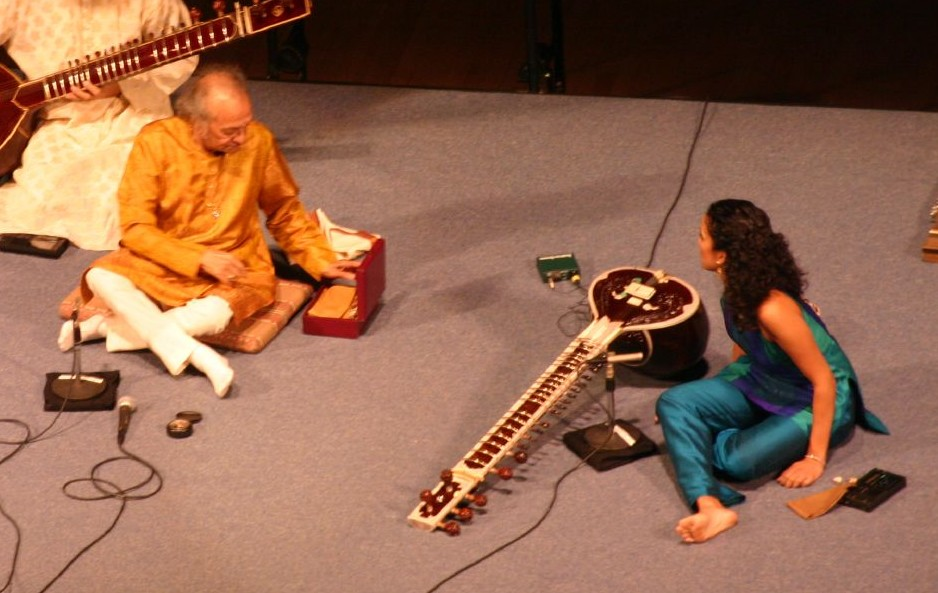
Anoushka and Ravi Shankar in concert, 2005

Shankar began training on the sitar with one of her father's disciples, Gaurav Mazumdar, at the age of eight. As part of her training, she began accompanying her father on the tanpura at his performances from the age of ten. She gave her first public sitar performance on 27 February 1995, aged 13, at Siri Fort in New Delhi as part of her father's 75th birthday celebration concert. For this solo debut, she was accompanied by tabla maestro Zakir Hussain. Her first experience in the recording studio came that same year when Angel Records released a special four-CD box set called In Celebration, to mark her father's birthday. By the age of 14, she was accompanying her father at concerts around the world. At 15, she assisted her father on the landmark album Chants of India, produced by George Harrison. Under both their guidance, she was in charge of notation and eventually of conducting the performers who took part in the recording. After this experience, the heads of Angel Records came to her parents' home to ask to sign her, and Shankar signed her first exclusive recording contract with Angel/EMI when she was 16.

She released her first album, Anoushka, in 1998, followed by Anourag in 2000. In 1999 Shankar graduated from high school with honours, but decided against university in favour of touring as a solo artist. Both Shankar and her half-sister Norah Jones were nominated for Grammy awards in 2003, when Shankar became the youngest nominee in the World Music category for her third album, Live at Carnegie Hall.

Having released three albums of Indian classical music, Shankar took several years away from recording and focused her energy on establishing herself as a solo concert performer outside of her father's ensemble. In that time, she toured worldwide, playing an average of 50–60 concerts per year. 2005 brought the release of her fourth album, RISE, her first self-produced, self-composed, non-classical album, earning her another Grammy nomination in the Best Contemporary World Music category. In February 2006, she became the first Indian to play at the Grammy Awards, playing material from RISE.

Shankar, in collaboration with Indian producer, composer and musician Karsh Kale, released Breathing Under Water on 28 August 2007. It is a mix of classical sitar and electronica beats and melodies. Notable guest vocals included her half-sister Norah Jones, Sting, and her father, who performed a sitar duet with her.

In 2011, Shankar signed with record label Deutsche Grammophon as an exclusive artist. This marked the beginning of a prolific recording and creative period for Shankar, during which time she continued to refine the sitar sound and musical ideas she had become known for. She earned a third Grammy Award nomination in 2013 for Traveller, an exploration of the shared history between flamenco and Indian classical music, which was produced by Javier Limón and featured artists such as Buika, Pepe Habichuela and Duquende. As Shankar had begun to do with RISE, she created a specially handpicked ensemble of musicians with whom to perform this cross-genre music, and played more than a hundred concerts worldwide in support of Traveller. In 2013, she released a personal album called Traces of You, which was released several months after the death of her father. Produced by Nitin Sawhney, and featuring her half-sister Norah Jones as the sole vocal performer, Traces of You earned Shankar a fourth Grammy nomination in the World Music category. In July 2015, Shankar released Home, her first purely classical album of Indian ragas. Self-composed and produced, Home was recorded over a week in October 2014 in Shankar's new, purpose-built home-studio.

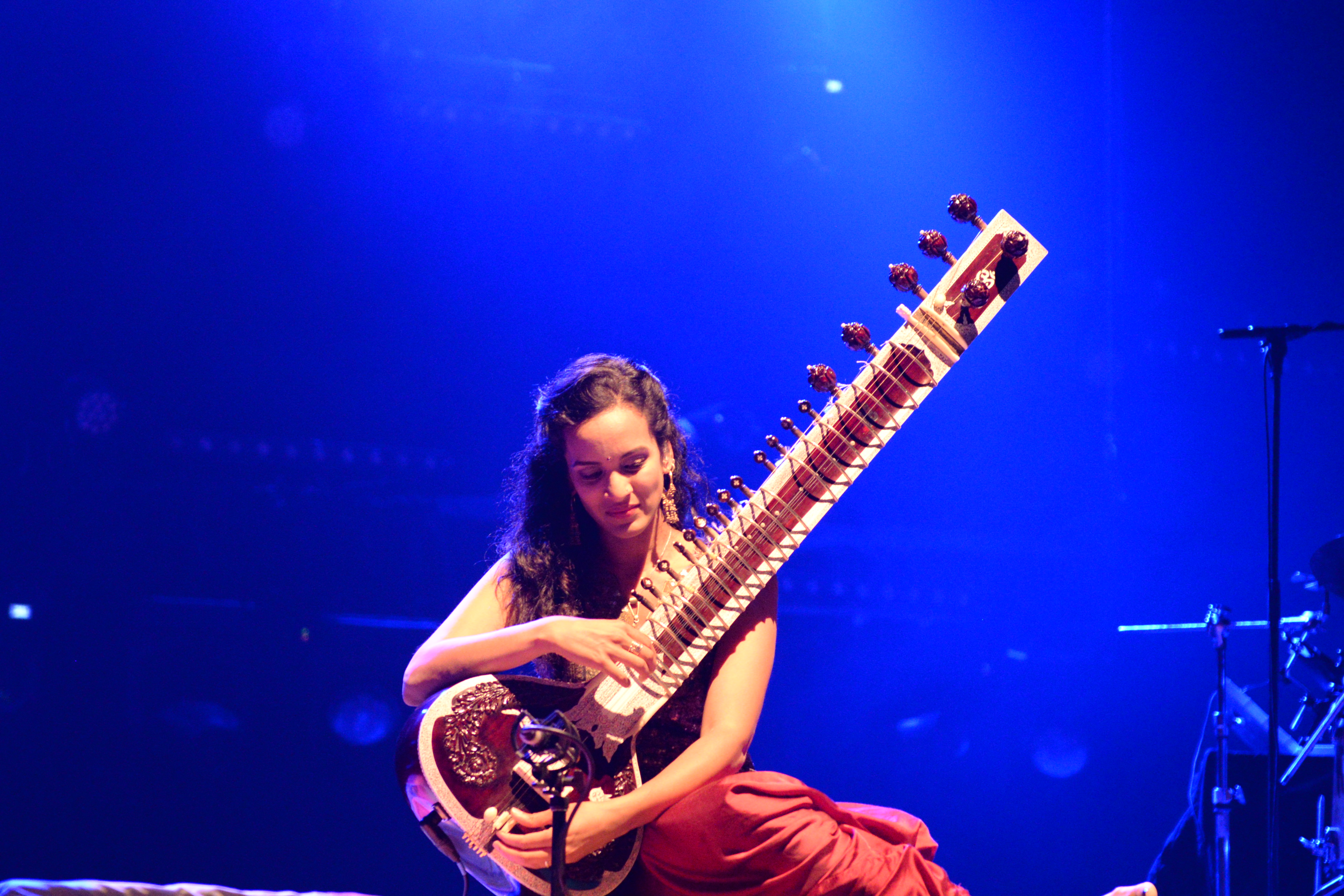
Anoushka Shankar in Lorient Interceltic Festival in 2014

Following Home, Shankar released Land of Gold (2016) – her fourth album with Deutsche Grammophon. The release featured different types of contributions – from the vocal of MIA and Alev Lenz, to the monologue of "Remain the Sea" by veteran British actress Vanessa Redgrave. There is also a strong cinematic influence in the videos, lent by the production of film director Joe Wright. Land of Gold remixes came out in the same year with remixes by Mowgli, Karsh Kale, Matt Robertson, Grain and East London-based collective Shiva Soundsystem.

Anoushka discusses her awesome work around the UK-India Year Of Culture, and visiting Buckingham Palace in a BBC Radio interview with Ashanti Omkar on 2 April 2017.

In 2019, came the compilation Reflections, a 20-year retrospective album that revisits the best of Shankar's cross-cultural back catalogue with Deutsche Grammophon, including many of her previous collaborations with fellow artists and producers.

The release of Love Letters in 2020 marked a different direction for Shankar. The co-produced EP is a compilation of songs written across 2018–19 and released on her new record label, Mercury KX. Several guest musicians feature on the EP, including singer and co-producer Alev Lenz, twin sister vocal duo Ibeyi, singer and cellist Ayanna Witter-Johnson, Indian singer Shilpa Rao, Brooklyn-based mastering engineer Heba Kadry (Björk, Slowdive) and British audio mastering engineer Mandy Parnell (Aphex Twin, The XX).

Shankar regularly collaborates with electronic music producer Gold Panda, percussionist Manu Delago and the Britten Sinfonia strings, all of which appeared, including Shankar, at the 2020 BBC Proms at the Royal Albert Hall.

Throughout her career, Shankar has made many guest appearances on recordings by other artists, among them Sting, Lenny Kravitz, Thievery Corporation and Nitin Sawhney.

In 2010, she collaborated with Jazz legend Herbie Hancock, on his album The Imagine Project, alongside Pink, India.Arie, Jeff Beck, John Legend, Chaka Khan, The Chieftains, Wayne Shorter and Dave Matthews. The project was also filmed for a documentary accompanying the release and showing him working with the artists who collaborated on the project.

In 2005, she featured on the track "Rebirth" by Indian fusion group MIDIval Punditz. In 2012, the album Area 52 by Rodrigo & Gabriela featured a guest appearance from Shankar's sitar improvisation. She performed the Raga Piloo with violinist Patricia Kopatchinskaja during a concert in Konzerthaus Berlin, Germany in April 2016; the song was originally composed, performed and recorded by Ravi Shankar as a duet with Yehudi Menuhin on the album West Meets East, Volume 2 in 1968.

More recently, she has played on the track "Ama La" on the Dalai Lama's first music album, Inner World, which was released in July 2020 on his 85th birthday.

Shortly afterwards, she appeared on Peradam, the third and final instalment of album trilogy Perfect Vision by Patti Smith and Soundwalk Collective alongside Charlotte Gainsbourg, and Tenzin Choegyal; she also collaborated with Grammy-nominated Deva Premal on the song "Prabhujee", released in November 2020.

On 13 November 2020, Shankar was featured on "Stop Crying Your Heart Out" as part of the BBC Radio 2's Allstars' Children in Need charity single. The single debuted at number 7 on the Official UK Singles Chart and number 1 on both the Official UK Singles Sales Chart and the Official UK Singles Download Chart.

On February 8, 2026 Shankar performed in a concert with Arijit Singh at Netaji Indoor Stadium in Kolkata. It was significant for two reasons - firstly, they performed Ravi Shankar's rarely heard Bengali song and secondly, it was Arijit Singh's first public performance since he announced his exit from playback singing on January 27, 2026.

On March 7, 2026 she performed as a guest artist with Gorillaz (along with Asha Puthli and Black Thought) on Saturday Night Live.

=== Classical sitar ===
Shankar has continued to tour and perform as a classical sitarist, both within purely Indian classical ensembles but also as a soloist championing her father's compositions with the world's leading orchestras including the London Symphony Orchestra, New York Philharmonic, Berliner Philharmoniker, MDR Sinfonieorchester, Metropole Orkest and Lucerne Symphony Orchestra.

Shankar is the sole performer of Ravi Shankar's First and Second Concertos for Sitar and Orchestra since his death, performing multiple times under the leadership of esteemed conductors such as Zubin Mehta, Jules Buckley, Kristjan Järvi, and Jakob Hrusa. In January 2009, she was the sitar soloist alongside the Orpheus Chamber Orchestra premiering her father's Third Concerto for Sitar and Orchestra, and in July 2010 she premiered Ravi Shankar's first symphony for sitar and orchestra with the London Philharmonic Orchestra at London's Royal Festival Hall.

On 4 November 2012, Shankar performed with father Ravi during his final concert, at the Terrace Theater in Long Beach, California. He died five weeks later in San Diego.

She has also performed in duets with artists such as violinist Joshua Bell, in a sitar-cello duet with Mstislav Rostropovich, and with flutist Jean-Pierre Rampal, playing both sitar and piano.

=== Film scoring ===
Shankar took her first steps into scoring with a Bengali lullaby composed for director Joe Wright's Anna Karenina (2012), starring Keira Knightley, Jude Law and Tannishtha Chatterjee.

Shankar's progression into composition for films led her to score the British Film Institute's restoration of a rare Indian silent Shiraz: A Romance of India (original 1928, scored in 2017). She also performed the composition live at screenings of the movie that premiered at 2017's London Film Festival Archive Gala and then appeared at the global film festival We Are One on 2 June 2020.

In the same year (2017), she co-wrote and performed on the end-title song "Gain the Ocean" for the Judi Dench-starred British-American biographical drama Victoria & Abdul directed by Stephen Frears.

More recently, she co-composed the score to Mira Nair's (Monsoon Wedding, Vanity Fair, The Namesake) BBC six-part series A Suitable Boy (2020); based on Vikram Seth's classic novel of the same title, the show developed by Andrew Davies (Bridget Jones's Diary, War & Peace, Les Misérables) stars Tabu, Tanya Maniktala and Ishaan Khatter.

=== Acting, writing and narrating ===
Shankar has also ventured into acting (Dance Like a Man, 2004) and writing. She wrote a biography of her father, Bapi: The Love of My Life, in 2002 and has contributed to various books. As a columnist, she wrote monthly columns for India's First City Magazine for three years, and spent one year as a weekly columnist for India's second-largest newspaper, the Hindustan Times.

She narrated Stolen Innocence: India's Untold Story of Human Trafficking, a 2017 documentary by filmmakers Chris Davis, Casey Allred and Lindsay Daniels, telling the true stories of young women who escaped from sex slavery in India and Nepal.

=== Benefit concerts ===
Over the span of her musical career, Shankar has frequently been invited to perform for benefit concerts around the world.

In 2000, she shared the stage with Madonna and Bryan Adams at the Summer's Tibetan Peace Garden Benefit concert organised in London by Sting's wife, Trudie Styler; on 29 November 2002, Shankar was the featured performer of the "Indian" half of the Concert for George, a posthumous tribute to the life and music of George Harrison, held at the Royal Albert Hall in London. She opened the show by playing a solo sitar instrumental titled "Your Eyes". Also on the sitar, she performed George Harrison's "The Inner Light" with Jeff Lynne. Lastly, she conducted a new composition, Arpan, written by her father. The composition featured Eric Clapton playing acoustic guitar, and a full orchestra of Indian and Western musicians. The concert was modelled after Ravi Shankar's benefit concert with Harrison, the 1971 Concert for Bangladesh.

Also in 2002, she performed alongside Patti Labelle, Elton John, Nina Simone and others for Rock for the Rainforest, the benefit concert organized by Sting and Trudie Styler at Carnegie Hall.

Shankar was invited by Richard Gere and Philip Glass to perform in a concert at Avery Fisher Hall in 2003 in aid of the Healing the Divide: A Concert for Peace and Reconciliation.

Shankar and Jethro Tull postponed a concert scheduled for 29 November 2008 in Mumbai after the 2008 Mumbai attacks. They reorganised the performance as A Billion Hands Concert, a benefit performance for victims of the attacks, and held it on 5 December 2008.

In 2016, Shankar helped gather names and signed a letter to the Guardian for a call for action to help Syrian refugees.

In February 2018, she read a poem as part of Letters Live for Help Refugees, alongside other performers such as Gemma Arterton, Andrew Scott, Jade Anouka, Cara Theobold, Florence Welch, Chiwetel Ejiofor, and Joely Richardson, among many others.

In July 2018, Shankar embarked on a short US tour of Land of Gold to help raise funds for the nonprofit organization Help Refugees.

== Awards and honours ==
- Woman of the Year awarded on International Women's Day 2003 in India.
- Named as one of 20 Asian Heroes by the Asia edition of Time in 2004.
- In 2003, she received her first Grammy Nomination in the Best Global Music Album category for her third-album, Live at Carnegie Hall. She was the youngest-ever nominee in this category.
- In 2004, she received a National Film Award nomination for Best Supporting actress in the film Dance Like A Man in 2004.
- In 2006, she was nominated for another Grammy, in the Best Contemporary World Music Album category for her fourth album Rise.
- In 2012, she won Best Artist in the Songlines Music Award for her album Traveller.
- In 2013, she was nominated for her third Grammy, in the Best Global Music Album category for her album Traveller.
- In 2015, she was nominated for a fourth Grammy in the Best Global Music Album category for her album Traces of You.
- In 2016, she was nominated for a fifth Grammy in the Best Global Music Album category for her album Home.
- In 2017, she was nominated for a sixth Grammy in the Best Global Music Album category for her album Land of Gold.
- In 2017, she won the Eastern Eye Arts, Culture & Theatre Awards (ACTA) Award for Music for outstanding achievements in the Indian classical and progressive world music scenes.
- Asteroid 292872 Anoushankar, discovered by Italian amateur astronomer Silvano Casulli, was named in her honor. The official naming citation was published by the Minor Planet Center on 12 January 2017 (M.P.C. 103028).
- In 2018, she won the 3rd Eastern Eye Arts, Culture & Theatre Awards (ACTA) for the score to 1928 BFI film Shiraz.
- In November 2020, she was nominated for the RTS (Royal Television Society) Craft & Design Awards 2020 for the music she and Alex Heffes composed for A Suitable Boy, A Lookout Point Production for BBC One.
- In July 2021, she received the Honorary Membership of the Royal Academy of Music (Hon RAM).
- In 2021, she was nominated for a seventh Grammy in the Best Global Music Album category for her album Love Letters.
- In 2021, she was co-nominated for an Ivor Novello Award for A Suitable Boy Score.
- In 2023, she became the inaugural Visiting Professor of Music Business at the University of Oxford's Faculty of Music.
- In 2023, she received Grammy nominations in both Global Music categories, her eighth and ninth. The first was in the category Best Global Music Album for her album Between Us with the Metropole Orkest conducted by Jules Buckley and featuring Manu Delago. The second was in the category Best Global Music Performance for Udhero Na by Arooj Aftab featuring Anoushka Shankar.
- In June 2024, the University of Oxford awarded her an Honorary Doctor of Music degree for her contributions to the field of music.
- In 2024, she received her tenth, eleventh, and twelfth Grammy nominations. The first was for Chapter II: How Dark it is Before Dawn in the Best New Age, Ambient, or Chant Album category; the second for Jacob Collier's "A Rock Somewhere" in the Best Global Music Performance category and the third for the album Opus in the Best New Age, Ambient, or Chant Album category.
- In 2025, she received her thirteenth Grammy Awards nomination for the track "Daybreak" in the Best Global Music Performance category and her fourteenth nomination for the album Chapter III: We Return to Light in the Best Global Music Album category.
- In 2026, she earned two Grammy nominations Best Global Music Album for Chapter III: We Return to Light and Best Global Music Performance for “Daybreak.”

== Activism ==
Shankar is an activist working with multiple causes and charitable organisations, in particular supporting women and refugees; she is also an advocate for animal rights.

One Billion Rising

In 2013, responding to the horrific gang-rape of a young girl in Delhi, whom the Indian media referred to as Nirbhaya, Shankar threw her weight behind an online campaign One Billion Rising on Change.org, demanding an end to crime against women. As part of the campaign, she released a video in which she revealed she had been sexually abused for many years as a child.

UNHCR – The UN Refugee Agency

In 2018, she joined musicians, actors and artists such as Patrick Stewart, Peter Capaldi, Vivienne Westwood, Anish Kapoor, The Kaiser Chiefs and many others in a call to urge MPs to attend the Refugees Family Reunion Bill and ensure refugee families torn apart by war and conflict are reunited.

Help Refugees

Shankar is one of the faces of the Help Refugees campaign to raise funds and awareness for the refugee crisis worldwide.

The F-List

In 2020, Shankar was announced as the inaugural President of the F-List: a UK database created to help bridge the gender gap in music.

Pin Your Thanks

In 2020, Shankar designed a pin for the "Pin Your Thanks" initiative that supports the National Health Service (NHS) charities during the COVID-19 pandemic in the United Kingdom.

The Walk

Shankar is an ambassador for The Walk, an international artistic project in support of refugees.

UN World Food Programme

In 2007, the UN World Food Programme appointed Shankar as spokesperson to raise awareness about the issues of hunger and malnutrition, especially among children, in India.

PETA

Shankar and her father, also a supporter of animal rights, appeared in a 30-second public-service announcement against animal suffering for People for the Ethical Treatment of Animals (PETA).

Artists4Ceasfire

In October 2023, Shankar signed the Artists4Ceasefire open letter to Joe Biden, President of the United States, calling for a ceasefire in the Israeli bombardment of Gaza.

== Personal life ==
In 2010, she married British director Joe Wright. They have two sons (born 2011 and 2015). They separated in December 2017 after discovering her husband's infidelity and finalised their divorce in September 2019. Shankar lives in London with her sons.

== Discography ==
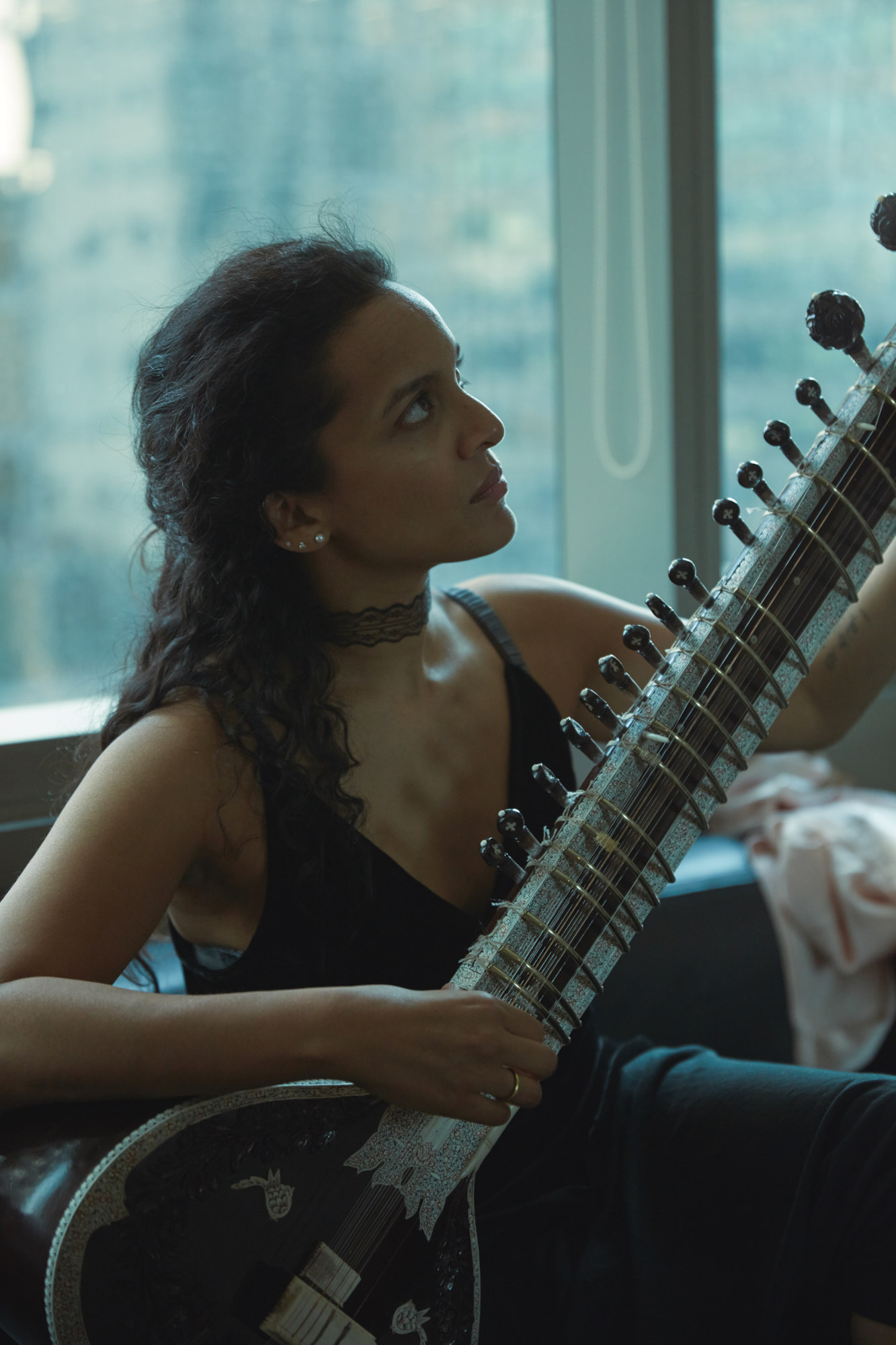
Shankar in 2020

=== Studio albums ===
Title	Album details	Peak chart positions					
Title	Album details	FRA	SPA	SWI	US	US Heat.	US World
Anoushka	Released: 23 October 1998; Label: Angel Records	—	—	—	—	—	—
Anourag	Released: 15 August 2000; Label: Angel Records	—	—	—	—	—	—
Rise	Released: 27 September 2005; Label: Angel Records	—	—	—	—	29	2
Breathing Under Water (with Karsh Kale)	Released: 28 August 2007; Label: Manhattan	177	—	—	—	40	6
Traveller	Released: 13 October 2011; Label: Deutsche Grammophon	144	62	—	—	4	2
Traces of You	Released: 4 October 2013; Label: Deutsche Grammophon	190	90	77	185	4	1
Home	Released: 6 July 2015; Label: Deutsche Grammophon	—	—	—	—	—	3
Land of Gold	Released: 1 April 2016; Label: Deutsche Grammophon	—	—	—	—	—	5
Chapter I: Forever, For Now	Released: 2023	—	—	—	—	—	—
Chapter II: How Dark It Is Before Dawn	Released: 2024	—	—	—	—	—	—
Chapter III: We Return to Light	Released: 2025	—	—	—	—	—	—
"—" denotes a recording that did not chart or was not released in that territory.

=== Remix albums ===
- Rise Remixes (2006)

=== Live and compilations ===
- Full Circle: Carnegie Hall 2000 (2000)
- Live at Carnegie Hall (2001)
- Concert for George (2003)
- Live in Concert at the Nehru Park, New Delhi (2005)
- Healing the Divide: A Concert for Peace and Reconciliation (2007)
- Reflections (2019)
- Between Us ... (2022)

=== Features ===
- "Adarini" – In Celebration composed by Ravi Shankar, 1995
- Chants of India – Ravi Shankar; George Harrison, featuring Anoushka as Conductor & Assistant, 1997
- Sacred Love – by Sting, 2003
- 8 classical ragas performed on ShankaRagamala composed by Ravi Shankar, 2005
- "Rebirth" – Co-written by Gaurav Raina, Tapan Raj and Anoushka Shankar. Midival Punditz – MIDIval Times, 2005
- "Beloved" – by Anoushka Shankar remixed by Thievery Corporation – Versions, 2006
- "Bring It On" – Featuring Anoushka Shankar on sitar. Written by Lenny Kravitz, It Is Time for a Love Revolution, 2007
- "Mandala" – Featuring Anoushka Shankar on sitar. Co-written by Hilton Garza, Radio Retaliation, 2008
- "Charu Keshi Rain" – Co-written by Nitin Sawhney and Anoushka Shankar, London Undersound, 2008
- "Variant Moods – Duet For Sitar & Violin" (abridged version) Written by Ravi Shankar, At Home With Friends by Joshua Bell, 2009
- "Ixtapa" – Rodrigo y Gabriela & C.U.B.A. featuring Anoushka Shankar on sitar, Area 52, 2012
- "Lucy in the Sky with Diamonds" – Miloš Karadaglić featuring Anoushka Shankar, on the album Blackbird: The Beatles Album, 2016
- "Stop Crying Your Heart Out", Children in Need charity single, 2020
- "A Rock Somewhere" – Jacob Collier feat. Varijashree Venugopal & Anoushka Shankar, 2024
- The Mountain, 2026 album by Gorillaz on the following tracks:
  - "The Mountain" – Gorillaz featuring Dennis Hopper, Ajay Prasanna, Anoushka Shankar, Amaan Ali Bangash & Ayaan Ali Bangash, 2026
  - "Orange County" – Gorillaz featuring Bizarrap, Kara Jackson & Anoushka Shankar, 2026
  - "The Empty Dream Machine" – Gorillaz featuring Black Thought, Johnny Marr & Anoushka Shankar, 2026
  - "The Plastic Guru" – Gorillaz featuring Johnny Marr & Anoushka Shankar, 2026
  - "The Sweet Prince" – Gorillaz featuring Ajay Prasanna, Johnny Marr & Anoushka Shankar, 2026
  - "The Sad God" – Gorillaz featuring Black Thought, Ajay Prasanna, Johnny Marr & Anoushka Shankar, 2026
  - "Noah's Descendants" – Gorillaz featuring Anoushka Shankar & Pamela Jain, 2026

== Filmography ==
=== Film ===
Year	Title	Role	Ref
2004	Dance Like a Man	Lata	
