= Barry Phillips =

Barry Phillips is a musician, arranger and producer of many recordings of Celtic, world and American folk music on the Gourd Music label.

== Life and career ==
Phillips received a Masters of Music degree in composition from the San Francisco Conservatory of Music in 1990. Since graduating, besides recording on his own, Phillips has concertized and recorded with fiddler Alasdair Fraser, guitarist Martin Simpson, harpist Aine Minogue, sitarist Anoushka Shankar and the legendary British rock group Camel, playing cello on their 1999 album Rajaz.

Phillips was a student of Ravi Shankar from 1996 until Shankar's death in 2012 and assisted him in the composing of a cello sonata and a quartet for sitar, cello, harp and tabla for Mstislav Rostropovich. In 2002 he assisted in the composition of Ravi Shankar’s Arpan for the Concert for George (George Harrison celebration) at the Albert Hall, playing cello in the Ravi Shankar Orchestra and also in the string section that played along with Paul McCartney, Eric Clapton, Ringo Starr and others. In addition to remastering much of Ravi Shankar's early recordings, Phillips received a Grammy Award in 2013 for producing Shankar's final album before his death, "The Living Room Sessions Part 1."

Phillips lives in Santa Cruz, California and is married to fellow musician and teacher Shelley Phillips. His son is the photographer Nathan Phillips.

== Discography ==
- Simple Gifts (Gourd Music, 1990) - instrumental arrangements of melodies of the American Shakers
- Wondrous Love (Gourd Music, 1992) - instrumental versions of "Shape Note" tunes
- The World Turned Upside Down (Gourd Music, 1992) - colonial American folk and classical
- Tree of Life (Gourd Music, 1993) - instrumental arrangements of melodies of the American Shakers
- Music On The Mountain (Gourd Music, 1996) - instrumental arrangements of melodies of the American Shakers
- Cello (Gourd Music, 2000)
- Tråd (Gourd Music, 2005)
- Colonial Christmas (Gourd Music, 2009)
- Summer of Cello (Barry Phillips Music, 2011)
- Raga and Raj (East Meets West Music, 2013)

== Discography ==
- Simple Gifts (Gourd Music, 1990) - instrumental arrangements of melodies of the American Shakers
- Wondrous Love (Gourd Music, 1992) - instrumental versions of "Shape Note" tunes
- The World Turned Upside Down (Gourd Music, 1992) - colonial American folk and classical
- Tree of Life (Gourd Music, 1993) - instrumental arrangements of melodies of the American Shakers
- Music On The Mountain (Gourd Music, 1996) - instrumental arrangements of melodies of the American Shakers
- Cello (Gourd Music, 2000)
- Tråd (Gourd Music, 2005)
- Colonial Christmas (Gourd Music, 2009)
- Summer of Cello (Barry Phillips Music, 2011)
- Raga and Raj (East Meets West Music, 2013)
