= MIDIval Punditz =

MIDIval Punditz is an electronica group from New Delhi, India. It is the brainchild of Gaurav Raina and Tapan Raj from New Delhi, India. They were the first Indian electronica act to get signed by an international label, being Six Degrees Records in the United States.

Over the span of their career, the duo have released eight albums. In 2002, they released their debut self-titled album "MIDIval PunditZ". Their 2009 release, "Hello Hello", was their largest album, and it received a spot on Amazon’s top picks for 2009. In 2011, Alicia Keys invited them to perform alongside Norah Jones, will.i.am and Usher in New York City to promote her nonprofit charity organization, Keep a Child Alive. Over the years, their music has been licensed in numerous Hollywood and Bollywood films, international TV series, advertisements, video games and over 50 compilations (such as Backspin: A Six Degrees Ten Year Anniversary Project from 2007). MIDIval Punditz are notable for their blend of electronica with instruments such as the flute and tabla. They have played in many renowned clubs, including Fabric (London), Joe's Pub (NYC), The Fillmore (SF), Blue Frog (Mumbai), and more.

== Discography ==
=== Albums ===
- MIDIval Punditz (2002)
- Let's Enjoy (OST) (2004)
- MIDIval Times (2005)
- MIDIval Punditz Remixed (2007)
- Hello Hello (2009)
- Atomizer Remixes (2009)
- Light (2015)
- Love And Machines (2026)

=== EPs ===
- Rebirth (2005)
- Ali (2005)
- Tonic Remixes (2010)
- Rootha Yaar (2019)
- Nukhta (2019)
- Purvayi (2019)
- Lagan (2022)

=== Filmography ===
- Monsoon Wedding (2001)
- Don (2006)
- Chak de India (2007)
- Karthik Calling Karthik (2010)
- Gully Boy (2019)

=== Singles ===
- "Twilight" feat. Kutle Khan (2014)
- "Purvayi" feat Papon (2019)
- "Raanjhan" (2022)
