= Tanmoy Bose =

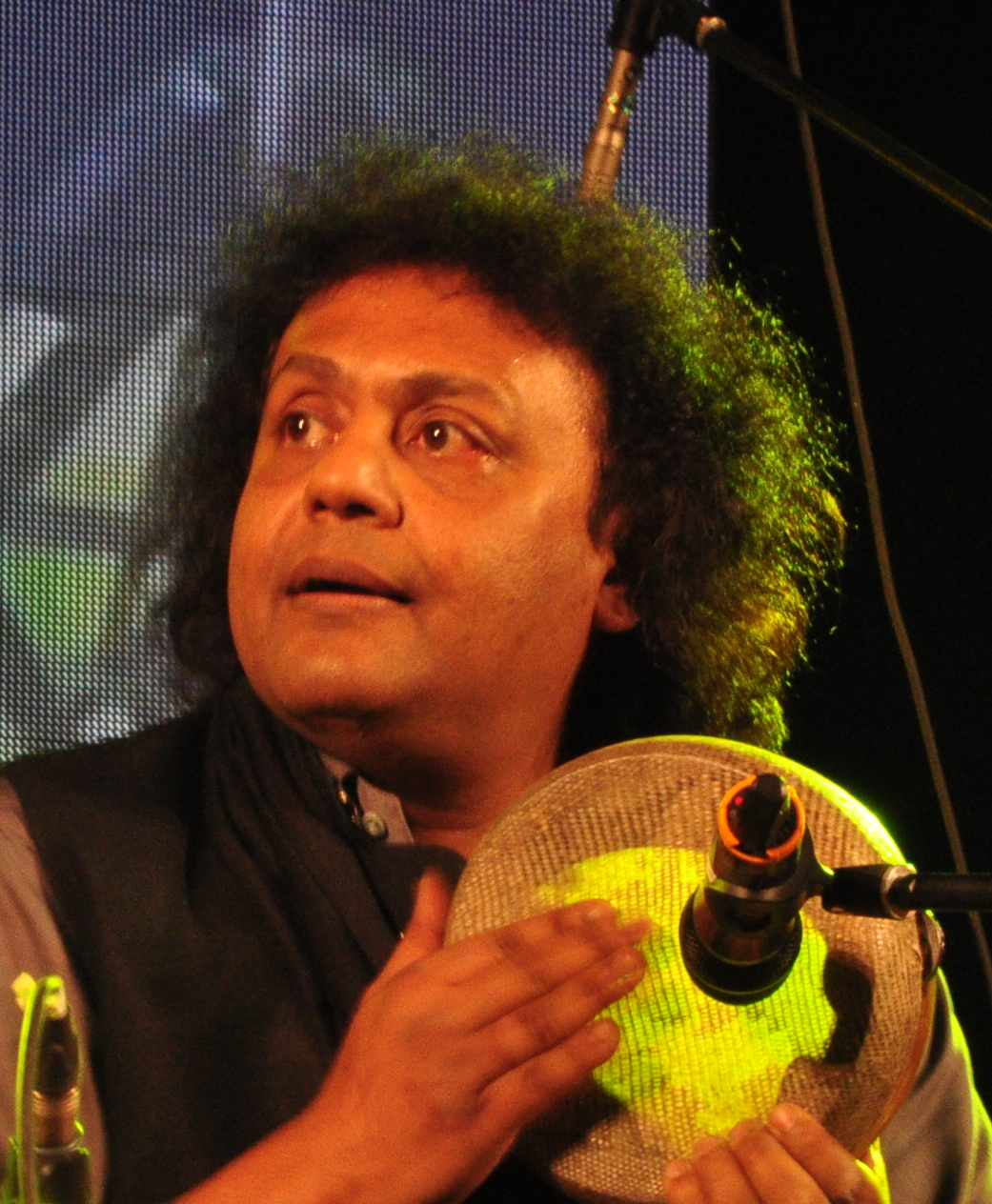
- Bose performing at Kolkata Fusion Fiesta 2013

Background information
- Origin: Kolkata, West Bengal, India
- Genres: Hindustani classical music, jazz fusion
- Occupations: Tabla Maestro and Composer
- Instruments: Tabla, Frame Drums, Harmonium and Vocal
- Years active: 1980–present
- Labels: His Master's Voice, Music Today, EMI, Bol Records, Asha Audio, Times Music
- Website: www.tanmoyboseofficial.com
- Education: Scottish Church College, South Point High School (India)

Tanmoy Bose, whose name is often preceded by the title Pandit (Master), is an Indian percussionist and tabla player, musical producer, film actor and composer. He has collaborated with Pandit Ravi Shankar, Anoushka Shankar and Amjad Ali Khan, and created the musical group The Taal Tantra Experience in 2002.

== Early life and training ==
Tanmoy Bose was born and raised in Kolkata, and studied at the South Point High School and subsequently graduated from the Scottish Church College. His musical education began at the age of seven, learning vocal music from Pandit (teacher) Maharaj Banerjee, harmonium from Pandit Mantu Banerjee, and subsequently learning tabla.

His training in the traditional Guru Shishya Parampara started with Pandit Kanai Dutta, after whose death Tanmoy became a ganda bandh shagird (disciple) of Pandit Shankar Ghosh.

He also received early tutelage from Pt Kanai Dutta. Bose became the Gandabandh Shagird (formally initiated disciple in Indian classical music) under Pandit Shankar Ghosh.

== Career ==
Over the last few years, through his associations with Pandit Ravi Shankar and Amjad Ali Khan, his project, The Taal Tantra Experience has performed in the Mid-East, North America, Europe and India experimenting with jazz, Indian classical music, Indian folk music and indigenous drumming. The name signifies "sadhana" which means worship through rhythm.

Bose has also been a researcher and composer. He has created 'DHWANI, 'BEYOND BORDERS', 'TAALYAAGNA', 'CHATURANG' and 'MOKSH' based on the virtues of Indian Rhythmic nuances. He has also been a television presenter. He has couple of showsto his credit where he interacts with musicians, film directors, actors and dancers. In his 'Drumz Dreamz' project & 'Hridmajhare' he replays the concepts of community drumming and indigenous music, respectively.

He has a number of award-winning films and music projects to his credit.

He also collaborated with Sarod Maestro Padma Shri Pt.Tejendra Narayan Majumdar at the Ganga Manch, Kalagram MahaKumbh Festival on 19 February 2025, along with Pt.Akhilesh Gundecha on the Pakhawaj and Vidwan KG Prasad on the Ghatam, and with Acharya Jayanta Bose, playing a harmonium solo with the later on tabla, for the inauguration of the archival music series Acharya Pariwar.

== Discography ==
| Album | Label |
|---|---|
| Maestros Studio Session | Time Music |
| Tasher Desh | Indo Bangladesh production-Asha Audio |
| Taaltantra-1& 2.World Music | Times Music |
| Taaltantra Experience | World Music.-Ozella Music |
| Baul & Beyond | Folk/world music- Music Today |
| Navaras-Nine Moods/Orchestral | His Master's Voice |
| Solo Tabla – Traditional Indian classical | Bol Records |
| Full Circle: Carnegie Hall/Pandit Ravi Shankar | EMI |
| Anourag – Anoushka Shankar | EMI |
| Live at Carnegie Hall (Anoushka Shankar) | EMI |
| Rise -Anoushka Shankar | EMI |
| Traveler-Anoushka Shankar | EMI |
| Sarod Trilogy-Ustad Amjad Ali Khan/Amaan & Ayaan Ali Khan | Bangash Music |
| Live at Carnegie Hall – Ustad Amjad Ali Khan | |
| Ahiri-Indian classical/sarod Tejendra Narayan | India Archive Music |
| Charukeshi-Indian Classical/Sitar& Sarod Sujat Hussain Khan & Tejendra Narayan | India Archive Music |
| Living room sessions part-1/Pandit RaviShankar | East Meets West Music |
| Desh & Puriya dhaneshree live concert in uk/ Vocal, Rashid Khan | Navras records |
| Raga Unveiled | |
| DRUM DREAMZ- CONTINENTAL DRUMMING. Percussion solos of some of the greatest percussionists from Brazil/Senegal/Iran/India/Europe | TIMES MUSIC |

== Awards and accolades ==
- Sangeet SAMMAN, Govt of West Bengal 2013
- Sangeet Piyasi, Kolkata
- JIS Maha Samman
