= Lights Out Hong Kong =

2006 environmental protest in Hong Kong

Lights Out Hong Kong (香港熄燈 or 888熄燈) is a campaign in Hong Kong to protest against the city's light pollution. Organisers of the campaign urged people in Hong Kong to switch off their lights for 3 minutes at 8 pm on 8 August 2006 as a statement of protest. Campaign organisers hope that the campaign will raise awareness for the issue of air pollution in Hong Kong and urge the government to take action against it. The campaign has gained support from a number of green groups and corporations, and the music duo At17 has volunteered to promote it.

== See also ==
- Action Blue Sky Campaign
- Air pollution
- Environmental organisation
- Earth Hour
- 88888 Lights Out
- Flick Off
- International Dark Sky Week
