= The Climate Reality Project =

Non-profit organization

- Predecessor: The Alliance for Climate Protection; The Climate Project
- Formation: November 2006; 20 years ago
- Type: INGO Non-profit
- Purpose: Environmental education, advocacy
- Headquarters: Washington, D.C.
- Location: Worldwide
- President and Chief Executive Officer: Phyllis Cuttino
- Chairman and Founder: Al Gore
- Website: ClimateRealityProject.org

The Climate Reality Project is a non-profit organization involved in education and advocacy related to climate change. The Climate Reality Project came into being in July 2011 as the consolidation of two environmental groups, the Alliance for Climate Protection and The Climate Project, both of which were founded by Al Gore. Among its activities, The Climate Reality Project hosts an annual event called 24 Hours of Reality.

== Overview ==
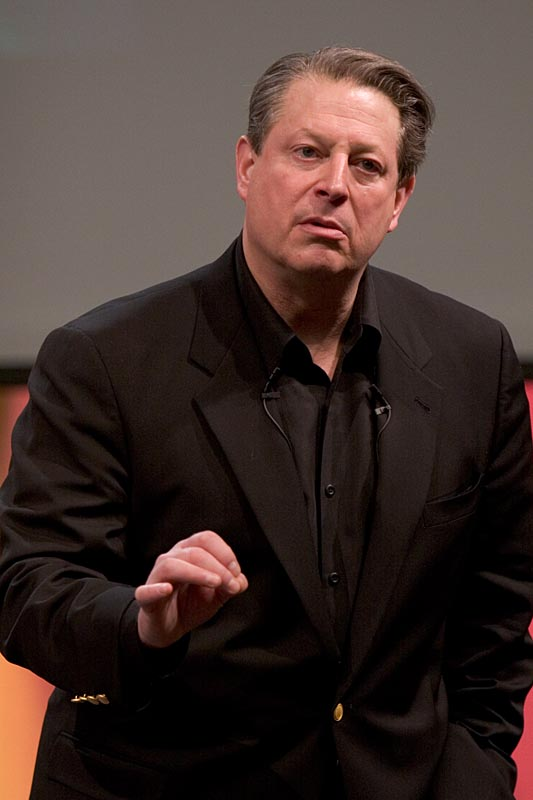
Al Gore during one of his slideshows about the climate crisis, 2006

The Climate Reality Project is focused on climate change education and advocating for climate solutions available today. The organization is a consolidation of two environmental organizations, the Alliance for Climate Protection and the Climate Project, both founded in 2006 by former U.S. Vice President Al Gore.

Gore currently serves as chairman of the board of directors.

As of 2021, the organization said it operated 10 branches worldwide and was active in 170 countries.

The Climate Reality Project has been growing drastically over the past few years. The Climate Reality Project now has a global network of 3.5 million. With this network, the project aims to construct a sustainable, net-zero future. This group has four campaigns worldwide to help people be more sustainable so that our world is a cleaner place for people to live. The goal of this group is to reach true net zero by the year 2050. Another goal of this organization is to halve the global emissions by 2030. This project offers speeches of professionals to inform and teach the public about the climate crisis. This group of people aims to tell the truth about climate. The Climate Reality Project makes extensive efforts to stop new fossil fuel projects from being built while also trying to shut down fossil fuel projects that are up and running.

== History ==
=== Alliance for Climate Protection ===
The Alliance for Climate Protection was founded in 2006 by Al Gore to encourage civic action against climate change. The organization was founded in Palo Alto, California, and later moved to Menlo Park, California, before relocating to Washington, D.C., in 2009. Originally established as a 501(c)(3), the organization later included an affiliated 501(c)(4), the Climate Protection Action Fund, which developed advocacy campaigns focused on climate change solutions through grassroots organizing and lobbying.

The organization was partially funded by proceeds donated from Gore's 2006 documentary An Inconvenient Truth, as well as profits from the book of the same name. Gore also donated his salary from his work for the venture capital firm Kleiner Perkins Caulfield & Byers and prize money from his 2007 Nobel Peace Prize for a total of more than $2.7 million. The distributor of An Inconvenient Truth, Paramount Classics, also donated 5 percent of the film's box office earnings to the Alliance. The Alliance was also funded by profits from Live Earth concerts in 2007.

The Alliance encouraged federal policies that limited greenhouse gas emissions and supported low-carbon power sources. Former campaigns from the Alliance include the bipartisan "We" campaign, launched in 2008. The campaign, which included an advertisement called "We Can Solve It" featuring Nancy Pelosi and Newt Gingrich jointly calling for a response to climate change, was created to prompt public action against climate change on a national and international level. The "We" campaign included partnerships with the Girl Scouts of the United States of America, the United Steelworkers of America and the National Audubon Society. The same year, the Alliance launched the "Repower America" campaign to support Gore's directive to shift American homes to 100 percent clean energy within 10 years. This campaign supported climate change legislation in the United States and, according to The Washington Post in 2008, was one of the farthest reaching public advocacy initiatives in recent history.

Also in 2008, the Alliance created the Reality Coalition in partnership with the National Wildlife Federation, the League of Conservation Voters, the Natural Resources Defense Council and the Sierra Club. The Reality Coalition used television, print and online advertisements as well as grassroots events to challenge the idea of coal pollution mitigation.

=== The Climate Project ===
The Climate Project, founded in 2006 and based in Nashville, Tennessee, was also supported by Gore's profits from the documentary An Inconvenient Truth. The Climate Project was an educational, worldwide grassroots organization that trained selected members of the public to give public talks, similar to Gore's presentation in the film. The talks focused on the harmful effects of climate change and ways to address climate change at the grassroots level. By 2009, the project had more than 3,000 participants worldwide. These participants, trained by Gore, delivered 70,000 presentations to 7.3 million people.

=== Recent history ===
In March 2010, the Alliance for Climate Protection and The Climate Project combined to create a single organization. The new organization was known as the Alliance for Climate Protection until it was renamed The Climate Reality Project in July 2011. The organization brought together the aims of its two predecessors to focus on education initiatives related to climate change as well as continuing to develop a grassroots network to address climate change.

== Activities ==
=== 24 Hours of Reality campaign ===
The Climate Reality Project hosts an annual event called 24 Hours of Reality, a 24-hour live broadcast about the climate crisis and its solutions with a one-hour segment in every time zone. Each broadcast features celebrities, musicians, elected officials, and thought leaders from around the world. In 2017, the broadcast had a potential reach of 400 million people.

Themes for each annual broadcast are:

- 2011: 24 Hours of Reality
- 2012: 24 Hours of Reality: The Dirty Weather Report
- 2013: 24 Hours of Reality: The Cost of Carbon
- 2014: 24 Hours of Reality: 24 Reasons for Hope
- 2015: 24 Hours of Reality and Live Earth: The World is Watching
- 2016: 24 Hours of Reality: The Road Forward
- 2017: 24 Hours of Reality: Be the Voice of Reality
- 2018: 24 Hours of Reality: Protect Our Planet, Protect Ourselves
- 2019: 24 Hours of Reality: Truth to Action
- 2020: 24 Hours of Reality: Countdown to the Future

The first event, in 2011, was a 24-hour event that was broadcast live over the Internet and featured 24 presenters across 24 time zones presenting in 13 different languages. The presentations, which stressed a link between climate change and oil and coal producers, started in Mexico City and traveled west before culminating in New York City with a presentation by The Climate Reality Project's chairman Al Gore. The event included celebrity hosts and panel members such as Renee Zellweger, Fran Drescher and Virgin Group's Sir Richard Branson. The webcast received 8 million views, 5 million of which were unique viewers, and was awarded a "Silver Lion" at the Cannes Lions International Festival of Creativity event in 2012. Accompanying this event, The Climate Reality Project also released several short videos covering topics related to climate change. The videos included Doubt, Climate 101 and Grassroots.

A second webcast called 24 Hours of Reality: The Dirty Weather Report was broadcast beginning on November 14, 2012. This broadcast followed a format similar to the inaugural event and featured speeches and presentations from more than 100 activists, business leaders and scientists in 24 locations. The 2012 webcast focused on the impact coal, oil and gas pollution have on weather patterns. The webcast attracted 14 million unique viewers and a viewership of more than 16 million, which set a Ustream record for the most online viewers in a 24-hour period. The event also generated 135 million tweets from Twitter users, compared with 120 million tweets in 2011, and received ten Telly Awards in 2013 including two silver Telly awards in the News/News Feature and Social Responsibility categories and seven bronze Telly awards.

=== Climate Reality Leadership Corps ===
The Climate Reality Project also addresses climate change through a network of Climate Reality Leaders, which the organization calls the Climate Reality Leadership Corps. As of 2025, The Climate Reality Leadership Corps has conducted 60 training events to prepare Climate Reality Leaders to communicate and conduct effective advocacy events within their local communities. Climate Reality Leaders come from 154 countries often on their own expenses. Members of the Climate Reality Leadership Corps lead educational events and encourage activity to address climate change in their local communities.

=== Green Schools Campaign ===
In 2005, the projected created the Green Schools Campaign as a subsidiary to help schools transition to renewable energy.

== See also ==
- Planet Relief
- Live Earth
- Earth Hour
- Denmark plants trees
