= Earth Hour =

Annual symbolic environmental event

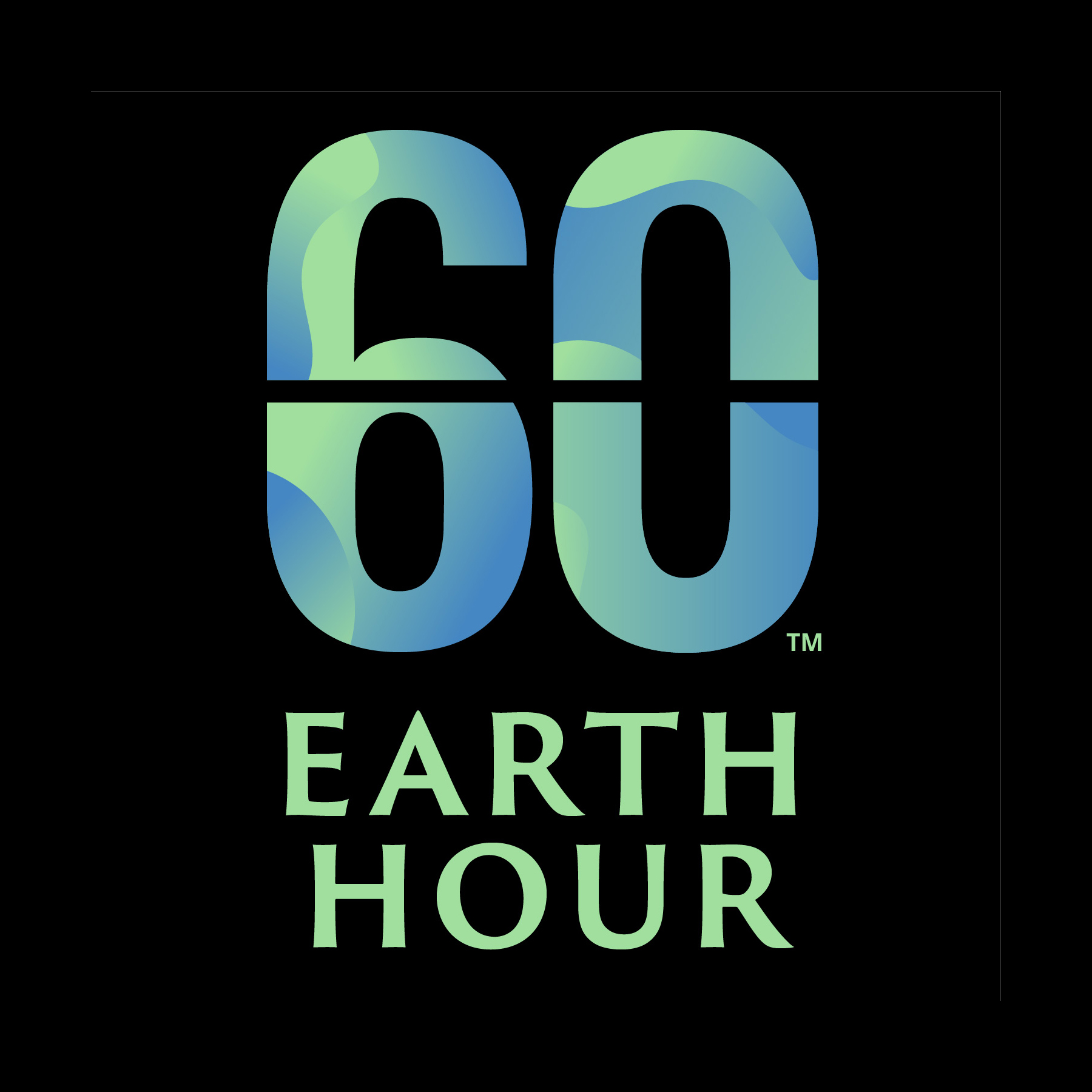
- Observed by: World Wildlife Fund for Nature (WWF)
- Type: International, Movement, World Wildlife Fund (WWF)
- Significance: Climate change and to save Earth
- Celebrations: Mass activations to encourage the public to give an hour for the planet; Switching off national and international monuments and landmarks
- Begins: 8:30pm
- Ends: 9:30 pm
- Date: Last or penultimate Saturday of March
- 2025 date: March 22
- 2026 date: March 28
- 2027 date: March 20
- 2028 date: March 25
- Duration: 60 minutes
- Frequency: Annual
- Related to: Earth Day

Earth Hour is a worldwide movement organized by the World Wildlife Fund (WWF). The event is held annually, encouraging the individuals, communities, and businesses to give an hour for Earth, and additionally marked by landmarks and businesses switching off non-essential electric lights, for one hour from 8:30 to 9:30p.m., usually on the last Saturday of March, as a symbol of commitment to the planet. It was started as a lights-off event in Sydney, New South Wales, Australia, in 2007.

Occasionally, in years when Holy Saturday falls on the last Saturday of March (as in 2024), Earth Hour is held a week earlier.

The next editions of Earth Hour will be held on 20 March 2027. The dates for upcoming years editions are:

- 20 March 2027
- 25 March 2028
- 31 March 2029
- 30 March 2030

== History of Earth Hour ==
=== Conception and start: 2004–2007 ===
In 2004, confronted with scientific findings, WWF Australia met with advertising agency Leo Burnett Sydney to "discuss ideas for engaging Australians on the issue of climate change". The idea of a large scale switch off was coined and developed in 2006, originally under the working title "The Big Flick". WWF Australia presented their concept to Fairfax Media who, along with Sydney Lord Mayor Clover Moore, agreed to back the event. The 2007 Earth Hour was held on March 31 in Sydney, Australia at 7:30pm, local time.

In October 2007, San Francisco ran its own "Lights Out" program inspired by the Sydney Earth Hour. After their successful event in October, the organizers decided to rally behind the Earth Hour being planned for March 2008.

=== 2008 ===
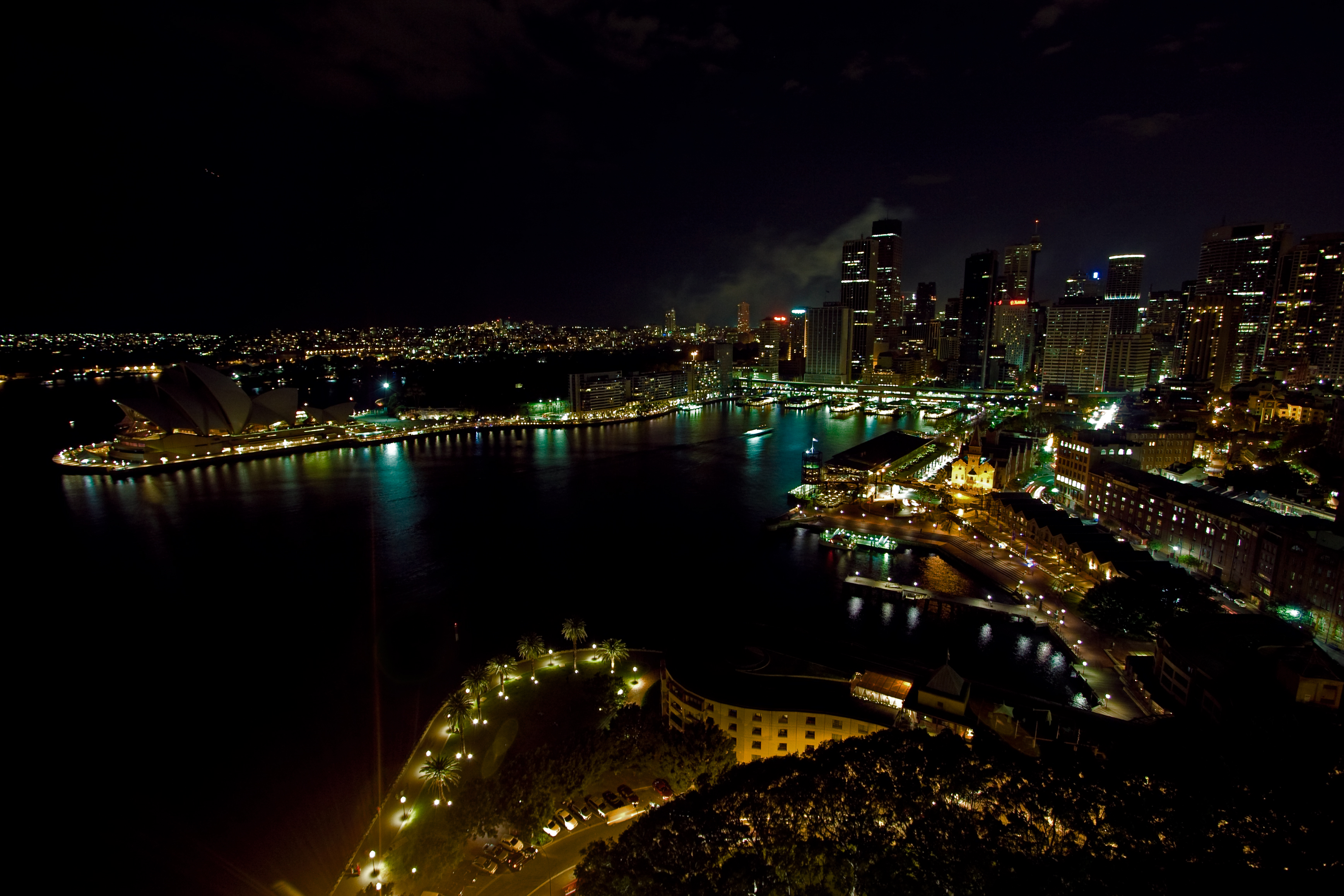
Overview of Sydney during Earth Hour 2008

Earth Hour 2008 was held internationally on March 29, 2008, from 8p.m. to 9p.m. local time, marking the first anniversary of the event. Thirty five countries around the world participated as official flagship cities and over 400 cities also supported. Landmarks around the world turned off their non-essential lighting for Earth Hour. Some websites took part in the event, with Google's homepage going "dark" on the day.

According to a Zogby International online survey, 36 million Americans—approximately 16% of the United States adult population—participated in Earth Hour 2008. The survey also showed there was a 4-percentage point increase in the level of interest in environmental issues such as climate change and pollution directly after the event (73 percent pre-event versus 77 percent post-event).

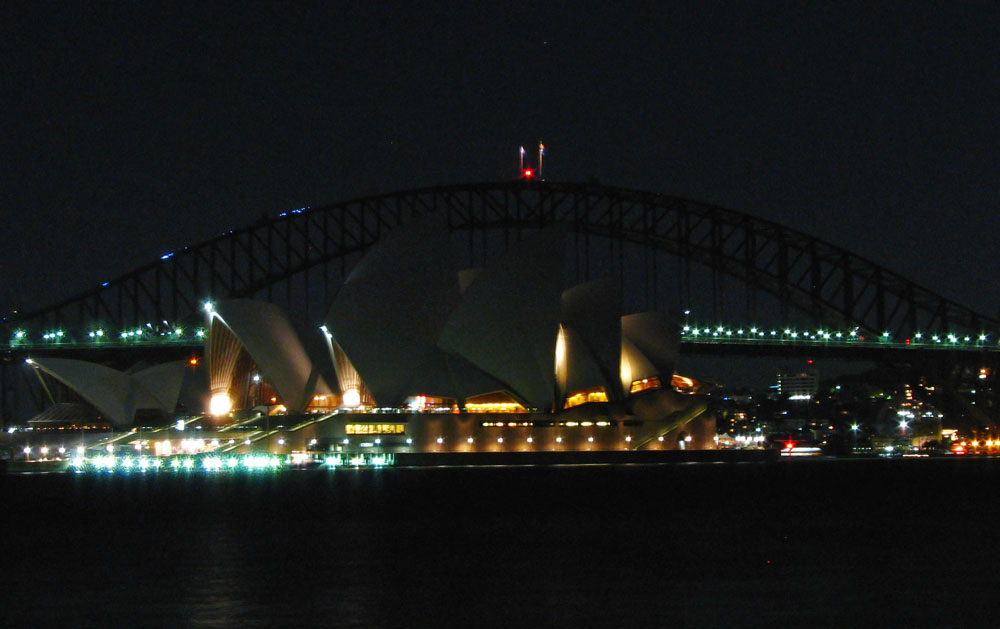
Sydney Harbour Bridge and Sydney Opera House were darkened during Earth Hour 2007.

Tel Aviv scheduled their Earth Hour for Thursday March 27, 2008 to avoid conflict with Sabbath. Dublin moved their Earth Hour to between 9 and 10p.m. due to their northern geographical location.

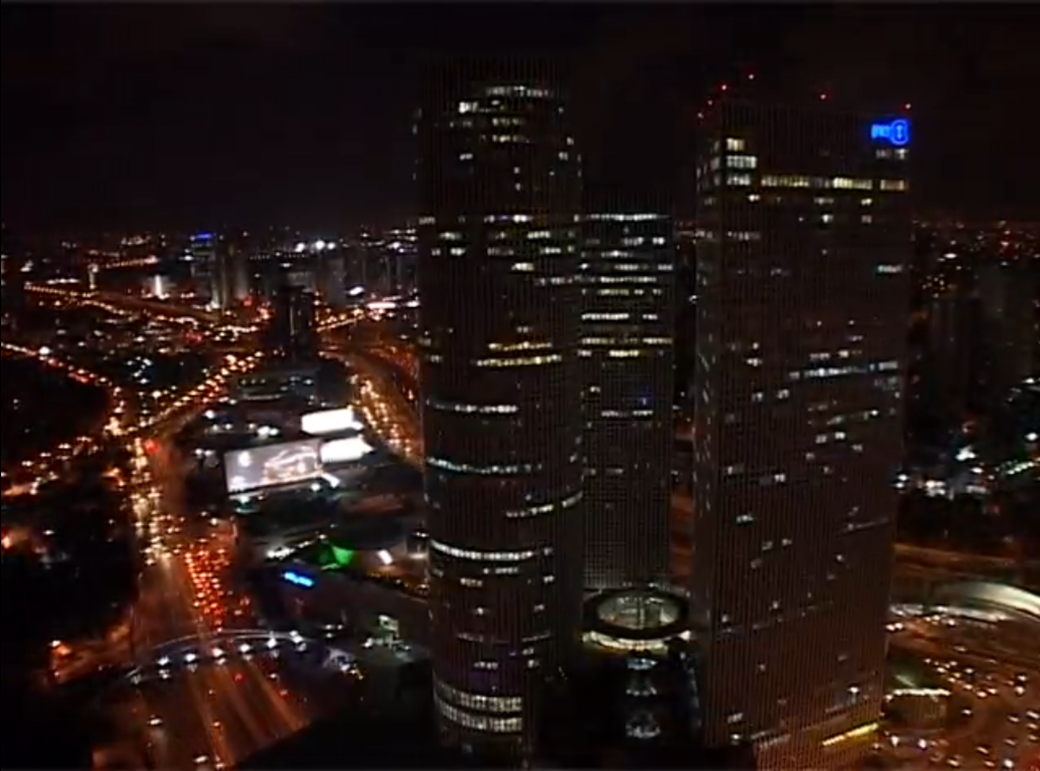
Azrieli Center in Tel Aviv darkened for Earth Hour 2010.

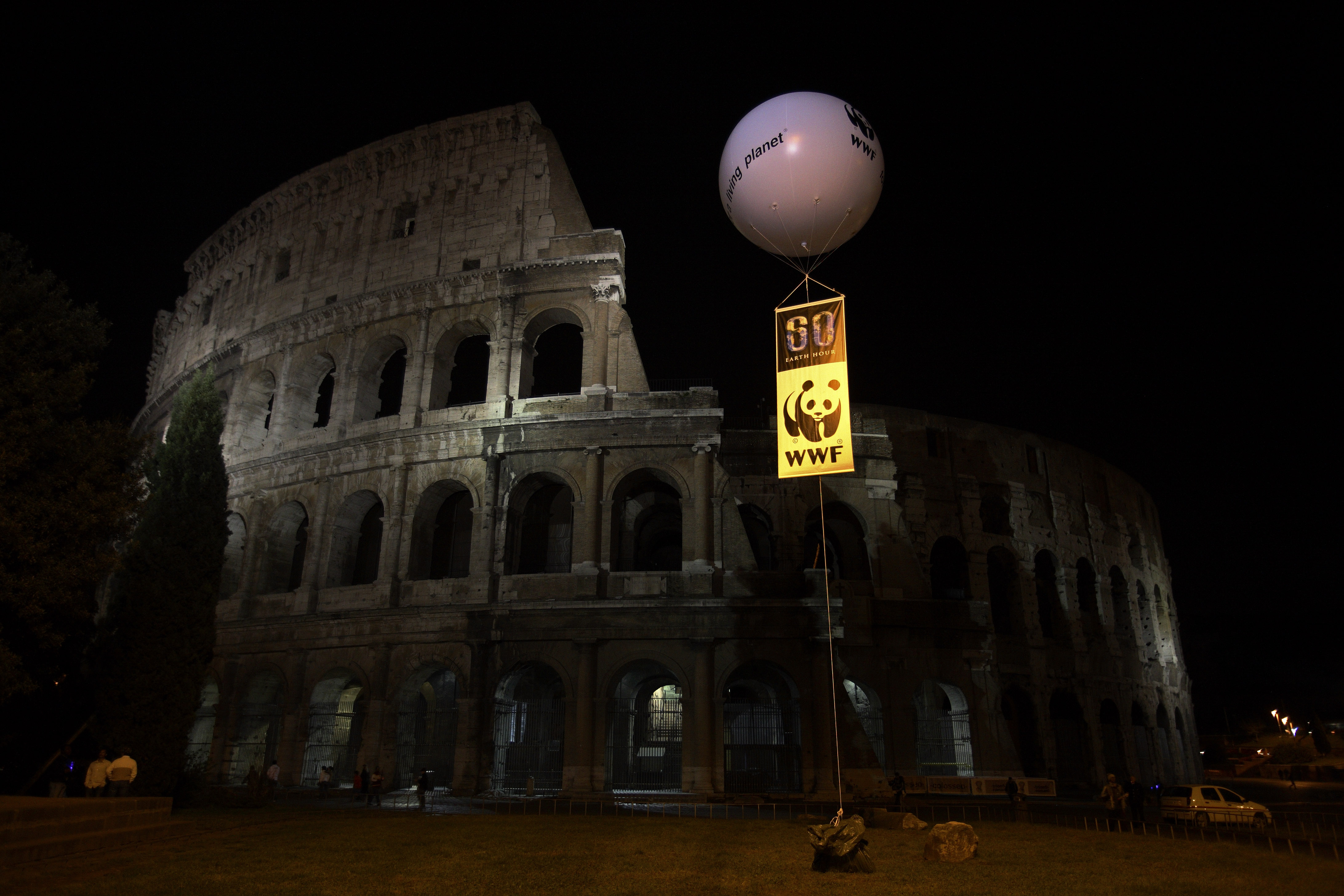
Colosseum darkened for Earth Hour 2008

According to WWF Thailand, Bangkok decreased electricity usage by 73.34 megawatts, which, over one hour, is equivalent to 41.6 tonnes of carbon dioxide. The Bangkok Post gave different figures of 165 megawatt-hours and 102 tonnes of carbon dioxide. This was noted to be significantly less than a similar campaign initiated by Bangkok's City Hall the previous year in May, when 530 megawatt-hours were saved and 143 tonnes of carbon dioxide emission were cut.

Philippine Electricity Market Corp. noted that power consumption dropped by about 78.63 megawatts in Metro Manila, and up to 102.2 megawatts on Luzon. The maximum demand drop of around 39 MW was experienced at 8:14p.m. in Metro Manila and of around 116 MW at 8:34p.m. in the Luzon grid.

Ontario used approximately 900 megawatt-hours less electrical energy during Earth Hour. At one point, Toronto saw an 8.7% reduction in consumption as compared to a typical March Saturday night.

Ireland, as a whole, had a reduction in electricity use of about 1.5% for the evening. In the three-hour period between 6:30p.m. and 9:30pm, there was a reduction of 50 megawatts, saving 150 megawatt-hours, or approximately 60 tonnes of carbon dioxide.

In Dubai, where external lighting on several major city landmarks was turned off and street lighting in selected areas was dimmed by 50%, the Electricity and Water Authority reported savings of 100 megawatt-hours of electricity. This represented a 2.4% reduction in demand compared to before the hour began.

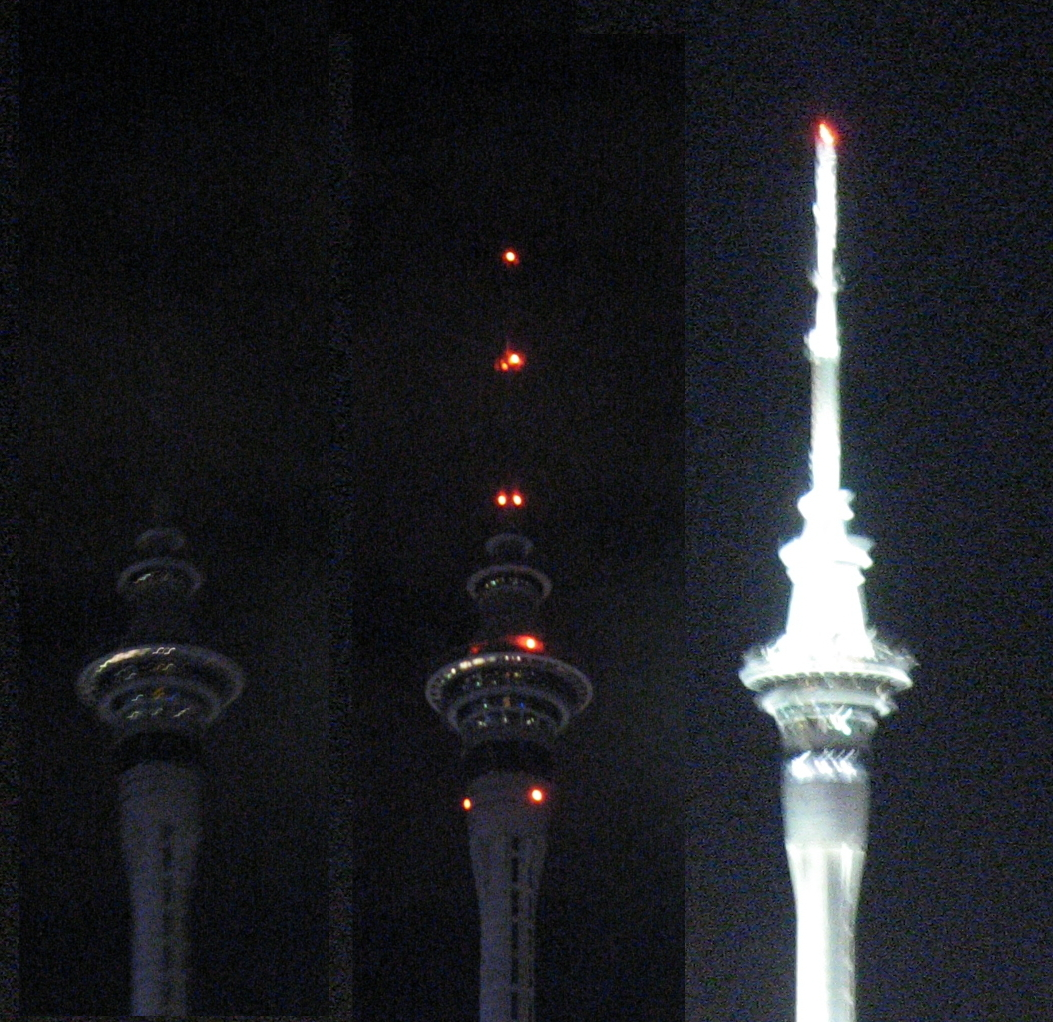
The Sky Tower in Auckland, New Zealand, switched off its usual floodlighting during the Earth Hour, and re-lit afterwards. (The red lights in the middle image are aircraft warning lights.)

The best result was from Christchurch, New Zealand, with the city reporting a drop of 13% in electricity demand. However, national grid operator Transpower reported that New Zealand's power consumption during Earth Hour was 335 megawatts, higher than the 328 megawatt average of the previous two Saturdays. Melbourne, Australia reduced demand by 10.1%. Sydney, being the city that participated in both the 2007 and 2008 Earth Hours, cut electricity consumption by 8.4%. This is less than the previous year's 10.2%; however, Earth Hour executive director Andy Ridley made the claim that after factoring margin of error, the participation in this city was the same.

The worst result was from Calgary, Canada. The city's power consumption actually went up 3.6% at the hour's peak electricity demand. Calgary's weather plays a large role in power consumption, and the city experienced weather 12°C (around 22°F) colder than the previous Saturday's recorded temperature in the inaugural year. Enmax, the city's power supplier, has confirmed that in all subsequent years, Calgarians have not supported the Earth Hour initiative, noting that power consumption changed only marginally during the hour in 2010 and 2011 (1% or less) and in 2012 and 2013 showed no appreciable change in power usage at all.

=== 2009 ===
Earth Hour 2009 was from 8:30p.m. to 9:30p.m. local time, March 28, 2009. The campaign was titled "Vote Earth" and was dubbed "the world's first global vote" with one billion votes was the stated aim for Earth Hour 2009, in the context of the pivotal 2009 United Nations Climate Change Conference. WWF reported that 88 countries and 4,159 cities participated in Earth Hour 2009, ten times more cities than Earth Hour 2008 had (2008 saw 400 cities participate).

Among the participants in 2009 was, for the first time, the United Nations Headquarters in New York City.

In Egypt, the lights went out on the Sphinx and the Great Pyramids of Giza from 8:30 to 9:30 pm.

The Philippines saw participation from 647 cities and towns; over 10 million Filipinos were estimated to have joined in the hour-long lights-off. This was followed by Greece with 484 cities and towns participating, and Australia with 309.

Despite official organizers WWF stating that the event is not about the reduction in electricity, a number of public institutions reported on electricity savings in their cities to see participation numbers. The Canadian province of Ontario, excluding the city of Toronto, saw a decrease of 6% in electricity usage while Toronto saw a decrease of 15.1% (nearly doubled from 8.7% the previous year) as many businesses darkened, including the landmark CN Tower.

The Philippines was able to save 611 MWh of electricity during the time period, which is said to be equivalent to shutting down a dozen coal-fired power plants for an hour.

Swedish electricity operator Svenska Kraftnät recorded a 2.1% decrease in power consumption from its projected figure between 8p.m. and 9pm. The following hour, the corresponding number was 5%. This is equivalent to the consumption of approximately half a million households out of the total 4.5 million households in Sweden.

According to the National Power Dispatch Centre, Vietnam's electricity demand fell 140 MWh during Earth Hour.

=== 2010 ===
The metal structure of the greenhouses of the curitiban Botanic Garden (Curitiba, Paraná, Southern Brazil), with its lights off on March 27, 2010

Earth Hour 2010 was held from 8:30p.m. to 9:30p.m. local time on March 27. In Israel, the hour was held on April 22. 126 countries participated in Earth Hour 2010.

In the United States polling showed that an estimated 90,000,000 Americans participated in Earth Hour as lights were turned off around the country, including landmarks such as Mount Rushmore, the Las Vegas Strip, the Empire State Building and Niagara Falls.

Some cities and landmarks took the opportunity to make more long-term adjustments to their everyday power consumption. In Chicago, the Building Owners and Managers Association (BOMA) developed lighting guidelines to reduce light pollution and reduce the carbon footprint of downtown buildings. Mount Rushmore in South Dakota started powering down each night around 9 p.m. instead of 11 p.m.

In Vietnam, electricity demand fell 500,000 kWh during Earth Hour 2010, which was three times larger than the first time the country joined the event in 2009.

In the Philippines, 1,067 towns and cities pledged participation in 2010 and over 15 million Filipinos participated in the event.

About 4,000 cities participated, including landmarks such as Big Ben, the Empire State Building, the Sydney Opera House, the Eiffel Tower, the Parthenon, the Brandenburg Gate, and the Forbidden City.

=== 2011 ===
Earth Hour 2011 was the biggest year in the campaign's five-year history, reaffirming it as the largest ever voluntary action for the environment. In 2011, the tagline "Beyond the Hour" was adopted by organizers as a way to encourage people to take their commitment to the cause beyond the 60-minute event. Together with agency Leo Burnett, Earth Hour unveiled an updated planet themed logo that included a small plus symbol to the right of the signature "60" which was used in previous years. The 60+ symbol continues to be the main logo used by campaign organizers around the world.

Earth Hour 2011 took place in a record 5,251 cities and towns in 135 countries and territories on all seven continents. It had an estimated reach of 1.8 billion people across the globe. In addition to this, the campaign's digital footprint grew to 91 million.

In India, Earth Hour 2011 was held on March 26, 2011, from 8:30p.m. to 9:30pm. IST, flagged off by the Chief Minister of Delhi Sheila Dikshit and Earth Hour 2011 Ambassador and Bollywood actress Vidya Balan in the presence of Jim Leape, Director General, WWF International. Rosebowl channel suspended broadcasting from 8.30p.m. to 9.30p.m. to mark the observance of Earth Hour.

In Azerbaijan, Maiden Tower darkened for Earth Hour.

The Philippines, which has been an active participant of the Earth Hour, had an early "earth hour" when power was accidentally interrupted, plunging Metro Manila and nearby provinces into darkness. After power was restored, major buildings, commercial centers and residential areas in Metro Manila and most provinces continued to turn off their lights, while participating channels in the Philippines, ABS-CBN, Nickelodeon and Cartoon Network halted their transmissions for an hour.

Thirty provinces and cities in Vietnam took part in Earth Hour 2011 with the main event held in Nha Trang. The nation's electricity demand fell 400,000 kWh, one-fifth less than the previous year's. Vietnam managed to save 500 million VND (US$23,809) thanks to the saved power.

YouTube promoted the Earth Hour by changing its logo, and by adding a switch on/off feature near the title of each video, so that users could change the background colour from white to black.

One of the least co-operative areas traditionally has been Alberta; in 2008, Calgary's power consumption went up during Earth Hour. The trend continued in 2011 when Edmonton's power usage also increased. While Calgary's power usage went down in 2011 during the event, electricity officials could not distinguish their readings between normal usage and a conscious attempt to participate.

=== 2012 ===
Earth Hour Global headquarters was moving from Sydney to Singapore in February 2012. A launch event took place at ION Orchard on February 20, with the move supported by Singapore's Economic Development Board (EDB) and WWF-Singapore.

Earth Hour 2012 was observed on March 31, 2012, from 8:30 p.m. to 9:30 p.m. (participants' local time). It took place in more than 7000 cities and towns across 152 countries and territories, making it the biggest growth year for the campaign since 2009. It was also the first year that Earth Hour was celebrated in space, with Dutch astronaut André Kuipers tweeting at various moments during the event's trek around the globe.

=== 2013 ===
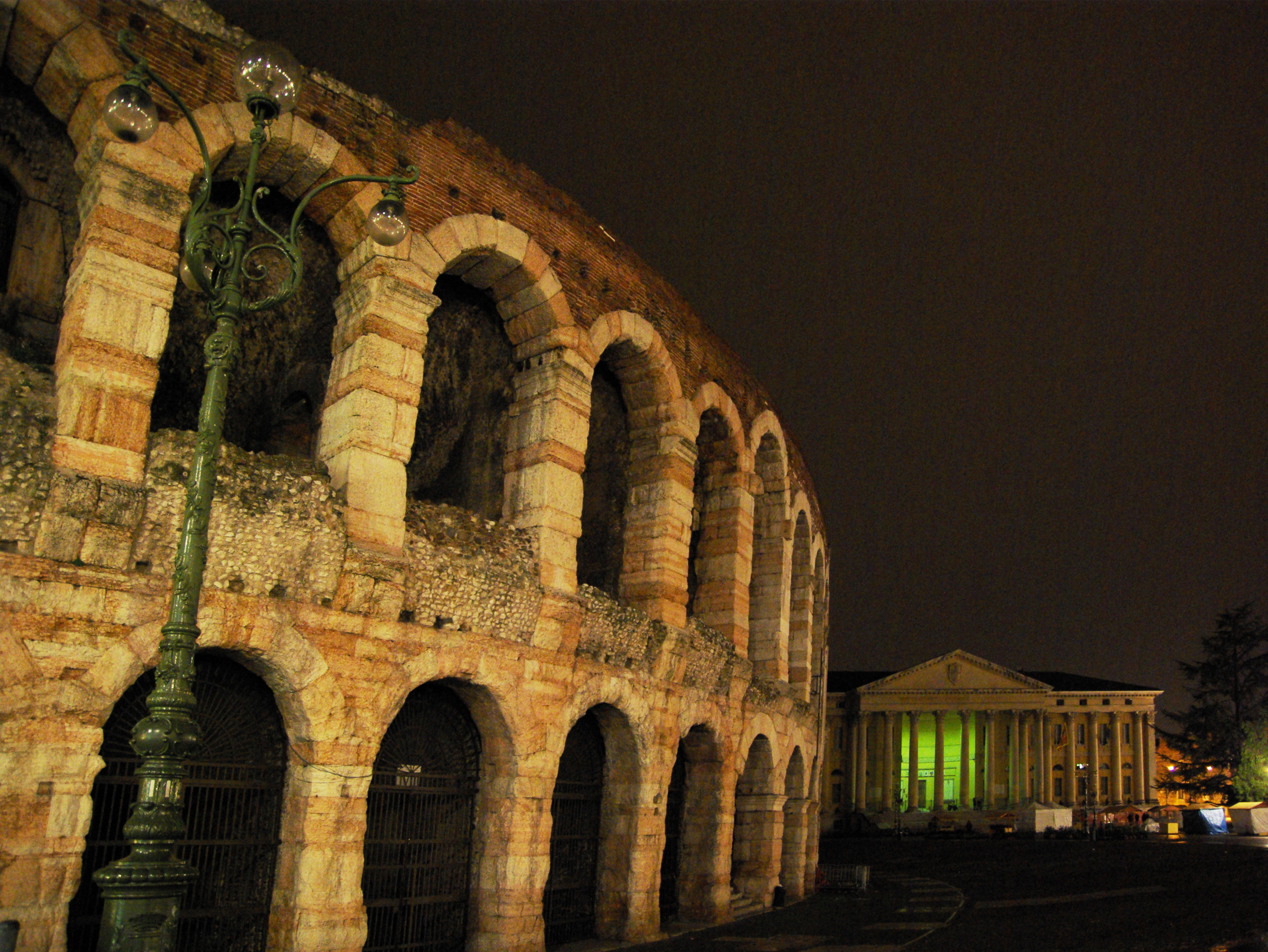
Italy, Verona, Arena with backlight off on square Bra, in the bottom Town Hall during Earth Hour 2013

Earth Hour 2013 was held across the world on Saturday, March 23 at 8:30p.m. to 9:30p.m. local time to avoid taking place after European Summer Time began, ensuring a greater impact for the lights-off event. It was also changed to avoid coinciding with the Christian Holy Saturday, which fell on March 30 of that year.

==== Africa ====
In 2013, the world's first Earth Hour Forest began in Uganda, an ongoing project that aims to restore 2700 hectares of degraded land. Standard Chartered Bank-Uganda pledged to help fill the forest with more than 250,000 trees.

Earth Hour commemorations in Madagascar had as their highlight the distribution of one thousand wood-saving stoves to victims of the cyclone Haruna in the southern town of Toliara, extensively damaged in the February 22 storm. WWF-Madagascar and ADES (Association pour le Développement de l'Energie Solaire) distributed an additional 2,200 wood-saving stoves later that year.

Former President of Botswana, Festus Mogae promised to plant one million indigenous trees over four years, as part of his "I Will If You Will" challenge for Earth 2013.

==== Europe ====
WWF-Russia launched its 2013 campaign aiming to secure more than 100,000 signatures from Russian citizens to petition for amendments to the current forest legislation. The petition reached more than 127,000 signatures before the Earth Hour event, ensuring the legislation was debated in the State Duma by politicians.

=== 2014 ===
Earth Hour 2014 took place on Saturday, March 29, during the same 8:30 to 9:30p.m. local timeslot. Earth Hour Blue was launched as a global crowdfunding and crowdsourcing platform for the planet. "It is all about the collective effort of individuals around the world getting together to help fund or add their voice to support on-the-ground environmental and social projects that deliver real outcomes."

The Earth Hour 2014 Report highlighted a broad range of environmental outcomes achieved by the movement across 162 countries and territories around the world. More than US$60,000 was raised on the Earth Hour Blue platform for grassroots environmental projects run by WWF. The movement also saw campaigns to help protect Australia's Great Barrier Reef, the launch of a Blue Sky App in China, and the delivery of thousands of wood efficient stoves to communities in Madagascar.

=== 2015 ===
Earth Hour 2015 took place on Saturday, March 28, again between 8:30 and 9:30p.m. local time. The tagline for the global campaign was "Change Climate Change", returning to the movement's original focus to initiate citizen action on global warming. A day before the event, over 170 countries and territories had confirmed their participation; with more than 1200 landmarks and close to 40 UNESCO world heritage sites set for the switch off.

For the second year running, Earth Hour Blue aims to raise funds for WWF organized climate focused projects on a crowdfunding platform. This year, crowdfunding projects include solar light distribution in the Philippines and India, and wildlife based projects from Colombia, Uganda and Indonesia.

Uniquely participating in the Earth Hour activity are the inhabitants of an island called Sibuyan in the Philippines who turned on their lights to elevate the message of using renewable energy. The island's source of electricity is a mini-hydro power plant.

=== 2016 ===
Earth Hour 2016 was on Saturday, March 19, from 8:30p.m. to 9:30p.m. during participants' local time. It was also changed to avoid coinciding with the Christian Holy Saturday, which fell on March 26 of that year. It was the 10th anniversary of the campaign's beginnings in Sydney, Australia. Östersund in Sweden cancelled the 2016 event, following a spate of sex attacks, highlighting safety as a subject for discussion when saving resources. Almost all the countries in the world observed Earth Hour.

=== 2017 ===
Earth Hour occurred on Saturday, March 25 from 8:30pm to 9:30pm.

=== 2018 ===
Earth Hour 2018 took place on March 24, from 8:30p.m. to 9:30p.m. in participants' time, in order to avoid coinciding with Christian Holy Saturday which fell on March 31.

=== 2019 ===
Earth Hour 2019 was held on March 30, from 8:30p.m. to 9:30pm. A total of 188 countries participated in Earth Hour 2019. Miss Earth 2018 Nguyễn Phương Khánh from Vietnam was designated as the Earth Hour Ambassador to implement several environmental protection activities. As ambassador, Phuong Khanh urged everyone to voluntarily turn off unnecessary lights and equipment for an hour, contributing to spreading the message "Save Energy, Save Earth – Energy saving, Earth protection".

=== 2020 ===
Earth Hour 2020 took place on Saturday, March 28 from 8:30pm to 9:30pm local time and it went digitally due to the COVID-19 pandemic. 190 countries and territories came together to support this movement and few of the many public personalities such as UN Secretary General António Guterres, Pope Francis, environmental activist Greta Thunberg, Canadian Prime Minister Justin Trudeau, Indian film star Amitabh Bachchan, UN Environment Goodwill ambassador Dia Mirza, Kenyan singing sensation Nikita Kering, Colombian model Claudia Bahamon and British Singer Songwriter, Cat Stevens also participated in Earth Hour 2020.

=== 2021 ===
Earth Hour 2021 took place on Saturday, March 27 from 8:30pm to 9:30pm local time.

=== 2022 ===
Earth Hour 2022 took place on Saturday, March 26 from 8:30pm to 9:30pm local time.

=== 2023 ===
Earth Hour 2023 took place on Saturday, March 25 at 8:30pm to 9:30pm local time. Ahead of the event, Earth Hour was rebranded as the "Biggest Hour for Earth", which included a bigger focus on community action and less reliance on the 'switch off'. Over the course of the event Earth Hour measured over 410,000 hours of planet-positive activities pledged as part of the 'Hour Bank' which collated committed actions by the public.

=== 2024 ===
Earth Hour 2024 took place on Saturday, March 23 from 8:30pm to 9:30pm local time in order to avoid coinciding with Western Christian Holy Saturday which fell on March 30.

In its 16th anniversary of the Earth Hour Philippines, Filipinos, led by ambassador SB19's John Paulo Bagnas Nase and Toni Yulo-Loyzaga, turned off their lights for 60 minutes on Saturday night, 8:30 PM – 9:30 PM Philippine Standard Time, March 23, 2024. The annual switch-off event was held at Kartilya ng Katipunan in Bonifacio Shrine Manila, which was organized by World Wide Fund for Nature Philippines. "This year, Earth Hour Philippines' focus is on addressing plastic pollution," WWF-Philippines director Katherine Custodio said. Marcos Jr. underscored the role of "energy efficiency in addressing climate change towards a greener future per the 'You Have The Power' campaign." Okada Manila powered down its exterior lighting and iconic US$30 million "The Fountain", the largest musical fountain in Philippines and dimmed the lights in its Coral and Pearl lobbies, wellness centers and other areas within the integrated resort. "We each have a role in fostering change and must act together," said President Byron Yip. Jollibee Foods Corporation stores from the Philippines, China, North America, Europe, the Middle East, and Asia also gave an hour for the Earth, in solidarity with over 190 countries.

=== 2025 ===
Earth Hour 2025 took place on Saturday, March 22 from 8:30pm to 9:30pm local time in order to avoid taking place after European Summer Time began.

=== 2026 ===
Earth Hour 2026 marked the 20^{th} anniversary of the global environmental movement, with the theme 'Give an Hour to Earth,' encouraging individuals, communities, and organizations worldwide to dedicate one hour toward actions supporting environmental sustainability and conservation.

== Measurement of reduction in electricity use ==
The Earth Hour Global FAQ page states:

Earth Hour does not purport to be an energy/carbon reduction exercise, it is a symbolic action. Therefore, we do not engage in the measurement of energy/carbon reduction levels for the hour itself. Earth Hour is an initiative to encourage individuals, businesses and governments around the world to take accountability for their ecological footprint and engage in dialogue and resource exchange that provides real solutions to our environmental challenges. Participation in Earth Hour symbolizes a commitment to change beyond the hour.

A 2014 study published in Energy Research and Social Science compiled 274 measurements of observed changes in electricity demand caused by Earth Hour in 10 countries, spanning 6 years, and found that the events reduced electricity consumption an average of 4%. The study noted the policy challenge of converting Earth Hour's short-term energy saving into longer-term actions, including sustained changes in behaviour and investment.

== Reception ==
Criticisms of Earth Hour have included the following:

- Some critics point out that the reduction in power consumption during Earth Hour itself is relatively insignificant. The Herald Sun equated the power savings in the Sydney central business district to "taking 48,613 cars off the road for 1 hour". Australian columnist Andrew Bolt pointed out that "A cut so tiny is trivial – equal to taking six cars off the road for a year".
- Other environmentalists have criticized Earth Hour's focus on individual behaviour, when a small number of fossil fuel companies have emitted the vast majority of man-made carbon emissions. Adam McGibbon, writing for The Independent, criticized Earth Hour for releasing fossil fuel companies and politicians from their responsibility to deal with climate change.
- The Christian Science Monitor said that most candles are made from paraffin, a heavy hydrocarbon derived from crude oil, a fossil fuel, and that depending on how many candles a person burns (if one uses candles during Earth Hour), whether or not they normally use compact fluorescent light bulbs, and what source of energy is used to produce their electricity, in some cases, replacing light bulbs with candles will cause an increase, instead of a decrease, in carbon dioxide emissions.
- On March 29, 2009, one day after Earth Hour 2009, Dân Trí Daily News published an editorial expressing concern that many young people chose to drive around the darkened city of Hanoi for fun, exhausting petroleum instead of electricity and resulting in long traffic jams.
- George Marshall of the Climate Outreach Information Network criticized Earth Hour for "playing into the hands of (the critics of environmentalists)," as darkness is symbolic of fear and decay. "The overwhelming need at the moment is to inspire ordinary people with a vision of a better world, to make them feel that action on climate change is utterly desirable and positive.... the cultural resonance (of Earth Hour) couldn't be any worse."
- The Competitive Enterprise Institute has introduced an opposing Human Achievement Hour in celebration of human progress in various fields of industry, including technology, medicine, energy, and more. During this hour, the Institute suggests that people celebrate by using modern technology such as electricity, telecommunications and indoor plumbing.
- In 2009, economist Ross McKitrick criticized the idea, saying, "Abundant, cheap electricity has been the greatest source of human liberation in the 20th century.[...] The whole mentality around Earth Hour demonizes electricity."
- In March 2010, The Daily Telegraph quoted Ross Hayman, head of media relations at the UK National Grid, as saying "it could therefore result in an increase in carbon emissions" due to complications related to rapidly lowering then raising electricity generation.
- In February 2010, Rick Giles, president of ACT on Campus, the youth wing of New Zealand's ACT Party, appeared on the morning television show Sunrise to denounce Earth Hour and instead suggested the celebration of "Edison Hour". He argued that Earth Hour is an "anti-technology" cause, and that people will simply use candles instead, which is undesirable as they are petroleum-based. He argued that if we are heading for some kind of disaster, it makes sense to use technology to combat this. Rick said "I think my argument is so powerful that it's not necessary to talk about it".
- The Ayn Rand Institute wrote: "Participants spend an enjoyable sixty minutes in the dark, safe in the knowledge that the life-saving benefits of industrial civilization are just a light switch away... Forget one measly hour with just the lights off. How about Earth Month... Try spending a month shivering in the dark without heating, electricity, refrigeration; without power plants or generators; without any of the labor-saving, time-saving, and therefore life-saving products that industrial energy makes possible."
- During the 2010 Earth Hour in the city of Uusikaupunki in Finland, a 17-year-old female motorcyclist hit a 71-year-old man, who was walking on the street instead of the sidewalk for an unknown reason. The man died from his injuries, while the motorcyclist and her passenger were uninjured. At the time of the accident, the street lights had been turned off as part of the Earth Hour. The police stated that the lack of street lighting may have played a part in the accident, while the mayor believed the city's street lights would have been too dim to prevent it even if they had been on.

== See also ==
- 88888 Lights Out
- Denmark plants trees
- Earth anthem
- Earth Day
- Earth Strike
- Flick Off
- International Dark Sky Week
- Light pollution
- Planet Relief
