= Air pollution in Hong Kong =

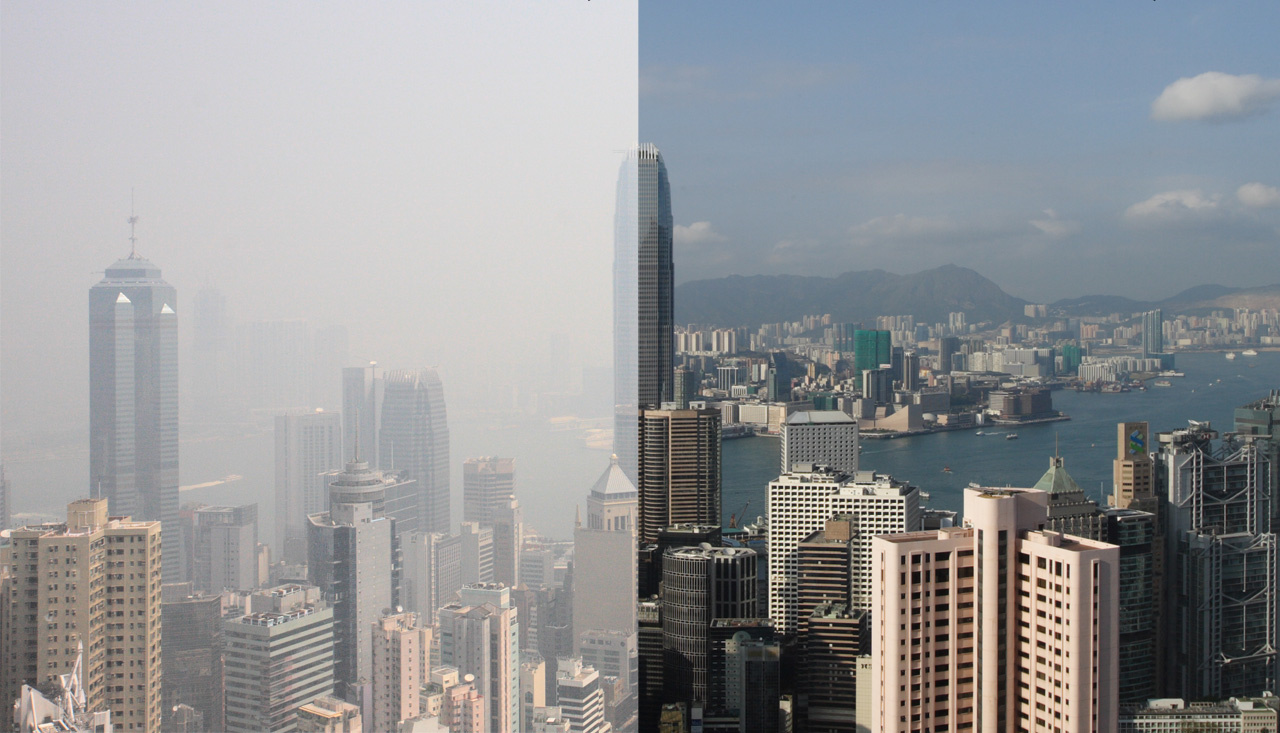
On two cloud-free days, the haze situation differed dramatically from September 2007 (left) to April 2006 (right).

Renovation and building rehabilitation programs are neglected sources of air pollution in Hong Kong.

Air pollution in Hong Kong has been a serious problem since the 2000s. Cases of asthma and bronchial infections have soared due to reduced air quality.

== Background ==
In the 1980s, the labour-intensive industries of Hong Kong faced the problem of increasing land rents and labour costs while the reform and opening up in mainland China provided a favourable condition for building factories there. Mainland China had labour and land and looser pollution control than Hong Kong. Therefore, Hong Kong industrialists took advantage of mainland China's pull factors by relocating their factories there.

Most factories relocated to the Pearl River Delta. The first factories were relocated to mainland China in the late 1970s. The relocation trend reached its peak in the mid-1980s. By the 1990s, over 80% of the factories had been relocated to mainland China. The environment of Hong Kong has improved while that of mainland China is heavily polluted. Consequently, local governments of South China passed laws to restrict industrial pollution.

The relocated factories needed support services including shipping, insurance, and above all, finance. As more people working in the tertiary sector, Hong Kong's economy grew increasingly reliant on service industries.

== Major emission sources ==
The Environmental Protection Department (EPD) published the Hong Kong Air Pollutant Emission Inventory on their website every year since 2000. As of 2022, there are "seven source categories for six major air pollutants, namely: sulphur dioxide (SO_{2}), nitrogen oxides (NO_{x}), respirable suspended particulates (RSP or PM_{10}), fine suspended particulates (FSP or PM_{2.5}), volatile organic compounds (VOC) and carbon monoxide (CO)".

"The emission sources include non-combustion sources, public electricity generation, road transport, navigation, civil aviation, other combustion sources, and hill fires" according to the inventory. Hill fires are considered random in nature by the EPD and are not included in the chart below. In 2022, other combustion sources (e.g., non-road mobile machineries operating in construction sites and container terminals) and non-combustion sources (e.g., for VOC, paints and associated solvents, consumer products and printing; for respirable suspended particulate, i.e., PM10, and fine suspended particulate, i.e., PM2.5, paved road dust, cooking fumes, construction dust and quarry production) are major emission sources for PM2.5, PM10 and VOC (as compared with combustion sources such as public electricity generation, road transport, navigation and civil aviation).

2022 Emission Inventory
- Public Electricity Generation
- Road Transport
- Navigation (transportation over water)
- Civil Aviation
- Other Combustion (e.g., non-road mobile machineries operating in construction sites and container terminals)
- Non-combustion (e.g., for VOC, paints and associated solvents, consumer products and printing; for respirable suspended particulate (PM10) and fine suspended particulate (PM2.5), paved road dust, cooking fumes, construction dust and quarry production
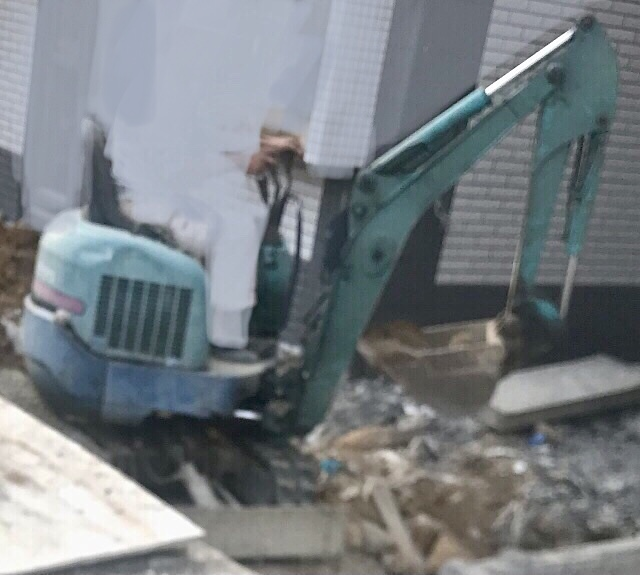
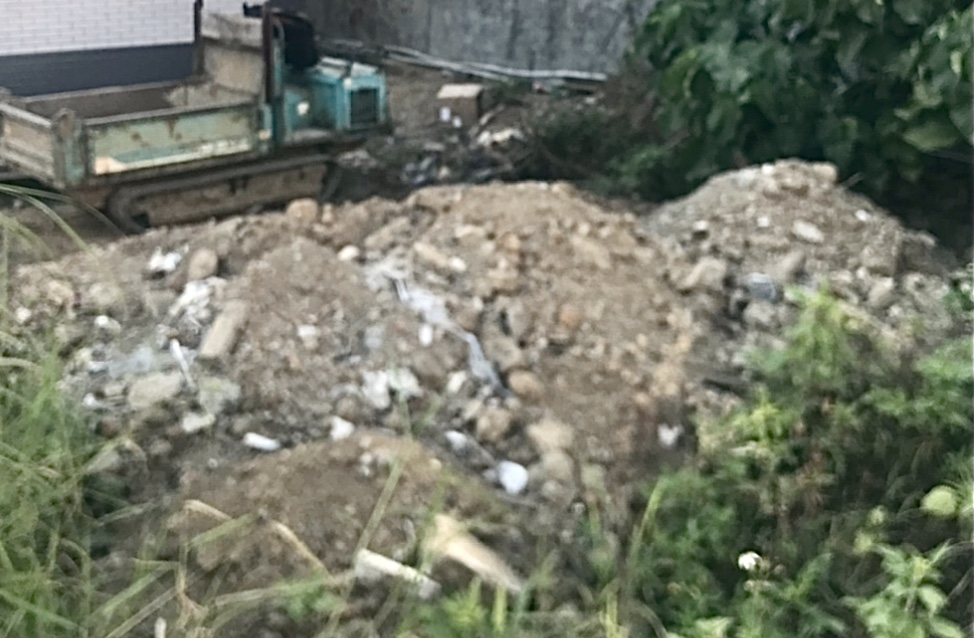
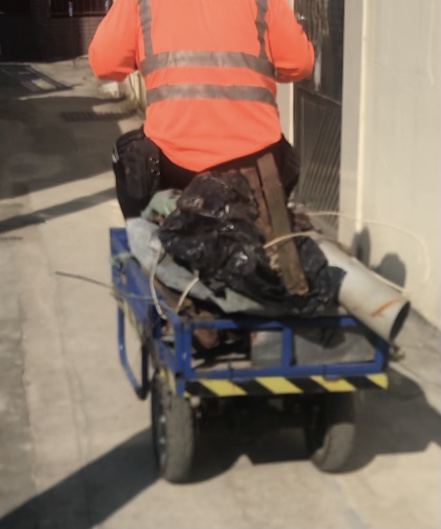
Heavy equipments (non-road mobile machineries) are commonly used in construction and demolition activities in Hong Kong. They use fuels that are different from private cars. Fuel emissions, construction dust/waste, and dust from disturbed soil are sources of air pollution.

Other major air pollutants in Hong Kong include ozone and lead. Ozone can be called a secondary pollutant. Volatile organic compounds (VOCs) react with nitrogen oxides (NOx) to form ozone under sunlight, "which in turn helps the formation of fine particulates. The accumulation of ozone, fine particulates and other gaseous pollutants results in smog that reduces visibility." The production and concentration of ozone depends on the presence of primary pollutants and UV light. "In the presence of volatile organic compounds, high concentrations of ozone are formed. This type of pollution … is termed 'photochemical smog'."

== Effects ==
Declining regional air quality means visibility has also decreased dramatically. In 2004, low visibility occurred 18 per cent of the time, the highest on record, according to the Hong Kong Observatory.

=== Health implications ===
The mortality rate from vehicular pollution can be twice as high near heavily travelled roads, based on a study conducted in the Netherlands at residences 50 metres from a main road and 100 metres from a freeway. Since millions of people in Hong Kong live and work in close proximity to busy roads, this presents a major health risk to city residents. The Hong Kong Medical Association estimates that air pollution can exacerbate asthma, impair lung function and raise the risk of cardio-respiratory death by 2 to 3 per cent for every increase of 10 micrograms per cubic metre of pollutants. Studies by local public health experts have found that these roadside pollution levels are responsible for 90,000 hospital admissions and 2,800 premature deaths every year. In 2009 the Australian government highlighted that air pollution in Hong Kong could exacerbate some medical conditions.

Former Chief Executive Donald Tsang declared that the high life-expectancy of Hong Kong demonstrates that concerns over air quality were not justified.

The life expectancy in Hong Kong is among the highest in the world ... you can come to only one conclusion: we have the most environmental-friendly place for people, for executives, for Hong Kong people to live.

Professor Anthony Hedley, chair of community medicine at Hong Kong University, said: "Tsang is badly advised on current public health issues." Hedley added that air pollution levels in Hong Kong were extremely high, and could affect the lungs, blood vessels and heart. James Tien, former Chairman of the Liberal Party of Hong Kong, retorted, "Can [Tsang] really be confident that, if pollution continues to worsen, will he be able to promise the same life expectancy for our children and for our grandchildren?"

=== Economic impact ===
Even as early as 2000, the total negative impact to the Hong Kong Economy, including cardiorespiratory disease was in excess of HK$11.1 billion. About 1,600 deaths a year might be avoided if air quality improves.

Made aware of fresh statistical and anecdotal evidence that pollution is driving away business and hurting Hong Kong's global competitiveness, James Tien called air pollution "a health issue, a lifestyle issue, a tourism issue, a business issue, and increasingly a political issue".

In 2006, Merrill Lynch downgraded several Hong Kong property companies because of air quality concerns, and there have been warnings from the head of the Stock Exchange that pollution was scaring investors away. It said that the air quality in Hong Kong is now regularly so poor that its "long-term competitiveness is in some doubt".

Pollution is dramatically harming not only the health of citizens of Hong Kong but also its economy, particularly relating to the ability to attract skilled foreign labour.

The chairman of the Danish Chamber of Commerce in Hong Kong said there are people declining offers to work in the Hong Kong offices due to pollution: "It's going to cost us in the future if we don't clean up here."

"Five years ago, air quality wasn't a concern when people considered whether to relocate to Hong Kong", the Chief Executive of Jardine Engineering Corp. said in 2006. "In the past, one of the advantages was clean air. We can no longer say that." A London-based human resources consultant said.

== Causes ==
=== Construction dust and quarry production ===
Construction dust and quarry production are major causes of air pollution in Hong Kong. As of March 2024, there are 1668 construction sites in Hong Kong, around half of them are from private sector and the remaining are from public sector.

=== Concrete plant ===
Concrete batching plants contribute to air pollution in Hong Kong.

=== Materials or wastes not properly covered ===
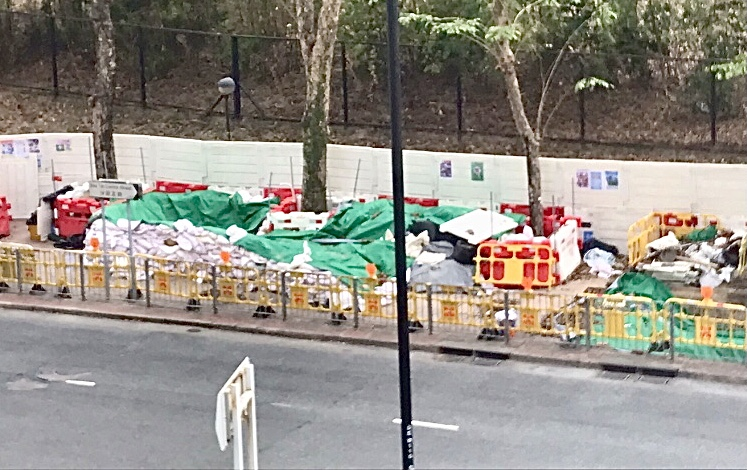
a) Dusty construction waste from roadwork not properly covered
b) Construction and demolition waste causing substantial fugitive dust emission in a densely populated area in Hong Kong

Dusty materials that are not cleaned up or properly covered (e.g. in construction sites and dump trucks) are causes of air pollution in Hong Kong,

"Everyday, hundreds of dump trucks carry all kinds of dusty material from construction sites to public filling barging points. Improper covering of dusty material would result in substantial fugitive dust emissions during road transportation. Consequently, the air quality of Hong Kong, in particular, the total suspended particulate, would be greatly affected."

=== Renovation and refurbishment ===
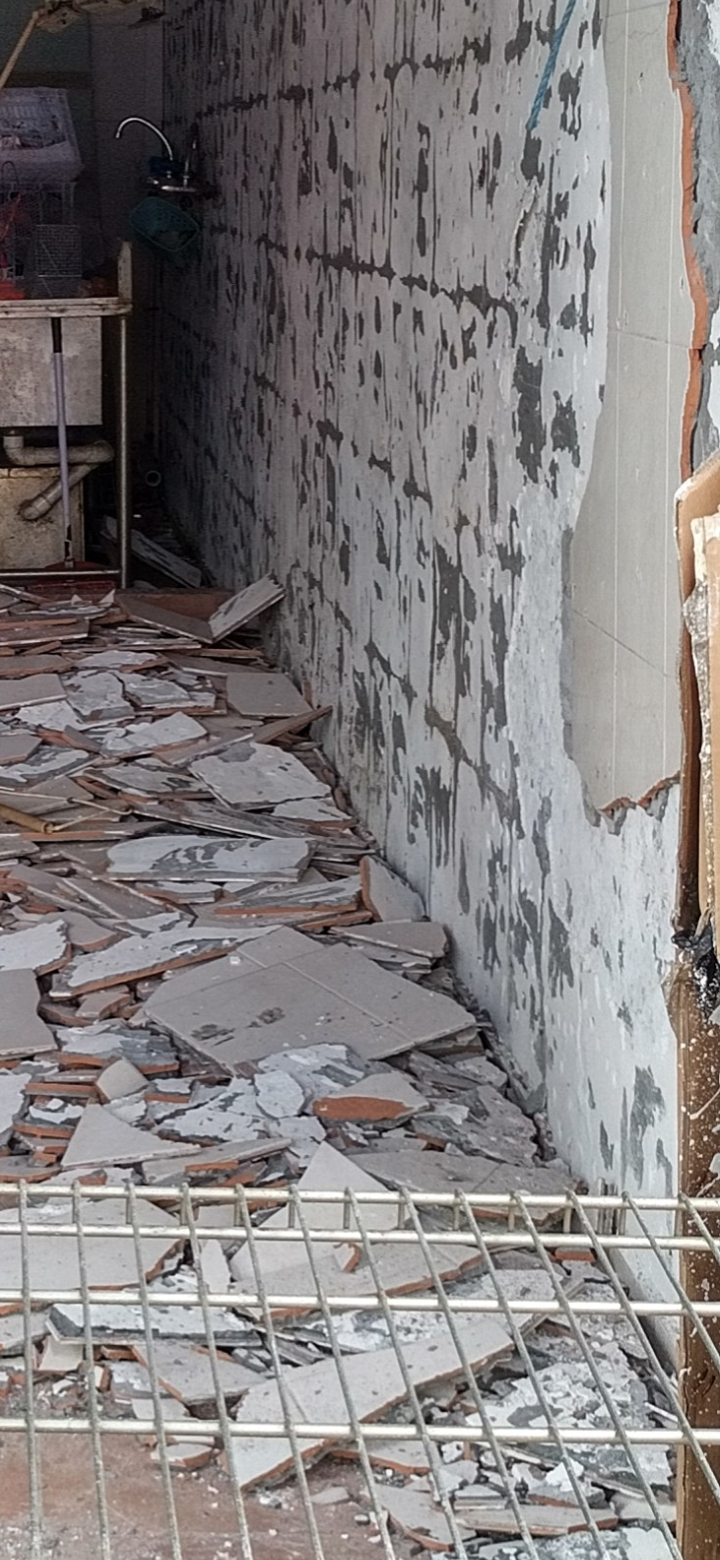
Debris of construction materials inside a shop under renovation

Renovation and refurbishment can emit particulates and other pollutants. A large amount of waste can be generated and result in air pollution. Common pollutants include volatile organic compounds (VOCs) (from solvent-based paints, solvents and adhesives) and dust from cutting, grinding, polishing and sanding materials. There were reports that lead paint was used for renovation in Hong Kong and caused significant ... effects on human.

There are more than two hundred thousand home improvement projects every year in Hong Kong, affecting more than a million residents (population of HK is around 7.5 million in 2023).

=== Unregulated Power Tool Usage ===
The amount of power tool usage in dense urban areas generates a significant amount of air pollution. Angle grinders, wall chasers and grit blasters produce particulates that are finer than PM_{2.5} pollutants.

Some power tools are equipped with dust collection systems (i.e., HEPA vacuum cleaner) or integrated water delivery system which extract the dust after emission.

The usage of power tools can cause adverse effects on people. Power tools can produce large amounts of particulates including ultrafine particles. Use of hand tools can also produce nanoparticle, although the total particle number concentration (PNC) results may be lower than that of using power tools. Plastics are extensively used in the construction and renovation industry. Airborne microplastic dust (a type of particulates) is produced during renovation, building, bridge and road reconstruction projects and the use of power tools. Microplastics is also generated by deterioration of building materials

Particulates are the most harmful form (other than ultra-fines) of air pollution There is no safe level of particulates. Many tasks create dust. High dust levels are created by:

A high dust level example.

- Equipment – using high energy tools, such as cut-off saws, grinders, wall chasers and grit blasters produce a lot of dust in a very short time
- Work method – dry sweeping can make a lot of dust when compared to vacuuming or wet brushing
- Work area – the more enclosed a space, the more the dust will build up
- Time – the longer you work the more dust there will be

Examples of high dust level tasks include:

- using power tools to cut, grind, drill or prepare a surface
- sanding taped plaster board joints
- dry sweeping

Some power tools are equipped with dust collection system (e.g. HEPA vacuum cleaner) or integrated water delivery system which extract the dust after emission.

The use of certain types of power tool such as angle grinder can produce much more harmful sparks and fumes (and particulates) when compared with using reciprocating saw or band saw.

=== Hill fire ===
Hill fire (or wildfire) is a main source of air pollution. According to the Agriculture, Fisheries and Conservation Department (AFCD), major causes of hill fires include joss paper and sticks not extinguished after grace sweepers' worship activities, outdoor barbecuing or cooking, and burning of vegetation and rubbish. "The countryside is therefore prone to high fire risk. Although fires occur in natural environments, almost all are caused by human negligence." To prevent hill fire, the AFCD suggested that weeds around the grave should be cleared by hand-tools, joss paper and sticks should only be burnt in containers, and "never burn rubbish, weeds or grasses".

Wildfires release large amounts of carbon dioxide, black and brown carbon particles, and ozone precursors such as volatile organic compounds and nitrogen oxides (NOx) into the atmosphere. ... Wildfires also emit substantial amounts of semi-volatile organic species that can partition from the gas phase to form secondary organic aerosol (SOA) over hours to days after emission. In addition, the formation of the other pollutants as the air is transported can lead to harmful exposures for populations in regions far away from the wildfires. While direct emissions of harmful pollutants can affect first responders and residents, wildfire smoke can also be transported over long distances and impact air quality across local, regional, and global scales.

Wildfire smoke is composed of combustion products i.e. particulate matter, carbon monoxide, water vapor, carbon dioxide, organic chemicals, nitrogen oxides and other compounds. The smoke and dust from wildfires can also contain gases such as sulfur dioxide and formaldehyde, as well as particulates such as ash and silica. In California high levels of heavy metals, including lead, arsenic, cadmium, and copper were found in the ash debris after wildfires. The concentration of heavy metals in the air of surrounding areas also increased significantly in the hours following a fire.

=== Joss paper and incense burning ===
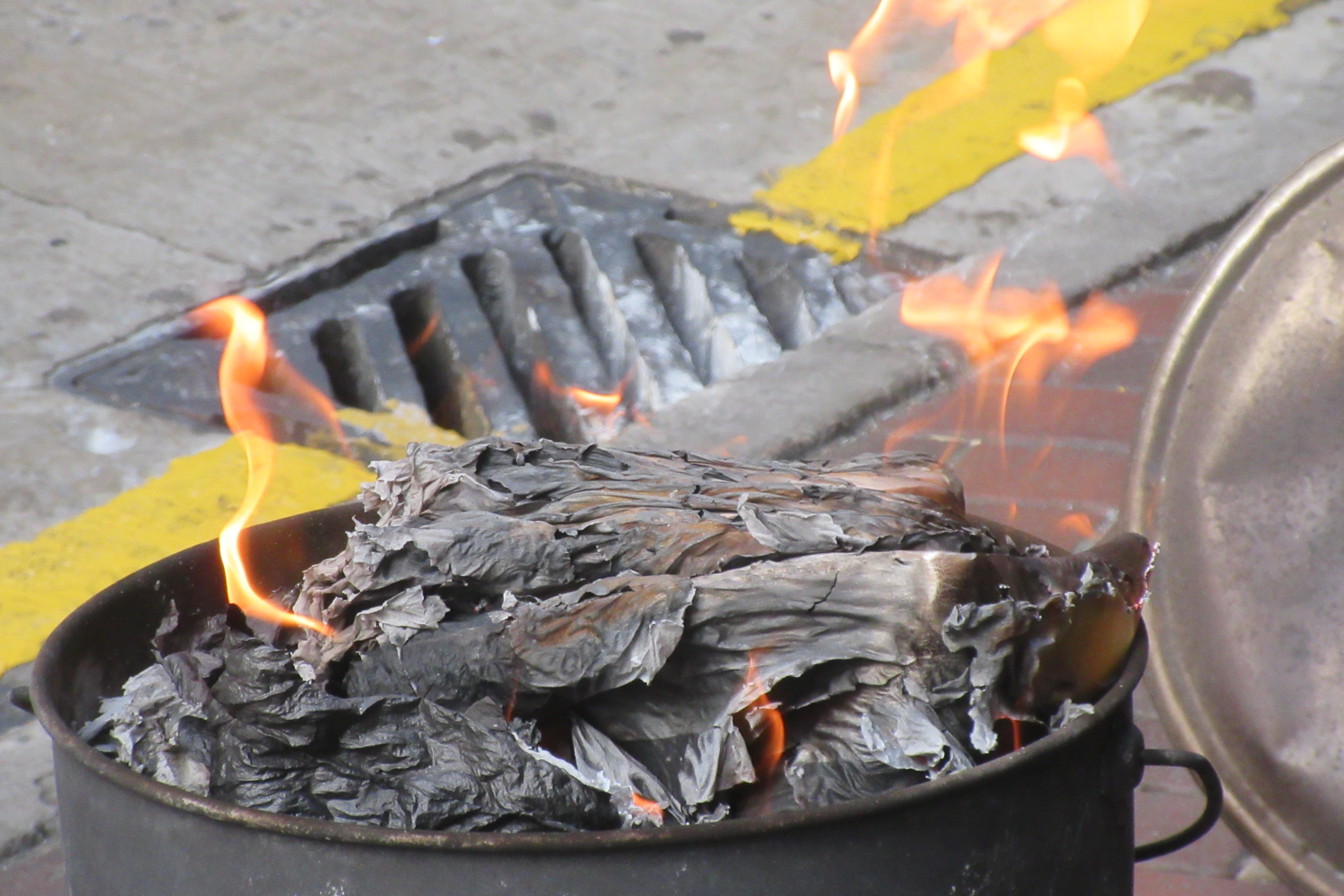
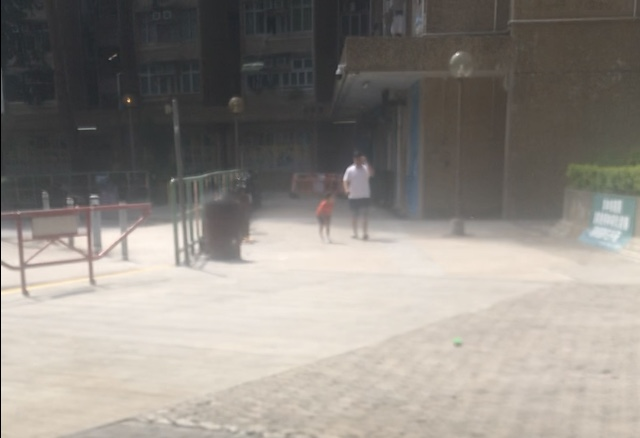
a) Joss paper ash / soot. With wind and dispersion, the size of particulates decreases, while the number of particles increases
b) Two burning containers placed right next to the residential buildings in a public housing estate. Visibility was lowered by the smoke generated from joss paper burning

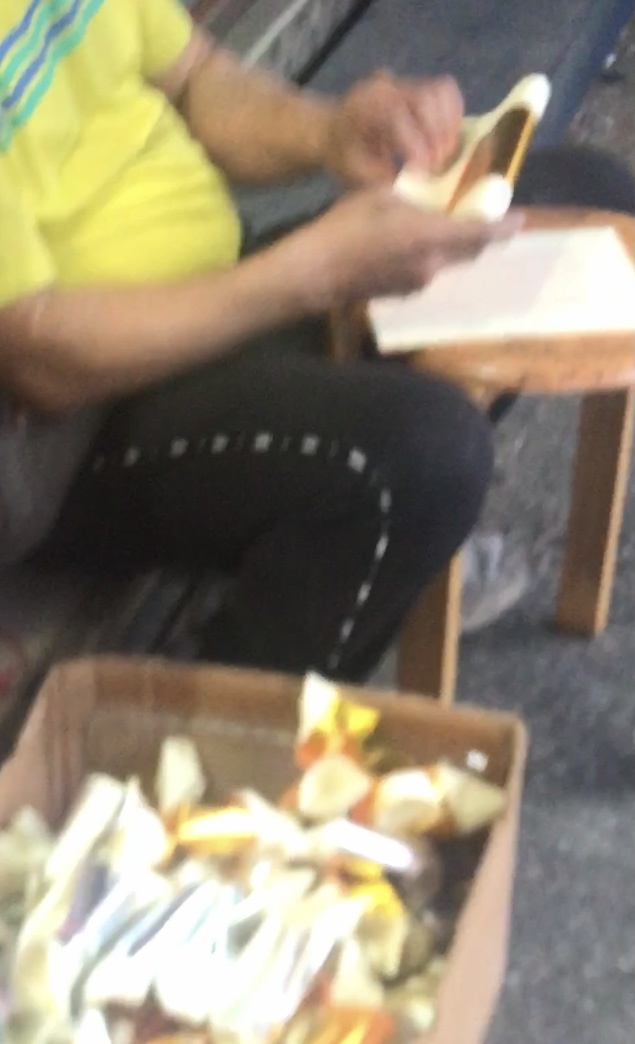
Joss paper being folded into the shape of gold sycee (yuan bao) before it is sold and burned

Burning of joss paper and the soot and ash produced is an important source of air pollution. The amount of pollution (e.g., smoke) produced can vary with the material used to make the joss paper goods.

Analysis of the contents of ash samples from Vietnam and Singapore (as well as the chemical composition of rainwater for the latter) shows that joss paper burning can emit many pollutants detrimental to air quality. There is a significant amount of heavy metals in the dust fume and bottom ash, e.g., aluminium, iron, manganese, copper, lead, zinc and cadmium. A 2017 Taiwan study stated that both indoor and outdoor ambient mercury concentrations increased significantly with worship activities. As of 2014 Taiwan "has the highest density (0.34 temples/km2) of temples in the world". In 2003, researchers in Malaysia sent two joss paper samples (unburnt) to SIRIM to analyse the metallic contents and found that different types of heavy metals such as lead, tin, copper, zinc and arsenic were present.

"Burning of joss paper accounted for up to 42% of the atmospheric rBC [refractory black carbon] mass, higher than traffic (14-17%), crop residue (10-17%), coal (18-20%) during the Hanyi festival in northwest China", according to a 2022 study, "the overall air quality can be worsened due to the practice ... which is not just confined to the people who do the burning," and it is "common in China and most Asian countries with similar traditions."

A research conducted by local university have investigated 366 temples in Hong Kong that have burning activities and found that the levels of PM2.5 (fine particulates) both inside and outside the temples far exceeded air quality standards. "Incense burning in temples, which, despite its significant impact on ambient air pollution, has been largely neglected by the public and is not included in the measurement of air quality index." and can pose significant ... risks to the neighbourhood. It also suggested that better urban planning are needed.

People burn joss paper during many occasions, e.g., Lunar New Year, Ghost Festival, Mid-Autumn Festival, Dongzhi (Winter solstice), Qingming Festival, Chongyang Festival, Dragon Boat Festival, Hanyi Festival, Tin Hau Festival, etc. It is a common practice in public housing estates. In around 2003 the housing authority began to place burning containers in designated open spaces of all public housing estates during festivals for people to burn joss paper, in an attempt to "prevent nuisance" results from tenants burning joss paper and incense outside their flats (e.g., in corridors, stairs, etc.), although such practice by premises operators is now discouraged by the EPD. Other types of worshiping activities suggested by the EPD includes "offering flower and fruit, electronic offering, electronic worshipping, lucky ribbon etc.".

=== Open burning ===
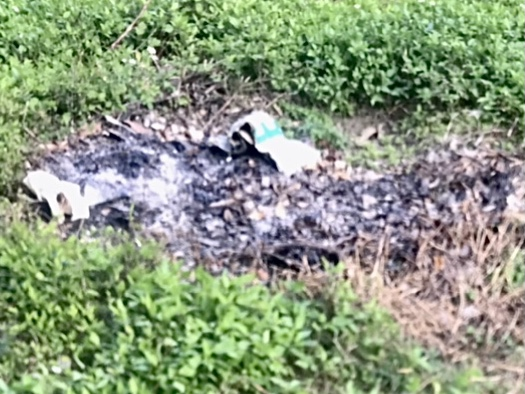
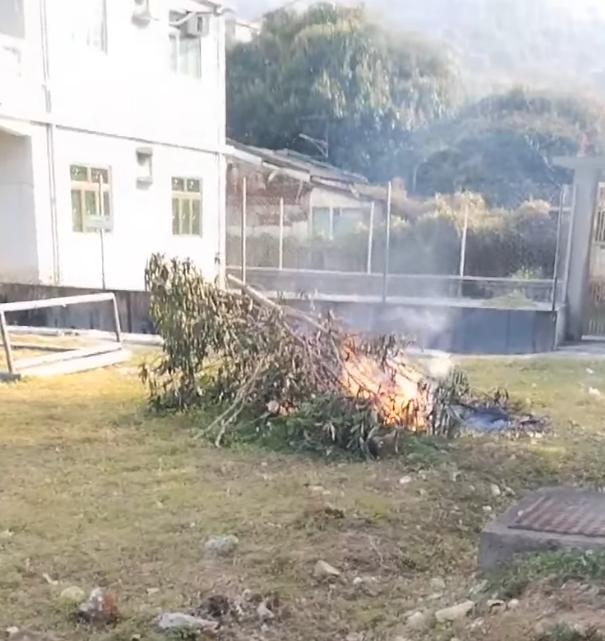
a) Ash left after open burning in New Territories, b) burning of downed vegetation, or "slash"

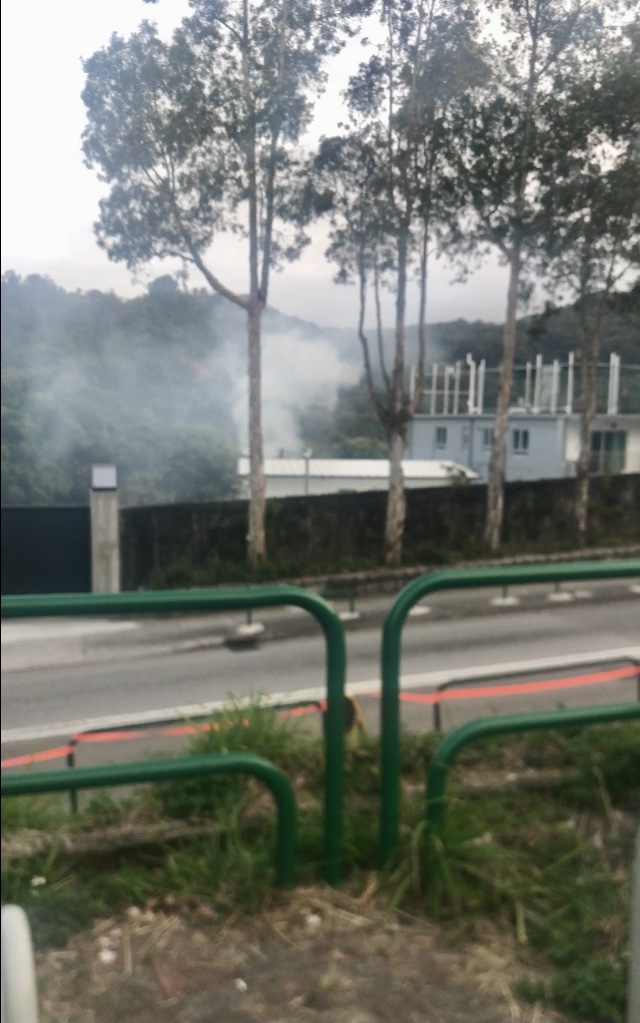
Open burning in New Territories

Opening burning is not uncommon in Hong Kong.

==== Open burning of wastes ====
In Hong Kong, open burning of wastes is illegal and is regulated by the Air Pollution Control Ordinance. Open burning of wastes can generate "excessive emissions of pollutants such as dense and odorous smoke, dust, and toxic fumes".

=== Construction ===
==== Construction sites ====
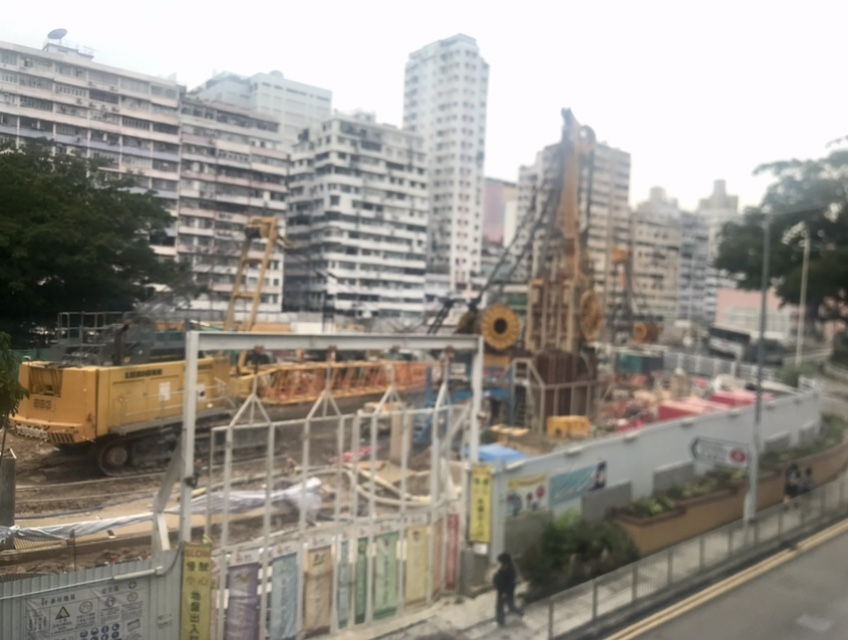
Construction site and heavy equipments in Mong Kok, next to a big shopping mall and residential buildings

A 2017 study from the Hong Kong Polytechnic University stated that "In Hong Kong ... one of the significant pollution and emission sources, heavy construction equipment, powered by diesel engines, emit toxic pollutants including CO, NOx, HC, particulate matter, as well as CO2. Recent regulations on emission compliance for non-road mobile machinery are mainly targeted at equipment newly imported to Hong Kong. Complete replacement of the current stock of 11,300 units working on construction sites will take many years due to their long service lives."

=== Fuel combustion ===
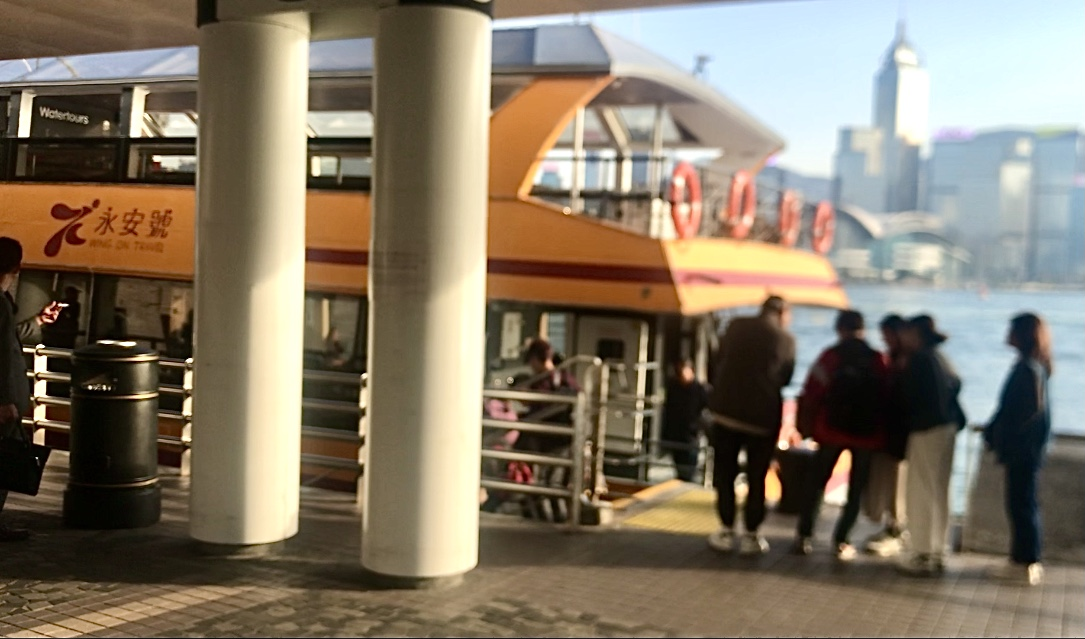
Ship with tourists, Victoria Harbour, Hong Kong, 2024. Pollutants from marine vessels are main sources of air pollution in Hong Kong.

The main cause of air pollution at busy streets are motor vehicles. Diesel exhaust from trucks, buses and light buses is the most concerning as they produce a large amount of particulates and nitrogen oxides (NOx). Pollutants can be trapped between high-rise buildings, making this kind of roadside air pollution more difficult to dissipate.

Marine vessels including cruise liners and container ships are also main contributors to air pollution, emitting pollutants such as sulphur dioxide, nitrogen oxides and particulates. "Local shipowners are being encouraged to install shore-power connectors or convert their vessels to alternative fuels, such as liquefied natural gas (LNG)". Other options such as the use of electric vessels are also being considered.

As per the Clean Air Network, 53% of Hong Kong's pollution comes from local sources – power stations, idling engines of cars, trucks and buses and marine emissions as of 2012. Hong Kong has only 5% of the land of the Pearl River Delta, but it creates 20% of its pollution, far more than its neighbouring cities of Shenzhen and Guangzhou.

A large portion of this pollution comes from coal-fired power stations in Hong Kong and vehicular traffic. A significant contribution wafts down from the tens of thousands of factories in China's neighboring manufacturing heartland of the Pearl River Delta. The two major electricity companies of Hong Kong, namely China Light and Power and HK Electric Holdings emit more than 75,000 tonnes of carbon dioxide into Hong Kong's air daily. At 275 vehicles per kilometer, Hong Kong also has among the highest density of vehicles in the world.

==== Use of illegal fuels ====
In 2023, the number of illegal refuelling stations are increasing, likely due to the higher prices at legal stations.

=== Waste management ===
Landfill, waste incineration, sewage sludge treatment and wastewater treatment (including leachate treatment and sewage treatment) are sources of air pollution in Hong Kong.

=== Fireworks and firecrackers ===
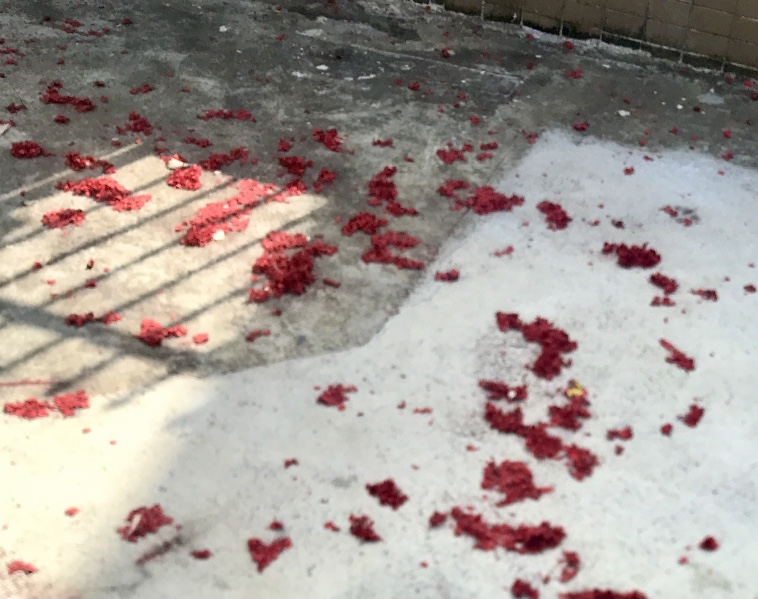
Leftovers of firecrackers in rural Hong Kong (New Territories), Lunar New Year 2025

Fireworks can cause air pollution. Both legal and illegal fireworks are common in Hong Kong, especially during Lunar New Year. Places with legal firework displays include Victoria Harbour and Disneyland. As of 2022, illegal use of fireworks and firecrackers are common, while "illegal possession or discharge of fireworks and firecrackers carries maximum penalty of six months in jail and HK$25,000 fine".

=== Regional ===
Hong Kong's air quality is influenced by regional air pollution.

== Air-quality monitoring ==
=== Air Quality Health Index ===
Air Quality Health Index (AQHI) is the replacement of the Air Pollution Index (API). It provides air pollution information to the public and was introduced on 30 December 2013.

=== Air Pollution Index - EPD ===
The Environmental Protection Department (EPD) in Hong Kong was established to solve problems and provide for a long lasting acceptable level of air quality.

In June 1995, instead of adopting internationally accepted benchmark index for pollution, it set up the Air Pollution Index as an indicator to pollution levels, both "General" and "Roadside".

Air Quality Objectives (AQOs) for seven widespread air pollutants were established in 1987 under the Air Pollution Control Ordinance (APCO), and have not been reviewed since it was set up. It is not clear how the levels are determined.

In October 2005, Task Force on Air Pollution criticised the Government for deluding itself with a pollution index that is a "meaningless" indicator of health risks. Professor Wong Tze-wai, at the Chinese University of Hong Kong commented that the current air pollution index "gives a false sense of security". Gary Wong, a professor at the Chinese University of Hong Kong's Department of Paediatrics and School of Public Health, said that under the current index, "some harmful pollution components aren't even recorded". In addition, he pointed out that there is no strategic plan or a timetable to tackle the problem, unlike in other countries

Street-level air quality regularly falls short of the government's Air Quality Objectives (AQOs), and even further short of the World Health Organization (WHO) Air Quality Guidelines, revised in October.

Academics called for Hong Kong Government to immediately update its air quality objectives set almost twenty years ago. For example, on 19 and 20 November 2006, roadside levels of respirable suspended particulates (RSPs – equivalent to PM_{10}) exceeded the WHO guidelines by at least 300 per cent. Prof Anthony Hedley of the University of Hong Kong said in September 2007 that if Hong Kong's Air Pollution Index was based on WHO recommended levels, our readings would be "absolutely sky high" for most of the year. Secretary for Environment, Transport and Works Sarah Liao Sau-tung said the WHO targets were too stringent.

Air quality monitoring by the department are carried out by 11 general stations and three roadside stations. On 8 March 2012, the department started reporting data on fine suspended particulates in the air on an hourly basis, that are a leading component of smog. It began regular monitoring of PM_{2.5} levels, which measure particles 2.5 micrometres (μm) in diameter or less, at three stations since 2005, but the data were never publicized.

=== Real Air Pollution Index - Greenpeace ===
In September 2008, Greenpeace East Asia's Hong Kong office launched its "Real Air Pollution Index" as part of a campaign to get the government to update the Air Pollution Index to match WHO guidelines. The Real Air Pollution Index reports hourly pollution levels from 15 monitoring stations across the region and compares them to WHO standards?

== Indoor air quality ==
There has been reports of serious air quality problems in government buildings (e.g., legislative council complex and public libraries) and university.

== Actions implemented ==
=== HoHoSkips ===
HoHoSkips is a trade-led pilot scheme funded by the government to aid construction waste collection. It was started in early 2021. "Members of the public and the renovation trade can book, through the mobile application 'HoHoSkips', the services of recyclers to collect small quantities of construction waste generated from renovation works."

=== Tackling power plant emissions ===
To tackle the pollution from power plants, various measures have been taken. Building of new coal-fired generating unit by the two power companies have been banned by the government starting from 1997. New limits (caps) on pollutants emission have also been set by the government to improve air quality since 2008. In order to meet the requirements the two power companies have taken multiple steps, for example, add flue gas desulphurisation (FGD) and denitrification systems for coal-fired units; use more low-emission coal and natural gas when generating electricity; replace old coal-fired units with new gas-fired units; increase "electricity intake from the Daya Bay Nuclear Power Station"; and improve existing gas-fired units to reduce NOx emission and increase thermal efficiency.

=== Switch to cleaner motor fuels ===
All HK taxis and PLBs now run on LPG.

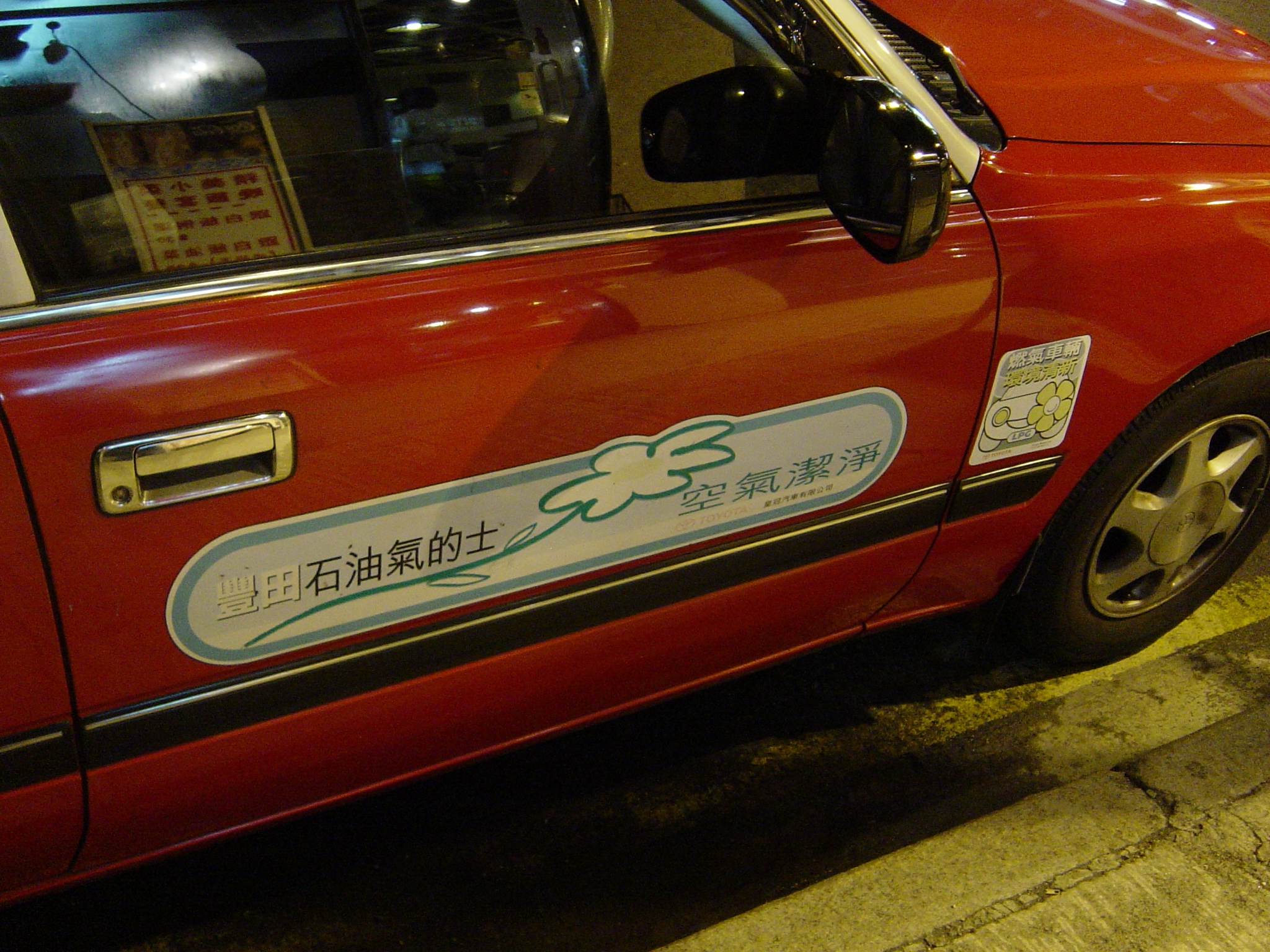
Sign on taxi showing its new LPG status

=== Incentives for scrapping pre-Euro IV vehicles ===
In 2014, an ex gratia payment scheme was introduced to encourage vehicle-owners to scrap about 82,000 pre-Euro VI vehicles. This included a Citybus AEC Routemaster, which attracted controversy for its resulting loss of transport heritage.

== Historical actions discussed ==
=== July 2006 Action Blue Sky Campaign ===
The Action Blue Sky Campaign was an environmental campaign organised by the Environmental Protection Department, and launched by Chief Executive Donald Tsang in July 2006. Its campaign slogan in Chinese was "全城投入 為藍天打氣" ("Let all of the city join in to fight for a blue sky"), while its campaign slogan in English is "Clean Air for a Cool Hong Kong!" The campaign hoped to win support from the public as well as the business community, including those businesses investing in the Pearl River Delta Region.

=== November 2007 vehicle idling ban ===
In November 2007, the government launched a public consultation on the proposal which would impose a fixed penalty of HK$320 on drivers who would violate a ban on idling, with taxi and minibus drivers likely to bear the brunt of the ban. The government said its action is due to the failure of motorists to heed many past campaigns switch off engines while waiting. Taxi and minibus drivers were opposed to the proposal.

It is illegal for any driver to leave their engine running if they get out of their vehicle. The courts have been awarding fines of HK$700. It is also illegal for taxis to loiter and minibuses to stop longer than necessary to pick up or put down passengers. It is also illegal to park anywhere except in a designated parking place. This means that the vast majority of drivers who idle their engines are already in violation of at least one existing traffic safety law.

However, traffic wardens are under strict policy guidelines not to give out any tickets unless there has already developed a "serious" obstruction of the roadway or there have been multiple complaints made by the public; this is the "Selective Traffic Enforcement Policy" (STEP).

Traffic safety policing of idling vehicles, therefore, falls to private organisations like "mini spotters" who act as volunteer traffic wardens, making statements to police that can be prosecuted without traffic wardens having to issue tickets directly to the transport trade.

=== 2008–09 Budget measures ===
In the 2008–09 Budget, Financial Secretary John Tsang proposed a 100 per cent profit tax deduction for capital expenditure on environmentally friendly machinery and equipment in the first year of purchase, to encourage the business community to go green. He also suggested shortening the depreciation period of this equipment from the usual 25 years to 5 years. Neither proposal was actually passed.

=== New goals for 2014 ===
In January 2014, Secretary for the Environment Edward Yau Tang-wah announced that the HK government would update its air quality objectives, put in place in 1990, bringing them closer to WHO guidelines. According to the proposals, which will be set through legislation but have yet to be approved, seven types of emissions will be monitored. Respirable and fine particulates will also be monitored, but less stringently due to their more pronounced health impact. Targets set for three of the seven environmental pollutants are to be based on the WHO's loosest interim targets. Sulphur dioxide, nitrogen dioxide, carbon monoxide and lead would be subject to monitoring. Monitoring of particulates smaller than 2.5 μm (PM_{2.5}) would be introduced under the proposals, but will be loosest of the three WHO interim targets. Yau asserted some local pollution had roots in mainland China, but did not mention any ongoing dialogue to address the issue with mainland authorities. Yau also did not address roadside pollution in Hong Kong. In total, 22 measures in all were suggested to contribute towards meeting the new objectives. Such measures would include phasing out heavily polluting vehicles, promoting hybrid or electric vehicles, and increasing the use of natural gas, but no actions have yet to be taken. Environmental impact assessments of projects such as the Hong Kong-Zhuhai-Macau bridge were conducted and approved under the old air-quality guidelines. Mike Kilburn from Civic Exchange and Professor Hedley of the University of Hong Kong expressed their disappointment, saying that it too little, and too long overdue. Kilburn said: "It is a move that we have been waiting years for but we are extremely disappointed as the objectives are not strict enough to make any positive impact on air quality." Other environmental activists shared little hope in government efforts to reduce pollution and lamented the half-hearted implementation of measures, and the elusiveness of timetable for meeting the most stringent objectives.

== See also ==
- Brain health and pollution
- Clear waters and green mountains
- Heavy metals (e.g., present in lead paint dust, welding fumes, certain types of fuel, microplastics, electronic wastes, ash from wildfire and joss paper burning, etc.)
- Microplastics#Construction and renovation
- Substance-induced psychosis
