= Green Schools Campaign =

American renewable energy non-profit organization

The Green Schools Campaign (GSC) is a Los Angeles-based non-profit organization designed to help schools transition to renewable energy. It was founded in 2020 by Simon Aron, Calum Worthy, and Michael Zelniker and has operated using an online-only model throughout its existence. It is currently led by Executive Director Lily Morse, Operations Directors Ghazal Mirzazadeh and Ava Acevedo, Engagement and Intake Director Angeline Aloysius, and Communications Director Natalia Armenta. The Climate Reality Project is the parent organization of the Green Schools Campaign.

== Mission ==
The Green Schools Campaign works to transition schools across the globe to 100% clean, renewable energy, by giving students the tools, encouragement, and support to directly lead change in their own communities and combat the climate crisis.

This student-led initiative first began when, in 2019, a coalition spearheaded by former Vice President Al Gore's Climate Reality LA chapter lobbied Los Angeles Unified School District to commit to transitioning to 100% clean, renewable energy. The coalition eventually succeeded, with unanimous support from the school board. LAUSD is now committed to full renewable energy by 2035. Given that LAUSD is the 2nd largest school district in the United States, this success was a big deal. Youth and adults from Southern California then realized this success could be used as a template for other schools and districts trying to transition to renewable energy. That was when the Green Schools Campaign was founded.

Since its launch on 2 August 2020, the Green Schools Campaign has expanded over 13 countries, with over 45 active schools, involving more than 110 students in the process. The organization consists of 6 directors, 9 region coordinators, 3 leads, 1 researcher, 2 graphic design and video-makers, and over 20 members that make up the various teams of the organization.

=== Green Schools Campaign in the News ===
Engagement and Intake Director Angeline Aloysius recently had her Op-Ed published in the San Diego Union Tribune, highlighting the steps she was taking to transition her school district and how other youth could do the same at their own schools.

Press Lead Riley Brown writes blog posts for the Green Schools Campaign.
