= Action Blue Sky Campaign =

Environmental campaign

- The logo of the Action Blue Sky Campaign
- Traditional Chinese: 藍天行動
- Simplified Chinese: 蓝天行动
- Jyutping: Laam^{4} Tin^{1} Hang^{4} Dong^{6}
- Hanyu Pinyin: Lántiān Xíngdòng
Transcriptions
Standard Mandarin
- Hanyu Pinyin: Lántiān Xíngdòng
Yue: Cantonese
- Jyutping: Laam^{4} Tin^{1} Hang^{4} Dong^{6}

The Action Blue Sky Campaign was an environmental campaign in Hong Kong, organised by the Environmental Protection Department, to clean up the city's air pollution. It was officially launched by Chief Executive Donald Tsang on July 25, 2006. The campaign slogan in Chinese was "全城投入 為藍天打氣" (All of the city participates to fight for a blue sky), while the campaign slogan in English was "Clean Air for a Cool Hong Kong!" The campaign sought to win support from the public and business community, including businesses investing in the Pearl River Delta Region.

== Background ==
By the mid-2000s, air pollution had become a serious public health and economic concern in Hong Kong. Cases of asthma and bronchial infections had soared due to reduced air quality. Research by the University of Hong Kong School of Public Health estimated that air quality improvement to World Health Organization guideline levels could avoid over 1,300 deaths, 60,000 hospital bed days, and 6.7 million doctor visits for respiratory complaints each year, with direct costs and productivity losses avoided of over US$240 million annually.

The pollution crisis was driven by multiple factors including emissions from diesel vehicles, coal-fired power stations, and transboundary pollution from factories in the Pearl River Delta. In November 2006, Merrill Lynch downgraded several Hong Kong property companies including Hongkong Land, Great Eagle, and Hysan Development because of air quality concerns, with analyst Spencer White writing that "the air quality in Hong Kong is now regularly so poor that the long-term competitiveness of this city is, in our minds, in some doubt."

The campaign was part of broader efforts by the Hong Kong and Guangdong governments to address regional air quality. Earlier in 2003, the two governments had established the PRD Regional Air Quality Management Plan, and the Pearl River Delta Regional Air Quality Monitoring Network commenced operation in late 2006.

== Launch ==
The Action Blue Sky Campaign was officially launched at a ceremony on July 25, 2006, presided over by Chief Executive Donald Tsang. Tsang emphasised the need for community-wide participation to combat air pollution, stating that "every small step taken by each individual to support the clean-air initiatives in our daily lives can help reduce air pollution."

At the ceremony, Tsang announced a goal of reducing electricity consumption in government offices by at least 1.5% and urged the private sector to implement energy-saving measures, including dressing down in summer. He noted that setting air-conditioners to 25.5 degrees Celsius could save approximately one billion units of electricity each year. Seventeen schools and 13 corporations pledged to implement green measures at their premises to conserve energy and help reduce air pollution.

Also officiating at the ceremony were Dr. Sarah Liao, Secretary for the Environment, Transport and Works; Dr. Michael Chiu Tak-lun, Acting Permanent Secretary for the Environment, Transport and Works (Environment); and Mr. Lai Sze-hoi, Director of the Electrical and Mechanical Services Department.

Tsang indicated that Hong Kong and Guangdong were studying measures to improve air quality and hoped to provide a public account of discussions at the Ninth Plenary of the Hong Kong/Guangdong Co-operation Joint Conference to be held in Guangzhou the following month.

== Public service announcements ==
The campaign featured two 30-second public service announcements broadcast on television and radio beginning July 25, 2006. Dr. Sarah Liao appeared in the announcements, speaking about regional co-operation to combat air pollution and how individuals could help improve air quality at the personal level.

== Activities ==
=== Public education ===
Beginning in August 2006, roving exhibitions with quiz booths on air pollution were set up across Hong Kong's 18 districts to educate the public. Publicity materials including posters and leaflets were distributed.

The Advisory Committee on the Environment held a workshop in September 2006 on the review of Air Quality Objectives, inviting green groups and academics to join the discussion.

The Environmental Campaign Committee worked with District Councils and green groups to reinforce environmental messages, encouraging people to set air-conditioning to 25.5 degrees Celsius, use energy-efficient products, switch off idling engines, and reduce consumption of products containing volatile organic compounds.

=== School initiatives ===
Several initiatives targeted students to educate them on air pollution issues:

- The Hong Kong Green School Awards and Hong Kong Green Pre-School Awards were given in September 2006 to promote energy efficiency and conservation.
- The Student Environmental Protection Ambassadors Scheme was launched in October 2006 to promote green messages at schools.
- School-based competitions were organised to educate students about air pollution.

=== Business engagement ===
The Environmental Campaign Committee awarded the Hong Kong Eco-business Award in September 2006 to highlight the role and contributions of the business community in saving energy and reducing air pollution.

A seminar was held in late November 2006 to showcase best environmental practices in business and industrial operations, aimed at enhancing environmental awareness among the local business community.

== Reception ==
The campaign received criticism from some quarters for lacking concrete regulatory action. Writing in the South China Morning Post shortly after the launch, one commentator argued that the campaign focused too heavily on public consultation rather than immediate measures, noting that indirect costs from air pollution were projected at more than HK$20 billion per year with over 1,500 premature deaths annually.

Several months into the campaign, critics noted that Hong Kong remained "trapped below the greyest autumn skies," with ongoing concerns about respirable suspended particulates and their health effects. Professor Anthony Hedley of the University of Hong Kong noted in September 2007 that if Hong Kong's Air Pollution Index was based on WHO recommended levels, readings would be "absolutely sky high" for most of the year.

In November 2007, the government launched a public consultation proposing a fixed penalty of HK$320 on drivers who violated a ban on engine idling, acknowledging the failure of past campaigns to encourage motorists to switch off engines while waiting.

== See also ==
- Air pollution in Hong Kong
- Environmental organisation
- Lights Out Hong Kong
- Pearl River Delta Regional Air Quality Monitoring Network
