= Flick Off =

Advertising campaign against climate change in Canada

FLICK OFF is a Canadian advertising campaign launched by Key Gordon Communications. It is a movement to fight climate change by getting Canadians to use less energy.

Its sponsors include MuchMusic, Roots Canada, Environmental Defence Canada and the Government of Ontario. Some view this program as a continuation of the scrapped program One-Tonne Challenge.

The motivation for the campaign is both to reduce energy consumption for its own sake and also with the aim of reducing carbon emissions to combat global warming.

The website associated with the campaign is aimed at young Canadians. The website contains educational material about causes and consequences of global warming and strategies for reducing carbon emissions, and includes a "carbon calculator" called One Less Tonne to measure individual carbon dioxide emissions.

The website was launched by British entrepreneur Richard Branson and Ontario Environment Minister Laurel Broten in Toronto on April 25, 2007.

According to the official website, the campaign is now in "hibernation".

== Choice of name ==
The ambiguity between "flick off" and "fuck off" is reflected in the items for sale as part of the campaign, and in the website which features phrases like "are we flicked?". The power symbol may also represent a raised middle finger.

The choice was criticized by several Ontario opposition politicians. Peter Kormos of the NDP said "It's silly, it's embarrassing, and clearly it's an ad agency that has a bunch of flickin' amateurs as employees." Ontario premier Dalton McGuinty responded that "if people want to take offence at something, don't take offence at the "flick off" campaign. Take offence at the fact that we are, as a species, raising the temperature on our planet." Toronto Sun lifestyle columnist and Burlington city council candidate Marianne Meed Ward responded that the debate over words was the privilege of the rich and pampered.

== See also ==
- 88888 Lights Out
- Earth Hour
