= Planet Relief =

Proposed BBC television special

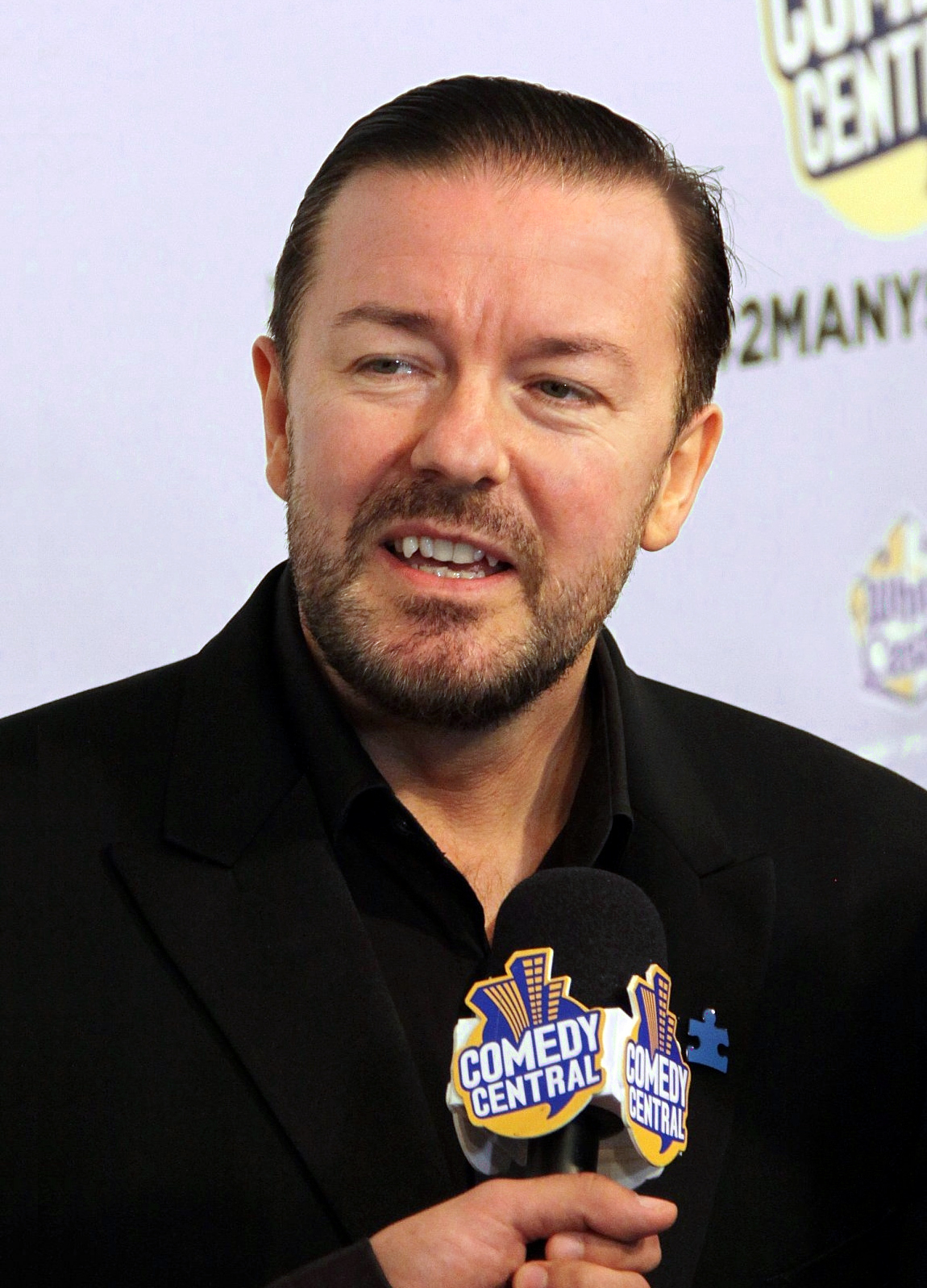
Comedian Ricky Gervais is believed to have been one of the people involved with Planet Relief.

Planet Relief was a proposed BBC television special dealing with the issue of global warming, originally scheduled for broadcast in January 2008. The programme, which had been in development for 18 months, was meant to be similar to previous BBC programmes such as Comic Relief and Sport Relief. However, it was cancelled before it was broadcast, allegedly because the BBC was concerned that it would be "biased" towards promoting responses based on acceptance of mainstream climate change science.

== Concept ==
The original idea for Planet Relief was to increase awareness of climate change. The show, unlike previous BBC specials such as Comic Relief, was not planned to be a charity event, but to increase awareness, similar to Live Earth. It was mainly inspired by Live 8, with Planet Relief seen as its climate change counterpart. The programme would have involved an electric power station being shut down for one night, for which the BBC had spent over a year negotiating, urging viewers "to turn off all unnecessary lights and electric gadgets for the evening."

== Cancellation ==
The BBC scrapped the idea for Planet Relief on 5 September 2007. Peter Barron, editor of Newsnight said, "It is absolutely not the BBC's job to save the planet." Peter Horrocks, head of BBC television news said, "It is not the BBC's job to lead opinion or proselytise on this or any other subject." There were also concerns that the power station shutdown "might overload parts of the [electricity distribution] network." The BBC did not, however, say that the show was cancelled due to bias, stating rather that, "The BBC is committed to programmes about climate change but after Live Earth what audiences say is they are looking for programmes of a documentary or factual nature to explain the complex subject."

Right wing commentators opposed the idea of Planet Relief. Complaints about the programme also came from climate deniers such as Martin Durkin, who said, "The thing that disturbs me most is that the BBC has such a leviathan position … that if it decides that it is going to adopt climate change as a moral purpose, I have got a lot of trouble with that. I don't think it is the role of the BBC to spend my money on a moral purpose."

Climate change activists criticised the BBC for cancelling the programme. Author Mark Lynas said, "This decision shows a real poverty of understanding among senior BBC executives about the gravity of the situation we face. The only reason why this became an issue is that there is a small but vociferous group of climate 'sceptics' lobbying against taking action, so the BBC is behaving like a coward and refusing to take a more consistent stance."

Another critic, Friends of the Earth executive director Tony Juniper, said, "This is a very disappointing decision considering the huge potential for the BBC in helping us more quickly make the shift toward a low-carbon society. The science of climate change is very clear and if approached in the right way taking up this very serious issue would not compromise the BBC's impartiality."

== See also ==
- Media coverage of climate change
- BBC controversies
- Criticism of the BBC
- List of television series cancelled before airing an episode
- Media bias
- Denmark plants trees
