= 88888 Lights Out =

2008 campaign against global warming in India

88888 Lights Out was a campaign with the stated goal of increasing awareness of global warming and promoting actions to reduce energy consumption. By encouraging India's residents to turn out the lights for eight minutes and to become more aware of environmental concerns, the organisers sought to limit greenhouse gas emissions and reduce pollution of the globe.

== Campaign organisation ==
The campaign was started by Exnora International, a non-governmental organisation in India. It called for people to switch off their lights for eight minutes at 8 p.m. on August 8, 2008 (8-8-8-8-8) to spread awareness and take action to reduce energy consumption and the resulting environmental damage.

In the city of Chennai, Governor Surjit Singh Barnala ordered the lights off in Raj Bhavan at 8 p.m. for 8 minutes and said that an awakening should be created among the people of all walks of life on the root cause of global warming, it occurred at the very beginning of the 2008 Olympics.

The effort has been part of a wider effort by the groups involved to bring attention to environmental issues.

== See also ==
- FLICK OFF
- Earth Hour
