= Denmark plants trees =

2019 Danish telethon event

Denmark plants trees (Danish: Danmark planter træer) was a Danish TV telethon held on Saturday, 14 September 2019, which was aimed at raising funds for planting one million new trees in Denmark to inspire Danes to participate in climate action. The event is widely regarded as the world's first telethon to fight the climate crisis.

The event was broadcast live over 2½ hours on the Danish television station TV 2 from Skovtårnet in Haslev. During the event, there were musical performances and famous guests. Danish Prime Minister Mette Frederiksen planted one of the first trees. The telethon raised funds sufficient for planting 914,233 trees, nearly reaching the stated goal of one million trees. Two weeks later, the goal of one million trees was reached after it was decided to keep the online donation website open.

The format was developed by the Danish TV production company Tiki Media, which expressed hope that the event would spread to other countries in order to engage the public on the climate issue.

The trees were planted by the Danish organisation Growing Trees Network in collaboration with the Danish Society for Nature Conservation.

The event inspired the 2021 Dutch TV series Netherlands plants trees (Dutch: Nederland plant bomen), which aired on NPO 1 and was hosted by Bert van Leeuwen. The TV series raised 500,000 euros, which led to the planting of 65,371 trees in the Netherlands.
