= Grammy Award for Best Global Music Album =

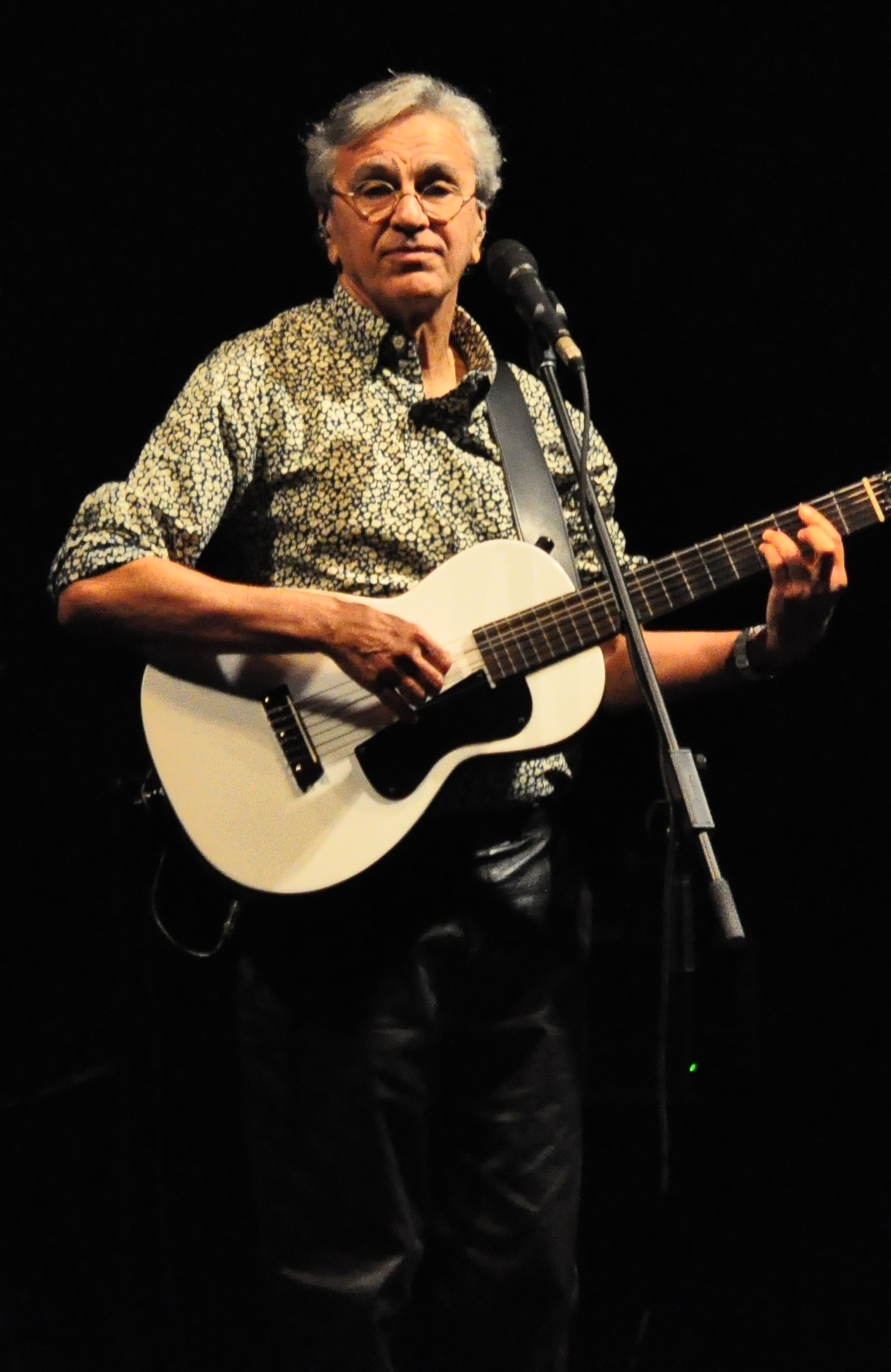
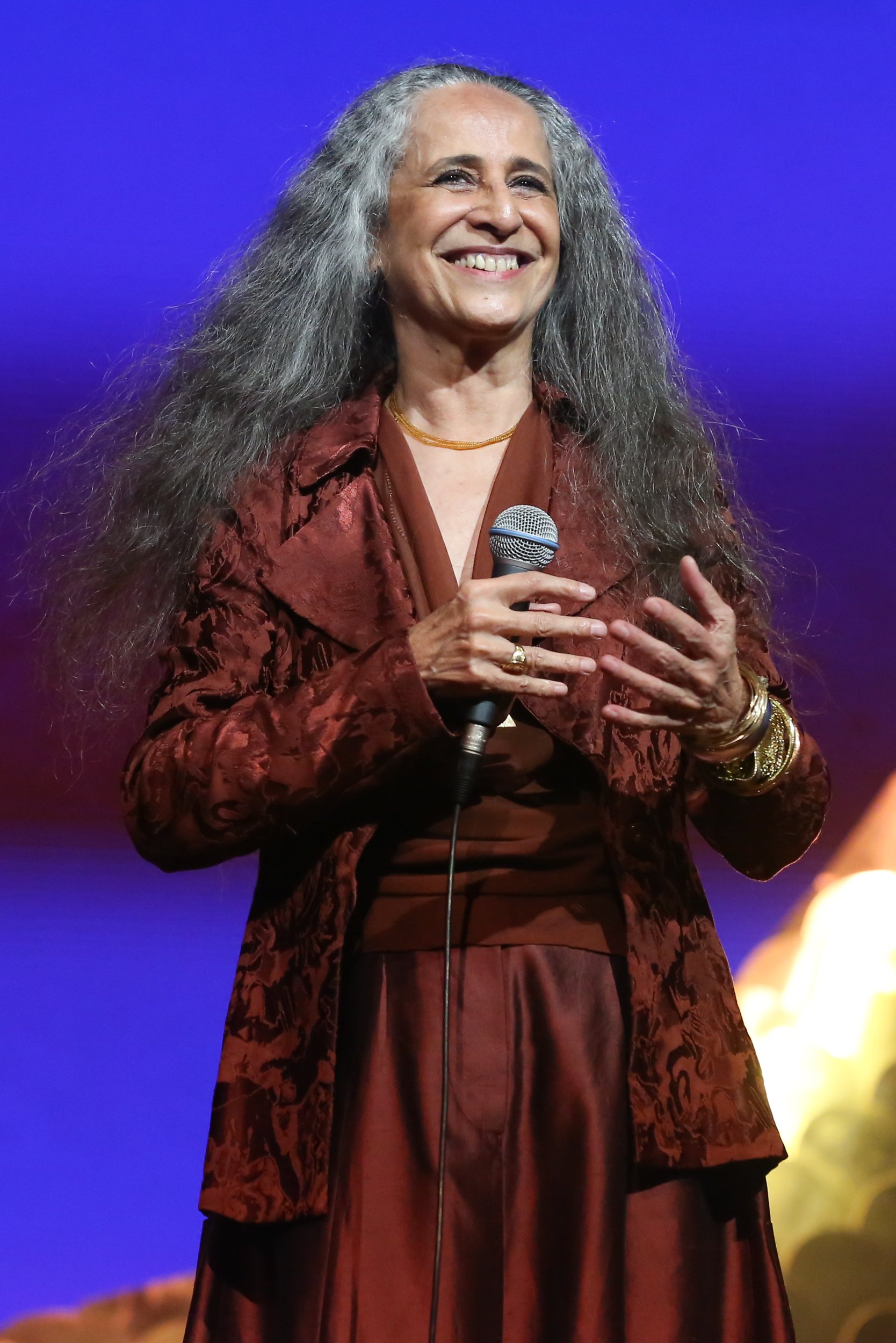
- Caetano e Bethânia Ao Vivo by Caetano Veloso and Maria Bethânia is the most recent recipient
- Awarded for: Influential music from around the globe
- Country: United States
- Presented by: National Academy of Recording Arts and Sciences
- First award: 1992
- Currently held by: Caetano Veloso & Maria Bethânia – Caetano e Bethânia Ao Vivo (2026)
- Website: grammy.com

The Grammy Award for Best Global Music Album is an honor presented to recording artists for influential music from around the globe at the Grammy Awards, a ceremony that was established in 1958 and originally called the Gramophone Awards. Honors in several categories are presented at the ceremony annually by the National Academy of Recording Arts and Sciences of the United States to "honor artistic achievement, technical proficiency and overall excellence in the recording industry, without regard to album sales or chart position".

== History ==
The award for Best Global Music Album, reserved for international performers exhibiting "non-European, indigenous traditions", was first presented to Mickey Hart in 1992 for the album Planet Drum. In 1996, Academy trustees attempted to solve the problem of "compressing 75% or more of the world's music into a single award category" by broadening the definition of "world music" to include non-Western classical music. Beginning in 2001, award recipients included the producers, engineers, and/or mixers associated with the nominated work in addition to the recording artists. Following the 45th Grammy Awards (2003), the award was split into two separate categories for Best Traditional World Music Album and Best Contemporary World Music Album. In 2012, the two categories were merged back to Best World Music Album. In 2020, The Recording Academy announced it would be changing the name of the category to Best Global Music Album.

Angelique Kidjo has won the category the most, with five wins (four of which have been since 2016). The second group to win most often is Ladysmith Black Mambazo, who have won four times during the combined history of Global/World categories. Soweto Gospel Choir have three wins in the Global/World categories. In the single merged category, Ravi Shankar and Ry Cooder have both won twice. Angelique Kidjo also has the most nominations in the combined Global/World history with twelve additional nominations. Anoushka Shankar has the second most nominations in the combined categories with nine nominations.

In the single, merged Global category, artists from Brazil have won the most times with five wins, the USA have won four times, Benin has also won on four occasions, India and South Africa each have three wins, Mali and France have both had artists win twice.

== Recipients ==
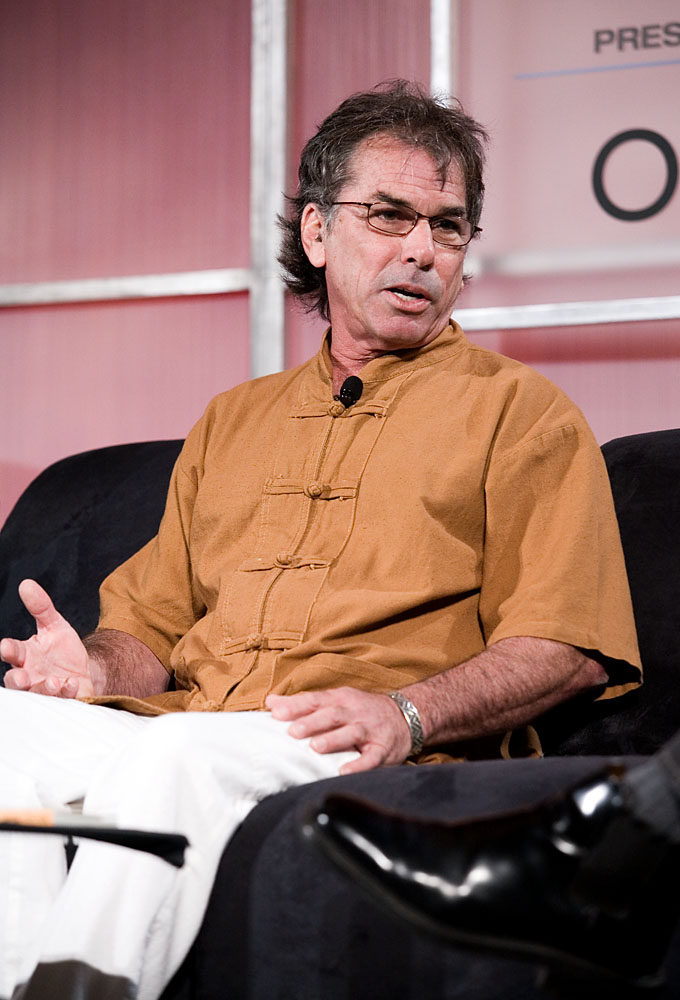
Mickey Hart, the first award recipient (1992), at the Web 2.0 Conference in 2005

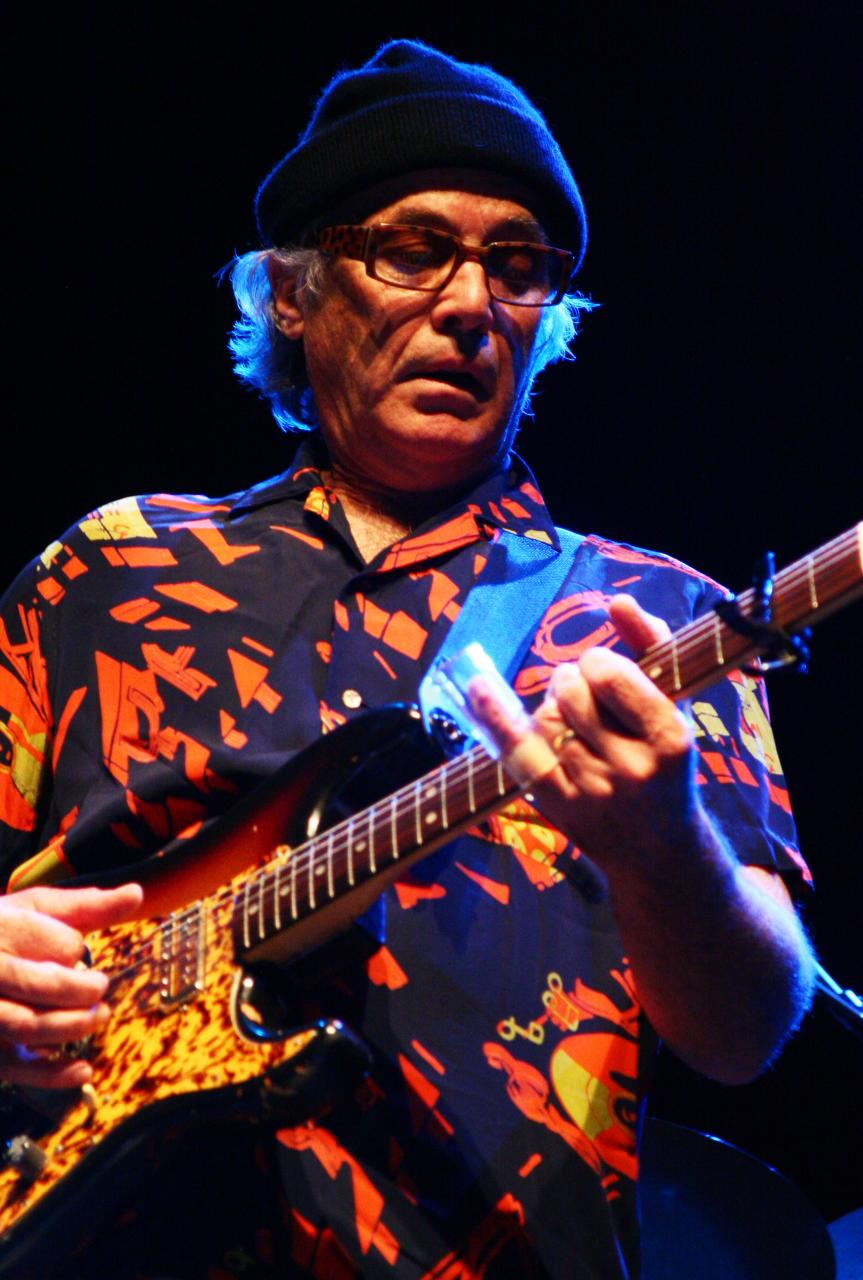
Two-time award recipient Ry Cooder performing in 2009

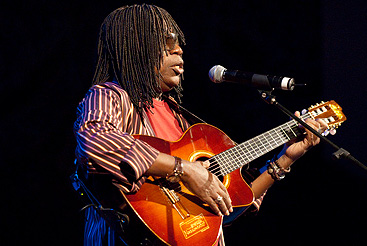
1998 award winner Milton Nascimento in 2008

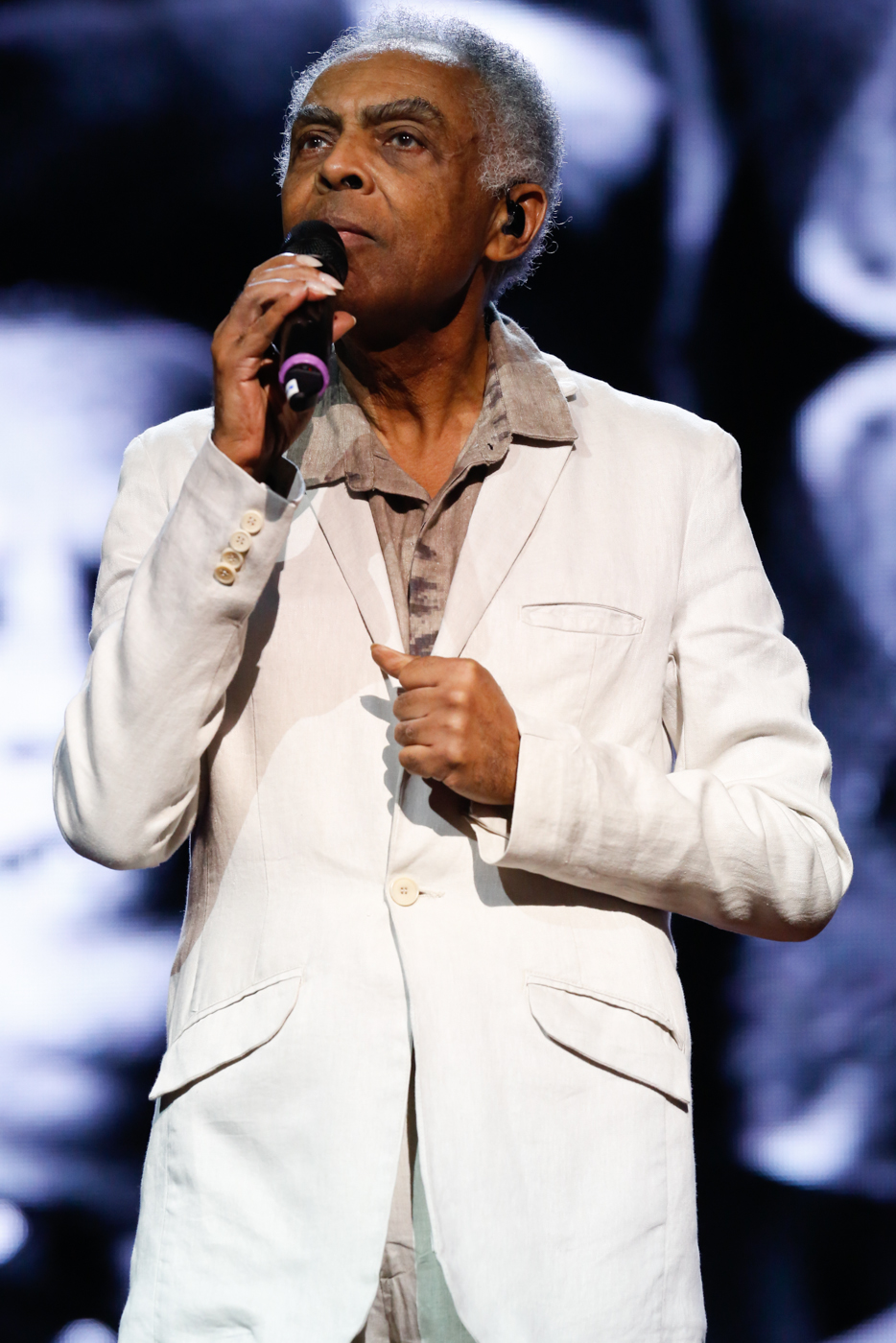
1999 award winner Gilberto Gil.

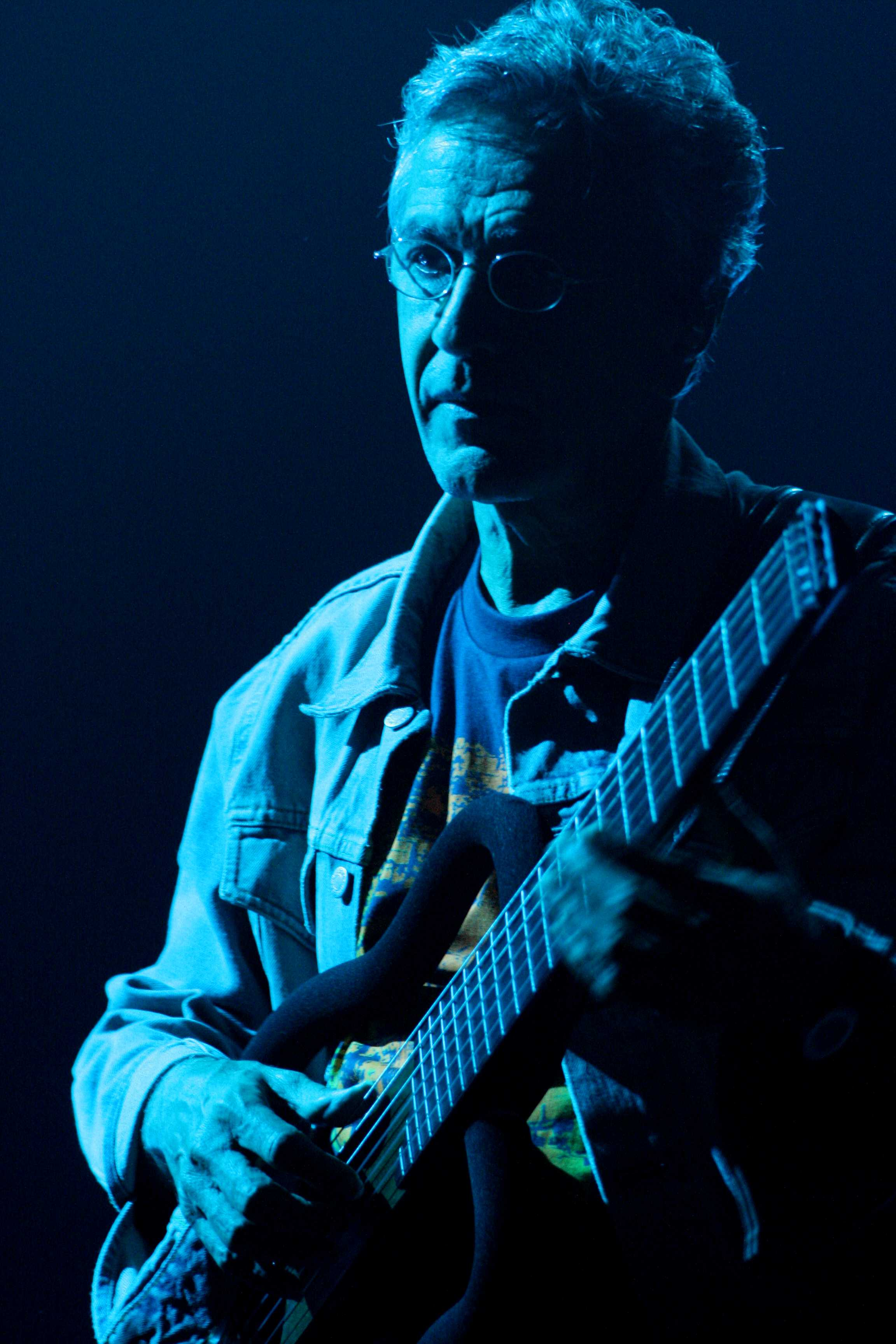
2000 award winner Caetano Veloso performing in 2006

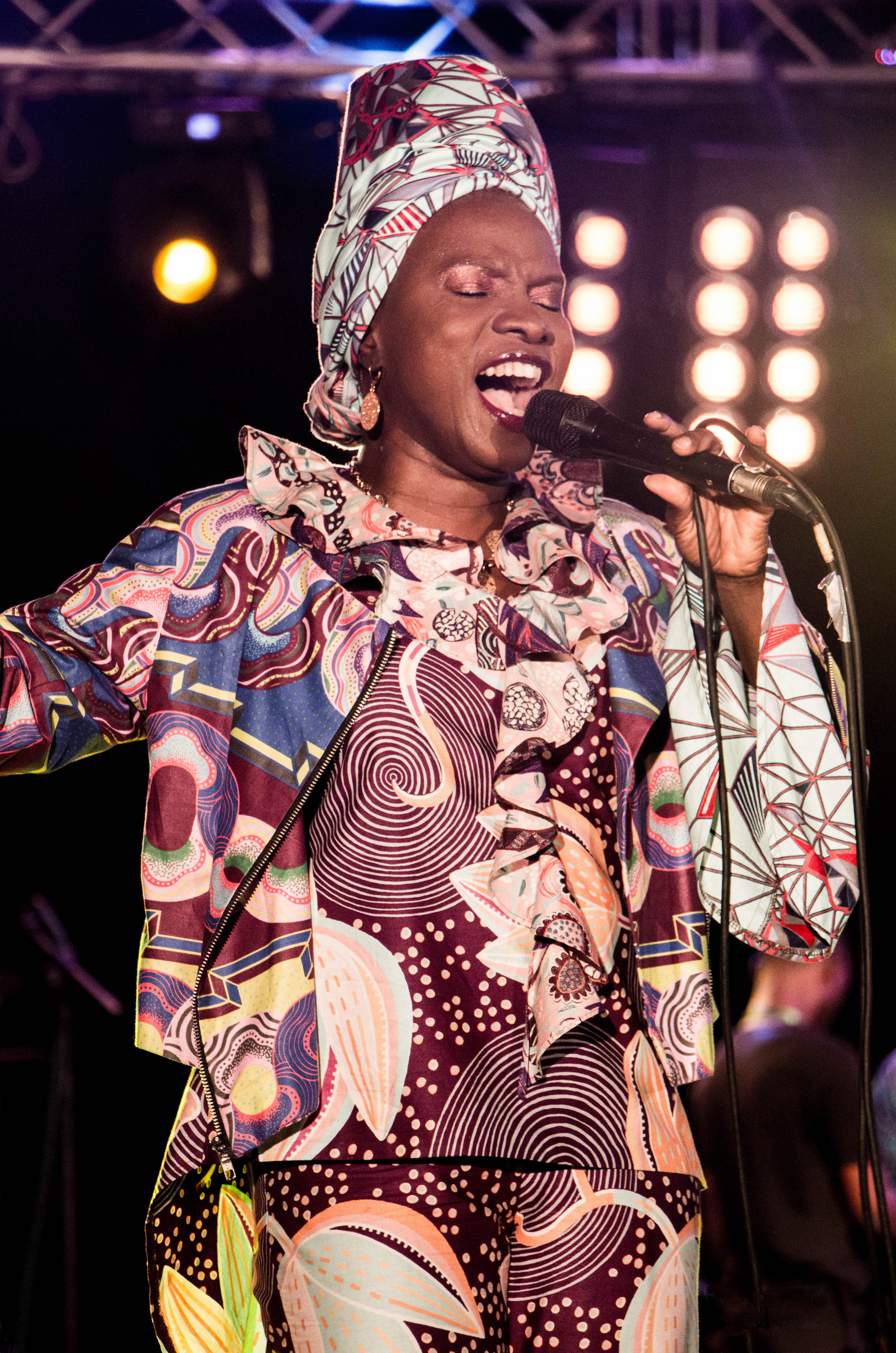
Four-time recipient Angélique Kidjo.

=== 1990s ===
Year^{[I]}	Work	Performing artist(s)
1992
1992	Planet Drum	Mickey Hart
1992	Amen	Salif Keita
1992	Brazilian Serenata	Dori Caymmi
1992	Este Mundo	Gipsy Kings
1992	Txai	Milton Nascimento
1993
1993	Brasileiro	Sérgio Mendes
1993	Américas	Strunz & Farah
1993	Eyes Open	Youssou N'Dour
1993	Gipsy Kings Live	Gipsy Kings
1993	Kirya	Ofra Haza
1994
1994	A Meeting by the River	Ry Cooder and Vishwa Mohan Bhatt
1994	Deep Forest	Deep Forest
1994	From Bulgaria with Love	Le Mystère des Voix Bulgares
1994	Heat, Dust and Dreams	Johnny Clegg and Savuka
1994	A World Out of Time, Vol. 2	Henry Kaiser and David Lindley
1995
1995	Talking Timbuktu	Ry Cooder and Ali Farka Touré
1995	Angelus	Milton Nascimento
1995	The Guide (Wommat)	Youssou N'Dour
1995	Love and Liberté	Gipsy Kings
1995	Sabsylma	Zap Mama
1996
1996	Boheme	Deep Forest
1996	Cesária	Cesária Évora
1996	Firin' in Fouta	Baaba Maal
1996	Raga Aberi	Shankar with Zakir Hussain and Vikku Vinayakram
1996	The Splendid Master Gnawa Musicians of Morocco	The Splendid Master Gnawa Musicians of Morocco featuring Randy Weston
1997
1997	Santiago	The Chieftains
1997	Legacy	Ali Akbar Khan and Asha Bhosle
1997	My People	Joe Zawinul
1997	Night Song	Nusrat Fateh Ali Khan and Michael Brook
1997	Tabula Rasā	Béla Fleck, V. M. Bhatt and Jiebing Chen
1997	Tierra Gitana	Gipsy Kings
1998
1998	Nascimento	Milton Nascimento
1998	Cabo Verde	Cesária Évora
1998	Compas	Gipsy Kings
1998	Love Drum Talk	Babatunde Olatunji
1998	Passing on the Tradition	Ali Akbar Khan
1999
1999	Quanta Live	Gilberto Gil
1999	Contact from the Underworld of Redboy	Robbie Robertson
1999	Miss Perfumado	Cesária Évora
1999	Odu	King Sunny Adé
1999	Oremi	Angélique Kidjo

=== 2000s ===
Year^{[I]}	Work	Performing artist(s)
2000
2000	Livro	Caetano Veloso
2000	Café Atlantico	Cesária Évora
2000	Niafunke	Ali Farka Touré
2000	Papa	Salif Keita
2000	Volume 2: Release	Afro Celt Sound System
2001
2001	João Voz e Violão	João Gilberto
2001	Homeland	Miriam Makeba
2001	Joko (The Link)	Youssou N'Dour
2001	Journey with the Sun	Paul Winter
2001	Water from the Well	The Chieftains
2002
2002	Full Circle: Carnegie Hall 2000	Ravi Shankar
2002	Gil and Milton	Gilberto Gil and Milton Nascimento
2002	São Vicente di Longe	Cesária Évora
2002	Saturday Night in Bombay: Remember Shakti	John McLaughlin and various artists
2002	Volume 3: Further in Time	Afro Celt Sound System
2003
2003	Mundo	Rubén Blades
2003	Black Ivory Soul	Angélique Kidjo
2003	Fight to Win	Femi Kuti
2003	Live at Carnegie Hall	Anoushka Shankar
2003	Moffou	Salif Keita

=== 2010s ===
Year^{[I]}	Work	Performing artist(s)
2012
2012	Tassili	Tinariwen
2012	Africa for Africa	Femi Kuti
2012	AfroCubism	AfroCubism
2012	Songs from a Zulu Farm	Ladysmith Black Mambazo
2013
2013	The Living Room Sessions Part 1	Ravi Shankar
2013	On a Gentle Island Breeze	Daniel Ho
2013	Folila	Amadou & Mariam
2013	Jabulani	Hugh Masekela
2013	Traveller	Anoushka Shankar
2014
2014	Savor Flamenco	Gipsy Kings
2014	Live: Singing for Peace Around the World	Ladysmith Black Mambazo
2014	The Living Room Sessions Part 2	Ravi Shankar
2014	No Place for My Dream	Femi Kuti
2015
2015	Eve	Angelique Kidjo
2015	Magic	Sérgio Mendes
2015	Our World in Song	Wu Man, Luis Conte and Daniel Ho
2015	Toumani & Sidiki	Toumani Diabaté and Sidiki Diabaté
2015	Traces of You	Anoushka Shankar
2016
2016	Sings	Angelique Kidjo
2016	Gilbertos Samba Ao Vivo	Gilberto Gil
2016	Home	Anoushka Shankar
2016	I Have No Everything Here	Zomba Prison Project
2016	Music from Inala	Ladysmith Black Mambazo with Ella Spira and the Inala Ensemble
2017
2017	Sing Me Home	Yo-Yo Ma and The Silk Road Ensemble
2017	Destiny	Celtic Woman
2017	Dois Amigos, Um Século de Música: Multishow Live	Caetano Veloso and Gilberto Gil
2017	Land of Gold	Anoushka Shankar
2017	Walking in the Footsteps of Our Fathers	Ladysmith Black Mambazo
2018
2018	Shaka Zulu Revisited: 30th Anniversary Celebration	Ladysmith Black Mambazo
2018	Elwan	Tinariwen
2018	Memoria de los Sentidos	Vicente Amigo
2018	Para Mi	Buika
2018	Rosa Dos Ventos	Anat Cohen and Trio Brasileiro
2019
2019	Freedom	Soweto Gospel Choir
2019	Black Times	Seun Kuti and Egypt 80
2019	Deran	Bombino
2019	Fenfo	Fatoumata Diawara
2019	Yiddish Glory – The Lost Songs of World War II	Various Artists

=== 2020s ===
Year^{[I]}	Work	Performing artist(s)
2020
2020	Celia	Angélique Kidjo
2020	African Giant	Burna Boy
2020	Fanm d'Ayiti	Nathalie Joachim and the Spektral Quartet
2020	Gece	Altin Gün
2020	What Heat	Bokanté and Metropole Orkest conducted by Jules Buckley
2021
2021	Twice as Tall	Burna Boy
2021	Agora	Bebel Gilberto
2021	Amadjar	Tinariwen
2021	Fu Chronicles	Antibalas
2021	Love Letters	Anoushka Shankar
2022
2022	Mother Nature	Angélique Kidjo
2022	East West Players Presents: Daniel Ho & Friends Live in Concert	Daniel Ho and Friends
2022	Legacy+	Femi Kuti and Made Kuti
2022	Made in Lagos: Deluxe Edition	Wizkid
2022	Voice of Bunbon (Vol. 1)	Rocky Dawuni
2023
2023	Sakura	Masa Takumi
2023	Between Us... (Live)	Anoushka Shankar, Metropole Orkest and Jules Buckley featuring Manu Delago
2023	Love, Damini	Burna Boy
2023	Queen of Sheba	Angélique Kidjo and Ibrahim Maalouf
2023	Shuruaat	Berklee Indian Ensemble
2024
2024	This Moment	Shakti
2024	Epifanías	Susana Baca
2024	History	Bokanté
2024	I Told Them...	Burna Boy
2024	Timeless	Davido
2025
2025	Alkebulan II	Matt B featuring Royal Philharmonic Orchestra
2025	Born in the Wild	Tems
2025	Heis	Rema
2025	Historias de un Flamenco	Antonio Rey
2025	Paisajes	Ciro Hurtado
2026
2026	Caetano e Bethânia Ao Vivo	Caetano Veloso and Maria Bethânia
2026	Chapter III: We Return to Light	Anoushka Shankar featuring Alam Khan and Sarathy Korwar
2026	Eclairer le monde — Light the World	Youssou N'Dour
2026	Mind Explosion (50th Anniversary Tour Live)	Shakti
2026	No Sign of Weakness	Burna Boy
2026	Sounds of Kumbha	Siddhant Bhatia
2027
2027	Equilibrium	Anitta
2027	Hope	Angélique Kidjo
2027	Love Is a Kingdom	Tems
2027	Oriadé	Davido
2027	Starrgirl	Ayra Starr

== See also ==
- Awards for world music
- List of cultural and regional genres of music
- List of Grammy Award categories
