= Leopolis Jazz Fest =

International jazz festival in Lviv, Ukraine

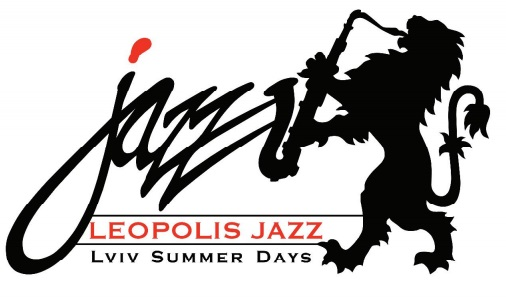
- Genre: Jazz
- Dates: last weekend of June
- Locations: Lviv, Ukraine
- Years active: 2011–present
- Website: Official website

Leopolis Jazz Fest (previously Alfa Jazz Fest) is an international jazz festival, annually held in June in Lviv (Ukraine) since 2011. The Guardian included Leopolis Jazz Fest in the list of the best European festivals.

== Overview ==
The festival was initiated by Mikhail Fridman, one of a shareholders of Alfa-Bank Ukraine and a native of Lviv, in 2011. The founder and the title sponsor of the festival till 2017 was Alfa-Bank (Ukraine) (from 2022 Sense Bank), and therefore the festival was called Alfa Jazz Fest. In 2017, the festival was renamed to Leopolis Jazz Fest to indicate its venue (Leopolis is the city's name in Latin).

In 2017, after the festival was renamed, the management of the festival was transferred to the organizing committee. At the moment, all trademarks and copyrights belong to the organizing committee. The festival is managed by a team of managers.Festival team

Organizer of the festival: NGO "LEOPOLIS JAZZ". On September 18, 2024, the creation of the legal entity of the non-governmental organization "LEOPOLIS JAZZ" was registered. The main direction of the Organization's activity is the development and popularization of jazz music in Ukraine. The founders of the Organization are the festival team representatives.

In addition to concerts of jazz musicians from around the world, the festival also hosts jam sessions, master-classes and autograph sessions with global jazz stars.

An annual awards ceremony, "Leopolis Jazz Music Awards" dedicated to Eddie Rosner (previously "Alfa Jazz Music Awards") is held during gala concert of the festival in Lviv. These awards are established to honour the artists who have made significant contribution to the development of jazz music. The winner is selected by a wide range of experts, including music critics, prominent culture persons, public and government officials, journalists and entrepreneurs from different countries.

== Venue ==
The festival takes place on three stages:

• The main festival stage in the Bohdan Khmelnytskyi Culture Park: the stage bears the name of famous Soviet jazz musician Eddie Rosner (ticket required)

• A stage on the central square of the city: Rynok Square (free entry)

• A stage in a historic part of the city: Pototski Palace square (free entry)

== History ==
Leopolis Jazz Fest 2022 / 2023

The festival was canceled due to Russia's war against Ukraine. The festival team involves musicians for the international support of Ukraine:

- For International Jazz Day 2023 a charity online broadcast of the concert of Lars Danielsson Group Liberetto III & INSO-Lviv from Leopolis Jazz Fest 2018 was organized;

- On the traditional festival days (the last weekend of June) in 2023 – Leopolis Jazz Weekend charity online broadcasts, when everyone can donate via UNITED24 – the official fundraising platform of Ukraine.

Leopolis Jazz Fest 2021

The 10th Leopolis Jazz Fest took place on June 24–28, 2021. During five days, about 200 musicians from 18 countries of the world performed on the stages of the Leopolis Jazz Fest.

Headliners of Leopolis Jazz Fest 2021: Seal, Chris Botti, Avishai Cohen Trio "Arvoles", Kamasi Washington, Jazz at Lincoln Center Orchestra with Wynton Marsalis, Jan Lundgren, Harold López-Nussa, Itamar Borochov, Kathrine Windfeld, Pianoboy.

For guests and residents of Lviv, two stages worked in the city center with free access - on Rynok Square and in the courtyard of the Potocki Palace. The concerts were held with the participation of leading European groups and bands from Austria, Italy, Spain, Lithuania, Luxembourg, Germany, Poland, Turkey, France, Sweden and Switzerland. Most of the performances on these stages traditionally took place with the support of embassies and cultural institutions.

The festival was held in compliance with all quarantine measures: the number of guests in the parterre and picnic areas was significantly reduced; to control the number of people, the entrance to the picnic areas was carried out with tickets with a symbolic price; all festival guests who bought tickets, as well as musicians, the organizing committee and contractors underwent mandatory testing for coronavirus.

This year, there were three picnic zones for the guests of the festival, where concerts of the main stage dedicated to Eddie Rosner were broadcast on the large screens. The largest picnic area was traditionally located on the territory of the Yunist stadium in the Bohdan Khmelnytsky park. It was also possible to comfortably accommodate in the Kyivstar picnic c area at the lower entrance to the park. At the top entrance to the park was the Staropramen picnic area.

Wynton Marsalis became the winner of the International music award "Leopolis Jazz Music Awards 2021".

During the festival, master classes for musicians and listeners were traditionally held in Lviv at the Mykola Lysenko Lviv National Music Academy.

Leopolis Jazz Fest 2020

Leopolis Jazz Fest 2020 has been postponed until 2021. The X anniversary of the Festival was scheduled for 25–29 June 2020 in Lviv. The decision to postpone the festival was made due to the large-scale spread of COVID-19. The new dates for Leopolis Jazz Fest are 24–28 June 2021 (Thursday-Monday).

Leopolis Jazz Fest 2019

On 26–30 June 2019, Lviv hosted the 9th International Jazz Festival Leopolis Jazz Fest. About 300 musicians from 15 countries gave their performances on the stages of Leopolis Jazz Fest during 5 days.

Leopolis Jazz Fest 2019 headliners included Adrien Brandeis, an award-winning young French jazz pianist and composer; Snarky Puppy, modern fusion and funk musicians, winners of three Grammy Awards; Etienne Mbappe & the Prophets, a renowned Cameroon bassist and composer; American composer and arranger Kenny Barron with his quintet; a pianist and multi-instrumentalist, singer, composer Jon Cleary and his band, The Absolute Monster Gentlemen; a world-renowned pianist and composer, holder of 22 Grammy Awards, Chick Corea with his project, My Spanish Heart Band; American singer and pianist Peter Cincotti; as well as one of the most famous British singers, Lisa Stansfield.

The performance of Canadian singer and pianist Diana Krall, who came to Ukraine for the first time, became a sensation for the festival guests. On the stage, she was accompanied by star musicians, including Joe Lovano, a saxophonist, guitarist Marc Ribot, who plays music ranging from free jazz to rock music, Robert Hurst, one of the leading jazz contrabassists, a holder of 7 Grammy awards, and drummer Karriem Riggins.

The performance of vocal improviser, with a voice turned into a musical instrument, Bobby McFerrin with his program Gimme5 (circlesongs) was unusual and exciting. A concert hall in Bohdan Khmelnytskyi Park turned into an impromptu choir, which included about 80 persons.

Winner of «Leopolis Jazz Music Awards» dedicated to Eddie Rosner became Kenny Barron.

The visitors and residents of the city had a chance to visit two stages in the city center with free access, on the Rynok Square and in the courtyard of Potocki Palace. The concerts included the leading European bands and bands from Austria, Denmark, Israel, Italy, Lithuania, Luxembourg, Germany, Turkey, Hungary, France, and Switzerland. Most performances at these stages were traditionally supported by embassies and institutions.

The festival guests could enjoy two complimentary picnic areas, where large LED screens broadcast the concerts from Eddie Rosner’s main stage (picnic area on the main alley of the park with the support of Kyivstar and Jazz Picnic at Yunist stadium in Bohdan Khmelnytskyi Park). The guests traditionally watched a very intense program: a souvenirs fair, entertainments for children with an interactive zone, workshops and a carousel, food courts, as well as concerts of street music festival winners.

On June 28, on the Constitution Day of Ukraine, TNMK, Skhid-Side and Dennis Adu’s Big Band with an exclusive Jazzy DeLuxe show performed at the Rynok Square Stage.

Traditionally, Leopolis Jazz Fest became a venue for master classes for musicians and listeners in Lviv National Music Academy named after Mykola Lysenko.

Vsi.Svoyi, the largest platform of Ukrainian brands, presented a separate "gift area" in Jazz Picnic zone for the first time as a part of Leopolis Jazz Fest.

Leopolis Jazz Fest 2018

From 27 June to 1 July 2018, the 8th International Leopolis Jazz Fest took place in Lviv. More than 170 musicians from 16 countries around the world performed on three city stages in Lviv over 5 days.

Special guests of the Leopolis Jazz Fest 2018 included legendary avant-garde jazz saxophonist and flautist Charles Lloyd & The Marvels, featuring Bill Frisell, Reuben Rogers, Eric Harland and Greg Leisz; Jamie Cullum, an outstanding British vocalist, pianist and composer, and Ronnie Scotts Jazz Award winner; R+R=NOW (Reflect + Respond = Now), a project by three-time Grammy Award winner Robert Glasper; leading fusion and jazz guitar player, as well as Grammy Award winner Lee Ritenour and Dave Grusin, an American composer, arranger, producer, pianist and orchestra leader, as well as a ten-time Grammy Award winner, feat. Melvin Lee Davis and Wes Ritenour; Ahmad Jamal – a great American jazz pianist, composer and arranger; Jacob Collier – singer, composer, arranger and multi-instrumentalist; Mario Biondi – Italian soul vocalist; Stefano Bollani - Napoli Trip – a virtuoso Italian pianist, composer, singer and TV host who performed with Napoli Trip; Marcus Miller – an American jazz multi-instrumentalist, composer, producer, arranger and two-time Grammy winner.

Lars Danielsson Group Liberetto III & INSO-Lviv also performed at the Leopolis Jazz Fest. A special exclusive programme was introduced to visitors of the Leopolis Jazz Fest by Swedish contrabass and bass player, cellist, composer and arranger Lars Danielsson, alongside the Academic Symphony Orchestra INSO-Lviv.

The best jazz musicians from various countries performed on Leopolis Jazz Fest stages, among others, the US, Great Britain, Sweden, Ukraine, Italy, France, Austria, Switzerland, Israel, Germany, Turkey, Canada, Poland, Denmark, Lithuania, and Luxembourg.

Ahmad Jamal was the winner of the International Eddie Rosner Leopolis Jazz Music Award in 2018.

Over the past few years, organising concerts by popular Ukrainian musicians on Constitution Day in Ukraine has become a festival tradition. As part of Leopolis Jazz Fest 2018, the ONUKA band performed on 28 June on the Rynok Square stage.

On 1 July, to celebrate Canada Day, the Embassy of Canada in Ukraine prepared a varied programme for festival visitors: a visit to Canada House/Maison du Canada featuring a traditional pancake breakfast, an exhibition by Canada House, a street ice rink for hockey, as well as performances by Canadian musicians.

In 2018, the Leopolis Jazz Fest started a partnership with USAID. A project to increase the accessibility and environmental friendliness of the Leopolis Jazz Fest has been implemented with the support of the Join up! Programme to Promote Public Activism. During the festival, training sessions on accessibility for the disabled, and environmental consciousness were held for staff and volunteers. The necessary infrastructure was provided for people with disabilities at the festival: separate platforms near the stages, ramps, special rubber and metal covers and accessible toilets. To promote environmental consciousness, special containers for sorting and recycling rubbish were used at the Leopolis Jazz Fest, and for children, a playground called Sorting Together.

Traditionally, the festival offered three freely accessible picnic areas where visitors could watch all the concerts on the main stage on large LED screens. Master classes, numerous jam sessions, and film screenings of rare videos and jazz films were presented for festival visitors, prepared by the leading figure of the Ukrainian jazz movement, Leonid Goldstein.

Alfa Jazz Fest 2017

From June 23 to June 27, the seventh International Jazz Festival Leopolis Jazz Fest was held in Lviv.

Among the headliners of Leopolis Jazz Fest 2017: Gordon Goodwin's Big Phat Band; Buika; Yellowjackets; China Moses; Gregory Porter; Chucho Valdes; trio Mare Nostrum: Paolo Fresu, Richard Galliano, Jan Lundgren; Herbie Hancock; Chick Corea Elektric Band.

Also within the festival a joint project of jazz legends and Ukrainian musicians was presented - the Israeli jazz contrabassist, composer, singer and arranger Avishai Cohen performed his plays together with the Academic Symphony Orchestra "INSO-Lviv".

Traditionally, in 2017 a wide geography of participants was presented: bands from Austria, Great Britain, Israel, Spain, Italy, Cuba, Germany, Luxembourg, USA, Poland, Turkey, Ukraine, France, the Czech Republic, Switzerland, and Sweden participated in the festival. In total for 5 days the festival was attended by more than 200 musicians from 15 countries worldwide.

The owner of the International Music Award "Leopolis Jazz Fest Awards" dedicated to Eddie Rosner in 2017 became Chucho Valdes. The award ceremony traditionally took place during the festival days.

Also master classes, photo exhibitions, jazz film shows and jams sessions were held within the Leopolis Jazz Fest 2017.

Alfa Jazz Fest 2016

The 6th International jazz festival Alfa Jazz Fest was held on June 24–28, 2016 in Lviv. Traditionally the best jazz performers of the United States, Europe and Ukraine performed at the three stages in the center of Lviv.

Headliners of Alfa Jazz Fest 2016: Pat Metheny with Antonio Sanchez, Linda Oh & Gwilym Simcock, Branford Marsalis Quartet with special guest Kurt Elling, Arturo Sandoval 10 time Grammy Award winner, Dianne Reeves with Peter Martin, Romero Lubambo, Reginald Veal, Terreon Gully, Esperanza Spalding presents: Emily's D+Evolution.

The ceremony of the International Music Award «Alfa Jazz Fest Awards» dedicated to Eddie Rosner was traditionally held within the festival. The winner of «Alfa Jazz Fest Awards» dedicated to Eddie Rosner in 2016 became Pat Metheny.

Alfa Jazz Fest 2015

The fifth anniversary jazz festival «Alfa Jazz Fest» was held on June 25–29, 2015. More than 100 musicians from 10 countries (Germany, Austria, the USA, Japan, Sweden, Cuba, France, Poland and Ukraine) performed in Lviv during five festival days. Among the most famous - American jazz legends: Herbie Hancock, George Benson, Wayne Shorter, Mike Stern, Cuban clarinetist Paquito D'Rivera and Hiromi, famous jazz pianist from Japan.

The winner of the International Music Award «Alfa Jazz Fest Awards» dedicated to Eddie Rosner in 2015 became Herbie Hancock, American jazz pianist and composer, 14-time Grammy Award winner, one of the most influential jazz musicians of the 20th century. The awarding ceremony was traditionally held during the festival in Lviv.

Alfa Jazz Fest 2014

The 4th International jazz festival Alfa Jazz Fest was held on June 12–15, 2014 in Lviv.

Headliners Alfa Jazz Fest 2014: Larry Carlton, Dee Dee Bridgewater, Eliane Elias, Miles Electric Band, Lucky Peterson, Charles Lloyd.

In 2014 the winner of the International Music Award «Alfa Jazz Fest Awards» dedicated to Eddie Rosner became Charles Lloyd.

Award ceremony was held on June 14, 2014.

The last days' concerts of the festival was canceled due to the announced all-Ukrainian mourning for the perished Ukrainian militaries in the east of the country.

Alfa Jazz Fest 2013

On June 13–16, 2013 the third International jazz festival Alfa Jazz Fest was held in Lviv.

Headliners of Alfa Jazz Fest 2013: Dirty Dozen Brass Band (USA); Avishai Cohen (Israel); Till Brönner (Germany); Al Di Meola (USA); Charlie Haden Quartet West (USA); Bobby McFerrin (USA).

On June 15, 2013 the awarding ceremony «Alfa Jazz Fest Awards» dedicated to Eddie Rosner took place on the gala-concert. In 2013 Award was presented to Charlie Haden — one of the most famous American jazz musicians and composers, four time Grammy Award winner.

Alfa Jazz Fest 2012

The second International jazz festival Alfa Jazz Fest was held in Lviv on June 1–3, 2012. The festival was attended by over 30,000 spectators from different countries.

Headliners of Alfa Jazz Fest 2012: Kenny Garrett (USA), Richard Bona Band (Cameroon), Cassandra Wilson (USA), John Patitucci Trio (USA), Gino Vannelli Band (Canada), John McLaughlin the 4th dimension (UK).

In 2012, for the first time, there was an award ceremony, the “Alfa Jazz Fest Awards” dedicated to Eddie Rosner. In 2012 the prize was awarded to John McLaughlin, the legendary British guitarist, playing jazz-fusion.

Alfa Jazz Fest 2011

The first International jazz festival Alfa Jazz Fest was held in Lviv on June 3–5, 2011.

Headliners of Alfa Jazz Fest 2011: Spyro Gyra (USA), John Scofield (USA), Ron Carter (USA), Bill Evans Soulgrass (USA), Jeff Lorber Fusion Superband (USA).
