= Ser Minas Tão Gerais =

Musical

Ser Minas Tão Gerais is a piece of musical theater first produced by the group Ponto de Partida in 2002, written and directed by Regina Bertola. The play is based on the poetry of Carlos Drummond de Andrade and Milton Nascimento, and is rich with cultural references of Minas Gerais.

The music, directed by Gilvan de Oliveira, included Milton Nascimento and the Meninos do Araçuaí boys chorus.
