= Caetano e Bethânia Ao Vivo =

Live album by Caetano Veloso and Maria Bethânia
- Released: May 26, 2025
- Genre: Música popular brasileira
- Length: 1:45:00
- Label: Sony Music Brazil

Caetano Veloso and Maria Bethânia chronology
Maria Bethânia e Caetano Veloso - Ao Vivo (1978)	Caetano e Bethânia Ao Vivo (2025)

CAE<->BTH: Caetano e Bethânia Ao Vivo is a live album by Brazilian musicians and siblings Caetano Veloso and Maria Bethânia, released on May 26, 2025, by Sony Music Brazil.

== Background ==
In 1978, musicians and siblings Caetano Veloso and Maria Bethânia released the album Maria Bethânia e Caetano Veloso - Ao Vivo, a live concert recording released by Universal. In 2024, Bethânia had the idea of doing a new version of the show, with new songs in the repertoire celebrating the long careers of Bahian musicians.

The album was a live recording of the tour, which visited several Brazilian cities, including Rio de Janeiro, São Paulo, Porto Alegre, Salvador, Recife, Fortaleza, and Curitiba among other capitals. The album was released by Sony Music Brazil on May 26, 2025, featured the previously unreleased song "Uma Baiana". The show featured a series of songs composed by Veloso, as well as works by other composers, including Gilberto Gil, Raul Seixas, Paulo Coelho, Roberto Carlos, Erasmo Carlos, and Guilherme Arantes.

The album features two tributes to Gal Costa, with performances of the songs "Baby" and "Vaca Profana", two compositions by Veloso for the Bahian artist.

== Track listing ==
Caetano e Bethânia Ao Vivo
No.	Title	Writer(s)	Length
1.	"Alegria, Alegria"	Caetano Veloso	3:15
2.	"Os Mais Doces dos Bárbaros"	Caetano Veloso	4:22
3.	"Gente"	Caetano Veloso	3:47
4.	"Oração Ao Tempo"	Caetano Veloso	4:08
5.	"Motriz / Não Identificado" (medley)		5:40
6.	"A Tua Presença Morena"	Caetano Veloso	2:03
7.	"Milagres do Povo"	Caetano Veloso	2:23
8.	"Pot-Pourri: 13 de maio, Samba de Dois, Cosme e Damião, Lindomar e A Donzela se Casou" (medley)		5:37
9.	"Filhos de Gandhi"	Gilberto Gil / Caetano Veloso	3:38
10.	"Ia Omim Bum / Dedicatória" (medley)		2:33
11.	"Eu e Água"	Caetano Veloso	2:58
12.	"Tropicália"	Caetano Veloso	3:35
13.	"Marginália II"	Caetano Veloso	2:47
14.	"Um Índio"	Caetano Veloso	3:20
15.	"Cajuína"	Caetano Veloso	2:24
16.	"Sozinho"	Peninha	3:09
17.	"O Leãozinho"	Caetano Veloso
18.	"Você Não Me Ensinou a Te Esquecer"	Catullo da Paixão Cearense / Fernando Lobo	2:51
19.	"Você é Linda"	Caetano Veloso	4:24
20.	"Deus Cuida de Mim"	Kleber Lucas	4:24
21.	"Brincar de Viver"	Guilherme Arantes / Jon Lucien	4:37
22.	"Não Dá Mais Pra Segurar (Explode Coração)"	Gonzaguinha	1:57
23.	"As Canções Que Você Fez Pra Mim"	Roberto Carlos / Erasmo Carlos	3:34
24.	"Negue"	Adelino Moreira / Enzo de Almeida Passos	1:46
25.	"Homenagem à Mangueira"	Caetano Veloso	3:34
26.	"Baby"	Caetano Veloso	4:30
27.	"Vaca Profana"	Caetano Veloso	3:55
28.	"Gita"	Raul Seixas / Paulo Coelho	3:13
29.	"O Quereres"	Caetano Veloso	3:13
30.	"Fé"	Caetano Veloso	3:27
31.	"Reconvexo"	Caetano Veloso	3:55
32.	"Tudo de Novo"	Caetano Veloso	3:40
33.	"Um Baiana" (inédita)	Caetano Veloso	2:35
Total length:			1:45:00

== Reception ==
=== Critical ===
Journalist and music critic Mauro Ferreira praised the album on his blog on G1, giving it four stars out of five and adding, "inconsistencies aside, the release of a live album is important because, in audio without images, nuances that are sometimes imperceptible in the magic of the scene, when all eyes are on the singers, stand out". Thales de Menezes, writing for the Folha de S. Paulo newspaper, gave five stars out of five, adding: "the distribution of songs in the show goes beyond that. There are songs that make connections between the two artists' careers."

=== Awards and nominations ===
The album is nominated for the Best Global Music Album award at the upcoming 68th Annual Grammy Awards, due to be held on February 1, 2026. The album won the category. Caetano's producer and wife, Paula Lavigne, shared a video of Caetano saying that he “didn't know what time the Grammys were going to be” and that he was watching cartoons with his grandson during the awards ceremony. Caetano called his sister, Bethânia, to share the news.
