= Nascimento (album) =

Studio album by Milton Nascimento
- Released: 1997
- Studio: Mega Studios (Rio de Janeiro, Brazil); Unique Studios (New York City); Room With a View (New York City)
- Genre: MPB, Jazz
- Length: 49:04
- Label: Warner Bros.
- Producer: Russ Titelman

Milton Nascimento chronology
Amigo (1995)	Nascimento (1997)	Tambores de Minas (1998)

Nascimento is an album by Brazilian musician Milton Nascimento, released through Warner Bros. Records in 1997. In 1998, the album earned Milton Nascimento the Grammy Award for Best World Music Album.

== Track listing ==
1. "Louva-A-Deus (The Praying Mantis)" (Brant, Nascimento) – 3:07
2. "O Cavaleiro (The Rider)" (Lopes, Nascimento) – 3:42
3. "Guardanapos de Papel (Paper Napkins)" (Leo Maslíah) – 5:24
4. "Cuerpo y Alma (Body and Soul)" (Mateo) – 3:59
5. "Rouxinol (The Nightingale)" (Nascimento) – 3:15
6. "Janela Para O Mundo (Window to the World)" (Brant, Nascimento) – 4:04
7. "E Agora, Rapaz? (And What Now, Man?)" (Caninana) – 4:43
8. "Levantados Do Chão (Raised from the Ground)" (Chico Buarque, Nascimento) – 3:16
9. "Ana Maria" (Wayne Shorter) – 5:18
10. "Ol' Man River" (Hammerstein, Kern) – 3:33
11. "Os Tambores de Minas (Minas Drums)" (Borges, Nascimento) – 3:19
12. "Biromes y Servilletas (Paper Napkins)" (Leo Maslíah) – 5:24

== Personnel ==
- Hugo Fattoruso - piano and accordion on tracks "O Cavaleiro", "Rouxinol" e "Janela Para o Mundo" and keyboards on "Rouxinol"
- Túlio Mourão - keyboards
- Wilson Lopes - acoustic guitar and viola on "O Rouxinol"
- Luiz Alves - acoustic bass on all tracks, except on tracks "Louva-A-Deus, "Rouxinol"," "Janela Para o Mundo", "E agora, Rapaz?", "Levantados do Chão" and "Os Tambores de Minas"
- Lincoln Cheib - drums, percussion
- Robertinho Silva - percussion, drums
- Ronaldo Silva - percussion
- Alberto Continentino - electric bass on tracks "Rouxinol", "E agora, Rapaz?" and "Levantados do Chão"
- Nivaldo Ornelas - flutes on "Rouxinol" soprano saxophone na faixa "Cuerpo y Alma" and "Ana Maria", flute in G on track "Ol' Man River"
