= Milagre dos Peixes =

Studio album by Milton Nascimento
- Released: April 2, 1973
- Recorded: 1971–1972
- Genre: MPB
- Length: 40:56
- Label: EMI, Universal
- Producer: Fernando Brant

Milton Nascimento chronology
Clube da Esquina (1972)	Milagre dos Peixes (1973)	Native Dancer (1974)

Professional ratings
Review scores
Source	Rating
Allmusic	4.5/5 stars

Milagre dos Peixes (transl. Miracle of the Fishes) is an album by Brazilian singer and composer Milton Nascimento released in 1973 by EMI/Odeon (now Universal Music Group). The album (released on one 12-inch LP and one 7-inch EP) comprises 11 songs, 8 of which are instrumental.

== Recording ==
Three of the eight instrumental tracks initially featured lyrics, but were censored by the Brazilian military regime; Nascimento elected to remove the lyrics rather than alter them.

== Reception ==
In 2007, Rolling Stone Brasil ranked it 63rd in its list of the 100 greatest Brazilian records.

== Track listing ==
Side one
No.	Title	Writer(s)	Length
1.	"Os Escravos de Jó" ("Slaves of Job")	Nascimento, Fernando Brant	3:12
2.	"Carlos, Lúcia, Chico e Tiago"	Nascimento	6:03
3.	"Milagre dos Peixes" ("Miracle of the Fishes")	Nascimento, Brant	2:51
4.	"A Chamada" ("The Call")	Nascimento	4:18
Total length:			16:24

Side two
No.	Title	Writer(s)	Length
5.	"Pablo Nº 2"	Nascimento, Ronaldo Bastos	3:13
6.	"Tema dos Deuses" ("Theme of the Gods")	Nascimento	3:23
7.	"Hoje é Dia de El Rey" ("Today is El Rey's Day")	Nascimento, Márcio Borges	6:55
8.	"A Última Sessão de Música" ("The Last Music Session")	Nascimento	2:18
Total length:			15:49

Side three
No.	Title	Writer(s)	Length
9.	"Cadê" ("Where")	Nascimento, Ruy Guerra	3:58
Total length:			3:58

Side four
No.	Title	Writer(s)	Length
10.	"Sacramento"	Nascimento, Nelson Angelo	1:52
11.	"Pablo"	Nascimento, Bastos	2:53
Total length:			4:45
