= Milton Nascimento =

Brazilian singer-songwriter and musician

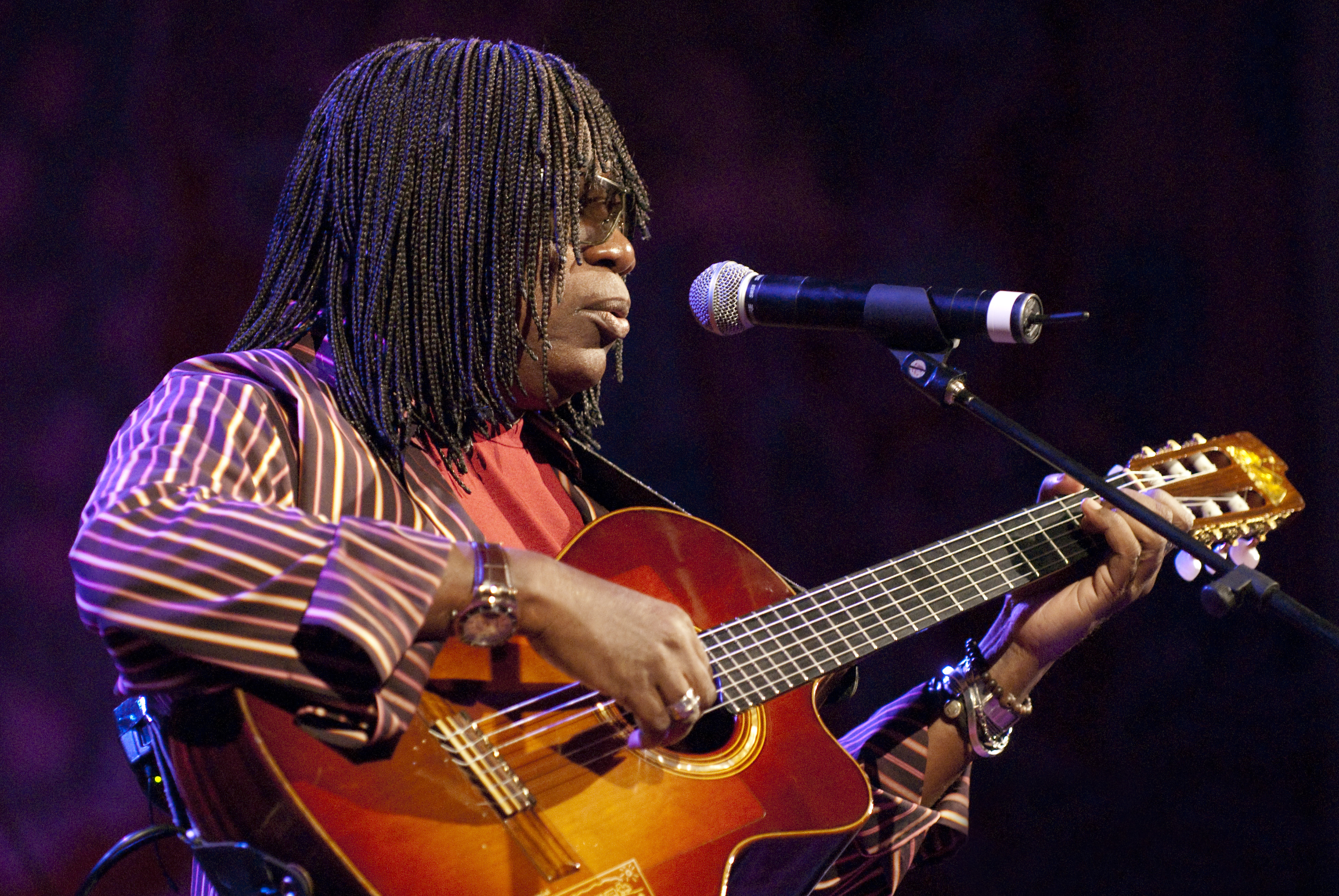
- Nascimento in 2008

Background information
- Also known as: Bituca
- Born: October 26, 1942 (age 83); Rio de Janeiro, Brazil
- Origin: Três Pontas, Minas Gerais, Brazil
- Genres: MPB; pop rock; rock and roll; jazz; soft rock; afrobeat; worldbeat; adult contemporary; pop
- Occupations: Singer; songwriter; guitarist
- Instruments: Vocals; guitar; piano
- Years active: 1962–2025
- Labels: Warner Music Brazil; Universal Music Brazil; Sony Music Brazil; Philips; Mercury; CTI; EMI Music Brazil; Warner Bros. Records; Blue Note/EMI Records; Nonesuch/Elektra Records

Milton Silva Campos do Nascimento (Brazilian Portuguese: [ˈmiwtõ ˈsiwvɐ ˈkɐ̃puz du nasiˈmẽtu]; born October 26, 1942), also known as Bituca, is a Brazilian singer-songwriter and multi-instrumentalist.

Nascimento has recorded 32 studio albums and has won five Grammy Awards, including Best World Music Album for his album Nascimento in 1998, and twelve Brazilian Music Awards. He has collaborated with various artists including Björk, Pat Metheny, Caetano Veloso, and Elis Regina.

== Biography ==
Milton Nascimento was born in the boarding house Dona Augusta in the neighborhood of Tijuca, Rio de Janeiro, where his mother, Maria do Carmo do Nascimento, was a maid. Maria raised her son on her own, until dying of tuberculosis when he was two, thereafter he was taken care of by his maternal grandmother. Nascimento was then adopted as a young child by the relatives of the grandmother's former employers; Josino Brito Campos, a bank employee, mathematics teacher and electronic technician and Lília Silva Campos, a music teacher and choir singer. He moved with his adoptive parents to the city of Três Pontas, in the state of Minas Gerais. When Nascimento was a child, he was nicknamed "Bituca" because he pouted when he was upset, which made him look like a native botocudo.

Nascimento took an interest in music as a child thanks to his mother, who studied under Villa Lobos. At four years old, he was given an accordion and began to sing. At 13 years old, he became a crooner in the group Continental de Duilio Tiso Cougo. Nascimento was also an occasional DJ on a radio station that his father once ran. He lived in the neighborhoods of Laranjeiras and Tijuca in Rio de Janeiro.

In 1968, Nascimento was married to a student named Lurdeca in Tijuca. The couple lived in Copabacana, though the marriage only lasted a month, later being annulled. After this, he chose to dedicate his time to music instead of marrying or having kids, however, he would later adopt a son, Augusto Kesrouani do Nascimento, in 2016 after ten years of knowing him.

=== Clube da Esquina ===
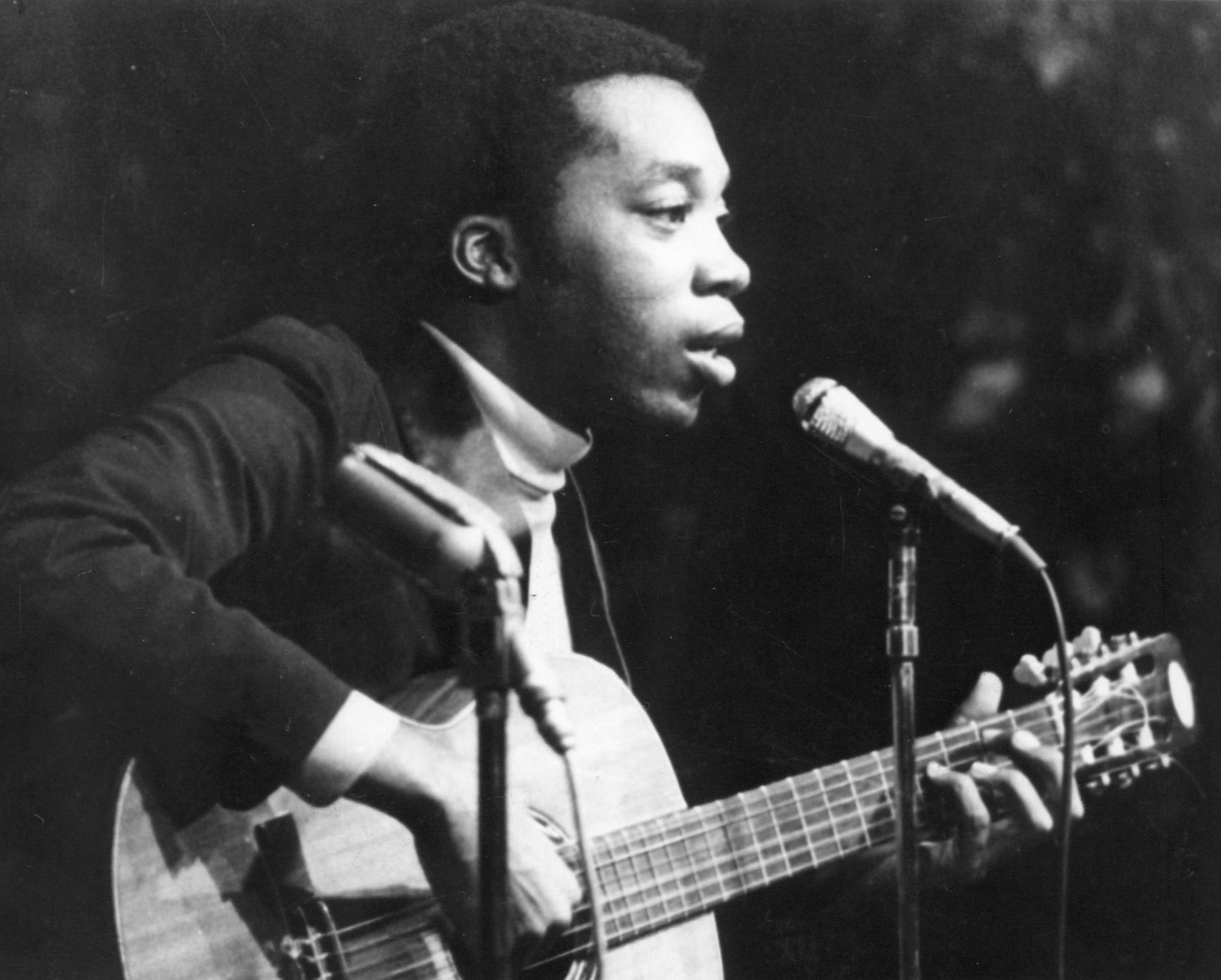
Nascimento in 1969.

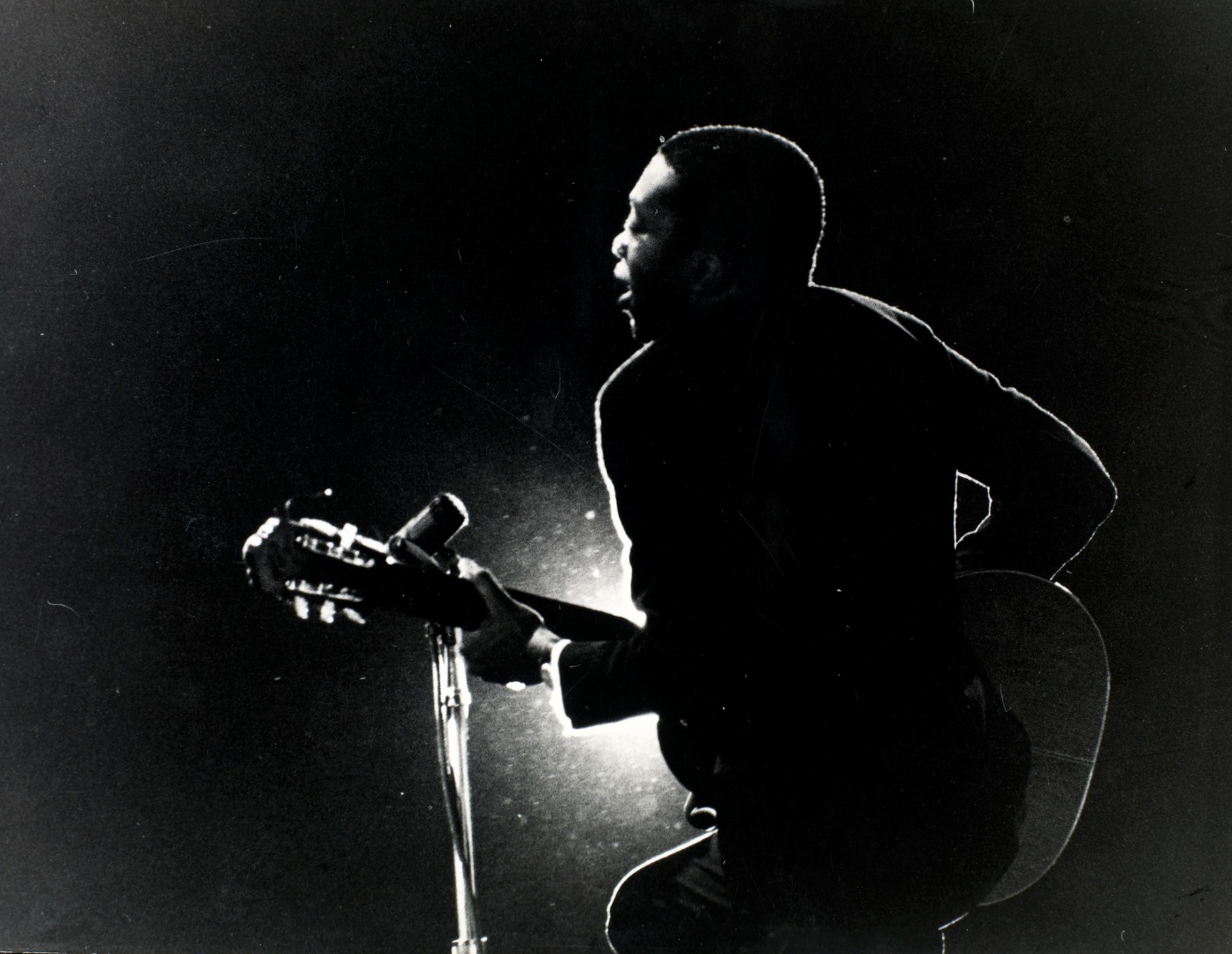
At the Festival Internacional da Canção, 1967.

In the early stages of his career, Nascimento played in two samba groups, Evolussamba and Sambacana. He would also play in the group W's Boys alongside Wagner Tiso in Três Pontas. In 1962, he recorded his first song "Barulho de Trem." A year later, in 1963, he moved to Belo Horizonte, where his friendship with Lô Borges led to the Clube da Esquina ("street corner club") movement. Members included Beto Guedes, Toninho Horta, Wagner Tiso, and Flávio Venturini, with whom he shared compositions and melodies. One composition was "Canção do Sal", which was first covered by singer Elis Regina in 1966, and led to a television appearance with Nascimento. The collective, as well as some others, released Clube da Esquina in 1972. Several hit singles were also released.

In 1967, he entered the Festival Internacional da Canção after Agostinho dos Santos had sent in three of his tracks to the search committee. He placed second with "Travessia" ("Bridges") and was able to score a three-album contract with Creed Taylor who had been in attendance. He moved to the United States to record with Taylor, beginning with the album Courage in 1969.

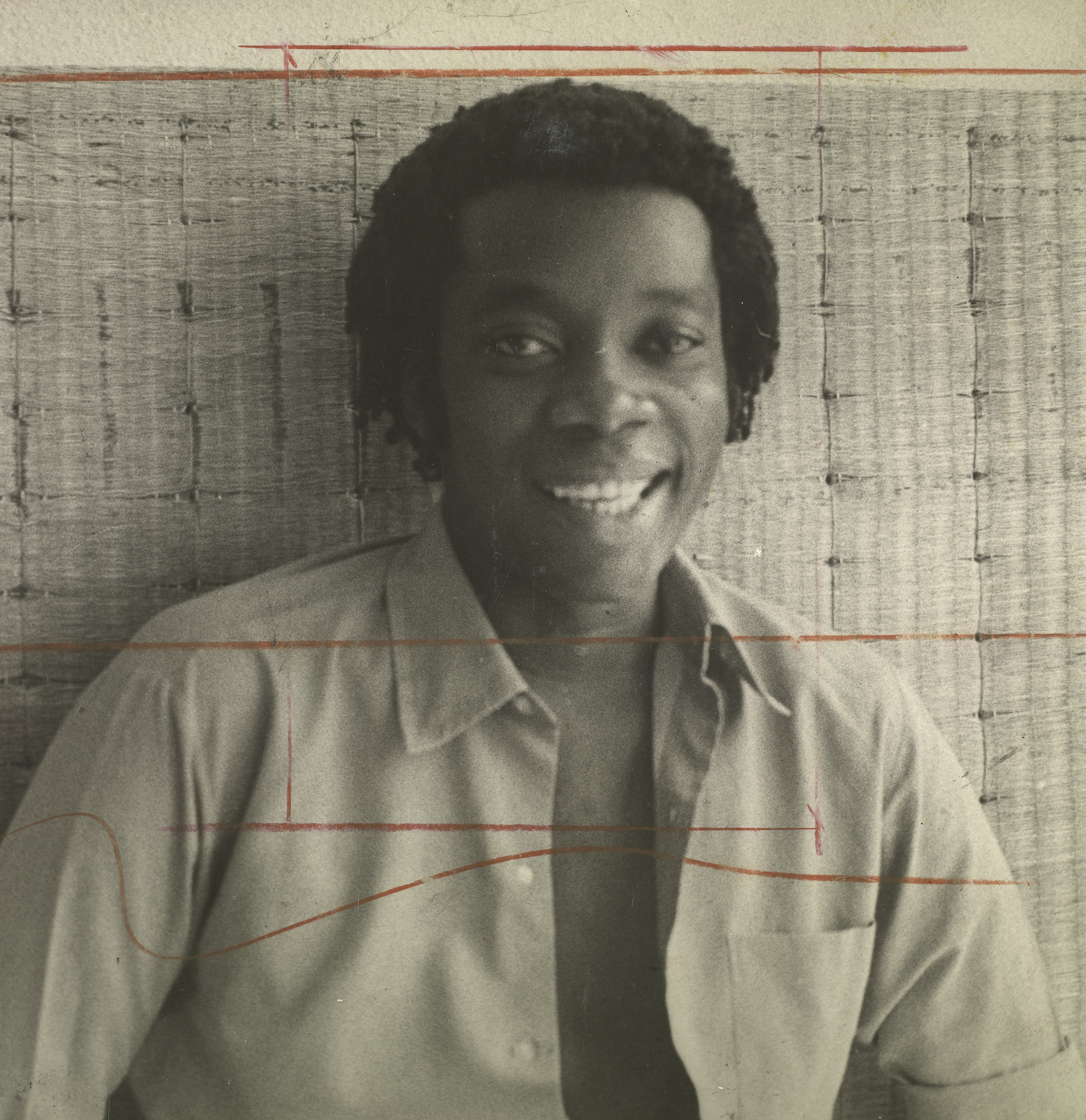
Milton Nascimento in 1972

Nascimento's compositions include songs such as "Nada Será Como Antes" ("Nothing Will Be As It Was"), "Maria, Maria", "Canção da América" ("Song from America"/"Unencounter"), "Bailes da Vida", and "Coração de Estudante" ("Student's Heart"), a song about the funeral of Edson Luís, who was killed by police officers in 1968. The song became the hymn for the Diretas Já social-political campaign in 1984, was played at the funeral of President-elect Tancredo Neves the next year, and was also played at Ayrton Senna's funeral.

=== Diversification ===
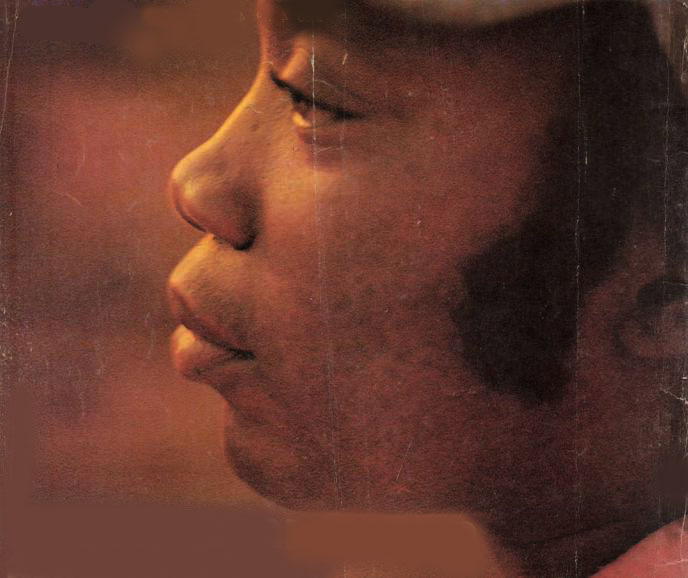
Nascimento in 1979.

While his reputation within Brazil was firmly established with his Clube da Esquina works, Nascimento's international breakthrough came with his appearance on jazz saxophonist Wayne Shorter's 1974 album Native Dancer. This led to widespread acclaim, and collaborations with Paul Simon, Sarah Vaughan, Mercedes Sosa, Carlos Santana, Pablo Milanés, Cat Stevens, George Duke, Quincy Jones and Earth, Wind And Fire. Angelus (1994) features appearances by Pat Metheny, Ron Carter, Herbie Hancock, Jack DeJohnette, Nana Vasconcelos, Jon Anderson, James Taylor, and Peter Gabriel, among many others. Through his friendship with guitarist Warren Cuccurullo, Nascimento came to work with the pop rock band Duran Duran in 1993. Nascimento co-wrote and performed the song "Breath After Breath", featured on the band's 1993 album Duran Duran. He also performed with the band in concert when they toured in Brazil in support of that album.

In 1996, Nascimento contributed the song "Dancing" to the AIDS benefit album Red Hot + Rio, produced by the Red Hot Organization.

=== Ser Minas Tão Gerais ===
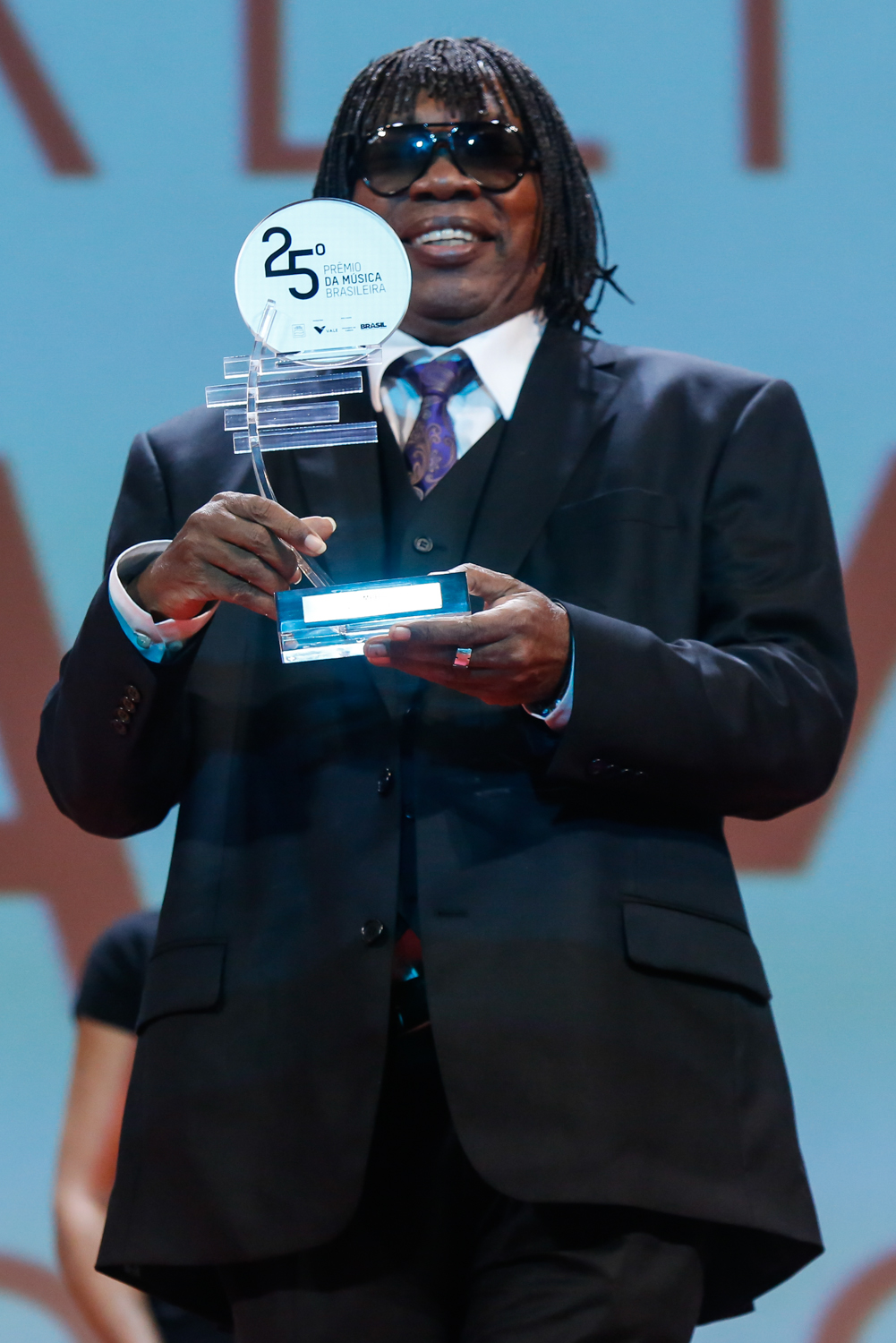
Nascimento in 2014

Nascimento starred in the 2002 musical theater piece Ser Minas Tão Gerais by the group Ponto de Partida. The piece paid homage to the poetry of Nascimento and Carlos Drummond de Andrade, two "iconic" poets from Minas Gerais.

In 2004, he worked with the Brazilian heavy metal band Angra, on the song "Late Redemption" from their album Temple of Shadows.

In 2016, Nascimento was awarded an honorary Doctor of Music degree from Berklee College of Music.

In 2018, Nascimento released the EPs A Festa and Nada Será Como Antes, consisting of acoustic reinterpretations of some of his past hits.

=== Collaborations and farewell tour ===
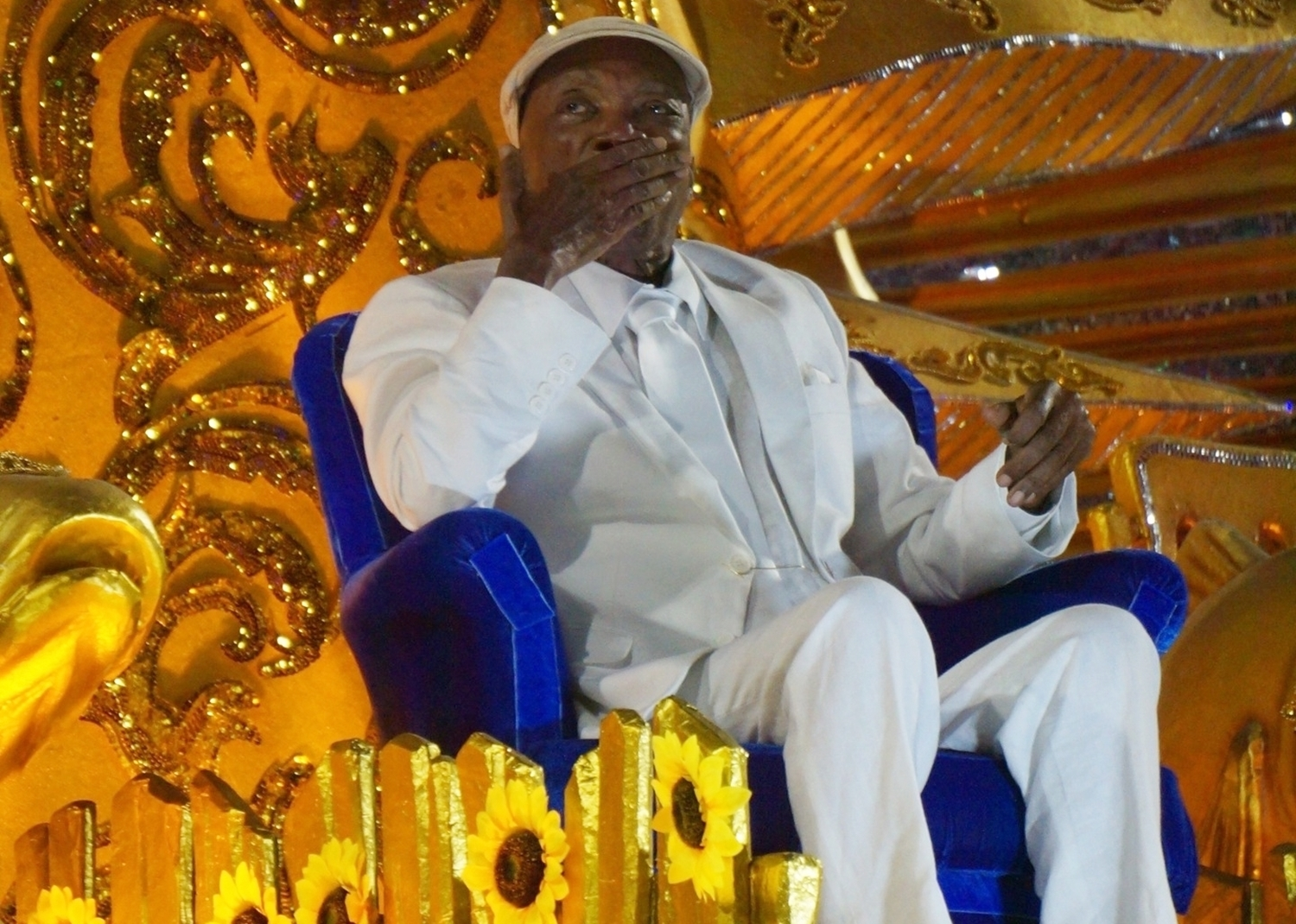
Nascimento being honored by Portela in the 2025 Brazilian Carnival.

In 2020, Nascimento released Existe Amor, a four-track collaborative EP with São Paulo rapper Criolo. The EP was part of the Existe Amor project, a campaign for a solidarity fund for Brazilians in socially vulnerable conditions during the coronavirus pandemic. The campaign's launch took place via projections on buildings in São Paulo to encourage donations to organizations such as É de Lei, SP Invisível and Arsenal da Esperança, among others.

On October 26, 2021, on his 79th birthday, Nascimento announced his 2022 farewell tour A Última Sessão de Música (The Last Music Session) on social media, although he would later state that he was not quitting music. The title of the tour is a reference to the track of the same name on his 1973 album Milagre dos Peixes. He played his last show on November 13, 2022, at the Mineirão stadium in Belo Horizonte.

On November 15, 2023, Nascimento released Outros Cantos, a collaborative album with sertanejo duo Chitãozinho & Xororó.

On May 15, 2024, Nascimento announced a new album with American musician and songwriter Esperanza Spalding titled Milton + Esperanza. Recorded in Brazil in 2023, it was released on August 9, 2024, via Concord Records and received critical acclaim from music critics. The album was nominated for Best Jazz Vocal Album at the 67th Annual Grammy Awards. On October 29, 2024, Nascimento released the collaborative EP Moon Over Minas with American musician and producer Jonathan Wilson. The EP was recorded while Wilson was on tour in Brazil. Although Milton stated that he would be retiring from live concerts and tours, a NPR Tiny Desk (Home) Concert was published on August 7, 2024, featuring him, Esperanza Spalding, Guinga, Maria Gadú, among other artists performing five songs from the album. As NPR Music states in the description of the performance on YouTube, "it’s likely to be the only video performance of this music".

== Health ==
In October 2025, Nascimento's family announced that he had been diagnosed with Lewy body dementia.

== Discography ==
=== Studio albums ===
- 1967: Milton Nascimento (Travessia)
- 1969: Courage
- 1969: Milton Nascimento
- 1970: Milton
- 1972: Clube da Esquina (with Lô Borges and Clube da Esquina)
- 1973: Milagre dos Peixes
- 1974: Native Dancer (with Wayne Shorter)
- 1975: Minas
- 1976: Geraes
- 1976: Milton (with Wayne Shorter and Herbie Hancock)
- 1978: Clube da Esquina 2
- 1979: Journey to Dawn
- 1980: Sentinela
- 1981: Caçador de Mim
- 1982: Anima
- 1982: Ponta de Areia
- 1982: Missa dos Quilombos (with Pedro Casaldáliga and Pedro Tierra)
- 1983: Ao Vivo
- 1985: Encontros e Despedidas
- 1986: A Barca dos Amantes (with Wayne Shorter)
- 1987: Yauaretê (with Wayne Shorter and Herbie Hancock)
- 1989: Miltons with Herbie Hancock
- 1990: Canção da America
- 1990: Txai
- 1992: Noticias do Brasil
- 1993: Três Pontas
- 1994: Angelus (with Wayne Shorter, Herbie Hancock, James Taylor and Jon Anderson)
- 1994: O Planeta Blue na Estrada do Sol
- 1996: Amigo
- 1997: Nascimento
- 1998: Tambores de Minas
- 1999: Crooner
- 2000: Nos Bailes da Vida
- 2001: Gil & Milton (with Gilberto Gil)
- 2003: Pietá
- 2003: Music for Sunday Lovers
- 2005: O Coronel e o Lobisomem
- 2007: Milagre dos Peixes: Ao Vivo
- 2008: Novas Bossas
- 2008: Belmondo & Milton Nascimento
- 2010: ...E a Gente Sonhando
- 2010: Under Tokyo Skies (with Herbie Hancock)
- 2011: Nada Será Como Antes: O Musical
- 2013: Uma Travessia: 50 Anos de Carreira
- 2015: Tamarear (with Dudu Lima Trio)
- 2023: Outros Cantos (with Chitãozinho & Xororó)
- 2024: Milton + Esperanza (with Esperanza Spalding)

=== Extended plays ===
- 2018: A Festa
- 2018: Nada Será Como Antes
- 2020: Existe Amor (with Criolo)
- 2024: Moon Over Minas (with Jonathan Wilson)

=== Compilations ===
- 2000: Oratório
- 2004: Maria Maria / Ultimo Trem

=== Guest appearances ===
- 1972: Elis by Elis Regina
- 1978: Chico Buarque by Chico Buarque
- 1987: Brazilian Romance by Sarah Vaughan
- 1987: Dezembros by Maria Bethânia
- 1990: The Rhythm of the Saints by Paul Simon
- 1993: Duran Duran by Duran Duran
- 2004: Temple of Shadows by Angra

== Awards and recognition ==
- Latin Grammy Lifetime Achievement Award (2012)
- Honorary Doctorate of Music, awarded by Berklee College of Music (2016)

== Sources ==
- Motta, Nelson (2000). Noites Tropicais: Solos, Improvisos e Memórias Musicais (in Brazilian Portuguese). Rio de Janeiro, RJ: Objetiva. ISBN 978-85-7302-292-6.
- Dolores, Maria (2022) [2006]. Travessia: a Vida de Milton Nascimento (in Brazilian Portuguese). Rio de Janeiro, RJ: Editora Record. ISBN 978-65-5587-606-2.
- Mei, Giancarlo (2004). Canto Latino: Origine, Evoluzione e Protagonisti della Musica Popolare del Brasile. Preface by Sergio Bardotti; Afterword by Milton Nascimento. Viterbo, Italy: Stampa Alternativa-Nuovi Equilibri. ISBN 978-8872268018.
- McGowan, Chris; Pessanha, Ricardo (1998). The Brazilian Sound: Samba, Bossa Nova and the Popular Music of Brazil (2nd ed.). Philadelphia: Temple University Press. ISBN 978-1-56639-544-1.
- Perrone, Charles A. (1989). Masters of Contemporary Brazilian Song: MPB, 1965-1985. Austin: University of Texas Press. Chapter 4. ISBN 978-0-292-75102-6.
