= Txai =

Studio album by Milton Nascimento
- Released: 1990
- Genre: Latin
- Length: 35:50
- Label: Columbia
- Producers: Marcio Ferreira, Mazzola

Milton Nascimento chronology
Canção da America (1990)	Txai (1990)	Noticias do Brasil (1992)

Txai is an album by the Brazilian musician Milton Nascimento, released in 1990 in Brazil and in 1991 in the United States. It is dedicated to Aliança dos Povos da Floresta, a Brazilian environmental organization. The album title translates roughly to "comrade" in the Kashinawa language. Nascimento supported the album with a North American tour. Txai peaked at No. 1 on Billboard's World Albums chart. It was nominated for a Grammy Award for "Best World Music Album".

== Production ==
The album was inspired by an 18-day expedition Nascimento made in the Amazon rainforest, along the Juruá River. He included field recordings of indigenous Amazonian music, and ensured that royalties were sent to the appropriate tribes. "Nozani Na" was composed by Heitor Villa-Lobos. River Phoenix provided a spoken word piece on "Curi Curi".

== Critical reception ==
Professional ratings
Review scores
Source	Rating
AllMusic	3/5 stars
Calgary Herald	C
The Encyclopedia of Popular Music	3/5 stars
Entertainment Weekly	B
The Rolling Stone Album Guide	4/5 stars

The Washington Post wrote that "nearly all of [the songs] are lushly produced and equipped with hummable melodies that often belie the grave concern for the equatorial region that Nascimento expresses through his Portuguese lyrics." Entertainment Weekly determined that "musically and conceptually, Txai wanders more than it should." The Chicago Tribune deemed Txai "sort of a travelogue of the Amazon rainforest." The Edmonton Journal concluded that Nascimento's "voice—all alone, in reverberating harmonies, polyphony, or in traditional chants—makes for the overwhelming feel of the record." The Calgary Herald dismissed the album as "fake folk." The San Antonio Express-News stated that the album "melds Nascimento's refined melodies with the living sounds of the rain forest and the musical and poetic images of its indigenous peoples."

The Rolling Stone Album Guide called "Yanomami e Nós" "hauntingly emotional."

== Track listing ==
No.	Title	Length
1.	"Abertura"
2.	"Txai"
3.	"Baü Mētóro"
4.	"Coisas de Vida (That's Life)"
5.	"Hoeiepereiga"
6.	"Estórias da Floresta (Stories of the Forest)"
7.	"Yanomami e Nós – Pacto de Vida (Yanomami and Us – Pact of Life)"
8.	"Awasi"
9.	"A Tercera Margen do Rio (The Third Edge of the Water)"
10.	"Benke"
11.	"Sertão das Águas (Hinterlands of the Waters)"
12.	"Que Virá dessa Escuridão? (What Will Come Out of This Darkness?)"
13.	"Curi Curi"
14.	"Nozani Na"
15.	"Baridjumokô"
