= Buika =

Buika is a surname. Notable people with the surname include:

- Concha Buika (born 1972), Equatoguinean-Spanish singer
  - Buika (album), album by Concha Buika
- Virginia Buika (born 1986), Afro-Spanish musician, actress, director, and producer
